= List of celebrity boxing matches =

List of celebrity boxing matches, most of which were for charity or some type of Exhibition Fight.

== Matches ==
Match	Event	Winner
Muhammad Ali vs. Lyle Alzado	14 July 1979	—N/a
Muhammad Ali vs. Dave Semenko	12 June 1983	—N/a
Danny Bonaduce vs. Donny Osmond	17 January 1994	Bonaduce
Simon Woodstock vs. Mike Muir	Action Sports, 7 March 1996	Woodstock
Simon Woodstock vs. Sticky Fingaz	MTV Sports & Entertainment Festival, November 1998	Woodstock
Danny Bonaduce vs. Barry Williams	Celebrity Boxing, 13 March 2002	Bonaduce
Todd Bridges vs. Vanilla Ice	Celebrity Boxing, 13 March 2002	Bridges
Paula Jones vs. Tonya Harding	Celebrity Boxing, 13 March 2002	Harding
Darva Conger vs. Olga Korbut	Celebrity Boxing, 22 May 2002	Conger
Dustin Diamond vs. Ron Palillo	Celebrity Boxing, 22 May 2002	Diamond
Manute Bol vs. William Perry	Celebrity Boxing, 22 May 2002	Bol
Joey Buttafuoco vs. Joanie "Chyna" Laurer	Celebrity Boxing, 22 May 2002	Buttafuoco
Bob Mortimer vs. Les Dennis	Celebrity Boxing for Sport Relief, 13 July 2002	Mortimer
Ricky Gervais vs. Grant Bovey	The Fight, 29 December 2002	Gervais
Tonya Harding vs. Samantha Browning	Mike Tyson vs. Clifford Etienne, 22 February 2003	Browning
Ben Fogle vs. Sid Owen	Celebrity Boxing for Sport Relief, 10 July 2004	Fogle
Jack Osbourne vs. Bradley McIntosh	Celebrity Boxing for Sport Relief, 15 July 2006	Osbourne
Dolph Lundgren vs. Oleg Taktarov	King of the Ring, Russia, June 2007	Taktarov
Ben Shephard vs. Lemar	Celebrity Boxing for Sport Relief, 15 March 2008	Shephard
Vai Sikahema vs. Jose Canseco	War At The Shore, 12 July 2008	Sikahema
Danny Bonaduce vs. Jose Canseco	Bonaduce vs. Canseco: Supremacy, 25 January 2009	Draw
Wendell Sailor vs. Warwick Capper	The Contender Australia, 29 October 2009	Sailor
Rodney King vs. Simon Aouad	11 September 2009	King
Rob Kardashian vs. James Taylor	November 3, 2009	Taylor
Kim Kardashian vs. Tamara Frapasella	November 3, 2009	Frapasella
Jose Canseco vs. Todd Poulton	6 November 2009	Canseco
Shaquille O'Neal vs. Shane Mosley	Shaq vs., 2010	Mosley
Dave Mirra vs. Brian Deegan	Ellismania 7, 17 September 2011	Deegan
Jose Canseco vs. Tareq Salahi	Celebrity Fight Night, 5 November 2011	Canseco
Coolio vs. Jeremy Jackson	Celebrity Fight Night, 5 November 2011	Jackson
Justin Trudeau vs. Patrick Brazeau	31 March 2012	Trudeau
Ruby Rose vs. Yi Sia	Boxing for headspace, October 20, 2012	Rose
Jordan Carver vs. Melanie Müller	Pro7 Promi Boxen, Düsseldorf, 27 September 2014	Müller
Mitt Romney vs. Evander Holyfield	May 15, 2015	Holyfield
Floyd Mayweather Jr. vs. Conor McGregor	Floyd Mayweather Jr. vs. Conor McGregor, 26 August 2017	Mayweather Jr.
Uosof Ahmadi vs. Exploring with Josh	KSI vs. Joe Weller, 3 February 2018	Ahmadi
JMX vs. Mike Fox	KSI vs. Joe Weller, 3 February 2018	JMX
AnEsonGib vs. MaxPlays	KSI vs. Joe Weller, 3 February 2018	AnEsonGib
Liam Twinn vs. Jake Twinn	KSI vs. Joe Weller, 3 February 2018	Liam Twinn
KSI vs. Joe Weller	KSI vs. Joe Weller, 3 February 2018	KSI
Helen Skelton vs. Camilla Thurlow	Celebrity Boxing for Sport Relief, 23 March 2018	Skelton
Spencer Matthews vs. Wayne Bridge	Celebrity Boxing for Sport Relief, 23 March 2018	Bridge
Hannah Spearritt vs. Vanessa White	Celebrity Boxing for Sport Relief, 24 March 2018	White
Halal Ham vs. Jrizzy Jeremy	KSI vs. Logan Paul, 25 August 2018	Halal Ham
Michael Philippou vs. Scarce	KSI vs. Logan Paul, 25 August 2018	Philippou
FaZe Sensei vs. Overtflow	KSI vs. Logan Paul, 25 August 2018	FaZe Sensei
JMX vs. Coach Richard	KSI vs. Logan Paul, 25 August 2018	JMX
Momo vs. RossiHD	KSI vs. Logan Paul, 25 August 2018	Momo
AnEsonGib vs. Jay Swingler	KSI vs. Logan Paul, 25 August 2018	Gib
Deji vs. Jake Paul	KSI vs. Logan Paul, 25 August 2018	Paul
KSI vs. Logan Paul	KSI vs. Logan Paul, 25 August 2018	Draw
Supreme Patty vs. Rudy Prieto	Masvidal vs. Pettis, 15 June 2019	Prieto
Whindersson Nunes vs. Mario Silva	New Champion 2: Grandes Combates, 28 September 2019	Nunes
Fousey vs. Slim Albaher	Fight Night Yemen We Care Charity Boxing, 29 September 2019	Albaher
Adam Saleh vs. Marcus Stephenson	Fight Night Yemen We Care Charity Boxing, 29 September 2019	Saleh
Simon Woodstock vs. Jason Ellis	Ellismania 19, 9 November 2019	Ellis
Tyler Smith vs. Josh Brueckner	KSI vs. Logan Paul II, 9 November 2019	Brueckner
KSI vs. Logan Paul	KSI vs. Logan Paul II, 9 November 2019	KSI
My Mate Nate vs. Kyutae Oppa	Idol Fight, 22 February 2020	Nate
My Mate Nate vs. Thun Thanakorn	10Fight10 Season 2, 30 November 2020	Nate
Hafþór Júlíus Björnsson vs. Steven Ward	CoreSports Fight Night, 16 January 2021	—N/a
Jose Canseco vs. Billy Football of Barstool Sports	Rough N' Rowdy 13 Superbrawl III, 5 February 2021	Billy
Don "Bishop" Brumfield vs. Slap For Cash	Celebrity Championship Boxing 1, 3 April 2021	Bishop
Hornswoggle vs. Jeremy Smith	Rough N' Rowdy 14, 23 April 2021	Smith
Kenny KO vs Viktor Drago	Influencer Fight League 1, 1 May 2021	Drago
Future vs Torete	La Velada Del Año, 26 May 2021	Torete
Mr Jägger vs Viruzz	La Velada Del Año, 26 May 2021	Jägger
Reven vs ElMillo	La Velada Del Año, 26 May 2021	Reven
Hafþór Júlíus Björnsson vs. Simon Vallily	CoreSports Fight Night 2, 28 May 2021	Draw
Chad Johnson vs. Brian Maxwell	Floyd Mayweather Jr. vs. Logan Paul, 6 June 2021	—N/a
Logan Paul vs. Floyd Mayweather Jr.	Floyd Mayweather Jr. vs. Logan Paul, 6 June 2021	—N/a
Matt Thomas vs. Josh Adams	Celebrity Boxing 11, June 2021	Thomas
Tommy Moose vs. Jim Raffone	Celebrity Boxing 11, June 2021	Raffone
Steve Korpuze vs. Deejay Swartz	Celebrity Boxing 11, June 2021	Draw
Wide Neck vs. Drew Mournet	Celebrity Boxing 11, June 2021	Mournet
Tim Witherspoon vs. Hazel Roche	Celebrity Boxing 11, June 2021	Witherspoon
Cisco Rosado vs. Peter Gunz	Celebrity Boxing 11, June 2021	Rosado
Lamar Odom vs. Aaron Carter	Celebrity Boxing 11, June 2021	Odom
Ryan Johnston vs. Cale Saurage	Social Gloves: Battle Of The Platforms, 12 June 2021	Johnston
Landon McBroom vs. Ben Azelart	Social Gloves: Battle Of The Platforms, 12 June 2021	McBroom
FaZe Jarvis vs. Michael Le	Social Gloves: Battle Of The Platforms, 12 June 2021	FaZe Jarvis
DDG vs. Nate Wyatt	Social Gloves: Battle Of The Platforms, 12 June 2021	DDG
Deji Olatunji vs. Vinnie Hacker	Social Gloves: Battle Of The Platforms, 12 June 2021	Hacker
AnEsonGib vs. Tayler Holder	Social Gloves: Battle Of The Platforms, 12 June 2021	AnEsonGib
Austin McBroom vs. Bryce Hall	Social Gloves: Battle Of The Platforms, 12 June 2021	McBroom
Evil Hero vs. Dakota Olave	Bare Knuckle Fighting Championship 19: VanZant vs. Ostovich, 23 July 2021	Hero
Nick Ireland vs. DK Money	Bare Knuckle Fighting Championship 19: VanZant vs. Ostovich, 23 July 2021	Ireland
Blueface vs. Kane Trujillio	Bare Knuckle Fighting Championship 19: VanZant vs. Ostovich, 23 July 2021	Blueface
3bidaan vs Mohamed Khalid	Social Knockout, 30 July 2021	3bidaan
Slim Albaher vs. N&A Productions	Social Knockout, 30 July 2021	Albaher
Adam Saleh vs. Walid Sharks	Social Knockout, 30 July 2021	Draw
Money Kicks vs. Anas Elshayib	Social Knockout, 30 July 2021	Money Kicks
Supreme Patty vs. Dancing Dan	Rough N' Rowdy 15, 27 August 2021	Patty
Adam Jones vs. Bobby Laing	Rough N' Rowdy 15, 27 August 2021	Laing
Hafþór Júlíus Björnsson vs. Devon Larratt	CoreSports Fight Night 3, 18 September 2021	Björnsson
John Gabbana vs. Supreme Patty	Island Fights 69, 24 September 2021	Gabbana
Holy Gxd vs. Wide Neck	Official Celebrity Boxing: Ojani Noa vs. Lamar Odin, October 2 2021	Draw
Lamar Odom vs. Ojani Noa	Official Celebrity Boxing: Ojani Noa vs. Lamar Odin, October 2 2021	Odom
Nikita Samurai vs Mohammed Al-Falasi	Social Knockout 2, 30 October 2021	Nikita
Adnan vs. N&A Productions	Social Knockout 2, 30 October 2021	N&A Productions
Tyson vs. Niall aka Breadbatch	Social Knockout 2, 30 October 2021	Tyson
Jonny Young vs Louis James	Social Knockout 2, 30 October 2021	Draw
Slim Albaher vs 3bidaan	Social Knockout 2, 30 October 2021	Slim
Jumana Khan vs Sarleen Ahmed	Social Knockout 2, 30 October 2021	Khan
Anas Elshayib vs Adam Saleh	Social Knockout 2, 30 October 2021	Saleh
Money Kicks vs Ajmal Khan	Social Knockout 2, 30 October 2021	Kicks
John Gabbana vs. Albert Ochoa	Island Fights 70, 5 November 2021	Gabbana
Slap For Cash vs. Vito The Torpedo	Rough N Rowdy 16, 10 December 2021	Slap
Frank Gore vs. Deron Williams	Jake Paul vs. Tyron Woodley II, 18 December 2021	Williams
Whindersson Nunes vs. Acelino Freitas	Fight Music Show 1: Whindersson vs. Popó, 30 January 2022	Draw
Nikki Hru vs Miho Fuji	Influencer Fight League 2, 27 February 2022	Hru
Amber Mezner vs Solene Velvet	Influencer Fight League 2, 27 February 2022	Mezner
Ryan Taylor vs. DK Money	Deji vs. Alex Wassabi, 5 March 2022	DK Money
Salt Papi vs. Halal Ham	Deji vs. Alex Wassabi, 5 March 2022	Salt Papi
Stromedy vs. Austin Sprinz	Deji vs. Alex Wassabi, 5 March 2022	Stromedy
Armz Korleone vs. Minikon	Deji vs. Alex Wassabi, 5 March 2022	Korleone
Kristen Hanby vs. Vitaly	Deji vs. Alex Wassabi, 5 March 2022	Draw
King Kenny vs. FaZe Temperrr	Deji vs. Alex Wassabi, 5 March 2022	Temperrr
Deji vs. Alex Wassabi	Deji vs. Alex Wassabi, 5 March 2022	Wassabi
Remigijus Viršila vs. Maybach420	Jungle King 2, 2 April 2022	Viršila
Michael Reeves vs. Graham Stephan	Creator Clash, 14 May 2022	Reeves
I Did a Thing vs. TheOdd1sOut	Creator Clash, 14 May 2022	I Did a Thing
Matt Watson vs. Dad	Creator Clash, 14 May 2022	Dad
Ryan Magee vs. Alex Ernst	Creator Clash, 14 May 2022	Ernst
DJ Welch vs Internet Comment Etiquette	Creator Clash, 14 May 2022	Welch
Yodeling Haley vs. JustaMinx	Creator Clash, 14 May 2022	Minx
Hundar vs. Starkilla	Creator Clash, 14 May 2022	Hundar
Harley Morenstein vs. Egoraptor	Creator Clash, 14 May 2022	Morenstein
iDubbbz vs. Dr. Mike Varshavski	Creator Clash, 14 May 2022	Varshavski
Ashley Rak-Su vs. Big Tobz	Wicked N Bad 3, 21 May 2022	Ashley
Taze Whoosh vs Lippy Lickshot	Wicked N Bad 3, 21 May 2022	Lippy
John Gabbana vs. Chris Wright	Island Fights 72, 28 May 2022	Gabbana
Evil Hero vs. Frankie Lopiccolo	Official Celebrity Boxing, 11 June 2022	Evil Hero
Albert Ochoa vs Mike Mazza	Official Celebrity Boxing, 11 June 2022	Ochoa
Benzino vs. Mark Rizzoti	Official Celebrity Boxing, 11 June 2022	Benzino
Headkrack vs. Kimbo Slice Jr.	Official Celebrity Boxing, 11 June 2022	Draw
Cisco Rosado vs. Ojani Noa	Official Celebrity Boxing, 11 June 2022	Rosado
Blac Chyna vs. Alysia Magen	Official Celebrity Boxing, 11 June 2022	Draw
BDave vs God Carleon	Influencer Fight League 3, 18 June 2021	Draw
Viktor Drago vs ChinoTV	Influencer Fight League 3, 18 June 2021	Drago
Carola vs Spursito	La Velada Del Año 2, 25 June 2022	Spursito
AriGameplays vs Paracetamor	La Velada Del Año 2, 25 June 2022	AriGameplays
Momo vs Viruzz	La Velada Del Año 2, 25 June 2022	Viruzz
Luzu vs Lolito	La Velada Del Año 2, 25 June 2022	Lolito
Mr Jägger vs David Bustamante	La Velada Del Año 2, 25 June 2022	Jägger
Tempo Arts vs. Smithey	Ed Matthews vs. Simple Simon, 16 July 2022	Tempo
Paddy Murphy vs. Dave The Other Guy	Ed Matthews vs. Simple Simon, 16 July 2022	Dave
Pully Arif vs. Tommy Flex	Ed Matthews vs. Simple Simon, 16 July 2022	Arif
Luke Bennet vs. Dean LM	Ed Matthews vs. Simple Simon, 16 July 2022	LM
Ginty vs. Kayrhys	Ed Matthews vs. Simple Simon, 16 July 2022	Ginty
Chef Dave vs. Aaron Hunt	Ed Matthews vs. Simple Simon, 16 July 2022	Hunt
Elle Brooke vs. AJ Bunker	Ed Matthews vs. Simple Simon, 16 July 2022	Brooke
Ed Matthews vs. Simple Simon	Ed Matthews vs. Simple Simon, 16 July 2022	Matthews
Anthony Taylor vs. Ryan Taylor	Wicked N Bad 4, 31 July 2022	Draw
Iranian Hulk vs Kazakh Titan	Wicked N Bad 4, 31 July 2022	Titan
Money Kicks vs. Traycho Georgiev	Oleksandr Usyk vs. Anthony Joshua II, 20 August 2022	Georgiev
KSI vs. Swarmz	KSI vs. Swarmz & Luis Alcaraz Pineda, 27 August 2022	KSI
Deen the Great vs. Evil Hero	KSI vs. Swarmz & Luis Alcaraz Pineda, 27 August 2022	Deen
Sam Hyde vs. IAmThmpsn	KSI vs. Swarmz & Luis Alcaraz Pineda, 27 August 2022	Sam Hyde
Salt Papi vs. Andy Warski	KSI vs. Swarmz & Luis Alcaraz Pineda, 27 August 2022	Salt Papi
King Kenny vs. FaZe Sensei	KSI vs. Swarmz & Luis Alcaraz Pineda, 27 August 2022	Kenny
Deji vs. Fousey	KSI vs. Swarmz & Luis Alcaraz Pineda, 27 August 2022	Deji
FaZe Temperrr vs. Slim Albaher	KSI vs. Swarmz & Luis Alcaraz Pineda, 27 August 2022	Slim
KSI vs. Luis Alcaraz Pineda	KSI vs. Swarmz & Luis Alcaraz Pineda, 27 August 2022	KSI
Cory Wharton vs. Chase DeMoor	Austin McBroom vs. AnEsonGib, 10 September 2022	—N/a
Landon McBroom vs. Adam Saleh	Austin McBroom vs. AnEsonGib, 10 September 2022	Draw
Adrian Peterson vs. Le'Veon Bell	Austin McBroom vs. AnEsonGib, 10 September 2022	Bell
Swaggy P vs. Minikon	Austin McBroom vs. AnEsonGib, 10 September 2022	No Contest
Austin McBroom vs. AnEsonGib	Austin McBroom vs. AnEsonGib, 10 September 2022	AnEsonGib
Jizzy Mack vs. Kouzi	Floyd Mayweather Jr. vs. Mikuru Asakura, 25 September 2022	Kouzi
Floyd Mayweather Jr vs. Mikuru Asakura	Floyd Mayweather Jr. vs. Mikuru Asakura, 25 September 2022	Mayweather
Halal Ham vs. DTG	Jay Swingler vs. Cherdleys, 15 October 2022	Ham
Anthony Taylor vs. Ashley Rak-Su	Jay Swingler vs. Cherdleys, 15 October 2022	Taylor
Astrid Wett vs. Keelay	Jay Swingler vs. Cherdleys, 15 October 2022	Wett
JMX vs. Ginty	Jay Swingler vs. Cherdleys, 15 October 2022	JMX
Slim Albaher vs. Ryan Taylor	Jay Swingler vs. Cherdleys, 15 October 2022	Albaher
Jay Swingler vs. Cherdleys	Jay Swingler vs. Cherdleys, 15 October 2022	Swingler
Albert Ochoa vs. Carson Key	Celebrity Boxing Showboat 2022, 15 October 2022	Ochoa
IzzyyDrake vs. M2ThaK	Celebrity Boxing Showboat 2022, 15 October 2022	M2ThaK
Slim1Workout vs. StreetGorilla	Guido Vianello vs. Jay McFarlane, 28 October 2022	StreetGorilla
Chris Avila vs. Doctor Mike	Jake Paul vs. Anderson Silva, 29 October 2022	Avila
Uriah Hall vs. Le'Veon Bell	Jake Paul vs. Anderson Silva, 29 October 2022	Hall
My Mate Mate vs. Tack Pharunyoo	Idol Fight 3, 5 November 2022	Nate
Jack Fincham vs. Anthony Taylor	Floyd Mayweather Jr. vs. Deji, 13 November 2022	Draw
Bobby Fish vs. Boateng Prempeh	Floyd Mayweather Jr. vs. Deji, 13 November 2022	Fish
Floyd Mayweather Jr. vs. Deji	Floyd Mayweather Jr. vs. Deji, 13 November 2022	Mayweather Jr.
Minikon vs. Nick Joseph	Deen the Great vs. Walid Sharks, 19 November 2022	Minikon
Ice Poseidon vs. Brandon Buckingham	Deen the Great vs. Walid Sharks, 19 November 2022	Buckingham
FaZe Temperrr vs. Overtflow	Deen the Great vs. Walid Sharks, 19 November 2022	FaZe Temperrr
King Kenny vs. DK Money	Deen the Great vs. Walid Sharks, 19 November 2022	King Kenny
Hasim Rahman Jr. vs. Greg Hardy	Deen the Great vs. Walid Sharks, 19 November 2022	Hardy
Josh Brueckner vs. Chase DeMoor	Deen the Great vs. Walid Sharks, 19 November 2022	Brueckner
Deen the Great vs. Walid Sharks	Deen the Great vs. Walid Sharks, 19 November 2022	Deen the Great
Tasha Kiran vs. AJ Bunker	Rage Combat Boxing, 26 November 2022	Bunker
Ty Mitchell vs. Liam Forrest	Rage Combat Boxing, 26 November 2022	Mitchell
Pully Arif vs. Kane Ramsay	Rage Combat Boxing, 26 November 2022	Arif
Callum Izzard vs. James Tindale	Rage Combat Boxing, 26 November 2022	Izzard
Likkleman vs. Choon Tan	Rage Combat Boxing, 26 November 2022	Likkleman
Vance Randolph vs Your Average Kebob Guy	Rough N Rowdy 19, 9 December 2022	Randolph
KC Fantastic LA vs Sleezy	Influencer Fight League 4, 10 December 2022	KC
RCG53 vs DanSteezy	Influencer Fight League 4, 10 December 2022	RCG53
Slap For Cash vs Ruben Zapata	Influencer Fight League 4, 10 December 2022	Slap
BDave vs Zack Bernardez	Influencer Fight League 4, 10 December 2022	BDave
Manny Pacquiao vs. DK Yoo	Manny Pacquiao vs. DK Yoo, 11 December 2022	Pacquiao
Elle Brooke vs. Faith Ordway	KSI vs. FaZe Temperrr, 14 January 2023	Brooke
Ryan Taylor vs. Swarmz	KSI vs. FaZe Temperrr, 14 January 2023	Swarmz
Salt Papi vs. Josh Brueckner	KSI vs. FaZe Temperrr, 14 January 2023	Papi
Slim Albaher vs. Tom Zanetti	KSI vs. FaZe Temperrr, 14 January 2023	Slim
KSI vs. FaZe Temperrr	KSI vs. FaZe Temperrr, 14 January 2023	KSI
Floyd Mayweather Jr. vs. Aaron Chalmers	Floyd Mayweather Jr. vs. Aaron Chalmers, 25 February 2023	—N/a
Tempo Arts vs. Godson Umeh	Jay Swingler vs. Nicholai Perrett, 4 March 2023	Tempo
Ginty vs. Halal Ham	Jay Swingler vs. Nicholai Perrett, 4 March 2023	Ginty
Astrid Wett vs. AJ Bunker	Jay Swingler vs. Nicholai Perrett, 4 March 2023	Wett
Los Pineda Coladas vs. D-Generation Ice (BDave and Luis Alcaraz Pineda vs. Ice Poseidon & Anthony Vargas)	Jay Swingler vs. Nicholai Perrett, 4 March 2023	Los Pineda Coladas
King Kenny vs. Ashley Rak-Su	Jay Swingler vs. Nicholai Perrett, 4 March 2023	Rak-Su
Deen The Great vs. Pully Arif	Jay Swingler vs. Nicholai Perrett, 4 March 2023	Deen
Jay Swingler vs. Nicholai Perrett	Jay Swingler vs. Nicholai Perrett, 4 March 2023	Swingler
Simple Simon vs. Chef Dave	Sunday Smoke, 19 March 2023	Simon
Jack Manifold vs. Dakota Olave	Creator Clash 2, 15 April 2023	Manifold
Jaelaray vs. Abelina Sabrina	Creator Clash 2, 15 April 2023	Jaelaray
Dad vs. Starkilla	Creator Clash 2, 15 April 2023	Dad
William Haynes vs. Chris Ray Gun	Creator Clash 2, 15 April 2023	Haynes
RIPMika vs. Alanah Pearce	Creator Clash 2, 15 April 2023	Pearce
Myth vs. Hundar	Creator Clash 2, 15 April 2023	Myth
Haley Sharpe vs. Marisha Ray	Creator Clash 2, 15 April 2023	Sharpe
Arin Hanson vs. Jarvis Johnson	Creator Clash 2, 15 April 2023	Hanson
Andrea Botez vs. Michelle Khare	Creator Clash 2, 15 April 2023	Khare
Leonhart vs. CrankGamePlays	Creator Clash 2, 15 April 2023	CrankGamePlays
John Morrison vs. Harley Morenstein	Creator Clash 2, 15 April 2023	Morrison
Floyd Mayweather Jr. vs. John Gotti III	Floyd Mayweather Jr. vs. John Gotti III, 11 June 2023	No Contest
NDO Champ vs. Roy Jones Jr.	Official Celebrity Boxing: Clash in the Metaverse, 30 June 2023	Jones Jr.
Tommy Fury vs. Eddie Hall	Tommy Fury vs. Eddie Hall, 13 June 2026	Fury

== Professional matches ==
Here is a list of fights undertaken by celebrities and sanctioned as professional boxing matches.

Match	Event	Venue	Winner
Tonya Harding vs. Samantha Browning	Mike Tyson vs. Clifford Etienne, 22 February 2003	The Pyramid, Memphis, Tennessee, U.S.	Browning
Floyd Mayweather Jr. vs. Conor McGregor	Floyd Mayweather Jr. vs. Conor McGregor, August 26, 2017	T-Mobile Arena, Paradise, Nevada, U.S.	Mayweather
KSI vs. Logan Paul II	KSI vs. Logan Paul II, 9 November 2019	Staples Center, Los Angeles, California, U.S.	KSI
Jake Paul vs. AnEsonGib	Demetrius Andrade vs. Luke Keeler, 30 January 2020	Meridian at Island Gardens, Miami, Florida, U.S.	Paul
Jake Paul vs. Nate Robinson	Mike Tyson vs. Roy Jones Jr., 28 November 2020	Staples Center, Los Angeles, California, U.S.	Paul
Joe Fournier vs. Reykon	Jake Paul vs. Ben Askren, 17 April 2021	Mercedes-Benz Stadium, Atlanta, Georgia, U.S.	Fournier
Jake Paul vs. Ben Askren	Jake Paul vs. Ben Askren, 17 April 2021	Mercedes-Benz Stadium, Atlanta, Georgia, U.S.	Paul
Jake Paul vs. Tyron Woodley	Jake Paul vs. Tyron Woodley, 29 August 2021	Rocket Mortgage FieldHouse, Cleveland, Ohio, U.S.	Paul
Jake Paul vs. Tyron Woodley	Jake Paul vs. Tyron Woodley II, 18 December 2021	Amalie Arena, Tampa, Florida, U.S.	Paul
Hafþór Júlíus Björnsson vs. Eddie Hall	Eddie Hall vs. Hafþór Björnsson, 19 March 2022	Dubai Duty Free Tennis Stadium, U.A.E.	Björnsson — UD
KSI vs. Swarmz	KSI vs. Swarmz, August 27, 2022	The O2 Arena, London, England	KSI
Austin McBroom vs. AnEsonGib	Austin McBroom vs. AnEsonGib, 10 September 2022	Banc of California Stadium, Los Angeles, California, U.S.	AnEsonGib
Jake Paul vs. Anderson Silva	Jake Paul vs. Anderson Silva, 29 October 2022	Gila River Arena, Phoenix, Arizona, U.S.	Paul
KSI vs. FaZe Temperrr	KSI vs. FaZe Temperrr, January 14, 2023	Wembley Arena, London, England	KSI
Evil Hero vs. Adam Saleh	Jake Paul vs. Tommy Fury, 26 February 2023	Diriyah Arena, Riyadh, Saudi Arabia	Saleh
Jake Paul vs. Tommy Fury	Jake Paul vs. Tommy Fury, 26 February 2023	Diriyah Arena, Riyadh, Saudi Arabia	Fury
iDubbbz vs. Alex Wassabi	Creator Clash 2, 15 April 2023	Amalie Arena, Tampa, Florida, United States	Wassabi
Fangs vs. Alaena Vampira	JMX vs. Le'Veon Bell, 21 April 2023	XULA Convocation Center, New Orleans, Louisiana, U.S.	Vampira
Chase DeMoor vs. Stevie Knight	JMX vs. Le'Veon Bell, 21 April 2023	XULA Convocation Center, New Orleans, Louisiana, U.S.	Knight
OJ ROSÉ vs. Kimbo Slice Jr	JMX vs. Le'Veon Bell, 21 April 2023	XULA Convocation Center, New Orleans, Louisiana, U.S.	ROSÉ
Minikon vs. Jake The Viking	JMX vs. Le'Veon Bell, 21 April 2023	XULA Convocation Center, New Orleans, Louisiana, U.S.	Draw
Uncle Pizza vs. YuddyGangTV	JMX vs. Le'Veon Bell, 21 April 2023	XULA Convocation Center, New Orleans, Louisiana, U.S.	Pizza
Walid Sharks vs. Ayye Pap	JMX vs. Le'Veon Bell, 21 April 2023	XULA Convocation Center, New Orleans, Louisiana, U.S.	Sharks
Chris Avila vs. Paul Bamba	JMX vs. Le'Veon Bell, 21 April 2023	XULA Convocation Center, New Orleans, Louisiana, U.S.	Avila
JMX vs. Le'Veon Bell	JMX vs. Le'Veon Bell, 21 April 2023	XULA Convocation Center, New Orleans, Louisiana, U.S.	Bell
KSI vs. Joe Fournier	KSI vs. Joe Fournier, 13 May 2023	Wembley Arena, London, England	No Contest
Jake Paul vs. Nate Diaz	Jake Paul vs. Nate Diaz, 5 August 2023	American Airlines Center, Dallas, Texas, U.S.	Paul
Logan Paul vs. Dillon Danis	KSI vs Tommy Fury, 14 October 2023	Manchester Arena, Manchester, England	Paul
KSI vs. Tommy Fury	KSI vs Tommy Fury, 14 October 2023	Manchester Arena, Manchester, England	Fury
Tyson Fury vs. Francis Ngannou	Tyson Fury vs. Francis Ngannou, 28 October 2023	Kingdom Arena, Riyadh, Saudi Arabia	Fury
Anthony Joshua vs. Francis Ngannou	Anthony Joshua vs. Francis Ngannou, 8 March 2024	Kingdom Arena, Riyadh, Saudi Arabia	Joshua
Nate Diaz vs. Jorge Masvidal	Nate Diaz vs. Jorge Masvidal, 6 July 2024	Honda Center, Anaheim, California, U.S.	Diaz
Jake Paul vs. Mike Perry	Jake Paul vs. Mike Perry, 20 July 2024	Amalie Arena, Tampa, Florida, U.S.	Paul
Jake Paul vs. Mike Tyson	Jake Paul vs. Mike Tyson, 15 November 2024	AT&T Stadium, Arlington, Texas, U.S.	Paul
Jake Paul vs. Julio Cesar Chavez Jr.	Jake Paul vs. Julio Cesar Chavez Jr., 28 June 2025	Honda Center, Anaheim, California, U.S.	Paul
Jake Paul vs. Anthony Joshua	Jake Paul vs. Anthony Joshua, 19 December 2025	Kaseya Center, Miami, Florida. U.S.	Joshua
Henry Cejudo vs. Javon Walton	Henry Cejudo vs. Javon Walton, 26 September 2026	James L. Knight Center, Miami, Florida, U.S.	Cejudo

== See also ==
- Celebrity Boxing, 2002 reality TV show
- Freak show fight
- KSI vs Jake Paul
- List of influencer boxing matches
- Muhammad Ali vs. Antonio Inoki
- Professional wrestling
- Sports entertainment
- White-collar boxing
