= Rallison =

Rallison is a surname. Notable people with the surname include:

- Janette Rallison (born 1966), American writer
- Robert James Rallison known as TheOdd1sOut (born 1996), American YouTuber and animator
