= HowToBasic =

Australian YouTube comedy channel

Instagram information
- Page: HowToBasic
- Followers: Over 391k as of 2026

TikTok information
- Page: howtobasic
- Followers: 5.2 million

X information
- Handle: @howtobasic
- Years active: 2012–present
- Followers: 306.6k

YouTube information
- Channel: HowToBasic
- Years active: 2011–present
- Genres: Surreal humour; Black comedy; Visual gags; Vlog
- Subscribers: 17.8 million
- Views: 4 billion
- Last updated: 11 July 2026

HowToBasic is an Australian YouTube comedy channel, with over 17 million subscribers as of 2025. The creator of the videos neither speaks nor shows his face, thus remaining anonymous. The channel primarily features bizarre and destructive visual gags disguised as how-to tutorials. The channel started in 2011.

As of October 2025, HowToBasic is the eighth biggest Australian YouTube channel. The channel's estimated net worth is US$2 million as of November 2018.

The channel was briefly suspended on two occasions: once in 2014 and again in late 2015 on presumed violations of YouTube's policy on misleading content. Both times, the channel was restored and the suspension was lifted.

== Description and history ==
The channel intentionally clickbaits first-time viewers to believe it is a how-to channel, with video titles, thumbnails, descriptions, as well as the channel's general description, claiming its videos to be tutorials on different subjects, with a particular emphasis on cooking. The actual content of the videos shows an unidentified man interacting in point of view destroying, throwing, and lasciviously interacting with food, often making a huge mess. Some videos have employed additional gags, with guest actors and related footage appearing. Originally, the videos were genuine tutorials of very simple actions, such as "How to pick up a [sic] umbrella" (the channel's first video) or "How to pour drinks".

HowToBasic on a 2019 episode of the Cold Ones podcast

A common theme in the videos is that a large assortment of foods, often eggs, are thrown and destroyed, or the meal HowToBasic is trying to cook is smashed with a hammer or a shovel. Many of the videos include a running gag in which the man gives a thumbs-up or sometimes the finger gun or the middle finger in front of the camera while pointing the camera at the mess created, often grunting affirmatively. This is typically just before the scene ends. Occasionally, HowToBasic participates in certain holidays and trending topics; some of the videos also feature guest appearances.

On 24 March 2018, HowToBasic released what appeared to be a face reveal video. However, the video turns out to be a parody and a compilation of YouTubers claiming themselves to be the creator of the channel. Over 80 individuals had a cameo in the video, including Michael Stevens of Vsauce, Markiplier, Casey Neistat, Daym Drops, h3h3productions, jacksfilms, Andy Milonakis, iDubbbz, Boogie2988, JonTron, Maxmoefoe, Jacksepticeye, RoomieOfficial, Aunty Donna, and Post Malone.

== In popular culture ==
In June 2013, the man behind HowToBasic was interviewed as part of a 6:00 PM Australian News Bulletin by Nine News Perth, broadcast on STW. The station preserved his anonymity at his request.

== See also ==
- List of YouTubers
- AlanTutorial
