= Asian Jake Paul =

2017 single by iDubbbz featuring Boyinaband

Single by iDubbbz featuring Boyinaband
- Released: October 3, 2017
- Recorded: September 2017
- Studio: Boyinaband Studios
- Genre: Comedy hip hop; diss track
- Length: 3:00
- Label: iDubbbzTV
- Songwriters: Ian Jomha; David Brown
- Producer: Kustom Beats

Boyinaband singles chronology
"I'm Not Dead" (2016)	"Asian Jake Paul" (2017)	"Empty" (2018)

Music video
- "Asian Jake Paul" from YouTube (archived)

"Asian Jake Paul" is a song by American internet personality iDubbbz featuring English YouTube personality and recording artist Boyinaband. The song was written by the two and was produced by Kustom Beats. It is a diss track aimed at fellow YouTube personality RiceGum, the subject of an episode of iDubbbz's Content Cop series. The single was released for digital download on October 3, 2017. It peaked at number 24 on the Billboard R&B/Hip-Hop Digital Song Sales chart.

== Background and lyrics ==
On October 3, 2017, iDubbbz released an episode of his Content Cop series, "Content Cop – Jake Paul." While the title and thumbnail reference YouTuber, boxer and former Disney actor Jake Paul, the video discusses RiceGum, therein described as "Asian Jake Paul." During the video, iDubbbz explains that he didn't want to "give [RiceGum] the satisfaction of having his name in the title or his face in the thumbnail." Throughout the video, iDubbbz criticizes RiceGum for controversial comments and actions in his livestreams and YouTube videos. iDubbbz wears a t-shirt parodying the clothing brand Supreme and the streetwear culture RiceGum is associated with.

The video ends with a music video for the song "Asian Jake Paul," performed by iDubbbz and Boyinaband, parodying RiceGum's diss tracks about other YouTubers. The song's lyrics mock RiceGum, referencing the controversies discussed in the video. The same day, iDubbbz uploaded the music video on its own to his second channel, iDubbbzTV2. Boyinaband also released a video on his own channel, showing the songwriting and production process.

== Music video ==
The music video for "Asian Jake Paul" was primarily filmed in Brighton, England and was released on October 3, 2017. The video features cameos from other YouTubers, including PewDiePie, Ethan Klein of h3h3Productions, Jack Douglass, Erik Hoffstad of Internet Comment Etiquette, and HowToBasic. In the video, some of the guest YouTubers wear white hoodies with the same mock Supreme logo that iDubbbz wore in the original Content Cop video.

By January 2023, the video had surpassed 86 million views on YouTube. However, shortly after, the video was removed from YouTube by a copyright claim attributed to Matt Mandell, with no further information provided. However, the video was archived on the Wayback Machine and has been re-uploaded onto YouTube by other users.

== Track listing ==
Digital download
No.	Title	Length
1.	"Asian Jake Paul" (featuring Boyinaband)	3:00
2.	"Asian Jake Paul" (instrumental)	3:00
3.	"Asian Jake Paul" (acappella) (featuring Boyinaband)	3:00

== Charts ==
Chart performance for "Asian Jake Paul"
Chart (2017)	Peak position
Scottish Singles Sales (Official Charts)	74
UK Singles Downloads (Official Charts)	75
UK Independent (Official Charts)	22
US R&B/Hip-Hop Digital Song Sales (Billboard)	24

== Release history ==
Release history for "Asian Jake Paul"
Region	Date	Format	Label(s)	Ref.
Various	October 3, 2017 (Note: Released as a single.)	Digital download	iDubbbzTV	

== See also ==
- List of diss tracks § YouTube
