= IDubbbz =

American YouTuber (born 1990)

iDubbbz
- iDubbbz in 2023
- Born: Ian Kane Washburn; October 1, 1990 (age 36); San Bernardino County, California, U.S.
- Education: California State University, San Marcos (BS)
- Occupation: YouTuber
- Spouse: Anisa Jomha (m. 2021)

Twitch information
- Channel: idubbbz
- Years active: 2013, 2020–present
- Followers: 165,000

YouTube information
- Channel: iDubbbzTV
- Years active: 2013–present
- Genres: Comedy; criticism; unboxing; gaming
- Subscribers: 6.89 million (iDubbbzTV); 2.68 million (iDubbbzTV2); 744 thousand (iDubbbzgames); 112 thousand (idubbbzStream)
- Views: 1.25 billion (iDubbbzTV); 167 million (iDubbbzTV2); 7.22 million (iDubbbzgames); 6.23 million (idubbbzStream)
- Martial arts career
- Height: 6 ft 1 in (1.85 m)
- Weight: 168 lb (76 kg; 12.0 st)
- Stance: Orthodox
- Fighting out of: Seattle, Washington, U.S.
- Last updated: March 2, 2026

Ian Kane Jomha (né Washburn; (Note: While several sources provided Carter as iDubbbz's last name, he has refuted it as an "internet lie".) born October 1, 1990), known online as iDubbbz, is an American YouTube personality, boxing promoter and boxer. The creator of the YouTube channels iDubbbzTV, iDubbbzTV2, and iDubbbzgames, he is best known for his comedy video series, including Content Cop, Bad Unboxing and Kickstarter Crap, his collaborations with numerous other creators and recent foray into boxing and documentary filmmaking. His 2017 diss track "Asian Jake Paul" charted and peaked at number 24 on Billboard's US R&B/HH Digital Song Sales chart.

== Life and career ==
Ian Kane Washburn was born on October 1, 1990. He attended California State University, San Marcos and graduated with a bachelor's degree in Business Management. Although his parents encouraged him to get a job, by the time he had graduated, his YouTube channel had grown to the point where it became economically viable to pursue it as a full-time career. iDubbbz has been credited for making several videos and cameos that became Internet memes.

=== Content Cop ===
iDubbbz's Content Cop series highlights other YouTube channels, critiquing their content as well as their owner's behavior on social media. From December 2015 to October 2017, iDubbbz released Content Cop episodes on a wide variety of YouTube personalities, including LeafyIsHere, Tana Mongeau, and RiceGum.

In May 2016, iDubbbz released a Content Cop video on Daniel Keem, better known as Keemstar, and his channel DramaAlert. According to The Daily Beast, iDubbbz accused Keemstar of using DramaAlert to "promote his friends and punish his enemies". In response, Keem called the Content Cop video "entertaining" and denied wanting to attack other YouTubers, saying he has "no problem booking guests or landing exclusive interviews".

In October 2017, iDubbbz uploaded a video titled "Content Cop – Jake Paul", which had over 50 million views as of May 2021 before it got removed. However, the 31-minute video was not about the YouTube personality Jake Paul, but instead it was about RiceGum. in the video, iDubbbz analyzes and critiques RiceGum in a format inspired by the seven deadly sins. Released along with the Content Cop episode, iDubbbz released a music video for a diss track of RiceGum titled "Asian Jake Paul", which featured Boyinaband. The song has over 85 million views as of August 2021. The song peaked at number 24 on the R&B/Hip-hop Digital Song Sales chart.

RiceGum responded with several videos, including "Frick Da Police", a response diss track, and a 22-minute video response. iDubbbz responded with a follow-up video titled "Content Deputy – AJP" rebutting RiceGum's responses, featuring a comedic cameo by rapper Post Malone, and stating that this would be his final response to the situation.

In late 2019, three years after iDubbbz's Content Cop episode on LeafyIsHere, YouTube removed the video as a consequence of the website's updated policies on harassment and bullying.

In May 2023, iDubbbz unlisted the Content Cop videos after releasing a video titled "I miss the old iDubbbz" on his main channel. In the video, he apologizes to each creator he criticized in the series (with an emphasis on the Content Cop video he made on Tana Mongeau) for harassing them and inciting harassment from his fans. He also apologized for creating "hurtful and damaging content" and "cultivating a culture of apathy and cruelty" through the Content Cop video about Mongeau, and his use of racial slurs.

iDubbbz revived the Content Cop series in April 2025, releasing an episode on Ethan Klein of h3h3Productions.

=== Creator Clash ===
In January 2022, iDubbbz announced Creator Clash, a celebrity boxing charity event that took place on May 14, 2022. Notable participants included Doctor Mike, Harley Morenstein from Epic Meal Time, Arin "Egoraptor" Hanson from Game Grumps, along with Matt Watson, Nathan Barnatt, TheOdd1sOut, I did a thing, and Michael Reeves. It was later announced that streamers Esfand and MoistCr1tikal would join as interviewer and color commentator respectively.

On May 14, the event was held at the Yuengling Center in Tampa, Florida, and was also livestreamed. Creator Clash was held in 2022 and 2023 for charity, with the latter failing to raise any money. After Creator Clash 2 ultimately lost $250,000, iDubbbz started a 24-hour live stream on Twitch with a goal of raising the money lost for the charities involved. The stream ended up raising $162,121.69. In 2025, he announced his departure from Creator Clash.

== Personal life ==
Anisa Jomha (left) and IDubbbz in 2023

In March 2020, many of iDubbbz's fans took to social media after his girlfriend, Anisa Jomha, announced her OnlyFans on Twitter. Responding to the remarks of fans accusing him of being a "simp", he stated, "I love my girlfriend, and I'm totally fine with it. It doesn't affect me. If you are upset by me admitting this, then I suggest you go idolize someone else." In April 2021, iDubbbz and Jomha announced their engagement. They married on June 28, 2021, and he took her surname. As of 2026, iDubbbz has resided in Canada.

=== Legal dispute with Ethan Klein ===
In May 2026, Ethan Klein's legal team filed a cease and desist against iDubbbz, accusing him of defamation, including calling him a "molester" of his own children. On June 9, 2026, iDubbbz announced that a defamation lawsuit was filed against him in Albertan courts. iDubbbz criticized Klein's motivation for suing him, claiming that it threatens free speech for content creators, especially in Canada. The next day, Klein discussed the lawsuit on his podcast, displaying footage of iDubbbz's stream with a message accusing him of molesting his children, claiming that the context made the message a defamatory accusation rather than free speech. On June 15, 2026, iDubbbz uploaded a video apology towards Klein regarding the message, Klein accepted the apology and dropped the lawsuit against him.

== Discography ==
=== Singles ===
List of singles, with selected chart positions, showing year released and album name
Title	Year	Peak chart positions			Album
Title	Year	US R&B/HH Digital	SCO	UK Indie	Album
"Asian Jake Paul" (featuring Boyinaband)	2017	24	74	22	Non-album single

== Boxing record ==
=== Professional ===
1 fight	0 wins	1 loss
By decision	0	1

No.	Result	Record	Opponent	Type	Round, time	Date	Location	Notes
1	Loss	0–1	Alex Wassabi	MD	4	Apr 15, 2023	Amalie Arena, Tampa, Florida, U.S.	

=== Exhibition ===
1 fight	0 wins	1 loss
By decision	0	1

No.	Result	Record	Opponent	Type	Round, time	Date	Location	Notes
1	Loss	0–1	Doctor Mike	UD	5	May 14, 2022	Yuengling Center, Tampa, Florida, U.S.	

== See also ==
- List of YouTubers
