= LeafyIsHere =

American social media personality (born 1995)

- Born: Calvin Lee Vail; 1995 or 1996 (age 30–31); Layton, Utah, U.S.
- Years active: 2011–2017, 2020

YouTube information
- Genre: Commentary
- Subscribers: 4.91 million (terminated)
- Views: 1.2 billion (terminated)

Calvin Lee Vail (born 1995), known online as LeafyIsHere or simply Leafy, is an American former Internet celebrity best known for his YouTube channel which focused on reaction content. Vail first gained popularity on the site for his commentary on Internet videos and culture. Prior, he posted Let's Play content.

Beginning in 2016, Vail was involved in several conflicts with other YouTubers which led to allegations of cyberbullying and various violations of website terms of service. YouTube terminated Vail's account in 2020, citing repeated violations of their harassment policies.

== Early and personal life ==
Vail was born in 1995 in Layton, Utah. His mother is of Chinese descent and his father is of Swedish descent.

== Career ==
The LeafyIsHere channel was a drama, commentary, and story time channel. On the channel, Vail mainly commented on gossip involving online content creators and made videos telling life stories. He had made rants on popular YouTubers such as Onision.

Vail started his channel in 2011, at the age of 16, and began uploading content in 2013. He focused mostly on reactions and gaming videos.

In 2015 and 2016, Vail was the target of a swatting campaign, with repeated police calls from December 2015 to February 2016. At the time he was living in Layton, United States.

In 2016, YouTuber iDubbbz featured Leafy in an episode of his Content Cop series, accusing him of cyberbullying in his videos, among other criticisms. Also in 2016, Vail accused YouTuber Evalion of supporting Nazism and antisemitism. Shortly after Vail drew attention to her, Evalion was banned by YouTube. Later that year, one of Vail's videos in which he called non-binary vlogger Milo Stewart an "it" and a "creature" was taken down by YouTube. Vail made three videos attacking Stewart.

Starting in December 2017, Vail's YouTube channel went on a hiatus for more than two years. After a more than two-year-long hiatus, Vail returned to YouTube with a video insulting iDubbbz in March 2020, following which he resumed posting frequently. In July, Vail began criticizing Twitch streamer Pokimane and her supporters based on speculation about her personal life.

On August 21, 2020, Vail's YouTube account was permanently terminated. According to The Verge, Vail's channel had three violations in the previous three months, such as cyberbullying and encouraging viewers to disrupt other people's streams. A YouTube spokesperson said the channel had repeatedly violated YouTube's policies on harassment. Following the ban, Vail began streaming frequently on Twitch. He has also posted on competing video platforms StoryFire and Rumble. He also got into conflicts with Ethan Klein.

On September 11, 2020, Vail's Twitch account was also banned, and has not been restored. Earlier that day, Vail had tweeted about receiving a strike on his account from Twitch for "hateful conduct and threats of violence against a person or group of people".

Vail's original Twitter/X account (@LeafyIsHere), dormant since May 2017, was reinstated on December 14, 2021. It was suspended again in 2022.
