= I Did a Thing =

Australian YouTube personality and comedian

Alex Apollonov
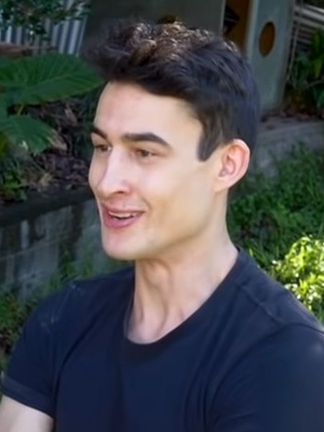
- Apollonov in 2020
- Born: 28 April 1992 (age 34)

YouTube information
- Channels: I did a thing; Boy Boy; Daily Dose of Boy Boy
- Years active: 2016–present
- Genre: Comedy
- Subscribers: 5.59 million (main channel); 1.27 million (Boy Boy)
- Views: 835 million (main channel); 102 million (Boy Boy)
- Last updated: 10 June 2026

Alex Apollonov is an Australian YouTube personality and comedian, better known for his online presence as I Did a Thing, and his YouTube channel of the same name. He is also the co-star of Boy Boy which he created with fellow comedian Aleksa Vulović who also stars in his videos. Much of Apollonov's content involves using his engineering and fabrication skills to design and build a variety of projects, including recreating the Utah monolith in Australia, simulating the Aurora Borealis in his kitchen with a high voltage transformer to parody The Simpsons, and making a scaled-up chainsaw powered Beyblade with a giant circular blade that is spun by a chainsaw motor. Other projects have included building a laser guided drone that drops steel darts, creating a hammer that uses blank rounds to drive nails, and mounting a submachine gun to a robot dog.

Many of Apollonov's projects have gained widespread media attention in Australia, including his trip to North Korea to get a haircut, his successful attempt to enter Star casino in Sydney with overt COVID-19 symptoms, and for recreating the Utah monolith in Australia. His content is often uploaded by the comedy group The Chaser, and has collaborated with other internet celebrities and YouTubers including Boyinaband, Maxmoefoe, William Osman, iDubbbz, Hasan Piker, and the comedy group Aunty Donna. Many of Apollonov's videos also star fellow comedian Aleksa Vulović, as the two are close friends and often work on their individual projects with help from each other. Apollonov also has an X following of 231,900 followers.

In May 2022, Apollonov participated in the Creator Clash event set up by fellow YouTuber Ian Jomha (iDubbbz) alongside many other YouTube personalities. He fought against James Rallison (TheOdd1sOut) and won.

== Early life ==
In the January 2021 episode of the Cold Ones podcast, Apollonov stated his family arrived in Australia from Siberia. He later clarified that both his parents were Chinese-born Russians, and he was born in Australia.

Before starting his career as a comedian and YouTube personality, Apollonov began five separate university degrees and failed to complete any of them. He also held over thirteen jobs, eleven of which he was fired from for reasons such as eating cheese from a restaurant's fridge, giving his friends free drinks, and failing to turn up to work. In a 2022 stream with Hasan Piker, he called himself a socialist.

== YouTube career ==
=== Boy Boy (2016–present) ===
In 2016, Apollonov and fellow comedian Vulović founded the YouTube channel Boy Boy. Much of the content centered around myth-busting sensationalist claims in Australian media, while also using comedy to bring light to issues of such as climate change, colonialism, police violence, and racism. Boy Boy's patreon says as of 2024 that they are "making communist propaganda for idiots". One video produced by this channel included Apollonov calling an Australian anti-terrorist hotline and reporting Vulović for wanting to join a violent militaristic organisation with ties to violence in the Middle East, which at the end of the video was revealed to be the Australian military. Due to the low traffic of the Boy Boy channel, Apollonov created a new channel in 2018 titled "I did a thing", although he still uploads videos to Boy Boy on a less frequent basis. Much of the content on this channel was inspired by Louis Theroux and The Chaser's War on Everything.

==== The Haircut (2017) ====
The short documentary-style movie titled The Haircut (2017) was the most successful comedic project produced by the Boy Boy channel and would gain widespread coverage from Australian media which would help launch Apollonov's comedy career. In the movie, Apollonov and Vulović both travelled to North Korea to investigate dubious claims in Australian media that North Koreans were either forced to cut their hair like Kim Jong Un or that their government orders which hairstyles their citizens are allowed to have. During their investigation, neither Apollonov and Vulović could find any evidence to support the claims of government-mandated hairstyles and came to the conclusion that these stories were most likely fake. "When we started to look into some of those media stories we found out that a lot of them weren't true." Apollonov further described his opinions on Australian/USA relations with the DPRK, saying that "North Korea has tested four [nukes], and that is very scary… but imagine how scary it is for them to think that the US alone has tested 1,032 nukes? … We've used ours… against real people." Vulović shared Apollonov's opinions, saying that "What the haircut law and all these other 'amazing' stories share in common is at the very centre of this media whirlwind, they are based on absolutely nothing."

==== The Hooligans (2018) ====
To investigate news of violence among Russian football hooligans, Apollonov and Vulović travelled to Russia together to interview fans of various Russian football clubs and embedded themselves within groups accused of hooligan violence. Apollonov said that his reasoning for creating this short documentary was that "As a film maker I'd never miss the opportunity to film my mate (Vulović) getting beaten up overseas."

==== COVID casino stunt (2020) ====
During the COVID-19 pandemic, Apollonov and Vulović partnered with The Chaser to create a comedic investigation where they attempted to enter The Star Casino in Sydney while displaying as many symptoms as possible to see whether they would be allowed inside during the pandemic. In one attempt, Vulović tried entering the casino while dressed in hospital surgical garbs, dragging an IV drip stand on wheels, with a high forehead temperature. Despite telling the casino staff that he had come straight from a nearby hospital, he was allowed to enter the casino where he spent his time using the gaming machines while wearing a white shirt saying "I have covid" in bold black letters. "When I rocked up with my hospital gown and drip, the first thing they asked me was whether I had a Star Casino gold membership card". Apollonov followed Vulović into the casino with a forehead temperature of 48°C, or 118.4°F (achieved using heat packs), which the staff detected with a temperature gun and was still allowed entry to the casino. "My head was still really hot after I got inside", said Apollonov. "I must have drunk 3 or 4 of their complimentary water bottles. They're obviously very used to catering for sick customers". When asked about possible legal repercussions over their comedic stunt, Vulović replied: "There's no point suing us, we already lost all our savings on big wheel during our filming breaks". Vulović and Apollonov were subsequently given life bans from entering casinos operated by Star Entertainment Group.

=== I Did a Thing (2018–present) ===
In 2018, Apollonov's new channel "I did a thing" became far more popular than any of his previous comedic projects and would become the channel he is most famous for. Although this channel belongs to Apollonov, most of his content still features and includes Vulović, with whom he created the Boy Boy channel. This new channel features Apollonov constructing a variety of home-designed projects with a particular goal behind each creation.

Many of the videos contain apolitical titles while the content of the videos discuss political issues, such as using an air cannon to test less-than-lethal ammunition, a strategy which Apollonov uses to bring apolitical people into discussions they would not normally encounter. Among other projects, Apollonov has created steel-toed Crocs, experimented with planting trees using rockets, trained wild lizards to eat cockroaches in his home, crafted a flamethrower and a speargun from trash around his house, and sneaked into an arms dealing conference. In 2020, I did a thing reached one million subscribers, awarding Apollonov the Gold Play Button award.

According to Apollonov, "I Did a Thing was mostly for boys like me who might have ADHD and want to make things and break things - do things they aren't allowed to do". In one instance, police searched Apollonov's mother's home in search of a "supersonic tampon gun" that Apollonov had created.

==== 2020 Monolith project ====
In 2020, a mysterious metal monolith of unknown origin appeared in Utah, dubbed the Utah monolith. As more of these monoliths appeared across the globe in England, Romania and the Netherlands, Apollonov teamed up with Australian comedy group Aunty Donna to create their own metal monolith which they planted in Australia. The monolith was planted outside Melbourne, Australia. Aunty Donna jokingly said that their monolith and the collaboration with Apollonov was to promote their upcoming Netflix show.

==== Trademark clashes with Jeremy Clarkson (2022) ====
In early 2022, Apollonov got involved in a clash with the former host of Top Gear, Jeremy Clarkson, over the latter's attempt to trademark the phrase "I did a thing".

Curdle Hill Farm Ltd, a company which Clarkson co-directs alongside his partner, attempted to trademark the phrase "I did a thing", a catchphrase that Clarkson often uses on his show Clarkson's Farm. Clarkson intended to use this trademark to sell merchandise containing the phrase such as hats and cups. Concerned that this would affect the I Did a Thing YouTube channel, Apollonov threatened legal action against Clarkson for the attempt to trademark his channel's name. Using the I Did a Thing Twitter account, Apollonov told Clarkson to "GET FUCKED", and threatened Clarkson with legal action:

"My Cousin's girlfriend's Sister is a lawyer and she is pretty good. You better watch out."

Clarkson responded to Apollonov by claiming that he was not aware of the attempt to trademark the phrase "I did a thing". Apollonov then jokingly threatened to trademark the phrase "Jeremy Clarkson" in Australia and put Clarkson's face on merchandise. Apollonov then went onto a podcast published on the comedy/satire website for The Chaser to jokingly say that he would use his home-made DIY laser guided dart firing drone to fire at one of Clarkson's very fast cars.

==== Creator Clash boxing tournament (2022) ====
In 2022, Apollonov took part in IDubbbz's Creator Clash boxing tournament, which saw various YouTube personalities fight against one another. During the tournament, Apollonov scored an almost immediate victory against his opponent, TheOdd1sOut, defeating him during the first bell. According to reports on the match, Apollonov pleaded with the ref to stop the fight, while noting that Apollonov was far bigger and more muscular than his opponent.

After the match, Apollonov said of Rallison:

"To get in the ring with someone and actually have them hit you in the face and have you hit them in the face is a terrifying thing to do," "He fought well, and good work for having the balls to get in the ring with me."

He revealed in a later video that he had built a vibrating cheating device to put in the pants of a chess player (originally intended for Aleksa Vulović, then later used by Myth) as a parody of the Carlsen–Niemann controversy (This was used in Ludwig Ahgren's Mogul Chess-boxing event).

Apollonov was set to return to the Creator Clash boxing tournament in 2023 but ended up not on the fight card.

==== I put a gun on a robot dog (2022) ====
In 2022, Apollonov travelled to Uvalde, Texas, and created a video titled "I put a gun on a robot dog" featuring his attempt to transform a remote controlled robotic dog into a weaponised drone by strapping a Heckler & Koch MP5 to the back of the robot. This was done in the aftermath of the Uvalde school shooting, and was intended as political commentary to mock the argument of some American politicians that arming teachers would help prevent school shootings.

During the filming of I put a gun on a robot dog (2022), Apollonov worked with several other YouTube personalities, including Aleksa Vulović of the Boy Boy channel, American engineer William Osman, and gun advocate Brandon Herrera. The weaponised dog performed poorly when shooting at static targets, and much of the video consisted of comedic shots of the robot dog stumbling while Lacrimosa by Mozart plays.

Speaking on the mixed success of putting a gun on a robot dog, Apollonov concluded:

"I intended to come here and make something really dangerous, but I've now realized that I can't compete with normal, everyday American life. So instead, I'm going to attempt to help and solve America's school shooting problem by strapping a gun to this robot dog."

One writer for Forbes used Apollonov's robot dog with a gun as an example during a discussion as to whether such weapons would be practical in modern warfare.

== Boxing record ==
1 fight	1 win	0 losses
By knockout	1	0

No.	Result	Record	Opponent	Type	Round, time	Date	Location	Notes
1	Win	2–0	TheOdd1sOut	TKO	1 (5), 1:24	14 May 2022	Yuengling Center, Tampa, Florida, U.S.	
