= Boyinaband =

British musician (born 1987)

- Born: David Paul Brown; 24 August 1987 (age 39); Shrewsbury, Shropshire, England
- Occupations: Musician; songwriter; rapper; actor; comedian; YouTuber
- Years active: 2007–2021

YouTube information
- Channel: Boyinaband
- Years active: 2007–2019
- Genres: Vlog; music; education
- Subscribers: 2.69 million
- Views: 354.29 million
- Musical career
- Genres: Hip hop; electronic; pop; rock; heavy metal; spoken word
- Instruments: Vocals; keyboards; guitar; bass; sampler; turntables
- Member of: You and What Army
- Last updated: 29 May 2026

David Paul Brown (born 24 August 1987), also known by his pseudonym Boyinaband, is an English musician, songwriter, rapper, and YouTuber. Brown is known for his song "Don't Stay in School" and collaborations with other YouTubers such as iDubbbz, Roomie, Andrew Huang, TheOdd1sOut, Jaiden Animations, Emma Blackery, Dan Bull, Corpse Husband, and PewDiePie. His work spans various genres including electronic, hip hop and heavy metal as a producer, vocalist, rapper, songwriter, DJ and instrumentalist.

Among other endeavors are his former electronicore band You and What Army, with whom he won the Red Bull Bedroom Jam in 2010 and toured alongside Kids in Glass Houses.

== Career ==
Brown was mostly raised in the UK, but also spent time living in the United Arab Emirates as a child. He has one sister, Hannah, who also makes YouTube videos. He describes himself as having "hated" music as a child, gravitating towards science and technology over the arts.

Brown started his YouTube channel as a side project for You and What Army.

On 2 February 2015, Brown published the music video for his song "Don't Stay in School", which went viral. In the track, he criticizes the school systems for teaching topics he deems unnecessary, instead of teaching practical life skills or topics that interest students. The song has been subject to controversy for seeming to encourage students to drop out of school. However, Brown has stated that it is merely meant to critique the school system, and the words "Don't Stay in School" refer to the topics discussed in the song. Despite drawing controversy, the song has also received praise from students, teachers and parents. The song peaked at number 11 on the Billboard Comedy Digital Track Sales chart.

Later that year, Brown published the song "Spectrum" featuring fellow YouTubers Cryaotic and Minx focusing on LGBT issues and him voicing his support for the community in collaboration with the UK-based LGBT charity somewhereto_.

In 2017, Brown collaborated with iDubbbz to create a diss track against RiceGum titled "Asian Jake Paul" as part of iDubbbz's Content Cop series. The song peaked at number 24 on the Billboard R&B/Hip-Hop Digital Song Sales chart.

On 31 March 2019, Brown collaborated with PewDiePie and RoomieOfficial in an upbeat rap/synth pop/hip hop music video titled "Congratulations". The music video was based on sarcastically congratulating T-Series in surpassing PewDiePie in subscribers, while also bringing up the corporation's past scandals and criticizing the caste system in India. It peaked at number 1 on the Billboard Comedy Digital Track Sales chart.

Brown has been on a hiatus from online content, citing mental health issues in a 2021 YouTube community post.

== Discography ==
=== Albums ===
- Quite a Lot of Songs (2013)
- Merry Christmix (2013)

=== Singles ===
- "Djentstep" (2012)
- "2.99" (2013)
- "Djentrance" (2013)
- "Midnight" (ft. Veela) (2013)
- "Chipstep" (ft. Andrew Huang) (2013)
- "Djentrap" (2013)
- "Producer Name Rap" (2013)
- "Point at All the Things" (featuring Jack Frags) (2013)
- "Battlefield vs Call of Duty Rap Battle" (featuring Jack Frags) (2013)
- "Hello Monsta" (featuring Minx and Markiplier) (2013)
- "Pointless Fast Rap" (2013)
- "I Am Mildly Annoyed" (featuring Cookiebreed) (2014)
- "Day-Z Hero vs Bandit Rap Battle" (featuring Jack Frags) (2014)
- "That Girl" (featuring Cookiebreed, Patty Walters and VeeOneEye) (2014)
- "Too Much Fun" (featuring Minx) (2014)
- "Limelight" (featuring Cryaotic) (2014)
- "You Look Like a Girl" (2014)
- "How to Get a Number One Song" (featuring Roomie) (2014)
- "Murder" (featuring Minx & Chilled) (2014)
- "Town of Salem" (featuring Minx) (2014)
- "Christmix 4" (2014)
- "Dead Fast Rap" (2014)
- "Don't Stay in School" (2015)
- "Spectrum" (featuring Cryaotic and Minx) (2015)
- "I'm Not Dead" (2016)
- "Top of the Props" (featuring Minx) (2016)
- "Prancer Rap" (featuring TheOdd1sOut) (2018)
- "Dancing With You Forever" (with Party In Backyard) (2024)

=== Collaborations ===
- "Time Bomb" – Feint and Boyinaband (featuring Veela) (2012)
- "Super Mario Dubstep Cypher" – None Like Joshua (featuring Boyinaband, Dan Bull and Veela) (2013)
- "A to Z" – Boyinaband and Andrew Huang (2013)
- "Counter Strike Porch" Dan Bull (featuring Boyinaband) (2014)
- "Xbox One vs. PS4 Rap Battle" – Boyinaband and Oliver Age 24 (2014)
- Xenocide (EP) – Seamless, None Like Joshua and Boyinaband (2014)
- "Bible Rap" – Boyinaband and Dan Bull (2014)
- "A to Z 2" – Andrew Huang and Boyinaband (2014)
- Plants vs. Zombies (EP) – Dan Bull and Boyinaband (2015)
- "Asian Jake Paul" – iDubbbz (featuring Boyinaband) (2017)
- "Empty" (featuring Jaiden Animations) (2018)
- "Life Is Fun" (with TheOdd1sOut) (2018)
- "Congratulations" by PewDiePie (featuring Boyinaband and Roomie) (2019)
- "Luke Skywalker vs Harry Potter" by Epic Rap Battles of History, as Harry Potter (2020)
- "Coco" by PewDiePie (2021)

=== With You and What Army ===
- Soundtrack to the Apocalypse (2009)
- The End of the Beginning (2010)
- You and What Army EP (2012)
