= Creator Clash =

Boxing events

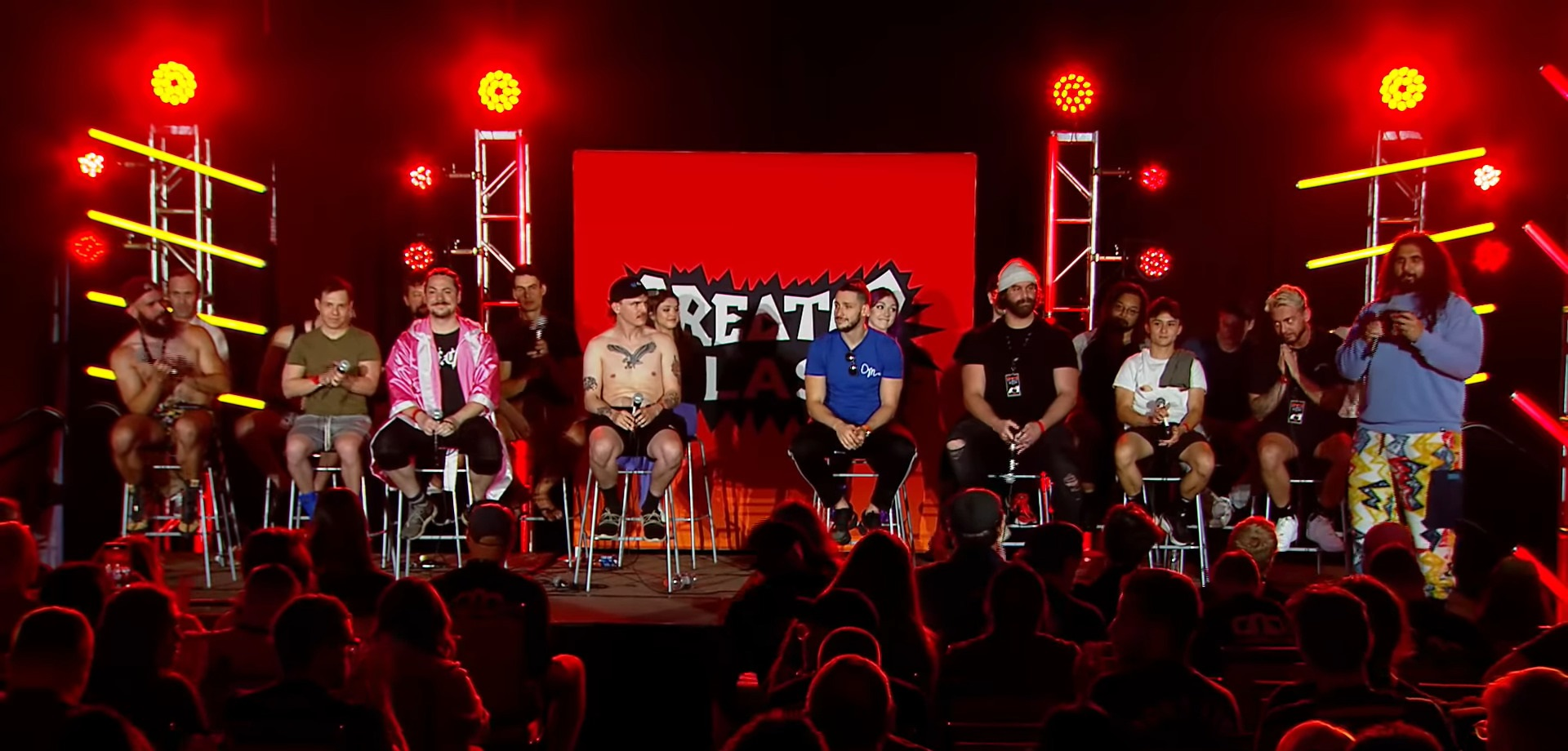
- Various internet personalities at the inaugural Creator Clash press conference

Information
- First date: May 14, 2022
- Last date: April 15, 2023

Events
- Total events: 2

Creator Clash was a recurring charity crossover boxing event co-founded by content creators Ian "iDubbbz" Jomha and Anisa Jomha, in partnership with event management company "Real Good Touring". Creator Clash held two events to varied results. The first event in 2022 sold over 100,000 PPV buys and raised $1.3 million for charity, but the second event in 2023 only sold 50,000 PPV buys and raised $180,000 for charity.

The third event was canceled on July 7, 2025, with a statement also confirming that there would be no future Creator Clash events.

== Creator Clash 1 ==
Creator Clash
- Date: May 14, 2022
- Venue: Yuengling Center, Tampa, Florida, U.S.

Tale of the tape
Boxer	Doctor Mike	iDubbbz
Hometown	Saransk, Russian SFSR, Soviet Union	San Diego, California, U.S.
Pre-fight record	0–0	0–0
Height	6 ft 3 in (191 cm)	6 ft 2 in (188 cm)
Weight	188.0 lb (85.3 kg)	188.0 lb (85.3 kg)
Style	Orthodox	Orthodox

Result
- Doctor Mike defeated iDubbbz via Unanimous Decision.

The inaugural Creator Clash event, billed as Influencer Beatdown, event featured Doctor Mike vs. iDubbbz, a cruiserweight exhibition crossover boxing match contested between Russian-American influencer Doctor Mike and American YouTuber iDubbbz. The event took place on May 14 at the Yuengling Center in Tampa, Florida. Doctor Mike defeated iDubbbz by unanimous decision.

The event sold over 100,000 PPV buys.

=== Background ===
The 2022 event featured many different creators from different genres of content, most who had never previously boxed before starting training for their respective fights. iDubbbz stated that he wanted this event to feel different from previous YouTuber boxing matches and ensured that fighters were taking it seriously. The proceeds of the original Creator Clash, which iDubbbz stated was "1.3 million dollars", were donated to the American Heart Association, the Alzheimer's Association, and the Healing Horse Therapy Center.

The event featured other popular creators such as AB "Starkilla" Ayad of the H3 Podcast, Harley Morenstein (of Epic Meal Time), Arin Hanson (of Game Grumps), TheOdd1sOut, Michael Reeves (of OfflineTV) and Ryan Magee and Matt Watson of SuperMega, and Dad, portrayed by Nathan Barnatt. This event also featured the first fight between female content creators as JustaMinx faced Yodeling Haley. The event was organized by iDubbbz, Jomha, and co-creator Mike Leanardi with the events company Real Good Touring.

=== Card ===
Weight class		vs		Method	Round	Time	Notes
Cruiserweight	Doctor Mike	def.	iDubbbz	UD	5		^{Note 1}
Heavyweight	Harley Morenstein	def.	Arin Hanson	TKO	2/5	1:27
Lightweight	Michael Reeves	def.	Graham Stephan	TKO	2/5	1:45
Cruiserweight	Hundar	def.	AB	TKO	5/5	0:56
Light middleweight	JustaMinx	def.	Yodeling Haley	TKO	4/5	0:47
Cruiserweight	I Did a Thing	def.	TheOdd1sOut	TKO	1/5	1:25
Heavyweight	DJ Welch	def.	Internet Comment Etiquette with Erik	TKO	1/5	2:00
Cruiserweight	Alex Ernst	def.	Ryan Magee	UD	5
Middleweight	Dad	def.	Matt Watson	TKO	1/5	0:22

^Note 1 Originally planned to complete 3 minute rounds for 4.

== Creator Clash 2 ==
Creator Clash 2
- Date: April 15, 2023
- Venue: Amalie Arena, Tampa, Florida, U.S.

Tale of the tape
Boxer	Alex Wassabi	iDubbbz
Hometown	Great Falls, Montana, U.S.	San Diego, California, U.S.
Pre-fight record	0–0 (Professional); 1–0 (Exhibition)	0–0 (Professional); 0–1 (Exhibition)
Height	6 ft 0 in (183 cm)	6 ft 2 in (188 cm)
Weight	167 lb (75 kg)	165 lb (74 kg)
Style	Orthodox	Orthodox

Result
- Wassabi defeated iDubbbz via Majority Decision.

The second event, Creator Clash 2, billed as Influencers Will Pay, featured Alex Wassabi vs. iDubbbz, a super middleweight professional crossover boxing match contested between American YouTuber Alex Wassabi and American YouTuber iDubbbz. The event took place on April 15, 2023 at the Amalie Arena in Tampa, Florida, U.S. Wassabi defeated iDubbbz via majority decision.

The event sold 50,000 PPV buys and lost $250,000, resulting in no money going to charity. According to iDubbbz, he attributed the loss to lack of piracy-prevention measures, venue costs, hotels, additional fights, creators, commentators, and charity partners which cut into the budget.

=== Background ===
The main event was iDubbbz vs. YouTuber Alex Wassabi in a professional bout, with returning fighters including Harley Morenstein, Dad, Hundar, "Yodeling Haley" Sharpe, AB "Starkilla" Ayad, and Arin Hanson. The event also featured former WWE wrestler John Hennigan on the card, YouTubers Jacksepticeye and Markiplier as pre-show hosts, and fight commentary by Wade Plemons, Tony Jeffries, and Charlie White.

On March 26, 2023, it was announced that creator Froggy Fresh had been removed from the card, due to him violating the event’s code of conduct by training with comedian Sam Hyde. Two following statements were produced by the official Twitter account of the event. He was eventually replaced by William Haynes.

=== Card ===
Weight class		vs		Method	Round	Time	Notes
Super middleweight	Alex Wassabi	def.	iDubbbz	MD	4		^{Note 1}
Heavyweight	John Hennigan	def.	Harley Morenstein	TKO	3/5	1:38
Welterweight	CrankGameplays	def.	Leonhart	TKO	3/5	1:34
Lightweight	Michelle Khare	def.	Andrea Botez	UD	5
Heavyweight	Arin Hanson	def.	Jarvis Johnson	TKO	2/5	1:08
Light welterweight	Haley Sharpe	def.	Marisha Ray	UD	5
Cruiserweight	Myth	def.	Hundar	TKO	1/5	2:00
Middleweight	Alanah Pearce	def.	RIPMika	SD	5
Welterweight	William Haynes	def.	Chris Ray Gun	TKO	1/5	1:50
Light heavyweight	Dad	def.	Starkilla	TKO	1/5	2:00
Super flyweight	Jaelaray	def.	Abelina Sabrina	UD	5
Super featherweight	Jack Manifold	def.	Dakota Olave	UD	5

^Note 1 Wassabi and iDubbbz's professional debut

== Cancelled Creator Clash 3 ==
On January 29, 2025, the official Twitter account for Creator Clash announced a third event to take place sometime in 2025. On February 4, it was announced that Creator Clash 3, billed as Influencers Will Pay, would take place on June 28 at the Amalie Arena in Tampa, Florida, once again. The event was later delayed to October 25, 2025, with a venue change to the Hollywood Palladium in Los Angeles, California.

Renewed online disputes, most prominently a high-profile conflict between Ian and Ethan Klein, contributed to negative publicity and withdrawal of several scheduled participants, and the event was subsequently cancelled on July 7, 2025. An accompanying statement confirmed that there would be no future Creator Clash events, that anyone who purchased a pay-per-view would be automatically refunded, and that the raised funds would be distributed to charity.
