= Matt Watson (YouTuber) =

American YouTuber, comedian, and musician

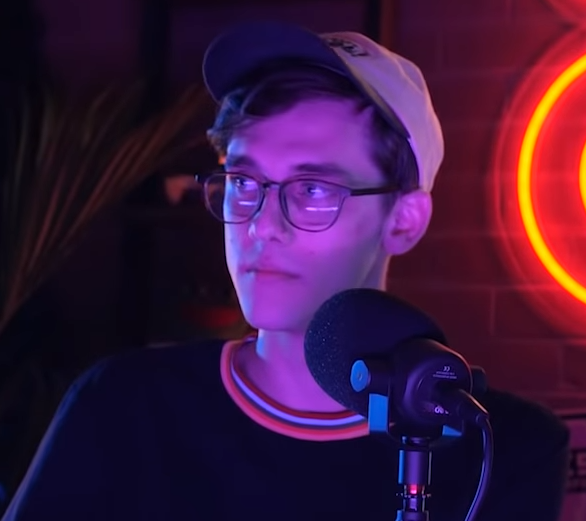
- Watson in 2019
- Born: February 5, 1996 (age 30)
- Occupations: YouTuber; comedian; musician; podcaster

YouTube information
- Channel: SuperMega
- Years active: 2014–present
- Genres: Sketch comedy; music; gaming; vlog
- Subscribers: 1 million
- Views: 487 million
- Last updated: May 15, 2026

Matthew Watson (born February 5, 1996) is an American YouTuber, comedian, musician, and podcaster. Alongside Ryan Magee, he is the co-creator and co-host of the variety-comedy YouTube channel SuperMega, which has over 1 million subscribers on the site. SuperMega's videos include comedy sketches, Let's Plays, vlogs, movie commentary tracks, and their weekly video podcast, The SuperMega Podcast.

Watson grew up in South Carolina, and started making sketches for YouTube in 2008. Upon moving to California in 2015, he joined Magee and Daniel Kyre in both producing their comedy channel Cyndago, as well as editing videos for Markiplier, one of YouTube's most popular creators. Cyndago disbanded soon after due to Kyre's death. In 2016, Watson and Magee created SuperMega, and stopped working for Markiplier. From 2016 to 2019, the duo edited and often guest hosted the popular Let's Play channel Game Grumps. In 2022, Watson and Magee published the comedy novel SuperMega Saves the Troops, depicting themselves in an alternate history of the 2011 killing of Osama bin Laden.

Watson started his music career by making comedy rap videos for his various YouTube projects. The video for Cyndago's 2015 rap song "Blonde Boyz" has gained 12 million views on the site. Since 2018, SuperMega has released seven albums in the annual Nathan's Christmas series of parody Christmas music, (Note: Watson did not release one for Christmas 2023, during SuperMega's brief hiatus that year.) which Watson performs as his character Nathan. With Watson's debut EP Ouch! (2020), he began making solo indie pop and synth pop music, with less- or non-comedic tones; he continued this style on his debut album See You There (2022). (Note: This was his debut album as "Matt Watson"; the Nathan's Christmas albums, some of which released prior to See You There, are credited on streaming services as the work of the "Nathan" character.)

== Early life ==
Watson was born on February 5, 1996, to Ann and Dale Watson, and grew up in Charleston, South Carolina. He was raised as a Christian. In 2014, he graduated from the Charleston County School of The Arts.

== YouTube career ==
=== Formatt24, Kids w/ Problems, Markiplier, and Cyndago (2008–2016) ===
Watson began creating videos in 2008 on his channel Formatt24, where he and his cousin Forest created various sketches. They stopped uploading to the channel in 2010. In August 2014, Watson began uploading sketches on a new channel called Kids w/ Problems.

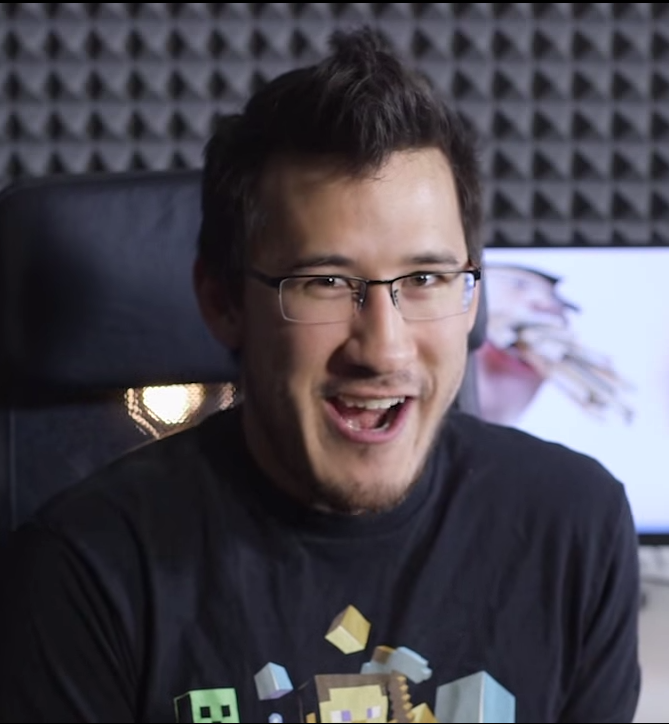
From 2015 to 2016, Watson edited YouTube videos for Mark Fischbach, or "Markiplier"

In July 2015, after Watson finished his first year of college at the University of South Carolina, he moved to Los Angeles to pursue a career in sketch comedy. He started working as a video editor for one of the most popular YouTubers, Mark Fischbach, commonly known as Markiplier. Fischbach's channel features sketches, vlogs, and gaming videos, and at the time, he was living in a house with his two other editors, Ryan Magee and Daniel Kyre. Magee and Kyre were concurrently producing Cyndago, a channel which posted sketches and comedic music videos, and which was gaining a cult following after a few of its videos had become viral hits. Watson moved into Fischbach's house, and in August 2015, he departed Kids w/ Problems when he became the third main member of Cyndago.

Watson's time on Cyndago did not last long; in September, Daniel Kyre died by suicide, and Watson and Magee stopped uploading to the channel. Cyndago's last upload, a video tribute to Kyre, was posted on October 11. Following this, Watson returned to producing Kids w/ Problems, with Magee becoming its co-creator. In 2016, the two of them stopped working for Fischbach; the latter stated that Watson and Magee found it difficult to maintain their friendships with him while being his employees.

=== SuperMega (2016–present) ===
On April 12, 2016, Watson and Ryan Magee started their own variety comedy YouTube channel, SuperMega. The channel consists of Let's Plays, sketch comedy, music videos, and a podcast. The channel's videos have had multiple editors over the years, including Justin "Nothinbutlag", and Luke Heddy. In July 2019, a 2016 video in which Watson and Magee play Pokémon Go at Area 51 went viral after memes surrounding the Storm Area 51 Facebook event became popular.

==== NASCAR sponsorship ====
On May 19, 2021, Martins Motorsports, an American stock car racing team competing in the NASCAR Cup Series, announced that during the 2021 Coca-Cola 600 in North Carolina on May 30, SuperMega would serve as the primary sponsor of the team's No. 44 Chevrolet Camaro. Driven by Tommy Joe Martins, the car sported a SuperMega-themed livery during the race. Tommy Joe Martins said that YouTubers sponsoring a car was "incredibly different to anything [done before with a] NASCAR sponsorship". Michael Carey wrote for racing website TobyChristie that Watson and Magee's presence at the race could "place NASCAR in front of new eyes" and "help the sport grow into the younger demographic"—as well as bring attention to Martins Motorsports, who were in their sophomore season in the Cup Series, and seen as an underdog. Tommy Joe Martins ultimately did not finish the race, retiring the car after 186 laps due to an accident.

==== SuperMega Saves The Troops ====
On December 7, 2021, Watson and Magee published a comedy fiction novel, SuperMega Saves the Troops, set in a Christian-themed alternate history universe. The book stars the duo themselves, in a scenario in which the United States Navy SEALs who were sent to Pakistan in 2011 to kill al-Qaeda leader Osama bin Laden became trapped, and then relied on Watson and Magee, "top servicemen" of Jesus, to be saved and finish their mission.

==== 2022 lawsuit against employee ====
On March 28, 2022, in the Superior Court of Los Angeles County, Watson and Magee filed a lawsuit against their former employee, Jackson Tucker, for embezzlement of at least $60,985.30 from SuperMega Prod., Inc. between January 2020 and February 2022. They alleged Tucker, who had been SuperMega's social media manager, used the company's official credit card to continuously buy "unquestionably personal expenses"—such as Steely Dan-themed sweatpants—despite being entrusted to use it for specifically company-related expenses. In a case presided by Theresa M. Traber, SuperMega's lawyer Kelley Paul M. required that Tucker fully compensate the company for the charges.

==== 2023 firing of channel artist ====
In July 2023, Lex "Updog", the ex-girlfriend of SuperMega's former artist, Don, alleged that Don sexually assaulted her in 2021—and that after Watson and Magee heard of this and fired Don, they only partially cut contact with him. Lex characterized this as the duo attempting to downplay or cover-up the assault to protect their brand. Another former employee, Leighton, then alleged that Watson had been privately homophobic and racist. SuperMega became "steeped in [online] controversy," and the duo apologized for some allegations, and refuted others. They apologized for not completely cutting contact with Don, claiming that after firing him, they assumed he would face further consequences for his alleged actions even without their involvement, so they prioritized their stressful workload instead. Watson refuted having been homophobic or racist. In August 2023, the duo announced an indefinite hiatus from producing SuperMega, the hiatus ending in February 2024.

Media outlets were sympathetic towards Watson and Magee after their responses. Steven Asarch wrote for The Daily Dot that SuperMega survived the controversy because the duo had made "terrible missteps" rather than more scandalous decisions. The staff of The Mary Sue wrote that while the duo had acted "dismissive and harmful" towards Lex, "their apologies seemed genuinely remorseful, and I don’t think they are bad people."

=== Game Grumps (2016–2019) ===
In the summer of 2016, while working on SuperMega, Watson and Magee became the new editors of Game Grumps, a popular YouTube channel focused on comedic Let's Plays, after the departure of the channel's at the time editor, Kevin Abernathy. Game Grumps' various shows are hosted by either Arin Hanson, Dan Avidan, or, during Watson and Magee's tenure, Ross O'Donovan. As editors, the duo appeared on the channel as guest hosts multiple times, both in Let's Plays and live action videos. On May 3, 2019, Watson and Magee announced they were leaving the channel to focus solely on SuperMega.

=== Epic SMP (2021) ===
On January 14, 2021, Watson announced the creation of Epic SMP, a collaboration with 41 other online content creators—including Hanson, O'Donovan, Markiplier and Jacksfilms—to simultaneously play on a single private online multiplayer Minecraft server while live streaming their various in-game perspectives on YouTube or Twitch. The project's basic concept was inspired by prior similar "SMP" Minecraft multiplayer collaborations, like the Hermitcraft and Dream SMP servers. Zackerie Fairfax later wrote for Screen Rant that Watson's server briefly became one of the "three major" SMP projects, alongside the aforementioned two, until its activity declined after about a month.

== Music career ==
=== Musical comedy and music videos (2015–2020) ===
Watson started his music career by making comedic songs for his various YouTube projects. In 2015, Cyndago uploaded the video for their parody song "Blonde Boyz", which went viral by 2020, and has received 12 million views. Watson and Magee continued making comedic music videos for SuperMega, such as "My Two Lovely Uncles" and "Skater Boy and Friendly Cop". Since 2018, SuperMega has uploaded seven albums in the annual Nathan's Christmas series of parody Christmas music, which Watson performs as his character Nathan. This excludes 2023, when SuperMega went on hiatus.

In 2019, Watson directed the music video for "Cha Cha" by rapper Freddie Dredd; it was the first work released by Lazy Eye, a music video production company founded by Watson and his friends.

On March 26, 2020, amidst the growing pandemic of COVID-19 in the U.S., Watson released "Covid-19 type beat", a rap song and accompanying music video where he gives advice for avoiding and not spreading the disease, such as not going to crowded public areas. Joseph Earp wrote for Junkee that the song was "basically [a] genuine masterpiece" for its lyrics and catchiness, and "legitimately excellent" compared to other musicians' PSAs about the disease.

=== Indie pop and synth pop projects (2020–present) ===
Watson began making non-comedic music in early 2020, when he produced his debut EP, Ouch!, while quarantining during the COVID-19 pandemic. It released later that year on September 4, becoming the number one trending topic on Twitter that day. On Ouch!, a work of pop music with elements of bedroom pop, indie rock, and chiptune music, Watson sings and occasionally raps. His vocals are muffled and somewhat quiet, an intentional lo-fi production style which created mixed opinions among listeners; KJHK writer Griffin Lowry favorably compared it to the indie rock band Car Seat Headrest. Lowry wrote that the EP "[isn’t] anything groundbreaking", but is nonetheless "consistent, fun, laid-back", and "a promising look" into Watson's foray into non-comedic music. On August 7, 2021, he released the single "Bored".

On October 22, 2021, Watson released the single "Monopoly", a synth-pop and R&B song. In the song, he raps over a "dreamy beat" with lyrics which alternate between braggadocios and self-deprecating comedy. In its accompanying music video, Watson raps the song's lyrics while sitting in a bathtub filled with fake money from the titular board game Monopoly. In a review of the song for Impact 89FM, Norene Bassin wrote that Watson "can make good music" unlike most YouTubers who try to do so.

Watson released his debut album as "Matt Watson", See You There, on November 7, 2022. He worked on the album for 2 years. Its opening track, Starstud, features Sarah Midori Perry of the pop band Kero Kero Bonito.

== Personal life ==
In 2022, Watson said that after using LSD when he was 22, he acquired Hallucinogen persisting perception disorder, in which a non-psychotic person experiences long-lasting hallucinations or visual distortions (such as visual snow) as an adverse reaction to a certain drug. In 2024, Watson also said he takes medication for narcolepsy.

Watson has a non-speaking role in an episode of the HBO comedy series Vice Principals (2016–2017), as one of a group of people who hit on high school student Janelle Gamby (played by Maya Love) to no effect.

Watson and Magee have said that in November 2016, after Donald Trump won the 2016 U.S. presidential election, the two of them were illegally arrested in Los Angeles while watching a peaceful anti-Trump protest from a distance, and that a police officer confiscated and illegally searched Watson's phone to make fun of his text conversations in front of others who were arrested.

On May 14, 2022, at age 26, Watson fought a boxing match against 41-year-old YouTuber Nathan Barnatt, known as "Dad", during iDubbbz's Creator Clash charity event in Tampa, Florida. Watson lost in a technical knockout after 22 seconds. After the fight, he challenged YouTubers Ian Hecox and Lucas Cruikshank to fights, but they declined. Joe Rogan criticized the fight by saying Barnatt made an audience "[watch] you beat up your son" and "definitely [give him] brain damage"; he mistakenly believed Barnatt was Watson's father.

== Solo discography ==
=== As Matt Watson ===
==== Albums ====
Title	Album details	Refs.
See You There	Release date: November 7, 2022; Label: Awful treasures inc.	

==== EPs ====
Title	EP details	Refs.
Ouch!	Release date: September 4, 2020; Label: Lazy Eye Records	
Ouch! Expansion Pack	Release date: November 25, 2022; Label: Awful treasures inc.	

==== Singles ====
Title	Single details	Refs.
"No Nut November" (feat. Freddie Dredd, Kill Bill, and Carson Tucker)	Release date: November 11, 2019; Label: Lazy Eye Records	
"Covid-19 Type Beat"	Release date: March 26, 2020; Self-published by Watson	
"Bored"	Release date: August 7, 2021; Label: Awful treasures inc.	
"Monopoly"	Release date: October 22, 2021; Label: Awful treasures inc.	
"I'm Sick" (co-artist with Adam Kane)	Release date: December 11, 2021; Self-published by Kane	
"Space Song"	Release date: February 16, 2022; Cover of the song by Beach House; Label: Awful treasures inc.	
"Balance"	Release date: September 9, 2022; Label: Awful treasures inc.	
"Ring Pop" (feat. Father)	Release date: September 29, 2022; Label: Awful treasures inc.	
"Starstud" (feat. Sarah Bonito)	Release date: October 28, 2022; Label: Awful treasures inc.	
"Flip Phone"	Release date: June 2, 2023; Self-published by Watson	

==== Singles as featured artist ====
Artist	Title	Release date	Refs.
FrankJavCee	"Omegawave1986"	Release date: December 12, 2016; Self-published by FrankJavCee	
AlsoJakob	"New Friends"	Release date: June 26, 2021; Label: Offcanny Records	

=== As "Nathan" ===
Title	Release date	Refs.
Nathan's Christmas Vol. 1	Release date: December 20, 2018; Published by Watson/SuperMega	
Nathan's Christmas Vol. 2	Release date: December 15, 2019; Published by Watson/SuperMega	
Nathan's Christmas Vol. 3	Release date: December 20, 2020; Published by Watson/SuperMega	
Nathan's Christmas Vol. 4	Release date: December 17, 2021; Published by Watson/SuperMega	
Nathan's Christmas Vol. 5	Release date: December 20, 2022; Published by Watson/SuperMega	
Nathan's Christmas Vol. 6	Release date: December 24, 2024; Published by Watson/SuperMega	
Nathan's Christmas Vol. 7	Release date: December 24, 2025; Published by Watson/SuperMega	

== Filmography ==
=== Music video production ===
Artist	Song title	Video details	Refs.
SuperMega	"My 2 Lovely Uncles" (feat. Oney)	Release date: September 2, 2017; Role: Editor	
SuperMega	"Skater Boy and Friendly Cop"	Release date: December 16, 2017; Role: Editor	
Freddie Dredd	"Cha Cha"	Release date: December 18, 2019; Role: Co-director with Carson Tucker	
Emmitt James	"Toes"	Release date: January 24, 2020; Role: Co-director with Carson Tucker, Harrison Tucker, and Jackson Tucker	
FrankJavCee	"I Love Hating You"	Release date: July 1, 2020; Role: Co-director with Carson Tucker and Harrison Tucker	
Slater	"Load Up The Docs"	Release date: October 23, 2020; Role: Co-director with Carson Tucker, Harrison Tucker, and Jackson Tucker	
Matt Watson	"Bored"	Release date: August 7, 2021; Role: Co-director and co-editor with Tucker Prescott	
Matt Watson	"Balance"	Release date: 2022; Role: Co-director with Tucker Prescott, editor	

=== Television ===
Title	Notes	Refs.
Vice Principals	Episode: "The Principal" (Uncredited)	

=== Web ===
Year	Title	Role	Notes	Ref.
2026	Gameoverse	Crab Girl		

== Bibliography ==
Book	Book details	Refs.
SuperMega Saves the Troops (co-authored with Ryan Magee)	Publication date: December 7, 2021; Publisher: SuperMegaProd, Inc.	

== Boxing record ==
1 fight	0 wins	1 loss
By knockout	0	1

No.	Result	Record	Opponent	Type	Round, time	Date	Location	Refs.
1	Loss	0–1	Dad	TKO	1 (5), 0:22	May 14, 2022	Yuengling Center, Tampa, Florida, U.S.	
