= Jarvis Johnson (internet personality) =

American YouTuber (born 1992)

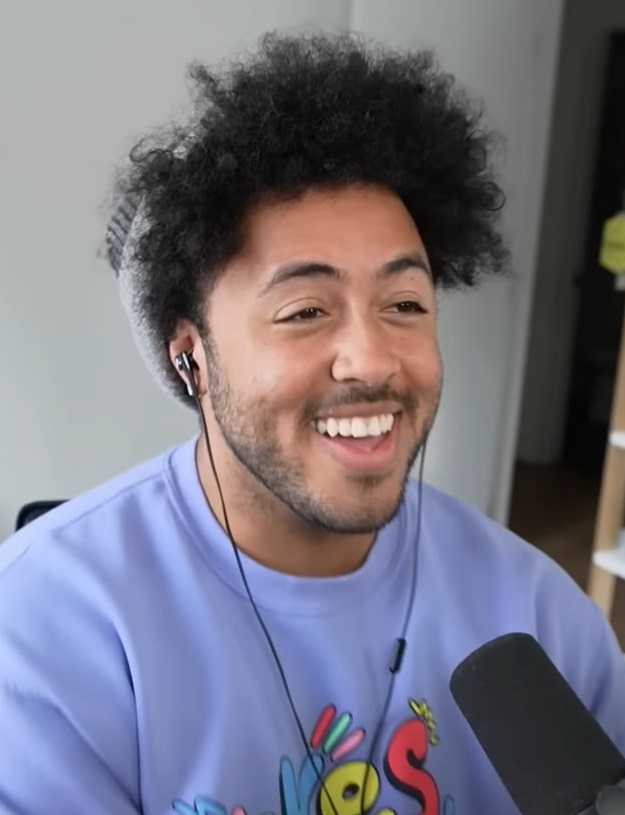
- Johnson in 2022
- Born: Jarvis Allen Johnson; May 5, 1992 (age 34); Gainesville, Florida, U.S.
- Education: Eastside High School (2006–2010); Georgia Institute of Technology (2010–2014)
- Years active: 2006–present

Twitch information
- Channel: jarvisjohnson
- Followers: 141 thousand (main channel); 161.8 thousand (combined) (Note: Followers, broken down by channel: 141 thousand (jarvisjohnson) 20.8 thousand (SadBoyzPod))

YouTube information
- Channels: Jarvis Johnson; Jarvis Johnson! Gold; Sad Boyz
- Years active: 2017-present
- Subscribers: 2.1 million (main channel); 4.22 million (combined) (Note: Subscribers, broken down by channel: 2.1 million (Jarvis Johnson) 1.3 million (Jarvis Johnson! GOLD) 176 thousand (Jarvis Johnson! LIVE) 45.9 thousand (Jarvis Johnson! Pro) 4.26 thousand (Jarvis Johnson! Short) 46.1 thousand (Jarvis Johnson Tech [Inactive]) 206 thousand (Sad Boyz Highlights) 282 thousand (Sad Boyz) 69.5 thousand (THEY ACTUALLY ANIMATED MY STORY))
- Views: 264.60 million (main channel); 653.74 million (combined) (Note: Views, broken down by channel: 264.60 million (Jarvis Johnson) 176.06 million (Jarvis Johnson! GOLD) 41.16 million (Jarvis Johnson! LIVE) 1.56 million (Jarvis Johnson! Pro) 270.53 thousand (Jarvis Johnson! Short) 479.43 thousand (Jarvis Johnson Tech [Inactive]) 109.96 million (Sad Boyz Highlights) 57.65 million (Sad Boyz) 2.01 million (THEY ACTUALLY ANIMATED MY STORY))
- Jarvis Johnson's voice Johnson talking in a YouTube video in October 2022.
- Last updated: June 10, 2026

Jarvis Allen Johnson (born May 5, 1992) is a YouTuber, podcaster, and a former software engineer. He is known for his comedic content and social commentary. As of 2026, his numerous YouTube channels have collectively earned over 4 million subscribers and 650 million views.

== Early life ==
Jarvis Allen Johnson was born via caesarean section on May 5, 1992, in Gainesville, Florida. His mother died when he was a child. He has a younger brother, and an older sister whom he met when he was around 12.

Johnson was educated at Eastside High School between 2006 and 2010, where he graduated with an International Baccalaureate diploma. He chose to attend his second choice university, the Georgia Institute of Technology, in 2010 after being rejected from his first choice, Carnegie Mellon, which he has stated "ended up being ... the best choice for [him]." He graduated on August 2, 2014, with a Bachelor of Science high honors degree in computer science.

Johnson worked at various places before starting his YouTube channel. These included the Georgia Institute of Technology, Radiant Systems, Google, Yelp, and Patreon.

== Career ==
Johnson's YouTube channel was created on October 12, 2006. He held multiple jobs before he began regularly uploading to the channel. He has worked as a teaching assistant at the Georgia Institute of Technology, a software developer intern at Radiant Systems, an engineering practicum intern at Google, a software engineer intern and a software engineer at Yelp, and a senior software engineer and an engineering manager at Patreon. In 2017, while working at Patreon, Johnson met fellow YouTuber Jordan Adika, who he would go on to collaborate with frequently.

Initially, Johnson's channel focused on software engineering; he would later begin making commentary videos after watching an upload from Drew Gooden and trying his hand at Gooden's format. He soon quit his job at Patreon to post regularly on his channel. In August 2018, traffic to Johnson's channel increased after fellow YouTuber Cody Ko uploaded a video about 5-Minute Crafts, a topic that Johnson had already spoken about in March. As Johnson's video wasn't getting much traffic, Johnson saw Ko's video and decided to update his video's title to include "5-Minute Crafts" to attract more viewers. Johnson credited this video as his "breakout video."

Johnson's channel consists of commentaries on trending topics and events from various social media networks. The channel notably serves as a platform for active, though light-hearted, critique on content farms and their ability to game YouTube algorithms, bringing to attention questionable and sometimes dangerous life hacks, "pro tips", and trends. In early 2021, Johnson was listed as one of Forbes' "30 under 30" list of influential people for that year.

Together with Jordan Adika, Johnson hosts a podcast called Sad Boyz, typically uploading weekly and covering a range of topics across the hosts' own lives and current events in the world. Sad Boyz was created with toxic masculinity in mind, as the pair have stated a desire to normalize men talking openly about their feelings.

In May 2021, Johnson posted a video on Twitter captioned "what a normal and ultimate spaghetti hack!" The video consisted of a woman pouring Prego sauce onto a kitchen counter. The tweet gained international recognition, and Prego ended up on the trending page on Twitter. The video in the tweet was then taken down by the creator of the video, Rick Lax, two days later.

In July 2021, Rhett and Link announced that their production company, Mythical Entertainment, had acquired an ownership stake in the umbrella company Johnson founded for his various revenue streams.

== Boxing record ==
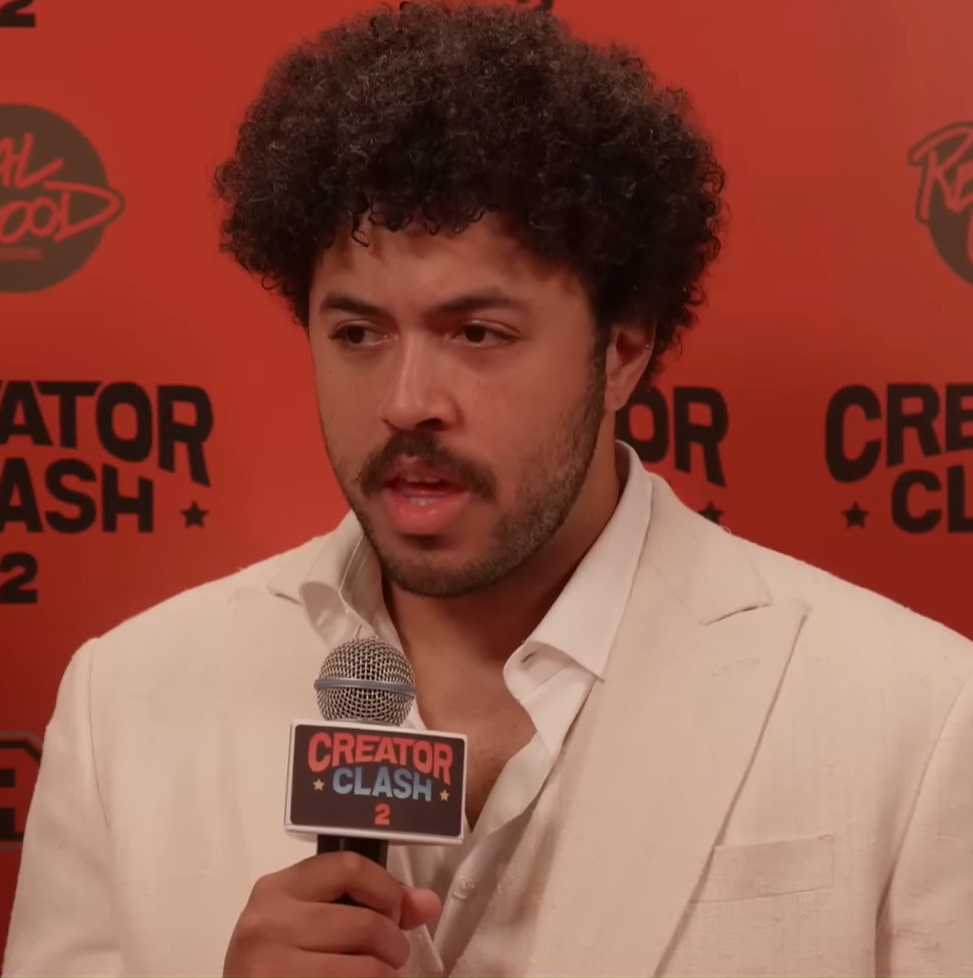
Johnson during a post-show interview at the 2023 Creator Clash

1 fight	0 wins	1 loss
By decision	0	1

No.	Result	Record	Opponent	Type	Round, time	Date	Location	Notes
1	Loss	0–1	Arin Hanson	TKO	2 (5)	April 15, 2023	Amalie Arena, Tampa, Florida, U.S.	

== Awards and nominations ==
Year	Award	Category	Result	Ref.
2020	11th Shorty Awards	YouTube Comedian	Nominated	
2020	10th Streamy Awards	Commentary	Nominated	
2021	11th Streamy Awards	Commentary	Nominated	
2021	Forbes 30 Under 30	Social Media	Included	
2022	12th Streamy Awards	Commentary	Nominated	
