= Roomie (internet personality) =

Swedish musician and YouTuber (born 1988)

Joel Berghult
- Born: Joel Gustaf Berghult; 8 April 1988 (age 38); Lerum, Sweden
- Other names: Roomie; Lil Pitchy
- Occupations: YouTuber; singer-songwriter; music producer

Twitch information
- Channel: RoomieOfficial
- Years active: 2022–present
- Followers: 29.8 thousand

YouTube information
- Channels: RoomieOfficial; RoomieTalks; Roomie Responds
- Years active: 2010–present
- Genres: Vlog; commentary; music; comedy
- Subscribers: 7.40 million (RoomieOfficial); 113 thousand (Roomie Talks); 3.86 thousand (Roomie Responds)
- Views: 1.61 billion (RoomieOfficial); 60.0 thousand (Roomie Talks); 22.4 thousand (Roomie Responds)
- Musical career
- Genres: Pop
- Instruments: Vocals; drums; bass; guitar; keyboards
- Last updated: 19 June 2026

Joel Gustaf Berghult (Swedish pronunciation: [ˈjuːɛl ˈɡɵ̌sta(v) ˈbærˌhɵlt]; born 8 April 1988), known professionally as Roomie, is a Swedish YouTuber, singer-songwriter, and producer.

He is best known for his YouTube channel RoomieOfficial, which consists of music commentary, original songs, covers, comedy, and more music-related content. He has posted several viral videos and collaborations with PewDiePie (Felix Kjellberg), TheOdd1sOut (James Rallison), and Boyinaband (David Brown). His most popular video is "One Guy, 43 Voices (with music)", featuring vocal imitations of popular singers such as Justin Bieber, Charlie Puth, and Brendon Urie. His main YouTube channel has 7.4 million subscribers as of June 2026.

In 2020, while on a hiatus from daily YouTube uploads, he started to release music under the name Lil Pitchy.

== Personal life ==
Joel Gustaf Berghult was born on 8 April 1988 in Lerum east of Gothenburg, Sweden. His father, Bosse Berghult, is also a musician and had encouraged his musical endeavors growing up by providing him with instruments and high-tech music production software, including drums.

He used to play in a small band with his college friends. Berghult graduated in 2014 from Musikmakarna, where he studied songwriting and music production.

Berghult moved to London, England, in 2015. He moved to Los Angeles, California, in 2021. He revealed that he moved back to Sweden in March 2025 in the video "I played "Viva La Vida" by Coldplay on 20 guitars at once".

== Career ==
Berghult started his YouTube channel in 2010. In 2014, he rose to prominence by uploading a series of celebrity singer impressions. The first of which was titled "One Guy, 14 Voices" which became the first of Berghult's many viral videos. The next year Berghult released a follow-up "One Guy, 15 Voices" in August 2015. He was subsequently invited to perform on Nyhetsmorgon in September 2015, followed by Good Morning America that October. The most recent of the series, released in 2017, is "One Guy, 43 Voices (with music)" which has over 98 million views and is Berghult's most viewed video as of January 2026.

In 2014, Berghult began to release music with fellow Swedish YouTuber PewDiePie (who is also a Gothenburg native). The single "His Name is Pewdiepie" was released in 2014 and was made using samples of PewDiePie's voice; later that year, "Fabulous" was released, followed by "Brofist" in 2016. In 2019, Berghult again teamed up with PewDiePie and longtime collaborator Boyinaband on the song "Congratulations". The song peaked at number one on the US Comedy Digital Track Sales published by Billboard and has over 200 million views on YouTube as of 2021.

In December 2019, Berghult uploaded daily videos as part of a series called "Daily December". In response to positive feedback, he continued releasing daily videos. He grew discontent with the daily upload schedule, and announced a hiatus from YouTube on 11 June 2020, which lasted until 22 July. On 20 July 2020, while still on break, Berghult released an album single "Livin' For That" on Spotify under the name Lil Pitchy. The album consists of the song "Livin' For That", plus its instrumental and a cappella versions. On 31 May 2021, Berghult announced another hiatus from YouTube. He cited fatigue from uploading daily videos, and wanting to shift focus to larger-scale projects. He ended that hiatus on 28 September, with the video "We Bought 100 Microphones To Do This...".

== Discography ==
=== Solo albums ===
- Short and Stupid (2016)

=== Singles ===
- "Bed Intruder Song" (Rock Version) (2011)
- "Fabulous" (feat. PewDiePie) (2014)
- "His Name Is Pewdiepie" (feat. PewDiePie) (2014)
- "Numb" (2014)
- "Won't Back Down" (2014)
- "Long Distance Love" (2015)
- "Brofist" (feat. PewDiePie) (2016)
- "Zelda" (2017)
- "Lost It All" (feat. custom phase) (2017)
- "Own You" (2018)
- "Roxanne / Roxanne" (2020) – mashup of the Arizona Zervas song and the Police song
- "Slideshow" (2020)
- "Livin' for That" (2020, as Lil Pitchy)
- "Worth It" (2021)
- "Just For You" (2021, as Lil Pitchy)
- "It Kills Me" (2021, as Lil Pitchy)
- "Until I Have You" (2022, as Lil Pitchy)
- "So Selfish" (2023)

=== Collaborations ===
- Roomie & Friends: Covers Vol. 1 (2014) – Roomie & Friends
- "How to Get a Number One Song" (2014) – Boyinaband (feat. Roomie)
- "Circle of Death (Pubg Song)" (2018) – Dan Bull, Roomie, & The Living Tombstone
- Pizza Love (2018) – The Gregory Brothers (feat. Roomie)
- "Congratulations" (2019) – Roomie, PewDiePie, & Boyinaband
- "Good Person" (2020) – Roomie & TheOdd1sOut

== Awards and nominations ==
Year	Ceremony	Category	Nominee	Result	Ref.
2015	Guldtuben	Artist of the Year	Roomie	Nominated	
2018	iHeartRadio Music Awards	Social Star Award	RoomieOfficial	Nominated	
