= William Haynes (comedian) =

American podcaster and YouTuber (born 1993)

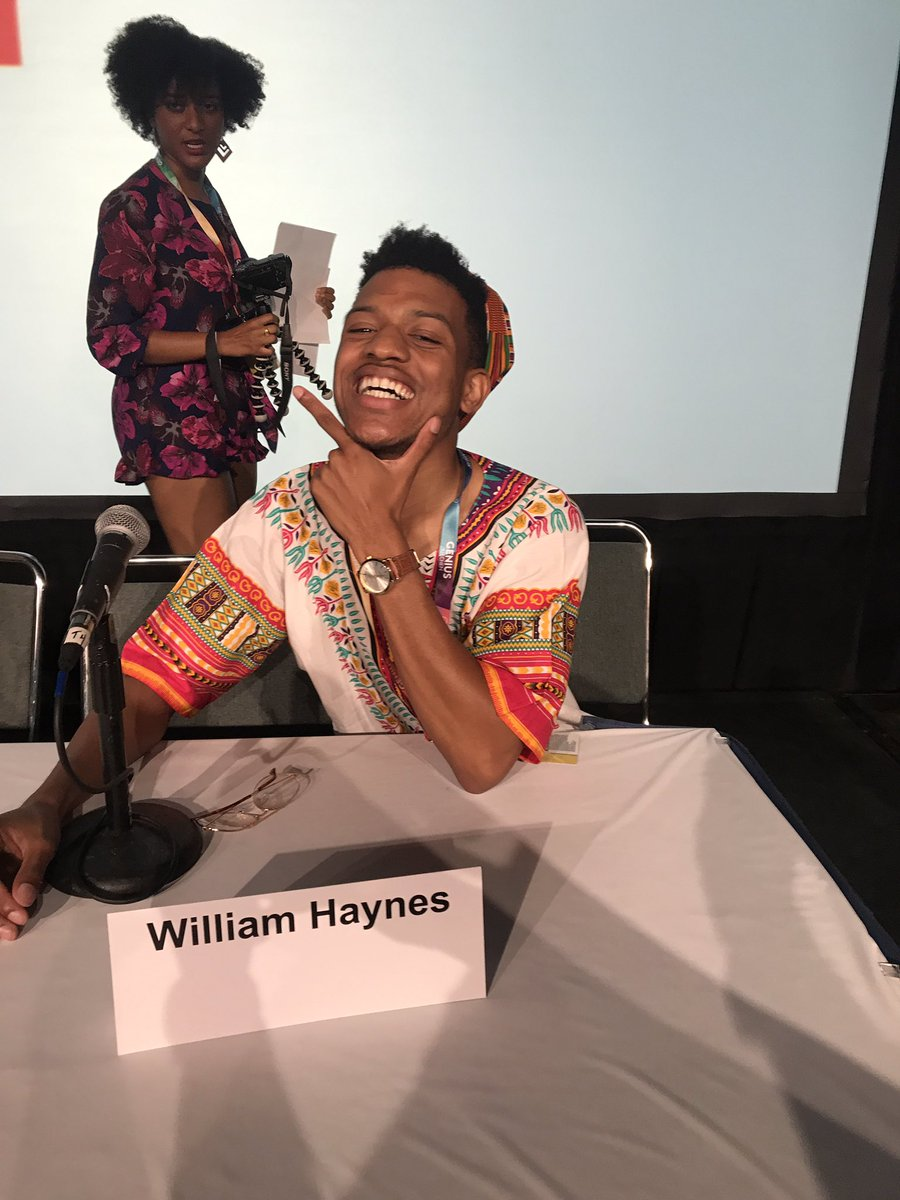
- Haynes at VidCon 2017
- Born: William Washington James Haynes; October 2, 1993 (age 32); Oakland, California
- Occupations: Host; YouTuber; musician; actor

YouTube information
- Channels: People Be Like; WilliamHaynesTV
- Years active: 2009–present
- Last updated: February 24, 2020

William Washington James Haynes (born October 2, 1993) is an American YouTube and TV personality, rapper, and podcast host. Haynes was a personality on SourceFed, SourceFedNERD, and People Be Like, a Haynes-centric channel from SourceFed where he hosts People Be Like, Deep Dive, and Politics Be Like. On his personal channel, WilliamHaynesTV, he hosts a variety comedy-based videos. Haynes hosted the HeadGum network podcast, She Didn't Text Back, alongside musician-rapper Daren Vongirdner (aka DVG). In July 2017, Haynes premiered as a host on Disney XD's The IGN Show.

As a musician, he goes by the name Arsenio Silverstone.

== Personal life ==
Haynes was born in Oakland, California and raised in Richmond, California in the San Francisco Bay Area. He attended John F. Kennedy High School in Richmond.

== Career ==
=== Early YouTube videos ===
Haynes began creating short "comedy" vlogs and life observations in 2008. Many in response to the Obama v. McCain election. Much of his early material featured self-deprecating humor focusing on being nerdy and not fitting into mainstream society. He often referred to his audience as the "Nerdy Nation" and would end his videos with the catch-phrase "Give peace a chance."

In 2012, he participated in "Creators Invade London" by making videos about the 2012 Summer Olympics. He was part of WheezyWaiter's "Team Super Jackal Hawk Tiger Explosion!."

=== SourceFed ===
Before Haynes became a SourceFed host, he worked for Discovery's The Philip DeFranco Show branch as an editor. He made his first appearance as a featured host in January 2014. Haynes appeared on a variety of shows on SourceFed including TableTalk, The SourceFed Podcast, People Be Like and 5 Things with Lee Newton, the most popular of which were People Be Like and Politics Be Like. People Be Like started in August 2014 and was originally hosted on the main SourceFed channel. The last video was posted March 24, 2017. In 2015, he launched People Be Like as its own channel and platform. SourceFed announced its ending on March 20, 2017.

=== She Didn't Text Back ===
In April 2015, Haynes and Daren Vongirdner started She Didn't Text Back, a podcast discussing relationships, comedy, music and their everyday lives. The two talked about their careers, life events and gave advice to fans who sent emails and Snapchats weekly. They'd also often break out into impromptu freestyles. Haynes also performed poetry slams or improvised vocal visuals. Vongirdner is an aspiring musician going by the name DVG. The two would discuss DVG's musical career along with music in general. They also held several live She Didn't Text Back shows and released the recordings as podcasts. After episode 56, the podcast abruptly stopped uploading and the hosts later went on to say She Didn't Text Back was on an "indefinite hiatus" for personal reasons. However, She Didn't Text Back made a surprise return on August 28, 2017, for a second season with the original hosts and a heavier focus on their lives.

Haynes has worked on several of DVG's music videos, including "Past Due," "Flip A Switch," and "June 5th."

=== Musical career ===
On September 22, 2016, Haynes released his debut mixtape, Tunnel Vision, on SoundCloud, iTunes and Spotify. This was an unexpected project that Haynes had been working on over the summer of that year. On February 21, 2017, Haynes released his second mixtape, The Rise, on iTunes, SoundCloud and Spotify. He also spoke on his podcast and on Twitter about his next musical project being released under a new identity of Arsenio and being of a different style to his previous projects.

=== Political career ===
Haynes was one of 23 candidates running in the 2017 Los Angeles mayoral election against incumbent mayor Eric Garcetti. He decided to run as a reaction to President Donald Trump's win in the 2016 United States presidential election. His platform was based on improving Los Angeles' water supply. Haynes subsequently withdrew his bid on December 9, 2016.

=== Boxing career ===
1 fight	1 win	0 losses
By knockout	1	0

No.	Result	Record	Opponent	Type	Round, time	Date	Location	Notes
1	Win	1-0	Chris Ray Gun	TKO	2 (5)	April 15, 2023	Amalie Arena, Tampa, Florida, U.S.	
