= Janette Rallison =

American writer (born 1966)

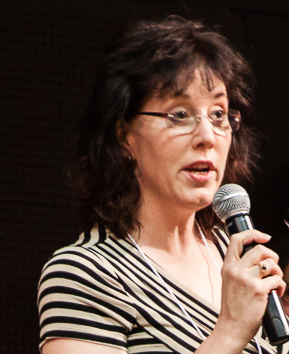
- Rallison in 2015
- Born: April 1, 1966 (age 60); Pullman, Washington, U.S.
- Education: Brigham Young University
- Spouse: Robert Rallison
- Children: 5, including James
- Writing career
- Pen name: C. J. Hill; Sierra St. James
- Website: janetterallison.com

Janette Rallison (born April 1, 1966) is an American writer best known for her light romance novels for young adults. She also writes young adult science fiction and fantasy under the pen name C. J. Hill, and adult romantic novels as Sierra St. James.

== Biography ==
=== Personal life ===
Rallison was born in 1966. She grew up in Pullman, Washington. Growing up in a small town influenced the settings Rallison writes about in her books. She later moved to Chandler, Arizona. She began writing at the age of six years old, and has continued to write throughout her life in the genres of romance and science fiction. She attended college at Brigham Young University where she studied English Teaching. She is married and has five children, including Robert James Rallison, an Internet personality and animator, better known online as TheOdd1sOut.

Rallison is a member of the Church of Jesus Christ of Latter-day Saints.

=== Writing career ===
Rallison published her first novels through LDS publishing companies; however, after submitting one of her books to a national book company, her career took off.

Rallison began her writing career working for an LDS publishing company writing romantic adult novels under the pen name Sierra St. James. She has recently acquired the rights to these books and has been re-editing and republishing them (her Erasing Time series under her pen name C.J. Hill is an example of this). After her books changed genres from romantic comedy to action, Rallison's editor had her use the pen name C.J. Hill. She has written the Slayers trilogy as well as the Erasing Time series under this name.

=== Themes in books ===
Rallison's books are upbeat and uplifting stories that are for pleasure and entertainment. She writes on her website that "If your teacher asks you to identify symbolism in my books, you have my permission to tell him/her that I didn’t put any in." However, she has also stated that the element of forgiveness is very prevalent in her books and would be what she would classify as the overarching theme of her writing.

== Books ==
- Deep Blue Eyes and Other Lies (1996)
- Dakota's Revenge (1998)
- Playing the Field (2002)
- All's Fair in Love, War, and High School (2003)
- Life, Love, and the Pursuit of Free Throws (2004)
- Fame, Glory, and Other Things on My To-Do List (2005)
- It's a Mall World After All (2006)
- How to Take the Ex Out of Ex-Boyfriend (2007)
- Can You Keep a Secret? Ten Stories about Secrets (contributor) (2007)
- Revenge of the Cheerleaders (2002)
- My Fair Godmother (2009)
- Just One Wish (2009)
- My Double Life (2010)
- My Unfair Godmother (2011)
- Blue Eyes and Other Teenage Hazards (2011 revision of Deep Blue Eyes)
- A Longtime (and at one point Illegal) Crush (2013)
- Son of War, Daughter of Chaos (2014)
- My Fairly Dangerous Godmother (2015)
- The Girl Who Heard Demons (2016)
- The Wrong Side of Magic (2016)
- My Fair Lacey (2018)
- How I Met Your Brother (2016)
- The Cowboy and the Girl Next Door (2021)
- An Unexpected Boyfriend for Christmas (2021)
- What the Doctor Ordered rewrite (2022)
- Covert Kisses compilation of three novellas (2022)
- Revenge of the Nerd Goddess rewrite of Dakota's Revenge (2022)
- Her Ex-crush Bodyguard (2023)
- A Longtime (and now NFL player) Nemesis (2023)
- The Wizard's Mark (2024)
- Empowereds (2024)
- A Longtime (and now the boss) Ex-boyfriend (2025)

=== As C. J. Hill ===
- Slayers (2011)
- Friends and Traitors (2013)
- Slayers: Playing with Fire (2016)
- Slayers: The Dragon Lords (2018)
- Slayers: Into the Firestorm (2019)
- Erasing Time (2012)
- Echo in Time (2013)

=== As Sierra St. James ===
- Trial of the Heart (1999)
- Masquerade (2001)
- What the Doctor Ordered (2004)

=== Novellas ===
- Summer in New York (2013)
- A Long Time (and at one point illegal) Crush (2014)
