= Nathan Barnatt =

American actor and comedian (born 1981)

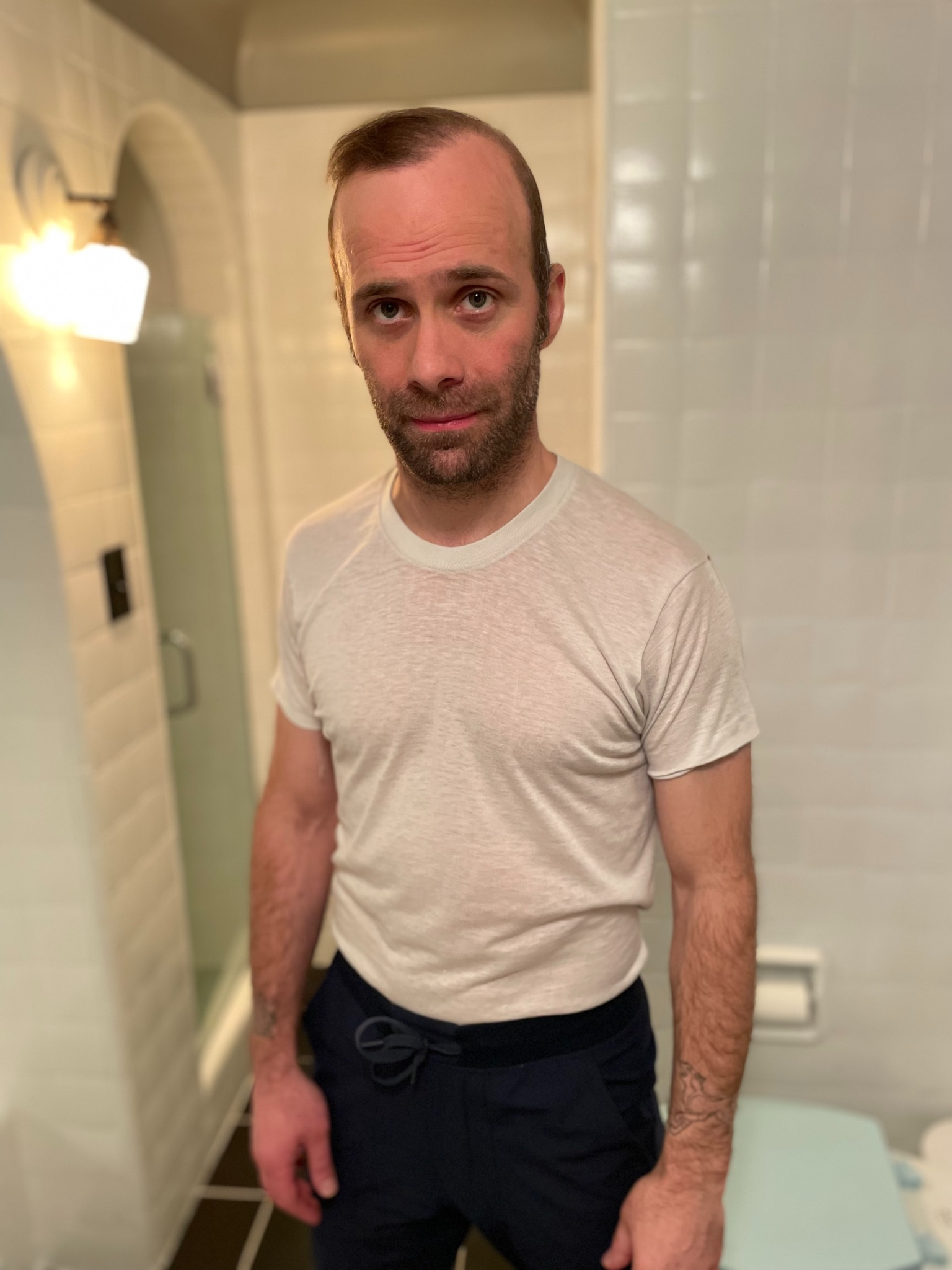
- Barnatt in 2022
- Born: Nathan James Barnatt; February 2, 1981 (age 45); Milford, Massachusetts, U.S.
- Occupations: Actor; comedian; dancer; filmmaker; stuntman; YouTuber

YouTube information
- Channel: Nathan
- Years active: 2006–present
- Genres: Dancing; physical comedy; boxing
- Subscribers: 486 thousand
- Views: 128 million
- Last updated: June 19, 2026
- Website: nathanbarnatt.com

Nathan James Barnatt (born February 2, 1981) is an American actor, comedian, and content creator. He is best known for his famous comical characters Keith Apicary and Dad.

== Early life ==
Nathan Barnatt was born on February 2, 1981 in Milford, Massachusetts, to parents Mary and Tom Barnatt–who were working as a secretary and carpenter respectively. He grew up as the middle child between his younger and older brothers Seth and Joshua–who went on to become a writer and photographer respectively. Barnatt began his filming career during the eight grade, as he spent his youth with his brothers shooting videos with rented equipment and airing them on local cable access across their hometown. He graduated from Medway High School, but dropped out of acting school when realizing he was getting paid more for acting in commercial work rather than learning how to be a professional one. Barnatt worked as a gravedigger for two years in order to pay for bills. His job eventually earned him enough money to move to Los Angeles, California in the summer of 2006, where he found comfort and excitement in his choice of audience as he began uploading comedy sketches to the online video-sharing platform YouTube–which only begun growing in popularity around the time.

== Career ==
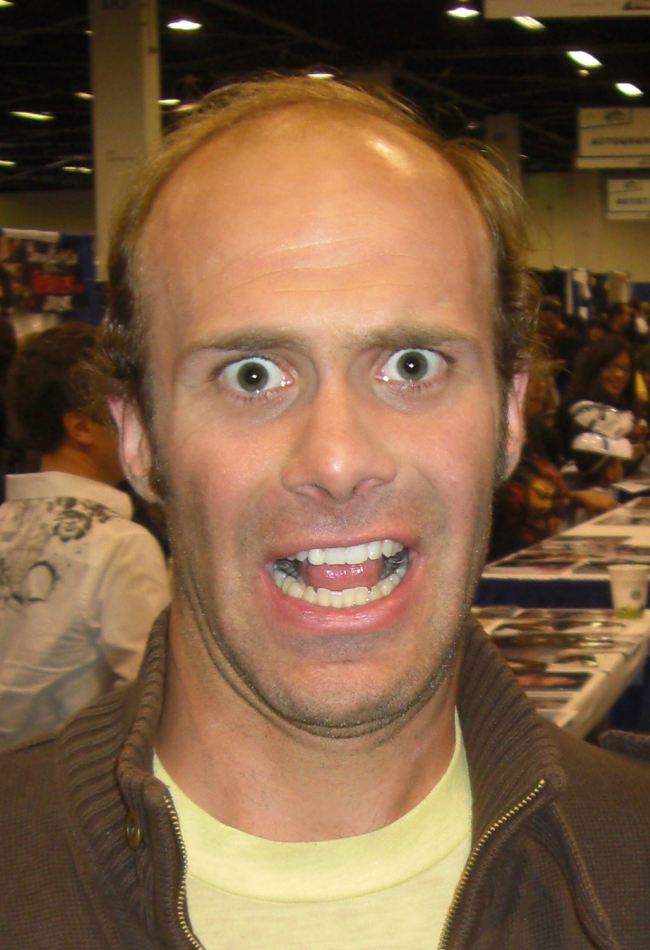
Barnatt at the Anaheim Comic Con in 2010

Barnatt appeared on Comedy Central's The Gong Show with Dave Attell in 2008, on Comedy Central's Ghosts/Aliens pilot in 2009, and on This Show Will Get You High in 2010. In 2012, Barnatt began developing a show with Adult Swim based on his Keith Apicary character called Youth Large. The Youth Large pilot was written by Barnatt, his younger brother Seth, and Paul Cummings (who is also the director). However, Adult Swim passed on the pilot but it was released online in August 2014. Since then, Barnatt has sold shows to television networks Nickelodeon, Amazon, Comedy Central, Fox and Viceland.

Barnatt is a performer at the Upright Citizens Brigade theater in Hollywood California. He is also an amateur dancer, as displayed in his videos including a Kimberly Cole audition session.

His popularity in the Kimberly Cole audition video has led him to appear in the music video for Kimberly Cole's "U Make Me Wanna" in his Keith Apicary character. Barnatt also appeared in character in a music video for "Let It Roll" by Flo Rida and "Paradise" by Laidback Luke. He appears in character in the music video for "Freestyle" by country music group Lady Antebellum.

In 2012, Barnatt was featured on the front cover of LA Weekly magazine, covering his success on YouTube. In 2013, Barnatt provided voice work on the Animation Domination show High School USA! as one of the main characters, Lamort Blackstein.

In 2015, Barnatt played a police officer in the music video for "Sugar" by Robin Schulz.

In June 2016, Barnatt appeared as a guest on the Let's Play webseries Game Grumps. In November 2016, Barnatt appeared in an episode of James & Mike Mondays, alongside James Rolfe, whom he worked with on Rolfe's 2014 film Angry Video Game Nerd: The Movie. On December 20, 2016, he again appeared as his character Keith Apicary in a Christmas episode of the Angry Video Game Nerd episode where he dresses up as Will Ferrell's character from Elf in order to secure Santa's gifts, and he and the Nerd play a variety of games with different Sega Genesis accessories while destroying the set in a slapstick fashion. He also appears in a short film by James Rolfe called "Flying Fuckernauts vs. the Astro Bastards" as one of two Fuckernauts, alongside Rolfe.

In January 2017 appeared in the music video "Summer" by Marshmello with Lele Pons. Playing the role of a manager for a roller rink where Marshmello is an employee in the music video.

In July 2018, Barnatt played a fast-talking salesman in an ad for the game Sonic Mania. In the ad, he is trying to sell a faceless customer a copy of a fictional game called Finger GunZ. However, the customer is repeatedly drawn to the gameplay of Sonic Mania Plus. Deliberately edited to look and sound like a 1990s commercial, the customer talks about all the features of Sonic Mania Plus and its low price while Barnatt repeatedly tries to sell Finger GunZ with comments taking direct jabs at the games industry.

In 2019, Barnatt created a YouTube channel called Dad, featuring the web series Dad Feels following a character named Dad. Though it is often called an alternate reality game (ARG), Barnatt disowns the term. The series concluded its first season consisting of three acts in December 2020. The series was a surprising success for Barnatt, who was experiencing financial struggles severe enough that he prepared to live in his van.

In August 2019, Barnatt appeared as a guest on an episode of Rental Reviews in which they reviewed the 1971 film Duel, and appeared again in September 2019, this time reviewing the 1982 film First Blood both as himself and Keith Apicary.

In June 2021, Barnatt appeared on season 16 of America's Got Talent as his character Keith Apicary where he received four "yes" votes from the judges for his dance routine. On the semi-final live show broadcast August 25, 2021, Apicary did not make it through to the next round.

In May 2022 and April 2023, Barnatt participated in the Creator Clash boxing events as his "Dad" character. In the 2022 event, he won his match against Matt Watson by TKO in 22 seconds. At the 2023 event, he defeated Starkilla after Starkilla forfeited between the first and second rounds. In his winning speech, Barnatt called out WWE and stated he still has the paperwork provided by them.

In March 2025, his "Dad" character made an appearance on an episode of Make Some Noise featured on Dropout.

In June 2026, Barnett participated in his third boxing match as his "Dad" character. The event was held in Germany as part of the Fame Fighting vs. Misfits Boxing event, with Barnatt representing Misfits against Turkish mixed martial artist Ediz Tasci, who represented Fame. During the match, Barnett forfeited the match in the first round after Tasci hit with some direct punches to the face. Later that year, Barnett returned to the ring and faced Cherdleys on the undercard of Henry Cejudo vs. Javon Walton. The bout took place on September 26 at the James L. Knight Center in Miami, Florida in which Barnatt defeated Cherdleys via technical knockout in the second round.

== Filmography ==
Television
Year	Title	Role	Notes
2010	Scream Queens	Nerdy Stripper / Mime	2 episodes
2011	Happy Endings	Roger	Episode: "Mein Coming Out"
2011	Auction Hunters	Ms. Pac-Man expert	Episode: "Labor of Love"
2011	Community	Basketball player	Episode: "Documentary Filmmaking: Redux"
2012	Animation Domination High-Def	Keith Apicary	Episode: "Obama Fire Sale" (voice)
2013	Axe Cop	Keith Apicary	Episode: "Ask Axe Cop: President" (voice)
2013	Youth Large	Keith Apicary	Pilot (Note: Also co-creator, executive producer and writer)
2013–2015	High School USA!	Lamort Blackstein	Main cast (voice)
2014–2017	Kirby Buckets	Gil	Recurring
2015	Documentary Now!	Sign Spinner	Episode: "The Eye Doesn't Lie"
2016	Party Over Here	Various	Episode: "Suffragettes"
2016	Time Traveling Bong	Clyde	Episode: "Chapter 2: The Middle"
2016	Swedish Dicks	Bob	Episode: "Episode 4"
2016–2019	Adam Ruins Everything	Various	5 episodes
2017	Making History	Cameraman	Episode: "The Godfriender"
2017	Lucifer	Buster	Episode: "My Brother's Keeper"
2018	It's Always Sunny in Philadelphia	Boss	Episode: "Time's Up for the Gang"
2018	New Warriors	Tased Man	TV Pilot
2019	Now Apocalypse	Worm	3 episodes
2019	Just Roll With It	Bonesy	2 episodes
2020	Stumptown	Randy Huffernan	Episode: "At All Costs: The Conrad Costas Chronicles"
2021	America's Got Talent	Himself (Keith Apicary)	Contestant
2025	Make Some Noise	Dad	Episode: "A Takedown of Billionaires Rihanna, Beyoncé, and Oprah"

Short film
Year	Title	Role	Notes
2018 (Note: Neutral officially premiered at several film festivals and on Barnatt's official YouTube channel in the summer of 2018.)	Neutral	Tom Weaver	Also director, writer, editor and co-producer.
2021 (Note: Milford was initially shown to backers who helped fund the film in March 2019, while it later premiered at film festivals in the second half of 2020.)	Milford	Jace	Also director, writer, and editor.

Internet
Year	Title	Role	Notes
2016	Angry Video Game Nerd	Keith Apicary	Episode: "Sega Activator Interactor Menacer"
2019	Dad	Dad	Also creator, director

Music videos
Year	Title	Role	Notes
2011	"Que Veux-tu (Madeon Remix)"	Himself	Yelle
2011	"Pop Culture"	Himself	Madeon
2012	"U Make Me Wanna"	Keith Apicary	Kimberly Cole
2012	"Let It Roll (Keith Apicary video)"	Keith Apicary	Flo Rida
2014	"Freestyle"	Keith Apicary	Lady A
2015	"Sugar"	Officer Finkleman	Robin Schulz ft. Francesco Yates
2016	"Ici & Maintenant"	—N/a	Yelle
2017	"Summer"	Barista	Marshmello
2017	"Paradise"	Keith Apicary	Laidback Luke
2021	"Bedroom Eyes"	Dad	The Knocks ft. Studio Killers
2023	"Voices"	Extra	KSI ft. Oliver Tree
2024	"Dance 'Til You Stop"	Interrupting Guy	Ninja Sex Party ft. Tom Cardy

== Discography ==
=== Studio albums ===
Title	Character	Year
Talking Classics Compact Disc on the Internet	Keith Apicary	2011
Music	Dad	2019
More Music	Dad	2021
The Most Annoying Songs Alive	Murt Ambroseo	2024

=== Singles ===
Title	Character	Year	Album
"Most Annoying Song Ever"	Murt Ambroseo	2009	Non-album single
"Neo Geo" (Retro 2600 Remix) (Featuring FantomenK)	Keith Apicary	2010	Talking Classics Compact Disc on the Internet
"Classic Gaming Wiz" (Blue Hedgehog Remix)	Keith Apicary	2010	Talking Classics Compact Disc on the Internet
"Sonic the Hedgesong"	Keith Apicary	2010	Talking Classics Compact Disc on the Internet
"Virtual Boy Song" (Featuring FantomenK)	Keith Apicary	2011	Talking Classics Compact Disc on the Internet
"Skittles Song" (Featuring Graham Mackie)	Trale Lewous	2011	Non-album single
"Brental-Loss" (Featuring FantomenK and Brentalfloss)	Keith Apicary	2011	Talking Classics Compact Disc on the Internet
"Dreamcast 2 Song" (Chemical Plant Zone Remix)	Keith Apicary	2011	Talking Classics Compact Disc on the Internet
"T.M.N.T.S.O.N.G." (Featuring FantomenK)	Keith Apicary	2012	Talking Classics Compact Disc on the Internet
"Oh Girl"	Roy Mance	2012	Non-album singles
"Keith of Rage"	Keith Apicary	2013	Non-album singles
"Koopa Bounce"	Keith Apicary	2014	Talking Classics Compact Disc on the Internet
"Can't Go Home" (featuring Andrew W.K., Mick Foley, and Shadrew)	Keith Apicary	2015	Non-album singles
"Keith Apicary vs. the Social Outcasts"	Keith Apicary	2016	Non-album singles
"Say Gah" (featuring FantomenK)	Keith Apicary	2018	Non-album singles
"Sinkin in Lincoln"		2018	Non-album singles
"Dad Feels Great"	Dad	2018	Non-album singles
"Most Hated Song Ever"		2019	Non-album singles
"Dad Feels Good" (Boosted Mix) (featuring Danny Brown and Jankins)	Dad	2019	Non-album singles
"Summer" (featuring Ironmouse and Duzzled)	Dad	2021	Non-album singles
"Matt Watson Diss-appointment Track" (featuring Matt's friends)		2022	Non-album singles
"Obliterate" (featuring Corey Graves and MatPat)		2022	Non-album singles

== Boxing record ==
4 fights	3 wins	1 loss
By knockout	3	1

No.	Result	Record	Opponent	Type	Round, time	Date	Location	Notes
3	Win	3–1	Cherdleys	TKO	2 (3), 1:19	Sep 26, 2026	James L. Knight Center, Miami, Florida, U.S.	
3	Loss	2–1	Ediz Tasci	TKO	1 (4), 2:20	Jun 6, 2026	Ostermann-Arena, Leverkusen, Germany	
2	Win	2–0	Starkilla	TKO	1 (5), 2:00	April 15, 2023	Amalie Arena, Tampa, Florida, U.S.	
1	Win	1–0	Matt Watson	TKO	1 (5), 0:22	May 14, 2022	Yuengling Center, Tampa, Florida, U.S.	

== See also ==
- Talking Classics
