= TheOdd1sOut =

American YouTuber (born 1996)

- Rallison in 2026
- Born: Robert James Rallison; May 14, 1996 (age 30); Chandler, Arizona, U.S.
- Occupations: YouTuber; cartoonist; animator; author; voice actor
- Mother: Janette Rallison

YouTube information
- Channel: TheOdd1sOut
- Years active: 2014–present
- Subscribers: 20.9 million
- Views: 5.94 billion
- Rallison's voice Rallison in a YouTube video in 2019
- Last updated: November 16, 2026
- Website: theodd1sout.com

Robert James Rallison (born May 14, 1996), known online as TheOdd1sOut, is an American YouTuber, cartoonist, animator, author, and voice actor. He is best known for producing story-time animations on his YouTube channel, which, as of November 2026, has 20.9 million subscribers and 5.94 billion views. He is also the co-creator and executive producer of the Netflix animated series Oddballs (2022–2023), on which he voiced the main character James.

== Early and personal life ==
Robert James Rallison was born in Chandler, Arizona, on May 14, 1996, to a Mormon family. His mother is author Janette Rallison. Rallison is no longer Mormon and never had a desire to go on a mission. He has a twin sister, Faith, and three other siblings: Luke, Kate, and Arianna.

He attended Perry High School in Gilbert, Arizona. In 2018, Rallison moved to Glendale, California.

== Career ==
=== Webcomics ===
Rallison's first published illustrated works were webcomics, under the title TheOdd1sOut. He uploaded the first comic strip onto Tumblr in June 2012, when he was 16. After 100 comics, he had amassed 100 followers, and it took him about a year to settle into his art style. By September 2016 he had written around 400 strips. Rallison described the characters in his comics as "marshmallow people" because of their white, roundish look. His comics tended to focus on lighthearted themes, such as taking famous puns literally, or poking fun at social clichés.

=== YouTube ===
On August 30, 2014, just over two years after starting his webcomic, Rallison started his YouTube channel as theodd1sout comic. In his animated videos, which feature the same "marshmallow people" as the webcomic, he talks about his life story, his thoughts, and opinions. His first video was titled "A Book I Made as a Kid", looking at a short story he made while in elementary school. In March 2016, his channel reached 100,000 subscribers. In April 2016, his channel gained over 278,000 subscribers, giving him a total of over 400,000 subscribers. In July 2016, his channel reached 1 million subscribers. At some point, Rallison dropped out of college to make videos full-time.

On December 2, 2017, Rallison created a second channel, TheOdd2sOut, in which non-animation content is uploaded, i.e. gaming. TheOdd2sOut amassed 1 million subscribers in April 2018, and TheOdd1sOut reached 10 million subscribers in January 2019.

In early 2026, Rallison downsized his animation team, citing reduced output and work available for the team. While this initially prompted backlash from fans who were under the impression that Rallison fired the entire team without notice, Rallison clarified that he still has an animation team and that all of the animators that were let go were informed in advance and those affected who were working full time were given severance packages.

==== Collaborations ====
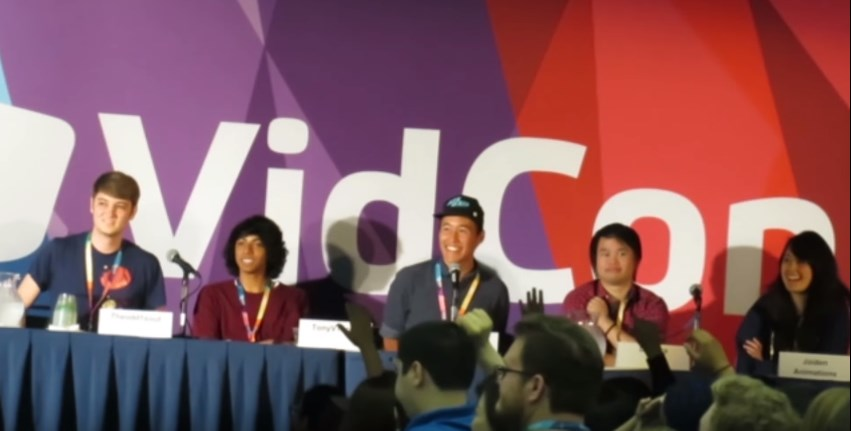
Rallison (left) with various other animation YouTubers, including Domics (2nd from right) and Jaiden Animations (right)

Rallison has collaborated with others to produce two songs and their accompanying music videos: "Life is Fun" in July 2018 with David "Boyinaband" Brown; and "Good Person" in December 2020 with Joel "Roomie" Berghult.

His animated character appeared in the credits scene of YouTube Rewind: The Shape of 2017 and in YouTube Rewind 2018: Everyone Controls Rewind where he has a speaking role. In March 2019, Rallison was in MrBeast's $200,000 YouTuber Battle Royale video. He was on a team with Jaiden Animations and Anthony Padilla and they won the first round. Rallison gave the earnings he made from the YouTuber Battle Royale to Team Trees, a non-profit started by MrBeast that aimed to plant 20 million trees by the end of 2019.

=== Other work ===
Rallison wrote a book titled The Odd 1s Out: How to Be Cool and Other Things I Definitely Learned from Growing Up, which was released in July 2018. It was ranked No. 12 in the "trade paperback" category on Publishers Weekly's August 13, 2018, bestseller list.

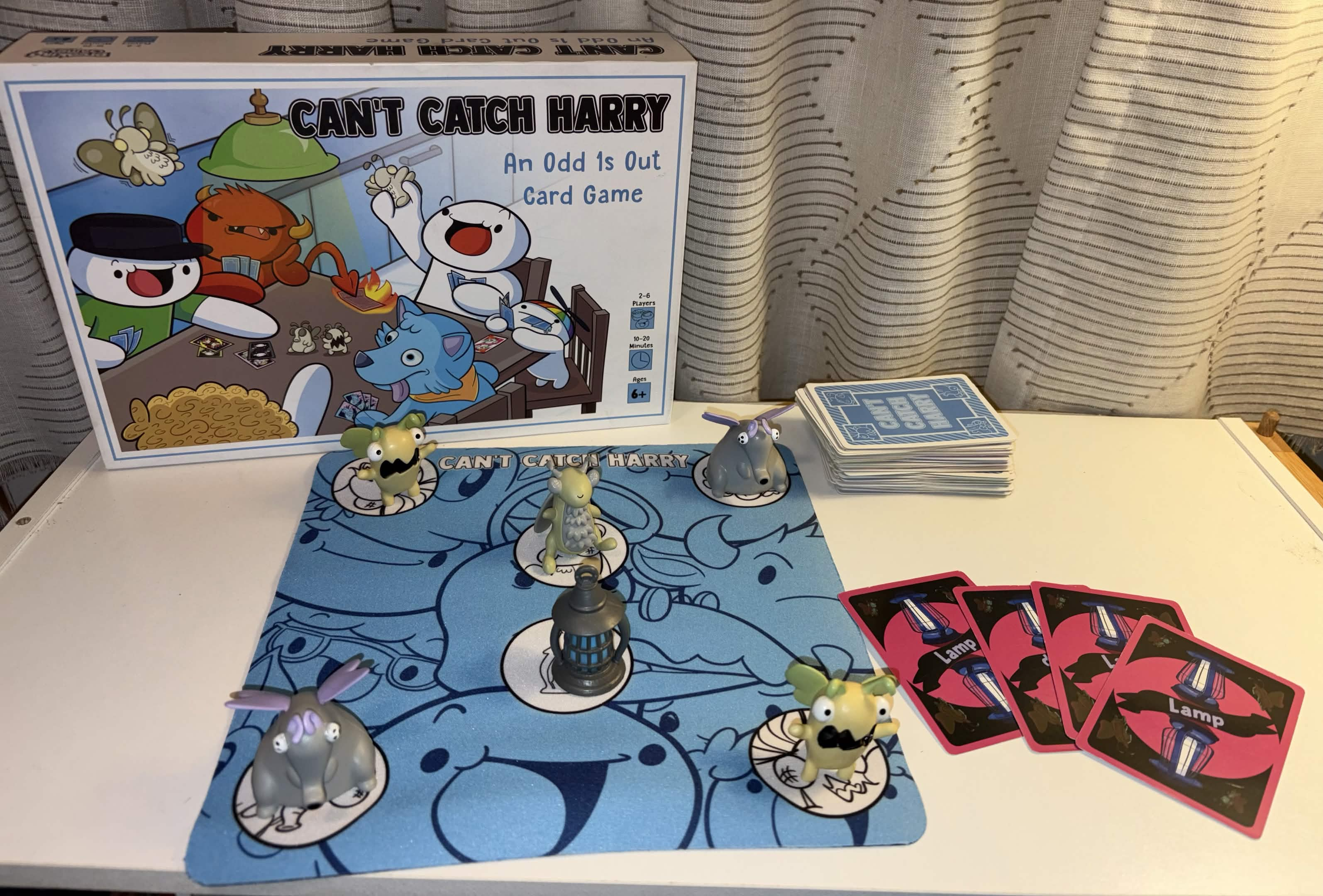
The Can't Catch Harry board game

Rallison also worked on board games Can't Catch Harry and Cafe Chaos, and, on November 22, Rallison announced and released his mobile game named TheOdd1sOut: Let's Bounce!.

In June 2022, Rallison announced that an animated series, Oddballs, based on his character, would premiere on Netflix later in the year.

== Public image ==
As of December 2022, Rallison's main YouTube channel had over 19.5 million subscribers, and his secondary channel had over 2.7 million subscribers.

Foodbeast writer Peter Pham called Rallison's three videos about working at Subway (which Rallison satirically refers to as "Sooubway") "amazing" and "hilarious".

In 2017, Dave Trumbore of Collider named Rallison one of five YouTubers who were "poised for mainstream success". In 2018, Kristin Brantley of Culturess reviewed his channel and webcomics favorably, writing, "You'll be glued to the screen watching all of these hilarious clips and reading all his great comics."

=== Awards and nominations ===
Year	Organization	Award	Recipient	Result	Ref.
2016	Streamy Awards	Animated	Himself	Nominated	

== Boxing record ==
1 fight	0 wins	1 loss
By knockout	0	1

No.	Result	Record	Opponent	Type	Round, time	Date	Location	Notes
1	Loss	0–1	I Did a Thing	TKO	1 (5), 1:24	May 14, 2022	Yuengling Center, Tampa, Florida, US	

== Books ==
- TheOdd1sOut: How to Be Cool and Other Things I Definitely Learned from Growing Up (July 2018)
- TheOdd1sOut: The First Sequel (March 2020)
- TheOdd1sOut Doodle Book (March 2022)
- The Odd 1s Out Journal (October 2022)
- Oddballs: The Graphic Novel (April 2023)
- TheOdd1sOut Art and Comics Collection (July 2026)

== Discography ==
- "Life is Fun" (with Boyinaband) (2018)
- "Good Person" (featuring Roomie) (2020)

== Filmography ==
Year	Title	Role	Notes
2017	YouTube Rewind: The Shape of 2017	—N/a	Short film; animator
2018	YouTube Rewind 2018: Everyone Controls Rewind	Himself	Short film; voice; also animator
2018	How It Should Have Ended	Martha	Web series; voice; episode: "The Martha Origin Story" (no. 138)
2018	asdfmovie11	Judge	Short film; voice
2018	asdfmovie11	Psychologist	Short film; voice
2018–2019; 2022	YouTubers React	Himself	Web series; 28 episodes
2019	Meta Runner	Male civilian	Web series; voice; episode: "Wrong Warp" (no. 1)
2019	Meta Runner	Himself	Web series; voice; episode: "Fast Food Fight" (special episode)
2022–2023	Oddballs	James	TV series; voice; also creator, executive producer; 20 episodes
