= PewDiePie videography =

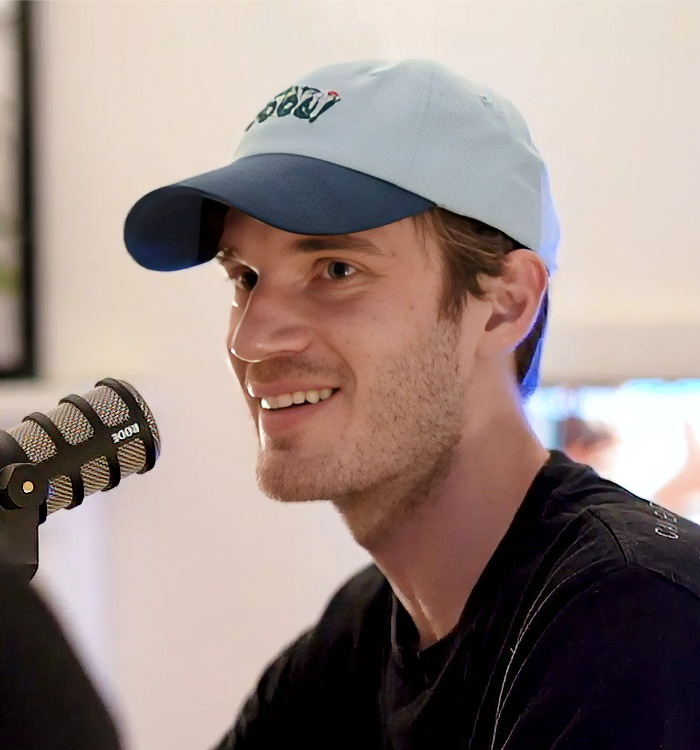
PewDiePie in July 2019

Swedish YouTuber Felix Kjellberg, known online as PewDiePie, has uploaded over 4,600 videos on the YouTube platform. (Note: This count is accurate as of 22 April 2023, and does not include videos which have been removed from YouTube.) Having accumulated over 29.5 billion video views as of July 2026, PewDiePie's channel ranks within the 100 most viewed on YouTube. (Note: Channel video views count and ranking accurate as of July 2026.) Due to PewDiePie's YouTube channel having been the most-subscribed on the platform from 2013 through 2019, and it still remaining one of the most since, his channel's videos have attracted substantial media coverage.

According to Social Blade–a website which tracks YouTube channel statistics–on 29 December 2014, the PewDiePie channel surpassed emimusic's video view count, at over 7.2 billion views, to become the most-viewed channel on the website. PewDiePie's channel has reached various video view milestones; one which received considerable media coverage was it becoming the first to reach 10 billion views on 6 September 2015. PewDiePie's channel held the distinction of being the most-viewed on the platform until 14 February 2017, when it was surpassed by T-Series, according to Social Blade.

PewDiePie's first video on the eponymous channel was deleted and is no longer available for public viewing; in a 2017 interview conducted by one of his friends, PewDiePie expressed he no longer has access to the video. The oldest PewDiePie video available for public viewing on YouTube is "Minecraft Multiplayer Fun", published on 2 October 2010. As of August 2026, the video has accumulated over 22 million video views. The most-viewed video uploaded by PewDiePie is the music video "bitch lasagna", published on 5 October 2018. As of August 2026, the video has accumulated over 328 million views.

== Most-viewed videos ==
=== All-time list ===
Top 10 most-viewed PewDiePie videos on YouTube
#	Video name	Views (millions)	Upload date	Video	Notes
1.	"bitch lasagna"	328.9	5 October 2018		(Note: "bitch lasagna" is a diss track-styled music video aimed at T-Series. The track was made in collaboration with producer Party in Backyard.)
2.	"Congratulations"	242.2	31 March 2019		(Note: This is a music video directing a congratulatory gesture toward T-Series, but in a mocking tone, as it was uploaded in the context of T-Series surpassing PewDiePie in subscriber count. PewDiePie is also featured discussing controversial incidents involving T-Series. The video was made in collaboration with Roomie and Boyinaband.)
3.	"LEVEL 7 | I'M NOT CRAZY (OUTLAST IRL GAMEPLAY)"	134.3	10 February 2016		(Note: Based on the 2013 video game Outlast, "LEVEL 7 | I'M NOT CRAZY (OUTLAST IRL GAMEPLAY)" is the seventh episode from the first season of Scare PewDiePie. Scare PewDiePie was a YouTube Red (now renamed YouTube Premium) series and only this episode was made available as a free episode, whereas the other episodes require a subscription to YouTube Premium.)
4.	"A Funny Montage"	95.4	4 June 2013		(Note: "A Funny Montage" is a compilation of moments from PewDiePie's Let's Play-styled content.)
5.	"THE RUBY PLAYBUTTON / YouTube 50 Mil Sub Reward Unbox"	91.7	18 December 2016		(Note: In commemoration of his channel reaching 50 million subscribers, YouTube sent PewDiePie a customized Ruby Play Button award; PewDiePie features himself unboxing the award in this video.)
6.	"YouTube Rewind 2018 but it's actually good"	89.2	27 December 2018		(Note: In collaboration with several other content creators, PewDiePie uploaded a YouTube Rewind-styled mashup video in response to YouTube Rewind 2018: Everyone Controls Rewind and the mostly negative reception that video received.)
7.	"FUNNY MONTAGE.. #2"	74.5	5 April 2014		(Note: "FUNNY MONTAGE.. #2" is another compilation of PewDiePie's gaming content; the video includes clips featuring South Park: The Stick of Truth, Dark Souls II, and Goat Simulator.)
8.	"Jabba the Hutt (PewDiePie Song) by Schmoyoho"	74.2	14 September 2013		(Note: "Jabba the Hutt (PewDiePie Song) by Schmoyoho" is a music video created by Schmoyoho (also known as The Gregory Brothers), using inside jokes and footage from PewDiePie's previous vlog content.)
9.	"Unboxing 100 MIL YouTube AWARD!!"	72.4	10 September 2019		(Note: PewDiePie reviews his past content, dating from "Minecraft Multiplayer Fun" through his 100 million subscriber milestone. He additionally unboxes the Red Diamond Creator Award, given to him by YouTube for reaching the milestone. He also announced a $50,000 donation to the Anti-Defamation League, which he later rescinded.)
10.	"Minecraft Part 1"	60.4	21 June 2019		(Note: The first video in Kjellberg's Let's Play-styled series of Minecraft. The video was notable for being Kjellberg's first Minecraft video in years and helping propel the game's resurgence on YouTube.)
Video view counts sourced from YouTube; accurate as of 15 November 2026.

== Selected videography ==
Key
⌀	Denotes videos that have now been made private on YouTube.
†	Denotes videos that have now been removed from YouTube.

=== 2010–14 ===
PewDiePie videos on YouTube (listed by upload date)
Video name	Upload date	Description / notes	Video	Ref.
2010
"Minecraft Multiplayer Fun"	2 October 2010	PewDiePie commentates over Minecraft gameplay.		
"Call of Duty: Black Ops: Team Deathmatch 48-4 Launch (Commentary/Gameplay)"	28 November 2010 (Note: The video was originally uploaded on 28 November 2010, as seen at the 1:07 mark of the 2020 video "I Hit 10 Years Of YouTube Uploads!", but was accidentally published on 2 May 2020, after being set to private for a prior period of time.)	PewDiePie commentates over Call of Duty: Black Ops gameplay.		
"Amnesia: Playthrough Part: 2 - Kill an old dude"	28 December 2010	PewDiePie commentates over Amnesia: The Dark Descent gameplay; this is the second part of a full playthrough of the game.		
2011
"Bulletstorm Highlights"	28 February 2011	PewDiePie commentates over Bulletstorm gameplay. Noted for being PewDiePie's least-viewed video.		
"Amnesia Top 10 Scary Moments (and funny) CustomMod: Abduction"	4 September 2011	A compilation of PewDiePie's Lets Play videos featuring gameplay of Amnesia: The Dark Descent and its Abduction mod.		
"IT'S R*PING TIME (Official Music Video) Ao Oni" †	27 November 2011	A music video featuring clips of PewDiePie's Ao Oni gameplay.		
2012
"Happy Wheels - Part 1 - PewDiePie Lets Play"	1 February 2012	PewDiePie commentates over Happy Wheels gameplay.		
"[FUNNY] TOP SCARIEST MOMENTS OF GAMING! (with screams) episode 7"	25 February 2012	A compilation of PewDiePie's Let's Play videos featuring gameplay of Amnesia: The Dark Descent and Cry of Fear.		
" TO NARNIA! - Happy Wheels - Part 53" ⌀	13 July 2012	PewDiePie commentates over Happy Wheels gameplay.		
"FUNNY GAMING MONTAGE!"	28 October 2012	A compilation of PewDiePie's Lets Play videos featuring gameplay from more than twenty of his previous gaming sessions.		
2013
"OUTRAGEOUS ENDING! - Mad Father (6)" ⌀	26 January 2013	PewDiePie commentates over Mad Father gameplay.		
"FUNNY GAMING MONTAGE!"	3 February 2013	A montage of humorous moments from PewDiePie's Let's Plays.		
"VLOG - Singapore - BROS ARE EVERYWHERE!"	29 May 2013	A travel vlog featuring PewDiePie in Singapore for the Starcount Social Star Awards.		
"A Funny Montage"	4 June 2013	A compilation of PewDiePie's Lets Play videos featuring gameplay of fan-made Super Mario games and Surgeon Simulator, among other games.		
"The Last Of Us ENDING! - Final - Part 16"	28 June 2013	PewDiePie commentates over The Last of Us gameplay.		
"Deadpool Gameplay - Part 1 - Walkthrough Playthrough Let's Play | PewDiePie"	5 July 2013	PewDiePie commentates over Deadpool gameplay.		
"10 MILLION BROS UNITE! - Charity: Water"	12 July 2013	In commemoration of reaching 10 million subscribers, PewDiePie encourages his viewers to donate to Charity: Water.		
"THINGS YOU DIDN'T KNOW ABOUT ME. - (Fridays With PewDiePie - Part 61)"	9 August 2013	PewDiePie participates in a YouTube trend, where he shares 25 facts about himself, with five being not true. This video is the 61st episode in PewDiePie's Fridays with PewDiePie series.		
"TIME TO PARTY! - (Fridays With PewDiePie - Part 62)"	16 August 2013	PewDiePie thanks his viewers for helping his channel become the most-subscribed on YouTube, featuring a humorous skit with Smosh. This video is the 62nd episode in PewDiePie's Fridays with PewDiePie series.		
"Jabba the Hutt (PewDiePie Song) by Schmoyoho"	14 September 2013	A music video created by Schmoyoho (also known as The Gregory Brothers), pairing auto-tuned voice clips with video footage from PewDiePie's content.		
"WALL TWERK - (Fridays With PewDiePie - Part 65)"	20 September 2013	PewDiePie announces the winners of the shoutout contest, where he recommends 10 smaller channels of various genres, including a mention of future collaborator and friend Jacksepticeye. This video is the 65th episode in PewDiePie's Fridays with PewDiePie series.		
"WORLDS MOST OFFENSIVE GAME? - (Fridays With PewDiePie - Part 73)"	23 November 2013	PewDiePie and his then-girlfriend Marzia Bisognin play Cards Against Humanity. This video is the 73rd episode in PewDiePie's Fridays with PewDiePie series.		
"BADASS CLEMENTINE! - The Walking Dead: Season 2 - Part 3 - Gameplay / Walkthrough"	18 December 2013	PewDiePie commentates over The Walking Dead: Season Two gameplay.		
2014
"FLAPPY BIRD - DONT PLAY THIS GAME!"	27 January 2014	PewDiePie commentates over Dumb Ways to Die and Flappy Bird gameplay.		
"TAKE YOUR PANTS OFF! (Update Vlog)"	3 March 2014	PewDiePie announces he would be scaling down the rate of his video production and upload output.		
"Save the Children - 25 Million Bros!"	21 March 2014	In commemoration of reaching 25 million subscribers, PewDiePie encourages his viewers to donate to Save the Children.		
"FUNNY MONTAGE.. #2"	5 April 2014	Another entry in PewDiePie's series of compilations of his previous Let's Plays.		
"FUNNY MONTAGE (bonus)"	12 April 2014	A compilation of PewDiePie's Lets Play videos.		
"REAL LIFE HORROR! - As Above So Below: Catacombs Challenge"	11 June 2014	To promote the film As Above, So Below, PewDiePie asks his fans to vote on the scares that will be present in an underground horror scenario.		
"As Above, So Below: CATACOMBS CHALLENGE - Episode 2 (2)"	17 August 2014	To promote the film As Above, So Below, PewDiePie participates in an eponymous challenge that had him traverse the Catacombs of Paris.		
"Soccer Physics - Multiplayer"	21 August 2014	PewDiePie commentates over Soccer Physics gameplay and is joined by his then-girlfriend Marzia Bisognin.		
"GOOD ENDING - Infamous: Second Son - Gameplay - Part 11"	21 August 2014	PewDiePie commentates over Infamous: Second Son gameplay.		
"Barbie Virtual Makeover - GOTY EDITION!"	24 August 2014	PewDiePie commentates over Barbie Virtual Makeup gameplay.		
"When Horror Games Are Too Scary!"	27 August 2014	PewDiePie commentates over Dark Dreams – Episode 1: The Woods gameplay.		
"Goodbye Comments."	29 August 2014	PewDiePie speaks on his channel reaching 30 million subscribers and the Ice Bucket Challenge, and announces that he would be disabling the ability for viewers to comment on his videos.		
"The Walking Dead: Season 2 - All Endings - ALL OUT OF TEARS.."	30 August 2014	PewDiePie commentates over The Walking Dead: Season Two gameplay.		
"THE HOTTEST ALIEN! - Alien Isolation - Gameplay Walkthrough - Part 7"	13 October 2014	PewDiePie commentates over Alien: Isolation gameplay. The video was noted for PewDiePie reverting his decision to disable comments, as he set them to "approved".		
"FUNNY MONTAGE #3"	25 October 2014	A compilation of PewDiePie's Let's Play videos.		
"31,970,288 Subscribers!!!!"	5 November 2014	PewDiePie expresses his appreciation of his viewers and mentions how disabling comments made him feel happier.		
"FIVE NIGHTS AT FREDDY'S 2 - Walkthrough / Playthrough / Gameplay - (NIGHT 1)"	11 November 2014	PewDiePie commentates over Five Nights at Freddy's 2 gameplay.		
"Far Cry 4 IS TERRIFYING!" ⌀	29 November 2014	PewDiePie commentates over Far Cry 4 gameplay.		
"MY FAVORITE SHREK GAME!. // Shrek: Extra Large"	12 December 2014	PewDiePie commentates over Shrek Extra Large gameplay.		

=== 2015–19 ===
PewDiePie videos on YouTube (listed by upload date)
Video name	Upload date	Description / notes	Video	Ref.
2015
"FUNNY MONTAGE #4"	14 February 2015	This video is a compilation of PewDiePie's gaming content.		
"THE PEWDIEPIE GAME!"	12 April 2015	PewDiePie talks about PewDiePie: Legend of the Brofist, which was released later in 2015.		
"Things I Wish I Knew... - (Fridays With PewDiePie - Part 99)"	1 May 2015	PewDiePie shares advice he would have given himself during his teenage years. This video is the 99th episode in PewDiePie's Fridays with PewDiePie series.		
"TRIPPIEST GAME EVER?"	6 June 2015	PewDiePie commentates over Wrassling, Infinideer, and Circa Infinity gameplay.		
"Lets Talk About Money."	7 July 2015	PewDiePie speaks on media reports about his 2014 earnings.		
"I BECAME A ZOMBIE"	28 August 2015	Sponsored by Scopely, PewDiePie commentates over The Walking Dead: Road to Survival gameplay.		
"10 BILLION MONTAGE!"	20 September 2015	A montage of PewDiePie's videos, in commemoration of his channel reaching 10 billion views.		
"IT'S JUST A PRANK BRO - YouTube Highschool"	25 October 2015	PewDiePie voices the action of digital cutouts of popular YouTubers on stock photo backgrounds.		
2016
"CATERING TO YOUR AUDIENCE" ⌀	1 February 2016	In a vlog, PewDiePie expresses feelings related to his content and his audience.		
"LEVEL 7 | I'M NOT CRAZY (OUTLAST IRL GAMEPLAY)"	10 February 2016	PewDiePie encounters situations and sets inspired by the video game Outlast. This video is the 7th episode of the YouTube Red series Scare PewDiePie.		
"OLD VS. NEW PEWDIEPIE! (Fridays With PewDiePie - Part 111)"	24 April 2016	PewDiePie views his older videos and compares them to his newer video style. This video is the 111th episode of PewDiePie's Fridays with PewDiePie series.		
"I'M LOSING SUBS!!!!"	29 June 2016	PewDiePie discusses YouTube's platform-wide subscriber purge.		
"I NEED MY FANS! (Charity)"	12 July 2016	PewDiePie encourages his viewers to support the non-profit organization Crisis Text Line.		
"I Went On Holiday..."	28 August 2016	A travel vlog featuring PewDiePie and his girlfriend Marzia Bisognin on holiday in Kuala Lumpur for their anniversary.		
"WHY I GOT UNVERIFIED"	31 August 2016	PewDiePie discusses his Twitter account being unverified.		
"I QUIT (for now) [END]"	15 November 2016	PewDiePie speaks about being stressed out by producing videos at a high rate.		
"DELETING MY CHANNEL AT 50 MILLION."	2 December 2016	PewDiePie speaks about changes in YouTube's algorithms affecting users' recommended and suggested video feeds. He additionally states that he will delete his channel once it reaches 50 million subscribers.		
"**wtf is going on with Youtube**"	4 December 2016	PewDiePie again speaks about changes in YouTube's algorithms affecting users' recommended and suggested video feeds.		
"CRINGEMAS CHARITY LIVESTREAM - Pewdiepie/Markiplier/Jacksepticeye/KickthePJ and Emmablackery!"	9 December 2016	PewDiePie–joined by fellow YouTubers Markiplier, Jacksepticeye, KickThePJ, and Emma Blackery–hold a live stream with the purpose to raise money for (RED), an HIV/AIDS–related charity.		
"Can this video hit 1 million likes?"	10 December 2016	PewDiePie asks his viewers to like the video.		
"THE RUBY PLAYBUTTON / YouTube 50 Mil Sub Reward Unbox"	18 December 2016	PewDiePie unboxes a customized Ruby Play Button award sent to him by YouTube in commemoration of his channel reaching 50 million subscribers.		
"Can this video get 1 million dislikes?"	24 December 2016	PewDiePie asks his viewers to dislike the video.		
2017
"THE 5 YEAR OLD THAT WILL SURPASS PEWDIEPIE"	3 January 2017	PewDiePie discusses the growing popularity of five-year-old YouTuber Ryan Kaji and criticizes media coverage of his YouTube channel.		
"Forced Positivity on YouTube"	6 January 2017	PewDiePie discusses topics including his happiness, the portrayal of happiness by YouTube vloggers, and burnout related to content creation.		
"STARTED A FIRE IN THE BUILDING! (Experiment Gone Wrong)"	10 January 2017	PewDiePie is seen slicing open a Furby with a hot knife before they incinerated the toy with small blowtorches.		
"I've Discovered The Greatest Thing Online..." †	11 January 2017	PewDiePie uses the Fiverr website. This video attracted controversy and heavily negative reception from media outlets.		
"Can this video get 1 million comments?"	28 January 2017	PewDiePie asks his viewers to comment on the video.		
"My Response" †	16 February 2017	PewDiePie apologizes for offensive jokes and addresses allegations of anti-Semitic views in his content.		
"JAKE PAUL"	6 June 2017	PewDiePie reacts to Jake Paul's "It's Everyday Bro" song and accompanying music video, which references PewDiePie.		
"My Response"	12 September 2017	PewDiePie apologizes for using a racial slur during a stream.		
"Why I'm not in YouTube Rewind 2017"	9 December 2017	PewDiePie responds to being excluded from YouTube Rewind 2017.		
2018
"Is YouTube Really Worth It?"	15 January 2018	PewDiePie again discusses topics related the effect of YouTube on one's mental health.		
"PewDiePie Hej Monika Remix by Party In Backyard"	27 January 2018	PewDiePie sings a Party In Backyard remix cover of "Hej Hej Monika", a song originally recorded by Nic & the Family.		
"THIS VIDEO HAS GREAT ADS 📰 PEW NEWS📰"	1 April 2018	PewDiePie speaks about and criticizes YouTube's demonetization policies. The video is an episode of PewDiePie's Pew News series.		
"THIS CHANNEL WILL OVERTAKE PEWDIEPIE! LWIAY #0046"	29 August 2018	In a partially ironically toned video, PewDiePie addresses T-Series being projected to pass his channel in subscribers. This video is the 46th episode of PewDiePie's Last Week I Asked You series.		
"bitch lasagna"	5 October 2018	A diss track-styled music video aimed at T-Series, as part of their vying with PewDiePie to become the most-subscribed channel on YouTube. The video is banned in India as a result of PewDiePie's 2019 release of "Congratulations".		
"Okay, This Is Epic ( Bonus Meme ft. Ben Shapiro) [MEME REVIEW] 👏 👏#40"	2 November 2018	An episode of Meme Review noted for featuring Ben Shapiro. This video is the 40th episode of the Meme Review series.		
"DON'T Subscribe to Pewdiepie"	9 December 2018	PewDiePie addresses the growth of the "Subscribe to PewDiePie" meme, and at the end of the video, recommends various smaller channels for viewers to subscribe to. The video is an episode of PewDiePie's Pew News series.		
"PewDiePie's biggest OOPSIE. 📰 PEW NEWS📰"	11 December 2018	PewDiePie responds to media reports and criticism about him promoting E;R, who was among a larger amount of smaller YouTube channels recommend by PewDiePie. PewDiePie expressed that he recommended E;R's channel due to his Death Note review, was unaware of his other videos' reportedly anti-Semitic content, and removed his recommendation of E;R from his prior video. The video is an episode of PewDiePie's Pew News series.		
"YouTube Rewind 2018 but it's actually good"	27 December 2018	A YouTube Rewind–styled mashup featuring prominent Internet memes from 2018.		
2019
"Tik Toks most HILARIOUS funny compilations LAUGHING while CRYING O M G part 10"	28 January 2019	PewDiePie reacts to several TikTok videos. This video is the 10th episode in PewDiePie's TikTok series.		
"Will Smith hosts Meme Review w/ Elon Musk [MEME REVIEW] 👏 👏#50"	22 February 2019	An episode of Meme Review noted for featuring Elon Musk and Justin Roiland. This video is the 50th episode of the Meme Review series.		
"QnA with future Wifey"	3 March 2019	A questions and answers video featuring PewDiePie's then-fiancée Marzia Bisognin.		
"Congratulations"	31 March 2019	A music video mock-congratulating T-Series for surpassing PewDiePie to become the most-subscribed channel on YouTube. In diss track fashion, PewDiePie raps about controversial incidents involving T-Series. The video is banned in India.		
"Ending the Subscribe to Pewdiepie Meme"	28 April 2019	A vlog in which PewDiePie addresses the "Subscribe to PewDiePie" meme and movement in general, and announces he would like his audience to cease from spreading that message, specifically due to criminal acts referencing the meme.		
"The president of South Africa's Numbers - Cringe Tuesdays #7"	4 June 2019	PewDiePie comments on clips of former South African president Jacob Zuma struggling with numbers and statistics. This video is the 7th episode of PewDiePie's Cringe Tuesdays series.		
"Looking at my Analytics"	15 June 2019	PewDiePie discusses a relative decline in his channel's analytics.		
"Minecraft Part 1"	21 June 2019	The first part of PewDiePie's Minecraft Let's Play series.		
"Papers, Please!"	22 June 2019	PewDiePie commentates over Papers, Please gameplay.		
"Explaining why I REFUSED to play Minecraft - LWIAY #0085"	25 July 2019	PewDiePie explains his thoughts on Minecraft, such as why he refrained from playing the game earlier during his YouTube career. This video is the 85th episode of PewDiePie's Last Week I Asked You series.		
"Marzia & Felix - Wedding 19.08.2019"	24 August 2019	A wedding video featuring PewDiePie and his wife Marzia Kjellberg.		
"Best Week Ever. LWIAY #0089"	26 August 2019	PewDiePie visits the r/PewdiepieSubmissions subreddit and reacts to fan submissions, memes, and reactions to his wedding and his channel reaching 100 million subscribers. This video is the 89th episode of PewDiePie's Last Week I Asked You series.		
"Unboxing 100 MIL YouTube AWARD!!"	10 September 2019	PewDiePie reviews his past content up to him reaching the 100 million subscriber milestone. He additionally unboxes the Red Diamond Creator Award, given to him by YouTube for reaching the milestone, and announces a $50,000 donation to the Anti-Defamation League (ADL).		
"My 100 Mil Award BROKE! - LWIAY #0091"	12 September 2019	PewDiePie reacts to fan submissions on his subreddit. He also rescinds his $50,000 donation to the ADL, citing that he did not select a charity he was personally passionate about. This video is the 91st episode of PewDiePie's Last Week I Asked You series.		
"Hong Kong vs Joker Ends Fortnite [MEME REVIEW] 👏 👏#68"	16 October 2019	PewDiePie reacts to various memes, including some about the 2019–20 Hong Kong protests, as well as some that compare Xi Jinping to Winnie-the-Pooh. The video is the 68th episode of PewDiePie's Meme Review series.		
"Pewdiepie Is BANNED in China LWIAY #0096"	19 October 2019	PewDiePie explains that his content was banned in China, after he shared memes comparing Xi Jinping to Winnie-the Pooh and spoke about the 2019–20 Hong Kong protests. This video is the 96th episode of PewDiePie's Last Week I Asked You series.		
"Mine All Day (Minecraft Music Video)"	23 October 2019	A music video with two parts: The first part is an animation in the style of Minecraft, with PewDiePie flaunting his in-game achievements, and the second part is a live action music video with PewDiePie flaunting his real-life achievements.		
"I hate twitter"	16 December 2019	In narration, PewDiePie discusses philosophical concepts while he criticizes Twitter and explains why he left it.		
"Breaking News: 'Pewdiepie Has QUIT YouTube' 📰PEW NEWS 📰"	17 December 2019	PewDiePie discusses news, with the highlighting topic being news outlets falsely reporting that he was ending his YouTube career. The video is an episode of PewDiePie's Pew News series.		
"Answering Very Personal Questions"	28 December 2019	In a vlog format, PewDiePie answers personal questions from his fans.		
"YouTube Rewind 2019, but it's actually good"	29 December 2019	The sequel to YouTube Rewind 2018, but it's actually good, PewDiePie makes a YouTube Rewind–styled mashup featuring prominent Internet memes from 2019.		

=== 2020–24 ===
PewDiePie videos on YouTube (listed by upload date)
Video name	Upload date	Description / notes	Video	Ref.
2020
"Pewdiepie NETWORTH revealed! 📰PEW NEWS 📰"	4 January 2020	PewDiePie responds to various media stories about himself, relating to his net worth, his comments on his fans from Malaysia and Singapore, and a web comic meme. The video is an episode of PewDiePie's Pew News series.		
"It's been real, but I'm out! - LWIAY #00106"	15 January 2020	PewDiePie announces he will be going on hiatus, in addition to reviewing memes from his subreddit. This video is the 106th episode of PewDiePie's Last Week I Asked You series.		
"I went on a break for 30 days & THIS HAPPENED - LWIAY #00107"	21 February 2020	PewDiePie returns from a hiatus and discusses what he did during it, in addition to reviewing memes from his subreddit. This video is the 107th episode of PewDiePie's Last Week I Asked You series.		
"Subnautica Part 1 (OMG GAME)"	15 March 2020	PewDiePie plays Subnautica. The video is the 1st episode in PewDiePie's Subnautica series.		
"Do All Millionaires Think The Same?"	21 April 2020	PewDiePie comments on and reacts to "Do All Millionaires Think The Same?", a video by Jubilee.		
"Man Puts Mayo in His Hair......."	24 April 2020	PewDiePie comments on and reacts to the fourth season of 90 Day Fiancé.		
"I Hit 10 Years Of YouTube Uploads!"	5 May 2020	PewDiePie celebrates his 10th year on YouTube by watching videos he's made throughout his career, talking about his history as he goes through.		
"Famous people who can't STAND PewDiePie"	13 May 2020	PewDiePie reviews memes from his subreddit. This video is the 113th episode of PewDiePie's LWIAY series, however, the video is not in the LWIAY playlist.		
"Leaking My Email Address..."	20 May 2020	PewDiePie addresses him accidentally leaking his personal email addressed as well as reviewing memes from his subreddit. This video is an episode of PewDiePie's LWIAY series.		
"Rocket League / Marzia - for George Floyd / Sentencing Project / Victims, Business Relief"	3 June 2020	A livestream of PewDiePie playing video games such as Terraria to raise money for the Sentencing Project, victims of police brutality, and for small businesses affected by Black Lives Matter demonstrators looting and rioting after the murder of George Floyd. The livestream was accessible to channel members only.		
"Reviewing Memes With KSI [MEME REVIEW] 👏 👏#86"	22 November 2020	PewDiePie and KSI review internet memes together. A company later claimed all revenue from the video due to a brief, unrecognizable cover of a Celine Dion song played on a recorder. The video is the 86th episode of PewDiePie's Meme Review series.		
"Minecraft But I regret Everything.. - Minecraft Hardcore #1"	7 December 2020	PewDiePie starts a new Minecraft Hardcore series, saying goodbye to his previous world before beginning a fresh Hardcore world where death is permanent. He quickly expresses regret over leaving his old builds and pets behind while gathering resources and facing early challenges. The video is the 1st episode in PewDiePie's Minecraft Hardcore series.		
2021
"Coco" †	14 February 2021	A diss track-styled music video directed at Cocomelon.		
"Vegan Teacher is in Love with me"	10 August 2021	PewDiePie and CinnamonToastKen react to a video by That Vegan Teacher in which she praises him for supposedly becoming vegan based on out-of-context clips. PewDiePie states that he is not vegan as he eats fish, making him a pescatarian.		
"YouTube Removed The Dislike Button.. 📰PEW NEWS 📰"	11 November 2021	PewDiePie discusses YouTube's decision to hide the public dislike count on videos (while keeping the button itself). He argues that the change removes a useful indicator of video quality for viewers and questions YouTube's stated reasons for the update. The video is an episode of PewDiePie's Pew News series.		
"Youtube copyright seriously pisses me off.. 📰PEW NEWS 📰"	10 December 2021	PewDiePie criticizes YouTube's copyright system, arguing that it tends to side with large companies even in fair use cases. He also says that a company called RepostNetwork claimed his original songs "on behalf of PewDiePie" without his permission, and that his dispute over one of the claims was rejected. The video is an episode of PewDiePie's Pew News series.		
2022
"It finally happened!"	9 May 2022	A travel vlog-styled account of PewDiePie's last days living in the United Kingdom and his announcement that his move to Japan with Marzia was finally realized.		
"We Failed"	31 May 2022	PewDiePie vlogs his experiences shortly after moving to Japan.		
"Why Japan?"	6 June 2022	In a vlog format, PewDiePie answers fan questions relating to his move to Japan.		
"My Dog Cringes at TikToks.."	26 July 2022	PewDiePie reacts to TikToks while holding his dog, Maya. This video attracted media controversy stemming from PewDiePie's reaction to a video originally posted by Scarlet May, a deaf content creator. PewDiePie later edited out the portion reacting to May from his video.		
"Mr Beast passed me in s ubs.."	12 December 2022	PewDiePie reacts to MrBeast surpassing him as the most-subscribed individual YouTuber. He reviews several books to show that he no longer cares about subscriber counts, then jokingly references old tweets from MrBeast about deleting his channel and tells him to do so within 24 hours.		
2023
"We're having a baby!"	5 February 2023	PewDiePie and his wife Marzia announce they are expecting their first child together.		
"Saying bye for a while now"	29 June 2023	PewDiePie vlogs during a trip with his wife Marzia to Mount Fuji. He announces he will be taking an indefinite hiatus from YouTube as he expects to become a father soon.		
"I'm a dad now"	11 August 2023	Announcing he is now officially a father, PewDiePie vlogs following Marzia giving birth to their son.		
"The real reason I left Sweden."	16 November 2023	In a long-form vlog, PewDiePie discusses his life in Sweden, including why he emigrated from the country.		
2024
"I Drew Every Day for 100 DAYS!"	31 January 2024	PewDiePie discusses and showcases his progress after drawing for 100 consecutive days.		
"YouTubers are ruining Japan"	22 May 2024	PewDiePie criticizes certain YouTubers for disrespectful and disruptive behavior in Japan, citing examples of trespassing, public nuisance, and exploitation of local culture.		
"Podcasts have gone too far.."	28 November 2024	PewDiePie discusses the large number of podcasts available and comments on the popularity of the medium.		

=== Since 2025 ===
PewDiePie videos on YouTube (listed by upload date)
Video name	Upload date	Description / notes	Video	Ref.
2025
"I installed Linux (so should you)"	26 April 2025	PewDiePie discusses switching from Windows to Linux, covering the installation process, customization options, and advantages such as reduced bloatware and improved gaming support via Proton.		
"I'm DONE with Google"	26 June 2025	PewDiePie shares that due to privacy concerns, he has DeGoogled, instead using hardware and software such as Steam Deck, Graphene, and a Raspberry Pi.		
"STOP. Using AI Right now"	31 October 2025	PewDiePie experiments with self-hosted AI using his custom-built multi-GPU computer, demonstrating locally run large language models, his custom ChatOS interface, and a system of multiple AI agents that collaborate to produce answers. He also discusses plans to use the system to develop his own AI model.		
2026
"I Trained My Own AI... It beat ChatGPT"	27 February 2026	PewDiePie documents training his own home AI coding model and claims it outperformed ChatGPT-4 and other larger models on coding benchmarks.		
"Ending the vlogs."	23 May 2026	PewDiePie announces that he and Marzia will end their regular family vlogs in September to protect their son Björn's privacy and allow him to decide later whether he wants an online presence. The video includes footage of family activities in Japan.		
"Thank you and Goodbye."	22 September 2026	PewDiePie concludes his regular family vlog series with a final video featuring footage of his family and reflections on their time sharing their lives online. He says that while the family will no longer make regular vlogs, he will continue creating videos and may share occasional updates in other formats.		
"I seriously should NOT be dropping this."	1 October 2026	PewDiePie unveils Ajax, a fine-tuned version of Alibaba's Qwen3.5-9B model that is designed to run locally as an always-on assistant for his self-hosted Odysseus workspace. He says OpenAI suspended his account twice during the model's development, with one ban citing "distillation".		

== Collaborative videography ==
PewDiePie's collaborative appearances on other YouTube channels (listed by upload date)
Video name	Channel	Upload date	Description / notes	Video	Ref.
"Rasputin vs Stalin. Epic Rap Battles of History"	ERB	22 April 2013	PewDiePie appears as Mikhail Baryshnikov in an episode of Epic Rap Battles of History featuring fictionalized portrayals of Grigori Rasputin and Joseph Stalin.		
"YouTube Rewind: What Does 2013 Say?" ⌀	YouTube (Note: This YouTube channel was named "YouTube Spotlight" at the time of the video's upload.)	11 December 2013	PewDiePie appears as himself in an episode of the annual YouTube Rewind series.		
"The Catacombs Challenge - Behind the Scenes" ⌀	Marzia (Note: This YouTube channel was named "CutiePieMarzia" at the time of the video's upload.)	17 August 2014	Marzia Bisognin vlogs with her boyfriend PewDiePie in Paris during their promotion for As Above, So Below.		
""How to make it big on Youtube" with Pewdiepie | SVT/NRK/Skavlan"	Skavlan	26 November 2014	PewDiePie gives tips on how to "make it big on YouTube".		
"YouTube Rewind: Turn Down for 2014" ⌀	YouTube	9 December 2014	PewDiePie appears as himself in an episode of the annual YouTube Rewind series.		
"YouTube Rewind: Now Watch Me 2015 | #YouTubeRewind" ⌀	YouTube	9 December 2015	PewDiePie appears as himself in an episode of the annual YouTube Rewind series.		
"YouTube Rewind: The Ultimate 2016 Challenge | #YouTubeRewind" ⌀	YouTube	7 December 2016	PewDiePie appears as himself in an episode of the annual YouTube Rewind series.		
"My Epic Collab With Pewdiepie!!"	h3h3Productions	8 February 2017	A satirical collaboration in which Ethan Klein of h3h3Productions stages a comedic "paid collab" with PewDiePie.		N/A
"INDIAN SNACKS REVIEW with PewDiePie"	Saiman Says	2 May 2019	Indian YouTuber Saiman Says reviews Indian food with PewDiePie while on his trip to Brighton after Saiman called him out.		
"PewDiePie on Why He Stopped Drinking"	Cold Ones Clips	16 July 2019	A clip from an episode of the Cold Ones video podcast, in which PewDiePie discusses his former drinking habit.		
"6 Bros vs 1 Secret PewDiePie Odd Man Out"	Jubilee	21 May 2021	PewDiePie participates as the secret contestant in an episode of Jubilee's Odd Man Out series, attempting to blend in with six of his fans. He is voted out in the first round.		
"HE'S FINALLY HERE (ft. @PewDiePie) Trash Taste #124"	Trash Taste	4 November 2022	PewDiePie appears as a guest on the Trash Taste podcast, discussing his move to Japan, life there, anime, gaming, and other topics.		
"$1 vs $250,000 Vacation!"	MrBeast	12 August 2023	PewDiePie and MrBeast meet up for the first time in person at Fuji-Q Highland where they ride the Eejanaika roller coaster.		
"DAD IS BACK! (ft.@PewDiePie ) Trash Taste #188"	Trash Taste	26 January 2024	PewDiePie returns as a guest on the Trash Taste podcast, discussing fatherhood, life in Japan, and other topics.		N/A
"PewDiePie takes me bouldering in Tokyo"	Magnus Midtbø	18 April 2024	PewDiePie goes bouldering with professional climber Magnus Midtbø at a gym in Tokyo.		N/A
"i turned pewdiepie into a geoguessr pro MEMORY LANE"	Rainbolt	17 October 2025	PewDiePie plays GeoGuessr with Rainbolt, identifying locations from his past vlogs and travels.		N/A

== Other videography ==
Other appearances by PewDiePie on other YouTube channels (listed by upload date)
Video name	Channel	Upload date	Description / notes	Video	Ref.
"Goodbye Youtube." ⌀	Marzia	22 October 2018	In a vlog, PewDiePie's then-fiancée Marzia Bisognin announces her retirement from YouTube. PewDiePie appears via archived footage.		
"chatting epicly"	PewDiePie	25 May 2019	PewDiePie talks with viewers of his livestream. This video was livestreamed on video platform DLive, rather than on YouTube.		
"PewDiePie Plays Minecraft w/James Charles on DLive - PRACTICE ROUND on Minecraft Monday - PewDiePie"	Best Twitch Moments	1 July 2019	Through archived footage, PewDiePie and beauty YouTuber James Charles plays the practice round in Keemstar's Minecraft tournament, Minecraft Monday, together.		
"PewDiePie Plays Minecraft w/James Charles on DLive - GAME 1 on Minecraft Monday - PewDiePie"	Best Twitch Moments	1 July 2019	Through archived footage, PewDiePie and beauty YouTuber James Charles play Keemstar's Minecraft tournament, Minecraft Monday, together.		
"YouTube Rewind 2019: For the Record | #YouTubeRewind" ⌀	YouTube	5 December 2019	Through archived footage, PewDiePie appears as himself in an episode of the annual YouTube Rewind series.		

== See also ==
- List of most-viewed YouTube channels
- List of diss tracks § YouTube
- Scare PewDiePie – Episodes
