= List of diss tracks =

This List of diss tracks details songs that were recorded with the primary purpose of verbally attacking someone else, usually another artist, whether via an audio track or a YouTube video clip.

== Audio diss tracks ==
Date released	Song title	Artist(s)	Target(s)	Response to (if applicable)	Notes	Ref(s)
1755	"Yankee Doodle"	Dr. Richard Shuckburgh	The American Colonists		Written by British soldiers as an anthem mocking American colonists from the French and Indian War through to the American Revolution.	
1840	"Tippecanoe and Tyler Too"	Alexander Coffman Ross	Martin Van Buren	The 1840 United States presidential election	Published by the Whig Party to endorse William Henry Harrison's candidacy over incumbent Martin Van Buren.	
1861	"Union Dixie"	Unknown Later sung by Tennessee Ernie Ford	Confederate States Of America		A pro-Union parody of the Confederacy's unofficial anthem. It reworked Dan Emmett's original 1859 melody to mock the seceding Southern states, criticize the institution of Slavery, and reinforce Federal authority.	
1918	"Quem São Eles?"	Sinhô	Rival sambistas who each claimed they wrote the song Pelo Telefone	"Pelo Telefone"	Result of conflicts between sambistas over the authorship of Pelo Telefone, a popular samba song recorded in 1916. The resulting musical feud between artists is possibly the first recorded in history.	
1918	"Aggie War Hymn"	J.V. "Pinky" Wilson	University of Texas	"The Eyes of Texas"	The unofficial fight song of Texas A&M University	
1919	"Já Te Digo"	Pixinguinha	Sinhô	"Quem São Eles?"	Pixinguinha's response to Sinhô.	
1933	"Rapaz Folgado"	Noel Rosa	Wilson Batista	"Lenço no pescoço"	Critique of singer Wilson Batista in the context of the golden age of Malandragem culture.	
1938	"La Gota Fría"	Emiliano Zuleta	Lorenzo Morales	Morales fleeing from an accordion challenge	Became a standard, one of the best known in the vallenato repertoire.	
1941	"When That Man is Dead and Gone"	Irving Berlin	Adolf Hitler	Hitler's dictatorship and Nazi Germany in general	A recording by Al Bowlly and Jimmy Mesene was released in 1941 and turned out to be Bowlly's final performance before his death during The Blitz.	
1948	"Carl Nielsen, vor store komponist "	Rued Langgaard	Carl Nielsen		A protest against the musical world around him, particularly Langgaard's private symbol for this: Carl Nielsen.	
1952	"It Wasn't God Who Made Honky Tonk Angels"	Kitty Wells	Hank Thompson	Hank Thompson song "The Wild Side of Life"	Contrary to Hank Thompson's view of women in his song "The Wild Side of Life", Wells sings that men are often at fault for adultery.	
1954	"Old Man Trump"	Woody Guthrie	Fred Trump	Trump's alleged greed and racially discriminatory housing practices		
1962	"You Keep Her"	Joe Tex	James Brown	Brown getting together with Tex's ex-wife Bea Ford	After Brown and Ford broke up, Brown wrote to Tex stating he could have Ford back. Tex responded with "You Keep Her", further inflaming the ongoing feud between the two artists and leading to an attempted assassination attempt against Tex by Brown.	
1963	"Blackhead Chinaman"	Prince Buster	Derrick Morgan	Morgan recording for producer Leslie Kong		
1965	"Positively 4th Street"	Bob Dylan	Unknown/Multiple	Electric Dylan controversy	Likely refers to residents of New York City's Greenwich Village who opposed Dylan's shift away from folk, though the exact target(s) of the song is(are) unclear.	
1967	"Run for Cover"	Lee "Scratch" Perry	Coxsone Dodd	Dodd's alleged underpayment of Perry		
Nov 22, 1968	"Sexy Sadie"	The Beatles	Maharishi Mahesh Yogi	The Maharishi's alleged sexual harassment of Mia Farrow	John Lennon originally criticized the Maharishi in the song, whose working title was "Maharishi". But he changed it to "Sexy Sadie" at George Harrison's request.	
Sep 11, 1970	"Happy Family"	King Crimson	The Beatles	The separation of the Beatles		
Aug 2, 1971	"Too Many People"	Paul McCartney	John Lennon and Yoko Ono	The Beatles' breakup	Criticizes Lennon and Ono for "preaching practices" and telling people what to do.	
Sep 9, 1971	"How do You Sleep?"	John Lennon	Paul McCartney	McCartney's successful lawsuit to dissolve the Beatles, as well as the diss track "Too Many People"	Lennon mentions the "Paul is Dead " theories, the conflict with Allen Klein, criticizes Paul's ego, and attacks Paul's musical style.	
Nov 12, 1971	Five Per Cent for Nothing	Yes	Former manager Roy Flynn	An agreement negotiated by Flynn, who Yes had fired the year before, that gave him five percent of the band's revenues in perpetuity	A 35-second instrumental, the shortest song Yes ever recorded. The title was changed after the band learned of Flynn's deal.	
Nov 29, 1971	"One of These Days"	Pink Floyd	Jimmy Young		A threat directed towards BBC Radio 1 and Radio 2 DJ, Jimmy Young whom the band disliked. The only lyrics are "One of these days, I'm going to cut you into little pieces".	
1972	"Tomorrow"	Strawbs	Former band member Rick Wakeman	Dave Cousins' disappointment with Rick Wakeman for leaving the band without a proper farewell	Rick Wakeman and Dave Cousins have since made amends, including recording the album Hummingbird together.	
1972	"You're So Vain"	Carly Simon	Warren Beatty, plus two unknown men		Simon admitted in 2015 that Beatty was the principal subject of the second verse of the song, but alluded in interviews to two other men also being subjects.	
1972	"Only a Fool Would Say That"	Steely Dan	John Lennon	Statements made by Lennon on national talk shows		
1973	"Smooth Dancer"	Deep Purple	Ritchie Blackmore			
1973	"Cow Thief Skank"	Lee "Scratch" Perry	Niney the Observer			
1974	"En Cuba No Falta Nada"	José María Peñaranda	Fidel Castro	Castro's authoritarian rule of Cuba	A censored version of the song titled "El del Tabacón" was also released.	
1974	"Sweet Home Alabama"	Lynyrd Skynyrd	Neil Young	Young's songs "Southern Man" and "Alabama"	The band felt that Young had slandered the entire American South based on the actions of a few individuals.	
1974	"Dead Finks Don't Talk"	Brian Eno	Bryan Ferry	Eno's departure from Roxy Music over creative differences with Ferry	Initially denying that the song had any particular meaning, Eno later noted that he had subconsciously made the track to spite Ferry.	
1975	"Death on Two Legs (Dedicated to...)"	Queen	Norman Sheffield	Sheffield's alleged mismanagement and embezzlement of the band's earnings		
Apr 21, 1975	"Let's Take It to the Stage"	Funkadelic	James Brown, Kool & The Gang, Rufus, and others		Makes fun of the R&B, funk, and soul status quo.	
Apr 1, 1976	"Silly Love Songs"	Paul McCartney and Wings	John Lennon	Lennon referring to McCartney's compositions as "silly love songs"		
Dec 20, 1976	"Silver Springs"	Fleetwood Mac	Lindsey Buckingham	Stevie Nicks' relationship with fellow band member Buckingham		
Oct 27, 1977	"New York"	Sex Pistols	New York Dolls		Accuses the New York Dolls of being frauds.	
Oct 27, 1977	"E.M.I."	Sex Pistols	EMI	EMI's termination of the Sex Pistols' contract		
1977	"Pigs (Three Different Ones)"	Pink Floyd	Margaret Thatcher and Mary Whitehouse		Roger Waters (the song's writer) stated that the second and third verses are directed at the two political figures respectively, while the first verse is more general and understood to be directed at businessmen in general.	
1977	"Idiot Box"	The Damned	Television and Tom Verlaine	Television refusing to allow The Damned to play a show with them		
1979	"California Über Alles"	Dead Kennedys	Jerry Brown	Brown's campaign for president	Satire of Brown, imagining him establishing a "hippie fascist" society.	
1981	"Battle w/Busy Bee"	Kool Moe Dee	Busy Bee Starski		Often viewed as the rap battle that changed rap forever, Kool Moe Dee went directly at rival emcee Busy Bee at the 1981 Harlem World Christmas celebration.	
1982	"John Wayne Was a Nazi"	MDC	John Wayne	John Wayne's advocacy of white supremacy	Attacks Wayne for his films that glorified white supremacy and war.	
1984	"Roxanne's Revenge"	Roxanne Shante	U.T.F.O.	"Roxanne, Roxanne"	A 7-minute response to "Roxanne, Roxanne"'s misogynistic social commentary against women who turn down U.T.F.O.'s sexual advances. 14-year old Roxanne created the diss track after U.T.F.O reneged on a show organized by her friend, leading to several diss tracks being directed at Roxanne.	
1985	"Zanz Kant Danz"	John Fogerty	Saul Zaentz	Fogerty's long-standing financial dispute with Zaentz and his label Fantasy Records	The song was re-titled "Vanz Kant Danz" a few months after the release of the album Centerfield in an unsuccessful attempt to avoid a defamation lawsuit from Zaentz.	
1986	"Mentiras"	Lupita D'Alessio	Carlos Reinoso	D'Alessio's abusive relationship with Reinoso		
Oct 12, 1986	"Scum"	Nick Cave and the Bad Seeds	NME journalists Mat Snow and Antonella Black		Single-sided flexidisc given away at gigs promoting Your Funeral... My Trial, including a fold-out poster of the lyrics.	
Dec 1, 1986	"South Bronx"	Boogie Down Productions	MC Shan and the Juice Crew	DJ Mr. Magic's criticism of one of KRS-One's early records	The first diss track in The Bridge Wars, one of the earliest hip-hop rivalries.	
1987	"Astley In The Noose"	The Wonder Stuff	Rick Astley		Disses Astley's voice in general but makes reference to his cover of the track "When I Fall In Love".	
Mar 3, 1987	"The Bridge Is Over"	Boogie Down Productions	MC Shan, Marley Marl, the Juice Crew, Roxanne Shante and rappers from Queens, NY and the Queensbridge projects.	"The Bridge" by MC Shan	Part of The Bridge Wars.	
Aug 8, 1987	"Kill That Noise"	MC Shan	Boogie Down Productions	"South Bronx"	Part of The Bridge Wars.	
Nov 3, 1987	"How Ya Like Me Now"	Kool Moe Dee	LL Cool J	The claim that LL Cool J stole his rap style		
1988	"Mother"	Danzig	Tipper Gore	The introduction of "Parental Advisory" warnings on music albums by the Parents Music Resource Center, led by Tipper Gore and parents groups		
1988	"Culpable o No (Miénteme Como Siempre)"	Luis Miguel	Mariana Yazbek	Mariana Yazbek's infidelity	Based on the crisis in Luis Miguel's relationship with photographer Mariana Yazbek.	
Jan 19, 1988	"Liar"	Megadeth	Former band member Chris Poland		Megadeth lead vocalist/guitarist Dave Mustaine claimed Poland was stealing guitars and selling them for heroin money.	
Aug 16, 1988	"Bye Mamá"	Alejandra Guzmán	Silvia Pinal	Family distancing between Pinal and Guzmán	Alejandra Guzmán complains that her mother Silvia Pinal was an absent mother.	
Sep 28, 1988	"Miracle Man"	Ozzy Osbourne	Televangelist Jimmy Swaggart	Swaggart's various controversies	Attacks Swaggart for his hypocrisy in being a televangelist who preaches moral behavior while also engaging in sin and vice.	
Jun 4, 1990	"Kool Thing"	Sonic Youth featuring Chuck D	LL Cool J	The interview LL Cool J gave in the September edition of 1989 in Spin Magazine where he talks to Kim Gordon about his satisfaction with the lack of female personalities in rap.		
Jun 17, 1990	"To da Break of Dawn"	LL Cool J	Kool Moe Dee, Ice-T, and MC Hammer	The Syndicate and I'm Your Pusher by Ice-T	After two disses in 1988, Ice-T later defended Cool J when he was arrested for profanity in his 1989 track Freedom of Speech, and before LL Cool J released his response diss.	
Aug 14, 1990	"100 Miles and Runnin'" and "Real Niggaz"	N.W.A.	Ice Cube		Start of the N.W.A. / Ice Cube rivalry following Ice Cube leaving the group over royalty disputes after the Straight Outta Compton Tour. Led to the other N.W.A. members referring to him as a "traitor".	
Mar 4, 1991	"Fuck Compton"	Tim Dog	DJ Quik, Michel'le, N.W.A, Compton, West Coast rap, and Gangsta Rap	East Coast–West Coast hip-hop rivalry		
Apr 2, 1991	"Güera"	Alejandra Guzmán	Paulina Rubio	A love triangle between Guzmán, Paulina Rubio, and Erik Rubín		
May 1, 1991	"Pop Goes the Weasel"	3rd Bass	Vanilla Ice			
Aug 13, 1991	"Word to the Badd!!"	Jermaine Jackson	Michael Jackson		The song was edited for the album.	
Sep 17, 1991	"Get in the Ring"	Guns N' Roses	Music critics in general. Those mentioned by name are from Hit Parader (Andy Secher), Circus, Kerrang! (Mick Wall), and Spin (Bob Guccione, Jr.).		Mick Wall was thought to have been mentioned because of his book Guns N' Roses: The Most Dangerous Band in the World. Wall denies this and claims the real reason was an interview he conducted in early 1990 for Kerrang! that included Rose's threat to harm Vince Neil of Mötley Crüe after an incident involving Neil's wife and Izzy Stradlin.	
Oct 29, 1991	"No Vaseline"	Ice Cube	Former N.W.A bandmates Eazy-E, Dr. Dre, MC Ren, DJ Yella, and their manager, Jerry Heller	"100 Miles and Runnin'" and "Real Niggaz" from 100 Miles and Runnin', and "Message to B.A." from efiL4zaggiN by N.W.A	Ice Cube had previously made brief disses of N.W.A in the Jackin' For Beats and I Gotta Say What Up!!! tracks on his Kill at Will EP.	
Dec 9, 1991	"Miserablism"	Pet Shop Boys	Morrissey		Pokes fun at Morrissey's miserable persona.	
Aug 30, 1992	"Mío"	Paulina Rubio	Alejandra Guzmán	"Güera" by Alejandra Guzmán	Rubio's debut solo single.	
Dec 15, 1992	"Fuck wit Dre Day (And Everybody's Celebratin')"	Dr. Dre feat. Snoop Dogg	Eazy-E, Tim Dog, Ice Cube, and Luther (Luke) Campbell	"Fuck Compton" by Tim Dog	Eazy-E was Dre's former bandmate from the group N.W.A.	
Aug 26, 1993	"Real Muthaphuckkin G's"	Eazy-E feat. Dresta and B.G. Knocc Out	Former N.W.A bandmate Dr. Dre, his protégé Snoop Dogg, and their record label Death Row Records	"Fuck wit Dre Day (And Everybody's Celebratin')", and "Bitches Ain't Shit" by Dr. Dre		
Oct 19, 1993	"It's On"	Eazy-E	Snoop Dogg, Dr. Dre, and Tha Dogg Pound		A response to comments made in Dre's debut The Chronic.	
Mar 28, 1994	"Poles Apart"	Pink Floyd	Roger Waters	Separation of Roger Waters from the band		
Apr 25, 1994	"Give the Anarchist a Cigarette"	Chumbawumba	Bob Dylan	Dont Look Back	References a scene in a limousine where manager Albert Grossman tells Dylan, "They're calling you an anarchist now", to which Dylan replies, "Give the anarchist a cigarette".	
Aug 23, 1994	"What Would You Do?"	Tha Dogg Pound featuring Snoop Dogg	B.G. Knocc Out, Dresta, Eazy-E, Cold 187um, and Ruthless Records			
1994	"Bitch With A Perm"	Tim Dog	Snoop Dogg		The sleeve depicts a dog caricature of Snoop wearing a pendant reading "Snoop Pussy".	
Jun 16, 1995	"D.S."	Michael Jackson	Tom Sneddon		After Michael Jackson was accused of child sexual abuse, the district attorney for Santa Barbara County Thomas W. Sneddon Jr. led an investigation of Jackson in which Jackson was subjected to his genitalia being photographed.	
Jul 4, 1995	"I'll Stick Around"	Foo Fighters	Courtney Love		Speculated to be about Cobain's widow, Courtney Love, confirmed by ex-Nirvana drummer Dave Grohl in 2009.	
1996	"The Bitch in Yoo"	Common	Ice Cube, Mack 10, and WC	The trio's earlier track "Westside Slaughterhouse"	"Westside Slaughterhouse" was itself a response to Common's 1994 song, "I Used to Love H.E.R.", in which Common criticized gangster rappers.	
1996	"L.A., L.A."	Capone-N-Noreaga featuring Mobb Deep and Tragedy Khadafi	Tha Dogg Pound, Bone Thugs-N-Harmony, and the Los Angeles hip-hop scene	"New York, New York"		
Jun 4, 1996	"Hit 'Em Up"	Tupac Shakur featuring The Outlawz	Lil' Kim, Mobb Deep, Sean Combs, Chino XL Bad Boy Records, and the Notorious B.I.G.	"Who Shot Ya?" by The Notorious B.I.G. and Diddy	One of the most influential tracks in the East Coast–West Coast hip-hop rivalry.	
Jul 12, 1996	"Professional Widow"	Tori Amos	Courtney Love		While never confirmed, many believe this track is about Courtney Love.	
Aug 25, 1996	"Drop a Gem on 'Em"	Mobb Deep	Tupac Shakur	Shakur's "Hit 'Em Up"		
Sep 26, 1996	"Against All Odds"	Tupac Shakur	Nas, Mobb Deep, Haitian Jack, Sean "Puffy" Combs, Jimmy Henchman, King Tut, Stretch, De La Soul, Notorious B.I.G., and Dr. Dre		Released less than two weeks after Tupac's death.	
Sep 26, 1996	"Intro/ Bomb First (My Second Reply)"	Tupac Shakur	Nas, Notorious B.I.G., Jay-Z, Mobb Deep, Big L, and Xzibit		Released less than two weeks after Tupac's death.	
Sep 26, 1996	"Toss It Up"	Tupac Shakur	Dr. Dre, Puffy, Lil' Kim, Notorious B.I.G., Blackstreet, and Teddy Riley		Released less than two weeks after Tupac's death.	
1996	"I Shot Ya"	DMX	Tupac Shakur	East Coast–West Coast hip-hop rivalry	DMX's freestyle was made before Tupac's murder.	
Jan 7, 1997	"King Nothing"	Metallica	Guns N' Roses frontman Axl Rose			
Mar 25, 1997	"Kick in the Door"	The Notorious B.I.G.	Nas, Jeru the Damaja, Raekwon, Ghostface Killah, 2Pac, O.G.C., and the track's producer DJ Premier			
Oct 14, 1997	"Platypus (I Hate You)"	Green Day	Tim Yohannan	Yohannan kicking Green Day out of the 924 Gilman Street club for signing with the major label Reprise	The second and third verses correctly predicted Yohannan's death by cancer.	
Oct 14, 1997	"Reject"	Green Day	Angry mother of 8-year old	A letter sent by a parent complaining about the lyrical content of Green Day's previous album Insomniac	Lead singer Billie Joe Armstrong responded with a letter saying he writes music for himself. The song shares one lyric with the letter: "The difference between me and you, is I do what I want, and you do what you're told."	
1998	"Tupeu de borfaș"	La Familia	R.A.C.L.A., Getto Daci			
1998	Blood Type	Tragedy khadafi	Noreaga			
Feb 10, 1998	"Get At Me Dog"	DMX	K-Solo, 2Pac	K-Solo allegedly stealing the idea of Spellbound from DMX	DMX's first single.	
Mar 24, 1998	"Second Round K.O."	Canibus	LL Cool J	"4, 3, 2, 1"	Despite both artists collaborating on "4, 3, 2, 1" they felt that their original verses were dissing each other. They were asked to re-write them for the final track, but only Canibus' verse was changed.	
Aug 25, 1998	"Lost Ones"	Lauryn Hill	Wyclef Jean		While never confirmed, many believe this track is about Wyclef Jean.	
Oct 6, 1998	"Social Studies"	Bizzy Bone	Mitchell Johnson, Michael Carneal, Luke Woodham, Kipland Kinkel	Allegations that music by Bone Thugs-n-Harmony had inspired Mitchell Johnson to perpetrate the 1998 Westside Middle School shooting	Mainly aimed at Mitchell Johnson, whose English teacher Debbie Pelley testified that lyrics from The Art of War, as well as Tupac Shakur and Marilyn Manson, inspired Mitchell to commit a school shooting.	
Mar 14, 1999	"Quiet Storm"	Mobb Deep featuring Lil' Kim	Foxy Brown		Part of a long-running feud between the two artists, leading to a shooting in which more than 20 shots were fired.	
Aug 10, 1999	"How to Rob"	50 Cent	Dozens of artists including Jay-Z, Sean Combs, Wu-Tang Clan, Foxy Brown, Kurupt, Slick Rick, Big Pun, Busta Rhymes, DMX, Canibus		50 Cent's early attempts to make a hit resulted in this dissing of almost 50 different artists. He received a response from Jay-Z and Big Pun.	
Oct 12, 1999	"Your Life's on the Line"	50 Cent	Ja Rule			
Nov 1, 1999	"The Agony of Laffitte" / "Laffitte Don't Fail Me Now"	Spoon	Ron Laffitte and Sylvia Rhone		Laffitte was the A&R at Elektra Records who signed Spoon to an ill-fated deal and allegedly mishandled the band. Rhone was the label head who promised to keep the band on the roster, then dropped them after Laffitte was fired by the label.	
Apr 18, 2000	The Real Slim Shady	Eminem	Tom Green, Will Smith, Britney Spears, Christina Aguilera, Carson Daly, Fred Durst		Eminem disses a number of his critics, including Aguilera, who he claimed spread rumors about him being married to his ex-lover Kim.	
May 23, 2000	"Ear Drums Pop (Remix)"	Dilated Peoples, Planet Asia, Defari, Everlast, and Phil Da Agony	Eminem		Everlast's subliminal disses towards Eminem after a feud erupted between them because Eminem did not greet Everlast at a 1999 concert.	
Dec 2000	"Whitey's Revenge"	Everlast	Eminem	I Remember (Dedication to Whitey Ford)	Everlast questions Eminem's daughter's paternity.	
Dec 2000	"Quitter"	Eminem, D12	Everlast	Whitey's Revenge	The last diss track aimed towards Everlast released by Eminem. Its first half transitions into a remix of 2Pac's "Hit 'Em Up", which was itself another diss track.	
Dec 5, 2000	"I Remember (Dedication to Whitey Ford)"	Eminem	Everlast	Ear Drums Pop (Remix)		
Jul 17, 2001	"Loose Rap"	Aaliyah	Lareece		Speculation that this diss was due to Aaliyah's 1997 tour with Bone Thugs-n-Harmony and Mary J. Blige.	
Sep 11, 2001	"Takeover"	Jay-Z	Nas and Prodigy of Mobb Deep		Originally aimed at Mobb Deep's Prodigy, with whom Jay had a beef. But a third verse primarily aimed at Nas was added just beforeThe Blueprintalbum's release after Nas released "Stillmatic: Freestyle", which contained shots at Jay-Z.	
Dec 4, 2001	"Ether"	Nas	Jay-Z and Roc-A-Fella Records	"Takeover"		
Dec 11, 2001	"Supa Ugly"	Jay-Z	Nas	"Ether"	Freestyle over Nas' song "Got Ur Self a Gun" aimed to mock his style of rapping, but slowly transitions into another beat in which Jay-Z discusses his purported affair with Nas's ex-fiancée Carmen Bryan.	
Apr 29, 2002	"Without Me"	Eminem	Dick Cheney, Lynne Cheney, Limp Bizkit, Moby, Chris Kirkpatrick, and the FCC			
Oct 2002	"Pull Your Skirt Up"	Benzino	Eminem	The Source giving The Eminem Show a rating of 4 mics		
Nov 25, 2002	"Cry Me a River"	Justin Timberlake	Britney Spears	Allegations of an affair between Spears and Limp Bizkit frontman Fred Durst during her relationship with Timberlake	Spears responded in "Everytime".	
Jan 21, 2003	"Superman"	Eminem, Dina Rae	Mariah Carey		Elaborates on Eminem's claims to have dated Carey in 2001.	
Feb 18, 2003	"Go To Sleep"	Eminem, DMX, Obie Trice	Benzino	A response to Benzino's "Die Another Day"		
Apr 7, 2003	"Do Rae Me (Hailie's Revenge)"	Eminem, D12, Obie Trice	Ja Rule	"Loose Change"		
Apr 15, 2003	"Hail Mary (2003)"	Eminem, 50 Cent, Busta Rhymes	Ja Rule	"Loose Change"	Another track aimed at Rule that also recruits Busta Rhymes, due to Rule dissing him on "Loose Change".	
Jul 8, 2003	"Can't Hold Us Down"	Christina Aguilera	Eminem	A response to Eminem's disses on "The Real Slim Shady" and "Off The Wall"	Christina Aguilera accidentally exposed Eminem's secret marriage to his then-wife Kim on her MTV special and Eminem wasn't happy about it. He dissed her on "The Real Slim Shady" by saying that she had an affair with Carson Daly and Fred Durst, as well as saying that she gave Eminem an STD.	
Jul 7, 2003	"Bump Heads"	Eminem, 50 Cent, Tony Yayo, Lloyd Banks	Ja Rule			
Oct 7, 2003	"Be a Man"	Randy Savage	Hulk Hogan			
Nov 7, 2003 (leaked)	"Can-I-Bitch"	Eminem	Canibus	A response to Canibus' "U Didn't Care" and an answer song to the Pet Shop Boys' "The Night I Fell in Love".		
Nov 7, 2003 (leaked)	"Bully"	Eminem	Irv Gotti, Ja Rule, Benzino			
2004	"Foame de bani"	La Familia	B.U.G. Mafia	One of B.U.G. Mafia's members registered the La Familia name with the State Office for Inventions and Trademarks, thereby preventing them from using it any more		
Sep 14, 2004	"Something That I'm Not"	Megadeth	Metallica	Dave Mustaine's feelings about Metallica		
Mar 3, 2005	"Piggy Bank"	50 Cent	Nas, Ja Rule, Jadakiss, Shyne, Sheek Louch, Cassidy, Kelis, Fat Joe, The Lox, The Game			
Mar 9, 2005	"Checkmate"	Jadakiss	50 Cent	"Piggy Bank"		
Mar 22, 2005	"Hollaback Girl"	Gwen Stefani	Courtney Love	Love referring to Stefani as a "cheerleader" in an interview	Love also claimed to have slept with Stefani's then-husband Gavin Rossdale.	
May 22, 2006	"Georgia Bush"	Lil Wayne	George W. Bush	Scathing critique of George Bush and the failings of Bush, FEMA, and the rest of white America to respond to Hurricane Katrina	Following 20+ tracks of mostly braggadocio, this track is a shocking way to close Wayne's 2006 mixtape Dedication 2, with both the mixtape and the song receiving critical acclaim.	
Aug 22, 2006	"Jealousy"	Paris Hilton	Nicole Richie		Released shortly after feud rumors stemming from their co-starring in the TV show The Simple Life.	
Nov 21, 2006	"Don't Stop"	Outlawz	C. Delores Tucker and Bob Dole	Tucker and Dole proposing censorship of gangsta rap		
Feb 6, 2007	"Give It to Me"	Timbaland featuring Nelly Furtado and Justin Timberlake	Fergie, Scott Storch, Prince	A dispute over production credits for "Cry Me a River"	Speculated but not confirmed that Timberlake attacks Prince for making fun of "SexyBack". Rumored that Nelly Furtado's verse responds to a line in "Fergalicious" making fun of Furtado's "Promiscuous."	
Jun 5, 2007	"Mutilation Is the Most Sincere Form of Flattery"	Marilyn Manson	My Chemical Romance		Manson explained, "I'm embarrassed to be me, because these people are doing a really sad, pitiful, shallow version of what I've done."	
Jul 30, 2007	"Pussyole (Old Skool)"	Dizzee Rascal	Wiley		Widely interpreted as a diss towards Wiley and includes direct references to an older MC from Dizzee's past whom he once respected before their relationship soured.	
Jun 16, 2009	"Obsessed"	Mariah Carey	Eminem	Eminem's claims to have dated Carey in 2001, mentioned on "Superman" and "Bagpipes From Bagdad".		
Jul 28, 2009	"Ovarios"	Jenni Rivera	Graciela Beltran			
Jul 30, 2009	"The Warning"	Eminem	Mariah Carey and Nick Cannon	"Obsessed"		
Feb 23, 2010	"Cryin' Like a Bitch"	Godsmack	Nikki Sixx/Mötley Crüe	Mötley Crüe's Crüe Fest 2 tour in 2009	Neither Erna or drummer Shannon Larkin have confirmed the song was entirely directed at Sixx. Larkin claimed it was directed at San Diego Chargers quarterback Philip Rivers following a playoff loss, though Erna has subtly hinted in subsequent interviews at it being directed at Mötley Crüe.	
Oct 8, 2010	"Sag My Pants"	Hopsin	Lil Wayne, Drake, Soulja Boy, Lupe Fiasco, Rick Ross, and Tomica Wright			
Feb 14, 2011	"Black Friday"	Lil' Kim	Nicki Minaj	"Roman's Revenge"		
Dec 20, 2011	"Stupid Hoe"	Nicki Minaj	Lil' Kim	"Black Friday"	Kim later suggested that "Automatic" was similar to her unreleased material, and called Minaj "obnoxious and catty".	
Mar 23, 2012	"I Don't Give A"	Madonna and Nicki Minaj	Guy Ritchie and Lady Gaga	The divorce of Madonna and Guy Ritchie and comparisons with Lady Gaga	Lyrics that seem to take aim at her ex-husband, film director Guy Ritchie, and tabloids. Some of Minaj's verses are directed against pop singer Lady Gaga, with whom Madonna had been compared previously.	
Mar 26, 2012	"Fuck Up For Fun"	Azealia Banks	Iggy Azalea			
Apr 27, 2012	"3HunnaK"	Lil JoJo	Black Disciples	L's Anthem		
May 24, 2012	"Exodus 23:1"	Pusha T	Drake and Lil Wayne			
Oct 22, 2012	"All Too Well" "Better Man" "Babe" "Sad Beautiful Tragic" "The Moment I Knew"	Taylor Swift	Jake Gyllenhaal	End of Taylor Swift's relationship with Jake Gyllenhaal	Taylor Swift reminisces about a failed romantic relationship, her discovery of Gyllenhaal's alleged infidelity, and when Gyllenhaal didn't attend her 21st birthday.	
Mar 13, 2013	"Better Than That"	Marina	Ellie Goulding	Affair between Ellie and Marina's ex-boyfriend		
Jul 23, 2013 (leaked)	"So Legit"	Lana Del Rey	Lady Gaga		Features the singer dissing Lady Gaga, e.g. "Stefani, you suck."	
Aug 14, 2013	"Control"	Big Sean, Kendrick Lamar, Jay Electronica	J. Cole, Big K.R.I.T., Wale, Pusha T, Meek Mill, ASAP Rocky, Drake, Big Sean, Jay Electronica, Tyler the Creator, Mac Miller		Lauded as a "wake-up call" for the hip hop industry and the origin of the "cold" beef between Lamar and Drake, although rumors of sneak disses were repeatedly denied until the 2024 escalation.	
Aug 14, 2014	"Don't"	Ed Sheeran	Ellie Goulding	End of Ed Sheeran and Ellie Goulding's relationship	Tells the history of the relationship from Ed Sheeran's perspective.	
Sep 12, 2014	"I Don't Fuck With You"	Big Sean featuring E-40	Naya Rivera	End of Naya Rivera and Big Sean's relationship		
Jan 26, 2015	"I Bet"	Ciara	Future	Ciara and Future's break-up		
Mar 20, 2015	"Pepper Riddim"	Chipmunk	Big Narstie, Bugzy Malone, Devilman, Saskilla, DJ Cameo, Tinie Tempah	Disses of Chipmunk's "Fire in The Booth"		
Mar 25, 2015	"Chipmunk Reply"	Devilman featuring Mr. Traumatik	Chipmunk, Skepta, Jammer, Lil Wayne, JME	"Pepper Riddim" by Chipmunk		
Mar 25, 2015	"Relegation Riddim"	Bugzy Malone	Chipmunk	"Pepper Riddim" by Chipmunk		
Mar 25, 2015	"Off My Shoulder"	"Saskilla"	Chipmunk	"Pepper Riddim" by Chipmunk		
May 17, 2015	"Bad Blood"	Taylor Swift	Katy Perry (alleged)	Perry allegedly stealing Swift's backup dancers for her Prismatic World Tour	Selena Gomez, Lena Dunham, Hailee Steinfeld, Gigi Hadid, Ellie Goulding, Cara Delevingne, Zendaya, Jessica Alba, Cindy Crawford, and others appeared in the music video.	
Jul 29, 2015	"Charged Up"	Drake	Meek Mill	Meek Mill's claim that Drake uses ghostwriters		
Jul 31, 2015	"Back to Back"	Drake	Meek Mill	Meek Mill's claim that Drake uses ghostwriters		
Jan 25, 2016	"Flatline"	B.o.B	Neil DeGrasse Tyson	B.o.B's promotion of the conspiracy theory that the earth is flat		
Mar 28, 2016	"Famous"	Kanye West	Taylor Swift	Taylor Swift–Kanye West feud	West claimed that he called Swift about adding a lyric about her having sex with him because he had made her famous, but Swift denied this.	
Mar 30, 2016	"FDT"	YG featuring Nipsey Hussle	Donald Trump	Trump's rhetoric during his 2016 presidential campaign		
Apr 22, 2016	"Don't Hurt Yourself"	Beyoncé	Jay-Z	Jay-Z's infidelity and affairs		
Oct 16, 2016	"Shout Out to My Ex"	Little Mix	Zayn Malik	Malik's break-up with group member Perrie Edwards		
Oct 29, 2016	"Two Birds, One Stone"	Drake	Pusha T, Kid Cudi, and Meek Mill	Disses from Meek Mill after he and Drake's 2015 feud, Pusha T's jabs at Lil Wayne, and a tweet from Kid Cudi criticizing Drake and Kanye West for using ghostwriters in their song writing		
Dec 5, 2016	"Beef"	Soulja Boy	Quavo		The feud allegedly started when Soulja Boy reached out to Quavo, who didn't want to associate himself with Soulja due to his reputation for conflict and controversy. Soulja said he was friendly with Takeoff and Offset of Quavo's group Migos, but still had problems with Quavo himself.	
2017	"Raw Thoughts"	Chris Webby	Donald Trump, Ivanka Trump, Bill Clinton, Monica Lewinsky, Rex Tillerson, Jeff Sessions, Kid Rock, Scott Pruitt, Ted Cruz, Marco Rubio, Ben Carson, Hillary Clinton, Mike Pence, Paul Ryan, and the Koch Brothers			
2017	"Raw Thoughts II"	Chris Webby	Harvey Weinstein, Bill Clinton, Roy Moore, Bill O'Reilly, George W. Bush, Jeb Bush, Billy Bush, R. Kelly, XXXTentacion, Kevin Spacey, Bill Cosby, Jared Fogle, and Ted Cruz			
Feb 25, 2017	"Shether"	Remy Ma	Nicki Minaj	Minaj's verse on Gucci Mane's Make Love		
May 8, 2017	"Enemies"	Bali Baby	Rico Nasty, Asian Doll, and Cuban Doll	Asian Doll and Bali Baby's physical altercation at SXSW and the collaboration of Asian Doll and Rico Nasty on the track "Amigos"	Asian Doll attacked Bali Baby at the SXSW with videos of their fight surfacing online.	
May 18, 2017	"Calle Sin Salida"	Tempo	Residente	Residente's comments at the 2017 Latin Billboard Music Awards conference	Accuses Residente of "betraying" the Reggaeton, giving him 72 hours to respond.	
May 19, 2017	"Swish Swish"	Katy Perry featuring Nicki Minaj	Allegedly Taylor Swift and Remy Ma	"Bad Blood"		
May 19, 2017	"Mis Disculpas"	Residente	Tempo	"Calle Sin Salida"	Emphasizes Tempo's arrest for illegal possession of weapons and drug trafficking back in 2002, calling him an "Instagram rapper".	
Jul 18, 2017	"Motion Sickness"	Phoebe Bridgers	Ryan Adams	Alleged sexual harassment and emotional abuse by Adams against Bridgers and other women		
Aug 24, 2017	"Look What You Made Me Do"	Taylor Swift	Kanye West, Kim Kardashian, and Katy Perry	Response to West's "Famous", and possibly Perry's "Swish Swish"		
Sep 1, 2017	"How Do You Sleep?"	LCD Soundsystem	Tim Goldsworthy		Some observers have pointed to the lyrics being a reference to a DFA Records lawsuit filed against Goldsworthy in 2013 accusing him of "breach of contract" and using DFA Records' bank accounts in an unauthorized manner.	
Nov 19, 2017	"Hate Me Now"	Joseline Hernandez	Cardi B			
Dec 22, 2017	"Piggyback"	Melanie Martinez	Timothy Heller	Heller's rape allegations against Martinez	Martinez tweeted that the allegations "horrified and saddened" her and that Heller "never said no to what they chose to do together".	
Jan 31, 2018	"Sizzle"	Cuban Doll	Rocky Badd	Alleged altercation between Cuban Doll and Rocky Badd		
Feb 2, 2018	"Ragdoll"	Rocky Badd	Cuban Doll	"Sizzle"		
Feb 13, 2018	"Mia Khalifa"	iLoveFriday	Mia Khalifa	A fake tweet credited to Khalifa in which she allegedly criticizes group member Aqsa for smoking in a hijab in a music video.		
Apr 27, 2018	"Lift Yourself"	Kanye West	Drake	Drake's interest in using the instrumental track for himself.	Almost entirely instrumental; towards the end of the song, West assures listeners that the following verse is going to be great, before scatting over the remainder of the track. Widely interpreted as an attempt to troll Drake by using the beat in a non-serious manner.	
May 25, 2018	"Infrared"	Pusha T	Drake	Allegations of Drake using ghostwriters		
May 25, 2018	"Duppy Freestyle"	Drake	Pusha T, Kanye West	"Infrared"	Drake questions Pusha T's drug dealing background and denies the ghostwriting allegations leveled against him. Drake also attacks Kanye West for seemingly resenting fashion designer Virgil Abloh after the latter left West's company Yeezy to become the creative director of Louis Vuitton.	
May 29, 2018	"The Story of Adidon"	Pusha T	Drake	"Duppy Freestyle"	Alleges that Drake is hiding a child named Adonis that he had with former pornstar Sophie Brussaux. Also attacks Drake's main producer 40 for his multiple sclerosis. Drake later confirmed Adonis's existence on his 2018 album Scorpion.	
Jun 1, 2018	"I Kill People"	Trippie Redd featuring Chief Keef and Tadoe	6ix9ine			
Aug 21, 2018	"Sicko Mode"	Travis Scott featuring Drake	Pusha T, Kanye West, Common	Drake's long-running feud with Kanye West, Pusha T, and Common		
Aug 31, 2018	"Not Alike"	Eminem featuring Royce da 5'9"	Machine Gun Kelly	Comments Kelly made about Eminem's daughter when she was underage		
Aug 31, 2018	"Bad Boy"	G-Eazy	Machine Gun Kelly	Kelly's freestyle at Funk Flex on Hot 97		
Sep 3, 2018	"Rap Devil"	Machine Gun Kelly	Eminem	Eminem's "Not Alike"		
Sep 14, 2018	"Killshot"	Eminem	Machine Gun Kelly, P. Diddy	Kelly's "Rap Devil"		
Sep 15, 2018	"Intocable"	Anuel AA	Cosculluela, La Taína		Widely criticized due to its profanity and remarks about homosexuality and HIV/AIDS patients. Refers to model and television host La Taína as a "pig" for her HIV-positive status. Due to the public backlash, Anuel AA's concert at the Coliseum of Puerto Rico was canceled by his production staff and main producer Paco López. Anuel AA later issued an apology.	
Sep 19, 2018	"Love Tap"	Bizarre	Joe Budden and Jay Electronica	Electronica's comments about Eminem's "Killshot" and the alleged involvement of Diddy in the murder of Tupac Shakur, as well as the sobriety of Budden		
Nov 9, 2018	"Arrest the President"	Ice Cube	Donald Trump		Refers to accusations Trump colluded with Russia to win the 2016 Presidential election and that Trump administration policies affect African-Americans.	
Jan 28, 2019	"Don Queen"	Tory Lanez	Don Q, Dream Doll, Joyner Lucas, Royce Da 5'9"	"I'm Not Joyner"		
Feb 2, 2019	"Barbie Goin Bad"	Nicki Minaj	Drake and Meek Mill	Meek Mill collaborating with Drake on "Going Bad".	Minaj and Drake had recently unfollowed each other on Instagram, rumored to be because of his reunification with Mill. Minaj released a music video of her song "Hard White" which featured a dismembered scorpion, in reference to Drake's 2018 album, Scorpion.	
Mar 15, 2019	"Sally Walker"	Iggy Azalea	Bhad Bhabie	Bhad Bhabie throwing a drink at Iggy Azalea at Cardi B's party		
Jul 17, 2019	"Afilando Los Cuchillos"	Residente, Bad Bunny, ILe	Ricardo Rosselló and members of his cabinet	Leaking of hundreds of pages of a group chat on Telegram, known as Telegramgate.	The artists accuse Rosselló of corruption, homophobia, and incompetence. Although it is a protest song, Pitchfork describes it as a diss track.	
Jul 31, 2019	"Oppressed"	Rocky Badd	Stunna Girl, Cuban Doll, Molly Brazy	The Cage Incident, when Rocky Badd and her manager were ambushed by Stunna Girl, Cuban Doll, and their associates and forced into a dog cage	Rappers Cuban Doll, Stunna Girl, and their respective associates were allegedly involved in the luring of Rocky Badd and her manager to a fake Los Angeles booking. This alleged setup culminated in what was later dubbed "The Cage Incident," in which Rocky was reportedly assaulted and robbed.	
Aug 9, 2019	"Hot Girl Summer"	Megan Thee Stallion featuring Nicki Minaj and Ty Dolla Sign	Drake and Meek Mill	Minaj and Drake unfollowing each other on Instagram, Drake reuniting with Minaj's ex-boyfriend Meek Mill, and Drake bringing out Cardi B at OVO Fest	Minaj previously took shots at "Barbie Goin Bad", a remix of Meek Mill's song "Going Bad".	
December 9–19, 2019	"The Invitation" "Pray For Him" "The Invitation Canceled"	Nick Cannon featuring Suge Knight , Hitman Holla, Charlie Clips, Prince Eazy, and Conceited	Eminem	Eminem's feud with Cannon's ex-wife Mariah Carey ten years earlier, and Eminem's song "Lord Above" which disses Cannon	All three songs were widely disliked by the public. Eminem responded on Twitter with two tweets instead of another track.	
Jan 9, 2020	"ded sheeran (ed sheeran send) part 1"	Black Midi	Ed Sheeran		Drummer Morgan Simpson impersonates Sheeran and accuses him of stealing his drumsticks.	
May 1, 2020	"Say So"	Doja Cat featuring Nicki Minaj	AllegedlyBeyoncé and Wendy Williams		In the "Savage" remix, Beyoncé raps, "If you wanna see some real ass, baby, here's your chance." Minaj allegedly takes shots at Beyoncé and responds with the line "That real ass ain't keep your nigga home," referring to Jay-Z's affair, which was the topic of Beyoncé's sixth album. The line was also rumored to be directed at Wendy Williams, but was debunked by Minaj herself.	
Sep 25, 2020	"Sorry But I Had To..."	Tory Lanez	Megan Thee Stallion, Lil Ju, Asian Doll, Dream Doll, JoJo, J. R. Smith, Bun B, Chance The Rapper, Masika, Kalysha	"On Ya Head"		
Sep 25, 2020	"Money Over Fallouts"	Tory Lanez	Megan Thee Stallion, HotNewHipHop, Kehlani, Kaash Paige			
Sep 25, 2020	"Friends Become Strangers"	Tory Lanez	Megan Thee Stallion			
Sep 25, 2020	"The Most High"	Tory Lanez	Tal			
Sep 25, 2020	"Look How GOD Works"	Tory Lanez	Megan Thee Stallion			
Sep 25, 2020	"Queen and Slim"	Tory Lanez	Megan Thee Stallion			
Jun 25, 2020	"Had Enough"	G-Eazy	Halsey	"You Should Be Sad"	Halsey called out a fan at her concert for saying her ex's name. Later on she said that her relationship with G-Eazy was an abusive one.	
Nov 20, 2020	"Shots Fired"	Megan Thee Stallion	Tory Lanez	Lanez shooting Megan Thee Stallion in both her feet	Amid the controversy surrounding Lanez and MTS, Lanez released the album Daystar, in which he denies being involved in the shooting.	
Dec 16, 2020	"How To Rob (Remix)"	CupcakKe	Sada Baby, Lady Gaga, Migos, Offset, Wiz Khalifa, Tory Lanez, Too $hort, Young M.A., Lizzo, Lil Baby, Cardi B, Doja Cat, Sukihana, Lil Durk, City Girls, Megan Thee Stallion, 6ix9ine, DaBaby, Lil Kim, Chief Keef, G Herbo, Latto, Flo Milli, and DreamDoll		A remake of 50 Cent's 1999 diss track "How To Rob", dissing around 20 people.	
Dec 18, 2020	"DIV"	Lady Leshurr	Ivorian Doll	"Daily Duppy"	Ivorian Doll had sent a diss track Lady Leshurr's way earlier that year. This resulted in the Birmingham rapper releasing "DIV" on YouTube on Ivorian Doll's birthday, with the title of Ivorian Doll's track IVD rearranged to DIV, a British slang term for a "foolish person".	
Feb 5, 2021	"Kill All Rats"	Griselda	6ix9ine		Directed at 6ix9ine due to him feuding with Griselda member Benny the Butcher.	
Feb 19, 2021	"ZAZA"	6ix9ine	Lil Durk, Meek Mill		6ix9ine references Pooh Shiesty's "Back in Blood" in a mocking fashion and speaks about King Von, late friend of Lil Durk.	
Feb 23, 2021	"Let The Bad Times Roll"	The Offspring	Donald Trump			
May 14, 2021	"Seeing Green"	Nicki Minaj	Megan Thee Stallion			
Jun 11, 2021	"Thot Shit"	Megan Thee Stallion	Ben Shapiro, James P. Bradley	Conservative criticisms of WAP		
Sep 3, 2021	"7am On Bridle Path"	Drake	Kanye West	Longtime feud, and Certified Lover Boy vs Donda release battle.	Drake dissed West on Trippie Redd's "Betrayal." West also posted Drake's address on his Instagram page a week and a half before Certified Lover Boy's release.	
Sep 4, 2021 (Leaked)	"Life of the Party"	Kanye West featuring André 3000	Drake	Longtime feud, and Certified Lover Boy vs Donda release battle.	Leaked by Drake on his Sound 42 SiriusXM radio show. West later released the song without the diss verse, replacing it with the original verse he had recorded of him talking about his childhood and family.	
Nov 12, 2021	"All Too Well (10 Minute Version)"	Taylor Swift	Jake Gyllenhaal		In the 2021 re-recordings Taylor makes "All Too Well" a 10-minute song accompanied by a short film starring Sadie Sink and Dylan O'Brien as a similar couple.	
Feb 22, 2022	"AHHH HA"	Lil Durk	YoungBoy Never Broke Again	NBA Youngboy dissing the late rapper King Von on Bring The Hook		
Feb 22, 2022	"I Hate YoungBoy"	YoungBoy Never Broke Again	Lil Durk, India Royale, Gucci Mane, Lil Baby, Boosie Badazz, Apple Music	"AHHH HA" by Lil Durk		
Mar 3, 2022	BZRP Music Sessions #49	Residente	J Balvin	The boycott of J Balvin at the 22nd Annual Latin Grammy Awards, and his public declarations about 2021 Colombian protests	Freestyle session produced by Argentine Bizarrap	
Aug 12, 2022	"The Black Slim Shady"	The Game	Eminem			
Sep 29, 2022	"Bothered"	Akbar V	Cardi B			
Oct 22, 2022	"Sell Out"	TwoSet Violin	Blackpink, YG Entertainment	"Shut Down"	The track has many interpretations, some fans seeing the parody as a musical commentary, others that it was a "harsh" critique of Blackpink, and several that it was a critique of YG Entertainment.	
Nov 4, 2022	"Psycho Bitch"	Thalía	Tommy Mottola	Mottola's alleged infidelity		
Jan 11, 2023	"Shakira: Bzrp Music Sessions, Vol. 53"	Bizarrap and Shakira	Gerard Piqué and Clara Chía Martí	Piqué's infidelity		
Jan 12, 2023	"Flowers"	Miley Cyrus	Liam Hemsworth			
Feb 24, 2023	"TQG"	Karol G and Shakira	Anuel AA and Gerard Piqué	Pique's and Anuel's infidelity		
Mar 3, 2023	"Red Ruby Da Sleeze"	Nicki Minaj	Megan Thee Stallion and Latto			
Apr 21, 2023	"Put It on da Floor"	Latto	Ice Spice			
Jul 21, 2023	"Butterfly Ku"	Ice Spice	Latto	"Put It On Da Floor"		
Jul 21, 2023	"How High"	Ice Spice	Latto	"Put It On Da Floor"		
Jul 25, 2023	"Last Laugh"	Ceechynaa	OG Niki			
Aug 8, 2023	"Kickback"	Melle Mel	Eminem	Eminem's comments on the Ez Mil track "Realest"	Melle Mel later apologized and retracted his diss track. It has been dubbed one of the "worst pieces of music of 2023."	
Aug 15, 2023	"Meltdown"	Travis Scott featuring Drake	Pharrell Williams, Pusha T, Timothée Chalamet		Drake's long-standing feud with Pharrell and Pusha T continues, while he also takes shots at Timothée Chalamet after the actor went public with his relationship with Travis Scott's ex, Kylie Jenner	
Oct 13, 2023	"Fine as Can Be"	Offset featuring Latto	Ice Spice	"How High" and "Butterfly Ku"		
Oct 13, 2023	"Thunder y Lightning"	Bad Bunny	J Balvin			
Dec 8, 2023	"FTCU"	Nicki Minaj	Megan Thee Stallion, Cardi B			
Dec 8, 2023	"Fallin 4 U"	Nicki Minaj	Latto	"Put It On Da Floor" and "Put It On Da Floor Again"		
Dec 10, 2023	"Feliz Navidad 8"	Arcángel	Anuel AA, Ozuna, DJ Luian, Rochy RD	Anuel ending his business relationship with his longtime manager Frabián Eli, who is Arcángel's brother-in-law	Arcángel calls Anuel a "snitch" and criticizes him for being escorted by federal agents while boasting about being "real". He mentions Anuel's daughter and her relationship with rapper 6ix9ine, and mocks the loss of his Reebok contract.	
Dec 17, 2023	"Glock, Glock, Glock"	Anuel AA	Arcángel	"Feliz Navidad 8"	Mentions that without Bad Bunny, Arcángel cannot make a hit single.	
Dec 18, 2023	"El Narcan"	Arcángel	Anuel AA	"Glock, Glock, Glock"	Claims that Anuel has substance abuse issues.	
Dec 19, 2023	"Arcángel Es Chota"	Anuel AA	Arcángel, Karol G, Cosculluela	"El Narcan"	Mentions Arcángel's arrest in 2019 for domestic battery. Responding to Arcángel through an Instagram post, Anuel claims that nobody noticed that he released his album Sentimiento, Elegancia y Más Maldad, adding that "(he's) waiting for Bad Bunny to collaborate with him to revive his career."	
Dec 23, 2023	"3-0"	Arcángel	Anuel AA, Yailin La Más Viral	"Arcángel Es Chota" and Anuel's post on Instagram	Arcángel mentions Anuel's ex-partner Yailin La Más Viral and defends Karol G and Feid.	
Jan 4, 2024	"Last Laugh (Remix)"	Ceechyna featuring NLE Choppa	OG Niki			
Jan 8, 2024	"Dat A Dat"	Stefflon Don	Jada Kingdom			
Jan 26, 2024	"Hiss"	Megan Thee Stallion	Nicki Minaj, Drake, Kenneth Petty, Pardison Fontaine, and Tory Lanez	"Circo Loco", "FTCU", "Red Ruby da Sleeze"		
Jan 29, 2024	"Big Foot"	Nicki Minaj	Megan Thee Stallion	"Hiss"		
Jan 29, 2024	"Think U The Shit (Fart)"	Ice Spice	Latto		Ice Spice's "Pretty Girl" music video was in the background of one of Latto's TikTok videos, a snippet of a diss directed at Ice Spice.	
Feb 9, 2024	"Sunday Service"	Latto	Ice Spice, Nicki Minaj	"Think U The Shit (Fart)", "Fallin 4 U"		
Mar 22, 2024	"Like That"	Metro Boomin, Future featuring Kendrick Lamar	Drake, J. Cole	"First Person Shooter"	Kendrick Lamar's vehement rejection of J. Cole's allusion to the informal, oft-used "Big 3" label that included Drake, Kendrick, and J Cole. Kendrick's response initiated the full-blown escalation of Drake and Kendrick's long-simmering feud.	
Apr 5, 2024	"7 Minute Drill"	J. Cole	Kendrick Lamar	"Like That"	J. Cole later apologized for the diss and took it off music streaming services a week later.	
Apr 12, 2024	"Tender"	Quavo	Chris Brown	"Freak"		
Apr 13, 2024 (leaked); Apr 19, 2024 (Official)	"Push Ups"	Drake	Kendrick Lamar, Metro Boomin, Future, Rick Ross, The Weeknd	"Like That" and other songs from We Don't Trust You and We Still Don't Trust You		
Apr 13, 2024	"Champagne Moments"	Rick Ross	Drake	"Push Ups"		
Apr 19, 2024	"Weakest Link"	Chris Brown	Quavo	"Tender"		
Apr 19, 2024	"Taylor Made Freestyle"	Drake	Kendrick Lamar	"Like That", follow up to "Push Ups"	Features Drake using AI voices of 2Pac and Snoop Dogg. Pulled from platforms a few days later following a threatened lawsuit by 2Pac's estate.	
Apr 21, 2024	"Like That (Remix)"	Metro Boomin, Future, ¥$	Drake, J. Cole	"False Prophets"	Disses rappers Drake and J. Cole in response to Ye and Drake's ongoing feud and J. Cole's perceived disses on his 2016 song "False Prophets".	
Apr 22, 2024	"Over Hoes & Bitches	Quavo featuring Takeoff	Chris Brown	"Weakest Link"	Takeoff feature recorded before the feud.	
Apr 26, 2024	"OKAY"	JT	Sukihana			
Apr 30, 2024	"Euphoria"	Kendrick Lamar	Drake	"Push Ups", "Taylor Made Freestyle", "7 Minute Drill"		
May 3, 2024	"6:16 in LA"	Kendrick Lamar	Drake	"Taylor Made Freestyle"	Co-produced by Jack Antonoff, who frequently produces Taylor Swift's albums with her.	
May 3, 2024	"Family Matters"	Drake	Kendrick Lamar, The Weeknd, Rick Ross, Metro Boomin, A$AP Rocky, Pharrell Williams, Future, Kanye West	"Euphoria", "6:16 in LA"	Attacks multiple artists, with main target being Kendrick Lamar. Drake accuses Lamar of domestic abuse against his partner Whitney Alford and that one of Lamar's children was actually fathered by his business partner Dave Free.	
May 3, 2024	"Buried Alive Interlude, Pt. 2"	Drake	Kendrick Lamar		A short parody remix of "Buried Alive Interlude" from Drake's 2011 album Take Care, which featured Lamar	
May 3, 2024	"Meet the Grahams"	Kendrick Lamar	Drake	"Family Matters" released less than an hour prior to Meet the Grahams.	By addressing each member of Drake's family, Lamar accuses Drake of sex trafficking and being a sexual predator. He also alleges that Drake has a secret daughter that he has abandoned.	
May 4, 2024	"Not Like Us"	Kendrick Lamar	Drake		Accuses Drake of paedophilia and running a sex trafficking ring with members of OVO sound. Further attacks Drake's standing in hip-hop, calling him a "colonizer".	
May 5, 2024	"BBL Drizzy"	Metro Boomin	Drake		An entirely instrumental track with a sample mocking Drake. Metro Boomin announced that whoever wrote and recorded the best verse over the instrumental would receive $10,000 and a free beat. Drake would later rap over the instrumental on Sexyy Red's song, "U My Everything".	
May 5, 2024	"The Heart Part 6"	Drake	Kendrick Lamar	"Meet the Grahams" and "Not Like Us"		
May 8, 2024	"Cocaine"	Sukihana	JT, Lil Uzi Vert	"OKAY"	Scathing diss track directed at JT and her boyfriend Lil Uzi Vert.	
May 10, 2024	"OKAY (Extended Mix)"	JT	Sukihana	"Cocaine"		
May 10, 2024	"Freeway's Revenge"	The Game	Rick Ross	Rick Ross attacking Drake on social media during the latter's feud with Kendrick Lamar		
May 11, 2024	"Bitch Duh (remix)"	Dreezy featuring BIA, KenTheMen, and Lakeyah	Cardi B			
May 12, 2024	"Pick A Side"	King Combs	50 Cent		King Combs defending his father Sean "Diddy" Combs against intense public trolling and criticism from 50 Cent.	
May 31, 2024	"Wanna Be" (remix)	GloRilla, Megan Thee Stallion featuring Cardi B	Bia			
Jun 1, 2024	"Sue Meee?"	Bia	Cardi B		Bia alleged Cardi B cheated on her husband Offset, using his 2023 social media posts as cover art. Bia claimed Cardi B copied her flow, which escalated after Cardi B appeared to address the accusation on her "Wanna Be" remix.	
Jun 14, 2024	"Double Life"	Pharrell Williams	Drake	"Meltdown"	While the song is describing the Despicable Me character Gru, there is speculation it is also a diss track towards Drake.	
Jun 28, 2024	"Rattle"	Megan Thee Stallion	Nicki Minaj			
Jul 19, 2024	"Intro (Hope)"	JT	Cardi B	Cardi B calling JT a "lapdog" and telling her to "go fetch" after being featured on the Super Freaky Girl Remix	JT disses Cardi B by commenting on rumours of Cardi inserting a bottle into her body based on a video circulating in 2018.	
Jul 19, 2024	"Yoshinoya"	Childish Gambino	Drake	Drake calling the hit record "This is America" overrated and over-awarded, a few months after Glover revealed it was originally a Drake diss record		
Jul 26, 2024	"BB Belt"	Ice Spice	Cardi B			
Aug 9, 2024	"S/O to Me"	Latto	Ice Spice, Nicki Minaj	"Think U The Shit (Fart)", "Fallin 4 U"		
Aug 23, 2024	"Dumb & Poetic"	Sabrina Carpenter	Joshua Bassett, Shawn Mendes	Sabrina's relationships with Joshua and Shawn		
Dec 5, 2024	"Peggy"	Ceechynaa	Sym Worldd		Sym Worldd allegedly believed that Ceechynaa's track "Last Laugh" was directed at her.	
Jan 13, 2025 (leaked)	"Smack You"	Eminem	Ja Rule, Suge Knight		Actually recorded c. 2003.	
Jan 18, 2025	"250K"	Gera MX	Santa Fe Klan	Altercation that took place in December 2024 at a private event hosted by Spotify	Title alludes to the figure of 250,000 Mexican pesos that is mentioned on social media as related to the personal and family life of Santa Fe Klan. At the very end of the track Gera MX includes actual audio recordings of Santa Fe Klan screaming and losing his temper during the altercation.	
Mar 10, 2025	"Tiradera V3"	Natanael Cano	Peso Pluma, Nicki Nicole, Junior H, Ovi	Alleged "betrayal" by Peso Pluma, Junior H, and Ovi, whom Cano says he inspired	The track suggests that Nicki "cheated" on Peso Pluma with Cano.	
Jun 17, 2025	"So Be It"	Clipse, Pharrell Williams	Travis Scott	Travis Scott criticized for playing the album Utopia to Pusha T and Pharrell Williams while hiding the diss verse performed by Drake aimed at Pharrell in "Meltdown", essentially making them work on an album that was attacking them.	On a beat produced by Pharrell, Pusha T takes aim at Travis Scott, referencing his breakup with Kylie Jenner, saying that Travis cried in front of him and that he has videos of it. He questions Travis's loyalty for allowing Drake to diss his own mentor Kanye, and urges Metro Boomin to play 'Like That', a diss track aimed at his friend Drake.	
Jun 20, 2025	"Outside"	Cardi B	Offset			
Jul 10, 2025	"Friendly Fire"	Skepta	Joyner Lucas			
Jul 15, 2025	"Nobody Cares"	Joyner Lucas	Skepta			
Sep 12, 2025	"Brianna"	GloRilla	Young Thug, Mariah the Scientist	A leaked phone call while in jail between Young Thug and his girlfriend Mariah the Scientist, with Thug insulting GloRilla's appearance		
Sep 17, 2025	"Tired of Being Groomed"	Dave Blunts	Kanye West			
Sep 19, 2025	"Magnet"	Cardi B	JT, Lil Uzi Vert, Offset, Ice Spice	"BB Belt", "Intro (Hope)"		
Sep 19, 2025	"Pretty & Petty"	Cardi B	Bia, Sean Combs	"Sue Meee?"	Takes shots at Bia's appearance and her commercial success. Cardi talks about Bia's relationship with Diddy's son Justin Combs, and that they "combed that little kitty out", alleging that Bia was gangbanged at a Diddy party. Cardi ends the song telling Bia to never mention her kids in her songs again.	
Sep 22, 2025	"Pordiosero"	C-Kan	Millonario			
Sep 24, 2025	"Tacos de Perra"	Millonario	C-Kan	"Pordiosero"		
Sep 25, 2025	"Pozole"	C-Kan	Millonario	"Tacos de Perra"		
Sep 26, 2025	"Tit for Tat"	Tate McRae	The Kid Laroi	"A Cold Play"		
Oct 3, 2025	"Actually Romantic"	Taylor Swift	Charli XCX, Kim Kardashian	"Sympathy Is a Knife"	Upon its release, fans quickly speculated that "Sympathy is a Knife" was about Taylor Swift's relationship with Matty Healy. Taylor responds to this by saying that it's ironic how Charli thinks so much about her despite her apparent hatred.	
Oct 4, 2025	"No Hook"	JT	Cardi B	"Magnet"		
Oct 6, 2025	"Keep Coming"	JT	Cardi B, Hennessy Carolina			
Oct 30, 2025	"KO”	NLE Choppa	YoungBoy Never Broke Again			
Oct 31, 2025	"No Sweat"	Offset	Stefon Diggs, Cardi B	"Magnet", "Man of Your Word", "What's Goin On", "Shower Tears", "Outside"		
Nov 5, 2025	"Pretty Privilege"	Ice Spice	Nicki Minaj (alleged), Cardi B, Cleotrapa, Stunna Sandy	"Magnet"		
Dec 1, 2025	"Death Row Records Stole From Me"	Daz Dillinger	Snoop Dogg		Accuses Snoop Dogg of removing him from Death Row Records after he allegedly refused to sign over his publishing rights and Dogg Pound logo to Snoop.	
Dec 25, 2025	"Squatter's Rights"	Maino, Fabolous, Jim Jones, Dave East	50 Cent		Accused 50 Cent of not paying rent and being "squatters" in their recording studio. 50 Cent further escalated tensions by posting alleged audio of the building's landlord.	
Dec 29, 2025	"Girl, Get Up"	Doechii	DJ Akademiks, Adin Ross, Kanye West			
Jan 16, 2026	"Stole Ya Flow"	A$AP Rocky	Drake	"Family Matters"		
Feb 22, 2026	"War (Snippet)"	T.I.	50 Cent		50 Cent allegedly "ducking" T.I., which escalated when 50 Cent trolled T.I. and his family on social media.	
Feb 23, 2026	"The Right One"	T.I.	50 Cent			
Feb 24, 2026	"Made Man"	King	50 Cent		King defends his mother Tiny Harris, following a series of disrespectful comments and social media posts by 50 Cent.	
Feb 25, 2026	"It’s Problems"	T.I.	50 Cent			
Feb 26, 2026	"Lessons"	T.I.	50 Cent			
Feb 26, 2026	"Sayless"	King	50 Cent			
Feb 26, 2026	"Ms. Jackson"	Domani	50 Cent		Domani fires back at 50 Cent after he keeps trolling Domani's family.	
Mar 5, 2026	"No One Told Us"	50 Cent, Leon Thomas III	T.I.			
Mar 5, 2026	"Trauma Bond"	T.I.	50 Cent	”No One Told Us”		
Mar 5, 2026	"Droptop"	King	50 Cent	”No One Told Us”		
Mar 6, 2026	"Pu$y"	Domani	50 Cent	”No One Told Us”		
Mar 6, 2026	"No More Tricks, No More Tries"	50 Cent, Max B	Maino, Fabolous, Jim Jones, Dave East			
Mar 8, 2026	"Many Men Freestyle"	Papoose	50 Cent		Papoose dissed 50 Cent for not responding to disses from Fabolous, Jim Jones, Maino, and Dave East in a simmering social media feud.	
Mar 11, 2026	"Bleed Like Us"	Maino	50 Cent	"No More Tricks, No More Tries"		
Mar 11, 2026	"Agent Provocateur"	Papoose	50 Cent			
Mar 16, 2026	"The Algorithm"	Maino	50 Cent, Joe Budden, DJ Akademiks, Wack 100, Adam22, DJ Vlad			
Apr 10, 2026	"Crash Dummy"	Gucci Mane	Pooh Shiesty, Big30		Gucci Mane was kidnapped, robbed, and forced to sign a contract release with a gun to his head.	
Apr 10, 2026	"W.Y.F.L."	Remy Ma	Papoose, Claressa Shields		Papoose and Shields allegedly had an affair which followed public cheating accusations and a messy separation between Remy Ma and Papoose. Remy Ma also dismissed claims that Papoose was responsible for her success.	
Apr 13, 2026	"W.Y.F.L."	Ms Hustle	Remy Ma		Addressed rumors surrounding Remy’s personal life, alleging that Remy Ma had been trying to blackball Ms Hustle behind the scenes since their fallout.	
May 3, 2026	"Chump"	Agallah	Busta Rhymes		Accusations of betrayal, disrespect, and financial issues. Alleging that Busta used him and owes him money.	
May 15, 2026	"Make Them Pay"	Drake	Kendrick Lamar, DJ Khaled, Rick Ross, J. Cole, Pharrell Williams, Pusha T			
May 15, 2026	"Whisper My Name"	Drake	Playboi Carti, Jay-Z			
May 15, 2026	"Janice STFU"	Drake	Jay-Z, Joe Budden			
May 15, 2026	"Burning Bridges"	Drake	ASAP Rocky	"Stole Ya Flow"		
May 15, 2026	"National Treasures"	Drake	DeMar DeRozan			
May 15, 2026	"B's on the Table"	Drake, 21 Savage	Lucian Grainge, Universal Music Group			
May 15, 2026	"2 Hard 4 Radio"	Drake	Mustard			
May 15, 2026	"Make Them Remember"	Drake	Kendrick Lamar, LeBron James, Dr. Dre, J. Cole			
May 15, 2026	"Firm Friends"	Drake	ASAP Rocky			
May 29, 2026	"Gimme Dat"	Latto	Cardi B			
May 30, 2026	"Roots Picnic Freestyle"	Jay-Z	Drake, Kanye West, Kenneth Petty, Nicki Minaj			
Jul 3, 2026	"wedidit"	Ken Carson, Playboi Carti	Drake	"Whisper My Name"		
Jul 9, 2026	"The Aroma"	Fat Joe, Jadakiss, Stove God Cooks	38 Spesh			
Jul 16, 2026	"Minks in Harlem"	Nino Man	38 Spesh			
Jul 23, 2026	"Warning Shots"	Klass Murda	Jim Jones, Nino Man, Trust Mula, Chunk Bizza, and Hue Hef	Chunk Bizza “No Response”, Nino Man “Minks in Harlem”, Chunk Bizza “Dinner in Rochester”, Trust Mula “Animal State of Mind”, Hue Hef “Trust”		
Jul 25, 2026	"Fools Mate"	38 Spesh	Fat Joe, Jadakiss, Jim Jones			
Aug 14, 2026	"Wanna Go"	Remy Ma	Claressa Shields			
Aug 27, 2026	"9 Bitches"	Ken Carson, Apollored1	Nine Vicious	Nine Vicious openly dissed label mate Opiumbaby, who is close with both ApolloRed1 and Ken Carson		
Aug 27, 2026	"Vamp City"	Ken Carson, OsamaSon	Nine Vicious		Vicious was upset at ApolloRed1 for working with OsamaSon rather than himself and asked to remove OsamaSon's works. He also openly dissed OsamaSon.	
Sep 4, 2026	"On Nothing"	Yeat	Travis Scott		Scott removed Yeat's song from JackBoys 2 and gave Young Thug an ultimatum to either remove his or Yeat's verse from "Eaters" on Slime Language 3. Thug removed Yeat's verse, causing Yeat to send this response. Many believe that Scott was upset at Yeat for working with his ex-wife Kylie Jenner.	
Sep 11, 2026	"Jezebel"	Papoose	Remy Ma			
Sep 25, 2026	"Rem The Pen"	Remy Ma	Nicki Minaj			
Sep 25, 2026	"Why I Get Married?"	Remy Ma	Papoose			

== YouTube diss clips ==
Although they were created outside the music industry, these songs made by YouTubers found significant audiences, RIAA certifications, and news coverage beyond the YouTube platform.

Date released	Song title	Artist(s)	Target(s)	Response to (if applicable)	Notes
Nov 26, 2010	"Pokémon Theme Song REVENGE!"	Smosh	The Pokémon Company, Nintendo, and its copyright holders		Mocks the copyright dispute over the 2007 removal of Smosh's original Pokémon theme song video.
Apr 19, 2013	"RuPaulogize"	Willam Belli, Sharon Needles	RuPaul		Belli's response to being cut from RuPaul's Drag Race All Stars season 1 prior to filming.
Jun 16, 2016	"KSI (Your the Gayest Guy)"	Rucka Rucka Ali	KSI		Response to KSI getting Rucka Rucka Ali's video deleted.
Apr 4, 2017	"I Didn't Hit Her"	RiceGum	The Gabbie Show		Response to assault allegations against RiceGum by Gabbie Hanna.
May 30, 2017	"It's Everyday Bro"	Jake Paul featuring Team 10	Alissa Violet		Ignited a wave of feuds that played out through diss tracks.
Jun 3, 2017	"The Fall of Jake Paul"	Logan Paul featuring Why Don't We	Jake Paul	Jake Paul's "Logang Sucks"	The largest of the feuds incited by Jake Paul's "It's Everyday Bro."
Jun 9, 2017	"It's Every Night Sis"	RiceGum featuring Alissa Violet	Jake Paul	Jake Paul's "It's Everyday Bro"	
Jul 23, 2017	"God Church"	RiceGum	Tanner Fox	"We Do It Best"	
Aug 5, 2017	"YouTube Stars Diss Track"	Jake Paul	The general press		Part diss track, part musical apology video.
Aug 7, 2017	"Drama"	Behzinga	KSI		
Aug 8, 2017	"KSI Sucks"	Wroetoshaw	KSI		
Aug 11, 2017	"Sidemen Diss Track"	Deji Olatunji	Behzinga, Vikkstar123, Miniminter, TBJZL, Zerkaa, and Wroetoshaw		
Aug 12, 2017	"Earthquake"	KSI featuring RiceGum	Behzinga	"Drama"	
Aug 12, 2017	"KSI's Little Brother"	Miniminter	Deji Olatunji	"Sidemen Diss Track"	
Aug 13, 2017	"Little Boy"	KSI	Wroetoshaw	"KSI Sucks"	
Aug 15, 2017	"The End"	Vikkstar123	Deji Olatunji	"Sidemen Diss Track"	
Aug 18, 2017	"Finished"	Behzinga	KSI and RiceGum	"Earthquake"	
Aug 19, 2017	"KSI Exposed"	Wroetoshaw	KSI	"Little Boy"	
Aug 20, 2017	"Diss Track ED"	NetNobody	KSI		
Aug 20, 2017	"Ungrateful"	Deji Olatunji	Miniminter	"KSI's Little Brother"	
Aug 24, 2017	"Two Birds One Stone"	KSI	Joe Weller and Wroetoshaw	"KSI Exposed"	
Sep 4, 2017	"You'll Float Too"	DashieXP	Pennywise		
Sep 8, 2017	"Adam's Apple"	KSI	NetNobody	"Diss Track ED"	
Sep 8, 2017	"Bend the Knee"	NetNobody	KSI	"Adam's Apple"	
Oct 3, 2017	"Asian Jake Paul"	iDubbbz featuring Boyinaband	RiceGum		Response to Ricegum's many controversies and perceived narcissism.
Oct 10, 2017	"Frick Da Police"	Ricegum	iDubbbz	iDubbbz's "Asian Jake Paul"	Ricegum's response was received notoriously poorly.
2018	"Solitaire"	Chris Webby	Lil Yachty		
Aug 17, 2018	"On Point"	KSI	Logan Paul		Part of the two entertainers' feud, released eight days before the white-collar amateur boxing match KSI vs. Logan Paul.
Aug 20, 2018	"Wasteman"	Deji Olatunji	Jake Paul		Promotion of their celebrity boxing match.
Aug 21, 2018	"Goodbye KSI"	Logan Paul	KSI		Part of the two entertainers' feud, in response to KSI's "On Point", and four days before the white-collar amateur boxing match KSI vs. Logan Paul.
Aug 24, 2018	"Ricegum Sucks"	Wroetoshaw	RiceGum		
Sep 20, 2018	"Yacht"	Gabi DeMartino	Haters and SSSniperWolf (alleged)		Response to DeMartino's haters, in particular Ariana Grande fans who accused her of copying Grande's style.
Oct 5, 2018	"Bitch Lasagna"	PewDiePie and Party in Backyard	T-Series		Part of the feud PewDiePie vs T-Series.
Nov 23, 2018	"Insecure"	Quadeca	KSI		
Nov 24, 2018	"Manchild"	Randolph	Deji Olatunji		
Nov 26, 2018	"Ran"	Deji Olatunji	Randolph	"Manchild"	
Nov 30, 2018	"Victory Speech"	Randolph	Deji Olatunji	"Ran"	
Dec 4, 2018	"Ares"	KSI	Quadeca	"Insecure"	
Dec 6, 2018	"Unforgivable"	Deji Olatunji featuring Crypt, Dax, and Jallow	KSI		
Jan 1, 2019	"Bye PewDiePie"	CarryMinati	PewDiePie		In the context of the PewDiePie vs T-Series competition.
Mar 31, 2019	"Congratulations"	PewDiePie, Boyinaband, RoomieOfficial	T-Series	T-Series surpassing PewDiePie in subscribers	Part of the feud PewDiePie vs T-Series.
Jun 5, 2020	"Yalgaar"	CarryMinati, Wily Frenzy			A response to "YouTube vs Tiktok the End" controversy.
Feb 14, 2021	"Coco"	PewDiePie	Cocomelon	Cocomelon surpassing PewDiePie in subscribers	The song's music video was taken down for violating community guidelines.
Aug 15, 2022	"KSI Diss Track"	Swarmz	KSI		Promoting their upcoming celebrity boxing match.
Jul 31, 2023	"Kingdom Come"	King Dotta	Ren		
Aug 5, 2023	"Dumb King Come"	Ren	King Dotta	"Kingdom Come"	
Jun 16, 2024	"Tom MacDonald Is a Nazi"	Mac Lethal	Tom MacDonald		
Jan 31, 2025	"Lost Your Mind"	Deji Olatunji	FouseyTube		
Jan 7, 2026	"Rip ElAbrahaham"	Yolo Aventuras	ElAbrahaham		
