= Coco (PewDiePie song) =

2021 song by PewDiePie

Coco is a diss track made by YouTuber PewDiePie in response to CoComelon nearing PewDiePie in subscribers on YouTube. Coco was removed from YouTube shortly after its release.

== Background ==
A few months before Coco's release, the YouTube channel CoComelon began to rapidly approach PewDiePie's subscriber count. This led PewDiePie to joke that he and T-Series would join forces to stop Cocomelon (referencing his past feud with T-Series), as well as tease a diss track. The children featured in the music video were hired through an agency.

CoComelon passed PewDiePie in subscribers on April 25, 2021.

== Composition ==
While mainly being a diss track against Cocomelon, the song also makes frequent references to rapper Tekashi 6ix9ine, calling 6ix9ine a "fucking snitch" and a "rainbow bitch". When asked why he dissed 6ix9ine, PewDiePie responded "I just don't like him".

PewDiePie would also diss author JK Rowling with the line "I'll spoil Harry Potter, wait, JK already did that", referencing transphobic Tweets made by JK Rowling that received a lot of backlash, as well as her past feud with PewDiePie.

== Removal from YouTube ==
Shortly after Coco's release, YouTube removed the song from their platform for violating their policies on harassment and cyberbullying. YouTube also stated it violated their policies on child safety due to PewDiePie appearing to swear in front of children. PewDiePie confirmed that a censored version of the song was played on the set.

The removal of Coco from YouTube generated backlash from PewDiePie's fans.
