= Bitch Lasagna =

2018 diss track by PewDiePie to T-Series

Single by PewDiePie and Party in Backyard
- Released: 5 October 2018
- Genre: Hip-hop
- Length: 2:14
- Label: Self-released
- Songwriter: Felix Kjellberg
- Producer: Party In Backyard

PewDiePie singles chronology
"Bitch Lasagna" (2018)	"Rewind Time" (2018)

Party in Backyard singles chronology
"Meme Theme" (2018)	"Bitch Lasagna" (2018)	"Rewind Time" (2018)

Audio sample
- file; help

Music video
- "Bitch Lasagna" on YouTube

"Bitch Lasagna" (stylized in all lowercase), originally named "T-Series Diss Track", is a song by Swedish YouTuber PewDiePie in collaboration with Dutch music producer Party in Backyard. The song satirizes Indian company and music label T-Series, as a response to predictions that T-Series would surpass PewDiePie in terms of subscriber count. The song was one of the first events in the PewDiePie vs T-Series competition, in which the two channels competed for the title of the most-subscribed YouTube channel.

The song was first released with an accompanying music video on 5 October 2018, and was renamed and re-released to music platforms on 6 November 2018. As of 28 August 2026 the song has accumulated over 328 million views on YouTube, making it the most-viewed video on PewDiePie's YouTube channel.

== Background and release ==
In 2018, the YouTube channel for Indian music label T-Series began rapidly gaining subscribers, approaching the subscriber count of Swedish YouTuber and web comedian PewDiePie, who at the time had the most-subscribed channel on YouTube. In response to this, PewDiePie declared a competition between him and T-Series. Fans, including celebrities and other YouTubers, showed their support for each channel by encouraging others to subscribe. During the competition, both channels gained a significant number of subscribers in a short amount of time, with PewDiePie gaining millions of subscribers each month. As one of his initial efforts to prevent T-Series from winning the competition, PewDiePie created a diss track against T-Series in collaboration with music producer Party in Backyard. The song, titled "Bitch Lasagna", was released on 5 October 2018 via YouTube.

For the rest of the competition, the two channels surpassed each other in subscriber count several times, sometimes for only a few hours. In May 2019, when T-Series overtook PewDiePie as the most-subscribed channel on the platform, (Note: T-Series remained the most-subscribed channel on the platform until May 2024, when it was succeeded by MrBeast.) PewDiePie declared T-Series the winner of the competition with a follow-up song, "Congratulations".

== Composition and lyrics ==
"Bitch Lasagna" is a hip hop diss track that is two minutes and fourteen seconds long. The title of the song references a viral Facebook Messenger screenshot, popularized on Reddit, in which an Indian man, in broken English, demands nude photos from a woman, and, when his messages go unanswered, calls her a "bitch lasagna". In the song, PewDiePie insults T-Series and their video content, makes references to contemporary Indian stereotypes and accuses the company of using subscriber bots to gain fake subscriptions. The Indian background of T-Series was also mocked, such as in the line "Your language sounds like it come [sic] from a mumble rap community", which have been described as racist by some media publications, as well as in a court ruling from the High Court of Delhi that sided with T-Series.

== Reception ==
As PewDiePie vs T-Series coverage grew in the mainstream media, news organizations covered "Bitch Lasagna" for its role in the feud. Vox accused the lyrics of containing "overt and implied racism," which they said pervaded PewDiePie's fans' support for his channel against T-Series.

On 10 April 2019, the song was banned in India as a result of PewDiePie releasing a second diss track against T-Series, "Congratulations". T-Series asserted the tracks were "defamatory, disparaging, insulting, and offensive" and that the songs contained "repeated comments... abusive, vulgar, and also racist in nature." The Delhi High Court granted the injunction against the two songs, noting that, in communication with T-Series after the release of "Bitch Lasagna", PewDiePie had apologized for posting the video and had "assured that he [was] not planning any more videos on the same line."

In August 2019, it was reported that T-Series and PewDiePie had settled their legal disputes outside of court.

On November 7, 2018, JusReign, a Canadian Indian YouTuber, released a video and song titled "In Defense of T-Series", in which he humorously criticized PewDiePie. On January 1, 2019, CarryMinati, an Indian YouTuber, launched a diss track titled "Bye PewDiePie", in which he also criticized PewDiePie.

== Charts ==
Chart (2018)	Peak position
UK Indie Breakers (OCC)	18

== See also ==
- PewDiePie videography
- List of diss tracks § YouTube
- List of viral music videos
- Ethnic joke
- Rage-baiting
- Anti-Indian sentiment
- Racism on the Internet
