= Minecraft Multiplayer Fun =

2010 YouTube video by PewDiePie

- Thumbnail of "Minecraft Multiplayer Fun"
- Starring: PewDiePie; Xebaz
- Release date: 2 October 2010
- Running time: 2:03
- Country: Sweden
- Languages: Swedish; English

"Minecraft Multiplayer Fun" is a 2010 YouTube video, noted for being the oldest video available for viewing on the PewDiePie channel. The video was uploaded by Felix Kjellberg, the owner of the channel, on 2 October 2010. Also featuring Xebaz, a friend of Kjellberg's, the video shows the two playing Minecraft, a sandbox video game. "Minecraft Multiplayer Fun" has been viewed more than 23 million times as of September 2026.

== Background and release ==
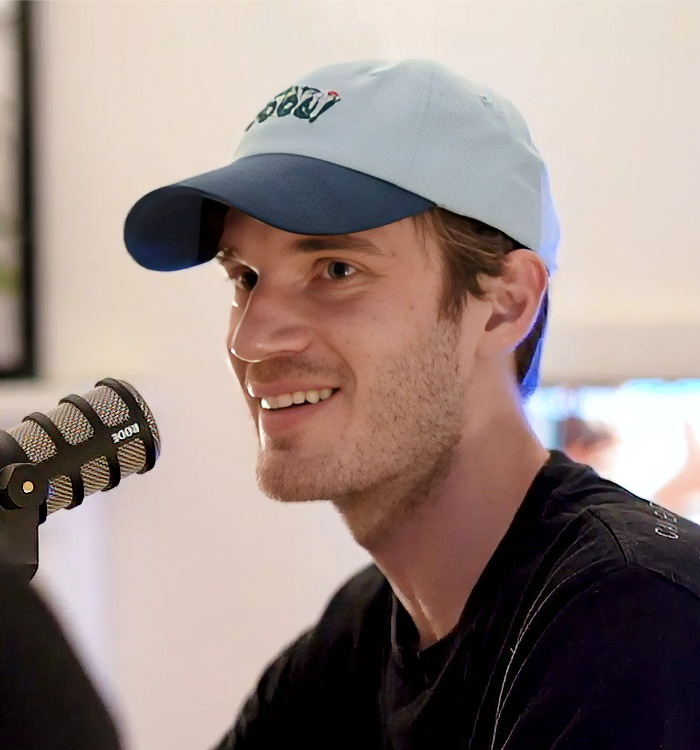
Felix Kjellberg (pictured in 2019) released the video in 2010.

Kjellberg registered his "PewDiePie" YouTube account on 29 April 2010, after forgetting the password to his old account. (Note: This "Pewdie" account briefly served as a 2nd channel from 2012 to 2014.) His first YouTube upload was a different Minecraft video, which he deleted and no longer has access to. Nonetheless, "Minecraft Multiplayer Fun" has been cited as Kjellberg's first video by various outlets. Kjellberg described his commentary at the time as 'shy', and stated "it was so weird to me, sitting alone in a room talking into a microphone. That was unheard of back at the time. No one really did it."

Released on 2 October 2010, the video is Kjellberg's oldest available for public viewing. The video was released while Minecraft was still in its alpha stage of development. The video's description reads: "My friend was going to show me something inside the building, somehow a zombie had spawn waiting for us in his minecart." The video features hearty laughter at the sight of the zombie getting stuck. The video features mainly Swedish off-screen commentary from Kjellberg and Xebaz, although there is occasional swearing in English. This is in contrast to the English he has primarily spoken in his later videos.

== Reception and legacy ==
"Minecraft Multiplayer Fun" has been viewed over 22 million times as of May 2024. The video itself has been cited as one that turned Kjellberg "into [a] huge YouTube star" by Business Insider, as well as one of the "10 most important videos in YouTube history" by Observer.

Despite Minecraft being particularly notable within the Let's Play community, which Kjellberg helped to popularize, he did not upload playthroughs of the game during early periods of the game's popularity. He stated in a video that "it felt like people were playing it just because it was popular, and not because they were actually [having fun] doing it." However, in 2019, Kjellberg began to regularly upload Minecraft gameplays on his channel; Polygon wrote that he began to play the game, in part because, "he feels that he is flexible enough to not have the game define his channel." The Verge cited one content strategist stating that Kjellberg was the top creator for the Minecraft keyword.

In a pinned comment made in response to people asking about Xebaz, Kjellberg said that "Sad reality is sometimes friendships don't last forever – doesn't mean it's anyone's fault or that something happened. Xebaz was such a great friend to have during this time, he was one of the few people who understood and shared my dreams with YouTube and supported it 1000%."

== See also ==
- PewDiePie videography
