= Congratulations (Roomie, PewDiePie, and Boyinaband song) =

2019 single by Roomie, PewDiePie, and Boyinaband

Single by PewDiePie, Roomie and Boyinaband
- Released: 31 March 2019
- Recorded: November 2018
- Genre: Satirical hip hop; synth-pop; pop rap
- Length: 4:08
- Label: Roomie
- Songwriters: David Brown; Joel Berghult; Felix Kjellberg
- Producers: Apollo V; Joel Berghult (add.)

PewDiePie singles chronology
"Rewind Time" (2018)	"Congratulations" (2019)	"Mine All Day" (2019)

Roomie singles chronology
"Own You" (2018)	"Congratulations" (2019)	"Roxanne/ Roxanne" (2020)

Boyinaband singles chronology
"Life Is Fun" (2018)	"Congratulations" (2019)

Music video
- "Congratulations" on YouTube

"Congratulations" is a song by YouTubers PewDiePie, Roomie and Boyinaband. The single was self-released on 31 March 2019 with an accompanying music video on YouTube as a response to T-Series surpassing PewDiePie as the most-subscribed YouTube channel. The music video is banned on YouTube in India. As of September 2026, the video on YouTube has over 241 million views, making it PewDiePie's second most-viewed video, his most viewed being his previous T-Series diss track, "Bitch Lasagna".

== Background ==
In mid-2018, the subscriber count of the Indian music video channel T-Series rapidly approached that of Swedish web comedian and Let's Player PewDiePie, who at the time was the most-subscribed YouTuber. As a response, PewDiePie fans and other YouTubers had shown their support for PewDiePie, while T-Series fans and other YouTubers had shown support for T-Series, in the PewDiePie vs T-Series competition. During the competition, both channels had been gaining a large number of subscribers at a rapid rate. The two channels had surpassed each other in subscriber count on a number of occasions in February, March, and April 2019.

== Composition and lyrics ==
"Congratulations" is an upbeat-sounding synth-pop/hip-hop diss track whose instrumentals are based on "Buckwild" by 2Virgins. In the music video, PewDiePie sarcastically congratulates and criticizes T-Series at the same time for achieving their early success by selling pirated songs and chairman Bhushan Kumar for alleged tax evasion (in reference to a Times of India article). He also mocks T-Series for sending him a cease and desist letter alleging that his actions and lyrics of "Bitch Lasagna" were defamatory, and also mentions the company's tax evasion scandal, collusions with the Mumbai mafia and #MeToo allegations.

The video also thanks his fans for sticking with him through his YouTube career, referencing past videos.

== Reception ==
Eight days after it was released, "Congratulations" was banned in India, alongside PewDiePie's earlier diss track, "Bitch Lasagna". The Delhi High Court granted an injunction against the two songs at the request of T-Series, who asserted the tracks were "defamatory, disparaging, insulting, and offensive" and that the songs contained "repeated comments ... abusive, vulgar, and also racist in nature." In their decision, the court noted that PewDiePie, in communication with T-Series after the release of "Bitch Lasagna", had apologized after posting the first video and had "assured that he [was] not planning any more video[s] on the same line." In August 2019, it was reported that T-Series and PewDiePie had settled their legal disputes outside of court.

== Music video ==
A music video for the song was released the same day. The video was previously recorded in November 2018 in anticipation of T-Series surpassing his subscriber count. It shows PewDiePie, Roomie, and Boyinaband throwing a party inside a room adorned with party decorations, balloons, champagne, and a cake that imitates the T-Series logo. They sing and dance congratulating T-Series in a tongue-in-cheek manner. At the bridge of the song after the second verse, PewDiePie gives a "Thank You" to all his fans and subscribers for supporting his career and gives a "Brofist" to the camera, before the video cuts to the final chorus of the song with a scene showing PewDiePie, Roomie, and Boyinaband launching fireworks outside in the night. The video ends with MrBeast giving a slow clap to the song. MrBeast would go onto surpass T-Series as the most-subscribed YouTube channel in 2024, "avenging" Pewdiepie.

As of January 2025, the video on YouTube has over 237 million views, PewDiePie's second-most-viewed video behind the previously released "Bitch Lasagna".

== Charts ==
Chart (2019)	Peak position
New Zealand Hot Singles (Recorded Music NZ)	27
Scottish Singles Sales (Official Charts)	77
Sweden Heatseeker (Sverigetopplistan)	8
US Comedy Digital Track Sales (Billboard)	1

== See also ==
- List of diss tracks § YouTube clips
- PewDiePie videography
