= Party in Backyard =

Dutch YouTuber and music producer

YouTube information
- Channel: Party in Backyard
- Years active: 2012–present
- Genre: Music production
- Subscribers: 384 thousand
- Views: 100.5 million
- Last updated: 18 October 2026

Party in Backyard is a Dutch YouTuber and record producer based in Eindhoven, Netherlands.

== Career ==
In 2018, Party in Backyard released a joint single with Swedish YouTuber PewDiePie, called "Bitch Lasagna". The song reached number 18 on the UK Independent Singles and Album Breakers Charts. Later that year, Party in Backyard's remix of "Hej Hej Monika" was counted among the most popular YouTube clips in Sweden for 2018.

Party in Backyard and PewDiePie again teamed up in 2019 with the single "Mine All Day". The song peaked at number 3 on the US Comedy Digital Track Sales published by Billboard.

Party in Backyard created the instrumentals for PewDiePie's "YouTube Rewind, but its actually good" for the years 2018 and 2019, and made the instrumental in the intro for MrBeast's "Rewind 2020, Thank God its Over".

== Discography ==
Charting singles
Title	Year	Peak chart positions	
Title	Year	US Comedy Digital Tracks	UK Indie Breakers
"Bitch Lasagna" (with PewDiePie)	2018	—	18
"Mine All Day" (with PewDiePie)	2019	3	—
