= PewDiePie vs T-Series =

2018–2019 YouTube rivalry

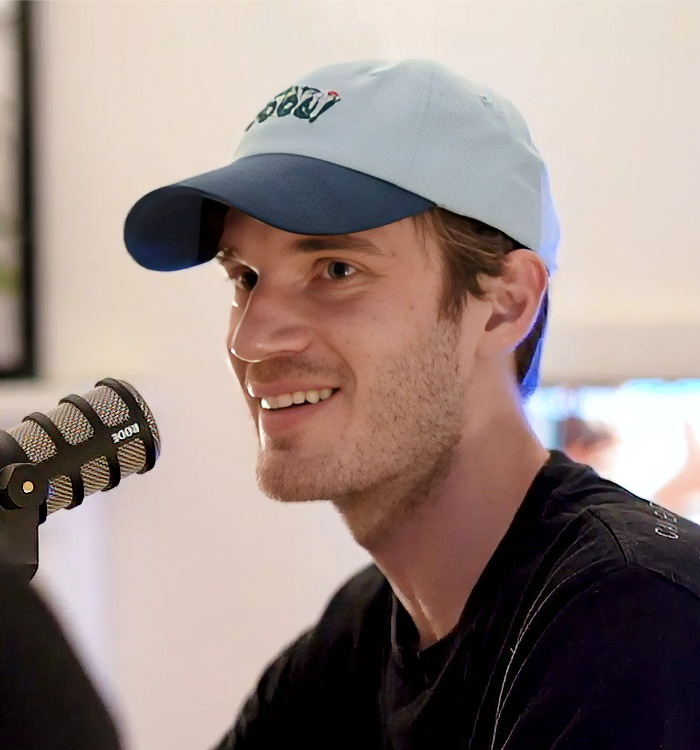
- PewDiePie in 2019 T-Series's logo
- Date: 29 August 2018 – 28 April 2019 (8 months)
- Caused by: Public competition/rivalry about being the most-subscribed YouTube channel; individual vs corporate culture on YouTube
- Medium: Word-of-mouth marketing; advertising; website support; slogans; activism; hacking; spamming; minor civil disobedience
- Resulted in: T-Series victory: T-Series overtakes PewDiePie as the most-subscribed YouTube channel on 14 April 2019.; On 28 April 2019, PewDiePie called on supporters to end their efforts to keep him as the most subscribed YouTube channel after the Christchurch mosque shootings, where the perpetrator mentioned his name before the massacre.; T-Series becomes the first YouTube channel to reach 100 million subscribers on 29 May 2019.

Parties
PewDiePie; Supported by: MrBeast; Markiplier; Jacksepticeye; Logan Paul; Dude Perfect; Drama Alert; Boyinaband; RoomieOfficial; Other YouTubers	T-Series; Supported by: Jus Reign; CarryMinati; Aamir Khan

Works
"Bitch Lasagna"; "Congratulations"	None

PewDiePie vs T-Series was an online rivalry between two YouTube channels, PewDiePie (run by Felix Kjellberg) and T-Series (run by the Indian record company of the same name), for the title of the most-subscribed YouTube channel. The rivalry began when T-Series's subscriber count began to near PewDiePie's in late 2018, who had held the title of most-subscribed YouTube channel since August 2013. The rivalry lasted for 8 months until PewDiePie was officially surpassed by T-Series in April 2019, a title T-Series would hold until being surpassed themselves by MrBeast in June 2024.

Many YouTubers voiced their support for PewDiePie, including Markiplier, Jacksepticeye, MrBeast, DanTDM, KSI, H3h3Productions and Logan Paul. Many of his fans, known as "9-year-old army", made efforts to gain subscribers for his YouTube channel in numerous ways, including organised marches and supportive YouTube videos. Supporters of PewDiePie often used the slogan "Subscribe to PewDiePie". The activism of some supporters extended beyond legal grounds; vandalism, hacking of websites, social media accounts, personal devices and the creation of malware had taken place to urge people to subscribe. "Bitch Lasagna", a diss track by PewDiePie against T-Series, and the use of anti-Indian remarks by some of his fans (which PewDiePie would later criticize), led to several prominent Indian YouTubers publicly opposing PewDiePie and backing T-Series with YouTube videos and response diss tracks.

T-Series temporarily overtook PewDiePie in subscribers on numerous occasions starting from February 2019, including taking a good lead from 27 March to 1 April, before PewDiePie made a viral comeback. On 28 April 2019, PewDiePie released a video calling for his supporters to end their efforts to keep him as the most subscribed YouTube channel after the Christchurch mosque shootings, where the terrorist mentioned his name before the massacre. With the significant lead long held by T-Series, the competition is generally presumed to have ended with T-Series winning.

== Background and overview ==
Felix Kjellberg, better known online as PewDiePie, is a Swedish YouTuber who makes comedic videos. He has traditionally been known for his Let's Play videos, and his channel was the most subscribed on YouTube from 15 August 2013 until 22 February 2019, when he was briefly surpassed by T-Series due to a YouTube routine audit, although PewDiePie took back the title shortly after approximately 8 minutes. His fan base at the time of the competition was generally known as the "9-year-old army".

T-Series is an Indian music record label and film production company. On YouTube, it has a multi-channel network consisting of 29 channels (excluding Lahari Music), run by a team of 13 people. The main T-Series channel primarily contains Indian music videos (Bollywood music and Indi-pop) as well as Bollywood film trailers, and releases several videos every day, having uploaded over 20 thousand videos as of October 2023.

The competition between the two channels began after T-Series began to near PewDiePie in subscribers in late 2018. T-Series temporarily overtook PewDiePie in subscribers on numerous occasions in early 2019, and on 27 March 2019, it became the most subscribed YouTube channel for five consecutive days, before PewDiePie regained the lead. PewDiePie then held the lead for 2 weeks, before T-Series passed him on 14 April 2019, reaching 100 million subscribers on 29 May 2019.

== Activism ==
=== Support of PewDiePie ===
==== From YouTubers ====
The first prominent YouTuber to support PewDiePie was MrBeast, who bought billboards and radio advertisements in North Carolina urging people to subscribe to PewDiePie's channel. He also created a video of himself saying "PewDiePie" 100,000 times in a period of over 12 hours. MrBeast and his friends attended Super Bowl LIII, wearing T-shirts reading "Sub 2 PewDiePie". The group was prominently displayed in an ESPN tweet after Stephen Gostkowski had missed a field goal during the first quarter.

Other prominent YouTubers such as Markiplier, Jacksepticeye and Logan Paul made videos or tweets announcing their support for PewDiePie in the competition, often under the slogan "Subscribe to PewDiePie". YouTuber Justin Roberts, a member of the group Team 10, bought a billboard in New York's Times Square reading the same slogan. Markiplier made a tongue-in-cheek live stream titled "I literally won't shut up until you subscribe to PewDiePie" urging his viewers to subscribe to PewDiePie's channel. Jacksepticeye ran a live stream with the same purpose, jokingly threatening to delete his channel if T-Series surpassed PewDiePie.

Smaller YouTubers also promoted PewDiePie. In reaction to MrBeast's advertising campaign, Saimandar Waghdhare, an independent Indian YouTuber with the channel "Saiman Says", responded to MrBeast's advertising campaign by posting a sarcastic video in which he pretends to support T-Series, later releasing a video in which he instead declares his support to PewDiePie.

YouTube Rewind 2018: Everyone Controls Rewind, the 2018 video edition of the annual YouTube Rewind series, became the most-disliked video on the platform after heavy backlash. One of the cited reasons for the criticism was the lack of coverage of the competition between PewDiePie and T-Series. YouTuber Jaiden Animations, however, had contributed to the video, and her animation included several hidden icons and objects referencing PewDiePie, such as his chair.

==== Hackings ====
A hacker under the pseudonym "HackerGiraffe" sent print jobs to around 50,000 vulnerable printers in November, and another hacker under the pseudonym "j3ws3r" did the same to around 80,000 printers in December. Messages were printed out saying "PewDiePie is in trouble and he needs your help to defeat T-Series!" and urged printer users to subscribe to PewDiePie, unsubscribe from T-Series, and fix their printer's security settings. HackerGiraffe claimed that he had discovered more than 800,000 vulnerable printers using the search engine Shodan used for finding vulnerable devices. In January 2019, more than 65,000 of Google's Chromecast streaming dongles were hacked by HackerGiraffe and j3ws3r, displaying a message on smart TVs urging people to subscribe to PewDiePie and adjust their security settings. However, despite positive feedback from some people, one of the hackers anonymously revealed to the BBC that he suffered a breakdown due to the prospect of facing jail time and angry messages urging him to commit suicide, but did not regret lowering the number of vulnerable personal devices. Also in January, dozens of Nest cameras were compromised by a hacker under the pseudonym "SydeFX" using credential stuffing, who spoke to victims through the cameras, demanding they subscribe to PewDiePie.

Hacking was not limited to hardware. In December 2018, one of The Wall Street Journal's websites was hacked to display a message apologizing for articles accusing PewDiePie of antisemitism and to tell readers to subscribe to his YouTube channel. The hacker j3ws3r also took down T-Series's website with a denial-of-service attack. In February 2019, Bob Buckhorn, the mayor of Tampa, Florida, had his Twitter account hacked to post malicious tweets, one of these encouraging users to subscribe to PewDiePie. On 22 March 2019, a user on the PewDiePie subreddit developed ransomware by the name PewCrypt that encrypted files on other peoples Microsoft Windows machines. The attacker claimed he would release a decryption key when PewDiePie hit the 100 million subscriber milestone, however, the author claimed that if T-Series claimed that goal first, the decryption tool would be deleted permanently.

==== Other activism ====
On 4 November 2018, a group of young fans began to hand out posters in Dhaka, the capital city of Bangladesh, which PewDiePie acknowledged in a YouTube video. On 27 February 2019, Basketball Club Žalgiris based in Kaunas, Lithuania, had cheerleaders performing "Bitch Lasagna" during a time-out.

Several marches were held in support of PewDiePie. On 27 February 2019, a parade was held in Tallinn, Estonia in support of PewDiePie. Up to several hundreds of people took part in the march, which went through Tallinn's Old Town and other busy areas of the city centre. During the 2019 India–Pakistan standoff, T-Series removed the music of Pakistani pop artists from its channel. In response, there was a march in Pakistan where protesters held signs reading "Unsubscribe T-Series" and expressed their support for PewDiePie. On 10 March 2019, a rally was held in Moscow for internet freedom, coordinated by the Libertarian Party of Russia. During the rally protesters played "Bitch Lasagna" and held signs which read "Sub to PewDiePie".

On 12 March 2019, indie game developer Thomas Brush released a video game on itch.io based on PewDiePie vs. T-Series called Zero Deaths, which takes place in a post-apocalyptic setting where PewDiePie must defend Marzia Bisognin, his wife, from fake YouTube subscribers known as "sub bots".

On 29 April 2019, a plane flew over New York City with a banner attached saying "Subscribe to PewDiePie". More than 21,000 people watched PewDiePie's live stream on DLive showing the plane with its banner fly over the city. During the live stream, PewDiePie said that the event (which happened after his request to end efforts against T-Series) was "a nice little wrap up" to the Subscribe to PewDiePie meme. The flight and banner, which costed more than $4,500, were crowdfunded by PewDiePie's fanbase.

The right-wing populist UK Independence Party announced their support for PewDiePie in a tweet. In an October 2019 interview with Kevin Roose of The New York Times, Kjellberg said of UKIP's support that "It's kind of funny how a political party would post about a meme" but that "it's also kind of like, Ehh, don't drag me into your politics."

==== Criminal acts ====
Although PewDiePie told his fans not to do "anything illegal" in their activism, some supporters committed criminal acts of vandalism to spread the "Subscribe to PewDiePie" meme. In March 2019, the Brooklyn War Memorial was vandalized with graffiti reading "Subscribe to PewDiePie". The New York City Department of Parks and Recreation said that they would remove it. PewDiePie later condemned the action, and stated that he had made a donation to the park. Another vandalism case occurred two days prior when "SUB 2 pewdiepie" was written on a school's property in Oxford, United Kingdom.

In the moments leading up to the March 2019 Christchurch mosque shootings, the perpetrator said on Facebook live, "Remember lads, subscribe to PewDiePie", as he live-streamed the shootings. PewDiePie stated in a YouTube video that after this incident the "Subscribe to PewDiePie" meme should have ended, and that he delayed the announcement "out of respect for the affected families".

=== Support of T-Series ===
The rivalry between PewDiePie and T-Series received more attention in India due to controversial actions by PewDiePie and his fans. PewDiePie's "Bitch Lasagna" diss track contained some derogatory lyrics about Indian people that some Indians found offensive. Many of PewDiePie's fans had engaged in negatively spamming and trolling the T-Series channel, which included swarming T-Series's videos with PewDiePie-related comments, disliking videos, and flagging their videos with false reports. A number of PewDiePie's fans and supporters had also been making anti-Indian remarks and using racial slurs.

The actions of such fans led to several independent Indian YouTubers announcing their opposition to PewDiePie and support for T-Series. In November 2018, Indian-Canadian comedian and YouTuber Jus Reign uploaded a video called "In Defense of T-Series", where he talks about T-Series, mentions his childhood listening to their music, and shows a short music video at the end celebrating T-Series. In response to PewDiePie's "Bitch Lasagna" diss track, several Indian YouTubers responded with their own Hindi-language diss tracks against PewDiePie. Tatva K released his diss track "Pew Ki Pie" in November 2018, followed by Asif Bantaye releasing his diss track "PENDUBHAI" in December 2018. On 1 January 2019, Indian YouTuber CarryMinati, released a diss track called "Bye PewDiePie", which garnered nearly 5 million views in 24 hours.

== Response ==
=== PewDiePie ===
In August 2018, PewDiePie posted a video titled "this channel will overtake PewDiePie" in which he jokingly rallied his fans against T-Series. The video also referenced the KSI vs Logan Paul YouTube boxing match, which similarly involved a rivalry between two major YouTubers. On 5 October 2018, PewDiePie, in collaboration with musician Party In Backyard, posted a diss track against T-Series, titled "Bitch Lasagna". The title of the song is in reference to a viral Facebook Messenger screenshot, in which an Indian man demands nude photos of a Western woman, and when his requests remain unanswered, refers to her as "bitch lasagna". In the song, he insults T-Series and their video contents, makes references to contemporary Indian stereotypes and accuses the company of using sub bots to gain false subscriptions.

After he was asked about his "serious opinions" about the situation, PewDiePie said: "I don't really care about T-Series, I genuinely don't, but I think if YouTube does shift in a way where it does feel more corporate, [then] something else will take its place. I think people enjoy this connection so much, I think something else will just show up, if it feels too corporate." He also blamed YouTube for a lack of support toward individual YouTubers. Speaking to Metro in November 2018, PewDiePie said that he was "surprised no one has stepped up sooner", referring to T-Series competing for the most-subscribed spot.

In December 2018, PewDiePie made a video calling on his viewers to support the Indian non-governmental organization Child Rights and You, in response to some of his fans' anti-Indian sentiment. In the video, Kjellberg says "No more 'f*** India', let's (instead) help India." He raised £173,682, including a donation by Minecraft creator Markus Persson, and also ran a charity live stream the next day.

On 3 February 2019, PewDiePie live-streamed himself playing Fortnite on YouTube in an attempt to stop T-Series from surpassing him. He later ran two more live streams for the same purpose, playing Roblox on one occasion, and minigames in Minecraft on another.

On 27 March 2019, T-Series surpassed PewDiePie. Following this, PewDiePie suggested through Twitter that the "winner" of the competition would be whoever reached 100 million subscribers first. On 31 March, he posted another diss track: an upbeat synth-pop/hip-hop music video with YouTubers RoomieOfficial and Boyinaband, titled "Congratulations", which sarcastically congratulated T-Series for surpassing him. In the music video, PewDiePie mocks how T-Series sent him a cease and desist letter alleging that his actions and lyrics of "Bitch Lasagna" were defamatory. The video also criticizes T-Series for alleged tax evasion and the fact that the company was founded through the selling of pirated songs. Following PewDiePie's upload of the song, he regained the number one spot.

On 28 April 2019, PewDiePie requested in a video that his viewers end the "Subscribe to PewDiePie" meme, stating that it "started out of love and support, so let's end it with that." He also discussed the mental toll the Christchurch shooter's mention of his name had on him, stating "to have my name associated with something so unspeakably vile has affected me in more ways than I've let shown. I just didn't want to address it right away, and I didn't want to give the terrorist more attention. I didn't want to make it about me, because I don't think it has anything to do with me. To put it plainly, I didn't want hate to win ... But it's clear to me now the 'Subscribe to PewDiePie' movement should have ended then."

PewDiePie tweeted that he felt "sickened" to have his name uttered by the attacker, and expressed his condolences to the victims' loved ones. Those who had helped to popularize the meme, like Ethan Klein, were repulsed that the phrase had been used as a call to arms by the attacker, and urged people to stop spreading the meme, hoping that it would die out. The perpetrator of the 27 April 2019 Poway synagogue shooting also mentioned PewDiePie, claiming without evidence that the shooting was planned and financed by PewDiePie.

Following the 2019 Christchurch shootings, Kevin Roose of The New York Times wrote that the perpetrator's goal behind saying "subscribe to PewDiePie" during his livestream of the attack "may have been to pull a popular internet figure into a fractious blame game and inflame political tensions everywhere." News18 reported a tweet cautioning that the shooter's intended consequence was that haters of PewDiePie would be inclined to blame PewDiePie rather than the shooter in order to "further [the accusers'] political agenda."

=== T-Series ===
In September 2018, T-Series president and head of its digital division Neeraj Kalyan said "It's a matter of pride for all Indians that an Indian YouTube Channel will soon be world's biggest channel on YouTube". He also addressed PewDiePie fans, stating "No amount of spamming will be able to hold back the power of good music." Kalyan further added that the channel's overseas viewership had increased as a result of the subscriber race, stating that "people in the West, or in the East as far as Japan were not even aware of us. They now know about us because of all that controversy."

T-Series chairman and managing director Bhushan Kumar, son of late founder Gulshan Kumar, told the BBC in December 2018 that he had never heard of PewDiePie until "a few months ago". He stated he was "really not bothered about this race" and voiced his confusion as to why PewDiePie was "taking this so seriously", adding that they were "not competing with him." In February 2019, Kumar was reported by The Washington Post to have said that "Everybody knows T-Series across the world now. If we had become number one on our own, nobody would have known about us."

On 6 March 2019, Kumar tweeted "We're on the brink of becoming the world's biggest @YouTube channel. We can make history. We can make India win. Subscribe to @TSeries", posting a video encouraging Indians to subscribe to T-Series's channel. In the video, he stated "this is a historic movement for all of us, so let's come together and subscribe to T-Series's YouTube channel and make India proud."

In April 2019, T-Series sought a court order from the Delhi High Court to remove PewDiePie's diss tracks from YouTube. Despite PewDiePie's statement that these diss tracks were "done in good fun", the court issued a temporary injunction in favour of T-Series on 8 April 2019. The complaint against Kjellberg claimed that his songs were "defamatory, disparaging, insulting, and offensive," and noted that comments on the videos were "abusive, vulgar, and also racist in nature." Access to the diss tracks on YouTube was blocked in India. In August 2019, it was reported that T-Series and PewDiePie had settled their legal disputes outside of court.

In a May 2019 interview with Sangeeta Tanwar from Quartz India, when asked the question "What does being the number one channel on YouTube mean to you? Does it help business?" Kumar said:

"We were never in this tussle to become number one or two with anyone. But all along there were these sarcastic comments from PewDiePie. And that's how we decided to respond to the comments. I launched the #BharatWinsYouTube campaign, seeking more subscriptions from Indians. For us, this status does not result in any change on the commercial front. However, it changes the perception about who we are. With these developments, T-Series gets promoted. What is heartening is that now we are seeing growth even in countries where people were not watching our channel earlier."

— Sangeeta Tanwar, T-Series chief says PewDiePie asked for a YouTube fight and got it, Quartz India (May 2019)

=== YouTube ===
Referring to T-Series's rise to prominence on YouTube, YouTube Asia Pacific's managing director Gautam Anand told The New York Times: "As more and more of India came along, video became the way that they were interacting with the internet", mentioning that 85 per cent of Indian internet users used YouTube. He furthered, "Even if you're not literate, you still enjoy watching video", and mentioned: "India is a really great bright spot. It's one of the fastest-growing markets even within Asia."

On 14 December 2018, YouTube removed a large number of bot and inactive subscribers from the platform. The change affected the subscriber count of both channels in the competition: PewDiePie lost over 55,000 subscribers and T-Series lost more than 220,000 subscribers from its main channel.

=== Media ===
Anthony Cuthbertson of The Independent described the rivalry as a shift in how established media companies viewed YouTube. The Guardian's Nosheen Iqbal described T-Series as "a challenger from the streets of Delhi", referring to the origins of its founder Gulshan Kumar, who was a fruit juice seller when he founded the company.

Vox's Aja Romano noted that the competition represented the growing divide of subcultures on YouTube—on one side were the creators who had developed their own channels over the course of YouTube's history, and on the other side corporations who used YouTube as a platform to advertise their shows from external platforms.

Patricia Hernandez of The Verge compared the rivalry to the KSI vs Logan Paul boxing match. She described PewDiePie's antagonism as "all for show" and stated that "rivalries play a huge role on YouTube because they give viewers narratives where pseudo-heroes and villains exist with low (if any) stakes."

The Washington Post reported that the success of T-Series represented the fast growth of Internet in India, with an increase from 20 million Indians with Internet access in 2000 to 560 million in 2018. The Post noted that India became the second-largest mobile phone market in 2018, and highlighted mobile data plans in India, noting the importance of voice technology because of the low rate of literacy in India. Journalist Ravi Agrawal said that India quickly progressed to cheap mobile phones by skipping slower initial technological advances in the west. Vice reported that T-Series's success lay in focusing on regional audiences and having no competitors in online music in India.

== Aftermath ==
On 5 August 2023, MrBeast posted on his Twitter page "I'm doing this for Pewdiepie", - while comparing the subcounts between his channel and T-Series's channel. The Indian Express reported that this comment would renew "the battle for the most-subscribed YouTube channel". MrBeast surpassed T-Series in subscribers on 1 June 2024. MrBeast then posted his reaction on Twitter stating he "finally avenged Pewdiepie".

As of 3 November 2026, T-Series is currently the second most subscribed YouTube channel, with more than 316 million subscribers, with MrBeast leading by a significant subscriber margin of over 200 million subscribers. Meanwhile, PewDiePie is currently the fourteenth most subscribed YouTube channel, with an estimated 109 million subscribers, as his subscriber count has been gradually declining in recent years. He is now semi-retired from YouTube, uploading significantly less compared to his daily uploads in the 2010s.
