= PewDiePie: Legend of the Brofist =

2015 action-adventure platform game

- Developer: Outerminds Inc.
- Publisher: Outerminds Inc.
- Composer: Tadd Nuznov
- Engine: Unity
- Platforms: iOS, Android, tvOS, Microsoft Windows, OS X
- Release: iOS, Android, tvOS: WW: 24 September 2015; Microsoft Windows, OS X: WW: 10 December 2015
- Genres: Action-adventure, platform
- Modes: Single-player, multiplayer

PewDiePie: Legend of the Brofist is a 2D side-scrolling action-adventure platform video game developed and published by Canadian-based indie development studio Outerminds Inc., in collaboration with PewDiePie. The game was released for iOS and Android on September 24th, 2015 and became the top-grossing paid game in the United States App Store less than two hours after its release. The Microsoft Windows and OS X versions were released on 10 December 2015, with an additional co-op mode.

PewDiePie had long-time aspirations for launching his own video game, and in December 2014, he revealed to his fans that he was collaborating with Outerminds Inc. to make a PewDiePie themed video game. He was heavily involved in the game’s development to ensure that it would turn out the way his fans would have liked.

The game includes references to previous videos and pop culture, with CinnamonToastKen, Markiplier, Cryaotic, Jacksepticeye and CutiePieMarzia lending voices.

== Gameplay ==
PewDiePie: Legend of the Brofist is a two-dimensional platform game. In its fictional universe, a barrel army attempts to steal PewDiePie’s YouTube fans and the player embarks on an adventure to save them by completing quests, defeating bosses, and collecting Brocoins. Playable characters include PewDiePie, CutiePieMarzia, and their pet pugs. The game features voice acting from a handful of YouTubers besides PewDiePie, such as CinnamonToastKen, Markiplier, Jacksepticeye and Cryaotic. It includes many references to characters and in-jokes found in PewDiePie's YouTube videos, including his character's hatred for barrels.

== Plot ==
After PewDiePie uploads a vlog, he finds his most recent video to be surprisingly unwatched. Soon after, a barrel tries to attack him unsuccessfully. He finds CutiePieMarzia and the pugs, Edgar and Maya, and the keys to the car. Just before he leaves with the pugs, the Barrel King announces that PewDiePie's fans have been captured in order to find out about the Legendary Brofist, of which he has no memory. Immediately, he leaves, while Marzia goes back into bed to continue eating snacks.

Just as PewDiePie drives into the highway, General Barrel appears behind him in a tank. PewDiePie manages to evade him temporarily, before being cornered on a truck. However, Markiplier picks him up on his stealth jet, but due to the cost of jet fuel, PewDiePie is left on a smaller plane. General Barrel attacks again with his flying tank, but is killed in the scuffle. PewDiePie is forced to head to the North Pole, following the dying words of General Barrel.

At the North Pole, PewDiePie finds Shannon, a female shark and fangirl, and rescues her from the barrels. Soon after, he meets CinnamonToastKen on top of a steep cliff which PewDiePie is unable to climb. PewDiePie takes Stephano, a small talking golden statue, from his pocket and uses him as a grappling hook to climb up, but leaves him behind. In a cave, he meets Generoll Barrel, the brother of General Barrel, who had heard of his death by PewDiePie, but is defeated by the help of CinnamonToastKen's smelling senses. Just before he dies, Generoll Barrel contacts Barrel King about his defeat, who, in reply, hires an unnamed mercenary. CinnamonToastKen then stays behind to ensure PewDiePie is not being followed.

After PewDiePie ventures further, he frees Jacksepticeye from a failed trap meant for PewDiePie. In return, Jacksepticeye leads him out with the help of his "eye", his pet that can shoot lasers, and to Africa, the location of the Barrel King's base. They find the exit blocked by Jennifer, a talking female rock and obsessed fangirl, who is moved by the eye. At the exit, Jacksepticeye stays behind to ensure PewDiePie is not being followed, to PewDiePie's dismay. He exits to the mystic forests of Transylvania, and is picked up by Markiplier again after being called, by a helicopter, which Markiplier got as a package deal with the stealth jet.

Markiplier then drops off PewDiePie at Africa. After a long journey by rhino stampede, he eventually finds out that the hired mercenary is FalconLover, a lesser-known YouTuber and anthropomorphic giraffe. After being defeated, he confesses that he just wanted to be noticed, and he tells PewDiePie to download an app called "UFOGO" in order to get to the Barrel base. After being picked up by a UFO, he finds Cryaotic, a fellow YouTuber. Soon after, they are both teleported at the Moon. They both share their feelings for each other, and are about to kiss, until Marzia reveals to know what's going on. Embarrassed, Cryaotic leaves, to PewDiePie's dismay.

He then finds the secret base of the Barrel King, along with his captured fans. The Barrel King is defeated in a final showdown between him and PewDiePie, and the fans are freed. The King is still alive, but PewDiePie then begins to levitate and glow, as the fans crumble together to create the Legendary Brofist. The Barrel King asks PewDiePie how he created the Brofist, to which PewDiePie replies that love was the answer, and that the Barrel King was empty inside. Instantly, the Barrel King is crushed and killed, while everyone celebrates.

After the end credits, the Barrel King's remains are seen being carried by the Barrels.

== Reception ==
Reception

Aggregate score
Aggregator	Score
Metacritic	iOS: 77/100

Review scores
Publication	Score
Destructoid	8.5/10
Gamezebo	3.5/5
Pocket Gamer	3/5
The Guardian	4/5
TouchArcade	4/5

The game has been generally well received. Many reviewers praised the classic 8-bit-style graphics filled with references to video games and YouTube culture. The Guardian gave the game a score of 4 out of 5 stars and described it as a "carefully crafted touchscreen platformer that knows its gaming history." The game was also a financial success, grossing over $100,000 the day of its release in the United States.
