= PewDiePie =

Swedish YouTuber (born 1989)

- Kjellberg in 2019
- Born: Felix Arvid Ulf Kjellberg; 24 October 1989 (age 37); Gothenburg, Sweden
- Other name: Pewds
- Occupation: YouTuber
- Years active: 2010–present
- Works: Videography
- Spouse: Marzia Bisognin (m. 2019)
- Children: 1

YouTube information
- Channel: PewDiePie
- Genres: Let's Play; vlog; comedy; commentary; satire
- Subscribers: 109 million
- Views: 29.5 billion
- Kjellberg's voice Describing one of his tattoos on the Cold Ones podcast Recorded July 2019
- Last updated: 29 October 2026

Felix Arvid Ulf Kjellberg (Note: English: /ˈʃɛlbɜːrɡ/ SHEL-burg, Swedish: [ˈfěːlɪks ˈǎrːvɪd ɵlf ˈɕɛ̂lːbærj].) (born 24 October 1989), known online as PewDiePie, (Note: /ˈpjuːdiːpaɪ/ PEW-dee-py.) is a Swedish YouTuber. He is known for his gaming videos, satirical commentary, comedy-sketches and lifestyle vlogging. Kjellberg's popularity on YouTube and extensive media coverage have made him one of the most noted online personalities and content creators. Media coverage of him has called him a figurehead for YouTube, especially in the gaming genre.

Kjellberg registered his YouTube channel "PewDiePie" in 2010, primarily posting Let's Play videos of horror and action video games. His channel gained a substantial following and was one of the fastest growing channels in 2012 and 2013, before becoming the most-subscribed on YouTube on 15 August 2013. From 29 December 2014 to 14 February 2017, Kjellberg's channel was also the most-viewed on the platform. After becoming the platform's most-popular creator, he diversified his content, shifting its focus from Let's Plays and began to frequently include vlogs, comedy shorts, formatted shows, and music videos. For its first foray into original programming as part of the relaunch of its subscription service, YouTube also enlisted Kjellberg to star in a reality web series titled Scare PewDiePie.

Kjellberg's content was already noted for its polarizing reception among general audiences online, but in the late 2010s, it became more controversial and attracted increased media scrutiny. A 2017 article by The Wall Street Journal alleging his content included antisemitic themes and imagery prompted other outlets to write further criticism of him and companies to sever their business partnerships with Kjellberg. Though he acknowledged the content which garnered media ire as inappropriate, he defended it as humor taken out of context and vehemently rebuked the Journal's reporting in particular.

In late 2018 and early 2019, Kjellberg engaged in a public competition with Indian record label T-Series, before his channel was ultimately overtaken by the label's as the most-subscribed on YouTube. Shortly following this, he returned to making regular gaming uploads, with a focus on Minecraft, generating record viewership for his channel. In the 2020s, Kjellberg became more reserved online, uploading less consistently and taking frequent breaks from Internet use. Meanwhile, in his personal life, he moved to Japan with his wife, Italian Internet personality Marzia. He has since semi-retired from YouTube, choosing to upload less frequently and for his enjoyment rather than as a career. His content has since centered on his family life and personal interests. As of August 2026, his main YouTube channel has earned over 109 million subscribers and 29.51 billion views, which still made his channel rank as one of the most-subscribed on YouTube.

Kjellberg is widely considered a pioneer and ambassador of YouTube's platform and culture, as well as largely influential to Internet culture in general, particularly its gaming subculture. His popularity online has been recognized to boost sales for the video games he plays, especially the ones developed independently. This has allowed him to stir support for charity fundraising drives. Some media outlets have opined that Kjellberg promoted hateful ideologies or described him as adjacent to them, while others have called such descriptions unfair. Noted as YouTube's most-popular creator for much of the 2010s, Time magazine named him as one of the world's 100 most influential people in 2016.

== Early life and education ==
Felix Arvid Ulf Kjellberg was born on 24 October 1989 in Gothenburg, where he was also raised. He was born to Lotta Kristine Johanna (née Hellstrand, born 1958) and Ulf Christian Kjellberg (born 1957), and grew up with his older sister, Fanny. His mother, a former chief information officer (CIO), was named the 2010 CIO of the Year in Sweden. His father is a corporate executive.

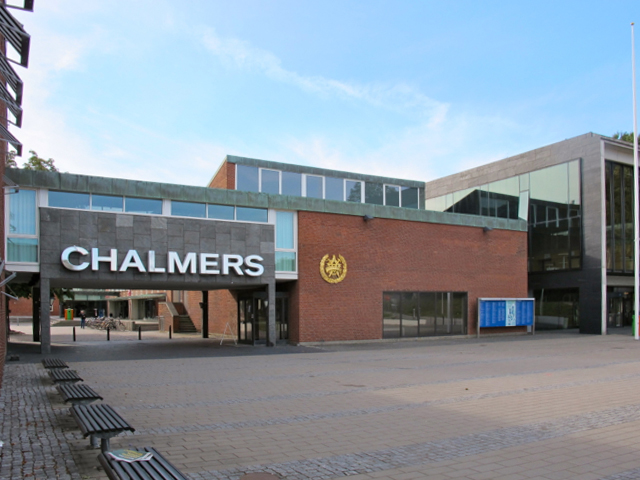
Kjellberg studied at Chalmers University of Technology in Gothenburg.

During his childhood, Kjellberg was interested in art and has detailed that he would draw popular video game characters such as Mario and Sonic the Hedgehog, as well as playing video games on his Super Nintendo Entertainment System, such as Star Fox and Donkey Kong Country 2: Diddy's Kong Quest. During high school, he frequently played video games in his bedroom and would skip classes to go to an Internet café with friends. During his last year of high school, he bought a computer with the money he made selling artwork through his grandmother's gallery.

Kjellberg then went on to pursue a degree in industrial engineering and management at Chalmers University of Technology in Gothenburg, but left the university in 2011. While it has been reported that he left Chalmers to focus on his YouTube career, Kjellberg clarified in 2017 that he had left due to a lack of interest in his course of study. He further expressed that, in general, leaving university to pursue a YouTube career would be "fucking stupid".

Kjellberg has also discussed an enjoyment of Adobe Photoshop, wanting to work on photo manipulation art using the program rather than be in school. Following this passion after he departed from Chalmers, he entered Photoshop contests and almost earned an apprenticeship at a prominent Scandinavian advertising agency. He was also interested in creating content on YouTube; after not earning the apprenticeship, he sold limited edition prints of his photoshopped images to purchase a computer to work on YouTube videos.

== YouTube career ==
=== 2010–2012: Early years ===
Kjellberg originally registered a YouTube account under the name "Pewdie" in December 2006; he explained that "pew" represents the sound of lasers and "die" refers to dying. After initially forgetting the password to this account, he registered the "PewDiePie" YouTube channel on 29 April 2010. Following his exit from Chalmers, his parents refused to support him financially, so he funded his early videos by working as a harbor captain, selling prints of his Photoshop art, and working at a hot dog stand. Kjellberg stated that the ability to make videos was more important to him than a prestigious career. Five years later, Kjellberg recalled, "I knew people were big at other types of videos, but there was no one big in gaming, and I didn't know you could make money out of it. It was never like a career that I could just quit college to pursue. It was just something I loved to do."

In his early years as a YouTube creator, Kjellberg focused on video game commentaries, most notably of horror and action video games. Some of his earliest videos featured commentaries of mainstream video games including Minecraft and Call of Duty, although he came to be particularly noted for his Let's Plays of horror games such as Amnesia: The Dark Descent and The Last of Us. On these videos, Kjellberg has stated "I was so shy back then," and added, "It was so weird to me, sitting alone in a room talking into a microphone. That was unheard of back at the time. No one really did it." Kjellberg's oldest video available for viewing is titled "Minecraft Multiplayer Fun". Uploaded on 2 October 2010, the video contained mainly Swedish commentary from Kjellberg, rather than the English language he employed in later videos.

Starting on 2 September 2011, he also began posting weekly vlogs under the title of Fridays with PewDiePie. The series was a weekly deviation from the Let's Play videos that formed most of his content output at the time, and often featured Kjellberg completing viewer requests.

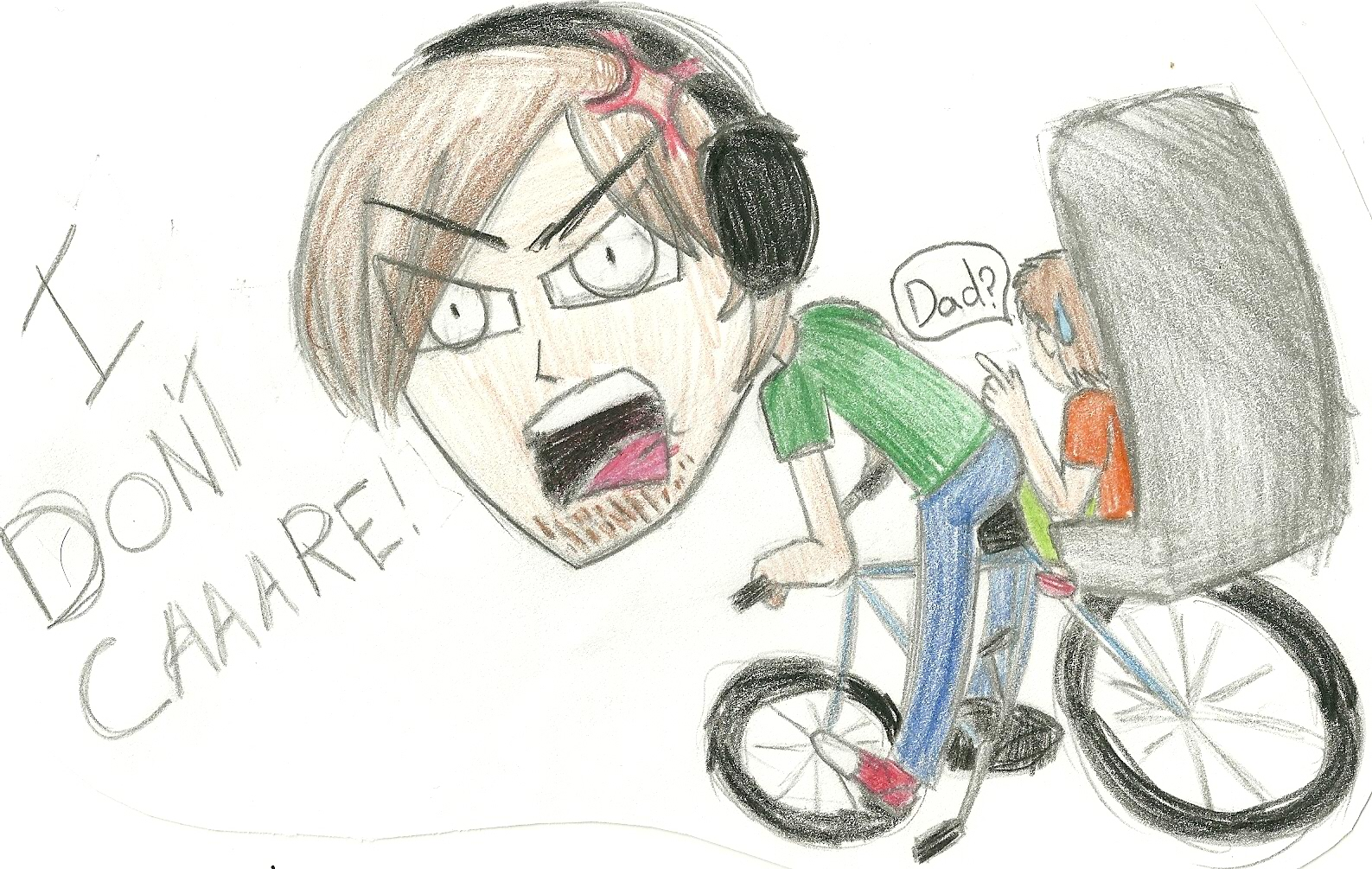
Fan art of Kjellberg from 2012, depicting him as a character from Happy Wheels

By December 2011, Kjellberg's channel had around 60,000 subscribers, before rapidly increasing in 2012. Around the time his channel earned 700,000 subscribers, Kjellberg spoke at Nonick Conference 2012. July 2012 saw his channel reaching 1 million subscribers. In October, OpenSlate ranked Kjellberg's channel as the No. 1 YouTube channel. Kjellberg signed with Maker Studios in December, a multi-channel network (MCN) that drives the growth of the channels under it. Prior to his partnership with Maker, he was signed to Machinima, a rival of Maker's. Kjellberg expressed feeling neglected by Machinima; frustrated with their treatment, he hired a lawyer to free him from his contract with the network.

Early in his YouTube career, Kjellberg used jokes about rape in his videos. Michael "Slowbeef" Sawyer, a fellow Let's Play YouTuber, created a video mocking Kjellberg's content and highlighting his usage of such jokes. Shortly after, Kjellberg attracted criticism and controversy for the jokes, and in October 2012, he addressed the issue through a Tumblr post, writing, "I just wanted to make clear that I'm no longer making rape jokes, as I mentioned before I'm not looking to hurt anyone and I apologise if it ever did." The Globe and Mail stated "unlike many young gamers, he listened when fans and critics alike pointed out their harmful nature, and resolved to stop making rape jokes."

=== 2013–2014: Becoming the most-subscribed and most-viewed user ===
By 2013, Kjellberg became "ubiquitous" on the platform. On 18 February, his channel reached 5 million subscribers, and in April, he was covered in The New York Times after surpassing 6 million subscribers. In May 2013, at the inaugural Starcount Social Stars Awards in Singapore, Kjellberg won the award for "Swedish Social Star". Nominated alongside Jenna Marbles, Smosh, and Toby Turner, he also won the award for "Most Popular Social Show". In June, Kjellberg published "A Funny Montage", an entry in his series of compilations of clips from previous uploads. Many of his most-viewed videos are such compilations, and the specific June 2013 entry spent a considerable amount of time as Kjellberg's most-viewed video overall, with publications citing it as such through 2018.

In July, he overtook Jenna Marbles to become the second most-subscribed user, and shortly thereafter surpassed 10 million subscribers. On 1 August, Kjellberg signed with Maker's gaming sub-network, Polaris. Polaris functioned as a relaunching of The Game Station, Maker's gaming network. On 15 August, Kjellberg became the most-subscribed user on YouTube, surpassing Smosh. For the achievement, Kjellberg received a certificate from Guinness World Records. In November, YouTube's Spotlight channel overtook Kjellberg's as the most-subscribed. Later in the month, Kjellberg proclaimed his dislike of YouTube's new comment system, and disabled the comment section on all of his videos. After a brief back-and-forth in December, his channel firmly supplanted the YouTube Spotlight on 23 December to once again become the most-subscribed on YouTube. Throughout 2012 and 2013, Kjellberg's channel was one of the fastest-growing on YouTube, in terms of subscribers gained. Billboard reported that the channel gained more subscribers than any other channel in 2013.

Around 2014, as YouTube began to invest more deeply in creators, the company developed a classification system for its stable of stars. Either they followed the SNL model, using YouTube to springboard into TV or film, or they took the Oprah path, building empires of fervent audiences right on YouTube.

PewDiePie was one of the best Oprahs. He lived and breathed YouTube.

— Mark Bengen, Like, Comment, Subscribe (2022)

In 2014, Kjellberg's commentaries, then best known for featuring horror video games, began to actively feature games that interested him regardless of genre. That September, Kjellberg again announced he would disable comments on his YouTube videos, intending for this to be a permanent change. He reasoned that most comments were either spam and self-advertisements. Though he disabled his YouTube comments, Kjellberg continued interacting with his audience through Twitter and Reddit. On 13 October, he decided to allow comments on his videos once more, albeit only after approval. However, he expressed that he toggled his comment settings this way so that he could redirect viewers to instead comment on the forums of his Broarmy.net website. Kjellberg stated in a later video that disabling comments made him happier.

Also in October, Kjellberg hinted at the possibility that he would not renew his contract with Maker Studios upon its expiration in December. He expressed his frustrations with the studio's parent company, Disney, and mulled the option of launching his own network. However, in light of news outlets reporting his disinterest with Maker, he tweeted, "I feel like I was misquoted in The WSJ, and I'm really happy with the work that Maker has been doing for me." Kjellberg ultimately continued creating videos under Maker. His relationship with Maker saw the network launch an official PewDiePie website and online store to sell merchandise, in addition to an official PewDiePie app for the iPhone that released earlier that August, allowing audiences to view his videos, create custom favourite video feeds, and share videos with others. In return, Kjellberg promoted Maker's media interests, and gave the network a share of his YouTube ad revenue.

According to Social Blade, Kjellberg's channel became the most-viewed channel on the website on 29 December 2014, having amassed over 7 billion views by that date.

=== 2015–2017: YouTube Red, Revelmode, and style change ===
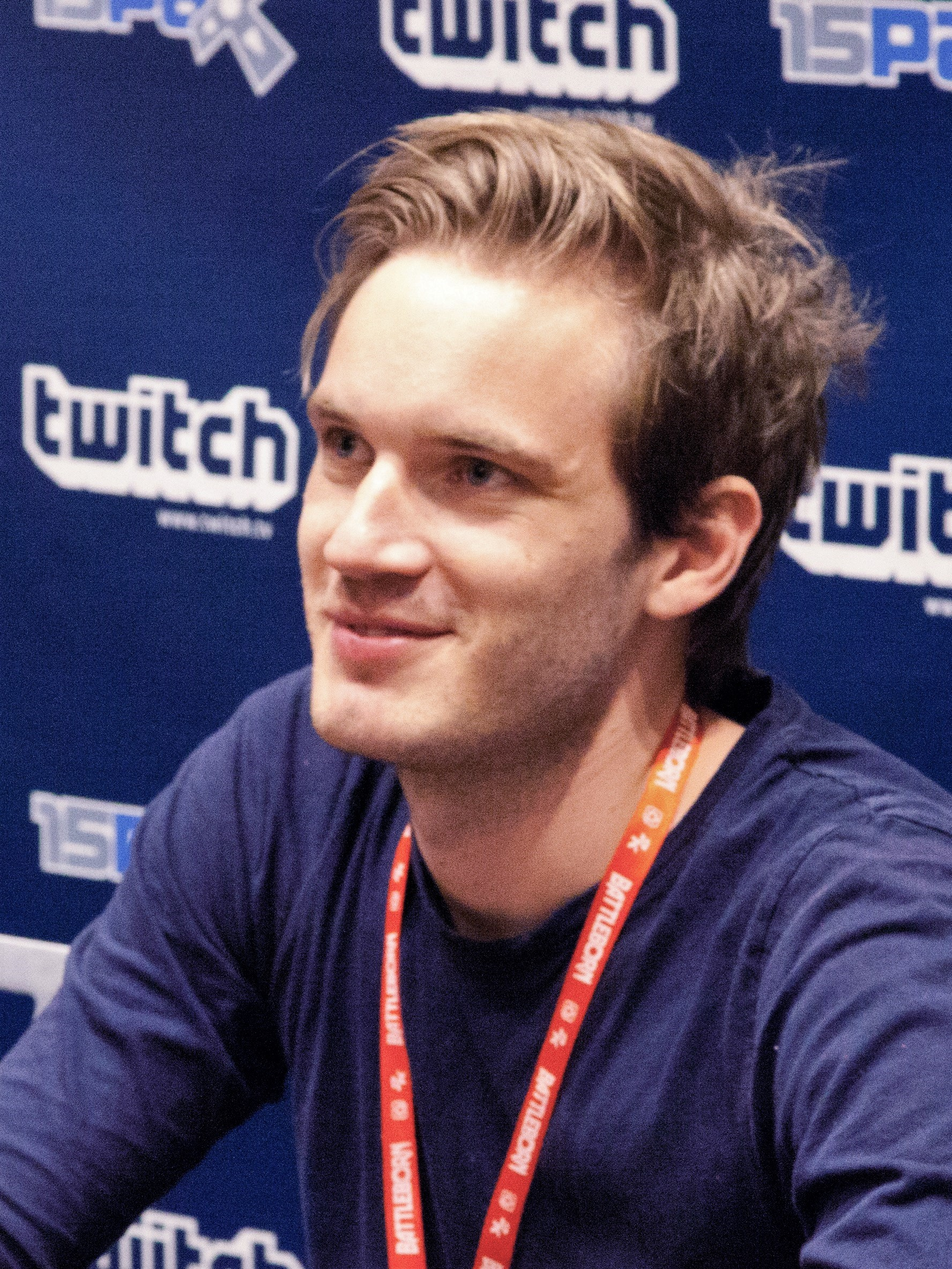
Kjellberg at PAX in 2015

The New York Times retrospectively noted that around 2015, Kjellberg's video content experienced a change in style: "He began to take more risks. He continued playing video games, but he started experimenting. He did viral challenges, made fun of other YouTubers, and reviewed meme submissions from his fans." Kjellberg has attributed his content around this time as a result of immaturity, boredom with playing video games, YouTube's platform incentives, and the belief that his channel's growth had plateaued. One video cited as being representative of this change featured Kjellberg reading erotic fan fiction about characters from the Disney film Frozen. Bob Iger, then the CEO of The Walt Disney Company, was reportedly angered by the video, putting Kjellberg's deal with Maker in jeopardy.

On 6 September 2015, his YouTube account became the first to surpass 10 billion video views. Later in the month, Kjellberg teased about having a role in a web television series, stating that he was in Los Angeles for the show's shooting. It was later announced that the series would be a YouTube Red original series, titled Scare PewDiePie. The series premiered the following February.

In January 2016, Kjellberg announced a partnership with Maker Studios to produce Revelmode, a sub-network of Maker, that would showcase Kjellberg and his friends on YouTube in original series. After the deal, the head of Maker Studios, Courtney Holt, stated, "we're thrilled to be doubling down with Felix." Along with Kjellberg, eight other YouTubers signed to the network upon its creation: CinnamonToastKen, Marzia, Dodger, Emma Blackery, Jacksepticeye, Jelly, Kwebbelkop, and Markiplier. Three YouTubers – Cryaotic, KickThePJ, and Slogoman – would later join the sub-network after its launch.

Throughout 2016, Kjellberg's video style change became more apparent. While producing fewer Let's Play videos about horror games, his style of humour changed; he commented that he had shifted to drier humour, which was often not understood by younger viewers. He examined his older videos, and while noting the stylistic changes he had undergone, he expressed specific regret for his casual use of words like gay or retarded in a derogatory sense.

On 2 December 2016, he uploaded a video discussing his frustration with the issue of YouTube accounts experiencing an unexplained loss of subscribers and views. Kjellberg stated that many people working with YouTube "have no idea of the struggles that came with being a content creator." A Google representative issued a statement to Ars Technica, stating that no decreases in subscriber numbers were out of the ordinary. Kjellberg's video was uploaded as his channel approached 50 million subscribers, and he stated he would delete his channel once it reached the milestone. On 8 December, his channel reached 50 million subscribers, becoming the first YouTube channel to do so. He shortly thereafter received a custom Play Button from YouTube as a reward for reaching this milestone. Ultimately, Kjellberg did not delete his PewDiePie channel, and instead deleted a smaller second channel he had then-recently created. His threat to quit was also reported to be "in fact, a promotional stunt" for Scare PewDiePie.

Kjellberg nevertheless continued to express discontent with the platform, aiming further criticism at YouTube's changing algorithm negatively affecting viewership for content creators. The site's algorithm began to focus on watch time statistics and "favor videos that drew daily viewers, higher engagement (more likes and comments) and cleaner 'ad-friendly' fare." Kjellberg later recounted to The New York Times that the platform's boundaries were widely unknown to creators. He responded to the algorithm changes by uploading vlogs that "mixed earnest schmaltz [...] with inanity." Additionally, he "enjoyed wading into the meme culture and edgelord humor that accompanied Donald Trump's ascent".

During this late 2016 and early 2017 period Kjellberg uploaded a string of videos addressing what Kjellberg saw as negative effects to content creator viewership caused by the new algorithm. As a satirical knock on the changing algorithms, Kjellberg made several videos asking viewers to help the video reach specific engagement milestones such as one million likes, dislikes, and comments. The videos were successful, promptly achieving the goal Kjellberg requested from viewers; the dislike video had accumulated over 5 million dislikes before YouTube made such figures private in November 2021, becoming one of the most-disliked on the entire platform.

=== 2017–2018: Media controversies and formatted shows ===
"I've made some jokes that people don't like. And you know what? If people don't like my jokes, I fully respect that. I fully understand that. I acknowledge that I took things too far, and that's something I definitely will keep in mind moving forward, but the reaction and the outrage have been nothing but insanity."

— Felix Kjellberg, My Response video, February 2017 (relating to Fiverr controversy)

In a video posted in January 2017, Kjellberg featured two paid individuals on Fiverr, asked to hold a sign that read "Death to all Jews". He alleged his intent was not antisemitic in nature, but to showcase how "crazy" the modern world and website were. The following month, The Wall Street Journal published an article alleging that this was not the first time Kjellberg had used antisemitic language and imagery in his videos. Following the Journal's article, Kjellberg received considerable media backlash, with various publications writing critically of his defense that his content was humor taken out of context, and some opining that his content helps normalise ideologies such as fascism, neo-Nazism, and white supremacy. While Kjellberg and the two individuals later apologised, the event led Maker Studios to cut their ties with Kjellberg and Google to drop him from the Google Preferred advertising program and cancel the upcoming second season of the Scare PewDiePie YouTube Red series. While Kjellberg did offer a mea culpa and distanced himself from hate speech, he also strongly rebuked media coverage of the event, with particular criticism aimed at The Wall Street Journal for how their reporting portrayed his references to Nazis in some of his videos. The Wall Street Journal defended its reporting and responded that Kjellberg did not address other videos identified by the Journal, such as Kjellberg's reaction to the Fiverr suspension of a Jesus Christ impersonator who stated "Hitler did absolutely nothing wrong", wherein Kjellberg criticised Israel-based Fiverr for the suspension and joked, "Isn't it ironic that Jews found another way to fuck Jesus over?"

According to Social Blade, his channel's total view count was surpassed by the Indian record label T-Series at the top of YouTube's view rankings on 14 February.

In September, while Kjellberg was live-streaming gameplay of PlayerUnknown's Battlegrounds to his YouTube channel, he used the racial slur "nigger" towards another player in the game. The video clip of the incident quickly went viral despite Kjellberg deleting it, and garnered widespread criticism across the internet. Kjellberg later apologised for the incident in a short video uploaded to his YouTube channel. As a response to the incident, Campo Santo co-founder Sean Vanaman referred to Kjellberg as "worse than a closeted racist", announced that Campo Santo would file copyright strikes against Kjellberg's videos featuring the studio's game Firewatch, and encouraged other game developers to do the same. Amidst the controversy stirred up by the incident, it was brought to light that Kjellberg was following several prominent far-right and white supremacist figures on Twitter, such as Stefan Molyneux, Carl Benjamin and Lauren Southern. He later deactivated his Twitter account and unfollowed everyone he was previously following, stating "What I don't like is the constant posturing that goes on there. People just can't seem to help themselves from pointing out what is good and what is bad, or how others are bad and you are good."

In 2018, Paul MacInnes of The Guardian wrote about Kjellberg's YouTube content; he noted that each week Kjellberg posted videos featuring one of three series formats, comparing this uploading pattern to television programming. The three series listed were You Laugh You Lose, which features Kjellberg watching humorous video clips while trying to not laugh; Last Week I Asked You (LWIAY), having begun as a parody and homage to Jack Douglass' Yesterday I Asked You (YIAY), where he challenges his audience to create content and reviews the output; and Meme Review, in which he reviews popular Internet memes. Kjellberg began a book club-styled series, with his own enjoyment with the series also being noted. Kjellberg began Pew News, a satirical series where he presents and discusses recent news stories while in-character, often as fictional characters named after CNN hosts, such as Gloria Borger, Poppy Harlow, or Mary Katharine Ham and sometimes, an amalgamation of these names. Pew News parodies both mainstream news channels, such as CNN, and YouTube news channels, such as DramaAlert. Topics covered by Kjellberg on Pew News included culture war topics he previously avoided.

In May, Kjellberg attracted controversy for using the term "Twitch thots" in a video that featured him watching a compilation of female Twitch streamers. Alinity, a streamer featured in the video, responded by making a copyright claim against his video, which she stated was later removed by CollabDRM, a company that strikes videos on behalf of creators. Alinity stated that her reaction was caused by "the rampant sexism in online communities", arguing that Kjellberg's comments degraded women; she refused to accept Kjellberg's apology. In July, Kjellberg posted a meme with singer Demi Lovato's face; the meme jokingly referenced Lovato's struggles with addiction. The meme was posted around the same time Lovato was hospitalized after suffering an opioid overdose. As a result, he received criticism from online users. Kjellberg later deleted the meme, and apologized for the incident.

In a video uploaded in early December, Kjellberg promoted several small content creators on YouTube, recommending his viewers to subscribe to them. Among those creators was "E;R", whom Kjellberg highlighted for a video essay on Netflix's Death Note. Shortly thereafter, The Verge's Julia Alexander noted that the video in question used imagery of the Charlottesville car attack to joke about the murder of Heather Heyer, and that E;R's channel included frequent use of racist, sexist, anti-semitic, and homophobic content. In December 2018, Vox reported that "E;R" also contained white supremacist messaging. After online criticism, he described his posting as an "oopsie" and asserted that he had posted it "recommending someone for their anime review", rather than any intention to promote antisemitism. Kjellberg said he was largely unaware of E;R's content apart from the Death Note video essay, revoked his recommendation of the channel, and edited his video to remove the reference.

=== 2018–2019: Subscriber competition with T-Series ===
In September 2018, Kjellberg uploaded a LWIAY video discussing Indian record label T-Series' YouTube channel being projected to surpass his in subscribers. On 5 October, Kjellberg uploaded "Bitch Lasagna", a diss track against the label in response to their YouTube channel being projected to surpass his in subscribers. The video went on to become Kjellberg's most-viewed video, a title formerly held by "A Funny Montage". It included some lines mocking the Indian background of T-Series, which were described as racist in media publications. On the prospect of being surpassed by T-Series in terms of subscriber count, he stated he was not concerned about T-Series, but feared the consequences a corporate channel surpassing him would have for YouTube as a video-sharing platform. Online campaigns to "subscribe to PewDiePie" greatly assisted Kjellberg's subscriber growth; his channel gained 6.62 million subscribers in December 2018 alone, compared to the 7 million subscribers gained in all of 2017.

On 12 March, Kjellberg uploaded an episode of his show Pew News in which he mentioned the 2019 Pulwama terrorist attack, where 40 Indian paramilitary troops were killed by a member of a Pakistan-based jihadist group. Following the attack, T-Series removed several songs by Pakistani artists on its YouTube channel after being pressured by political party MNS to isolate Pakistani artists, a course of action that Kjellberg disagreed with. The outlet Zee News reported that Kjellberg "faced strong criticism for his comments on the heightened tension between Pakistan and India in [the] March 12 issue of Pew News". Kjellberg issued a clarification on Twitter, expressing that he was not attempting to speak on the broader India–Pakistan relations, but rather on the more specific context of T-Series removing artists' songs from its YouTube channel.

On 15 March, the perpetrator of the live-streamed Christchurch mosque shootings said "remember lads, subscribe to PewDiePie" before carrying out the attacks. In response, Kjellberg tweeted his disgust after having his name associated with the attack, and offered condolences to those affected by the tragedy. Various journalists covering the shooting reported that Kjellberg was not complicit with the shootings. The New York Times suggested that Kjellberg's mention in the shootings was a ploy for the news media to attribute blame to Kjellberg, and to otherwise inflame political tensions.

After briefly gaining the title several times in early 2019, on 27 March, T-Series surpassed Kjellberg in subscribers to become the most-subscribed channel on YouTube. On 31 March, Kjellberg posted another diss track music video, titled "Congratulations", sarcastically congratulating T-Series for obtaining the title. In the music video, Kjellberg mocked T-Series and its actions, alleging T-Series was founded to sell pirated songs and mocking them for sending him a cease and desist letter after "Bitch Lasagna". Following the video's release, Kjellberg temporarily regained the most-subscribed position over T-Series.

On 11 April, T-Series started to seek court orders to remove Kjellberg's "diss tracks" from YouTube. The alleged court order was ruled in favor of T-Series. It was allegedly stated that the complaint against Kjellberg claimed that his songs were "defamatory, disparaging, insulting, and offensive", and noted that comments on the videos were "abusive, vulgar, and also racist in nature." Access to the music videos on YouTube was later blocked in India. The two parties were reported to have come to a settlement later that July, although Kjellberg's videos remained blocked in India. On 28 April, Kjellberg uploaded a video entitled "Ending the Subscribe to Pewdiepie Meme" in which he asked his followers to refrain from using the phrase "Subscribe to PewDiePie", due to incidents such as the phrase being graffitied on a war memorial, and its mention by the Christchurch mosque shooter. While live streaming the following day, Kjellberg showed a plane flying over New York City with a banner attached saying "Subscribe to PewDiePie", and called it "a nice little wrap up" to the meme.

=== 2019–2020: Minecraft series, milestones, and other controversies ===
In early June 2019, Kjellberg uploaded a video on YouTube sponsored by social media application Nimses. The app spiked in popularity after he promoted it on his YouTube channel. Controversy ensued when Nimses' location features and privacy settings led fans of Kjellberg and fellow YouTubers to believe that he was promoting a privacy-invasive app, with some fans suspecting the app of being a pyramid scheme due to a referral program in the app that offered more in-application currency. The Pirate Party Germany criticized his promotion of Nimses, warning that Kjellberg was promoting a potentially harmful app to a large audience. Andrey Boborykin, the head of marketing and communications at Nimses, published a blog post denying the allegations that the app is privacy-invasive. Kjellberg responded to the allegations in a video, dismissing them as "rumors", and claimed that Nimses was no more invasive than other social media apps.

Soon after his Nimses controversy, Kjellberg made a return to consistent gaming uploads, prompting his channel to experience a resurgence in views. On 21 June, Kjellberg launched Gaming Week, where he focused on uploading Let's Play videos every day, for the first time in several years. Among the games played was Minecraft, which he was openly surprised by how much he enjoyed it. Kjellberg largely centered his videos around Minecraft in the following months, with the content featured in his Meme Review and LWIAY series also becoming focused on the game. Although he had played Minecraft early in his YouTube career, he had very rarely played it in the following years due to his reluctance to join the trend of Minecraft YouTubers, who he felt only played the game because of its popularity rather than for their enjoyment. Kjellberg's lean into Minecraft was largely successful for his channel, which received a considerable surge in views and subscribers. Despite this success, Kjellberg insisted that he played the game for his enjoyment, and did not want to become solely a "Minecraft YouTuber", stating, "If Minecraft gets boring, I can just move on to other things." On 25 August, Kjellberg became the first individual YouTuber to surpass 100 million subscribers. His channel was the second overall to reach the milestone, after T-Series, who passed the mark earlier in the year. YouTube tweeted a congratulatory post to note the occurrence, and awarded him a Red Diamond Play Button.

In celebration of receiving his 100 million subscribers Play Button in September 2019, Kjellberg announced in a video that he was donating $50,000 to the Anti-Defamation League (ADL), an international Jewish non-governmental organization. The donation was made possible through Kjellberg's sponsorship deal with Honey. Part of Kjellberg's fanbase criticized his decision, citing controversial actions and stances of the ADL. Kotaku and Vice praised Kjellberg's donation and were critical of the portion of his fanbase who opposed the donation. Two days after his initial announcement, Kjellberg announced in another video that he had decided to withdraw his donation. He expressed that he was advised to donate to the ADL, and did not hand-pick an organization that he was passionate about, as he had done with previous donations. Additionally, he confirmed that he would still make a $50,000 donation to an organization at some point in the future, but after undergoing his usual process to select a suitable one.

In November, Business Insider reported Kjellberg as a client of Re6l, a Toronto-based influencer media and ecommerce company. Toward the end of the year, Kjellberg announced that he would take a break from YouTube the following year and deleted his Twitter account because of his dissatisfaction with the site. Kjellberg's hiatus ultimately proved to be brief, lasting a little over a month during early 2020. Taking short breaks from creating online content proved to become a behavior he would repeat throughout the following years. In his first video uploaded following his brief hiatus, Kjellberg made jokes about the COVID-19 pandemic and spoke in mock-Chinese phrases. After receiving criticism for these jokes, Kjellberg uploaded another video, defending his previous jokes and making further jokes about COVID-19.

Kjellberg signed an exclusive deal to stream on YouTube in May, as the platform was enrolling high-profile streamers to rival competitors like Twitch and Mixer. In October, Kjellberg's fans began to suspect his channel was shadowbanned, after noticing it and his recent uploads failed to appear in YouTube's search results. YouTube responded to the shadowban allegations on Twitter, claiming that the reason for the problems was due to search results being influenced by YouTube's system somehow flagging his recent uploads, and that due to the effects of the COVID-19 pandemic, YouTube was taking longer to review videos, including Kjellberg's. YouTube apologized for the situation and stated they were "working on fixing the issue."

=== 2020–2024: Soft retirement and move to Japan ===
In November 2020, Kjellberg uploaded a Q&A video, reflecting on his YouTube career. During the video, he expressed that he views himself as "retired" from YouTube, having felt so internally since earlier in the year. He continued to upload videos fairly frequently on the platform afterwards, albeit, inconsistently. He also "committed to posting more unstructured content, like vlogs."

On 14 February 2021, Kjellberg uploaded a diss track titled "Coco" about Cocomelon, a kids-oriented channel which had been rising in subscribers for several years, and was growing by nearly two million subscribers per month. Kjellberg clarified that the children appearing in the music video were provided with a clean version of the lyrics to mime to while they were being filmed, and that their parents allowed them to participate in the video. The video was later taken down by YouTube who claimed that it violated their policies on harassment and child safety. Kjellberg stated he "[didn't] actually care about Cocomelon" and did not want the pretend-rivalry with the channel to "get out of control", as his rivalry with T-Series had previously.

"YouTube actually has become fun again for the past two years. And that's when I realized, why should I quit? It's my dream after all to do YouTube. I've worked so hard for this."

— Felix Kjellberg, September 2022 (relating to his soft retirement from YouTube)

In May 2022, Kjellberg and his wife Marzia moved from England to Japan. Much of his content following the move consisted of "vlogs about daily life around Tokyo." In September, Kjellberg explained the shift his upload philosophy underwent when he announced his "retirement" from the platform: he opted to share videos for fun, as he did when he first began uploading videos. On 14 November, MrBeast surpassed Kjellberg as the most-subscribed individual creator on YouTube. The two have been noted as contemporaries and friends, with MrBeast having previously supported the "Subscribe to PewDiePie" campaign during Kjellberg's competition with T-Series. Previously, Kjellberg answered a viewer question relating to whether MrBeast would surpass his subscriber count, replying "He definitely will ... He definitely deserves it, I hope he does it."

On 29 June 2023, Kjellberg announced he would be taking an indefinite hiatus from YouTube due to his imminent fatherhood. He would shortly thereafter return to making videos in August. In May 2024, Kjellberg expressed discontent with what he described as an "infestation" of YouTubers visiting Japan to create "obnoxious" content for attention and "hate clicks".

=== 2025−present: Continued vlogs about family life and hobbies ===
Heading into 2025, Kjellberg's channel was "adapted into more lifestyle blogging and the occasional hobby vlog". In November 2025, Kjellberg announced in a mail newsletter that he was done making content about video games for the time being. In April 2026, Kjellberg announced he would stop featuring his son in his family vlogs, expressing that he would like his son to decide for himself if he wants to appear in such videos in the future.

== YouTube content ==
=== Style ===
An example of Kjellberg's YouTube content. It shows him playing the video game Slender: The Eight Pages, before getting jumpscared by the Slender Man. Slender would then go viral shortly after his Let's Play video.

Early in his career, Kjellberg's content mainly consisted of Let's Play videos. His commentaries of horror games made up his best-known content during this early stage, although he eventually expanded into other genres. Unlike conventional walkthroughs, Kjellberg devoted his Let's Play videos to communicating more personally with his audience. Variety detailed that Kjellberg "acts like he's spending time with a friend. He begins each video introducing himself in a high-pitched, goofy voice, drawing out the vowels of his YouTube moniker, then delves into the videos."

Known for his idiosyncratic sense of humor, the nature of his video content has been described by various outlets as goofy, energetic, and obnoxious, yet genuine and unfiltered. Lev Grossman of Time noted that "he's totally unpolished, but at the same time his timing is consistently spot-on," adding that "most of the critical literature about PewDiePie focuses on the bad language and crude physical humor–and admittedly there are a lot of both–and the fact that he is, at the end of the day, just a guy playing video games and yelling." Rob Walker of Yahoo! wrote Kjellberg's "chosen mode of sharing his critique happens to be ribald entertainment, an unmediated stream of blurted jokes, startled yelps, goofy voices, politically incorrect comments, and pretty much nonstop profanity." Occasionally, Kjellberg was emotional or silent in his commentary, having his Let's Plays resort to just gameplay. His playthrough of The Last of Us was detailed to leave the usually vocal gamer speechless at its ending.

With his channel's growth, Kjellberg's content has become more diverse; in addition to traditional Let's Play videos, he has uploaded content including vlogs, comedy shorts, and formatted shows. As aforementioned, media writers noted this change in Kjellberg's content in the mid-2010s, stating his content began to embrace and touch on meme culture, while also describing his videos as more experimental. In December 2016, Kotaku's Patricia Hernandez wrote about his stylistic changes, explaining that "over the last year, the PewDiePie channel has also had an underlying friction, as Kjellberg slowly distances himself from many of the things that made him famous. He's doing fewer Let's Plays of horror games like Amnesia," and adding, "the PewDiePie of 2016 can still be immature, sure, but [...] a defining aspect of recent PewDiePie videos is existential angst, as he describes the bleak reality of making content for a machine he cannot fully control or understand." In 2017, Justin Charity of The Ringer stated, "PewDiePie isn't a comedian in any conventional sense," but described his "hosting style [as] loopy and irreverent in the extreme: He's a little bit stand-up, a little bit shock jock, a little bit 4chan bottom-feeder."

Toward the end of the 2010s, he began uploading much reaction-style content, such as his late 2018 and early 2019 videos reacting to various compilations of TikTok videos. Kjellberg has also uploaded music onto his channel, often accompanied by animation, fan art, or live footage. Oftentimes, music videos uploaded onto his channel are collaborative in nature, as he has worked with artists such as The Gregory Brothers (also known as Schmoyoho), Boyinaband, Roomie, and Party In Backyard.

=== Production and output ===
During the early portion of his YouTube career, Kjellberg did not hire any editor or outside assistance to help with his video output, stating he wanted "YouTube to be YouTube." While his early videos would simply feature raw footage, he later began to dedicate time to edit his videos. Swedish magazine Icon noted his use of the Adobe Premiere Pro editing software. On separate occasions, he later sought an editor and a production assistant to help with his content creation. Although now having an editor for his videos, in a 2017 video, he maintained that "I'm just a guy. It's literally just me. There's not a producer out there [...] there's no writer, there's no camera guy." In July of that same year, Kjellberg commented that a couple of months prior, he had an office and a limited number of employees assisting him with his content creation.

Kjellberg has been noted by both himself and media outlets as prolific on the platform, having uploaded videos with a high frequency. In March 2012, Swedish newspaper Expressen reported that Kjellberg had uploaded at least one video per day for the seven months preceding their report. In March 2014, he adjusted his video production output, announcing he would be scaling down the frequency of uploads. By early 2017, he had uploaded almost 3,500 videos to his channel, around 400 of which have been made private. As a result, Kjellberg has made videos and statements expressing his feelings of burnout from frequently creating content for the platform and its effect on his mental health. In March 2017, Kjellberg commented that his channel was running on a daily output, stating, "[there's] a lot of challenges in doing daily content, [...] but I still really, really love the daily challenge—the daily grind—of just being like, 'hey, I'm gonna make a video today, no matter what.' And sometimes it really works, and sometimes it doesn't."

=== Subscribers and viewership ===
An interesting note about Kjellberg's rise to fame: he never really had a video go viral. He just ground it out, slow and steady, growing subscriber by subscriber.

— Lev Grossman, Time (2016)

Media writers have noted that Kjellberg's content has been largely built up "methodically," as opposed to him having risen to fame through a viral video. At the same time, the growth of Kjellberg's channel has been described as rapid by various sources; Douglas Holt of the Harvard Business Review commented that "the power of crowdculture propelled [Kjellberg] to global fame and influence in record time." Many close to Kjellberg have described him as "steadfastly loyal to his YouTube audience," with one calling him "a little spectrumy" in this regard.

By December 2011, Kjellberg's channel had around 60,000 subscribers, and on 9 May 2012, it reached 500,000 subscribers. Expressen noted that Kjellberg's channel accumulated 71 million total video views by March 2012, with 25 million coming in February 2012 alone. The channel reached 1 million subscribers in July, and 2 million subscribers in September.

Throughout 2012 and 2013, Kjellberg's channel was one of the fastest-growing on YouTube, in terms of subscribers gained. On 18 February, Kjellberg's channel reached 5 million subscribers, and in April, he was covered in The New York Times after surpassing 6 million subscribers. In July, he overtook Jenna Marbles to become the second-most-subscribed YouTube user, before reaching 10 million subscribers on 9 July. Kjellberg's subscriber count then surpassed that of the leading channel, Smosh, on 15 August. On 31 October, his channel became the first to reach 15 million subscribers. Shortly after, PewDiePie was surpassed by YouTube's Spotlight channel in subscribers. After jostling for the top position during the next month, PewDiePie's channel took firm hold of the most-subscribed title on 23 December. Ultimately, in 2013, the channel grew from 3.5 million to just under 19 million subscribers. By the end of the year, it was gaining a new subscriber every 1.037 seconds, with Billboard reporting that Kjellberg's channel gained more subscribers than any other in 2013. The year also proved to be successful for Kjellberg's viewership. In June, Tubefilter began a monthly listing of the most-viewed YouTube channels, which Kjellberg consistently topped, ranking #1 in June, July, August, October, and December of that year. Analyzing Tubefilter's data, The Guardian reported that Kjellberg's channel earned 1.3 billion video views in the second half of 2013. The channel had two of the ten most-viewed gaming videos in 2013: the sixth part of his Mad Father Let's Play was the third-most viewed of the year, earning 27 million views, and an entry in his Funny Gaming Montage series ranked as the eight-most viewed gaming video of 2013.

On 9 January 2014, the channel reached the 20 million subscriber milestone. During that year, Kjellberg's channel was the most-viewed in January, and then for seven consecutive months from March to September, according to Tubefilter. According to Social Blade, Kjellberg's channel surpassed emimusic on 29 December 2014, at over 7.2 billion views, to become the most-viewed channel on the website. According to Tubefilter and The Guardian, the channel amassed nearly 14 million new subscribers and around 4.1 billion video views in 2014; both figures were higher than any other user. The latter figure was a reported 81% increase from the channel's video views in 2013; the channel was the most viewed in that year, as well.

During July 2015, Kjellberg's videos were documented to receive over 300 million views per month. It eclipsed the 10 billion video view milestone on 6 September, becoming the first channel to do so. At that time, "A Funny Montage" (then-titled "Funny Montage #1") was Kjellberg's most-viewed video, with approximately 68.8 million views; a partial reason it accumulated many views was due to its status as the PewDiePie channel trailer.

In 2016, the channel experienced decreased viewership, which was similarly experienced by other content creators across the platform, due to changes in YouTube's algorithm. On 8 December, it reached 50 million subscribers, becoming the first YouTube channel to do so. Online campaigns to "subscribe to PewDiePie" during Kjellberg's feud with T-Series greatly assisted his channel's subscriber growth; his channel gained 6.62 million subscribers in December 2018 alone, compared to the 7 million subscribers gained in all of 2017. Renewed interest in Kjellberg's videos due to his subscriber competition with T-Series resulted in his channel earning over 500 million video views in December 2018, which was then the channel's single-highest monthly view count. After briefly gaining the title several times in early 2019, on 27 March, T-Series surpassed Kjellberg in subscribers to become the most-subscribed channel on YouTube. The day after "Congratulations" was uploaded, Kjellberg temporarily regained his lead over T-Series as the most subscribed channel.

In July 2019, in large part due to Kjellberg's Minecraft gameplay videos, his channel surged in video views. The Verge noted that it was Kjellberg's most successful month in years, in terms of viewership. Data from Social Blade (Note: Social Blade provides statistical data for PewDiePie's channel dating as far back as April 2011.) shows the channel received 573 million video views, then a single-month record for the channel. His daily number of new subscribers also grew from 25,000 to 45,000 during that month. Kjellberg was the most-viewed creator of 2019, with his channel receiving over 4 billion views during the year.

Along with T-Series, PewDiePie was one of only two YouTube channels to receive all five tiers of YouTube Creator Awards: Silver, Gold, Diamond, Custom, and Red Diamond Creator. These awards are earned upon surpassing the 100,000; 1 million; 10 million; 50 million; and 100 million subscriber milestones, respectively. Kjellberg nicknamed his Custom Creator Award the Ruby Play Button, which he received in 2016. In 2019, Kjellberg's channel became the second overall, and the first run by an individual creator, to receive the Red Diamond Creator Award.

Heading into the 2020s, PewDiePie's subscriber growth began to stagnate, with his channel remaining static at 111 million subscribers that was reached on December 2021 before declining to 110 million by October 2024. Kjellberg's channel remained as one of the top ten most-subscribed until June 2025, with his channel's absence from the platform's short-form content scene resulting in it being outpaced by other creators. On August 30, 2026, PewDiePie's channel fell to 109 million subscribers.

=== Sponsorships ===
Beginning in April 2014 and spanning into August, Kjellberg, along with his then-girlfriend Marzia, began a marketing campaign for the Legendary Pictures film As Above, So Below. Kjellberg's videos for the marketing campaign included a miniseries featuring him participating in the "Catacombs Challenge". The challenge involved Kjellberg searching for three keys in the catacombs to open a container holding "the Philosopher's stone". The couple's videos were able to earn nearly 20 million views. Maker Studios, which both Kjellberg and Marzia were represented by, brokered the ad deal between the two and Legendary Pictures. In January 2015, Mountain Dew partnered with Kjellberg to launch a fan fiction contest, in which winning fan fiction will be animated into video formats and then uploaded onto his channel.

While he entered partnerships early in his YouTube career, Kjellberg maintained that he worked with few brands and conducted few promotions. He stated he felt he made enough money from YouTube and found endorsing too many brands to be disrespectful to his fans. On this topic, Kjellberg has expressed disappointment when a sizable portion of people misinterpret his intentions; he stated, "if I mention on Twitter that I find this or that Kickstarter project cool, people immediately start to ask what economical interests I might have in it." Eventually, Kjellberg began to work with more brands, stating that he wanted to have a genuine relationship with brands and added he was lucky to not be dependent on working with them to support his career. In January 2019, Kjellberg announced a partnership with energy drink company G Fuel.

=== Critical reception ===
Kjellberg's YouTube content has been met with mixed critical reception. Media outlets write that he is one of the most popular creators online, despite being involved in multiple media controversies. His content has been described by various outlets as goofy, energetic, and filled with profanity, and his on-camera personality has been generally received as genuine, unfiltered, and self-aware by various outlets.

In regards to his early Let's Play content, Swedish columnist Lars Lindstrom commented positively, stating that "Felix Kjellberg [having] a comic talent is indisputable. It is both amazingly awful and amazingly funny when a father bikes around with his son in the game Happy Wheels and both get crushed and bloody again and again and PewDiePie improvises absurd comments as the game continues. The secret is that he loves to play these games and that he has fun doing it." Lev Grossman of Time noted that "he's totally unpolished, but at the same time his timing is consistently spot-on," adding that "most of the critical literature about PewDiePie focuses on the bad language and crude physical humor–and admittedly there are a lot of both–and the fact that he is, at the end of the day, just a guy playing video games and yelling." Kjellberg's early content also garnered some negative media reception, with detractors describing it as "obnoxious" and often reporting his popularity as an "inexplicable phenomenon". Andrew Wallenstein of Variety heavily criticised Kjellberg, following his channel becoming the most-subscribed on YouTube, describing his videos as "aggressive stupidity" and "psychobabble."

Following the controversy regarding alleged antisemitic content in his videos, many media publications both in and outside of the gaming and tech industries severely criticised Kjellberg's content. These outlets suggested that Kjellberg's content contained and promoted fascist, white supremacist, and alt-right ideologies. A Wired article covering the controversy referred to him as a "poster boy for white supremacists". Charity opined that Kjellberg's "occasional, reactionary irreverence has become a core component of his appeal. Likewise, for critics and fans who value inclusivity — and among outside observers who view [Kjellberg]'s conduct as inexplicably frequent in the news — [Kjellberg] represents all that is wrong and alienating about games culture."

=== Censorship ===
In April 2019, "Congratulations" and "Bitch Lasagna" were banned in India when the Delhi High Court granted an injunction in favor of T-Series. The complaint against Kjellberg allegedly stated that his songs were "defamatory, disparaging, insulting, and offensive," and noted that comments on the videos were "abusive, vulgar, and also racist in nature." Although both parties came to a settlement later in the year, Kjellberg's videos remain blocked in India.

On 16 October 2019, Kjellberg uploaded an episode of his Meme Review series, in which he reacted to memes about the 2019–20 Hong Kong protests. The video also featured his commentary on the then recent China–NBA and Blitzchung controversies, as well as memes comparing Chinese Communist Party general secretary Xi Jinping to Winnie-the-Pooh. As a result, Kjellberg's channel and content were reportedly censored in China. Kjellberg stated that content related to him on other websites, such as Reddit, had also been blocked. The BBC wrote that instead of a complete ban, only "some content related to the YouTuber has indeed been made inaccessible online," and that "there is no evidence to suggest this was done on the orders of the government." The BBC suggested that Baidu seemingly removed PewDiePie-related messages on a forum out of caution, but that "a [Baidu] search for his name still returns more than eight million results." Vox wrote that "access to reposted PewDiePie videos and music" appeared to be available to some regional users.

According to Business Insider, "For years, critics of Pewds have been campaigning for YouTube to bar him from the platform to no avail."

== Public image and influence ==
Since breaking through on YouTube with his Let's Play-styled videos, Kjellberg has emerged as one of the most noted, influential, and controversial online personalities. He has also been cited by various publications as largely influential for digital content creation and Internet culture, particularly relating to video gaming subcultures. Eurogamer noted that Kjellberg was cast by media reports as a "figurehead" of YouTubers, and for being nearly synonymous with gaming YouTubers in general. In 2016, Douglas Holt of Harvard Business Review wrote of Kjellberg as "YouTube's greatest success", and regarded him, about gaming subcultures, "the star of this digital art world—just as Jean-Michel Basquiat and Patti Smith had done in urban art worlds back in the analog days". Lev Grossman of Time wrote that Kjellberg dominated "an entire medium single-handed," and pioneered "a new form of fame not controlled or manufactured by a studio or a network."

Kjellberg has stated that he dislikes being called "famous". In a 2014 interview with The Wall Street Journal, he called the influence he has "kind of scary". In a Rolling Stone article, Kjellberg admitted to being shocked by his fame; he recalled a gaming event near his hometown, stating "I remember there were five security guards yelling at a crowd to back up – it was out of control. It was shocking to find myself in that situation, where I was that celebrity person." In a 2019 interview with the New York Times, Kjellberg commented on his influence stating, "it's weird for me to be in this position because I don't really want to be in this position." He went on to express feelings of nostalgia for his early YouTube career, when he had fewer subscribers, and admitted to periodically thinking about giving up the platform altogether. Colleagues and media have referred to Kjellberg as "normally press shy", "quiet", and "much more reserved in real life." After moving to Japan, Kjellberg expressed enjoying a lack of recognition while in public.

=== Media analysis as a YouTube personality ===
In September 2014, Walker called Kjellberg's popularity "insane", writing that it "strikes me as considerably more curious – I mean, you know who Rihanna is, but would you recognize this kid if he was standing in line behind you at the bank?" Walker, among other reporters, questioned and analysed reasons for his popularity. Nevertheless, Walker commented positively on Kjellberg's intelligence, stating the YouTuber is "clearly" smart based on when he speaks directly to his audience. Other writers have shared similar sentiments; Grossman described Kjellberg as "articulate", while The Verge's Ben Popper has noted Kjellberg as being "self conscious". In 2015, Ross Miller of The Verge wrote, "Love it or hate it, his success – like so many other YouTube personalities – isn't just in playing games but actually connecting and talking directly to an audience. No agent, press release, or any other intermediary. He just hit record." Profiling Kjellberg and analyzing the YouTuber's career through 2019, Kevin Roose of The New York Times wrote that during the period in which Kjellberg had the most-subscribed channel but still prior to his alleged antisemitism controversy, he "was not just the YouTuber with the biggest channel. To many Inner YouTubers, he represented the values of the platform — lo-fi, authentic, defiantly weird."

In the wake of the Wall Street Journal controversy, John Herman of The New York Times commented that "[Kjellberg] bemoaned [YouTube's] structure and the way it had changed; he balked at its limits and took joy in causing offense and flouting rules. Over time, he grew into an unlikely, disorienting, and insistently unserious political identity: He became YouTube's very own populist reactionary." YouTube's chief business officer Robert Kyncl stated Kjellberg "underestimated the responsibility he had as the platform's most popular ambassador, even if he himself is not a hateful person."

In 2018, Paul MacInnes of The Guardian wrote, "Given the scale of his audience and his influence, not much is written about PewDiePie. Tech sites like The Verge and Polygon report on him and often critique him severely. But in the mainstream media, his name has broken through only either as a result of novelty or scandal," and noted that his content was rarely written about. Touching on Kjellberg's alleged antisemitic controversy, MacInnes also added that he "is funny, intelligent, innovative and highly charismatic [...] to call him an alt-right agitator would perhaps be unfair as he has never publicly identified with the proto-fascist movement. But he shares much of their culture and amplifies it across the world. People should pay PewDiePie more attention." Max Read of Intelligencer also retrospectively opined on Kjellberg's alleged antisemitic controversy, commenting that "Kjellberg, for his part, is seen as a standard-bearer for the oppressed YouTuber subject to the whims of YouTube's corporate masters — a symbol of the ongoing tension between YouTube and the culture that it spawned," and added that "he, through fights over his behavior and his position within the YouTube space, is something like a gateway drug to bigger political battles over free speech, the role of media, and diversity."

Abby Ohlheiser of The Washington Post stated Kjellberg "became a symbolic figure" in relation to the online culture war around "political correctness" following the 2017 Wall Street Journal article, but that following the 2019 Christchurch shooting, his "behavior has suggested that he more deeply understands the war he began fighting two years ago". Ohlheiser added that Kjellberg shifted away from "making angry, anti-PC commentary videos", instead maturing by going "back to his roots" as he "found joy in playing Minecraft". Shortly prior to his 2020 hiatus, Erin Nyren of Variety commented that Kjellberg's "popularity continues unabated in spite of—or perhaps because of—the fact that he has been the subject of ongoing controversies."

=== Media lists and rankings ===
Kjellberg's influence has ranked highly on various lists. Subtitled as the "King of YouTube" on The Verge's 2014 "Verge 50" list—the outlet's "definitive list of the most interesting people building the future." On his listing's blurb, The Verge wrote that "Kjellberg's real talent is finding the human within games. He's just a normal person, finding the authentic in games for an audience that are desperate for a little more humanity." In 2015, Kjellberg was included on Time's list of the 30 most influential people on the Internet, with the publication writing that his channel "broadcasts some of the most-watched programs in pop culture." Later in 2015, Kjellberg was featured on the cover of Variety's "Famechangers" issue, with the magazine ranking him as the "#1 Famechanger", or "those whose influence stands head and shoulders above the rest".

The following year, Time included him on their Time 100 list, with South Park co-creator Trey Parker writing in his entry, "I know it might seem weird, especially to those of us from an older generation, that people would spend so much time watching someone else play video games [...] But I choose to see it as the birth of a new art form. And I don't think anyone should underestimate its most powerful artist." In 2017, Forbes did not rank Kjellberg as the top gaming influencer, citing that his "overall brand suffered earlier this year when he included antisemitic content in nine of his videos". Nevertheless, the publication still included Kjellberg in the gaming category of their June 2017 "Top Influencers" list. In September 2019, The Sunday Times ranked him first on their list of the UK's 100 most influential people online.

=== Fan base and audience ===
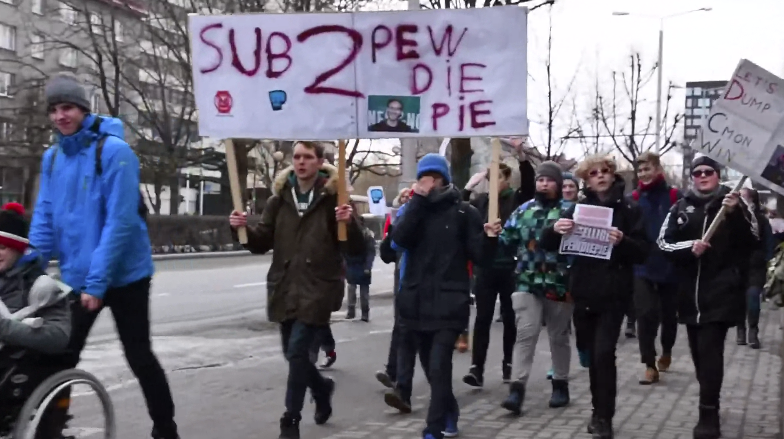
Fans demonstrate in Tallinn during the PewDiePie vs T-Series subscriber competition.

In 2015, ESPN noted that Kjellberg typically performed a "Brofist" gesture at the end of his videos, and often referred to his fan base as the "Bro Army", addressing his audience as "bros". Likewise, media outlets also adopted the name when referring to Kjellberg's fan base. Later in his YouTube career, Kjellberg stopped using the term "Bro Army", and began to refer to his audience as "Squad Fam", "9 year olds", and later "19 year olds", in his videos. The fan base has been subject to criticism; in July 2018, Wired published an article, referring to Kjellberg's fan base as "toxic", stating that "it's not just that they've stuck with the Swedish gamer/alleged comedian as he peppered his videos with racial slurs, rape jokes, antisemitism, and homophobia for nearly a decade (though that's bad enough). It's also that they insist that PewDiePie somehow isn't being hateful at all."

At the 2013 Social Star Awards in Singapore, Kjellberg greeted his fans personally despite security warning him against doing so. Kjellberg also mentioned this event to Rolling Stone, stating, "I didn't even understand they were screaming for me at first." Kjellberg has commented on fans from Malaysia and Singapore; during a trip to Kuala Lumpur in 2016, fans entered his hotel to search for him, which he expressed annoyance with. In a 2019 vlog, Kjellberg expressed that fans in Malaysia and Singapore can be "very hectic and scream-ish and crazy, and they lose their minds when they see you." He later apologized to fans from the two countries, stating that seeing the effect he had "on fans back then [during his 2013 trip to Singapore] was cool" and that he would "be lying" if he claimed to hate this initial experience with fans, although added that he has grown to not enjoy being treated as more than a person. Business Insider Singapore reported that some fans took offense to Kjellberg's comments, but that "most netizens accepted the YouTuber's apology and admitted that fans had gone overboard in invading his privacy."

Kjellberg's audience has been reported to provide positive remarks about him; some of his viewers created and contributed to a thread expressing that he has made them happier and feel better about themselves. Conversely, during an informal Twitter poll conducted by one Kotaku reporter, respondents described him as "annoying" and an "obnoxious waste of time." Additionally, Rolling Stone has documented the existence of several Reddit threads dedicated to sharing disparaging views of Kjellberg.

Relating to his responsibility to his audience, Kjellberg has stated, "many people see me as a friend they can chill with for 15 minutes a day," adding, "The loneliness in front of the computer screens brings us together. But I never set out to be a role model; I just want to invite them to come over to my place." Media writers have concurred with Kjellberg's sentiments; Rob Walker of Yahoo! commented on Kjellberg's interaction with his audience, writing, "While he can be raucous and crude, it always comes across as genuine. He constantly addresses his audience as a bunch of peer-like friends, as opposed to distant, genuflecting fans. He's certainly more than willing to make fun of himself in the process." Writing retrospectively in 2025, about Kjellberg's fan base around 2013, Tubefilter's Sam Gutelle stated that Kjellberg's "middling" gaming skills "was part of his appeal", allowing for him to be seen by viewers as a "big brother" figure.

After initially announcing his $50,000 donation to the ADL, Kjellberg mentioned that he had come to terms with his "responsibilities" as a creator. He received backlash from portions of his fan base for the donation, with some sharing conspiracies that the ADL was blackmailing Kjellberg. After Kjellberg ultimately withdrew the donation, Ohlhesier opined that "the episode shows just how difficult it will be for Felix Kjellberg, maturing adult, newly married, to untangle himself from PewDiePie, young Internet antihero, and the army that has grown to encircled him and salute him as their general.

==== Channel demographics ====
During Kjellberg's run as the most-subscribed YouTuber, his channel strongly appealed to younger viewers, a group Google referred to as "Generation C" for their habits of "creation, curation, connection and community". This generational cohort has been more commonly referred to as Generation Z by researchers and popular media. In a 2017 video, Kjellberg shared a screenshot of data provided by YouTube regarding his channel statistics, which suggested his largest demographic was among the 18–24 age group, followed by the 25–34 age group. Surveys conducted throughout the 2010s highlighted that favorable opinions of Kjellberg, as well as his name recognition and online influence within these age ranges, was comparable to that of mainstream figures such as Jennifer Lawrence, Justin Bieber, and LeBron James.

The New York Times published results of an online reader poll the publication held, showing that only 17% of their digital readers correctly identified Kjellberg after seeing an image of him; the outlet wrote that the poll's results "probably reflect the fact that Times readers are older than a representative sample of Americans, citing that "in 2015, the median digital Times subscriber was 54 years old." In 2016, Maker Studios' international chief content officer was cited in The Guardian as comparing "the average parent's bafflement at their teenage children's passion for stars like PewDiePie, KSI, and Zoella to past generations' inability to comprehend punk rock or gangsta rap."

Studies of the gaming community on YouTube have shown that 95% of video game players engage in watching online videos related to gaming, which has been linked to being an important reason for Kjellberg's popularity.

=== Influence on video games ===
Kjellberg has been noted to support video games from indie developers, often having played through such titles in his videos. His commentaries have had a positive effect on sales of indie games, with The Washington Post writing that "gamemakers have observed a kind of Oprah effect." The developers of the indie game McPixel stated, "The largest force driving attention to McPixel at that time were 'Let's Play' videos. Mostly by Jesse Cox and PewDiePie." Kjellberg has also been confirmed to have driven the popularity of Yandere Simulator during that game's development, and positively influenced the sales of Slender: The Eight Pages and Goat Simulator. Although games being featured on Kjellberg's channel have reportedly contributed to their commercial success, he has stated, "I just want to play the games, not influence sales."

In 2019, Kjellberg's Minecraft videos led a surge of interest towards the game, which saw an increase in players. It also registered the largest-trending score on YouTube since January 2017 and surpassed Fortnite as the most-searched game on YouTube, with the searches for Minecraft on Google almost doubling since previous months. Video game media outlets, such as Polygon and The Verge, largely credited this newfound success to Kjellberg, with The Verge suggesting that the surge "proves that the 'PewDiePie Effect' is still real" (about the Oprah effect-like success enjoyed by games Kjellberg has played). Several other popular YouTubers followed suit by focusing on Minecraft content. Polygon also noted that in the wake of Kjellberg's focus on Minecraft, YouTubers focused on Fortnite began to shift towards making Minecraft videos instead.

Kjellberg, along with characters from Amnesia: The Dark Descent, were referred to by a McPixel level designed in his honour. Additionally, in the video game Surgeon Simulator 2013, the Alien Surgery stage features an organ called "Pewdsball" in honour of Kjellberg. Kjellberg agreed to allow the developers of Surgeon Simulator 2013 to use his likeness in GOTY IDST, a showering simulation video game. Kjellberg was also included as an NPC in the indie game Party Hard, and had a voice acting role in Pinstripe, a puzzle adventure game.

=== Income ===
In March 2014, Kjellberg made an estimated $140,000–$1.4 million from YouTube revenue, according to Social Blade. In June 2014, The Wall Street Journal reported that Kjellberg earned $4 million in 2013; Kjellberg confirmed on Reddit that the figures were somewhat close to what he actually earned. In July 2015, the Swedish newspaper Expressen reported that Kjellberg's production company, PewDie Productions AB, reported earnings of 63.7 million SEK ($7.5 million) in 2014. In 2015, outlets described Kjellberg's income as sizeable, and even "remarkable"; Kjellberg appeared at the top of Forbes' October 2015 list of the richest YouTube stars with a reported $12 million earned in 2015.

In December 2016, Forbes named Kjellberg as the highest-earning YouTuber with his annual income reaching $15 million. This was up 20% from 2015, largely due to his YouTube Red series Scare PewDiePie and his book This Book Loves You, which sold over 112,000 copies according to Nielsen Bookscan. Kjellberg relies on external revenue sources rather than YouTube's ad model, which he has stated is common for most YouTube content creators; Kjellberg commented that YouTube's ad revenue model is inefficient, unstable, and insecure. According to Forbes, Kjellberg's income dropped to $12 million in 2017, which made him the sixth highest-paid YouTuber during that year. Forbes commented that Kjellberg's income would have been higher had he avoided the pushback from advertisers resulting from the controversies surrounding his videos in 2017.

Extensive media coverage on his earnings has been met with frustration by Kjellberg, who has stated that he is "tired of talking about how much [he makes]", and suggested that media outlets should rather report on the money he raised for charity. The Guardian commented that the reason the media was so captivated by Kjellberg's earnings is that the topic "offers a rare insight into the money being made at the top end of YouTube stardom," adding "it's very rare for any YouTube creator to talk about their earnings publicly, not least because YouTube itself does not encourage it."

== Other ventures ==
=== Streaming and content on other platforms ===
Though mostly known for his YouTube content, Kjellberg has at times streamed on other platforms. In September 2014, Kjellberg began streaming BroKen onto MLG.tv. He co-hosted the series with Kenneth Morrison, better known as CinnamonToastKen, who is also a video game commentator.

In April 2017, while still continuing to upload new content onto YouTube, Kjellberg created Netglow, a crowdsourced channel on the livestreaming service Twitch. On Netglow, he started streaming Best Club, a weekly live stream show. Best Club premiered on 9 April, with its first episode featuring Brad Smith alongside Kjellberg. Kjellberg commented that his decision to create Netglow was in the works prior to the aforementioned allegations of antisemitic themes in his videos. Business Insider detailed that Kjellberg's first stream amassed around 60,000 viewers, and that Netglow had accumulated 93,000 subscribers to that point.

On 9 April 2019, shortly before officially ending his competition with T-Series, Kjellberg announced that he would live-stream exclusively on streaming service DLive, as part of a deal with the company. Upon Kjellberg's 2020 signing to stream exclusively on YouTube, he had amassed over 800,000 followers on DLive, but due to his deal with the former, and not having streamed on the latter in four months, Tubefilter noted that it was unclear if Kjellberg was still affiliated with DLive. Kjellberg's DLive channel was eventually deactivated.

In January 2021, Kjellberg signed a distribution deal with Jellysmack, a content creation company. The deal entails Jellysmack optimizing and then distributing Kjellberg's content for a Facebook Watch audience, though Kjellberg would continue to debut his content on YouTube.

After years of inactivity, Kjellberg's "PewDiePie" Twitch account began streaming episodes of the Canadian sitcom Trailer Park Boys in March 2023. This was part of a test by the distribution and monetization service CoPilot Media, as they were on the verge of rolling out "PewDiePie Infinity", "essentially an endless loop of [Kjellberg]'s videos." On 9 May, Kjellberg's Twitch account received a ban despite only streaming this previously aired content. Kjellberg's Twitch account has received further temporary bans in July 2023 and October 2024, for ambiguous reasons.

=== Video games, authorship, and fashion design ===
On 24 September 2015, Kjellberg released his own video game, PewDiePie: Legend of the Brofist, on iOS and Android. The game was developed by Canadian game developer Outerminds in collaboration with Kjellberg. On 29 September 2016, he released another game developed by Outerminds, PewDiePie's Tuber Simulator. It was released as a free app on iOS and Android devices and reached the number one spot on the App Store within a few days of its release. On 31 October 2017, former Goat Simulator developer and lead designer Armin Ibrisagic announced his partnership with Kjellberg for his video game Animal Super Squad. Kjellberg helped Ibrisagic with the core concept of the game and provided him with feedback and creative direction. In 2019, Kjellberg released two more video games: PewDiePie's Pixelings on 15 November and Poopdie on 12 December. The latter game was rejected from the App Store due to its "crude imagery and sound effects which may disgust users", but is available on Android.

Penguin Group's Razorbill imprint released Kjellberg's This Book Loves You, a parody of self-help books, on 20 October 2015. The book is a collection of anti-proverbs paired with visuals. It was number-one on The New York Times Best Seller list for two weeks in the Young Adult Paperback category. Kjellberg and his wife Marzia launched Tsuki, a unisex clothing brand which they announced in a YouTube video.

=== Appearances in other media ===
Kjellberg discussing his decision to stop drinking on a 2019 episode of the Cold Ones podcast

Aside from his own YouTube channel, Kjellberg has made appearances in the videos of other YouTube creators. In April 2013, he made a cameo in an episode of Epic Rap Battles of History, portraying Mikhail Baryshnikov. In July 2013, he starred alongside Anthony Padilla and Ian Hecox of Smosh, as well as Jenna Marbles, as guest judges on the second season of Internet Icon. Kjellberg also appeared in YouTube's annual year-end Rewind series each year from 2013 to 2016; he once again appeared in YouTube Rewind in 2019.

On 3 June 2014, Sveriges Radio announced that Kjellberg was chosen to host his own episode of the Swedish radio show Sommar i P1. Due to his international popularity, the episode was recorded in both Swedish and English. The Swedish version was broadcast on 9 August 2014 on Sveriges Radio P1, and when the broadcast started the English version was published online. The link to the Swedish version of the broadcast was shared over 3,500 times, and the link to the English version was shared about 49,000 times.

In December 2014, Kjellberg guest-starred in two episodes of the 18th season of South Park. The two episodes served as a two-part season finale. The first part, titled "#REHASH" aired on 3 December, while the second part, titled "#HappyHolograms", aired on 10 December. In the episodes, he parodied himself and other Let's Play commentators, providing commentary over Call of Duty gameplay in an overly expressive way.

In July 2015, Kjellberg was announced as a voice actor in the Vimeo fantasy series, Oscar's Hotel for Fantastical Creatures. In October of the same year, he appeared as a guest on The Late Show with Stephen Colbert, where Colbert referred to him as "Emperor of the Internet". In February 2016, he appeared on Conan, playing Far Cry Primal as part of the show's Clueless Gamer segment. In 2019, he was a guest on the Cold Ones YouTube podcast.

== Philanthropy ==
Kjellberg's popularity has allowed him to garner support for fundraising drives. In February 2012, Kjellberg ran for King of the Web, an online contest. He lost the overall title, but still became the "Gaming King of the Web" for the 1–15 February 2012 voting period. During the following voting period, Kjellberg won and donated his cash winnings to the World Wildlife Fund. He has raised money for the St. Jude Children's Research Hospital, and began a "Water Campaign" charity, where his fans could donate money to Charity: Water, in celebration of reaching ten million subscribers. Kjellberg contributed one dollar to the charity for every 500 views the video announcing the campaign accumulated, up to a maximum of $10,000. Kjellberg had the stated goal of raising US$250,000, but at the end of the drive, the amount raised was $446,612. Kjellberg organized another charity drive for Charity: Water in February 2016. The drive raised $152,239, surpassing a $100,000 goal.

In celebration of reaching 25 million subscribers in June 2014, Kjellberg announced another charity drive for Save the Children. It raised over $630,000, surpassing a $250,000 goal. In an interview with the Swedish magazine Icon, he has expressed a desire to continue these drives as time goes on, and also credited John and Hank Green as two individuals who gave him the idea of making unique videos for charity. These videos are purchased by game manufacturers and advertisers, for prices ranging up to $50,000.

In December 2016, he hosted Cringemas, a livestream held across two days (9 and 10 December, both at around 6 pm–10 pm GMT), with other Revelmode creators. During the livestream, they helped raise money for RED, a charity committed to helping eliminate HIV/AIDS in Africa. After the first day, the fundraiser raised over $200,000, after YouTube doubled their goal of $100,000, and at the end of the livestream, they had raised a total of over $1.3 million with help from the Bill & Melinda Gates Foundation.

On 3 December 2018, Kjellberg announced that he had started a fundraiser on GoFundMe for Child Rights and You (CRY) to help Indian children, partially in response to racist comments left on his videos directed toward Indians. Kjellberg also hosted a livestream on 4 December, donating all of its proceeds to CRY. He raised over $200,000.

On 21 July 2019, Kjellberg started a fundraiser on GoFundMe with American actor Jack Black for National Alliance on Mental Illness (NAMI), in the wake of the suicide of the internet personality Etika in June 2019. Kjellberg and Jack Black streamed themselves playing Minecraft together to raise money for their fundraiser. Kjellberg donated $10,000 to his fundraiser and managed to raise over $30,000 for NAMI. Kjellberg has previously spoken on the topic of mental health, including his struggles with his own, and as part of the UK's Mental Health Awareness Week in 2017, he highlighted various resources to help one's mental health in a video.

On 31 October 2019, Kjellberg donated $69,420 to Team Trees, a fundraising drive taking action against deforestation by pledging to plant one tree for every dollar donated. The donation number is a comedic in-joke combining numbers from internet culture: 69 and 420.

In early June 2020, Kjellberg raised more than $116,000 for the Sentencing Project, victims of police brutality, and for small businesses affected by Black Lives Matter demonstrators looting and rioting after the murder of George Floyd.

Kjellberg pledged to donate money earned from his YouTube membership to various charities every month. By 2021, Kjellberg raised over $1 million to charities such as Red Nose Day, Movember, Papyrus, Blue Ocean Foundation, Save the Children Lebanon, and Winston's Wish.

== Personal life ==
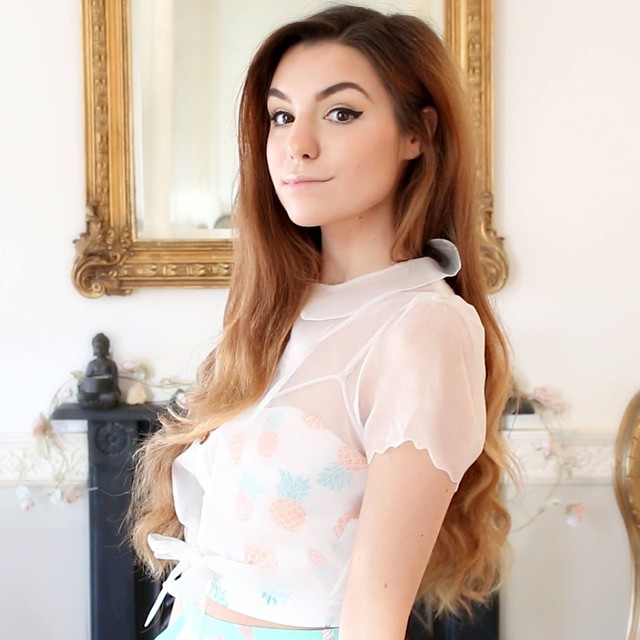
Marzia Kjellberg, Felix's wife, has featured in his videos on several occasions.

Kjellberg married his long-term Italian girlfriend Marzia Bisognin on 19 August 2019. The couple have one son, born 11 July 2023.

Kjellberg and Bisognin were introduced to each other through a friend of Bisognin's in 2011, and after establishing an online relationship, Kjellberg flew to Italy to meet her. The pair shuffled between Sweden and Italy, before settling in Brighton, England. Kjellberg explained that they moved to the UK in July 2013 for preference to live close to the sea and for better Internet connectivity. He said he enjoyed the general anonymity that living in Brighton granted him.

A 2018 trip to Japan inspired Kjellberg to move to the country. Announcing their intention to permanently move there, Kjellberg and his wife bought a home in Japan in 2019. The home was burgled in late 2019, and the couple's move was delayed due to Japan restricting relocation regulations in response to the COVID-19 pandemic. In May 2022, Kjellberg and his wife moved to their home in Japan with a 5-year business visa.

Regarding his political beliefs, Kjellberg stated in October 2019 that he is "more apolitical than anything", and that he was "somewhere in between" left-wing and right-wing. In June 2014, Kjellberg stated that he is an agnostic atheist. During the 2026 Midterm elections in the United States, a picture of Kjellberg and his family appeared in political advertisements posted by a far right student group in Arizona with the slogan being "PROTECT AMERICANS", which were amended with graffiti to say "PROTECT WHITE AMERICANS", despite the Kjellbergs not being American-born. The original image was posted on Kjellberg's Instagram in August of 2024 to celebrate their five year anniversary.

Kjellberg has frequently mentioned in videos that he adheres to a pescetarian diet for various reasons. To deal with stress stemming from his content creation workload, Kjellberg developed a daily whiskey-drinking habit. During a Cold Ones podcast interview in July 2019, Kjellberg shared that a book on Buddhism inspired him to drop the habit.

== Filmography ==
=== Television ===
Year	Series	Role	Network	Notes	Ref.
2014	South Park	Himself	Comedy Central	Cameo; 2 episodes	

=== Web ===
Year(s)	Title	Role	Episodes	Ref.
2013	Epic Rap Battles of History	Mikhail Baryshnikov	1	
2013	Internet Icon	Himself	1	
2013, 2015	Smosh Babies	Baby Pewds	2	(Note: Voice acted in "Ian's Lost Love" and "The New Teacher")
2013–2016, 2019	YouTube Rewind	Himself	5	(Note: Appeared in 2013–2016, and again in 2019: For the Record)
2014	Good Mythical Morning	Himself	1	
2014	asdfmovie	Lonely Guy / Magician	1	
2015	Oscar's Hotel for Fantastical Creatures	Brock	6	
2015	Pugatory	Edgar	6	
2016	Scare PewDiePie	Himself	10 (All)	

=== Music videos ===
Year	Title	Artist(s)	Role	Ref.
2017	"Asian Jake Paul"	iDubbbz featuring Boyinaband	Himself	

=== Video games ===
Year	Title	Role	Notes	Ref.
2017	Pinstripe	Himself	Cameo	
2021	YouTubers Life 2	Himself	Cameo	

== Ludography ==
Year	Game	Type	Platform(s)	Developer	Role / Notes	Ref.
2015	PewDiePie: Legend of the Brofist	Platform game	iOS, Android, Microsoft Windows, macOS	Outerminds Inc.	Himself (voice)	
2016	PewDiePie's Tuber Simulator	Simulation game	iOS, Android	Outerminds Inc.	Himself (voice)	
2018	Animal Super Squad	Physics puzzle game	Microsoft Windows, iOS, macOS, PlayStation 4, Nintendo Switch, Xbox One	Doublemoose Games	Voice role	
2019	PewDiePie's Pixelings	Strategy game	Android, iOS	Outerminds Inc.	Himself (voice)	
2019	Poopdie	Dungeon crawler	Android, iOS, Nintendo Switch	Bulbware	Voice role	

== Discography ==
List of singles, with selected chart positions
Title	Year	Peak chart positions				Ref.
Title	Year	SWE Heat.	NZ Hot	SCO	US Com.	Ref.
"BROFIST" (with Roomie)	2016	—	—	—	—	
"Hej Monika" (with Party in Backyard)	2018	—	—	—	—	
"Bitch Lasagna" (with Party in Backyard)	2018	—	—	—	—	
"Rewind Time" (with Party in Backyard)	2018	—	—	—	—	
"Congratulations" (with Roomie and Boyinaband)	2019	8	27	77	1	
"Mine All Day" (with Party in Backyard)	2019	—	—	—	3	
"YouTube Rewind 2019, but it's actually good" (with Party in Backyard)	2019	—	—	—	—	
"Coco"	2021	—	—	—	—	

== Bibliography ==
- This Book Loves You (15 October 2015)

== Awards and nominations ==
Year	Ceremony	Category	Result	Ref.
2013	Starcount Social Star Awards	Most Popular Social Show	Won	
2013	Starcount Social Star Awards	Sweden Social Star Award	Won	
2013	5th Shorty Awards	#Gaming	Won	
2014	2014 Teen Choice Awards	Web Star: Gaming	Won	
2014	4th Streamy Awards	Best Gaming Channel, Show, or Series	Nominated	
2014	2014 Golden Joystick Awards	Gaming Personality	Won	
2014	The Game Awards 2014	Trending Gamer	Nominated	
2015	2015 Teen Choice Awards	Choice Web Star: Male	Nominated	
2015	5th Streamy Awards	Best First-Person Channel, Show, or Series	Nominated	
2015	5th Streamy Awards	Best Gaming Channel, Show, or Series	Won	
2015	2015 Golden Joystick Awards	Gaming Personality	Won	
2015	The Game Awards 2015	Trending Gamer	Nominated	
2016	8th Shorty Awards	YouTuber of the Year	Nominated	
2017	43rd People's Choice Awards	Favorite YouTube Star	Nominated	
2019	2019 Teen Choice Awards	Choice Gamer	Won	

== See also ==
- Internet in Sweden
- List of YouTubers

== Further reading and viewing ==
- Parment, Anders (2014). Marketing to the 90s Generation: Global Data on Society, Consumption, and Identity. Palgrave Macmillan. ISBN 9781137444295.
- Talking about some stuff Ive never talked about. PewDiePie. 25 March 2017. Archived from the original on 29 October 2021 – via YouTube.

Records
Preceded by Smosh	Most-subscribed YouTube channel 2013–2013	Succeeded by YouTube Spotlight
Preceded by YouTube Spotlight	Most-subscribed YouTube channel 2013–2013	Succeeded by YouTube Spotlight
Preceded by YouTube Spotlight	Most-subscribed YouTube channel 2013–2019	Succeeded by T-Series
Preceded by T-Series	Most-subscribed YouTube channel 2019–2019	Succeeded by T-Series
