= Jacksepticeye =

Irish YouTuber (born 1990)

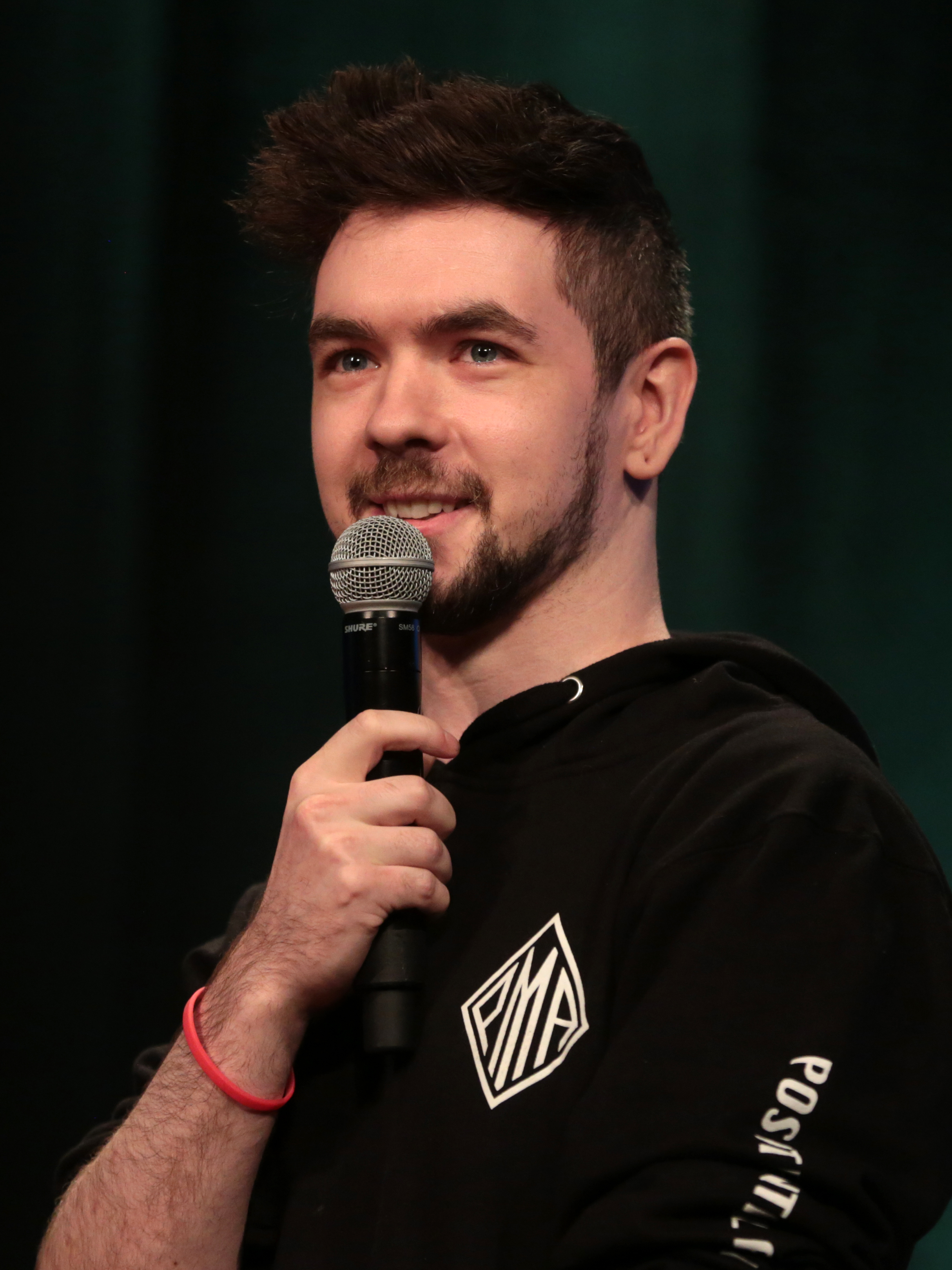
- McLoughlin in 2018
- Born: Seán William McLoughlin; 7 February 1990 (age 36); Ballinasloe, County Galway, (Note: McLoughlin's birthplace has been reported variously as Cloghan or Ballycumber, both in County Offaly, Ireland. His mother, responding to claims that he was from Athlone, said that Ballycumber is his hometown. McLoughlin himself said in an interview with Wired that he was born in Cloghan and in a later interview with the magazine that he was born in Ballinasloe, County Galway.) Ireland
- Education: Athlone Institute of Technology (BA (Hons))
- Occupations: YouTuber; actor; producer
- Partners: Signe "Wiishu" Hansen (2015–2018); Evelien "Gab" Smolders (2019–present)

YouTube information
- Channels: jacksepticeye; Spedicey
- Years active: 2012–present
- Genres: Let's Play; comedy; vlogs
- Subscribers: 31.1 million (main); 1.08 million (second)
- Views: 17.813 billion (main); 203.4 million (second)
- Last updated: 17 November 2026

Seán William "Jack" McLoughlin (/ʃɔːn məˈɡlɒklɪn/ SHAWN mə-GLOK-lin; born 7 February 1990), better known by his online pseudonym Jacksepticeye (stylised in all lowercase), is an Irish YouTuber, streamer and philanthropist. His videos focus on gaming, comedy, and vlogging.

Raised in Cloghan, County Offaly in Ireland, McLoughlin played video games from a young age. He started uploading videos to YouTube in December 2012 and his channel grew rapidly in the following years, reaching a million subscribers in 2014 and 10 million by 2016. Throughout 2017, McLoughlin appeared on Disney XD and Irish national television before touring in Europe and the US in 2017 and 2018 for his How Did We Get Here tour and the Game Grumps's Ready Player 3 tour.

In 2018, McLoughlin began streaming exclusive content on Twitch as part of a multi-year deal with Disney Digital Network. He continued to create YouTube videos and appear in live events, including Summer Game Fest in 2020. In 2021, McLoughlin appeared in the film Free Guy starring Ryan Reynolds. The following year, he released a biographical documentary entitled How Did We Get Here? which featured footage from his tour of the same name. In 2025, he starred in the video game Dispatch in a voice role. In April 2026, it was announced that he would co-produce the upcoming Bloodborne film adaptation.

McLoughlin is the founder and owner of the Top of The Mornin' Coffee company. He also co-founded the clothing brand Cloak with fellow YouTuber Markiplier, although he is no longer associated with the brand. He is an active philanthropist, participating in fundraisers that have raised tens of millions for charitable organizations.

== Early life and education ==
Seán William McLoughlin was born on 7 February 1990, the youngest of five children to John (c. 1936 – 27 January 2021) and Florrie McLoughlin. He was born in Ballinasloe, and raised in Cloghan in County Offaly, Ireland and also lived for a time in Banagher. His father worked for the Electricity Supply Board and his mother worked a number of jobs before she became a care-giver for his grandmother. McLoughlin began playing video games at the age of seven and as a child he spent time playing on the Nintendo Game Boy in a neighbourhood treehouse, later describing how he found a sense of belonging in games. As a child, he was often called Jack, a common nickname for Seán in Ireland. He was given the nickname "Jack Septic Eye" after a childhood accident during a football match in which he injured his eye.

When he was 18, McLoughlin and his family moved to a cabin in Ballycumber. McLoughlin studied music technology and production at Limerick Institute of Technology. In the third year of the degree, McLoughlin decided to drop out and return home to Ballycumber. He then moved to an apartment in Athlone, County Westmeath, in 2014 where he studied hotel management at the Athlone Institute of Technology, earning a Bachelor of Arts (Honours) degree. He lived in Athlone until 2017 when he moved to Brighton, England. Among the reasons for the move were the city's strong LGBTQ and vegan communities, and privacy concerns after fans found his home in Athlone.

== Internet career ==
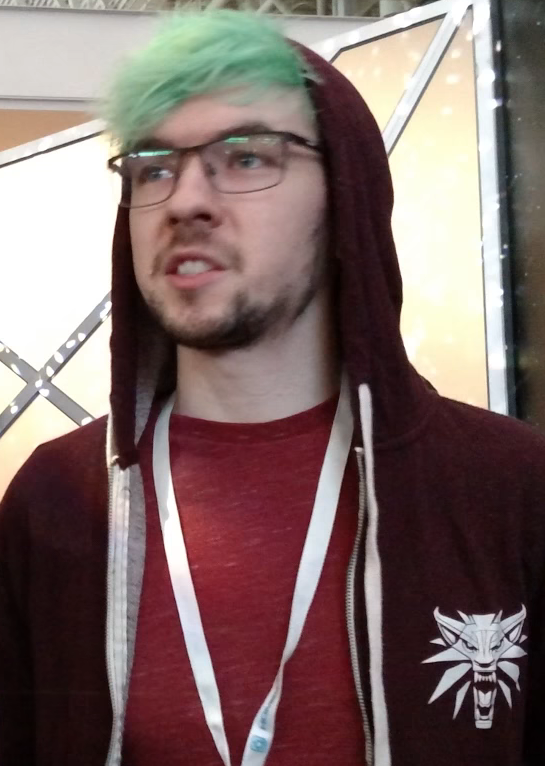
McLoughlin at PAX East in 2016

McLoughlin started uploading videos to YouTube under the name "jacksepticeye" in December 2012, initially focusing on voice impressions before transitioning to gameplay content. In 2013, he was mentioned in a PewDiePie video, causing his channel to go from 2,500 subscribers to 15,000 in four days. Due to the success of his channel, McLoughlin was able to make it his full-time job by May 2014. In August of the same year he hit a million subscribers, and by the end of the year he had reached 1.5 million.

By February 2015, the channel had reached one billion views and 3.2 million subscribers. The following year, he gained another six million subscribers. In January 2016, he was one of the initial YouTubers signed under PewDiePie's multi-channel network Revelmode. That year, he co-hosted South by Southwest's annual SXSW Gaming Awards, and appeared in the 2016 YouTube Rewind.

McLoughlin co-starred as the antagonist in the second season of the YouTube Red show Scare PewDiePie. Initially planned to premiere on 9 March 2017, the season was cancelled prior to release due to controversy surrounding PewDiePie and the use of anti-semitic imagery on his channel. Following the controversy, it was confirmed that the Revelmode network had been shut down by Disney. Subsequently, McLoughlin was signed under the Disney Digital Network.

In June 2017, Polaris, a division of The Walt Disney Company, announced that McLoughlin would be featured in the series Polaris: Player Select on the television channel Disney XD as part of a new programming block for the channel called D | XP. Later that year, McLoughlin was featured on the RTÉ 2 two-part documentary Ireland's Rich List as one of the "top 30 earners under the age of 30", leading to him receiving a wide coverage in the Irish media and a greater exposure to people in the country who had not seen his YouTube content.

McLoughlin toured throughout September–October 2017, in the US with his How Did We Get Here tour, and later in the UK and Europe with the Game Grumps on their Ready Player 3 tour. The How Did We Get Here show consisted of a biographical retelling of McLoughlin's childhood in Ireland to his rise as a popular YouTuber, alongside segments in which McLoughlin would play games with his fans. In February 2018, McLoughlin released dates for a US and Canada run of the How Did We Get Here tour. That July, he performed the show at the Just for Laughs comedy festival in Montreal. In 2018, it was announced McLoughlin would produce exclusive content for livestreaming platform Twitch as part of a multi-year deal with Disney's Digital Network.

In January 2019, McLoughlin signed with the talent agency WME and later that year signed with the multi-channel network Studio71. McLoughlin was set to appear at the Metarama Gaming + Music Festival in October 2019 alongside acts such as Marshmello, Logic, and Ninja, but the event was cancelled due to a lack of funding. In 2020, McLoughlin participated in Summer Game Fest, an event that ran from May to August following the cancellation of E3 2020. In July 2021, McLoughlin released a short film entitled "15 MONTHS" to his YouTube channel which Polygon described as "a moody and atmospheric exploration of his time during the pandemic". Later that year he signed with the talent agency CAA.

McLoughlin appeared as a cameo in the movie Free Guy starring Ryan Reynolds, which was released in August 2021, and provided the director Shawn Levy advice on how to make the film authentic to video game culture. Previously, Reynolds had appeared in a video of McLoughlin's in which they played the video game Deadpool together. In February 2022, McLoughlin announced that a biographical documentary entitled How Did We Get Here? would premiere on 28 February on Moment House, a platform that allows creators to offer ticketed online events. The documentary covers McLoughlin's life from his childhood to his career as a YouTube personality and includes footage from his tour of the same name.

In a July 2022 episode of the Trash Taste podcast, McLoughlin said that he would likely not continue streaming on Twitch because he wanted to focus more on his edited YouTube content. In 2023, McLoughlin and Chris Redd together co-hosted The Gamer and the Mouth, a show featuring gaming creators and comedians in a mixed gaming and comedy event. In 2025, McLoughlin played the supporting character "Punch Up" in a voice role for the video game Dispatch, starring Aaron Paul, and in 2026 he appeared in Markiplier's self-funded horror film Iron Lung. In addition to acting and voice-acting roles, McLoughlin worked on production and behind-the-scenes roles for a number of projects, including for a cancelled animated show based on the horror game Soma, an independent horror movie called Godmother, and a movie adaptation of the video game Bloodborne.

=== Media lists and income ===
McLoughlin's influence and income has been included in a number of media lists and rankings. In September 2017, he was included in Forbes's list of the Top Gaming Influencers of 2017. In 2018, he was estimated to be the eighth highest-paid YouTuber by Forbes, with estimated earnings of $16 million. In 2019, he was estimated to be the eighth highest-paid gamer by Forbes, with estimated earnings of $11 million, and he was announced as the third most talked about gaming personality of the year on Twitter. McLoughlin was featured on the 2020 Forbes 30 Under 30 list under the category "Sports & Games" where he was described as "Ireland's most popular YouTuber".

According to research done by consumer electronics retailer Currys, McLoughlin was the 6th most popular gaming streamer of 2021. McLoughlin was included in Forbes's Top Creators 2022 list at number 15. He was the seventh-highest earning gaming YouTuber in 2022 according to an analysis by casino review site Casino Alpha, with an estimated income of €7.3 million from his YouTube videos that year. McLoughlin was again listed at number 15 in Forbes's Top Creators 2023, being the eighth highest paid creator on the list with an estimated income of $27 million. He was included in Forbes's Top Creators at number 23 with an estimated income of $18 million in both 2024 and 2025.

In June 2014, McLoughlin's channel entered the top 100 most-subscribed channels on YouTube and was the most-subscribed Irish channel according to Tubefilter. Since then his channel has been noted as the most subscribed in Ireland by multiple publications, including the Irish Examiner, The Irish Times, The Times, and The Guardian.

== YouTube content ==
McLoughlin's YouTube content consists mainly of Let's Plays, as well as comedy gaming videos and vlogs. According to TheJournal.ie, the games that McLoughlin plays on his channel are "a mixture of both conventional and weird titles". His content also commonly features collaborations with other popular YouTubers, particularly Markiplier and PewDiePie who are both close friends with McLoughlin. As well as YouTubers, McLoughlin's channel has also featured traditional celebrities, including interviews with Tom Holland, Dwayne Johnson, Kevin Hart, Brad Pitt, Chris Hemsworth, and Margot Robbie. Other content that regularly appears on his channel includes comedy sketches, short films, charity livestreams, and Q&A sessions.

Septic Eye Sam, the logo of the jacksepticeye channel; its prominent use of the colour green represents McLoughlin's Irish identity

His videos typically begin with an intro in which he gives a high five to the camera and says "Top of the morning to ya, laddies", although he had decided to use the catchphrase more sparingly by 2023. He chose to use a stereotypical catchphrase for his intro to express his Irish identity to viewers of his videos, wearing a flat cap for the same reason. He has speculated that his Irish identity and accent has contributed to his success, saying that "[w]hen some young lad comes around and he starts screaming in an Irish accent and swearing, it's like people getting their own Irish drug". His videos also typically end with a catchphrase encouraging his audience to "punch the 'like' button in the face, like a boss!" Another theme that is present throughout McLoughlin's content is the colour green which represents his Irish heritage and is present in his YouTube logo "Septic Eye Sam".

McLoughlin's videos are highly edited. They feature commentary in response to the games he plays which is improvised rather than being pre-planned, incorporating humour, funny voices, laughter, and swearing. His commentary has been described as "genuine" and "authentic" by TheJournal.ie, and as composed of "talking-head, stream-of-consciousness comedy" by the Star Tribune. He calls himself the "most energetic video-game commentator on YouTube", and has described his content as an "assault on the senses" that people "either love or hate".

In a 2017 interview with the Irish Independent, he described the format of his videos as him playing and talking over video games with a lot of swearing. He has cited his use of swearing as a key aspect to his success saying, "There's lots of swearing. The more you swear the better. People react very positively to that apparently." He has also said that his success is due to "an overall package of a lot of things; energy, positivity, honesty, and consistency." McLoughlin has claimed that an inclusive community is an important part of the jacksepticeye channel, stating, "One of the main things I wanted to do on YouTube is to keep people together." McLoughlin has encouraged positivity online with the slogan "positive mental attitude", utilising the phrase in videos, campaigns and merchandising.

Elements of gothic storytelling have been identified in McLoughlin's Let's Plays of horror games and in the character of Antisepticeye, which is played by McLoughlin as an evil presence on the channel. The character originated in response to a similar character called Darkiplier from Markiplier's fanbase. Its presentation utilises fan participation via direct addresses to the audience and interaction between the character and audience members on social media websites such as Twitter. McLoughlin's audience also engages with his content in the form of creating fan fiction. In addition to his YouTube content, McLoughlin also produces short-form videos for TikTok, which tend to focus on more personal content compared to his YouTube channel.

=== Frequency of uploads ===
For the first five years of his career, McLoughlin uploaded two videos per day, later reducing the amount to one per day. In July 2018, McLoughlin announced in a video uploaded to his YouTube channel that he would be taking his first short break from uploading to his channel, citing struggles with his mental health and burnout. The video was among a wave of videos released at the time by various online content creators that focused on creator burnout and was praised by fellow YouTuber Shane Dawson who said that he had felt similar feelings.

In the following years, he continued to be vocal about overwork and burnout and took multiple more breaks from uploading to his channel. In July 2020, he took a break from uploading until August, saying that he was exhausted from his uploading schedule and that he would no longer upload daily videos when he returned to making content. His first video upon his return to YouTube was viewed over 2 million times in its first day and became the top trending clip on YouTube.

In January 2021, McLoughlin took a break from recording and streaming due to personal grief following the death of his father. In July 2021, McLoughlin took another break from releasing videos to his channel which lasted over a month, saying in an interview with Polygon, "I feel like I've done it so often for so long that I just burnt myself out on it. I feel like if I'm not putting the energy that I'm known for; the energy that I like to put into my content, then I'd rather just take a step back from it and do something else."

== Other ventures ==
=== Business ===
In October 2018, McLoughlin posted a video announcing Cloak, a clothing brand aimed at gamers which he created with Markiplier. In June 2020, Cloak welcomed the Twitch streamer Pokimane as a third partner and creative director for the brand. The brand has created special edition collections in collaboration with various franchises and internet personalities including Pokimane, Minecraft Dungeons, Five Nights at Freddy's, and Rhett & Link. The brand usually donates a percentage of its sales revenue to charities, and has raised money for the World Health Organization's COVID-19 Solidarity Response Fund and The Trevor Project in this way. He left the business in 2023.

On 15 June 2020, McLoughlin announced that he was launching his own coffee company, named Top of The Mornin' Coffee, and that it would start its pre-orders on the same day. He also announced that the company had partnered with the Feya Foundation, a charity aimed at combating world hunger. In April 2023, he launched a podcast with fellow YouTuber Ethan Nestor titled Brain Leak. He also announced a comic book with comic book publisher Bad Egg, saying that he had been inspired to partner with the company after they released Godslap in collaboration with YouTuber MoistCr1TiKaL. The comic series, titled Altrverse, features characters that have appeared in his YouTube content; its first issue was released in December 2023.

=== Philanthropy ===
Business Insider has called McLoughlin "one of YouTube's most prolific philanthropists". In 2019, he was presented with a Humanitarian Stream Team award by Save the Children for his fundraising work with them. In 2021, he was named one of Junior Chamber International Ireland's "Ten Outstanding Young Persons" for raising over $6 million for charity between 2017 and 2021. In 2022, he won Best Philanthropic Streamer at The Streamer Awards.

In December 2016, McLoughlin was a part of the Revelmode charity holiday livestream #Cringemas, with PewDiePie, Markiplier, Emma Blackery, and PJ Liguori. The group raised over $1.3 million under the hashtag #EndAIDS, with matching donations from the Gates Foundation and YouTube. In December 2017, McLoughlin hosted two charity streams with Blackery and Liguori to raise money for Save The Children, raising over $260,000 for the charity.

Throughout 2018, McLoughlin hosted various fundraiser livestreams for charities such as the American Foundation for Suicide Prevention, the Depression and Bipolar Support Alliance, GameChanger and AbleGamers, charities which support ill and disabled gamers, St. Jude Children's Research Hospital, and Crisis Text Line, raising a total of over $1 million for charities that year. McLoughlin's Crisis Text Line fundraising stream was held in December and titled "Thankmas", a title that he would go on to use for subsequent annual December charity streams leading up to Christmas.

In 2019, McLoughlin raised hundreds of thousands of dollars for multiple charities, including the Make-A-Wish Foundation, Charity: Water, Red Nose Day 2019, and Emilia Clarke's charity SameYou, which is devoted to brain injury recovery. His December 2019 Thankmas charity stream raised $300,000 for Child's Play. He raised millions of dollars across 2020, raising money for bushfires in Australia, COVID-19 relief funds, MrBeast's Team Trees fundraising campaign, and Black Lives Matter organisations such as The Bail Project, NAACP Empowerment Programs, Color of Change, and the Advancement Project. In December 2020, for his annual Thankmas stream, McLoughlin raised over $1.4 million in 10 hours for the Red Nose Day campaign. Including subsequent livestreams in collaboration with McLoughlin, the campaign raised over $4.6 million.

In December 2021, McLoughlin teamed up with fundraising platform Tiltify for his annual Thankmas stream in aid of the charity New Story which combats homelessness via methods such as 3D printing houses. As part of the campaign, Tiltify provided tools for influencers on platforms such as YouTube, Twitch, Facebook, and TikTok to contribute to the event by hosting additional Thankmas charity streams. The campaign raised $7.6 million overall.

In November 2022, McLoughlin announced he would once again be working with Tiltify to raise money for World Central Kitchen for his annual Thankmas stream, with a goal of $10 million successfully raised during the event. McLoughlin's 2023 Thankmas stream also raised money for World Central Kitchen and was presented live from the Orpheum Theater in Los Angeles. It raised $6 million, bringing the total money raised as part of McLoughlin's Thankmas charity streams to over $25 million. His 2024 Thankmas stream was broadcast live again from the Orpheum Theater in support of Crisis Text Line.

== Views ==
=== Criticism of YouTube ===
McLoughlin has been critical of the changing algorithms and policies at YouTube. In November 2016, McLoughlin responded to YouTube pulling ads from "unsuitable content", stating, "[t]his is people's careers. To completely switch how you do things and not tell anybody is a shitty thing to do." Later that year, he accused the website of using "shady tactics" and "manipulating viewers" after algorithm changes starting in September had caused channels to decrease in new views and subscribers. In May 2018, he responded to a surprise algorithm test from YouTube which changed the order of videos displayed in its subscription feed by stating, "People use the subscription tab to mainly avoid this sort of algorithmic behavior. Please keep that to the home page and recommendations."

In March 2022, McLoughlin released a video complaining about an increased level of scams and spam comments on his videos. Similar videos were also released by Linus Sebastian and Marques Brownlee, leading to YouTube taking steps to counteract the problem. New policies were introduced which removed channels' ability to hide their subscriber counts and ability to use special characters in their channel names in order to hinder impersonation of bigger accounts. Access to enhanced comment moderation settings was also expanded to more content creators on the platform.

McLoughlin has criticised the YouTube algorithm for putting pressure on creators to be constantly creating content and has discussed the problem of creator mental health with YouTube, suggesting that the company could hide video view counts or remove the dislike button. At the same time, he said that YouTube had made him less lonely and less depressed by providing his life with "purpose". McLoughlin has attributed the success of YouTube over television to its increased sense of community, and has said that "People always seek out community, wherever they can. I think YouTube's strongest point is that sense of coming together and watching something together."

McLoughlin has also spoken positively about Twitch-competitor YouTube Gaming following policy changes at Twitch reducing the revenue share taken by streamers on the site, saying "What a mess. Owned by Amazon and acting like some amateur platform. It's no wonder so many of your partners are jumping ship to YT." In 2023, McLoughlin claimed fellow YouTuber MrBeast had ruined YouTube by making it "more about views, money, and popularity than ... about having fun". MrBeast initially called the comments "insanely disrespectful", but later claimed he and McLoughlin had talked privately and there was no animosity between them.

=== Criticism of the video game industry ===
McLoughlin has stated the belief that video game culture should become more inclusive. He has argued that controversies with companies like Activision Blizzard and the use of slurs or "gamer words" on Twitch indicated a toxic "chad energy" in the video game industry and culture. Linking these problems to broader issues, he said "I hope whatever culture we're shifting towards is in that more accepting, open space. There's still a lot of groundwork to be doing, just like in real life and things like LGBTQ representation. But I think we're going in the right direction."

== Personal life ==
McLoughlin dated Danish social media influencer Signe "Wiishu" Hansen between 2015 and 2018. He has been in a relationship with Dutch YouTuber Evelien "Gab" Smolders since 2019. McLoughlin has played the drums since he was young and became a fan of heavy metal music after being introduced to it by his older brother. He was formerly in a melodic death metal-influenced metalcore band called Raised to the Ground. He has autism and attention deficit hyperactivity disorder (ADHD).

== Discography ==
With Raised to the Ground

- Risen from the Ashes (EP, 2009)

As Jacksepticeye

List of singles
Title	Year	Certifications
"All the Way (I Believe in Steve)" (with The Gregory Brothers)	2016	RIAA: Gold
"Enjoy the Show" (with NateWantsToBattle)	2016	—
"All the Way (Pop Remix)" (with The Gregory Brothers, featuring Mike O.)	2017	—
"What Is My Life" (with The Gregory Brothers)	2018	—
"Dude's a Beast (Can't We Just Kill Each Other in Peace)" (with The Gregory Brothers)	2018	—
"Get Back Up" (with The Gregory Brothers)	2019	—
"Drop It" (with Party In Backyard)	2020	—
"Please Jack" (featuring Hello3itch and lil Radio)	2021	—
"Little Green Alien" (with Public Syndrome)	2022	—
"The Best Thing" (with Feziboy)	2023	—

== Filmography ==
=== Film ===
Year	Title	Director	Writer	Producer	Notes	Ref.
2021	15 Months	Yes	Yes	Yes	Short film	
2022	Anomaly Found – Chase Brody	Yes	Yes	Yes	Short film	
2026	Godmother	No	No	Executive		
TBA	Bloodborne	No	No	Yes		

==== Acting ====
Year	Title	Role	Notes	Ref.
2021	15 Months	Himself	Short film	
2021	Free Guy	Himself	Cameo appearance; credited as Seán William McLoughlin	
2022	How Did We Get Here?	Himself	Biographical documentary	
2022	In Space with Markiplier	Drones	Interactive film	
2022	Anomaly Found – Chase Brody	Chase Brody	Short film	
2026	Iron Lung	Jack	Cameo appearance	

=== Television ===
Air date	Show	Channel	Role	Ref.
2017	Polaris: Player Select	Disney XD	Himself	
2017	Ireland's Rich List	RTÉ2	Guest	
2018	The Late Late Show	RTÉ One	Guest	
2022	The Late Late Show	RTÉ One	Guest	
2022	Sonic Prime	Netflix	Pirate Jack (voice)	

=== Video games ===
Year	Title	Role	Notes	Ref.
2015	PewDiePie: Legend of the Brofist	Himself		
2017	Bendy and the Ink Machine	Shawn Flynn		
2017	The Escapists 2	Playable character		
2017	Pinstripe	Jack		
2018	Monster Prom	Mr. Pheel the Eel / Calculester / Jerry / CPUlysses		
2019	River City Girls	Godai		
2019	Vacation Simulator	MountainShopBot		
2020	Murder House	Janitor Jack		
2022	Poppy Playtime	Marcas Brickley		
2022	Bendy and the Dark Revival	Shawn Flynn		
2022	River City Girls 2	Godai		
2023	Fears to Fathom – Ironbark Lookout	Ranger Dan		
2025	Dispatch	Punch Up / Colm		
2026	007 First Light	Staff	Voice and likeness	
2026	Hitman: World of Assassination	Finn "Finnvictus" Colton	Voice and likeness; Elusive Target DLC	

== Awards and nominations ==
Year	Ceremony	Category	Result	Ref.
2016	Shorty Awards	Tech and Innovation: Gaming	Nominated	
2016	The Game Awards	Trending Gamer	Nominated	
2017	Golden Joystick Awards	Best Streamer/Broadcaster	Nominated	
2019	Nickelodeon Kids' Choice Awards	Favorite Gamer	Nominated	
2019	Nickelodeon Kids' Choice Sports Awards	Favorite Esports Star	Nominated	
2019	Teen Choice Awards	Choice Gamer	Nominated	
2021	JCI Ireland "Ten Outstanding Young Persons"	Cultural achievement	Won	
2021	Streamy Awards	Creator Product (for Cloak)	Nominated	
2021	The Streamer Awards	Best Philanthropic Streamer	Won	
2022	The Streamer Awards	Best Philanthropic Stream Event (Thankmas)	Nominated	
2023	Streamy Awards	Creator for Social Good	Nominated	

== See also ==
- List of YouTubers
