= This Book Loves You =

Book written by PewDiePie

- Cover of the English version
- Author: PewDiePie
- Language: English
- Published: October 20, 2015
- Publisher: Razorbill (Penguin Group)
- ISBN: 1-101-99904-7

This Book Loves You is a book by the Swedish YouTuber PewDiePie, released on 20 October 2015 by Penguin Group under their Razorbill imprint. It is a parody of self-help books, and includes various anti-proverbs, paired with visuals. The book is available both as a paperback edition and an e-book.

== Content ==
The paperback edition contains around 250 illustrated pages with parodied inspirational quotes, and was described as being a coffee table–styled book. The book was made available in numerous languages other than English, including Swedish, French and German.

== Inspiration ==
PewDiePie has stated that the original idea for writing the book was given by a fan on Twitter. PewDiePie had posted a parody of an inspirational quote on social media, to which the fan reacted by restating his words with the use of funny images. In response, PewDiePie told that he wanted to do "something more with the idea", continuing with "that’s where it all began". He further stated that the book was a chance to reach his audience in a new way.

== Reception ==
This Book Loves You became a New York Times Bestseller and remained #1 on the list for two weeks in the Young Adult Paperback category. Common Sense Media rated the book at three stars, writing "The smart-alecky, tongue-in-cheek advice one-liners and their colorful illustrations are sure to appeal to PewDiePie's millions of followers." The book has sold over 112,000 copies as of January 2017.
