= Scare PewDiePie =

Web television series

- Title card
- Genre: Comedy horror; Reality
- Directed by: Travis Draft
- Presented by: Evan Sutton
- Starring: Felix Kjellberg
- Composer: Jim McKeever
- Country of origin: United States
- Original language: English
- No. of seasons: 1
- No. of episodes: 10

Production
- Executive producers: Robert Kirkman; Felix Kjellberg; Kevin Healey; Bonnie Pan; Amy Finnerty; Rachel Skidmore; David Albert
- Producer: David Storrs
- Production location: Los Angeles
- Cinematography: Bruce Ready
- Editors: Pierre Dwyer; Alex Garcia; Peter Bumgarner; Tato Maizza; Jim Ruxin; Ryan Wise
- Running time: 14–23 minutes
- Production companies: Maker Studios; Skybound Entertainment

Original release
- Network: YouTube Red
- Release: February 10 – April 6, 2016

Scare PewDiePie (stylized in all caps) is an American comedy horror reality web series that stars Swedish YouTube personality Felix Kjellberg, known professionally as PewDiePie. The series was produced by Maker Studios (now Disney Digital Network) and Skybound Entertainment, with Robert Kirkman serving as executive producer, and premiered on February 10, 2016, exclusively for YouTube Red (now called YouTube Premium), the paid subscription arm of YouTube. Episodes feature Kjellberg exploring sets designed and based on horror video games that he played and commented over on his YouTube channel.

Ten episodes were produced and filmed in Los Angeles, California during September 2015. A second season, titled Scare PewDiePie: Multiplayer, was set to be released on March 9, 2017, but the show was cancelled before its release due to scandals involving Kjellberg.

== Plot ==
In the series, PewDiePie encounters terrifying situations and sets inspired by his favorite survival horror video games he previously played on his YouTube channel. In some episodes, he is joined by other YouTubers, who follow and help him, including Mark Fischbach (Markiplier), Ian Hecox and Anthony Padilla of Smosh, Arin Hanson of the Game Grumps, and Matthew Patrick (MatPat).

== Production ==
=== Development ===
In September 2015, PewDiePie announced through a vlog that he was working with a camera crew to shoot a show on location in Los Angeles. At the time, PewDiePie did not reveal whether it was to be shot for a television or online audience, confirming that he could not speak too much about the show's details at the time.

In October 2015, YouTube announced YouTube Red, its paid subscription service that would offer subscribers an ad-free experience and the ability to download videos for offline viewing. It was announced that the service would be launching original content exclusive to YouTube Red subscribers in 2016. This original content was announced to include Scare PewDiePie, the aforementioned series hinted at by PewDiePie. Skybound Entertainment and Maker Studios were announced as producers of the show.

After the series was announced, PewDiePie spoke about his experience shooting the series, stating, "Shooting a show like this in a completely new format has been so much fun," and adding, "we just wrapped shooting but I still feel unsure every day if I'm safe or not from another scare." In a press release, Skybound's co-founder, Robert Kirkman, stated, "Working with Felix, YouTube, and Maker Studios on this venture has been creatively exhilarating and just plain fun. I trust audiences will love the show as much as we loved creating it."

=== Renewal and cancellation ===
On June 23, 2016, YouTube announced that Scare PewDiePie would be renewed for a second season, to be titled Scare PewDiePie: Multiplayer, in which PewDiePie would be joined by fellow YouTuber jacksepticeye. However, on February 14, 2017, YouTube announced that Scare PewDiePie was cancelled following a series of antisemitic jokes made by Kjellberg on his YouTube channel.

On February 18, 2017, jacksepticeye released a video called "Let's Talk!" to his YouTube channel, which discussed PewDiePie being cut from Maker Studios as a result of the controversy. In it, he clarified that although he had tweeted in support of PewDiePie, he did not condone his actions and believed that he should have been more apologetic in response to the controversy. He stated, "You can still be friends with someone but not agree with something they do. I don't think the world is that black-and-white." However, the next day he tweeted that he regretted focusing on criticising PewDiePie in the video, saying that he had been "naive". In a Tumblr post, he said his main regret was not commenting on the mainstream media's reporting of the controversy stating that "there were some unethical practices at play with the media, a lot of misquoting and misrepresentation."

On March 14, 2017, PewDiePie released a comedic video that included a fake first episode of Scare PewDiePie: Season 2. Despite initially stoking online speculation that he would release the second season, PewDiePie confirmed in the video that this would be impossible for legal reasons. He did express regret that the season would not be seen by the public, saying, "It's a shame, it's a damn shame."

== Episodes ==
No.	Title	Episode length	Original release date
1	"Level 1 – Let's Play Doctor"	23:16	February 10, 2016
2	"Level 2 – We're Not Alone"	18:34	February 17, 2016
3	"Level 3 – Hello Timmy"	15:32	February 24, 2016
4	"Level 4 – Time to Die Mr. Pie"	17:25	March 2, 2016
5	"Level 5 – Please Enjoy Your Stay"	21:31	March 9, 2016
6	"Level 6 – The Ultimate Hang"	18:45	March 16, 2016
7	"Level 7 – I'm Not Crazy (Outlast IRL Gameplay)"^{(YouTube Red Free Episode)}	20:44	February 10, 2016
8	"Level 8 – Call of Pewdie"	17:33	March 23, 2016
9	"Level 9 – Naughty Pie"	14:54	March 30, 2016
10	"Level 10 – Game Over"	15:34	April 6, 2016

== Reception ==
The show was not well received by critics, despite receiving support from viewers and PewDiePie fans. Erik Kain wrote for Forbes that the seventh episode (the only episode offered for free to non-YouTube Red viewers) was "terrible." Despite calling PewDiePie "a hard worker" and "a charismatic presence onscreen," Kain suggested that the show was not good enough to justify paying for it, writing: "It's just... maybe if you're a PewDiePie fan you might enjoy it, but I'd rather watch that one Brazilian elevator prank over and over again than this. And I can watch that on YouTube without a $10/month subscription."

Writing for Variety, Brian Lowry said that the show "has a decidedly not-ready-for-primetime feel." Despite expressing optimism that YouTube Red would produce better content in the future, his review of the free episode was overwhelmingly negative, at one point reading: "Even with a relentless barrage of spooky sound effects and funky camera angles – and a creative pedigree that includes producers from The Walking Dead – it’s hard to imagine anything but the most committed bros (referring to PewDiePie fans) being anything but bored."

When the show was initially released, some of PewDiePie's fans felt upset that he had "sold out" by starring in a series produced by a corporation rather than himself. However, when the series was cancelled, many fans rallied around PewDiePie and the show itself, feeling that the second season should have been released and that Kjellberg was being treated unfairly.
