= Social Blade =

American social media statistics website

Social Blade LLC

- Homepage of Social Blade on March 13, 2025
- Website type: Social media analytics
- Available in: English
- Founded: February 8, 2008; 18 years ago
- Headquarters: Raleigh, North Carolina United States
- Creator: Jason Urgo
- Website: socialblade.com
- Registration: Optional

Social Blade (sometimes spelled SocialBlade) is an American social media analytics website. Social Blade most notably tracks the YouTube platform, but also has analytical information regarding Twitch, Facebook, Instagram, and TikTok. Social Blade functions as a third-party API, providing its users with aggregated data from these various social media platforms. Jason Urgo is the CEO of Social Blade.

== History ==
Jason Urgo, the CEO of Social Blade, launched the website in February 2008, to track statistics for the website Digg. In 2010, the website switched to track YouTube statistics. In October 2012, Social Blade became an LLC. In 2014, Social Blade launched consulting and channel management services.

On October 24, 2018, Social Blade started a popular live stream to show the subscriber difference between T-Series and PewDiePie in an online competition. In April 2019, the stream regularly had 900 viewers and led to a large increase of Social Blade's subscriber count. To accompany the attention in April 2019, Social Blade pulled an April Fools' joke where they allowed users to change the subscriber counts and ranks to ridiculously high numbers.

On December 14, 2022, Social Blade confirmed a data breach of 5.6 million records which was uploaded to BreachForums two days prior.

On March 13, 2025, Social Blade updated their website to a more modern version, in the process removing statistics of Twitter, Trovo, Mixer, Dailymotion, and DLive; in regards to removing Twitter statistics from their service, Social Blade stated it was no longer allowed to use the cheapest API option of $200 per month, and that they should be using the Enterprise package.

On April 1, 2026, the official Social Blade Bluesky account was verified.

== Data collection and other functions ==
On its Frequently Asked Questions (FAQ) page, Social Blade wrote that "in order to best scale our tracking to meet the needs of millions that use Social Blade, we pull data from YouTube's public API. This means that we're getting the same information you see on public YouTube channel pages, we just work to examine that data across multiple days and aggregate it into a display format that is useful to you." Social Blade is a website that contains subscriber predictions. Social Blade also provides real-time subscriber count updates.

Social Blade has also been noted to work with content creators and YouTube multi-channel networks (MCNs) to help creators get partnered.

== Recognition ==
=== Social media platforms ===
On December 19, 2016, an official YouTube Twitter account, @TeamYouTube wrote "Please know that third party apps, such as SocialBlade, do not accurately reflect subscriber activity." Social Blade's Twitter account responded to that tweet, commenting "We don't make up data. We get it from the YouTube API. We rely on it for accuracy." Social Blade's community manager Danny Fratella suggested that YouTube content creators may notice subscriber and view count purges more due to a higher accessibility to data-tracking tools like Social Blade.

=== Media outlets ===
HuffPost wrote that "Social Blade estimates earnings for each YouTube channel based on the money generated for every thousand ad views. These estimates aren't exact. Instead, they create a minimum and maximum amount that a channel could be earning; in some cases, the range can be huge. Social Blade's support services manager, Jenna Arnold stated that "the range is huge because the CPMs [cost per thousand views] vary SO much. They can be anywhere from $0.25 to $4.00 on average." Urgo has also commented on the $0.25–$4.00 per 1,000 views range, stating "these data points change from time to time and are not an exact science, but generally hold true for most channels.
