= PewDiePie's Tuber Simulator =

2016 freemium simulation mobile game

Tuber Simulator
- App icon
- Developer: Outerminds Inc.
- Publisher: Outerminds Inc.
- Composer: Tadd Nuznov
- Platforms: iOS, Android
- Release: iOS, Android: WW: 29 September 2016
- Modes: Single-player, multiplayer

PewDiePie's Tuber Simulator is a freemium simulation mobile game developed by Outerminds Inc. and featuring PewDiePie, who voices himself. The game's premise focuses on the player creating online videos for views and subscribers, the former of which they can use to purchase goods that can increase performance.

The game was released on 29 September 2016 on iOS and Android. It became the Apple App Store's top download on its release day and on the following day Kjellberg reported that the app had been downloaded over ten million times. The game experienced server issues during its initial launch.

In 2019, Kjellberg frequently advertised the game at the end of some of his videos as the most relevant game, which led to it becoming a popular meme in his fanbase.

== Gameplay ==
The gameplay of Tuber Simulator simulates the life of a YouTuber, with modes similar to PewDiePie himself. The player creates videos which generate "views", a currency used to purchase items from the store as to decorate the player's room. The creation of videos also allows the player to gain YouTube subscribers, essential for the unlocking of select features and achievements. Achievements can be obtained by completing a specific task, with the reward of views and subscribers, as well as other goods. The player may also use "bux" to purchase special items such as clothing, or to increase the size of the player's room. "Brains" can be used to unlock extra features such as additional delivery slots. A series of user-wide competitions are also available for the player to partake in, each with a theme to match entered rooms. Entry into a competition costs five bux. A player can trade unwanted items for a special magical dust. You can collect more dust for more expensive items, but once something is turned into dust, it cannot be turned back. Once enough dust has been obtained the user can swap it for cubes that range from grayscale to colourful to invisible. These can be used to show off pixel dust (the name of it) or to create pixel art with - another way to get pixel dust is to play "Pag".

=== Minigames ===
A minigame called "Puggle" is also accessible, reminiscent of pachinko, which can be used to accelerate delivery processes and gain other goods, such as balls containing pixel dust (Up to 100 pixel dust in a ball), bux and egg tokens. How much time gets deducted from a player's delivery depends the delivery reduction multiplier, which depends on how much views they wager in the beginning, how many pegs and bubbles they hit, and the bowl they land in.

Egg hatching minigame is where players buys an egg from the egg dispenser and publish videos with the theme that the egg likes to hatch it. To find out the egg's theme, players have to publish videos to find out. Afterwards, when the player clicks on the egg there should be a small icon indicating the egg's theme.

In early-to-mid 2019, a new minigame called "Craniac" was added. It is like a "Washing Machine type game" where players operates a crane to grab balls containing exclusive items as well as views, brains, egg tokens, celebration mask reward tokens and prisma pixeling eggs.

In 2020, a new mini game called "Gobble" was added, where players have 15 seconds to eat as much food with their Pixelings as possible to reduce the amount of time left for videos to finish.

== Examples of decoration items ==
- Axolotl doll, mask and pixeling
- Chained skeleton, skull, pile of bones
- Steampunk lady and Plague doctor
- Hockey mask (reference to Jason Voorhees)
- Ent
- A Komusō playing shakuhachi
- Satyr
- Arcade machines
- Brain with eyes inside a glass case
- Numerous species of animals including various kinds of dogs and cats
  - Edgar and Maya, two pugs owned by PewDiePie himself. These are the only items which can't be bought more than one time.
- Views commemorative plaques, which will be gained, never bought.
- Numerous cosplayers including knights, fairies, pirates, ninjas, etcetera
- Numerous statues including Frankenstein's bride
- Dinosaurs and its eggs
- Numerous plant species including Venus flytrap
- Numerous sort of foods and drinks including bubble tea
- Banana duct-taped to wall, obvious reference to Maurizio Catalan's Comedian
- Numerous desks, chairs, tables, carpets, sofa, wallpapers, floors
- Numerous posters, plaques and pictures
- Numerous sportive articles
- Flintstones car
- Inflatable doll

== Reception ==
Reception

Review scores
Publication	Score
Gamezebo	2.5/5
Multiplayer.it	6/10
TouchArcade	4/5

Of the game, Rolling Stone commented that Tuber Simulator "has more in common with Kim Kardashian: Hollywood than Game Dev Story" and that "I wasn't sure if I was playing a game or being integrated into a human milking machine". TouchArcade rated the game at four out of five stars, stating that "with some rather simple yet intricate and absorbing gameplay, coupled with PewDiePie’s signature humor and charm that is bound to go down well with his millions of die-hard fans, the game strikes a perfect balance between not taking itself seriously while being intriguing enough to keep interest long after the first cardboard box has been bought."
