= Happy Wheels =

2010 video game

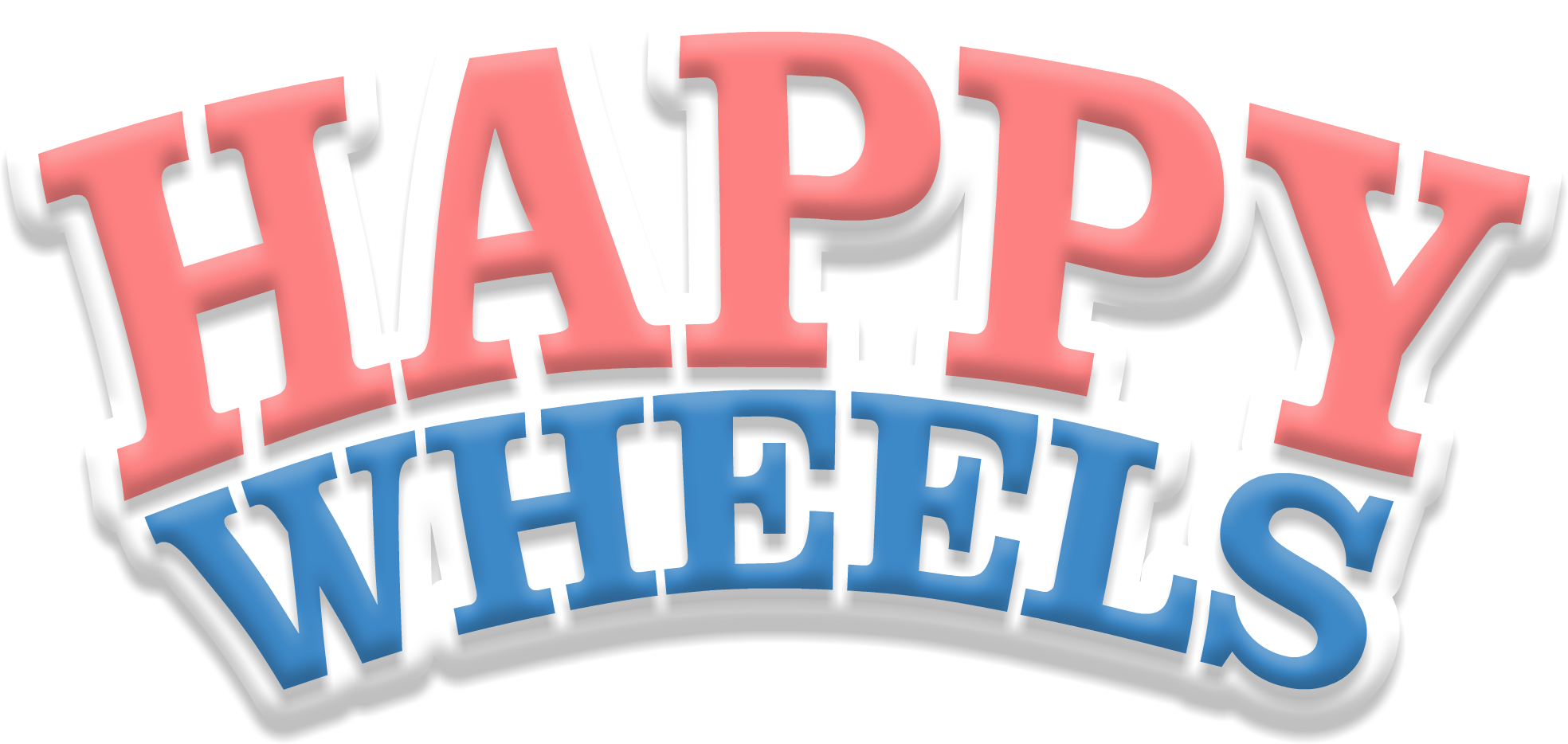
- Developer: Fancy Force
- Publisher: Fancy Force
- Designer: Jim Bonacci
- Programmer: Jim Bonacci
- Artist: Jim Bonacci
- Composer: Jack Zankowski
- Platforms: Web browser; iOS; Android; Windows; Linux
- Release: Browser; June 4, 2010; iOS; August 20, 2015; Android; January 25, 2020; Windows, Linux; September 21, 2026
- Genres: Platform, racing
- Mode: Single-player

Happy Wheels is a side-scrolling ragdoll physics-based platform browser game developed and published by Fancy Force. Created in 2010 by video game designer Jim Bonacci, the game features several player characters using various and often atypical vehicles to traverse the game's many user-generated levels. The game is best known for its graphic violence and the amount of user-generated content its players produce on a regular basis, with game maps shared on a public server.

The game was first released in 2010 as a browser game, later ported to iOS in 2015 and Android in 2020. Standalone Windows and Linux versions were released in 2026. According to Bonacci, a sequel, which he has been working on since at least 2013, is still in development as of December 2020.

== Gameplay ==
Example of the gameplay in Happy Wheels, depicting father and son on a bike, close to finish line

Happy Wheels' tagline is "Choose your inadequately prepared racer, and ignore severe consequences in your desperate search for victory!" The actual mechanics of gameplay vary because of character choice and level design; the game includes characters such as a dad and his son riding a bike, a businessman on a Segway, a homeless man in a rocket-powered wheelchair, and Santa Claus in a flying elf-pulled sleigh.

The goal of the game also differs depending on the level. In most levels, the goal is to reach a finish line or to collect tokens. Many levels feature alternate or nonexistent goals for the player. Reviewers have noted Happy Wheels' graphic violence. For instance, characters can be decapitated, shot, or crushed by various obstacles. Loss of limbs and profuse spurts of blood are also graphic elements. Players also have the choice to upload replays of their level attempts, which can then be viewed by other players.

Happy Wheels features a level editor, which allows players to create custom levels of their own. It contains a plethora of tools and objects for level building. Users can upload their maps to a public server where they are accessible.

== Development ==
Indie game developer Jim Bonacci, the game's main programmer and artist, began work on the game in 2006. Bonacci has said that his inspiration for the game came from other ragdoll physics-based games in the browser games community, as his friend and former boss, Alec Cove, had made a Verlet physics engine for Adobe Flash. Per Bonacci, "I was messing around with it, and eventually created a guy in a wheelchair that would endlessly fall down a random hill. I thought it was funny and stupid, so I kept expanding on it. It was only meant to be a very small game, but eventually it became my main focus." The hyper-violent nature of the game was a reaction to Bonacci's frustration with how the consequences of certain actions were not treated realistically in other game titles. Bonacci stated that "it always bothered me when... you'd fall off your vehicle and harmlessly bounce around. In other cases, you would have the same canned animation over and over. I'm not sure if it was a lack of detail or concern on the part of the developer, but the consequences of your in-game actions were often improperly illustrated. For me, half of the fun of playing a game that imitates life (sort of), is making mistakes and seeing the end result." Bonacci also noted that, because gameplay would often involve the player dying repeatedly, he put a great deal of effort into making that part of the game enjoyable.

Up until the 2026 Steam release, the full version of Happy Wheels was only available on Bonacci's original website, totaljerkface.com. Bonacci's other game, Divine Intervention is also available there. Demo versions of Happy Wheels are licensed to other websites. These demo versions only include a limited number of featured maps and playable characters. There are approximately 10 million user-generated levels. The total count of level plays is over 13 billion. Jason Schymick has helped Bonacci work on the game programming, although different people have contributed. "The others who helped are all amazing", says Bonacci. Alec Cove joined Fancy Force in 2013 and handles all server-side architecture and development.

On September 30, 2014, Schymick announced that iOS and Android ports of the game have been in development. The iOS version was released as a free download through the App Store on August 20, 2015. For the Android version, Fancy Force began accepting beta test applications in October 2019. Following a beta testing phase, the finished version was released on January 25, 2020. On January 9, 2020, Bonacci posted on his website that a JavaScript port by Goodboy Digital was in development and the game would continue to function after Adobe Flash ended at the end of 2020. Eleven months later, on December 28, 2020, the JavaScript port was released, continuing the existence of the game after the end of Flash. A PC release made with Electron was released for Windows and Linux on Steam on September 21, 2026. According to Bonacci, he had been expecting about 5000 sales, but just before the game went live on Steam, it had been wishlisted over 750,000 times.

== Reception ==
Reception

Aggregate score
Aggregator	Score
Metacritic	iOS: 73/100

Review score
Publication	Score
Gamezebo	3.5/5

Happy Wheels has received generally positive reviews. It was recommended by GameSetWatch and considered one of the "Best Free Games" by IGN. Its level editor and amount of user-generated content have received praise from reviewers. The over-the-top nature of the violence is a central theme of the game, and some reviewers have considered it humorous; one review stated that "It is so genuinely difficult to play Happy Wheels and not just laugh and laugh at the ridiculous ways in which your character can be torn into pieces."

== Web series ==
In November 2016, a nine-episode animated web series based on Happy Wheels titled Happy Wheels: The Series premiered on Verizon’s go90. Produced by Machinima, Inc. and Bunim/Murray Productions digital division BMP Digital, Happy Wheels: The Series is set in the title town, dubbed as "the most dangerous community on Earth" where "people are mangled everyday by traps, spikes, mines, cars, unsafe roads and hazards." Five concerned citizens form a safety awareness committee called D.E.A.T.H.S. to prevent any more casualties, but end up either killing more people directly or falling victim to the traps themelves. The series has been officially inaccessible since the shutdown of go90 on July 31, 2018.
