= Marzia Kjellberg =

Italian businesswoman (born 1992)

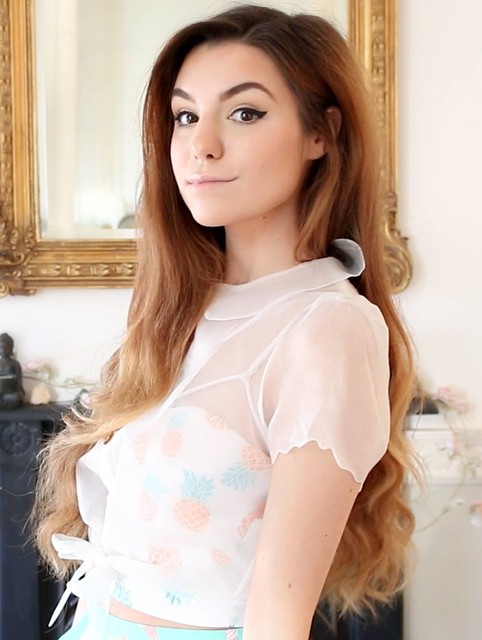
- Kjellberg in 2014
- Born: Marzia Bisognin; 21 October 1992 (age 33); Arzignano, Veneto, Italy
- Other names: CutiePie; CutiePieMarzia
- Occupation: YouTuber
- Years active: 2012–2018
- Spouse: Felix Kjellberg (m. 2019)
- Children: 1

YouTube information
- Channel: Marzia
- Genres: Vlog; fashion; beauty; travel; DIY; popular culture; shopping; gaming
- Subscribers: 7.08 million (Note: After retiring from her YouTube career in 2018, she began removing her videos from public viewing, causing her videos' views to decrease to zero; the count peaked in August 2017, at around 570 million. Additionally, her channel's subscriber count peaked in October 2019, around 7.72 million subscribers.)
- Views: 0
- Last updated: 8 August 2026

Marzia Kjellberg (née Bisognin; (Note: Italian: [ˈmartsja bizoɲˈɲin], Venetian: [bizoˈɲiŋ].) born 21 October 1992), formerly known as CutiePieMarzia, is an Italian former YouTuber known for her beauty videos. She parlayed her popularity on YouTube into writing, fashion design, and business ventures. She announced her retirement from YouTube in 2018 and deleted her content.

In 2019, Kjellberg married Swedish YouTuber Felix Kjellberg, better known by his online pseudonym PewDiePie.

== Career ==
=== YouTube ===
Marzia Kjellberg (then Bisognin) created her CutiePieMarzia YouTube channel on 16 January 2012. Her videos on the platform focused on fashion, beauty, makeup, DIY, books, movies, vlogs, haul, and video gaming. Kjellberg also commonly uploaded travel vlogs. Although Italian, Kjellberg spoke English in her videos. Kjellberg was signed to Maker Studios' sub-network, The Platform. By 2018, however, her e-commerce ventures would be managed by Re6l, a Toronto-based company involved with influencer media and e-commerce.

Kjellberg's YouTube channel was one of the most popular in the beauty and makeup genre; in May 2014, The Wall Street Journal reported that it attracted over 16 million viewers each month. The demographics of Kjellberg's viewers have been reported to be females aged 13-24, who use Kjellberg's videos as a reference. Kjellberg refers to her fans as "Marzipans".

Kjellberg appeared on her then boyfriend Felix Kjellberg's channel on various occasions. Felix, better known on YouTube as "PewDiePie," uploaded videos of the two playing video games and participating in video challenges together. In 2014, Kjellberg and Felix were part of an online marketing campaign for the horror film, As Above, So Below. While Felix's videos for the campaign involved gaming-related topics, Kjellberg's videos centered around a travel vlog angle of the couple's trip to Paris. Similarly, ABC had Kjellberg, among others, promote their new TV series, Selfie, via a YouTube marketing campaign.

On 22 October 2018, Kjellberg uploaded a video to her channel announcing her retirement from her YouTube career. In the video she mentioned that at a point during her YouTube career, focusing on the website kept her in a bubble that negatively affected her mental health, although she resolved to reach out to others. She ended her video explaining that she was ready for "something new in [her] life." After she uploaded her final vlog, as she decided to remove her videos; she left a comment on the vlog stating, "Having videos up, after making this decision, would have seemed like taking a step back. I've selected a few that I really liked, which I'm going to leave for a bit - for the 'adjustment' period - but taking my videos down, in my mind, needed to be done". Shortly before her announcement, her YouTube channel had accumulated over 128 million video views and just under 7.5 million subscribers. Her channel's video views previously peaked in August 2017, at around 570 million.

=== Fashion and design ===
Kjellberg's channel's success allowed her to start designing her own clothing. Her first launch of a fashion and design line came in March 2015; since then, Kjellberg launched several lines of merchandise including nail polish shade, home decor products, and most notably clothing. In 2016, she designed "Daisy" shoes through Project Shoe. That July, she launched a product line with Zoya, a nail polish brand. In June 2017, Kjellberg launched Lemon, a clothing line paired with a fragrance. On 1 July 2018, Kjellberg launched Maì–a jewellery, pottery, clothing, and home decor brand. The Maì ceramic accents were handcrafted by Kjellberg out of her UK-based pottery studio. Both Maì and Tsuki Market, a unisex clothing and homeware brand that she owned with Felix, are closed as of 2023.

In a piece about fashion lines created by YouTube personalities, Tubefilter cited comments from Michael Fink, the dean of the School of Fashion at Savannah College of Art and Design, as well as celebrity stylist Allison Calhoun. Kjellberg's "Amore" clothing line was positively received by Fink, who stated "the gold zipper and heart applique of this skirt are right on trend, yet the A-line silhouette is timeless. You can't go wrong with this piece." Calhoun opined that "I'm personally not crazy about the patterns, colors, or cuts but I definitely can see the customer who might be. I also want to applaud Marzia and her designs for not being as topical as the others. It seems like she's making clothes that she wants to wear without a ton of inspiration from the outside world."

=== Writing ===
In January 2015, Kjellberg published a young adult fantasy/horror novel. The Italian version was published under the title La Casa Dei Sogni, while the English version was published as Dream House: A Novel by CutiePieMarzia.

=== Voice acting ===
Aside from creating content on her own channel, Kjellberg has been a voice actress in various animated web series. She voiced Carrie the Carrot in Oscar's Hotel for Fantastical Creatures. Kjellberg also voiced the character Maya, based on her own dog, in a six-episode animated web series titled Pugatory.

== Personal life ==
Marzia Bisognin was born on 21 October 1992 in Arzignano, located in the Province of Vicenza, Italy.

She was introduced by a friend to her husband, Felix Kjellberg, better known online as PewDiePie. She began dating Felix in 2011, after e-mailing him and stating that she found his videos funny. Marzia moved to Sweden to live with him in October of that same year. Later, the couple moved to her native Italy, before settling together in Brighton, England. The couple lived there with their two pugs, Edgar and Maya, as well as a hedgehog named Dogy. Their relationship has been highlighted by various media outlets, with The Globe and Mail writing that her "calm personality balances out Felix's general wackiness". On 27 April 2018, Kjellberg announced on Instagram that Felix had proposed to her; on 20 August 2019, the couple announced on social media that they had married.

While living in Brighton, their house in Japan was burglarized in late 2019; Kjellberg posted a statement online which included: "I know it is very materialistic, and should be happy with what I was left/have, but I can't hide the shock and sadness with all being taken away, just like that." In May 2022, Kjellberg and Felix fully moved to Japan. On 5 February 2023, the couple announced that they were expecting their first child, and they announced the birth of their son on 11 July 2023.
