= YouTube Rewind 2018: Everyone Controls Rewind =

YouTube Rewind video released by YouTube

- YouTube Rewind episode
- Thumbnail of YouTube Rewind 2018, featuring many YouTubers in the video
- Original release date: December 6, 2018
- Running time: 8:12

Episode chronology
← Previous "YouTube Rewind: The Shape of 2017"	Next → "YouTube Rewind 2019: For the Record"

YouTube Rewind 2018: Everyone Controls Rewind (also known as YouTube Rewind 2018) was a video that was uploaded to the official channel of the video-sharing website YouTube on December 6, 2018, as the ninth installment of the YouTube Rewind series. The video features references to video games and internet culture, starring YouTubers such as Ninja and Marques Brownlee, as well as celebrities like Will Smith and Trevor Noah.

YouTube Rewind 2018 was panned by critics, YouTubers, and viewers alike, who dubbed it the worst YouTube Rewind video to date. The video was criticized for the inclusion of unpopular or outdated trends and the exclusion of many prominent YouTubers of the year, as well as rivalries such as KSI vs Logan Paul and PewDiePie vs T-Series. By December 13, 2018, a week after its upload, Everyone Controls Rewind had over 10 million dislikes, making it the most-disliked video on YouTube of all time, a record that was previously held by the music video for Justin Bieber's "Baby" for over seven years. The video further achieved 20 million dislikes before dislike counts were removed from YouTube's API on December 13, 2021.

This video, in addition to all other YouTube rewinds, were initially made unlisted on December 9, 2025, but later set to private in January 2026.

== Overview ==
YouTube Rewind was an annual series of videos released from YouTube's channel from 2010 to 2019 that was produced (alongside Portal A Interactive), released and distributed by the namesake website via its official channel. Each video was a recap of the year's trends and events.

The video themes around everyone being able to control YouTube Rewind, with various featured personalities describing what events they want to review. The video begins with actor Will Smith on Jebel Jais's mountain range, suggesting the inclusion of the video game Fortnite and YouTuber Marques Brownlee in the video. The camera then cuts to Brownlee, other YouTubers, and Twitch streamer Ninja as the bus driver, conversing inside a battle bus, a reference to the game.

The following scene depicts a group of YouTube personalities surrounding a campfire. The group suggests that the Rewind should have K-pop, references to the wedding of Prince Harry and Meghan Markle, the internet meme 'Bongo Cat,' a science experiment involving melting lipstick, and the inclusion of electronic musician Marshmello, whose mask is removed and revealed to be Mason Ramsey underneath. The video then cuts to a group doing a mukbang in South Korea. After the scene, animator TheOdd1sOut suggests adding the "In My Feelings" challenge to the video. The video rapidly cuts between scenes of various YouTubers and celebrities dancing to the challenge, including scenes of talk show hosts Trevor Noah and John Oliver performing dances from Fortnite. Animator Jaiden Animations includes several easter eggs, comprising references to other memes and events of the year, such as Ugandan Knuckles, an invitation to Super Smash Bros. Ultimate, KSI vs. Logan Paul boxing match, a group of items on the wall that spell out "Sub 2 PewDiePie", as well as PewDiePie's swivel chair.

After the challenge, Lilly Singh says the video should feature "the people who managed to do something bigger than themselves." Several YouTubers give shoutouts to various groups of people, including people who strived for mental health awareness and "all women in 2018 for finding their voices." Later, Elle Mills decides to read a faux comments section on what to feature in the Rewind. Various comments are featured, featuring pop culture references to the costumes in Kanye West and Lil Pump's "I Love It" music video, the 2018 FIFA World Cup, the children's song Baby Shark, and the Dame Tu Cosita dance craze. The 'Sister Squad' (James Charles, Dolan Twins, and Emma Chamberlain) are then shown in outer space, driving a car resembling Elon Musk's Tesla Roadster. The video ends with Smith laughing as he watches the aforementioned battle bus through a pair of binoculars and states "That's hot, that's hot." While the credits are playing, Primitive Technology is featured, sculpting the YouTube Rewind logo with clay.

== Cast ==
This is the list of starring cast members in YouTube Rewind 2018: Everyone Controls Rewind, derived from its website (in alphabetical order).

- 10Ocupados
- Adam Rippon
- Afros e Afins por Nátaly Neri
- Alisha Marie
- Ami Rodriguez
- Anwar Jibawi
- AsapSCIENCE
- AuthenticGames
- BB Ki Vines
- Bearhug
- Bie The Ska
- Bilingirl Chika
- Bongo Cat (@StrayRogue and @DitzyFlama)
- Bokyem TV
- CajuTV
- Casey Neistat
- Caspar
- Cherrygumms
- Collins Key
- Dagi Bee
- Desimpedidos
- Diva Depressão
- Dolan Twins
- Domics
- Dotty TV
- Elle Mills
- Emma Chamberlain
- Enes Batur
- EnjoyPhoenix
- EroldStory
- FAP TV
- FavijTV
- Fischer's
- Furious Jumper
- Gabbie Hanna
- GamingWithKev
- Gen Halilintar
- Gongdaesang
- gymvirtual
- Hannah Stocking
- HikakinTV
- How Ridiculous
- illymation
- ItsFunneh
- Jaiden Animations
- James Charles
- John Oliver
- Jordindian
- Jubilee Media
- JukiLop
- julioprofe
- Katya Zamolodchikova
- Kaykai Salaider
- Kelly MissesVlog
- Krystal Yam & family
- LA LATA
- Lachlan
- LaurDIY
- Lele Pons
- Life Noggin
- Lilly Singh
- Liza Koshy
- Los Polinesios
- Lucas the Spider
- Luisito Comunica (Rey Palomo)
- Luzu
- Lyna
- Manual do Mundo
- Markiplier
- Marques Brownlee
- Marshmello
- Mason Ramsey
- Me Poupe!
- Merrell Twins
- Michael Dapaah
- MissRemiAshten
- mmoshaya
- Molly Burke
- Ms Yeah
- Muro Pequeno
- NickEh30
- NikkieTutorials
- Ninja
- Noor Stars
- Pautips
- Pinkfong Baby Shark
- Pozzi
- Primitive Technology
- RobleisIUTU
- Rosanna Pansino
- Rudy Mancuso
- Safiya Nygaard
- Sam Tsui
- SamHarveyUK
- SHALOM BLAC
- Simone Giertz
- skinnyindonesian24
- Sofia Castro
- sWooZie
- Tabbes
- Technical Guruji
- The Try Guys
- TheKateClapp
- TheOdd1sOut
- Tiền Zombie v4
- Trevor Noah
- Trixie Mattel
- Wengie
- whinderssonnunes
- Will Smith
- Yammy
- Yes Theory

== Reception ==
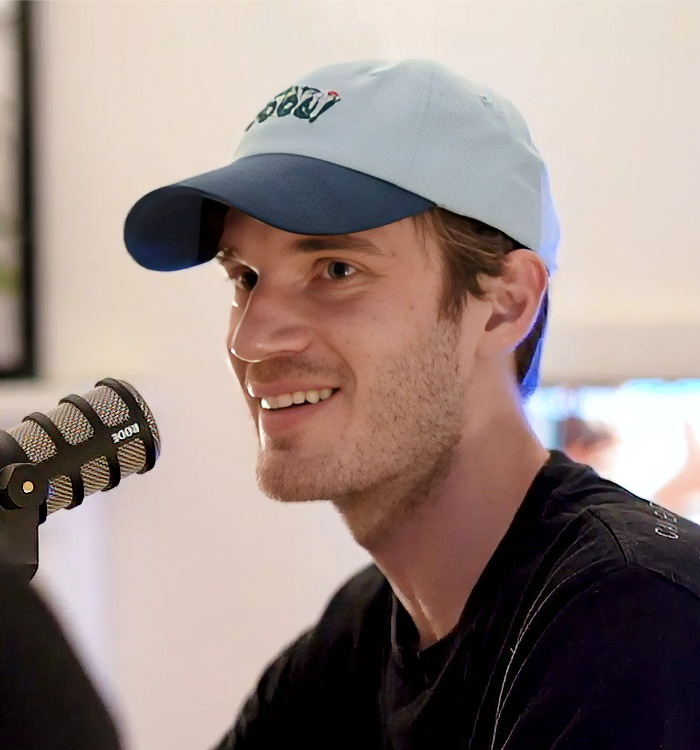
YouTube Rewind 2018: Everyone Controls Rewind was criticized for not including PewDiePie, despite being the platform's most-subscribed channel at the time and his rivalry with T-Series generating significant attention.

Upon its release, YouTube Rewind 2018: Everyone Controls Rewind was universally panned by critics, YouTubers, and viewers alike. Many YouTubers deemed it the "worst Rewind ever". Only a few portions of the video received praise, with many viewers applauding Jaiden Animations for incorporating PewDiePie's chair, as well as other Easter eggs, into her segment of the video. Other criticisms included what viewers had seen as the video's overuse of some trends, many of them being seen as outdated or unpopular among the YouTube community, including Fortnite, as well as the lack of variety in references. It was also prominently criticized for its social commentary, which some felt was shoehorned into the video. Many people were also angered with PewDiePie not being included, as his channel was the most-subscribed on the platform at the time.

While YouTube Rewind 2018: Everyone Controls Rewind incorporated user comment suggestions as a part of the video, Nicole Engelman of The Hollywood Reporter called YouTube "out of touch". Julia Alexander of The Verge suggested that YouTube had intentionally left out the biggest moments on the platform in 2018 from the video in an attempt to appease concerned advertisers over controversies that had plagued the platform over the past two years, stating that "it's increasingly apparent, however, that YouTube is trying to sell a culture that's different from the one millions of people come to the platform for, and that's getting harder for both creators and fans to swallow." Meira Gebel of Business Insider shared a similar sentiment, saying "The video appears to be an attempt for the company to keep advertisers on its side following a rather rocky 2018."

PewDiePie, who was not in YouTube Rewind 2018: Everyone Controls Rewind, criticized the video. He stated that he was almost glad he wasn't in it because "it's such a cringey video at this point which I think is quite a shame honestly." He adds on the statement saying that "Rewind [used to be] something that seemed like an homage to the creators that year, it was something cool to be a part of." He further criticized the over-saturation of Fortnite, the inclusion of celebrities not associated with YouTube, and the lack of any mention of the outpouring of support on the platform for those who died before December, including Icelandic actor and YouTuber Stefán Karl Stefánsson. On top of his criticism, he, along with FlyingKitty, Party In Backyard, Grandayy and Dolan Dark, created their take of YouTube Rewind 2018: Everyone Controls Rewind on December 27, 2018, titled "YouTube Rewind 2018, but it's actually good", which focused on the notable memes of 2018.

Marques Brownlee, who was prominently featured in the video, said Rewind had once been a "big celebration of YouTubers and the biggest events that had happened on the site in a particular year. It became an honor to be included in Rewind. But now YouTube saw Rewind as a way to showcase all the best stuff that happens on YouTube for advertisers." He concluded that "Instead of honoring creators, it is now a list of advertiser-friendly content. Rewind has turned into a giant ad for YouTube."

In a video uploaded in February 2019, then-YouTube CEO Susan Wojcicki said "Even at home, my kids told me it was cringey." She promised a better Rewind for 2019 and revealed several priorities for YouTube for the year.

=== Dislikes ===
YouTube Rewind 2018: YouTube Rewind 2018: Everyone Controls Rewind surpassed "Baby" to become the most-disliked YouTube video within a week of being uploaded.

On December 13, 2018, a week after being uploaded, it became the most-disliked video on the website, beating the previous record-holder: the music video for Justin Bieber's "Baby." In a statement given to media outlets, YouTube spokeswoman Andrea Faville said that "dethroning 'Baby' in dislikes wasn't exactly our goal this year."

After the release of the video and subsequent backlash, YouTube began to discuss possible options to prevent abuse of the dislike button by "dislike mobs", such as making the like–dislike ratings invisible by default, prompting disliking users to explain their dislike, and removing the dislike count or the dislike button entirely. Tom Leung, the director of project management at YouTube, described the possibility of removing the dislike button to be the most extreme and undemocratic option, as "not all dislikes are from dislike mobs."

In November 2021, dislike counts became viewable only by a video's uploader in an attempt to "help better protect our creators from harassment, and reduce dislike attacks — where people work to drive up the number of dislikes on a creator's videos." Dislike counts were further removed from YouTube's API on December 13, 2021, by which point the video had amassed more than 20 million dislikes.
