= YouTube Rewind =

Discontinued annual event on YouTube (2010–2019)

- Genre: Year-in-review, video mashup, music mashup
- Created by: YouTube
- Directed by: Kai Hasson (2011, 2013–2019); Peter Furia (2012)
- Composers: Jeff Kite (2012); DJ Earworm (2013–2014); The Hood Internet (2015–2019); Avicii (original remix) (2015); Major Lazer (original remix) (2016)
- Country of origin: United States
- Original language: English
- No. of seasons: 1
- No. of episodes: 10

Production
- Executive producers: Lee Hunter, Michael Rucker, Kevin Allocca, Dom Elliott (2012); Nate Houghteling, Zach Blume (2013–2019); Kai Hasson (2014–2019)
- Producers: Michael Rucker, Peter Furia and Beau Lewis (2012); Jeffrey Sabin-Matsumoto and Finley Wise (2013–2017)
- Running time: 1–8 minutes
- Production companies: Portal A Interactive (2011, 2013–2019); Seedwell (2012); YouTube

Original release
- Network: YouTube
- Release: December 12, 2010 – December 5, 2019

YouTube Rewind (stylized as YouTube ЯEWIND) was an annual year-in-review web series that was produced by YouTube and Portal A Interactive from 2010 to 2019. The videos were summaries of each year's viral videos, events, trends, and music. The series' annual installments were uploaded onto YouTube's official channel.

The series' 2018 and 2019 installments (Everyone Controls Rewind and For the Record) were received poorly, with the former becoming the most-disliked video of all time on the platform. YouTube opted not to produce a Rewind video in 2020, before announcing the series' cancellation the following year. All videos were unlisted in December 2025 and later made private in January 2026.

== History ==
The first Rewind video was created by YouTube in 2010 and featured a list of the 50 most popular YouTube videos of that year. In 2010, YouTube began creating and producing Rewind videos with the help of Seedwell and Portal A Interactive. From 2011 onwards, the Rewind videos have only been uploaded to the YouTube Spotlight channel, now known as just YouTube, with additional behind-the-scenes content.

=== 2010 ===
On December 12–13, 2010, the first YouTube Rewind was uploaded, titled 2010 YouTube Rewind: Year in Review and featured the top ten most popular videos of the year on YouTube. It was uploaded on two channels: YouTube Trends on the first day, and YouTube Spotlight on the second.

=== 2011 ===
On December 20, 2011, YouTube Rewind 2011 was uploaded. It was created and produced by YouTube and Portal A Interactive, and features Rebecca Black, whose music video of her song "Friday" had gone viral in March of that year, as the host. Like in 2010, it featured another top-ten most-popular videos of the year on YouTube.

=== 2012 ===
In 2012, YouTube's Rewind videos changed to featuring several popular YouTubers; the most popular music videos, and videos; breaking news; and internet memes from the year. Rewind YouTube Style 2012, referencing Psy's "Gangnam Style", was released on December 17, 2012. It was created and produced by YouTube and Seedwell.

The video starts with the text "Nothing is more powerful than a video whose time has come"; the final two words change to "is 2012.", with an accompanying string instrument sound that resembled the musical introduction to Kony 2012, a viral documentary film aired earlier that year.

=== 2013 ===
The YouTube Rewind button with the ⏪ symbol was introduced in 2013.

On December 11, 2013, YouTube Rewind: What Does 2013 Say?, referencing Ylvis' "The Fox (What Does the Fox Say?)", was released. The video also made prominent use of Psy's "Gentleman", however, following a copyright claim from the artist, the video was amended in 2015 to remove the song. The video was created and produced by YouTube and Portal A Interactive. This was the first year that the YouTube Rewind Button was used; otherwise, the video was stylistically similar to the 2012 video. DJ Earworm served as the music producer for the video, mashing up six popular songs of the year. Jimmy Fallon and The Roots from The Tonight Show made guest appearances. It also marked the first appearance of PewDiePie in the Rewind series.

What Does 2013 Say? was dedicated to fellow YouTuber Talia Castellano, who died on July 16, five months prior to the release of the video.

=== 2014 ===
On December 9, 2014, YouTube Rewind: Turn Down for 2014, referencing DJ Snake and Lil Jon's "Turn Down for What", was released. It was again created and produced by YouTube and Portal A Interactive. Over 10 songs were mashed-up by DJ Earworm for the video. The video was not structured around songs, as in previous years, but with more Internet memes and trends used alongside the music. Its main feature was the YouTube Rewind Button flag, with which YouTubers and other notable personalities run throughout the video. The flag was run through the sets of The Colbert Report by Big Bird; Conan by host Conan O'Brien himself, with Freddie Wong acting as substitute host; and Last Week Tonight with John Oliver by Kid President. The actual Rewind Button was not shown until the end of the video. It also marked the first appearance of Vsauce in the Rewind series.

=== 2015 ===
On December 9, 2015, YouTube Rewind: Now Watch Me 2015, referencing Silentó's "Watch Me (Whip/Nae Nae)", was released. It was again created and produced by YouTube and Portal A Interactive, and was the first one to feature a hashtag, in this case #YouTubeRewind. The video heavily incorporated references to previous years of YouTube, due to 2015 being the year of the website's tenth anniversary. The music mashup was produced by The Hood Internet and included songs such as Major Lazer and DJ Snake's "Lean On", the Weeknd's "Can't Feel My Face", and Justin Bieber's "What Do You Mean?". Additionally, Avicii produced an original remix of "Broken Arrows" for the video. The video featured more gaming personalities than in previous years, including Markiplier, CaptainSparklez, MatPat, and Smosh Games, with a segment set up to resemble Five Nights at Freddy's. PewDiePie and Zoella make an appearance halfway through the video, where they are shown next to a scoreboard with two dates of December 9, 2015, a reference to Back to the Future Part II, which is set in 2015. Zoella changes one scoreboard date back to February 14, 2005, leaving the other at December 9, 2015. Afterwards, PewDiePie "brofists" the Rewind button, triggering the video to show past viral videos and memes from 2015 back to 2005. After the credits, the Fine Brothers are shown arguing about whether PewDiePie is actually in the video.

=== 2016 ===
On December 7, 2016, YouTube Rewind: The Ultimate 2016 Challenge, referencing the increasing number of Internet challenges in 2016, was released. It was again created and produced by YouTube and Portal A Interactive. The Hood Internet returned to produce the music mashup for the video, with Major Lazer contributing an original remix of their own. The video begins with Dwayne Johnson showing a miniature Rewind button, and YouTube personalities hunting for Rewind symbols in the style of Pokémon Go. The video also references objects being crushed by a hydraulic press, Hodor from Game of Thrones, the water-bottle flip challenge, "PPAP (Pen-Pineapple-Apple-Pen)" (with Pikotaro himself appearing), and the dabbing dance move. The video also references some of the most popular songs of 2016, including Fifth Harmony's "Work from Home", the Chainsmokers' "Closer", and Beyoncé's "Hold Up". The video ends with James Corden and other personalities in a car, re-enacting the Carpool Karaoke segments from The Late Late Show.

=== 2017 ===
On December 6, 2017, YouTube Rewind: The Shape of 2017, referencing Ed Sheeran's "Shape of You", was released. The video received mixed reviews from critics, YouTubers, and viewers alike following its release. Some of the various criticisms were directed at its overuse of memes, and the notable exclusion of PewDiePie for controversies earlier in the year. To date, it has received over 4.6 million likes. It also received significantly more dislikes than those from the previous years (excluding 2011), at over 2.3 million dislikes in 2020, making it the 35th most-disliked YouTube video of all time.

=== 2018 ===
On December 6, 2018, YouTube Rewind 2018: Everyone Controls Rewind was released. Upon its release, the video was overwhelmingly panned, receiving extensive backlash from critics, YouTubers, and viewers alike. Many YouTubers deemed it the "worst Rewind ever". (Note: Attributed to multiple sources:) Criticisms ranged from the inclusion of celebrities and personalities who are not affiliated with YouTube (such as Will Smith and Ninja), lack of tributes to recent deaths, such as those of Stephen Hawking, Avicii, TotalBiscuit, Stefán Karl Stefánsson, XXXTentacion, Aretha Franklin, Mac Miller, Stan Lee, Anthony Bourdain, and Stephen Hillenburg, as well as the exclusion of certain controversial personalities, such as Shane Dawson and Lil Pump, alongside the rivalries of KSI vs Logan Paul and PewDiePie vs T-Series.

Everyone Controls Rewind incorporated user-comment suggestions as a part of the video, although many viewers stated that the trends that the video included (such as Fortnite and K-pop) were unpopular with the majority of the community, calling YouTube "out of touch" with its viewers and their interests. Julia Alexander, writing for The Verge, suggested that YouTube had intentionally left out the biggest moments on the platform in 2018 in an attempt to appease worried advertisers over controversies that had plagued the platform over the past two years: "it's [...] increasingly apparent, however, that YouTube is trying to sell a culture that's different from the one millions of people come to the platform for, and that's getting harder for both creators and fans to swallow". Meira Gebel of Business Insider shared a similar sentiment, saying that "The video appears to be an attempt for the company to keep advertisers on its side following a rather rocky 2018." In a newsletter, YouTube CEO Susan Wojcicki spoke on the poor reception of the 2018 video and mentioned that "even my kids called it 'cringey'."

Everyone Controls Rewind was panned by the YouTube community, surpassing the music video for "Baby" by Justin Bieber to become the most-disliked YouTube video of all time. It subsequently became the first YouTube video to receive over ten million dislikes and accumulated over 20 million dislikes by late 2021, when YouTube disabled dislikes from being publicly viewable. Meanwhile, PewDiePie's own version of Rewind titled "YouTube Rewind 2018 but it's actually good", claimed the top spot of the most liked non-music videos only two days after being uploaded.

=== 2019 ===
On December 5, 2019, YouTube Rewind 2019: For the Record was released. The 2019 edition returned to a format reminiscent of the first two iterations of the series, featuring a montage of the top videos of 2019, divided into several themed countdowns based on statistics and trends. Kevin Allocca, YouTube's head of culture and trends, explained that the video was intended to be more reflective of the year's trends, acknowledging that it was becoming more difficult for the previous format to "authentically represent" the community's overall experience. The video has been criticized as coming off as "passive-aggressive" towards consumers, or "lazy", as it does not have the same level of production as the previous editions and was noted for being akin to WatchMojo videos. Many also felt the new format lacked energy and a "soul", saying that it showed that YouTube was being openly more corporate. However, many saw improvement with casting choices in some areas, particularly with the inclusion of PewDiePie, who was absent in previous Rewinds. Similarly to the previous year, the video was criticized for lacking tributes to personalities who had died in the year, most notably Desmond "Etika" Amofah and Cameron Boyce.

Meanwhile PewDiePie's second own version of Rewind titled "YouTube Rewind 2019 but it's actually good", serves the similar edition from Rewind 2018.

Although it was marked as an improvement over the previous installment, YouTube Rewind 2018: Everyone Controls Rewind, the video received negative reviews, with critics and the general audience finding the video uncreative in comparison to past Rewind videos.

For the Record amassed over 3.1 million dislikes within 24 hours of release and 5 million dislikes within 48 hours of release, more than those acquired by Everyone Controls Rewind in the same timeframes. It currently has over 9.6 million dislikes, making it the sixth most-disliked video on YouTube. YouTube forwent producing a Rewind installment for 2020 and later announced the discontinuation of the series the following year. In December 2025, For the Record along with the other Rewind videos were set to unlisted on YouTube before subsequently being made private in January 2026.

==== Overview ====
The video begins with a 'rewind' of 2019's most viewed/liked videos on YouTube. It then cuts to a scene from YouTube Rewind 2018: Everyone Controls Rewind where Casey Neistat and the Merrell Twins suggest K-pop as one of the themes for the rewind. Following this, it cuts to multiple YouTubers' reactions to this scene where it has been labelled as awkward and YouTube themselves stating that "In 2018, we made something you didn't like. So in 2019, let's see what you DID like. Because you're better at this than we are", with the words on screen. A compilation of trending YouTube videos from 2019 is shown, then cuts to the words on screen, saying "You made these the MOST LIKED CREATOR VIDEOS of 2019, duh...", in the form of a 'top 10' list, with a short snippet of each video playing at their appropriate times.

==== Production ====
The 2019 edition returned to a format more reminiscent of the 2010 and 2011 iterations of the series, featuring a montage of the top videos of 2019, divided into several themed countdowns based on statistics and trends. Kevin Allocca, YouTube's head of culture and trends, explained that the video was intended to be more reflective of the year's trends, acknowledging that it was becoming more difficult for the previous format, which ran from 2012 to 2018, to "authentically represent" the community's overall experience.

==== Reception ====
Despite being seen as an improvement over the previous year's Everyone Controls Rewind, For the Record received negative reviews, with many viewers disappointed that it did not have the same level of production as previous installments in the series, and noting it as being akin to WatchMojo videos. Many also felt the new format lacked "ambition, energy and a soul", and that it showed that YouTube was being openly more corporate and uncaring towards their creators. Others have also noted the omission of PewDiePie's "Congratulations" from the list of most liked music videos of the year, despite YouTube's listing standards which prevent geo-restricted content from being included in For the Record. Another PewDiePie-related criticism was how none of his accomplishments were included in the "YouTubers' Achievements in 2019" segment, yet it included T-Series (the first channel to hit 100 million subscribers, despite PewDiePie becoming the first youtuber to do so) and Enes Batur (a youtuber from Turkey who came under fire for copying PewDiePie, and abusing the copyright system against fellow creator JT after he called Batur out on said copying.) Similarly to last year, some viewers criticized the video for its complete lack of tributes to YouTubers that had died before December, such as Desmond "Etika" Amofah. However, viewers saw improvement with casting choices in some areas, particularly with the inclusion of PewDiePie, who was absent in the last two installments. For the Record won the 2020 Webby Award for Entertainment in the category Web.

Despite being included in the video, PewDiePie, along with FlyingKitty, Party In Backyard, Grandayy and Dolan Dark, created their take of it on December 29, 2019, titled "YouTube Rewind 2019, but it's actually good", which focused on the notable memes of 2019 and also paid homage to various recently deceased creators, including Dillon the Hacker, Etika and Grant Thompson.

As of November 10, 2021, For the Record currently has over 117 million views and over 9.5 million dislikes, making it the sixth most-disliked YouTube video and the third most-disliked non-music YouTube video of all time after Everyone Controls Rewind and the trailer for Sadak 2. It was peaked as the third most-disliked video at the time before being surpassed by the Sadak 2 trailer within three days.

== Cancellation and replacement efforts ==
On November 12, 2020, YouTube announced that they would not produce a Rewind video that year, a decision indirectly stated on their Twitter by saying that "2020 has been different. And it doesn't feel right to carry on as if it weren't. So, we're taking a break from Rewind this year." While the events of the year, including the COVID-19 pandemic and the impact of the world, were strongly suggested as the reasons behind the decision, many believed that this was really due to the poor reception of the latest installments in the previous three years of the series, and many fans doubted that the effects of the pandemic had been the main reason for the cancellation, as the previous two Rewinds had been some of the most disliked videos on the platform leading to speculation that YouTube would cancel the series entirely.

With the absence of a 2020 Rewind video by YouTube, popular YouTube creators such as Michelle Khare and MrBeast released their own Rewind-style videos. On December 12, 2020, creator Michelle Khare released YouTube Rewind 2020: The Musical onto her own channel after releasing a trailer three days prior. Due to fan backlash over the inclusion of a lookalike of Jenna Marbles, who left YouTube in June 2020, the video was set to private.

In a similar fashion to PewDiePie's Rewind 2018 and 2019, on January 1, 2021, MrBeast released his own version of YouTube Rewind for 2020, titled YouTube Rewind 2020: Thank God It's Over, which focused on the notable memes of 2020, and paid homage to personalities who had died in the year, including Kobe Bryant and Chadwick Boseman.

On October 7, 2021, YouTube announced that Rewind would be discontinued, expressing hope that its creators would fill in the gap. Instead, a 24-hour interactive livestream titled Escape2021 was broadcast on December 16 as a replacement, including a live performance by BTS on Minecraft produced by the Noxcrew and also featuring Minecraft YouTubers Dream, GeorgeNotFound, Aphmau, PrestonPlayz, BriannaPlayz, and BeckBroJack. There has not been an official YouTube end-of-year event or escape video since then.

In December 2025, YouTube introduced a seasonal recap feature, which serves as a culmination of a user's top channels, interests and artists, in a similar style to Spotify Wrapped. In mid-December of that year, all video editions from 2010 to 2019 of YouTube Rewind became unlisted on the official YouTube channel, and a month later in January 2026, all the videos were made private.

== Series videos ==
Video	Upload date	Views (millions)	Likes (thousands)	Dislikes (thousands)	Like percentage	Dislike percentage
"YouTube Rewind 2010: Year in Review"	December 13, 2010 (Note: Uploaded to YouTube Trends on December 12 and YouTube Spotlight on December 13, 2010)	7.2	118.33	9.44	92.61%	7.39%
"YouTube Rewind 2011"	December 20, 2011	12.97	142.02	95.82	59.7%	40.29%
"Rewind YouTube Style 2012"	December 17, 2012	195.22	1553.8	92.83	94.36%	5.64%
"YouTube Rewind: What Does 2013 Say?"	December 11, 2013	137.36	1689.39	90.62	94.91%	5.09%
"YouTube Rewind: Turn Down for 2014"	December 9, 2014	135.8	1717.75	88.94	95.08%	4.92%
"YouTube Rewind: Now Watch Me 2015 | #YouTubeRewind"	December 9, 2015	155.92	3025.14	220.73	93.2%	6.8%
"YouTube Rewind: The Ultimate 2016 Challenge | #YouTubeRewind"	December 7, 2016	243.26	4091.22	592.83	87.34%	12.66%
"YouTube Rewind: The Shape of 2017 | #YouTubeRewind"	December 6, 2017	240.42	4690.49	2377.11	66.37%	33.63%
"YouTube Rewind 2018: Everyone Controls Rewind | #YouTubeRewind"	December 6, 2018	227.08	3122.49	20183.18	13.4%	86.6%
"YouTube Rewind 2019: For the Record | #YouTubeRewind"	December 5, 2019	119.81	3502.92	9616.59	26.7%	73.3%
Behind the Scenes
"Behind the Scenes + Outtakes from Rewind YouTube Style 2012"	December 17, 2012	3.62	44.67	1.49	96.77%	3.23%
"Making of YouTube Rewind: What Does 2013 Say?"	December 11, 2013	3.58	49.5	1.94	96.23%	3.77%
"YouTube Rewind 2014: Behind the Scenes"	December 9, 2014	5.47	101.61	1.95	98.11%	1.89%
"#YouTubeRewind"	December 9, 2015	6.32	148.76	2.21	98.54%	1.46%
"#YouTubeRewind"	December 7, 2016	7.43	152.15	5.48	96.52%	3.48%
"#YouTubeRewind"	December 6, 2017	6.36	165.85	21.67	88.44%	11.56%
"#YouTubeRewind"	December 6, 2018	4.63	83.99	211.47	28.43%	71.57%
Others
"YouTube Rewind 2016: Unboxing the Cube in 360° #YouTubeRewind"	December 7, 2016	1.84	28.11	3.54	88.81%	11.19%
"YouTube Rewind 2016: Epic Group Running Man Challenge in 360° #YouTubeRewind"	December 7, 2016	6.65	55.63	11.95	82.32%	17.68%
As of September 19, 2022

== Guests ==
Guests

Personas	2010	2011	2012	2013	2014	2015	2016	2017	2018	2019
1MILLION Dance Studio										Yes
10ocupados									Yes	
A4										Yes
Adam Dalhberg					Yes		Yes			
Action Movie Kid					Yes					
Adam Rippon									Yes	
Afros e Afins por Nátaly Neri									Yes	
AIB							Yes	Yes		
Alex Clark								Yes		
Alex Wassabi						Yes	Yes	Yes		
Alfie Deyes						Yes	Yes			
Alison Gold				Yes						
Aliza Marzia								Yes	Yes	
Amanda Steele					Yes	Yes	Yes			
Ami Rodríguez									Yes	
Anaysa										Yes
Andovi da Lopez									Yes	
Andrea Russett							Yes			
AndreasChoice							Yes	Yes		
Andymation										Yes
Andy Raconte					Yes					
angelfacepeanut	Yes	Yes								
Angie Velasco										Yes
Anna Akana						Yes				
Anna Brisbin						Yes		Yes		
Annoying Orange	Yes	Yes	Yes	Yes						
Anthony Padilla		Yes	Yes	Yes	Yes	Yes		Yes		
Anthony Quintet						Yes				
Antoine Dodson	Yes									
Ariana Grande										Yes
AsapScience								Yes	Yes	
Atta Halilintar										Yes
Awez Darbar										Yes
Ayo & Teo								Yes		
Azzyland										Yes
Badabun										Yes
Barely Productions	Yes		Yes		Yes					
Bart Baker				Yes	Yes	Yes				
BeingIndian							Yes			
Bethany Mota				Yes	Yes	Yes	Yes	Yes	Yes	
Bearhug									Yes	
Bhuvan Bam								Yes	Yes	
Bianca Heinicke						Yes	Yes			
Bie The Ska							Yes	Yes	Yes	
Big Marvel										Yes
Billie Eilish										Yes
Bilingirl Chika									Yes	
Black Gryph0n										Yes
Blackpink										Yes
Blanco Brown										Yes
Bongo Cat									Yes	
Bokyem TV									Yes	
Brandon Laatsch			Yes	Yes						
Bratayley								Yes		
Brave Wilderness								Yes		
Brittanti Taylor					Yes					
Brooklyn and Bailey McKnight						Yes	Yes	Yes		Yes
BTS										Yes
Bunny Meyer								Yes		
Cabot Phillips							Yes			
CaELiKe						Yes	Yes	Yes		
CajuTV									Yes	
CanalCanalha								Yes		
Casey Lawrence			Yes							
Casey Neistat						Yes	Yes	Yes	Yes	Yes
Caspar Lee							Yes	Yes	Yes	
Cassey Ho				Yes			Yes			
ChapkisDanceUSA										Yes
Charlie Sheen		Yes								
Cherrygumms									Yes	
Chester See			Yes	Yes						
Chris Hardwick					Yes					
Clevver TV			Yes							
Cody Lynn	Yes									
Colin Furze					Yes		Yes			
Collins Key									Yes	
Conan O'Brien					Yes					
Conchita Wurst					Yes					
Connor Franta					Yes	Yes	Yes			Yes
Corridor Digital		Yes	Yes	Yes	Yes					
Cyprien					Yes	Yes	Yes			
D-Trix				Yes			Yes			
Daddy Yankee								Yes		Yes
Daimaou Kosaka							Yes			
Dagi Bee									Yes	
Daniel Howell					Yes	Yes	Yes	Yes		
DanTDM								Yes		
DashieXP							Yes	Yes		
Dave Days			Yes	Yes						
David Dobrik								Yes		Yes
Deeva Jessica								Yes		
Deji Olatunji							Yes	Yes		
Derek Gerard										Yes
DeStorm Power		Yes	Yes	Yes				Yes		
Dina Tokio							Yes	Yes		
Dodie Clark					Yes			Yes		
Domics									Yes	
Dotty TV									Yes	
Dross Rotzank								Yes		
Dua Lipa							Yes			
Dude Perfect							Yes			Yes
Dwayne Johnson							Yes			
Ed Bassmaster			Yes							
EeOneGuy						Yes	Yes			
Eh Bee Family								Yes		
Elle and Blair Fowler			Yes							
Elle Mills									Yes	
El Rubius						Yes	Yes			
Emma Blackery							Yes	Yes		
Emma Chamberlain									Yes	Yes
Enchufe.tv						Yes	Yes	Yes		
Enes Batur								Yes	Yes	Yes
EnjoyPhoenix					Yes				Yes	
Enzo Knol								Yes		
Epic Meal Time		Yes	Yes	Yes						
Epic Rap Battles of History		Yes	Yes	Yes	Yes	Yes		Yes		
EroldStory									Yes	
Eva Gutowski						Yes	Yes	Yes		
Evan Edinger					Yes					
ExpCaseros								Yes		
Extra Credits								Yes		
F2Freestylers										Yes
Felicia Day			Yes							
Felipe Neto								Yes		Yes
Fine Brothers Entertainment				Yes	Yes	Yes		Yes		
Fischer's								Yes	Yes	Yes
Flula Borg						Yes	Yes			
fouseyTUBE					Yes	Yes				
Freddie Wong		Yes	Yes	Yes	Yes					
Furious Jumpers									Yes	
Gabbie Hanna							Yes	Yes	Yes	
Gabriel Valenciano					Yes					
Galen Hooks										Yes
GamingWithKev									Yes	Yes
Gaurav Chaudhary								Yes	Yes	
Gen Halilintar									Yes	
Germán Garmendia					Yes	Yes	Yes	Yes		
Gigi Gorgeous						Yes	Yes	Yes		
Girls' Generation				Yes						
Greg Lazzaroto						Yes	Yes			
GloZell			Yes	Yes		Yes	Yes			
Grace Helbig			Yes	Yes	Yes	Yes	Yes	Yes		
Greyson Chance	Yes									
h3h3Productions										Yes
hajimesyacho					Yes	Yes	Yes	Yes	Yes	
Hank Green					Yes					
Hannah Hart			Yes	Yes	Yes	Yes	Yes	Yes		
Hannah Stocking								Yes	Yes	
Harun Robert								Yes		
Hayla Ghazal							Yes			
Hikakin					Yes		Yes	Yes	Yes	
Honey Badger's Randall		Yes								
Hongyu ASMR 홍유										Yes
How Ridiculous									Yes	
How It Should Have Ended					Yes					
HunniBee ASMR										Yes
IAMLXGEND										Yes
ibighit										Yes
IHasCupquake						Yes				
Illymation									Yes	
Iman Crosson			Yes							
Ingrid Nilsen					Yes	Yes	Yes			
Isaiah Mustafa	Yes									
ItsFunneh									Yes	Yes
Jacksfilms							Yes	Yes		
Jaiden Animations								Yes	Yes	
Jacksepticeye							Yes			
Jake Paul								Yes		
Jake Roper					Yes			Yes		
James Charles									Yes	Yes
James Corden						Yes	Yes			
Jamie Oliver				Yes						
Jeffree Star										Yes
Jelly										Yes
Jenn McAllister					Yes	Yes	Yes	Yes	Yes	
Jenna Mourey			Yes	Yes	Yes	Yes				Yes
Jennelle Eliana										Yes
Jimmy Fallon				Yes						
Jimmy Kimmel	Yes			Yes	Yes					
Joe Sugg								Yes		
Joey Graceffa						Yes	Yes	Yes		
John Green					Yes	Yes	Yes			
John Oliver					Yes	Yes			Yes	
Jonatan Clay								Yes		
Jordan Maron			Yes			Yes		Yes		
Jovial da Lopez									Yes	
Jubilee Media									Yes	
Judson Laipply						Yes				
Julio Profe									Yes	
Juan de Dios Pantoja									Yes	
Juanpa Zurita								Yes		
JukiLop									Yes	
Justin Bieber	Yes									
Justine Ezarik			Yes	Yes	Yes	Yes	Yes	Yes		
KNCraZy								Yes		
KNN l Kanninich								Yes		
Kassem Gharaibeh		Yes	Yes	Yes						
Kate Clap									Yes	
Kayli Butler			Yes							
Kelly MissesVlog									Yes	
Ken Block	Yes									
Kevin Lieber					Yes	Yes		Yes		
Kid President				Yes	Yes					
Kimberly Loaiza									Yes	
King Russel					Yes	Yes		Yes		
Kristian Nairn							Yes			
Kristen Stewart	Yes									
KSI							Yes	Yes		
Kurt Hugo Schneider					Yes	Yes	Yes	Yes	Yes	
Kurzgesagt										Yes
Kylie Jenner										Yes
Lachlan								Yes	Yes	Yes
Laina Morris			Yes	Yes						
LaToya Forever								Yes		
Lauren Riihimaki						Yes	Yes	Yes	Yes	
LazarBeam										Yes
LDShadowLady							Yes	Yes		
Le Rire Jaune								Yes		
Lele Pons							Yes	Yes	Yes	
Les Twins								Yes		
Lewis Hilsenteger							Yes			
Life Noggin									Yes	
Lil Dicky										Yes
Lil Nas X										Yes
Lilly Singh					Yes	Yes	Yes	Yes	Yes	
Liza Koshy							Yes	Yes	Yes	
Logan Paul								Yes		
Los Polinesios						Yes	Yes	Yes	Yes	
LOUD										Yes
LOUD Babi										Yes
LOUD Coringa										Yes
Lucas the Spider									Yes	
Luis Fonsi								Yes		
Luisito Comunica								Yes	Yes	
LuzuGames							Yes	Yes	Yes	
Mackenzie Ziegler								Yes		
Macklemore				Yes						
Magnet World										Yes
malena010102						Yes				
Mamrie Hart						Yes	Yes			
Manuel Gutierrez								Yes		
Marcus Butler							Yes	Yes		
McFly & Carlito								Yes		
Maria Aragon		Yes	Yes							
Marialejandra Marrero						Yes		Yes		
Markiplier						Yes	Yes	Yes	Yes	
Marques Brownlee						Yes	Yes	Yes	Yes	
Marshmello								Yes	Yes	
Martinez Twins								Yes		
Mason Ramsey									Yes	
Matthew Patrick						Yes	Yes	Yes		
Matthew Santoro						Yes		Yes		
Matt Steffanina								Yes		
Meg DeAngelis							Yes			
Merrell Twins							Yes	Yes	Yes	Yes
Michael Bolton		Yes								
Michael Dapaah								Yes	Yes	
Michelle Phan					Yes					
Millicent Phillips							Yes			
Miranda Sings						Yes				
MrBeast										Yes
mrfreshasian										Yes
Ms Yeah									Yes	
Mystery Guitar Man		Yes	Yes	Yes	Yes					
Nicky Jam							Yes			
Nick Eh 30									Yes	
Niana Guerrero								Yes		
Nigahiga		Yes	Yes	Yes						
NikkieTutorials								Yes	Yes	Yes
Ninja									Yes	
Nilson Izaias Papinho										Yes
Noah Schnapp										Yes
Noor Stars										Yes
Norman Thavaud						Yes	Yes			
Nutticha Namwong									Yes	Yes
Nyan Cat		Yes								
OK Go	Yes									
Okie_Doki_Boomer	Yes	Yes								
OliWhiteTV							Yes	Yes		
하루한끼 one meal a day										Yes
Ozuna								Yes		
백종원의 요리비책 Paik's Cuisine										Yes
Paul Vasquez	Yes					Yes				
Pautips								Yes	Yes	
Pencilmation										Yes
Pentatonix					Yes					
Peter Chao			Yes							
PewDiePie				Yes	Yes	Yes	Yes			Yes
Philip DeFranco								Yes		
Phil Lester					Yes	Yes	Yes	Yes		
Pikotaro							Yes			
PlayHard										Yes
Poppy								Yes		
Porta dos Fundos				Yes		Yes		Yes		
PrankvsPrank (& BFvsGF)					Yes	Yes	Yes	Yes		
Primitive Technology									Yes	
Psy			Yes							
Rachel Levin						Yes	Yes	Yes		
RackaRacka							Yes			
Ray William Johnson		Yes				Yes				
Rebecca Black		Yes				Yes				
Rebecca Parham								Yes		
Rhett and Link		Yes	Yes	Yes	Yes	Yes	Yes	Yes		
RiceGum										Yes
Ricky Dillon						Yes	Yes			
Robert Pattinson	Yes									
RobleisIUTU									Yes	
ROSALÍA										Yes
Rosanna Pansino					Yes	Yes	Yes	Yes	Yes	
Ross O'Donovan						Yes				
Ryan Kaji								Yes		
SACCONEJOLYs							Yes			
Safiya Nygaard								Yes	Yes	
Sam Wills							Yes			
Sebastian Villalobos							Yes			
Sesame Street				Yes	Yes					
Seth Everman										Yes
Seth Meyers							Yes			
Shane Dawson										Yes
Shawn Mendes										Yes
Shit Girls Say			Yes							
Shoaib Akhtar										Yes
Shruti Arjun Anand								Yes		
Simon's Cat								Yes		
Simone Giertz									Yes	Yes
Sofia Castro									Yes	
Smosh		Yes	Yes	Yes	Yes	Yes		Yes		
Smosh Games			Yes			Yes		Yes		
Softpomz								Yes		
Sonja Reid						Yes	Yes			
Sorted Food				Yes			Yes	Yes		
SoulPancake				Yes						
SQUEEZIE						Yes	Yes			Yes
Sananas							Yes	Yes		
SSSniperWolf								Yes		
Stephen Colbert					Yes		Yes	Yes		
Swoozie						Yes	Yes	Yes	Yes	
Tabbes								Yes	Yes	
Talking Animals		Yes								
Taryn Southern			Yes	Yes						
Tati										Yes
Tatiana Subbotina								Yes		
Taylor Lautner	Yes									
Team Naach										Yes
Technical Guruji									Yes	
Russell Horning/The Backpack Kid								Yes		
The Dolan Twins							Yes	Yes	Yes	
The Gregory Brothers	Yes				Yes	Yes				
The Lonely Island		Yes								
The Sidemen								Yes		Yes
The Slow Mo Guys				Yes	Yes	Yes	Yes	Yes		
The Try Guys						Yes			Yes	Yes
The Viral Fever						Yes	Yes			
TheDonato										Yes
TheOdd1sOut								Yes	Yes	
Tiffany Garcia						Yes	Yes	Yes	Yes	
Timothy DeLaGhetto						Yes	Yes			
Toby Turner				Yes						
TomSka							Yes	Yes		
Tpindell								Yes		
Tré Melvin							Yes	Yes		
Trevor Moran						Yes				
Trevor Noah						Yes			Yes	
Troye Sivan					Yes					
T-Series										Yes
Tyler Oakley				Yes	Yes	Yes				
VanossGaming							Yes	Yes		
VEGETTA777										Yes
VRZO channel							Yes	Yes		
Walk off the Earth			Yes							
Wengie							Yes	Yes	Yes	
What's Inside?							Yes	Yes		
Werevertumorro						Yes	Yes	Yes		
whinderssonnunes										Yes
Willdabeast Adams								Yes		
Will Smith									Yes	
워크맨-Workman										Yes
World Order					Yes					
Yasmin Uddin									Yes	
YellowMellowMG							Yes	Yes		
Yes Theory									Yes	
Yosstop							Yes	Yes		
Yuka Kinoshita							Yes			
Yuya						Yes	Yes	Yes		
zbing z.								Yes		
Zoe Sugg						Yes				
Total	17	22	35	39	61	83	110	142	90	83

== Released videos ==
=== Overview ===
Season	Title	Episodes	Originally released		Online viewers (in millions)
Season	Title	Episodes	First released	Last released	Online viewers (in millions)
1	YouTube Rewind	10	December 12, 2010	December 5, 2019	1463.9
BTS	Behind the Scenes	7	December 17, 2012	December 6, 2018	37.36
Others			December 7, 2016		8.45

==== YouTube Rewind (2010–2019) ====
No. overall	No. in season	Title	Time	Original air date	Online viewers (in millions)
1	1	"YouTube Rewind 2010: Year in Review"	1:26	December 12, 2010 (Trends); December 13, 2010 (Spotlight)	6.96
The first video in the series, "YouTube Rewind 2010: Year in Review", was uploaded by the YouTube Trends channel on December 12, 2010. The official Spotlight channel uploaded the same video the next day, subsequently gaining more views. The video for "Bed Intruder Song", by Antoine Dodson and The Gregory Brothers, was revealed to be the #1 video of 2010.
2	2	"YouTube Rewind 2011"	2:20	December 20, 2011	12.79
In 2011, Rebecca Black was the featured performer of the video, presenting the video, and having her music video for "Friday" be revealed as the #1 YouTube video of 2011. The video also features Avicii's "Levels".
3	3	"Rewind YouTube Style 2012"	4:15	December 17, 2012	194.69
In 2012, YouTube released the third YouTube Rewind video on December 17 via YouTube Spotlight. It was directed by Peter Furia, who also produced it alongside Michael Rucker and Beau Lewis. That year's video is a mashup of PSY's "Gangnam Style" and Carly Rae Jepsen's "Call Me Maybe" (music composed by Jeff Kite), which also served as the basis of the video. Unlike in the previous two years, several popular YouTubers made guest appearances, including PSY himself. References to 2012 events, such as the 2012 U.S. Presidential election, Felix Baumgartner, Kony 2012, and NASA were made.
4	4	"YouTube Rewind: What Does 2013 Say?"	5:47	December 11, 2013	136.83
The 2013 YouTube Rewind was the fourth video release of the series. It was released on December 11, 2013, via YouTube's official channel, YouTube Spotlight. It was directed by Kai Hasson and produced by Nate Houghteling, Zach Blume, Jeffrey Sabin-Matsumoto, and David Iain Johnson. It was produced by the Portal A studio. The title is a reference to Ylvis' song "The Fox (What Does the Fox Say?)", which is also the main motif of the video. Other 2013 trends, events, viral videos, and headlining topics were featured and referenced, such as the music videos of "Blurred Lines" (Robin Thicke, featuring T.I. and Pharrell Williams), "Wrecking Ball" (Miley Cyrus), "We Can't Stop" (Miley Cyrus), "Applause" (Lady Gaga), "Roar" (Katy Perry), "Thrift Shop" (Macklemore, and Ryan Lewis, featuring Wanz) and "Animals" (Martin Garrix). The Breaking Bad series finale, Macklemore and Ryan Lewis's album The Heist, and the "Harlem Shake" meme were also referenced. The music was composed by mashup artist DJ Earworm: "The Fox (What Does the Fox Say?)" by Ylvis; "Blurred Lines" by Robin Thicke, featuring T.I. and Pharrell Williams; "Can't Hold Us" by Macklemore & Ryan Lewis, featuring Ray Dalton; "Get Lucky" by Daft Punk, featuring Pharrell Williams and Nile Rodgers; "Gentleman" by PSY (removed from the video in January 2015); "Harlem Shake" by Baauer; Vice-producer Sparks Hopes helped draft the music and sync it with the video, helping incorporate many of the YouTube personalities and guests.
5	5	"YouTube Rewind: Turn Down for 2014"	6:36	December 9, 2014	135.35
On December 9, 2014, YouTube Spotlight released "Turn Down for 2014" (a reference to DJ Snake and Lil Jon's song "Turn Down for What") as the series' fifth installment. It was directed by Kai Hasson and shot in the Portal A studio. The video includes notable events and chart hits of 2014, featuring references to the Ice Bucket Challenge; The First Kiss viral video; The Devil Baby; Spider Dog; Minecraft; Disney's film Frozen; the music videos for "Turn Down for What" (DJ Snake and Lil Jon), "#Selfie" (The Chainsmokers), "Happy" (Pharrell Williams), "Fancy" (Iggy Azalea, featuring Charli XCX), "All About That Bass" (Meghan Trainor), "Anaconda" (Nicki Minaj) and "Dark Horse" (Katy Perry); and the game of the year, Flappy Bird. The music was mixed by DJ Earworm: "Turn Down for What" by DJ Snake and Lil Jon; "Fancy" by Iggy Azalea, featuring Charli XCX; "Happy" by Pharrell Williams from Despicable Me 2; "Bang Bang" by Jessie J, Ariana Grande & Nicki Minaj; "All About That Bass" by Meghan Trainor; "Shake It Off" by Taylor Swift; "Let It Go" by Idina Menzel from Frozen
6	6	"YouTube Rewind: Now Watch Me 2015"	6:40	December 9, 2015	155.11
On December 9, 2015, YouTube Spotlight released "Now Watch Me 2015". The title refers to Silentó's song "Watch Me (Whip/Nae Nae)". The video featured celebrities from 129 YouTube channels. Events, headlining topics and viral videos of 2015 were referenced, including the legality of same-sex marriage in the U.S., Shia LaBeouf's "JUST DO IT!" clips, Back to the Future, Super Bowl Left Shark, Kung Fury, the Five Nights at Freddy's games (the game of the year), Pizza Rat, Carpool Karaoke, and the blue and black / white and gold dress. The following music videos were referenced: "Cheerleader" (OMI), "Watch Me (Whip/Nae Nae)" (Silentó), "Lean On" (Major Lazer and DJ Snake, featuring MØ), "Hey Mama" (David Guetta, featuring Nicki Minaj, Afrojack, and Bebe Rexha), "Elastic Heart" (Sia), "Hotline Bling" (Drake), and "What Do You Mean (Justin Bieber). Since 2015 was YouTube's tenth year of existence, viral videos from the whole of YouTube's span were included: The Ice Bucket Challenge from 2014, "Volvo Trucks - The Epic Split, featuring Van Damme (Live Test)" from 2013, Felix Baumgartner's supersonic freefall from 128k' – Mission Highlights from 2012, Rebecca Black's viral hit "Friday" from 2011, Paul Vasquez's "Double Rainbow from 2010, "JK Wedding Entrance Dance" from 2009, "I'm on a Boat" (the Lonely Island) from 2009, "Charlie Bit My Finger" from 2007, Diet Coke + Mentos and Judson Laipply's viral video "Evolution of Dance" from 2006. The music was composed by The Hood Internet with Avicii: "Cheerleader" by OMI (Felix Jaehn Remix); "What Do You Mean?" by Justin Bieber; "Watch Me (Whip/Nae Nae)" by Silentó; "Can't Feel My Face" by The Weeknd; "Lean On" by Major Lazer and DJ Snake, featuring MØ; "Broken Arrows" by Avicii
7	7	"YouTube Rewind: The Ultimate 2016 Challenge"	6:53	December 7, 2016	241.93
On December 7, 2016, this video included references to events, headlining topics, viral videos and challenges of 2016. "YouTube Rewind: The Ultimate 2016 Challenge" became the fastest video to reach 100 million views on YouTube, just 3.2 days after its release. References included PPAP, dabbing, Mannequin Challenge, Rio 2016 Olympics, water bottle flipping, Stranger Things, hydraulic press, Orbeeze pranks, Corn Drills, rainbow bagels, Scott Sterling, NYC snowboarding, Running Man Challenge, Damn Daniel, T-Rex costume, E-Games, The Dancing Mannequin Heads, "The Door" (Game of Thrones), Prince and David Bowie Tribute (Alex Wassabi), HighLight Challenge, 100 Layers, "JuJu on That Beat", Carpool Karaoke (following on from 2015), Hamilton, and Views (Drake cover album) Game references included the game of the year 2016, Pokémon Go, as well as Street Fighter V, and The Witness. The following music videos were referenced: "Work from Home" (Fifth Harmony, featuring Ty Dolla Sign), "Famous" (Kanye West), "Light It Up" (Major Lazer, featuring Nyla and Fuse ODG), "Sorry" (Justin Bieber), "This Is What You Came For" (Calvin Harris, featuring Rihanna), "Dangerous Woman" (Ariana Grande), "Side to Side" (Ariana Grande, featuring Nicki Minaj), "Hold Up" (Beyoncé), "Panda" (Desiigner), "Cheap Thrills" (Sia), "Hasta el Amanecer" (Nicky Jam), and "Roses" (The Chainsmokers, featuring ROZES) The music was composed by The Hood Internet with Major Lazer: "Sorry" by Justin Bieber; "Work from Home" by Fifth Harmony, featuring Ty Dolla $ign; "Light It Up" by Major Lazer, featuring Nyla and Fuse ODG (Remix); "Hasta el Amanecer" by Nicky Jam; "My Boo" by Ghost Town DJ's; "PPAP (Pen-Pineapple-Apple-Pen)" by Pikotaro; "Closer" by The Chainsmokers, featuring Halsey
8	8	"YouTube Rewind: The Shape of 2017"	7:15	December 6, 2017	239.25
On December 6, 2017, "YouTube Rewind: The Shape of 2017" was uploaded onto the "YouTube Spotlight" YouTube Channel. The title refers to Ed Sheeran's hit song, "Shape of You". This video included references to events, headlining topics, viral videos, and challenges throughout the year. The video made cultural references to various trends in 2017, including the BBC News footage of a professor's children gatecrashing during a live interview, fidget spinners, the viral video of a train slamming into snow, D.I.Y. slime, Salt Bae, the 2017 solar eclipse, Backpack Kid, the Floor Is Lava challenge, Man's Not Hot, Riverdale, the 1000˚ knife, the song Shooting Stars, the film Wonder Woman, the controversy over the album cover of Ariana Grande's My Everything, the Fire Noodle Challenge, April the Giraffe, Slime fight, Full face, the Rolex Challenge, and the film Get Out. It also touched on various tragedies including Hurricane Harvey, the Manchester Arena bombing, and the Chiapas or Central Mexico earthquake. Game references included the 2017 game Dream Daddy: A Dad Dating Simulator. The video referenced popular music videos including, Taylor Swift's "Look What You Made Me Do", Fifth Harmony's "Sweetheart in the Old West (AKA Theme to Ten Days in the Valley)", Dua Lipa's "New Rules", Kendrick Lamar's "Humble", and DJ Khaled's "I'm the One". Songs mixed by The Hood Internet in YouTube Rewind 2017: Luis Fonsi – "Despacito", featuring Daddy Yankee; Kendrick Lamar – "HUMBLE."; Ed Sheeran – "Shape of You"; Bag Raiders – "Shooting Stars"; Smash Mouth – "All Star"; Zedd and Alessia Cara - "Stay"; DJ Khaled - "I'm the One", featuring Justin Bieber, Quavo, Chance the Rapper and Lil Wayne
9	9	"YouTube Rewind 2018: Everyone Controls Rewind"	8:14	December 6, 2018	222.89
On December 6, 2018, "YouTube Rewind 2018: Everyone Controls Rewind" was uploaded onto the "YouTube Spotlight" YouTube Channel. This video includes references to events, headlining topics, viral videos and challenges throughout the year. The video made cultural references to various trends in 2018, including BlocBoy JB's Shoot Dance, Flossing, Will Smith's Grand Canyon bungee jump, the "In My Feelings" Challenge, PewDiePie chair memes, the royal wedding of Prince Harry and Meghan Markle, ASMR, Japanese Foil Ball Challenge, Mukbang Challenge, melting lipsticks, the match between Portugal and Spain in the 2018 FIFA World Cup, Football Challenge, Elon Musk's Tesla Roadster, figure skating at the 2018 Winter Olympics, and the viral video by a boy in a Walmart store yodelling. The video also highly references the online video game Fortnite. The video references popular music videos, including BTS's "Idol", Marshmello and Bastille's "Happier", Kanye West and Lil Pump's "I Love It", Drake's "In My Feelings", El Chombo's "Dame Tu Cosita", and Pinkfong's "Baby Shark". Songs mixed by The Hood Internet in YouTube Rewind 2018: "I Like It" by Cardi B, Bad Bunny, and J Balvin; "Idol" by BTS; "In My Feelings" by Drake; "High Hopes" by Panic! at the Disco; "Baby Shark" by Pinkfong; "Happier" by Marshmello and Bastille
10	10	"YouTube Rewind 2019: For the Record"	5:36	December 5, 2019	118.05
On December 5, 2019, "YouTube Rewind 2019: For the Record" was uploaded to the "YouTube" YouTube channel. The video is a mash-up of the best videos and creators in certain categories, including "most viewed" and "video games". The video starts off with creators reacting to the failure of YouTube Rewind 2018, followed by the text, "In 2018, we made something you didn't like. For Rewind 2019, let's see what you DID like." Viewers have stated that although the video does show popular creators, it does not actually feature them. Songs in YouTube Rewind 2019: "7 Rings" by Ariana Grande; "Bad Guy" by Billie Eilish; "Don't Start Now" by Dua Lipa; "Tokyo Drifting" by Denzel Curry and Glass Animals

==== Behind the Scenes (2012–2018) ====
Title	Time	Original air date	Online viewers (in millions)
"Behind the Scenes + Outtakes from Rewind YouTube Style 2012"	6:14	December 17, 2012	3.61
"Making of YouTube Rewind: What Does 2013 Say?"	7:35	December 11, 2013	3.58
"YouTube Rewind 2014: Behind the Scenes"	6:40	December 9, 2014	5.46
"YouTube Rewind 2015: Behind the Scenes"	4:43	December 9, 2015	6.31
"YouTube Rewind 2016: Behind the Scenes"	3:33	December 7, 2016	7.41
"YouTube Rewind 2017: Behind the Scenes"	3:58	December 6, 2017	6.35
"YouTube Rewind 2018: Behind the Scenes"	4:39	December 6, 2018	4.61

==== Others (2016) ====
Title	Time	Original air date	Online viewers (in millions)
"YouTube Rewind 2016: Unboxing the Cube in 360°"	0:51	December 7, 2016	1.82
"YouTube Rewind 2016: Epic Group Running Man Challenge in 360°"	0:55	December 7, 2016	6.62

== See also ==
- List of most-disliked YouTube videos
