= FAPTV =

Vietnamese YouTube comedy group

- Born: Thái Vũ September 14, 1990 (age 36); Huỳnh Phương December 11, 1992 (age 33); Ribi Sachi June 3, 1990 (age 36); Vinh Râu January 21, 1994 (age 32) Ho Chi Minh City, Vietnam
- Occupation: Comedy troupe

YouTube information
- Channel: FAPTV
- Years active: 2014–present
- Genres: Comedy; Sitcom
- Subscribers: 14.6 million
- Views: 6.2 billion
- Last updated: 22 November 2026
- Website: https://faptvmedia.com/

FAPTV is a YouTube comedy group in Vietnam founded on February 14, 2014, by members: Director Tran Duc Vien, Rapper Thai Vu (BlackBi), AT117 (equipment sponsor) and photo model Ribi Sachi with a passion for art, wanting to create something different from video content on social networks.

== Original ==
FAPTV is a comedy group and entertainment channel operating on YouTube in Vietnam. The channel was established on February 14, 2014. FAP stands for Funny Action Program, which can also mean Forever Alone People.

By 2017, the group's YouTube channel had approximately 3.9 million subscribers and was featured in YouTube Rewind 2017. In 2018, the group reached over 7.7 million subscribers and continued to appear in YouTube Rewind 2018.

On September 17, 2019, FAPTV reached 10 million subscribers on YouTube, becoming the first YouTube channel in Vietnam to receive the Diamond Play Button from YouTube.

== Member ==
=== Main members ===
- Huỳnh Phương
- Vinh Râu
- Thái Vũ
- Ribi Sachi

=== Other members ===
- Thúy Kiều (team Đậu Phộng TV)
- Uy Trần (team Đậu Phộng TV)
- Yên Dương (team Bánh Bao Bự)
- Bình Hưng (team Bánh Bao Bự)
- Trang Nơ
- Mai Xuân Thứ

=== Former members ===
- Trần Đức Viễn
- Long Bể

== List of works ==
=== Liveshow ===
- Những Kẻ Khờ Mộng Mơ (2019)

=== Movies ===
- Lộc Phát (2016)
- Ngày mai Mai cưới (2017)
- Những cô vợ hành động (2022)
- Dân chơi không sợ con rơi (2022)
- Chuyện Xóm Tui: Con Nhót Mót Chồng (2023)
- Chiến Nam: Ve sầu thoát xác (2026)

=== Online movies ===
- Là anh (2016)
- Chàng trai của em (2016)
- Ký túc xá (2017)
- Em của anh, đừng của ai (2017)
- Yêu ư? để sau (2017)
- Dzãy trọ số 9 (2018)
- Ai nói tui yêu anh (2018)
- Có phải người dưng? (2018)
- Anh là ai? (2019)
- Sạc pin trái tim (2019)
- Tầng lớp sinh viên (2020)
- Gia đình hạnh phúc (2022)
- Lớp chuyên "cá biệt" (2022)
- Mùa hè rực rỡ (2023)
- Sếp ơi! Ổn hông? (2023)
- Nhà trọ điện ảnh (2024)
- Anh bike vượt ngàn chông gai (2024)
- Người trong sân trường (2026)
- Cô gái của anh (2026)

=== Music Video ===
- "Tâm ma"
- "Cuộc chiến sinh tử"
- "Sân si"
- "Để anh một mình"
- "Thức tỉnh đi"

== Award ==
Year	Prize	Category	Results	Original
2015	POPS Awards 2015	The most-watched entertainment channel	Win the prize	
2017	POPS Awards 2017	Entertainment Channel of the Year	Win the prize	
2017	Influence Asia 2017	VIETNAM TOP Youtube Channel 2017	Win the prize	
2021	Vietnam Entertainment Awards 2021	YouTube's most popular videos of 2021	Nomination	
2023	YouTube Creators Carnival 2023	Shorts Creators of the Year 2023	Win the prize	

== Incident ==
On May 28, 2022, the FAPTV YouTube channel was renamed Tesla US by hackers, who then posted a fraudulent video about cryptocurrency. That afternoon, the group regained control of the YouTube channel and removed the fraudulent video.
