= Doodlez =

Canadian animated shorts series

- A snapshot from the pilot.
- Genre: Comedy; Animated series
- Created by: Gretha Rose; Sean Scott
- Written by: Gretha Rose; Sean Scott
- Directed by: D. Campbell MacKinlay
- Country of origin: Canada
- Original languages: Silent; Interjection
- No. of seasons: 2
- No. of episodes: 50

Production
- Executive producer: Gretha Rose
- Running time: 1–2 minutes
- Production company: Cellar Door Productions

Original release
- Network: Teletoon
- Release: September 6, 2002 – January 23, 2004

Doodlez is a Canadian animated shorts television series produced for television by Cellar Door Productions, animated by Trapeze Animation Studios, which started airing on Teletoon in 2002. It was seen on Nicktoons and was one of the final programs shown on BBC Kids.

== Summary ==
Doodlez is about Dood, a small boy who is a doodle. Dood gets himself in and out of various Duck Amuck-esque situations, with the aid of Hand, a disembodied hand that uses his pencil to draw (sometimes) helpful things onto the screen for Dood's use, such as helping Dood cheat in a skating race against his rival by drawing a booster behind Dood. Otherwise, however, Hand draws objects or people that complicate the situation and/or make things worse for Dood. Situations include girl troubles, becoming a werewolf, being stuck in a picture frame, watering a sunflower, traveling inside a giant beast to get his lollipop out of its stomach, and many other situations. There was also one episode done without Hand or his pencil, but on a computer, and Cursor (see "one-time characters" below) stood in for Hand. Dood is usually angry at the end of the cartoon, likely because it has to end so early. There is never any spoken dialogue, but sometimes the characters communicate through gibberish and Dood sometimes has a chipmunk laugh. The end of a cartoon always shows the word "the end" appearing somewhere.

== Characters ==
=== Major characters ===
- Dood: The main character who is usually the first object to be drawn.
- Hand: The disembodied hand that holds the pencil and who draws Dood's environment.

=== Supporting characters ===
==== Doodette ====
A female version of Dood and also the love of his life.

==== Martini Moose ====
He shows up now and then, usually with a martini in hoof. He likes bubble baths and knows karate. He is seen as Dood's sidekick.

==== Cop ====
In various episodes, Cop usually squashes Dood and throws him somewhere. After he is squashed, Dood gets handcuffed.

==== Penguin ====
Usually appears during winter.

==== Monster ====
Usually eats Dood and his things.

=== Minor characters ===
- Dood 2: An evil twin of Dood, appeared in "Genesis", an early episode of Doodlez, when Dood was cut in two by a wire and when hand copied doodles on a computer. He also starred in "Dood.com", when Dood was copied.
- Handette: A female version of Hand who has only appeared in the Valentine's Day episode.
- Referee: From when Dood and Guy race.
- Tourist: A shutterbug who also makes Dood rich for a blast of ink.
- Art vandal: A random vandal of art, enjoys drawing mustaches on every piece with a person in it.
- Bull: A bull who disappeared into a red sheet then came back for Dood to make him some coffee.
- Cursor: Replaced Hand in one episode, where the entire program was done on a computer, rather than the standard pad of paper.
- Hot-Dog Salesman: Sold Dood a hot dog in one short and also sells ice cream.
- Sound-effects guy: Followed Dood around in one episode, making various sounds to suit the mood of whatever Dood was experiencing, and to foreshadow any upcoming events.
- Director: Appeared in an episode where Dood was featured in a movie. He holds a clapperboard and barks as a dog in place of dialogue.
- Beaver: Dood's enemy for one episode.

== Television series ==
In 2007, Teletoon announced a Doodlez television series to be released soon. Because this never came out during years later, the studio probably cancelled the production, or they are still in production. An opening for the show was released on KidMango along with a bit of the classic shorts. However, they do not show the shorts anymore.

== Awards and nominations ==
Year	Association	Category	Nominee	Result	Ref.
2003	Gemini Awards	Best Animated Program or Series	Gretha Rose	Won	
2004	Gemini Awards	Best Animated Program or Series	Gretha Rose	Won	

== See also ==
- Pencilmation
