= Damn Daniel =

2016 viral video

Damn Daniel is a 2016 viral video. Daniel Lara and Joshua Holz, students at Poly High School in Riverside, California, reached Internet fame after Holz's video, an edited collection of Snapchat videos, became popular on Vine, YouTube and Facebook. In March 2016, Time magazine listed Lara and Holz as two of "The 30 Most Influential People on the Internet".

== Origin ==
The original online video clip is a 30-second compilation of Lara striding around school, with Holz complimenting his style of dress by repeatedly exclaiming "Damn, Daniel!", occasionally pointing out his prominent white Vans, which are often used to highlight Daniel's distinct style. Holz frequently exclaims "Back at it again with the white Vans." in reference to the shoes worn by Lara. In the video, Lara wore a navy blue hoodie, skinny chinos, a burgundy backpack, and the slip-on sneakers. This led to Lara and Holz guest appearing on The Ellen DeGeneres Show soon after, where Lara received a lifetime supply of Vans' shoes. Lara donated the shoes to patients at Loma Linda University Children's Hospital in California.

The original video was retweeted more than 300,000 times, liked 400,000 times on Twitter and looped more than two million times on Vine.

== Reception ==
Tech Insider stated in an article that "It's hard to explain why it's so funny." As a result of the video's popularity, companies such as Clorox, Vans, Denny's and Axe used the phrase "Damn Daniel" as a part of their marketing campaigns. Vans' profits peaked shortly after the video as well. In addition, the video's rise in popularity created price inflation for "Damn, Daniel Vans", which have received eBay bids for upwards of $400,000. The video has also been turned into a song by rappers Little, Teej, and LeBlanc. According to Wired, Holz's Twitter account was hacked 14 days after the video was uploaded. Daniel and Josh were later featured in the video for the song "California Kids" by Weezer, which appears on the band's 10th album, the White Album. The meme was also turned into a house song by Australian electronic comedy duo Bombs Away, adding to its popularity. Lara was also featured in YouTube Rewind 2016, seen at 2:10 wearing white Vans in a white van.
