= Tatiana Subbotina =

Russian YouTuber (born 1954)

- Born: Tatiana Mikhailovna Subbotina; 18 June 1954 (age 71); Beya, Khakassia Russia
- Occupation: YouTuber

YouTube information
- Channel: Tatiana Channel
- Years active: 2013–present
- Genre: Entertainment
- Subscribers: 57 thousand
- Views: 5.9 million
- Last updated: 21 October 2025

Tatiana Mikhailovna Subbotina (born 18 June 1954) is a Russian YouTuber, host of her own channel called "Tatiana Channel".

== Career ==
She started her activity on YouTube in 2013 (or 2014) with videos about her life in Thailand, eventually reclassifying the channel into video editing tutorials, in particular, using chroma key. Showing on her examples the use of greenery to replace the background, in 2017 she gained wide popularity both among the Russian-speaking audience and among foreign ones. So, in April of the same year, Tatiana took part in Evening Urgant, and following the results of the outgoing year, YouTube became one of its trends as part of YouTube Rewind, hitting the release of the series.
