= Enes Batur =

Turkish blogger and actor (born 1998)

- Born: 9 April 1998 (age 28); Ankara, Turkey
- Occupations: YouTuber; actor

YouTube information
- Channel: newdaynewgame
- Years active: 2013–present
- Genres: Gaming; comedy; vlog
- Subscribers: 17.7 million
- Views: 9.81 billion
- Last updated: 19 June 2026

Enes Batur Sungurtekin (born 9 April 1998) is a Turkish YouTuber and actor. He became known through the vlog videos he published on YouTube. As of June 2026, with 17.7 million subscribers, he has the second most-subscribed personal YouTube channel in Türkiye, through which he publishes various videos.

== Life and career ==
Enes Batur Sungurtekin was born on 9 April 1998 in Ankara to Arzu and Fatih Sungurtekin. His mother and father are from Malatya and Adana respectively. Batur initially studied at the Computer Science Department of Antalya Bilim University, but as his YouTube career evolved he enrolled in the Cinema and Television Department of Nişantaşı University.

In 2017, he won the first ever Best YouTuber/Instagrammer Award at the 44th Golden Butterfly Awards, but the organization later took the award back. In 2018, he won the Social Media Phenomenon of the Year award at the 5th Golden Palm Awards. His first movie, Enes Batur Hayal mi Gerçek mi?, in which he shared the leading role with Ceyda Düvenci and Bekir Akso, was released on 19 January 2018 and sold ₺17.4 million. It was followed by a sequel titled Enes Batur Gerçek Kahraman on 31 May 2019, which sold ₺7.3. In 2019, Batur joined Survivor Turkey as a guest contestant and competed in one episode of the show.

In April and May 2020, it was reported the a YouTube channel called Oyuncak Avı had garnered over 8 million followers over a short period of time, surpassing Batur as the most-subscribed Turkish channel according to data published by SocialBlade. SocialBlade did not change Enes Batur's on position its list, as Oyuncak Avı was classified as an American YouTube channel. Enes Batur closed their YouTube channel on October 9, 2025, for personal reasons, but re-opened 20 days later, on October 29.

== Personal life ==
Batur was in a relationship with fellow YouTuber Başak Karahan between 2017 and 2018. On 23 May 2019, news of his marriage to Damla Aslanalp surfaced on the media with Batur publishing the wedding photographs on his social media accounts. Yet, his followers did not believe it and labeled it as an advertisement for his new film. In June 2019, Batur confirmed the rumors through a live video on Instagram and stated that the marriage was fake.

== Allegations of copying popular YouTubers and channel termination threat ==
On 4 August 2019, YouTuber JT posted a video that exposed Batur copying material from several YouTubers such as PewDiePie and MrBeast. JT alleged that Batur had copied PewDiePie's Minecraft series by posting a thumbnail similar to PewDiePie's and reenacted everything PewDiePie did. After JT published the video, Batur issued a copyright strike, saying that JT had used his audio without permission. The strike was later overturned, but JT asked for Batur's channel to be terminated for violating the rules of YouTube's copyright claim system. Batur later blocked users who had questioned him about the allegations on his social media pages. Allegations continued after Batur's channel was featured in YouTube Rewind 2019: For the Record despite the violations JT listed.

== Filmography ==
- Enes Batur Hayal mi Gerçek mi? (2018)
- Maşa ile Koca Ayı 2: Sonsuz Arkadaşlık (2018)
- Kafalar Karışık (2018)
- Enes Batur: Gerçek Kahraman (2019)

== Discography ==
Singles

- "Sen Yerinde Dur (featuring Kaya Giray)" (2018) (from Enes Batur Hayal mi? Gerçek mi? movie soundtrack)
- "Gel Hadi Gel (featuring Kaya Giray)" (2018)
- "Dolunay" (2019)
- "Biliyom" (2020)
- "Yüreğine İnan" (2020)
- "Ayaz" (2021)
- "ÖZLEM" (2025)

== Awards ==
- 2017: Golden Butterfly Awards – "Best YouTuber/Instagrammer" (taken back)
- 2018: Golden Palm Awards – "Social Media Phenomenon of the Year"
