= Ami Rodríguez =

Colombian YouTuber

- Rodríguez at the 27th Annual Latin Grammy Awards, 2026
- Born: 18 May 1994 (age 32); Bogotá, Colombia
- Occupation: YouTuber

YouTube information
- Channel: Ami Rodriguez
- Years active: 2009–present
- Subscribers: 29.1 million
- Last updated: 29 June 2024

Ami Rodríguez Pascagaza (born 18 May 1994, in Bogotá) is a Colombian Internet personality. He was the first Colombian YouTuber to reach 10 million subscribers. As of October 2019, he has the highest subscriber count out of Colombian YouTubers.

After registering his YouTube account in 2009, Rodríguez posts family-friendly content on his channel.

== Biography ==
Rodríguez was born in Bogotá, Colombia on 18 May 1994. He started his YouTube channel in 2009, and produces family-friendly content.

In 2017, Rodríguez participated in a tour of the Latin American telenovela Soy Luna. In 2018, Rodriguez released a song in collaboration with Sofía Castro, titled "Mor". In that same year, Rodríguez was invited to YouTube Rewind 2018: Everyone Controls Rewind, an official YouTube video that compiles the most important events of the year on that platform.

Rodriguez has an additional 6 channels on the platform besides his main channel (Ami Rodriguez), three of which are inactive.
