= Pencilmation =

American flash animated web series

YouTube information
- Channel: Pencilmation
- Years active: 2004–present
- Genres: Film; animation; comedy
- Subscribers: 20.4 million
- Views: 12.1 billion
- Last updated: October 11, 2025

Pencilmation is an American flash animated comedy web series on YouTube created by Ross Bollinger. The series follows the endless struggle between creator and creation as pencil-drawn stick figures and doodles come to life and grapple against the torment of their animator's pencil and his arsenal of other drawing implements. The cartoon can be recognized by its trademark ruled paper backdrop, traditional frame-by-frame animation technique, inclusion of pencils and other drawing material, energetic music, classic cartoonish sound effects, simplistic character designs, and a mix of slapstick, situational comedy, meta, and doodle-based humor.

Full episode "Turn That Crown Upside Down"

As of December 2021, Pencilmation is the 260th most subscribed channel, the 225th most viewed channel, the 104th most subscribed channel from the US, the 15th most subscribed channel in the Film category, and the largest (most subscribed and most viewed) 2D animation-focused original creator channel on all of YouTube.

== History ==
Ross Bollinger was born in Charlottesville, Virginia on November 15, 1987. He has 3 siblings; sisters Ama Bollinger (born 1996), Kate Bollinger (born 1997), who is a musician, and younger brother Will Bollinger (born 1993), who is six years his junior and serves as the inspiration for Wolly from his series Gil Next Door. Two of Bollinger's favorite shows were Rocko's Modern Life and SpongeBob SquarePants, which served as inspirations for Gil Next Door. Bollinger was introduced to animation as an art form via claymation when he was in school. At age 10, Bollinger started doing animation, taking a home video camera and doing stop motion with little clay creatures that generally ate up each other, beat up each other, and blew up the world. At age 12, Bollinger started to get into Macromedia Flash, simply experimenting with the program while not knowing what he was doing. At age 16, after being inspired from watching the Daffy Duck cartoon Duck Amuck, Bollinger created the first Pencilmation cartoon and uploaded it to Newgrounds.com. Bollinger worked alone and was responsible for every aspect of creating the cartoon, including writing, drawing, animating, sound designing, composing, and voice acting, a trend that would more or less continue for the first few dozen Pencilmation episodes.

=== 2004–2008: Beginning ===
On June 4, 2004, Bollinger uploaded the very first Pencilmation cartoon onto Newgrounds. It was received with high praise and would end up being awarded a Daily Feature from the site. One year later, on October 31, 2005, Bollinger would upload the second installment, "Pencilmation #2". This too was well-received and ended up winning a Frontpaged award along with other accolades. Between 2006 and 2008, Bollinger stepped back from Pencilmation and started work on other animated projects, such as the short-lived dialogue-based series "Generic Brand Cartoons" in 2006 and the 2008 short film "The Mosquito Who Gave Up Blood". His work was introduced to a nationwide audience when it was used on The CW series Online Nation.

=== 2009–2011: Early YouTube era ===
After a 3-year hiatus, Bollinger returned to his Pencilmation series for a college project back when he was attending the School of Visual Arts, citing the reason being a preferred format for doing animated shorts with simple little characters, being faster to animate. Bollinger then had an idea. He started making “mc hammered”, And then having another idea, he created “amour than enough”. Then He Saw Another Creator Draw A Beard, And Decided To Test It. It Worked. Then He Maked “To Beard Or Not To Beard” When He Tested Drawing Fatness. The Idea Was “Turtles In Time” When He Tested Drawing Turtles, Making Hank’s Debut. The Second Idea Was “Malice In Wonderland”, Then “DiscOh-No!”, And Followed By “Love At First Write” And “Hook Line And Stinker”. Bollinger then uploaded all previous episodes onto his new YouTube channel and produced a total of ten new episodes during 2009, attempting to make each one every fortnight. In April 2010, "Pencilmation #10", Hook, Line and Stinker, won 1st Place in Animation at the 31st College Television Awards hosted by the Academy of Television Arts and Sciences Foundation.

=== 2011–2012: Hank Hanky period ===
After the release of "Pencilmation #19", Bollinger branched out to other projects. A four-part sister series titled Mythtory of the World was created. Also during this time, Hank Hanky, a figure who had been featured in a number of Pencilmation episodes and came to overshadow the original Pencilmation lead figure, was highly emphasized. The recognizable style of pencils drawing dialogue-absent doodles coming to life on a ruled paper background was dropped in favor of more traditional methods and having Hank speak. A few segments dubbed "The Hank Hanky Show" were produced, where viewers (mostly children) called a toll-free number to leave voice messages for Hank to answer. During this time, Bollinger drastically changed the layout of his official Pencilmation site and that of the Pencilmation Facebook page, pretending he was Hank taking over the program.

=== 2012–2014: Return to form ===
At the start of Pencilmation's Season 2 in mid-2012, Pencilmation #20 was produced. Following these new episodes, Hank Hanky and all non-Pencilmation material was soon phased out, with few exceptions down the road.

=== 2014–2017: Early collaborative period ===
For the first 36 episodes of Pencilmation, barring music and occasional animation assistance, Bollinger did all of the work solely by himself. From "Pencilmation #37" onward, a trend began that saw Bollinger delegating more and more responsibilities to other creatives, whether it be with the writing, animation, sound designing, composing, or voice acting. Bollinger would stay on as director and executive producer, and then eventually just executive producer and occasional writer.

=== 2017–2018: Early production team period ===
By this period, Pencilmation had become a well-oiled machine, each intricate process handled by several hands, the animation style becoming much more extravagant and sophisticated. Several new episodes were being produced every week, a process that once took Bollinger several weeks per episode by himself. A regular cast of recurring characters had been established.

=== 2018–2023: Rise in popularity ===
In 2019, Pencilmation was featured in YouTube's annual YouTube Rewind, being acknowledged as the third most viewed creator channel of the year with 2.8 billion views. Between 2018 and 2020, Pencilmation's subscriber count exploded from a little more than 1 million to over 18 million, the channel views count from tens of millions to over 9 billion. This was largely in part due to YouTube's internal algorithm promoting videos on its YouTube Kids platform, as well as considerable exposure from being included as a part of the 2019 YouTube Rewind video recap. By the end of 2020, Bollinger and company had produced the 500th episode of Pencilmation.

By 2023, Pencilmation was still helmed by Bollinger and employed a global, remote team of hundreds of artists, writers, and production staff.

== Seasons ==
Season	Episodes	Originally Aired	
Season	Episodes	First Aired	Last Aired
1	20	June 4, 2004; 22 years ago	July 9, 2011; 15 years ago
1.5	4	January 28, 2012; 14 years ago	April 28, 2012; 14 years ago
2	11	May 26, 2012; 14 years ago	December 17, 2012; 13 years ago
3	10	January 25, 2013; 13 years ago	December 17, 2014; 11 years ago
4	11	January 16, 2015; 11 years ago	March 11, 2016; 10 years ago
5	8	March 26, 2016; 10 years ago	August 19, 2016; 10 years ago
6	11	September 2, 2016; 10 years ago	November 30, 2016; 9 years ago
7	23	December 7, 2016; 9 years ago	March 28, 2017; 9 years ago
8	15	March 31, 2017; 9 years ago	May 19, 2017; 9 years ago
9	14	May 23, 2017; 9 years ago	July 7, 2017; 9 years ago
10	17	July 11, 2017; 9 years ago	September 12, 2017; 9 years ago
11	23	September 8, 2017; 9 years ago	December 1, 2017; 8 years ago
12	21	December 5, 2017; 8 years ago	February 13, 2018; 8 years ago
13	22	February 16, 2018; 8 years ago	May 1, 2018; 8 years ago
14	20	May 4, 2018; 8 years ago	July 17, 2018; 8 years ago
15	21	July 19, 2018; 8 years ago	September 11, 2018; 8 years ago
16	21	September 13, 2018; 8 years ago	November 17, 2018; 8 years ago
17	26	November 20, 2018; 8 years ago	January 31, 2019; 7 years ago
18	25	February 2, 2019; 7 years ago	March 30, 2019; 7 years ago
19	25	April 2, 2019; 7 years ago	June 13, 2019; 7 years ago
20	25	June 15, 2019; 7 years ago	August 31, 2019; 7 years ago
21	26	September 3, 2019; 7 years ago	November 30, 2019; 6 years ago
22	27	December 3, 2019; 6 years ago	March 3, 2020; 6 years ago
23	25	March 7, 2020; 6 years ago	May 30, 2020; 6 years ago
24	25	June 2, 2020; 6 years ago	August 25, 2020; 6 years ago
25	26	August 29, 2020; 6 years ago	December 12, 2020; 5 years ago
26	26	December 15, 2020; 5 years ago	April 10, 2021; 5 years ago
27	27	April 13, 2021; 5 years ago	July 17, 2021; 5 years ago
28	23	July 20, 2021; 5 years ago	October 5, 2021; 5 years ago
29	29	October 9, 2021; 5 years ago	January 15, 2022; 4 years ago
30	24	January 18, 2022; 4 years ago	April 5, 2022; 4 years ago
31	25	April 9, 2022; 4 years ago	July 2, 2022; 4 years ago
32	25	July 5, 2022; 4 years ago	September 27, 2022; 4 years ago
33	27	October 1, 2022; 4 years ago	December 27, 2022; 3 years ago
34	20	January 7, 2023; 3 years ago	May 20, 2023; 3 years ago

== Episodes ==
Episode No.	Episode Name	Season	Release Year
1	The First Pencilmation	1	2004
2	The Pen is Mightier	1	2005
3	MC Hammered	1	2009
4	Amour Than Enough	1	2009
5	To Beard or Not to Beard	1	2009
6	Turtles In Time	1	2009
"The Lost Episode"	The Long and Short of It	1	2009
7	Malice in Wonderland	1	2009
8	DiscOh-No!	1	2009
9	Love at First Write	1	2009
10	Hook, Line, and Stinker	1	2009
11	Home is Where the Hurt is	1	2009
12	Bounce for Bounce	1	2010
13	Moondoggled	1	2010
14	Cone Head	1	2010
15	A Sheepcar Named de'Fire	1	2010
Mini Episode	Hank Draws a Girlfriend	N/A	2011
16	Hank Gets Colored in	1	2011
17	Hank Speaks	1	2011
18	Frank's Masterpeice	1	2011
19	Original Pencilmation Returns	1	2011
M1	The Caveman	1.5	2012
M2	Ancient Egypt	1.5	2012
M3	The Olympic Games	1.5	2012
M4	The Silk Road	1.5	2012
20	Bettermorphisis	2	2012
21	Rancour's Away	2	2012
22	Bee Mine	2	2012
23	The Wheel McCoy	2	2012
24	Plight of the Living Dude	2	2012
25	Taxi and I Know It	2	2012
26	Star Wombs	2	2012
27	Flower Power	2	2012
28	Abracadabraham Lincoln	2	2012
29	Tricky Treat	2	2012
2012 Christmas Special	Peril of the Bells	2	2012
30	Affair Thee Well	3	2013
31	Applecalypse Now	3	2013
32	Bubblegum Grump	3	2013
33	X Marks the Spot	3	2013
2013 Christmas Special	Do you Like My Decorations	3	2013
34	A Hole New World	3	2014
35	Catson Pawlik	3	2014
36	Rabbitersweet Goodbye	3	2014
37	Cop Out	3	2014
38	A Christmas Pencilmation	3	2014
39	Uneasy Rider	4	2015
40	Checked Out	4	2015
41	A-Door-Able	4	2015
42	The Workout	4	2015
43	Harry Potter	4	2015
44	Border Disorder	4	2015
45	Cat Me If You Can	4	2015
46	His and Hercules	4	2016
47	Sunday Funday	4	2016
48	Melt Down	4	2016
49	Soda Machine	4	2016
50	Puppy Love	5	2016
51	The Love Bug	5	2016
52	Word Play	5	2016
53	Hamburgirl	5	2016
54	Bicep Blowout	5	2016
55	Ghostbusters	5	2016
56	Mini Mischief	5	2016
57	Rope-a-Dope	5	2016
58	Newlywebs	6	2016
59	Target-Me-Not	6	2016
60	Grouch Potato	6	2016
61	Ballooney Tune	6	2016
62	Mario Gets Fat	6	2016
63	B-Ball Basket Case	6	2016
64	On the Fly	6	2016
65	The Dastardly Doodle	6	2016
66	Floral Folly	6	2016
67	Munch Ado About Nothing	6	2016
68	The Hulk Hop	6	2016
69	The Gap Trap	7	2016
70	All's Noel That Ends Well	7	2016
71	Ups and Downs	7	2016
72	Worm and Fuzzy	7	2016
73	Indipendence Day	7	2017
74	Mayday! Mermaiday!	7	2017
75	Splitting Hares	7	2017
76	Tempo Tantrum	7	2017
77	Mood Swings	7	2017
78	State of the Heart	7	2017
79	Hand Off	7	2017
80	Funny Phone	7	2017
81	A-Head of the Game	7	2017
82	A Fishy Fable	7	2017
83	Postal Disservice	7	2017
84	Chest Pains	7	2017
85	Butt of the Joke	7	2017
86	Flame and Glory	7	2017
87	Ding, Dong, Dang!	7	2017
88	Cartastrophe!	7	2017
89	Bugged Out	7	2017
90	Stupor Hero	7	2017
91	Partly Cloudy with a Chance of Pain	7	2017
92	Fro-Down	8	2017
93	Puddle Puzzle	8	2017
94	Steak Mistake	8	2017
95	Hairdo's and Don'ts	8	2017
96	TV Trauma	8	2017
97	Door to Door	8	2017
98	Dumbell Dummy	8	2017
99	Nuts and Bolts	8	2017
100	Scratch 22	8	2017
101	Cast Awry	8	2017
102	Cake It or Break It	8	2017
103	Spring It On	8	2017
104	Outboxed	8	2017
105	None Direction	8	2017
106	Plant Rant	8	2017
107	The Texas Seesaw Massacare	9	2017
108	One Boo Over the Cuckoo's Nest	9	2017
109	Line and Dine	9	2017
110	A Farewell to Alarms	9	2017
111	Unfarted Territory	9	2017
112	Special Abouncement	9	2017
113	Dawn of the Lead	9	2017
114	Putt's Up Doc?	9	2017
115	Simply Marbleous	9	2017
116	Art Attack	9	2017
117	Graphical Error	9	2017
118	Eggs Marks the Spot	9	2017
119	Bug to the Future	9	2017
120	The Lamp Champ	9	2017
121	A Tall Tale	10	2017
122	Gold Fashioned	10	2017
123	Fire Straits	10	2017
124	Bait and Switch	10	2017
125	O Pencil Where art Thou	10	2017
126	Muscle Madness	10	2017
127	Hot or Not	10	2017
128	Clowning Around	10	2017
129	Hat's All Folks	10	2017
130	Man of The Flower	10	2017
131	Dead Start	10	2017
132	Coffee Craze	10	2017
133	Ant Misbehaving	10	2017
134	Washout!	10	2017
135	UFO OMG	10	2017
136	Pasta La Vista, Baby	10	2017
137	Twin Geeks	11	2017
138	The Scaredy Song	10	2017
139	Random Act of Cuteness	11	2017
140	No Fun in the Sun	11	2017
141	Bomb's Away	11	2017
142	Tall Tails	11	2017
143	Remote Contolled	11	2017
144	Scrambled Legs	11	2017
145	The Sword & The Groan	11	2017
146	Having a Blast	11	2017
147	Pail Problems	11	2017
148	Murder She Note	11	2017
149	Spin There, Done That	11	2017
150	The Forbidden Flute	11	2017
151	Crave From The Grave	11	2017
152	Love is Blind	11	2017
153	Bubble Trouble	11	2017
154	Unchairable	11	2017
155	Shock and Roll	11	2017
156	Teeth for Two	11	2017
157	Housebroken	11	2017
158	Fan Fiction	11	2017
159	Call or Nothing	11	2017
160	Femme Fatality	11	2017
161	Sit My Baby One More Time	12	2017
162	Harry Potter #2	12	2017
163	The Hole Story	12	2017
164	Gifted and Talented	12	2017
165	Dumb & Dumberell	12	2017
166	Not-So-Silent Night	12	2017
167	The Grapes of Math	12	2017
168	Runner Up	12	2017
169	Show and Spell	12	2018
170	Bladder Runner	12	2018
171	Snow Man's Land	12	2018
172	All Ears	12	2018
173	Cowboy Meets World	12	2018
174	Tack in the Box	12	2018
175	Fridge Over Troubled Water	12	2018
176	Odorable	12	2018
177	Sick Flick	12	2018
178	Never a Doll Moment	12	2018
179	Diaper Another Day	12	2018
180	Hiccup in Arms	12	2018
181	Cock-a-Doodle Dude	12	2018
182	That Sinking Feeling	13	2018
183	Lolligags	13	2018
184	Call of the Child	13	2018
185	Food Fighters	13	2018
186	Ball and Strain	13	2018
187	Phoney Baloney	13	2018
188	Chopsticky Situation	13	2018
189	Out of Sight	13	2018
190	No Bus No Fuss	13	2018
191	No Pain, No Game	13	2018
192	Button Rouge	13	2018
193	Easter Egg-Scapade	13	2018
194	Couch Surfing	13	2018
195	Haunted Mouse	13	2018
196	Notourious P.I.G	13	2018
197	Caught of Card	13	2018
198	One Man's Trash Is Another Man	13	2018
199	The Tell Tale Art	13	2018
200	Hole in None	13	2018
201	Bedtime Blues	13	2018
202	Well Off	13	2018
203	Nutty by Nature	13	2018
204	Lord of the Fries	14	2018
205	Panic! At the Window	14	2018
206	In a Pickle	14	2018
207	Love Burps	14	2018
208	Breezy Peezy	14	2018
209	Rock, Paper, Scissors, Oh My!	14	2018
210	Climb and Punishment	14	2018
211	A Kight to Remember (Two Parter)	14	2018
212	All That Litters is Not Gold	14	2018
213	Alarmed and Dangerous	14	2018
214	UFO... Uh-Oh!	14	2018
215	Mathterpiece Theater	14	2018
216	Heap of Trouble	14	2018
217	Pancake's Labyrinth	14	2018
218	For Crying Out Cloud	14	2018
219	Children of the Popcorn	14	2018
220	Preggers Can't Be Choosers	14	2018
221	Lump in the Night	14	2018
222	Keep Clam and Carry On (Two Parter)	14	2018
223	Pain in the Mutt	14	2018
224	Pasta Point of No Return	15	2018
225	Fall by Myself (Two Parter)	15	2018
226	All Helium Breaks Loose	15	2018
227	Page Fright	15	2018
228	Shoe La La	15	2018
229	Click Flick	15	2018
230	Nib and Tuck	15	2018
231	Sir Dance-A-Lot	15	2018
232	Icing on the Skate	15	2018
233	Dark Side of the Balloon	15	2018
234	Rain Woman	15	2018
235	What Lurks in the Shaddow Puppets	15	2018
236	Drip Off the Old Block	15	2018
237	A Whole Newton World	15	2018
238	Sweep Stakes	15	2018
239	Stop the Presses	15	2018
240	No Restroom for the Wicked	15	2018
241	Pie Hard	15	2018
242	A Hard Act to Swallow	15	2018
243	Mermaid of Honor	15	2018
244	Bride and Gloom	15	2018
245	Fight Flub	16	2018
246	Lawn and Order	16	2018
247	A Midsummer Nightmare	16	2018
248	In Plane Sight	16	2018
249	Setting the Bar Low	16	2018
250	My Little Phony	16	2018
251	The Head Bang Theory	16	2018
252	A Date Worse Than Death	16	2018
253	Doggie Baggage	16	2018
254	Pencilmatrix	16	2018
255	Don't Shoot the Massager	16	2018
256	A Good Tan is Hard To Find	16	2018
257	Mate in the Moon	16	2018
258	Tragic Wand	16	2018
259	You Had Me at Holloween	16	2018
260	Seize the Doomsday	16	2018
261	Stark, Raving Dad	16	2018
262	Things That Go Bump in the Night	16	2018
263	Oh My Godzilla	16	2018
264	Should I Play or Should I Go	16	2018
265	Man's Best Fiend	16	2018
266	Buzzer Beater	17	2018
267	Clover the Top	17	2018
268	Cawtionary Tale	17	2018
269	System of a Clown	17	2018
270	Snow and Tell	17	2018
271	Joined at the Hippie	17	2018
272	Reaper by the Dozen	17	2018
273	Ghost of Christmas Presents	17	2018
274	Whistle While You Housework	17	2018
275	Hail Santa	17	2018
276	Sight for Dinosaur Eyes	17	2018
277	Taming of the Stew	17	2018
278	Wishful Thinking	17	2019
279	You Drive Me Crayon	17	2019
280	Off the Recorder	17	2019
281	Spice Guys Finish Last	17	2019
282	The Ipodd Couple	17	2019
283	Neither Hair Nor There	17	2019
284	It's an Unkind of Magic	17	2019
285	More Bang for Your Duck	17	2019
286	Age Against the Machine	17	2019
287	Ship on Your Shoulder	17	2019
288	Dragon and On and On	17	2019
289	Spies Up Your Life	17	2019
290	Conflict of Internet	17	2019
291	Face Oddity	17	2019
292	Science Fair and Square	18	2019
293	Going Coco-Nuts	18	2019
294	Stiff Upper Lift	18	2019
295	Past But Not Least	18	2019
296	Hansel and Regretsel	18	2019
297	The Shower Must Go On	18	2019
298	Closet Encounters	18	2019
299	What Goes Pup Must Come Down	18	2019
300	All Thumbs	18	2019
301	The Cart of War	18	2019
302	The Princess and the Fraud	18	2019
303	Sweet Genes	18	2019
304	Talent Show Off	18	2019
305	Live & Let Dine	18	2019
306	Meat Fighter	18	2019
307	Kicked in the Class	18	2019
308	Elvis Impressley	18	2019
309	Catch Me If You Cannon	18	2019
310	Bathroom for Improvement	18	2019
311	A Splice of Life	18	2019
312	A Force of Signature	18	2019
313	Strife on Mars	18	2019
314	Citizen Train	18	2019
315	I Spider	18	2019
316	Mission Improbable	18	2019
317	Mind the Cap	19	2019
318	Turn That Crown Upside down	19	2019
319	Gingerbready or Not	19	2019
320	Wool Me Once...	19	2019
321	Eat the Parents!	19	2019
322	Easter Egg-Cess	19	2019
323	Sumockery	19	2019
324	Truth or Hair	19	2019
325	What's All the Hoopla	19	2019
326	Shake It Till You Make It	19	2019
327	Once in a Brew Moon	19	2019
328	In the Long Run	19	2019
329	Jail Mouse Rock	19	2019
330	Between a Sock and a Hard Place	19	2019
331	The Big, the Bad, and the Piggy	19	2019
332	Gum and Gummer	19	2019
333	I'm with Cupid	19	2019
334	Receding Airline	19	2019
335	Don't Give a Dam	19	2019
336	Pretty Fly for a Pencil Guy	19	2019
337	No Chess for the Wicked	19	2019
338	Scary-Go Round	19	2019
339	Romesick	19	2019
340	Hair Force One	19	2019
341	What a Maroon	19	2019
342	Three Hikes, You're Out	20	2019
343	Bus a Move	20	2019
344	Hat Today Gone Tomorrow	20	2019
345	No Man's Hand	20	2019
346	Do It Yourselfie	20	2019
347	Prophet Margins	20	2019
348	May the Horse Be with You	20	2019
349	Magic Mic	20	2019
350	There's Snow Globe Like Home	20	2019
351	An Inconvenient Tooth	20	2019
352	Kite-Astrophe	20	2019
353	Score Loser	20	2019
354	Pit of Despair	20	2019
355	Cruisin' for a Bruisin'	20	2019
356	Battery Will Get You Everywhere!	20	2019
357	X-tracurricular Activities	20	2019
358	I Know What You Did Last Number	20	2019
359	Good as Gold Fish	20	2019
360	Keyboard to Success	20	2019
361	Put the Pebble to the Metal	20	2019
362	Geese Lightning	20	2019
363	Pain in my Bunsen	20	2019
364	Sign Language	20	2019
365	The Birth of a Crustacean	20	2019
366	An Office You Can't Refuse	20	2019
367	Never Letter Go	21	2019
368	Hangman's Not	21	2019
369	Thanks for the Meowmories	21	2019
370	Whistle Me This	21	2019
371	Tonsils and Regretel	21	2019
372	Suit Yourself!	21	2019
373	License and Sensibility	21	2019
374	Fry So Serious	21	2019
375	A League of Their Gnome	21	2019
376	Host Busters	21	2019
377	Don't Have a Towel, Man!	21	2019
378	Tag Reflex	21	2019
379	Pick Up the Pastry	21	2019
380	Pencilmating Call	21	2019
381	Law & Disorder	21	2019
382	Better Date Than Never	21	2019
383	Full Housemate	21	2019
384	Campfired Up	21	2019
385	Bad Will Hunting	21	2019
386	Canary Canary Quite Contrary	21	2019
387	Jokemon	21	2019
388	In Lifegaurd We Trust	21	2019
389	Safety Worst	21	2019
390	Soaplessly Devoted	21	2019
391	Drawing a Blanket	21	2019
392	No Arm Done	21	2019
393	Less is Moral	22	2019
394	Newborn This Way	22	2019
395	Live and Let High-Five	22	2019
396	At My Zits End	22	2019
397	Ship Happens	22	2019
398	Sofa So Good	22	2019
399	Life of Pine	22	2019
400	Through the Looking Glass	22	2019
401	Polly Polly Oxen Free	22	2019
402	Zest in Show	22	2020
403	The Holy Rail	22	2020
404	Owl Night Long	22	2020
405	Big Miscake	22	2020
406	Publicity Stunned	22	2020
407	The Collector	22	2020
408	A Cymbal Plan	22	2020
409	Splash Attack	22	2020
410	Bossed in Space	22	2020
411	Oh My Gaurd!	22	2020
412	Ready, Pet, Go	22	2020
413	Cut the Clap	22	2020
414	I Think, Therefore I Amnesia	22	2020
415	Signal and Void	22	2020
416	That's Printertainment!	22	2020
417	Vent Outta Shape	22	2020
418	One Flu Over the Cuckoo's Nest	22	2020
419	Bust a Movie	22	2020
420	The Brave and the Old	23	2020
421	Hellevator	23	2020
422	Cheese Your Own Adventure	23	2020
423	Lens with Benefits	23	2020
424	Headphones Over Heels	23	2020
425	Statues Your Own Adventure	23	2020
426	Flake It Till You Make It!	23	2020
427	Bippity Boppity Bummer	23	2020
428	Yankee Doodle Candy	23	2020
429	Well That Escalator Quickly	23	2020
430	The Fountain of Doof	23	2020
431	Toast Busters	23	2020
432	Past, President, and Future	23	2020
433	Walk of Lame	23	2020
434	My Bear Lady	23	2020
435	Fly Me to the Soup	23	2020
436	Me, Myself, and Guide Dog	23	2020
437	Pump My Ride	23	2020
438	Wish Hunt	23	2020
439	It's a Card Knock Life	23	2020
440	Life's a Hitch	23	2020
441	We Get By	23	2020
442	Act Your Rage	23	2020
443	Socky Horror Picture Show	23	2020
444	Primp My Ride	23	2020
445	My Own Worst Penemy	24	2020
446	Locked Out Syndrome	24	2020
447	Free for Launch Tuesday?	24	2020
448	What a Call	24	2020
449	Pranks for the Memories	24	2020
450	Whose Line Up is it Anyway??	24	2020
451	Typo Writer	24	2020
452	To Bean or Not to Bean	24	2020
453	Kiss and Digital	24	2020
454	Ready, Tame, Fire!	24	2020
455	Right Back Achoo!	24	2020
456	A Dramatic Burn of Events	24	2020
457	The Tell Tail Heart	24	2020
458	Cheetos Never Prosper	24	2020
459	Drop It Like It's Dot	24	2020
460	Forever Tounge	24	2020
461	Leaf It to Me	24	2020
462	Catcall Me If You Can	24	2020
463	In-Terror-Gation	24	2020
464	Lights, Camoflauge, Action!	24	2020
465	What's Syrup Doc?	24	2020
466	Whole Lotto Love	24	2020
467	Faliure to Lunch	24	2020
468	Pennies From Heaven	24	2020
469	Scribe Me a River	24	2020
470	Merch & Foremost	25	2020
471	Magnet Opus	25	2020
472	Don't Push My Buttons	25	2020
473	Veg of Aliance	25	2020
474	Keep Calm and Cry On	25	2020
475	Be Fairy, Fairy Quiet...	25	2020
476	End of the World Wide Web	25	2020
477	Black Out	25	2020
478	March of the Pencilmate	25	2020
479	Bulb Fiction	25	2020
480	Vending Over Backwards	25	2020
481	Farmageddon	25	2020
482	Stand and Delivery	25	2020
483	Petal to the Metal	25	2020
484	Something Tricked This Way Comes	25	2020
485	Chival-Reject	25	2020
486	Reborn This Way	25	2020
487	You Big Luggage	25	2020
488	Winter Blunderland	25	2020
489	Chrolophyll Harmonic	25	2020
490	Cacti of the Beholder	25	2020
491	Bad Shortsmanship	25	2020
492	Run of the Treadmill	25	2020
493	Getting Into Caricature	25	2020
494	Helter Shelter	25	2020
495	Pug Life	25	2020
496	One for the Pages	26	2020
497	Duel Intentions	26	2020
498	Deer and Present Danger	26	2020
499	Flick and Tired	26	2020
500	No Bones About It	26	2020
501	Oh, Bee-Have!	26	2021
502	Portrait in Spaz	26	2021
503	Ice Creamed	26	2021
504	Hula Hoopla	26	2021
505	Ode to Toy	26	2021
506	Toastbusters	26	2021
507	Dress to Depress	26	2021
508	Forgive and Forcast	26	2021
509	That's a Wrap	26	2021
510	Skydive Me Crazy	26	2021
511	A Star is Burned	26	2021
512	Check-Mate	26	2021
513	What's Disguise Problem	26	2021
514	Thousand Yard Stereo	26	2021
515	Give Me a Flake!	26	2021
516	Oh, Hi Market!	26	2021
517	Stop, Cotton, Roll!	26	2021
518	Almoist Famous	26	2021
519	You Thumb Drive Me Crazy	26	2021
520	Perfume Dollars More	26	2021
521	If Looks Cound Grill	26	2021
522	All Jacked Up	27	2021
523	The Disc Jerkey	27	2021
524	Park for the Course	27	2021
525	Toot to Boot	27	2021
526	Been There, Sun That!	27	2021
527	Lower the Healthbar	27	2021
528	A Pencil's Life for Me	27	2021
529	Bad Fair Day	27	2021
530	Dude Where's My Parcel	27	2021
531	The Limb Reaper	27	2021
532	Mental Detector	27	2021
533	Window Washed Up	27	2021
534	Healthy Rompetition	27	2021
535	Parking Up the Wrong Tree	27	2021
536	Drown to Buisness	27	2021
537	Load of Bullseye	27	2021
538	A River Runs Drive Thru It	27	2021
539	Dollars & Fence	27	2021
540	Dread Astairs	27	2021
541	Dumpty & Dumptier	27	2021
542	Merry Go Ground	27	2021
543	Easy Buzz It	27	2021
544	Foul Tip	27	2021
545	Drive Me Daisy	27	2021
546	Blue Collar Climb	27	2021
547	Hide and Cheat	27	2021
548	Mini Vandal	27	2021
549	Bean Around the Block	28	2021
550	Gold Habits Die Hard	28	2021
551	I'm Leavin' on a Jetpack	28	2021
552	Thoughts & Errs	28	2021
553	Cookie Clutter	28	2021
554	Up, Up, and Afraid	28	2021
555	Provoke And Mirrors	28	2021
556	Star Tangled Banner	28	2021
557	Rub the Wrong Way	28	2021
558	Don't Blow There!	28	2021
559	Meet Your Shoemaker	28	2021
560	Untapped Potential	28	2021
561	Pumpkin Snatch	28	2021
562	Lost and Sound	28	2021
563	Ok, Boomerang	28	2021
564	Save His Sole	28	2021
565	The Devil You Grow	28	2021
566	Fancy See, Fancy Do	28	2021
567	Thirst World Problems	28	2021
568	Teach a Man to Swish	28	2021
569	Skydive Hard with a Vengeance	28	2021
570	I Wanna Gold Your Hand	28	2021
571	Near and Far Fetched	28	2021
572	Extreme Breakover	29	2021
573	Sandy Cheeks	29	2021
574	Battle of the Emojima	29	2021
575	Eat, Shrink, and Be Merry	29	2021
576	Miss-Thunder-Stood	29	2021
577	Wheel of Mis-Fortune	29	2021
578	If Looks Could Kill	29	2021
579	Snotty or Nice	29	2021
580	Mic It or Leave It	29	2021
581	No Harm Done	29	2021
582	The Runny Nose	29	2021
583	Pencilm8er Boi	29	2021
584	Live and Let Diamond	29	2021
585	I'm So Printy	29	2021
586	Making a Scene	29	2021
587	Loss of Control	29	2021
588	Duty Calls	29	2021
589	Antique-Off	29	2021
590	It's Not Rocket Seance!	29	2021
591	It's Now or Neverland	29	2021
592	Bone to Be Wild	29	2021
593	Pizza Party of One	29	2021
594	My Bowl Overfloweth	29	2021
595	Last One Misunderstanding	29	2021
596	No Substitutions!	29	2022
597	Holesome Fun	29	2022
598	Not a Bright Idea	29	2022
599	Trash Bandicoot	29	2022
600	Something Sinks	29	2022
601	Love Matchually	30	2022
602	All Tied Up	30	2022
603	Can You Tailor Me Higher?	30	2022
604	Optical Intrusion	30	2022
605	Red Sled Redemption	30	2022
606	Enlighten Up, Man	30	2022
607	Drop Dread	30	2022
608	One Pit Wonder	30	2022
609	Crime Wave	30	2022
610	Full Metal Clacker	30	2022
611	The Bunglar	30	2022
612	ABCDEF Jeez	30	2022
613	Don't Pop Believing	30	2022
614	Rickshawshank Redemption	30	2022
615	Dismay to Display	30	2022
616	A Total Dis-laughter	30	2022
617	What's the Brush?	30	2022
618	Flat Outta Luck	30	2022
619	Mount Adjustmore	30	2022
620	Charmed I'm Sure	30	2022
621	Baby Got Bacteria	30	2022
622	Best Foot Forward	30	2022
623	The Ugly Tooth	30	2022
624	The Turkey to My Heart	30	2022
625	High Club Pressure	31	2022
626	Going Out on a Limbo	31	2022
627	Lower the Man Down	31	2022
628	Cake, Rattle, & Roll	31	2022
629	Better Inflate Than Never	31	2022
630	A Boom With a View	31	2022
631	Apple of My iPhone	31	2022
632	Camo Flawed	31	2022
633	Wheelchair of Fortune	31	2022
634	The Speed of Hound	31	2022
635	The Draws of Phisycs	31	2022
636	Frost in Translation	31	2022
637	Rubbered the Wrong Way	31	2022
638	Feet Play Love	31	2022
639	Twist and Sprout	31	2022
640	Goose Your Own Adventure	31	2022
641	Cash Me if You Can	31	2022
642	The Real Swim Shady	31	2022
643	Afraid of the Bark	31	2022
644	Luck of the Straw	31	2022
645	Dumbrella	31	2022
646	La La Llama Land	31	2022
647	Don't Believe the Swype	31	2022
648	Days of Our Livestream	31	2022
649	I Can Pee Clearly Now	31	2022
650	All You Can Heat	32	2022
651	All the World's a Page	32	2022
652	Ice Guys Finish Last	32	2022
653	Beauty and the Feast	32	2022
654	Creep What You Sow	32	2022
655	Space the Music	32	2022
656	Finding Emo	32	2022
657	Don't Have a Couch, Man	32	2022
658	Six Feet Hunger	32	2022
659	Dental Breakdown	32	2022
660	Truth or Swear	32	2022
661	How Blow Can You Go	32	2022
662	Flirty Dancing	32	2022
663	No Pain, No Brain	32	2022
664	Wall Things Must Pass	32	2022
665	Joined at the Hypnosis	32	2022
666	Tic Tac Mosquito	32	2022
667	Cap'n Punch	32	2022
668	Beatboxing Around the Bush	32	2022
Side Episode	The Teeth Eater	N/A	2022
669	Tapes of Wrath	32	2022
670	The Slice is Right	32	2022
671	Game of Stones	32	2022
672	The Babysitters Cub	32	2022
673	I Don't Wanna Kiss a Thing	32	2022
674	Sweet and Sour Sorcery	32	2022
675	Gameboy Meets World	33	2022
676	Mr. Grow It All	33	2022
677	Til Death Do Us Party	33	2022
678	Freaks and Greeks	33	2022
679	A Gloom With a View	33	2022
680	I Don't Reel So Good	33	2022
681	Zoom Raider	33	2022
682	Live Cough Love	33	2022
683	Jitter Sweet Symphony	33	2022
684	Smog Eat Smog World	33	2022
685	Jack of All Tardigrades	33	2022
686	Flag Racing	33	2022
687	For Richer of for Horror	33	2022
688	Fear and Clothing	33	2022
689	Train Damage	33	2022
690	Do Re Mi Spa	33	2022
691	Dr. Nope	33	2022
692	Fan 9 from Outer Space	33	2022
693	All's Fair in Love and Awards	33	2022
694	It's Kind of a Sunny Story	33	2022
695	How Do You Duel?	33	2022
696	Right Said Bread	33	2022
697	Where the Child Things Are	33	2022
698	Santa Claus Is Coming to Frown	33	2022
699	All I Want for Christmas Is a Feud	33	2022
700	Merry X-Mas and a Happy Flu Year	33	2022
701	Reap What You Mistletoe	33	2022
702	Pickle Your Battles	34	2023
703	Achy Breaky Start	34	2023
704	Rotten Eyed Joe	34	2023
705	Less Is Rumour	34	2023
706	A Tale of Two Pencils	34	2023
707	Splashes to Splashes, Dust to Dust	34	2023
708	Inside Doubt	34	2023
709	The Texas Fastfood Massacre	34	2023
710	Stress to Impress	34	2023
711	Lonley Hearts Club Bajo	34	2023
712	The Revelation Won't Be Televised	34	2023
713	Keeping It Real Estate	34	2023
714	Between a Rock and a Hard Brace	34	2023
715	Upside Walk Down	34	2023
716	Hot Off the Expression	34	2023
717	Radioactive Ga Ga	34	2023
718	Good Golly Miss Collie	34	2023
719	One for the Rodent	34	2023
720	Jumping the Ark	34	2023
721	Happily Ever Afterlife	34	2023
Side Episode	Life's Too Sport	N/A	2023
Side Episode	Sport Mission!	N/A	2023

== Characters ==
=== Main cast ===
- Pencilmate: (voiced by Joe Porter, Ross Bollinger, Oswald Garrington, Leif Grant, Vernon Dew, and Zack Sage) is the main protagonist of the series. Color: blue. The tormented yet tenacious and misfortune leader of the Pencilmation gang.
- Pencilmiss: (voiced by Kesh Misha, Ama Bollinger, Daphne Garrington, and Katie Snyder) is the secondary protagonist of the series. Color: pink. The assertive, smart, and sweet character with a bit olf a silly side. She is Pencilmate's romantic companion.
- The Pencil: draws both the characters and the world itself, as they are very mischievous and are typically the one behind the antics the gang goes through.
- Mini-Pencilmate: AKA Mini P and/or Mini Mate (voiced by Joe Porter, Ross Bollinger, Oswald Garrington, Leif Grant, and Vernon Dew) is the hyper and mischievous young neighborhood boy who pals around with Pencilmate and crew. Color: yellow. He is constantly finding himself in trouble.
- Tall Guy: AKA Orange Guy (voiced by Joe Porter, Oswald Garrington, and Leif Grant). Color: orange. The high-strung but friendly member of the ensemble.
- Big Guy: AKA Big Red Block and/or Red Box Guy (voiced by Joe Porter, Oswald Garrington, and Leif Grant). Color: red. The strong yet sometimes cowardly gentle giant of the group.
- Granny: (voiced by Kesh Misha, Ama Bollinger, and Daphne Garrington). Color: green. The sneaky and beguiling wise elder of the crew.
- Lil' Miss: AKA Little Pink Girl (voiced by Kesh Misha, Ama Bollinger, and Daphne Garrington). Color: purple (formerly pink). The cute, caring little neighborhood girl whom Pencilmate and Pencilmiss look out after.

=== Other characters ===
- Infinity Snail: is the mute gastropod drifter whose inexplicable luck finds him saving the day through the power of coincidence.
- Hank Hanky: (voiced by Ross Bollinger and Joe Porter) is the thick-browed, overalls-wearing little rambunctious loudmouth who loves stealing the show and speaking his mind. Starred in The Hank Hanky Show where callers would ask Hank for advice with their personal problems.
- Bluis: AKA Little Blue Man. Color: Blue. The main protagonist of seasons 3 and 4. Just like Pencilmate, he is often tormented by the pencil.
- Tall Guy's Brother: Color: orange. Just like tall guy, except with no hair. He had a significant role in the 2017-18 episodes before his brother took over. They both first appeared together in Charmed I'm Sure
- Grandpa: Color: gray/green. The little old man who can be grouchy sometimes but overall is a good guy.
- The Bully: Color: red. The recurring antagonist who always targets Pencilmate and his friends. He first appeared in Fight Flub.
- Tiny Pencilmate: AKA Tiny P and/or Tiny Mate (voiced by Joe Porter, Ross Bollinger, Oswald Garrington, and Leif Grant). Color: brown. The antagonist of the series who was defeated in "Bad Shortsmanship". He has since appeared in other episodes as a friend.
- Color Pencils: are 9 color pencils in the show apart from the classic Pencil. These pencils are:
- Red Color Pencil: are a variant of the Pencil but red, can draw everything let it be red.
- Orange Color Pencil: are other variant of the Pencil, its a orange pencil and can draw everything of this color
- Green Color Pencil: are one of the most Color Pencils in the show, can draw everything let it be green.
- Blue Color Pencil: are other of the most Color Pencils in the show, can draw everything of blue.
- Purple Color Pencil: are a Color Pencil who can be seen in the show, can draw everything let it be purple.
- Pink Color Pencil: are a other Color Pencil who can be seen in the show, can draw everything of pink.
- White Color Pencil: is another variant of the Pencil of the Color Pencils who can be seen in the show, can draw everything of the white color.
- Brown Color Pencil: is a Color Pencil and a variant of the classic Pencil, can draw everything of brown.
