= WatchMojo =

Canadian video company

WatchMojo.com
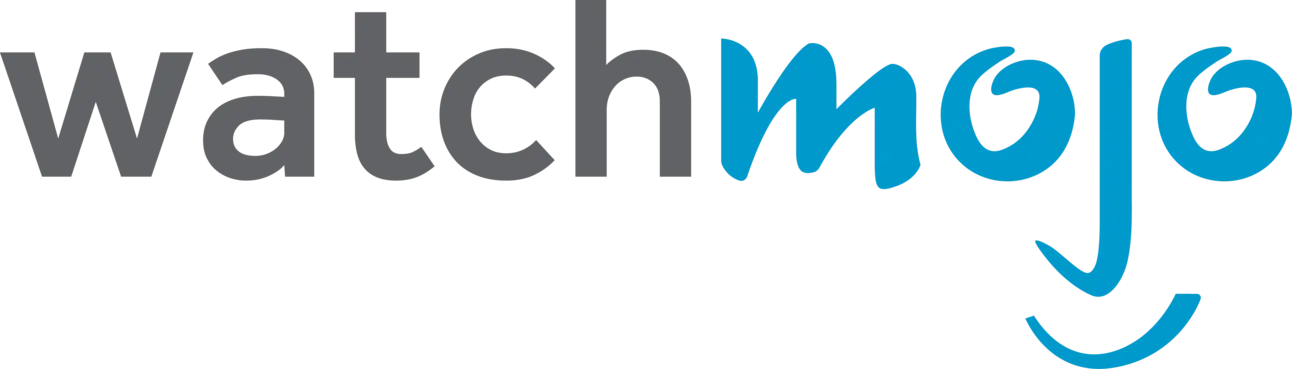
- Website type: Pop culture; infotainment
- Creators: Ashkan Karbasfrooshan; Raphael Daigneault; Christine Voulieris
- Website: watchmojo.com
- Launched: January 23, 2006
- Current status: Active
- Industry: Internet video production, distribution
- Headquarters: Montreal, Quebec, Canada
- Key people: Ashkan Karbasfrooshan (CEO)

WatchMojo is a Canadian company and website which produces and distributes internet videos. Based in Montreal, WatchMojo has over a hundred employees globally, some of whom are part-timers or freelancers. They create a very high volume of short videos with low production costs, particularly Top 10 listicles, which WatchMojo uploads to social media platforms such as YouTube.

WatchMojo was founded on January 23, 2006 by CEO Ashkan Karbasfrooshan, Christine Voulieris, Raphael Daigneault, Kevin Havill and Derek Allen. Its first six years were not financially successful. It made a variety of factual brand-friendly content and made money from commissions or licensing their videos to brands such as McDonald's and Coca-Cola. In 2012, Karbasfrooshan pivoted WatchMojo's focus to YouTube and Top 10 videos. They became popular on the platform, where they have over 30,000 videos and 25 million subscribers. At one point, they were the most-subscribed Canadian channel.

== Business ==
WatchMojo is a company and website that produces and distributes internet videos. Each month, it produces hundreds of short videos; these use relatively minimal production value (founder stated roughly $2,000 per video in 2015), and rely heavily on unlicensed copyrighted footage, citing fair use. The videos are then published on their social media platforms. WatchMojo owns over 35 YouTube channels, and also has smaller followings on Facebook, Twitter, and Snapchat. The former include the primary YouTube channel, WatchMojo.com; the identical but female-oriented MsMojo, launched in early 2016; and MojoPlays, a gaming channel created in 2017. Other channels include BrickMojo and mojocore.

WatchMojo's headquarters were located at the corners of Saint Viateur and Saint Laurent Boulevard, in Montreal, Quebec. As of 2017, it is based out of Zu, at Maison Alcan, in downtown Montreal. As of 2019, its CEO is co-founder Ashkan Karbasfrooshan. In 2016, WatchMojo had 45 full-time employees, all in Montreal. In mid-2019, WatchMojo had 70 full-time employees across Montreal, New York City, Los Angeles, and London, along with dozens of part-timers or freelancers who research, write and edit the videos. In February 2020, they had "100 full-time and part-time employees globally."

In 2006, WatchMojo reportedly signed with talent agency William Morris Endeavor. In 2018, WatchMojo signed with ICM Partners, which was acquired by Creative Artists Agency in 2022. The company's board of directors include Peter Horan and Janet Scardino. Members of its advisory board have included former AOL executive and NatGeo president Ted Prince and as of 2018, former DMG Entertainment exec Chris Fenton.

== History ==
You got these emerging platforms like YouTube. And I just felt like, you know what, if you were to create a video on every topic, eventually, you could probably hatch a business around that.

— Karbasfrooshan, 2019

Ashkan Karbasfrooshan, the founder of WatchMojo, was born in Iran, partially raised in Spain and moved to Montreal with his family as a child. While studying at the John Molson School of Business, he decided to work in the online industry. He worked at Mamma.com, a search engine based in the city, before joining the website AskMen and spending time at Montreal's sports radio station TSN 690, where he worked as a radio host covering the Montreal Expos. After leaving AskMen, Karbasfrooshan had the idea of starting a website for videos.

Karbasfrooshan, his wife Christine Voulieris, and Raphael Daigneault founded WatchMojo on January 23, 2006. (Note: A BNN Bloomberg article from 2019 claims that there were four other co-founders other than Karbasfrooshan, all of whom were still at the company.) Montreal was far removed from the major entertainment and internet businesses in the U.S., which made it difficult to see the dynamics of the industry. Karbasfrooshan started out with around $250,000 — sizeable, but small compared to their competitors — and funded WatchMojo from his commissions as a salesperson and his minority stake in AskMen. The business was met with intense skepticism from Karbafrooshan's accountants and advisors. Karbasfrooshan told Global News in 2016 that, for the first six years, WatchMojo made no revenue. He and Voulieris did not pay themselves and took out a second mortgage so that they could pay their employees. In vain, he reached out to hundreds of venture capitalists, but they eventually reached one million dollars in debt.

Nevertheless, WatchMojo continued producing content regardless of whether people would pay for it. WatchMojo's YouTube channel was created on 25 January 2007, and its reach grew rapidly. Its videos were viewed over 13 million times that year and over 28 million the next. In 2012, Karbasfrooshan decided WatchMojo should focus on YouTube and Top 10 videos, where he believed there was a bigger audience. That year, they became profitable. From 2013 to 2015, the YouTube channel grew from one million to ten million subscribers. In 2016, Karbasfrooshan was one of the 36 finalists for the title of Ernst & Young Entrepreneur of the Year in Quebec.

On 31 December 2020, WatchMojo sold a 25% stake in the company to NY-based private equity firm Star Mountain Capital.

As of July 2025, the WatchMojo.com YouTube channel has almost 26 million subscribers and has posted over 30,000 videos. In 2016, it was the most-subscribed Canadian YouTube channel. When it had 14 million subscribers in 2017, it was the 35th most-subscribed worldwide. According to Social Blade statistics in July 2026, WatchMojo.com is the sixth most-subscribed Canadian YouTube channel.

On 5 May 2026, a YouTuber named voyan made a video titled Watchmojo's Downfall Should Be Celebrated, which criticized the channel's content, format, and impact on the platform ranging from AI Generated thumbnails being used in their videos to failing to provide an accurate research on their topics over the years. Two days later, the official WatchMojo channel left a lengthy comment, claiming that they had never heard of Voyan's channel, stating their content was "ahead of the curve", and ending the comment with "haters, envious, jealous people are fuel to our fire." The response drew major backlash on social media.

On 31 May 2026, WatchMojo released a video titled "10 YouTubers Who Made Videos When They Knew They Were Dying". The video was criticised by Genna Bain, widow of YouTuber TotalBiscuit who was featured in the video. She referred to the video as a "monetized lazy listicle" and condemned the company for promoting their AI music project immediately after TotalBiscuit's mention. WatchMojo later removed all promotion of the music project from the video, and stated that all profits from the video will be sent to their charitable initiative "MojoGives".

== Content ==
=== Short videos ===
WatchMojo's videos are typically around 10 minutes long. According to Digiday, viewers typically watch the videos for 5–7 minutes. They are tailored to YouTube's recommendations system, which favours longer watch times. They require little production value and feature, under fair use, heavy use of unlicensed copyrighted footage, alongside voice-over narration.

"Top 10 Horror Games So Scary You Forgot They Existed"

— WatchMojo video title

For its first six years in business, WatchMojo made no revenue. Early on, WatchMojo stayed away from amateur YouTube culture and followed a trend in informative non-fiction videos, producing thousands of these more corporate-friendly clips. Their content varied from celebrity profiles to travel videos, with titles such as "Freestyle Motocross Jumps", "Wolverine: Origins and History", and "Cover Girl Tips For Faking It: An Eyelid Crease". Unlike YouTuber culture which favored "talking head" commentary, WatchMojo made each topic featured and rank the "star," as user-generated creativity and web series were suited to traditional television, but producing a video on every topic would eventually bring scalable financial success on YouTube. Theirs was content either commissioned by or sold to brands.

"Top 10 Best Breaking Benjamin Songs"

— WatchMojo video title

They earned money by licensing their videos to companies such as Bell Sympatico, AOL, MSN, Hulu, TV.com, Yahoo, and the websites of newspapers. Brands such as McDonald's and Coca-Cola used WatchMojo videos on promotional websites. In 2012, 80% of the company's revenue came from licensing and syndication. The rest came from advertising. That year, academic A.J. Christian wrote that WatchMojo's business model suggested that lifestyle new media content was the easiest to market to both consumers and corporations.

"Top 10 McDonald's Menu Items"

— WatchMojo video title

In 2012, Karbasfrooshan decided to shift WatchMojo's focus to YouTube, where he believed most potential viewers were, and Top 10 videos. Their content now almost exclusively consists of Top 10 videos which cover a wide variety of subjects. These videos have titles such as "Top 10 Unexpected Movie Deaths", "Top 10 Foods That Kill You", "Top 10 Controversial Symbols", and "Top 10 Christina Aguilera Videos" (MsMojo). WatchMojo video narrators include Rebecca Brayton — widely known as the "WatchMojo Lady" — Young Deuces, Phoebe De Jeu, Ricky Tucci, and Noah Baum. WatchMojo's website does not host user-generated content, but it has a "Suggestions" section where users can recommend, upvote or downvote ideas for future videos.

In 2019, Karbasfrooshan said that 80–90% of revenue comes from advertising and the licensing business still exists. The company's sponsors include the U.S. Army, Netflix, and Universal Pictures. They have interviewed celebrities such as Ed Sheeran and Ellie Goulding. During the press tour for Spider-Man: Far From Home (2019), Brayton interviewed cast members Tom Holland, Jacob Batalon, and Zendaya, and the former two said they were fans of WatchMojo.

"Top 10 Paranormal Events in Movie Shoots"

— WatchMojo video title

In February 2016, WatchMojo posted the controversial "5 Facts About Veganism". In a 2016 article titled "Top 10 'Top 10' lists that make no f**king sense whatsoever", The Daily Dot's Luke Winkie lamented the "algorithmic click-miners" of WatchMojo who occasionally produced "baffling" titles and noted that, by then, most people on YouTube had been recommended WatchMojo videos. In the student-edited Cinephile: The University of British Columbia's Film Journal, Joceline Andersen argues that WatchMojo has corporatized fan culture on YouTube by turning Top 10 rankings and the use of copyrighted footage, formerly an outlet for fans which were nevertheless an irritation for corporations, into a commercial enterprise explicitly for brands' benefit.

"Top 10 Star Trek Movies"

— WatchMojo video title

WatchMojo videos' strong use of copyrighted content has led to many Content ID copyright strikes to them over their history. In all cases, WatchMojo has argued against them, citing fair use. It was briefly terminated in 2013 because of multiple strikes. On the channel, Karbasfrooshan published several videos in 2019 to highlight instances of alleged Content ID abuse from copyright holders. His company estimated that holders unlawfully claimed over $2 billion from 2014 to 2019. He tentatively suggested that YouTubers file a class action lawsuit to obtain a monetary settlement, which led to much discussion among YouTubers, but said he hoped it would not be necessary.

=== Longform content and other ventures ===
In the late 2010s, WatchMojo started experimenting with longer content, especially after a rise in their channel's TV viewers. Karbasfrooshan said that he had wanted to establish a successful business first before making an attempt at long-form programming.

For example, in 2017, WatchMojo produced both the hockey quiz show The Lineup and The WORST Travel Show, a Facebook Watch comedy series hosted by actor Kyle Gatehouse. In a February 2019 appearance on BNN Bloomberg's The Open, Karbasfrooshan announced the launch of an entrepreneurship-focused spin-off brand called Context (later ContextTV). Prior to the 2020 U.S. presidential election, they released their first documentary, Fox in the Henhouse, about the rise of socialism and the limitations of capitalism in the nation.

By 2019, WatchMojo launched a trivia app. In May 2019, to promote Doom Patrol's first season streaming on DC Universe, Warner Bros. distributed the first episode to the YouTube channels of DC, IGN, Rotten Tomatoes, and WatchMojo, where they could be viewed free-of-charge for a limited time. In September 2019, the 45th Saturn Awards were livestreamed on social media platforms, including WatchMojo's YouTube channel, for wider reach. Karbasfrooshan also invested in the Buffer Festival, which showcases digital creators.
