= Gaurav Chaudhary =

Indian YouTuber (born 1991)

Technical Guruji
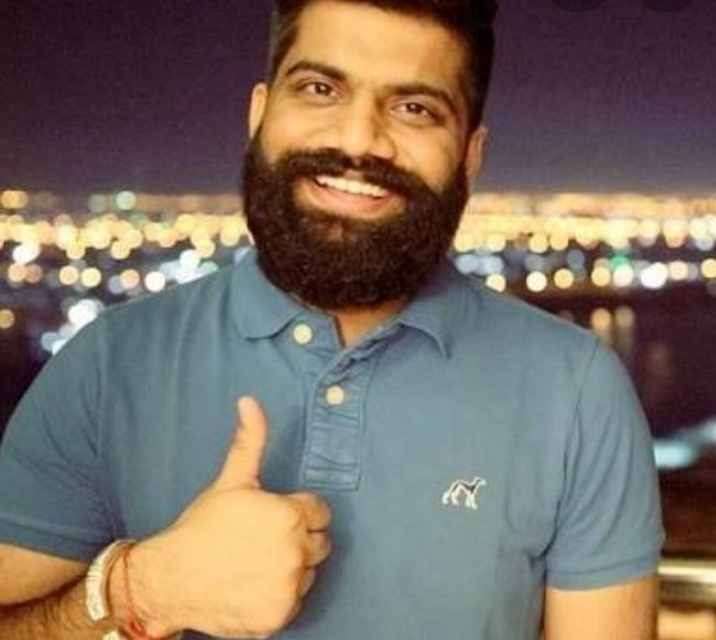
- Gaurav Chaudhary
- Born: Gaurav; 7 May 1991 (age 35); Ajmer, Rajasthan, India
- Education: Birla Institute of Technology and Science, Pilani – Dubai Campus
- Occupations: YouTuber; Tech blogger
- Years active: 2015–present

YouTube information
- Channels: Technical Guruji; Gaurav Chaudhary; TG Short
- Genres: Technology; Consumer electronics; Reviewer
- Subscribers: 23.7 million (main channel); 29.2; million (combined)
- Views: 4.03 billion (main channel); 4.43; billion (combined)
- Last updated: 19 June 2026

Gaurav Chaudhary (born 7 May 1991), popularly known as Technical Guruji, is an Indian YouTuber based in the United Arab Emirates. He is known for creating technology-related content in Hindi on YouTube.

In 2020, he was featured in the Forbes India 30 Under 30 list and claimed to have over 15 million subscribers.

== Early life ==
Chaudhary was born in Ajmer, Rajasthan in a Hindu family on 7 May 1991. He studied at a Kendriya Vidyalaya School.

== Career ==
Chaudhary launched his YouTube channel "Technical Guruji" in October 2015, primarily posting advice and product reviews. His Senior from the school owning the YouTube channel Sharmaji Technical helped him in the making of the content. In 2017, Chaudhary created a second channel, "Gaurav Chaudhary" dedicated to producing content about his personal life.

In September 2018, Technical Guruji was ranked as the 9th most subscribed to technology YouTube channel. In November 2018, it was reported that Chaudhary was the first technology YouTuber to accrue more than 10 million subscribers.

Chaudhary has appeared in YouTube Rewind 2018 and 2019.

== Videography ==
This is some selected Popular videos of Gaurav Chaudhary as known as Technical Guruji from YouTube.

Gaurav Chaudhary as Technical Guruji YouTube Videos (listed by popular videos)
Upload Date	Title	Views
7 February 2017	"My YouTube Earnings Revealed!! How Much Money I make from YouTube?"	18M+
14 June 2017	"How to Track Stolen Phone? IMEI Tracking? Find IMEI of Stolen Phone? What to do?"	16M+
13 May 2017	"Blue Whale Game - The Killer Game - Stay Away!!!"	14M+
14 May 2020	"Cleaning My Phones CarryMinati "	13M+
30 January 2019	"Redmi Note 7 Unboxing & First Look - "POWERFUL" Performance, "WEAK" Design"	11M+

== Awards and recognition ==
Gaurav Chaudhary was awarded the Tech Creator Award by the Prime Minister of India at the inaugural National Creators Award on 8 March 2024.

== See also ==
- List of YouTubers
