= Pautips =

Colombian social media personality (born 1994)

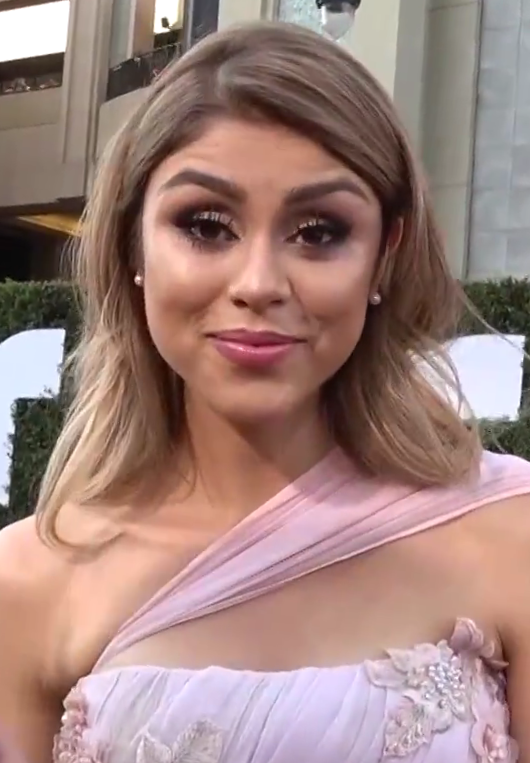
- Galindo in 2018
- Born: Paula Alejandra Galindo Suarez; 10 November 1994 (age 31); Bogotá, Colombia
- Education: Universidad del Rosario
- Years active: 2012–present

Instagram information
- Page: Paula | Makeup Skincare Beauty fashion
- Followers: 7.5 million

TikTok information
- Page: Paula Galindo
- Followers: 2.7 million

YouTube information
- Channel: Pautips
- Genres: Beauty; fashion; vlog
- Subscribers: 9.09 million
- Views: 1.07 billion
- Last updated: 27 July 2026

Paula Alejandra Galindo Suarez (born 10 November 1994), also known as Pautips, is a Colombian social media personality. She is known for her beauty and fashion videos. In 2018, she launched a brand of beauty products, Paula by Pautips.

== Early life ==
Paula Alejandra Galindo Suarez was born on 10 November 1994, in Bogotá, Colombia. Galindo studied international business at the Universidad del Rosario.

== Career ==
Before making a career out of YouTube, Galindo was only interested in makeup as a hobby. She started creating content in 2012; at the time, she was one of the only Spanish-speaking influencers on the platform.

In November 2018, Galindo launched a beauty brand, Paula by Pautips. It expanded to other Latin American countries and the U.S. the following year. In August 2019, Galindo announced that she was taking a break from YouTube to focus on overcoming depression and an eating disorder. In 2020, she appeared in the second season of the Netflix series Always a Witch.

== Personal life ==
While she was still in school, Galindo suffered from bulimia and later, anorexia. Galindo previously dated fellow YouTuber Felipe Zuluaga before breaking up. In November 2021, she began dating YouTuber Ronald Moscoso. They became engaged in November 2022 and got married the following month.

== Awards and nominations ==
Year	Award	Category	Result	Ref.
2018	Nickelodeon Kids' Choice Awards	Favorite Latin Web Star	Nominated	
2018	Streamy Awards	International	Won	
2019	MTV MIAW Awards	ICON MIAW	Nominated	
