= Primitive Technology =

YouTube channel and associated blog

YouTube information
- Channel: Primitive Technology
- Years active: 2015–2020, 2022–present
- Subscribers: 11 million
- Views: 1.24 billion
- Last updated: 13 November 2026
- Website: primitivetechnology.wordpress.com

Primitive Technology is a YouTube channel run by John Plant. Based in Far North Queensland, Australia, the series demonstrates the process of making tools and buildings using only materials found in the wild. Created in May 2015, the channel has gained over 11 million subscribers and over 1.24 billion views as of Noember 2026.

== Background ==
Plant describes his subject as a hobby, and he "lives in a modern house and eats modern food". He stated in a comment on a January 2018 video that he owns the land on which he films the videos. He states on his website that he has no Aboriginal ancestry and has not received military training.

In a correspondence with Michelle Castillo of CNBC in 2018, Plant stated that he was in his mid-30s. He also said he went to university and received a Bachelor of Science degree but "didn't do anything with it", and instead mowed lawns for a living while going out into the bush in his spare time to practice his hobby. He stated his affinity for subsisting off nature began at a young age: at 11, he would make huts by a creek behind his house using only natural materials.

== Description ==
Each video provides a closed-caption narrated account of the progress of one or more projects demonstrating the techniques and methods used to create tools or buildings. As he explains on his blog, he builds "completely from scratch using no modern tools or materials", only using what he can source from his natural environment, such as plant materials, clay, soil, and stones; creating a self-contained progression of accessible technique and implements for the projects. Episodes of the series contain no speaking, and only minimal ambient sound, usually focusing on the natural sounds of wildlife, weather, and the creek which runs near the site. Mr. Plant often records his videos wearing little except his cargo shorts, and crafted items such as handwoven cordage sandals.

== History ==
=== Blog ===
In June 2015, Plant created the Primitive Technology blog on WordPress. That blog was a primary source of his videos through November 2018 when he posted the "Iron Prills" video, whereupon Plant moved exclusively to YouTube.

=== YouTube channel ===
Plant created the Primitive Technology channel in May 2015. The first video was uploaded on 1 May 2015. Since that time, most of his videos have garnered millions of views. The channel amassed 5.4 million subscribers and 350 million views by September 2017, increasing to 8.7 million subscribers and 615 million views by September 2018. As of November 2026, the channel has over 11 million subscribers and over 1.24 billion views.

For the first two years of the channel's existence, the man in the videos remained anonymous. In June 2017, he identified himself as John Plant when he complained to Facebook that his videos were being stolen as a result of people reposting them on the website, and that the practice had cost him thousands of Australian dollars.

=== Book ===
Plant has authored the 192-page, illustrated, hardcover book entitled Primitive Technology: A survivalist's guide to building tools, shelters, and more in the wild (ISBN 9781984823670), published by Clarkson Potter on 29 October 2019. The book is "a practical guide to building huts and tools using only natural materials from the wild" containing "50 projects with step-by-step instructions on how to make tools, weapons, shelters, pottery, clothing, and more".

=== Hiatus and return to YouTube ===
After a video on 13 December 2019, no new videos were uploaded to Primitive Technology in the usual timeframe. On 28 May 2020, a post explaining the hiatus was posted to a Reddit community maintained by fans of the Primitive Technology channel. The post stated that Plant was taking a break from YouTube because he was working on a project for a cable network. Another post on 8 February 2021, explained that Plant shot a pilot episode for the project but the network wanted to change the format, and that Plant could not share any more information. In his free time, Plant was still recording new material, but he did not want to post it if he deemed it not high-enough quality. On 2 March 2022, Plant posted his first video in over two years, titled Primitive Technology: Thatched Workshop. He continues to upload videos monthly.
