= Bongo Cat =

2018 Internet meme

Bongo Cat

Bongo Cat is an Internet meme that originated when a Twitter user created and tweeted a GIF of a white cat-like blob smacking a table with its two paws. The tweet was then replied to by another Twitter user with an edited version of the GIF including bongos hit to the tune of a Super Mario World track. The reply went viral and caused the GIF to be edited to many other songs.

== History ==
The original Bongo Cat GIF originated on May 7, 2018, when an animated cat GIF made by Twitter user @StrayRogue was edited by @DitzyFlama, with the edit including bongos which were hit by the cat to the tune of "Athletic" from the Super Mario World soundtrack. The original artist clarified that Bongo Cat was a cat-like blob rather than an actual cat, showing a drawing of the character's full body in another tweet.

It has later been edited to many other songs and many different instruments in fan-made videos, appearing on social media such as YouTube and Twitter. The meme has covered many songs from video game soundtracks, such as music from Persona 5 and Super Mario, as well as mainstream songs such as Toto's "Africa" and Darude's "Sandstorm". After an increase in popularity, Stray Rogue began making and selling Bongo Cat merchandise. Bongo Cat also has been made into an interactive website.

The meme was also developed into key-mapping software in 2018. The program originated from open-source code written by Hamish Duncanson on GitHub, and was later modified by contributors such as MMmmmoko, ayangweb, and kuroni.

In 2023, Bongo Cat's cover of "What Was I Made For?" by Billie Eilish was shared online. The cover went viral on TikTok and fans sang this version during Eilish's concerts in 2024. By 2025, Filipino congressman Francisco "Kiko" Barzaga, representative of Dasmariñas City, became associated with the Bongo Cat cover as a part of his public persona, having branded himself "Congressmeow" on social media and doing cat-like gestures during interviews.

== Reception ==
Polygon and Uproxx both described Bongo Cat as the best meme of 2018. Ellen Scott of Metro also described Bongo Cat as bringing "happiness to all, even in the trashfire [sic] year that was 2018". The Daily Dot described it as the most earnest and wholesome meme of 2018. Reid McCarter of The A.V. Club and Megan Farokhmanesh of The Verge both praised the meme. Nicole Clark of Vice described the meme as "the only good thing on the internet."

Praised for its flexibility, Bongo Cat has also been compared to the keyboard cat meme.
