= Nutticha Namwong =

Thai YouTuber and actress (born 1996)

Kaykai Salaider
- เก๋ไก๋ สไลเดอร์
- Born: Nutticha Namwong; 5 September 1996 (age 30); Bangkok, Thailand
- Other name: Kaykai Salaider
- Occupations: YouTuber; actress; singer
- Agent: Channel 3 HD (2023–present)

YouTube information
- Channel: Kaykai Salaider
- Years active: 2016–present
- Genres: vlog; comedy
- Subscribers: 17.2 million
- Views: 4.73 billion
- Last updated: 4 August 2026

Nutticha Namwong (Thai: ณัฐธิชา นามวงษ์) (born 5 September 1996) or stage name Kaykai Salaider, is a Thai YouTuber. Her YouTube channel currently has 16.4 million subscribers. She became the first Thai YouTuber to hit over 16 million subscribers.

== Early life ==
She was born on 5 September 1996 in Bangkok. She finished secondary school at Ruettiya Wannarai School. She is currently studying at Bangkok University.

== Career ==
She started being a YouTuber in 2016, by uploading her first clip "Plod Nee Hai Khun Mae" (in English: Paying Off Mother's Debt).

She also starred in the film Senior and had a role in the Season 3 of Thai series Hormones. In 2023, Nutthicha signed a contract to become an actor under Channel 3 HD. She debuted in the drama "Kor Rak Mun Pak Jai" from Chollumpee Brothers, opposite Kongthap Peak.
