= Bilingirl =

Japanese YouTuber

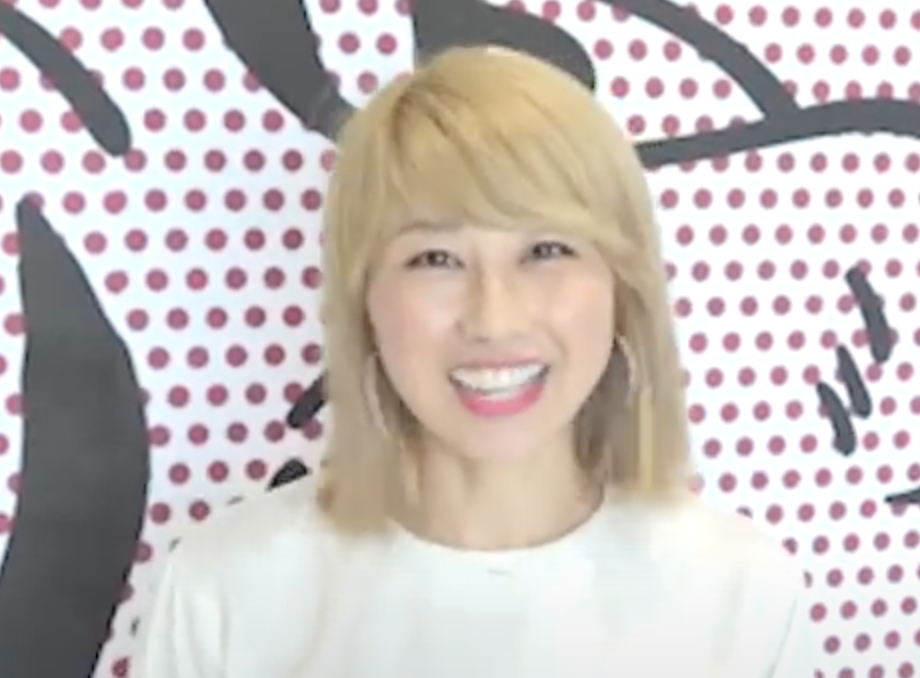
- Yoshida in 2019
- Born: Chika Yoshida (吉田 千佳, Yoshida Chika); December 31, 1984 (age 41); Nagasaki Prefecture, Japan
- Other name: Bilingirl
- Occupation: YouTuber

YouTube information
- Years active: 2011–present
- Genres: Educational; vlogging
- Subscribers: 1.58 million
- Views: 554 million
- Last updated: June 21, 2026
- Website: www.bilingirl-chika.com

Chika Yoshida (吉田 ちか, Yoshida Chika; born December 31, 1984), also known as Bilingirl (バイリンガール) or Bilingirl Chika, is a Japanese YouTuber. Since 2011, Yoshida has been producing videos on YouTube where she gives casual English lessons to Japanese people. As of 2026, she has 1.58 million subscribers on her YouTube channel.

== Early life ==
Born in Nagasaki Prefecture, Japan, Yoshida moved to the United States when she was in her first year of elementary school due to her father's job transfer, and she grew up in Anacortes, Washington. She attended a Japanese school every week from elementary to high school, where she was classmates with actor Kei Hosogai. After graduating from high school, Yoshida enrolled at the University of Washington in 2003, where she majored in business and attended the Foster School of Business, and she graduated in 2007. After spending 16 years in the United States, she moved back to Japan, where she worked as a business consultant for an American company at their Japanese branch. From 2010 to 2012, she briefly opened a nail salon in Ginza as a side business.

== Career ==
In 2011, Yoshida posted her first video on her YouTube channel, Bilingirl English Conversation (バイリンガール英会話) to teach English grammar to her friend, who had asked her to look over her English resume. After posting more English lessons, her channel began attracting a following, and after 1.5 years, she decided to focus on her YouTube career full-time after receiving job inquiries from several companies. Several clients that Yoshida has worked with include Austrian Airlines and Kao Corporation. Since opening her channel, Yoshida has gained 1.5 million subscribers as of 2021.

In 2014, Yoshida opened a second YouTube channel, Japanagos, which features educational videos about Japan to her overseas viewers. In the same year, she appeared in a commercial for YouTube.

In 2018, NHK broadcast a television program that named Yoshida as the 5th favorite YouTuber in Japan. In the same year, she launched a mobile app called "Help Me Travel", which teaches English phrases to Japanese people when traveling abroad.

In April 2020, Yoshida took a hiatus from her channel following criticisms of her decision to return to Japan from Malaysia at the height of the COVID-19 pandemic. She resumed posting videos on August 13, 2020.

== Personal life ==
On October 18, 2015, Yoshida announced that she was getting married. In June 2018, she gave birth to a daughter, nicknamed Pudding (プリン, Purin). On October 19, 2021, she announced that she had given birth to a son, nicknamed Clover (クローバー, Kurōbā).

== Publications ==
Year	Title	Publisher	ISBN
2015	Native Eigo Nante Hitsuyō Nai! Phrase Bakari Anki Shitemo, Anata ga Eigo o Hanasenai Wake (ネイティブ英語なんて必要ない! フレーズばかり暗記しても、あなたが英語を話せないワケ)	Kadokawa Magazines	ISBN 978-4047317109
2015	YouTube to Manga de So Much Fun! Bilingirl Eikawa (YouTubeとマンガでso much fun! バイリンガール英会話)	Media Factory	ISBN 978-4040676302
2018	Jinsei de Ichido wa Yattemitai America Ōdan no Tabi (人生で一度はやってみたいアメリカ横断の旅)	Jitsugyo no Nihon Sha	ISBN 978-4408420820
2018	Help Me Travel: Tabi ga Hyaku-bai Tanoshiku Naru Eikawa (HELP me TRAVEL 旅が100倍楽しくなる英会話)	Jitsugyo no Nihon Sha	ISBN 978-4408338149
2019	Wake Up! In Melbourne (WAKE UP! in メルボルン)	Sekai Bunka Publishing	ISBN 978-4418195046
2022	Wake Up! In Kuala Lumpur (ＷＡＫＥ ＵＰ ！ ｉｎ クアラルンプ−ル)	Sekai Bunka Publishing	ISBN 978-4418205028
