= The High Fructose Adventures of Annoying Orange =

American television series

- Genre: Comedy; Slapstick; Adventure
- Created by: Tom Sheppard; Dane Boedigheimer
- Based on: Annoying Orange by Dane Boedighiemer
- Starring: Toby Turner
- Voices of: Dane Boedigheimer; Justine Ezarik; Bob Jennings; Harland Williams; Kevin Brueck; Felicia Day; Tom Kenny
- Theme music composer: Sabrina Abu-Obeid; DJ Monopoli
- Opening theme: "He's Orange!", (written by Dane Boedigheimer; remixed version by Sabrina Abu-Obeid and DJ Monopoli; performed by Terabrite)
- Composers: Randall Crissman; Shawn Patterson
- Country of origin: United States
- Original language: English
- No. of seasons: 2
- No. of episodes: 60 (list of episodes)

Production
- Executive producers: Gary Binkow; Dane Boedigheimer; Tom Sheppard; Conrad Vernon; Dan Weinstein; Michael Green
- Producer: Margot McDonough
- Cinematography: Jon Tucker; E. Gustavo Petersen
- Editors: Stephen Adrianson; Lee Mansis; Matt Sklar; Joe Vallero
- Running time: 11 minutes
- Production companies: Annoying Orange, Inc.; The Collective; 14th Hour Productions

Original release
- Network: Cartoon Network
- Release: May 28, 2012 – March 17, 2014

The High Fructose Adventures of Annoying Orange, or simply Annoying Orange HFA, is an American live-action animated comedy television series created by Dane Boedigheimer and Tom Sheppard for Cartoon Network. Based on the characters from Boedigheimer's web series Annoying Orange, created by her (Note: Boedigheimer is transgender and uses she/her and they/them pronouns.) and Spencer Grove, it was produced by Annoying Orange, Inc., The Collective, and 14th Hour Productions. A preview aired on May 28, 2012, and the official premiere was on June 11, 2012. The show ended on March 17, 2014, with 2 seasons and 60 episodes, with a total of thirty episodes per season.

The series also featured many well-known guest stars such as Mark Hamill, Slash, Kendall Jenner, Carly Rae Jepsen, Carlos Alazraqui, Jim Belushi, Matt Bomer, "Weird Al" Yankovic, Rainn Wilson, Seth Green, George Takei, among others.

== Plot ==
The show follows the lives of Annoying Orange and his friends: the sarcastic Pear, the sassy Passion Fruit, the tiny Midget Apple, the eccentric Marshmallow, the unlucky Apple, the elderly Grandpa Lemon, and the egocentric Grapefruit. The show diverges from the YouTube series in that they reside at a fruit stand in Dane Boe's, a supermarket (Note: The name is a reference to the creator of the same name.) rather than in a kitchen. Nerville (played by internet personality Toby Turner), a new addition to the cast, runs the supermarket (mainly as a janitor) and is the only human who can talk to the fruits.

== Episodes ==
Season	Episodes	Originally released	
Season	Episodes	First released	Last released
1	30	May 28, 2012	March 28, 2013
2	30	May 16, 2013	March 17, 2014

== Characters ==
=== Primary ===
- Orange (voiced by Dane Boedigheimer) is the main protagonist of the series. Much like his web counterpart, Orange is annoying, obnoxious, and partial to terrible puns, but deep down always means well, even though his quirks often drag his friends into ridiculous adventures. The series shows another side of Orange that differs from his YouTube persona and casts him as a wacky hero.
- Pear (voiced by Dane Boedigheimer) is Orange's best friend, often serving as the sole voice-of-reason in the fruit stand (though he usually goes ignored).
- Passion Fruit (voiced by Justine Ezarik) – Often referred to as "Passion", she is adorable, pragmatic, and smart. She has a crush on Orange, unlike the web series where the roles are reversed, to which Orange is completely oblivious, even though everyone else sees how obvious it is.
- Midget Apple/Little Apple (voiced by Dane Boedigheimer) is a grumpy small apple with a scrappy demeanor. He prefers to be called "Little Apple", and a running gag is that he will correct anyone who calls him "Midget Apple", which he hates being called.
- Marshmallow (voiced by Dane Boedigheimer) is a cute, eternally upbeat, and cheerful marshmallow.
- Grapefruit (voiced by Bob Jennings) is a hulking man-boy and prideful narcissist with an ego problem who thinks of himself as "large and in charge" and often brags about things he's yet to accomplish. He believes he is in a rivalry with Orange for Passion Fruit's affections, but she has no interest in him.
- Apple (voiced by Harland Williams) is an insecure and critical pessimist who rarely joins Orange's adventures for fear he will get bruised, though he usually ends up even worse off by staying behind. There is a running gag where Apple gets killed and/or maimed in every episode, similar to Kenny McCormick from the first five seasons of South Park.
- Grandpa Lemon (voiced by Kevin Brueck) is the befuddled, elder statesman of the fruit stand. He thinks he is everybody's grandpa and has a habit of falling asleep mid-sentence.
- Nerville (played by Toby Turner) is an employee at Daneboe's Fruit Store, where he lives, and is the only human who can talk to the fruits (as other humans dismiss it as insanity). He is a close friend to the fruits.

=== Secondary ===
- Coconut (voiced by Tom Kenny) – Good-natured, but dim and hard-headed, Coconut is an occasional member of the gang, serving as the muscle when he does join.
- Peach (voiced by Felicia Day) is another member of the Fruit Gang, a peach who normally makes cameos.
- Broccoli Alien Overlord (voiced by Rob Paulsen) is an evil alien piece of broccoli, who speaks with an English accent, and serves as the main antagonist of the series. He is bent on enslaving Earth and becoming superior to fruit, though later his goals seem to be focused solely on destroying the Fruit Cart.
- Guava (voiced by Tom Kenny) is a member of the Fruit Gang who got women's legs after dreaming about them.
- Ginger (voiced by Felicia Day) is an organic ginger root who has a crush on Pear.
- Elderly Banana (voiced by Tom Sheppard) is an elderly, ripe banana with a passion for the macabre and scary when within the Fruit Gang.
- Big Rock Candy Monster (voiced by John DiMaggio) is a monster made entirely of rock candy and a native of the planet Marshmalia. Upset because marshmallows took their place in desserts, he swore revenge against them. After his initial appearance, he becomes a reoccurring character. He has also appeared in the Annoying Orange YouTube channel in a Gangnam Style parody video.

=== Special guest stars ===
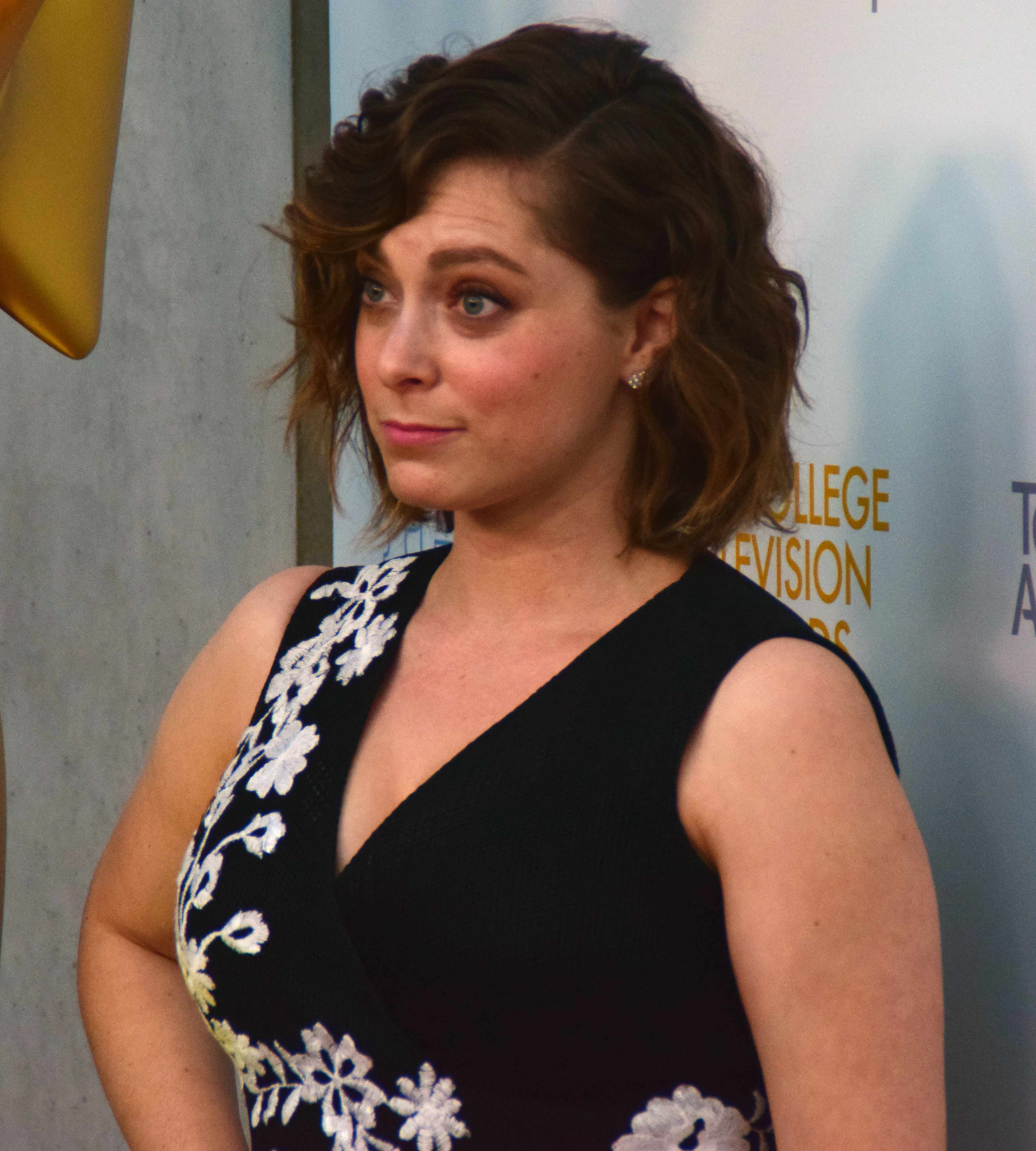

- Rachel Bloom as Chick Pea Singer, Breakfast Pastry
- Dane Boedigheimer as Trapper, Kingpin, Security Officers, Neighborhood Watch Posse, Tennis Ball, Fruit, Apple, Orange on tree, Mrs. Orange, Pauly Dingdang, Lettuce, Palace Gourd, Vegetables, Pumpkins

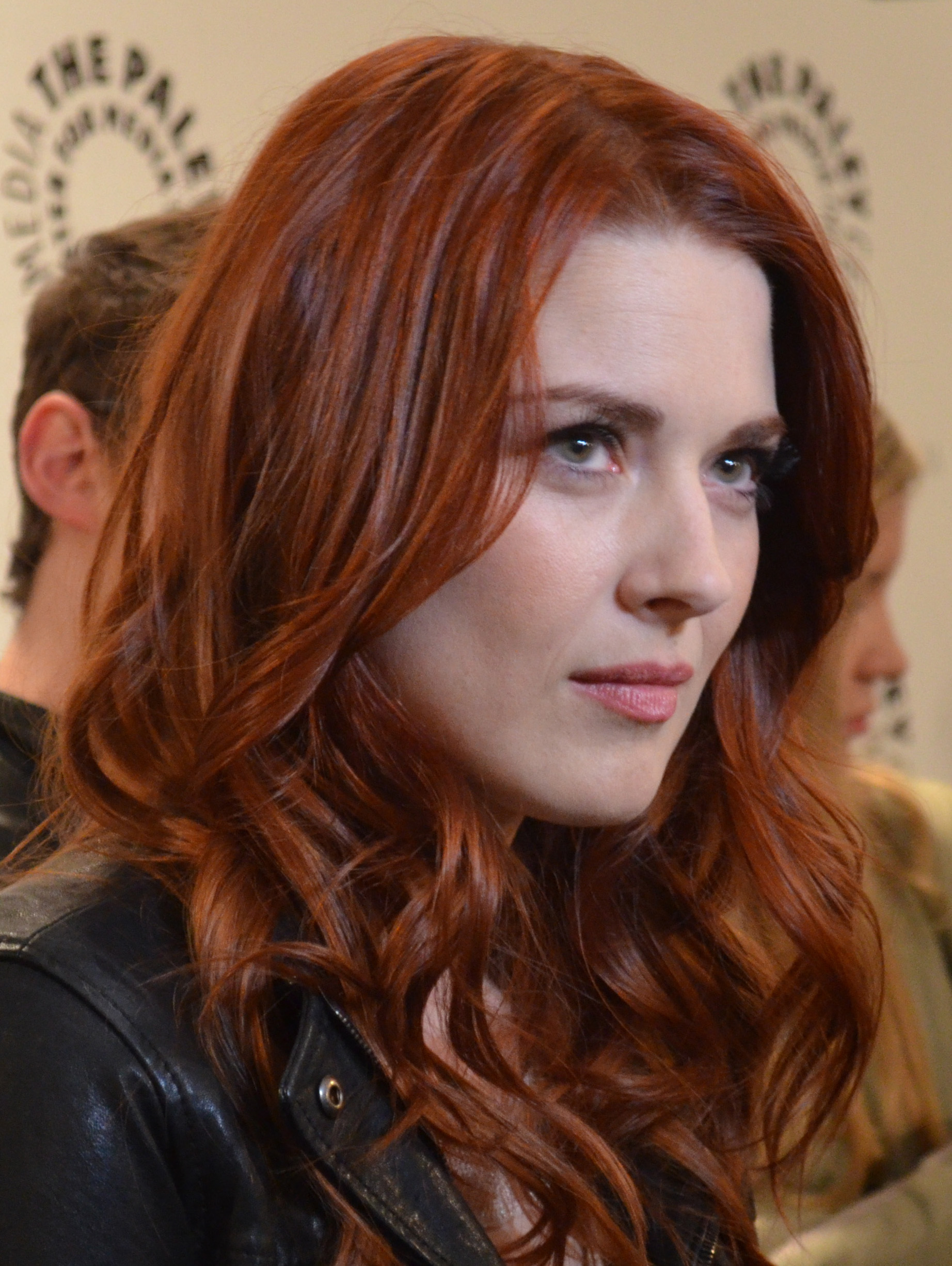

- Alexandra Breckenridge as Apple Singer
- Kevin Brueck as Kingpin, Milk Bottle, Baby Kumquat, Neighborhood Watch Posse, Seagull, Apple Trebek, the Bries Member #1
- Susan Carlson as Orange Costume Performer

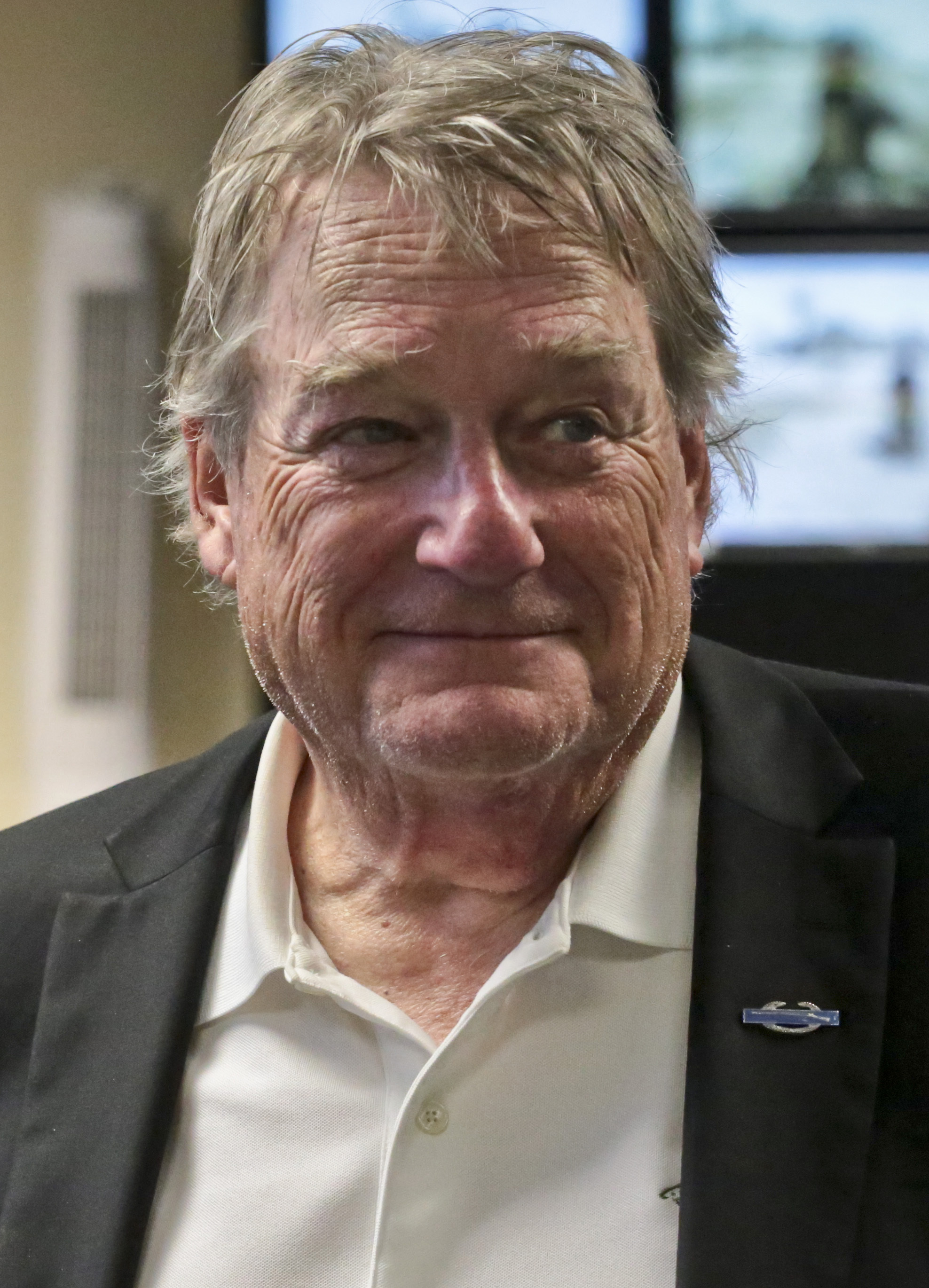

- Blake Clark as Sheriff Cantaloupe, Aspara-Gus

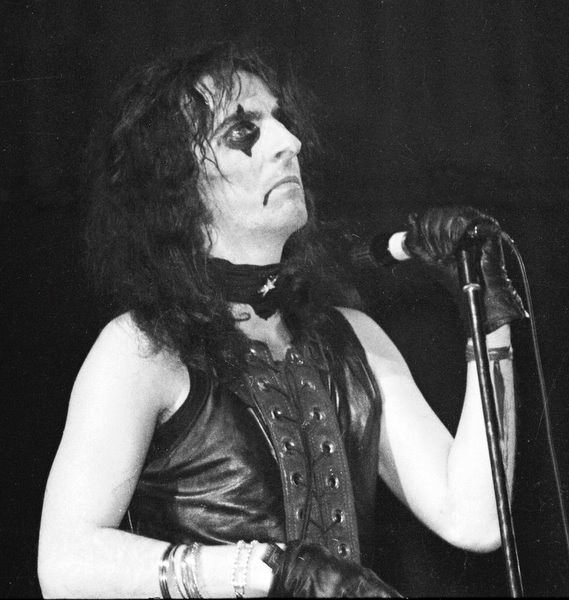

- Alice Cooper as Himself

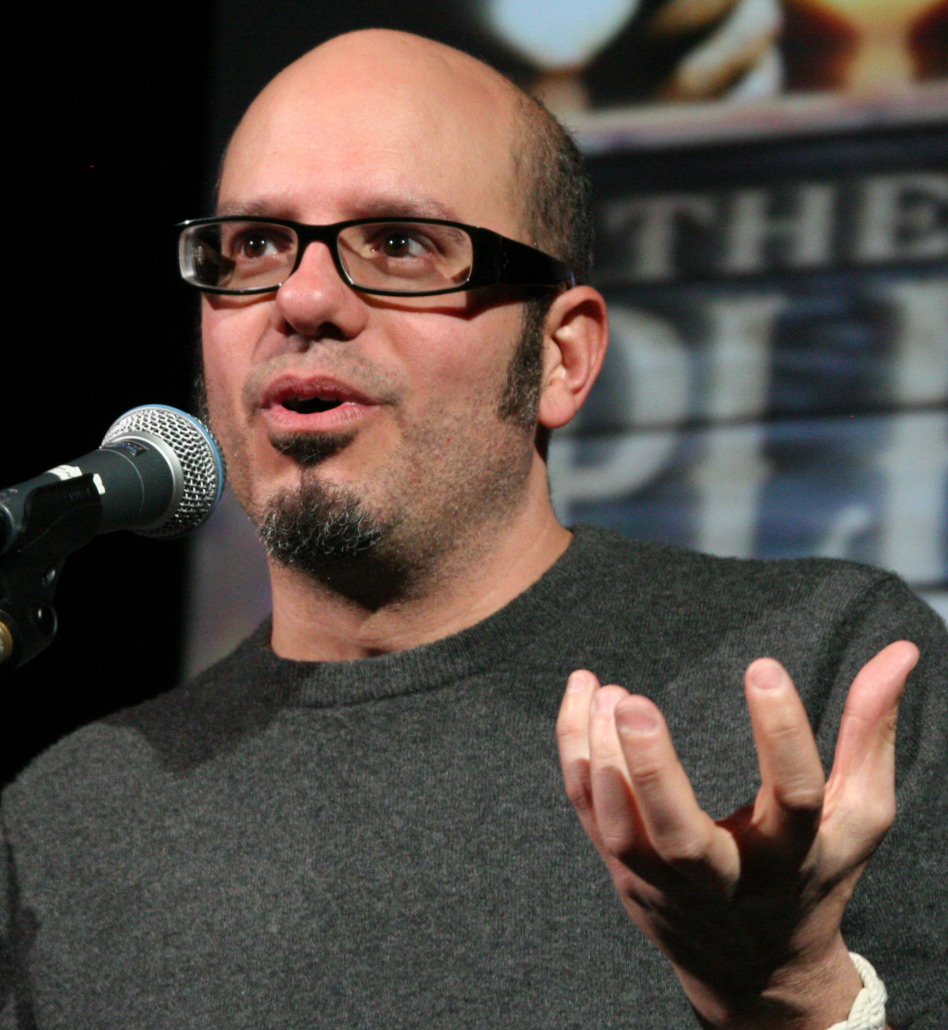

- David Cross as Shakesparagus Speare
- Cuddles as Herself

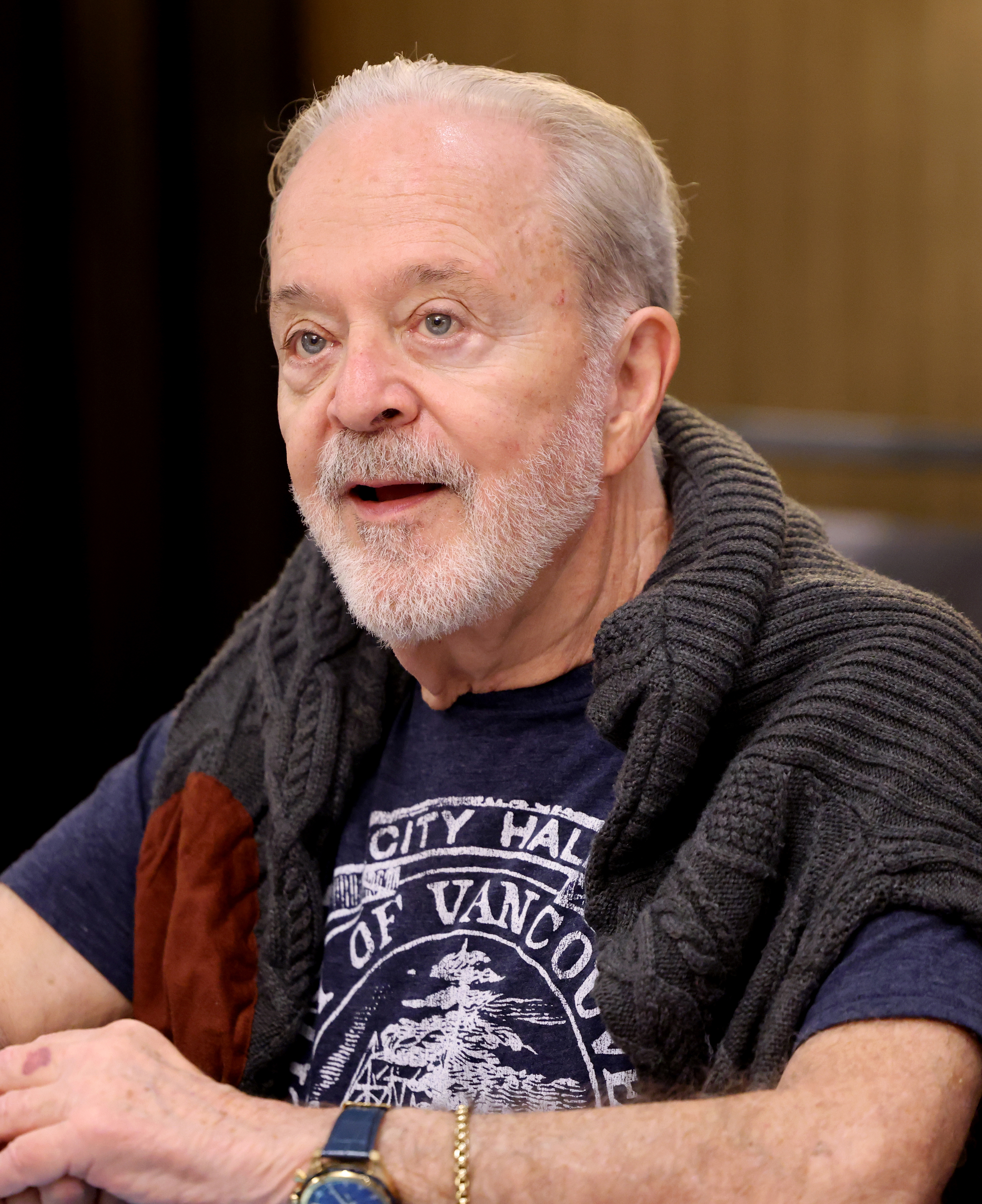

- Jim Cummings as Rotten Tomato, Pineapple, Tennis Ball, Tomato, the Bries Member #2 and the Market Grandmaster

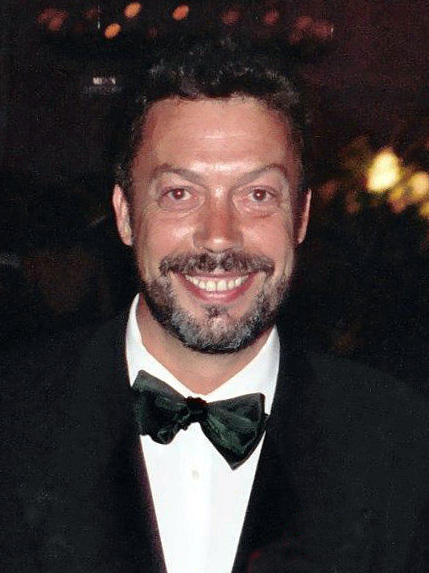

- Tim Curry as Arugula, Endive, Professor Plum

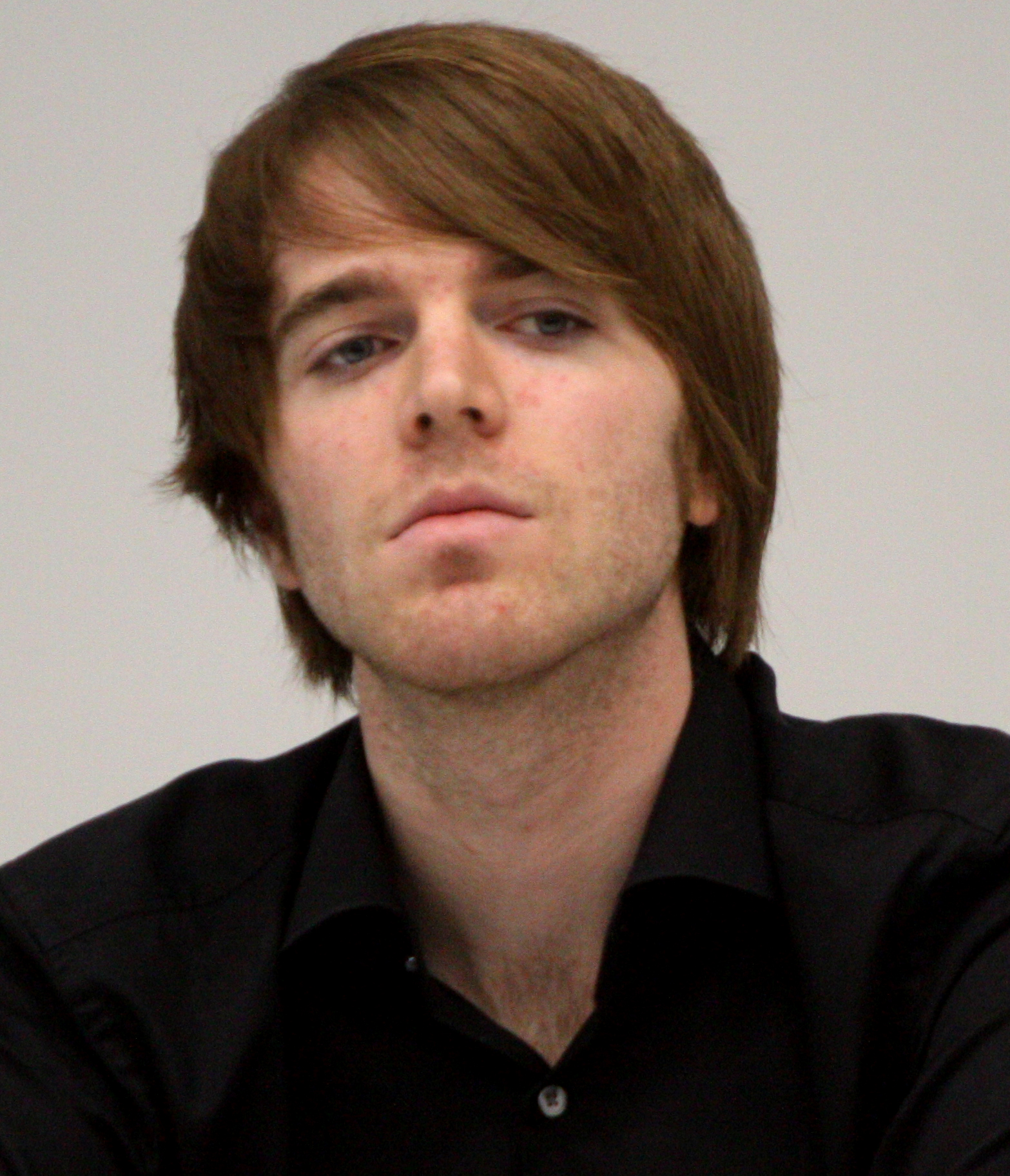

- Shane Dawson as Popcorn, Kevin Bacon

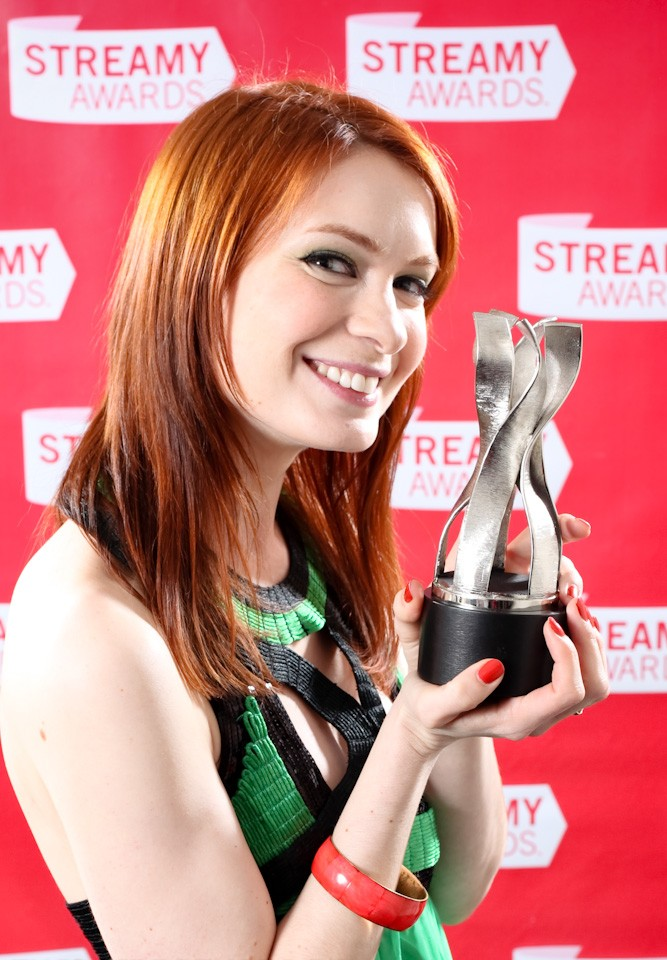

- Felicia Day as Marshmallow, Daneboe's Customer, Zucchini Actress, Starrie, Chick Pea Singer

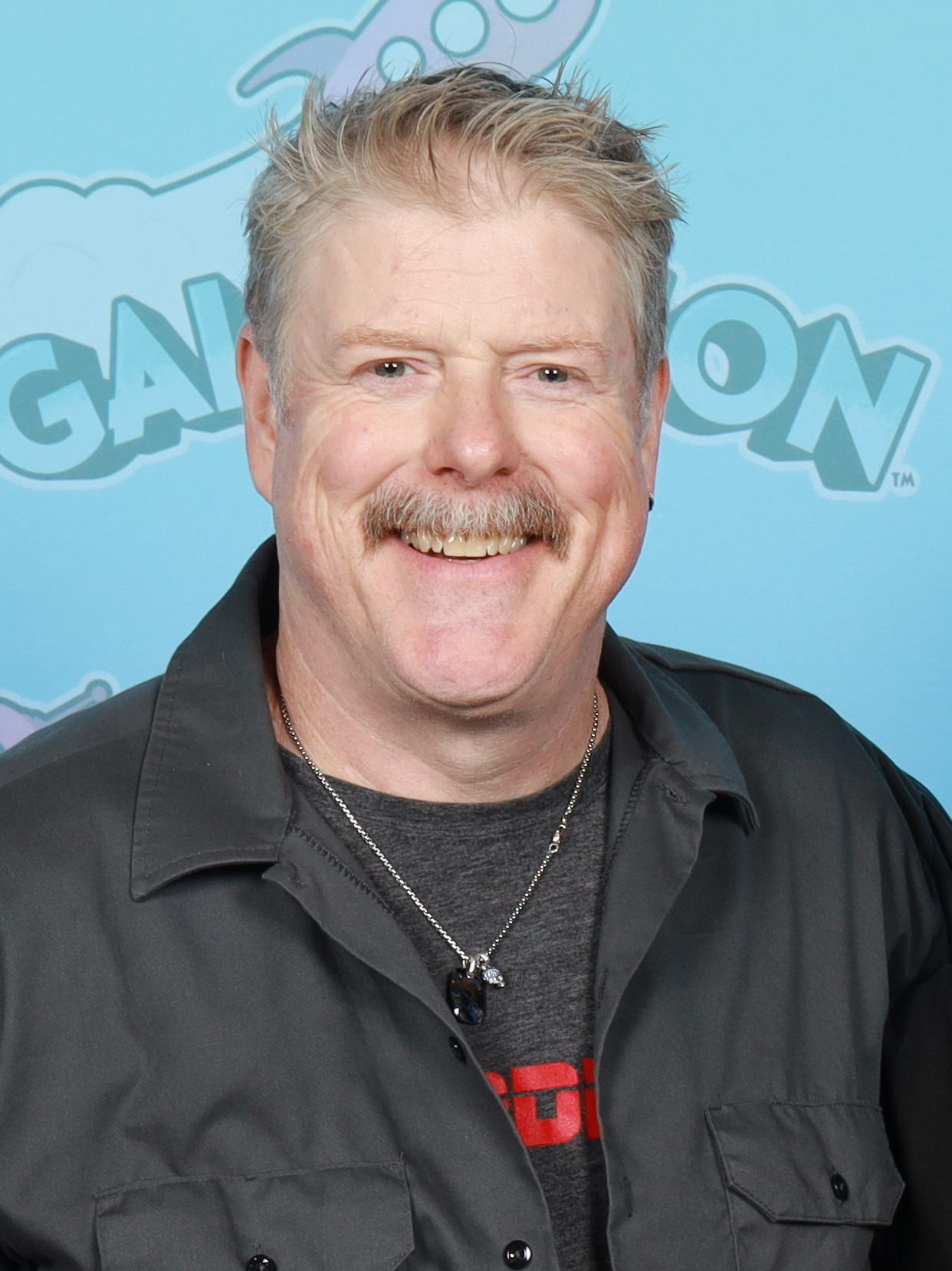

- John DiMaggio as Leader of the Squashies, Sweet Cookie, Tumble Weed, Mango

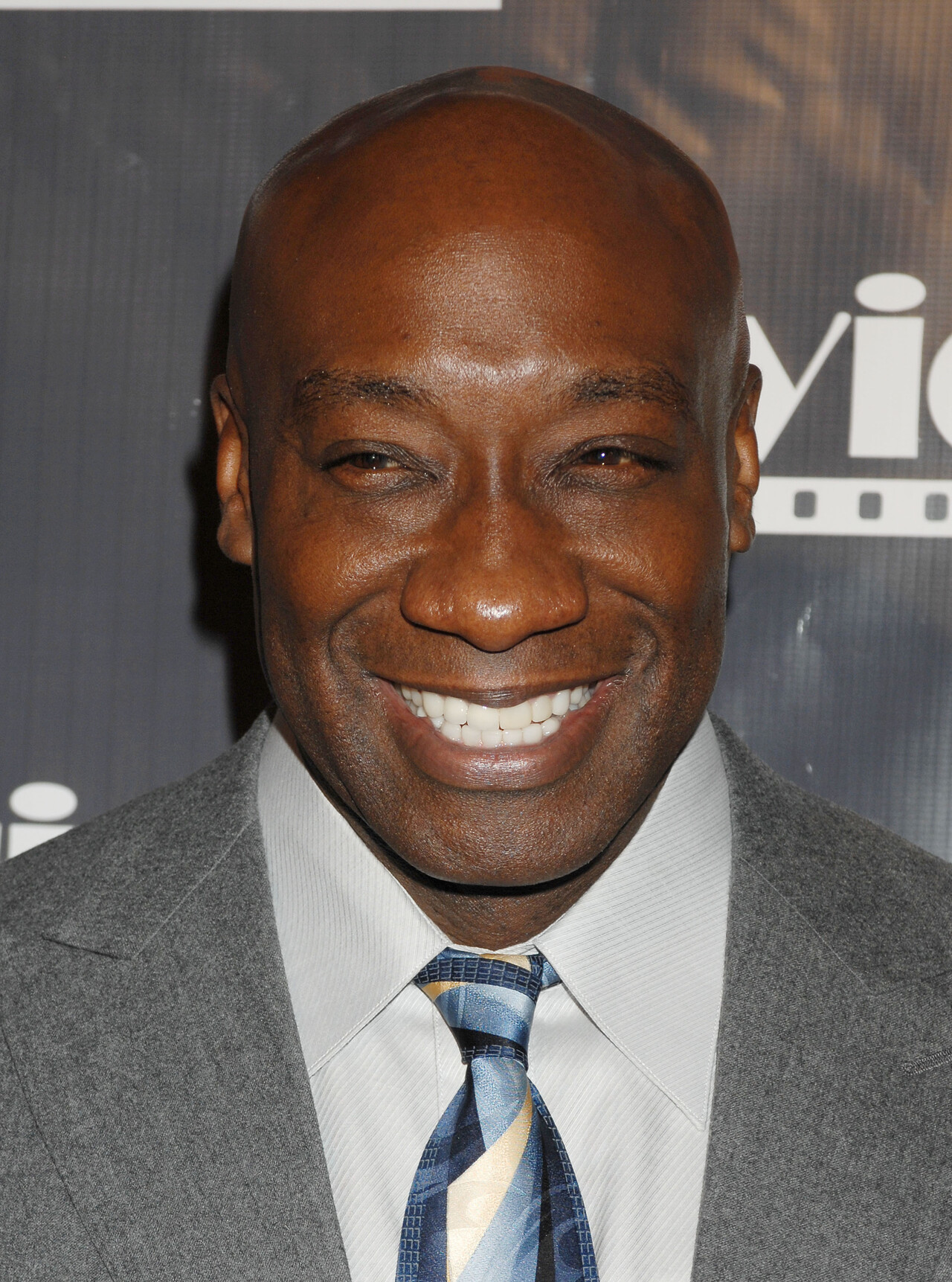

- Michael Clarke Duncan as King Marshmallow: Marshmallow's Father, Chunkee Cheeses

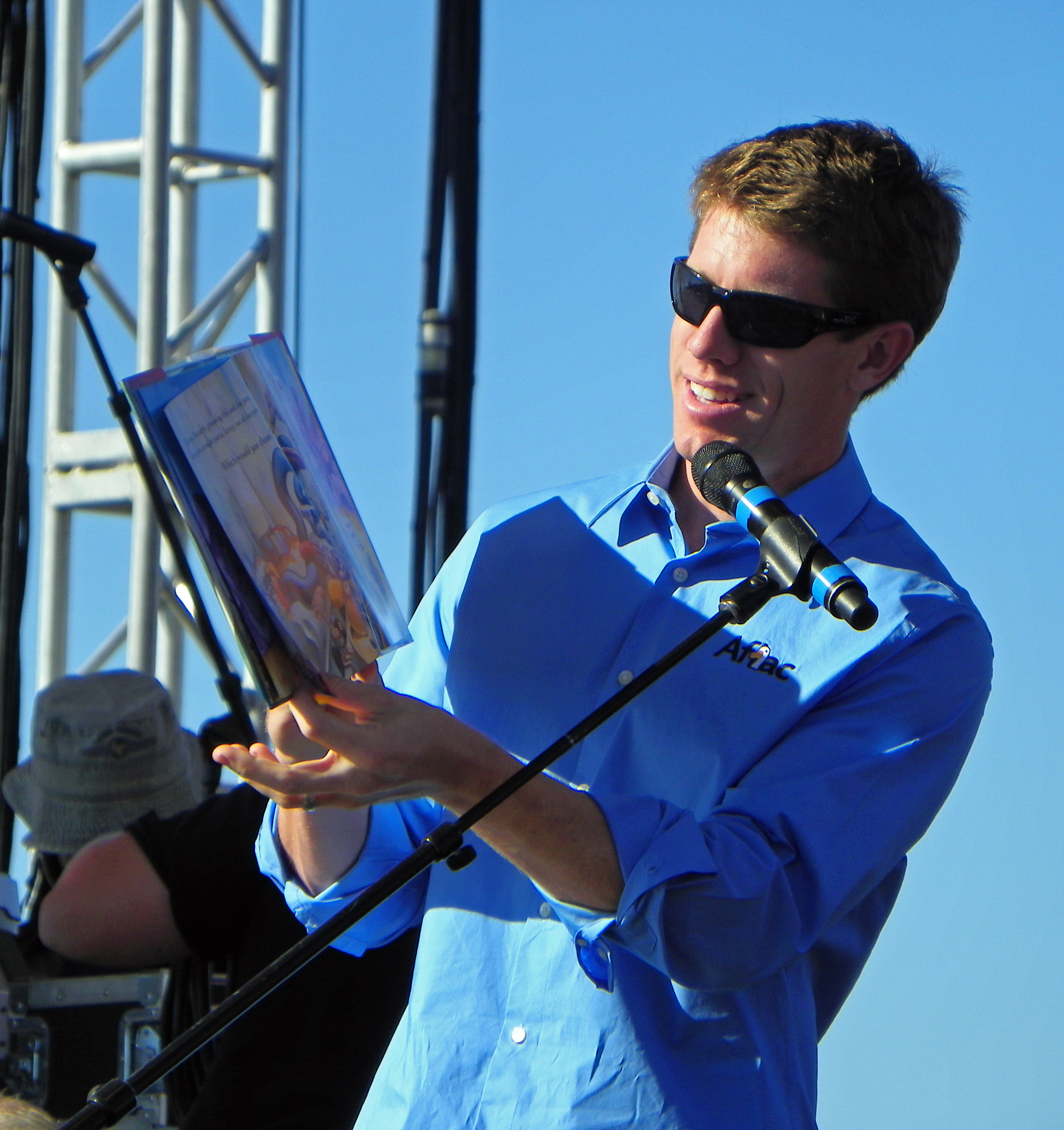

- Carl Edwards as Sandwich Cherr-iot Driver
- Justine Ezarik as Onion, Grapes, Saguaro Cactus, Carrot, Milk Carton, Broom, Beet

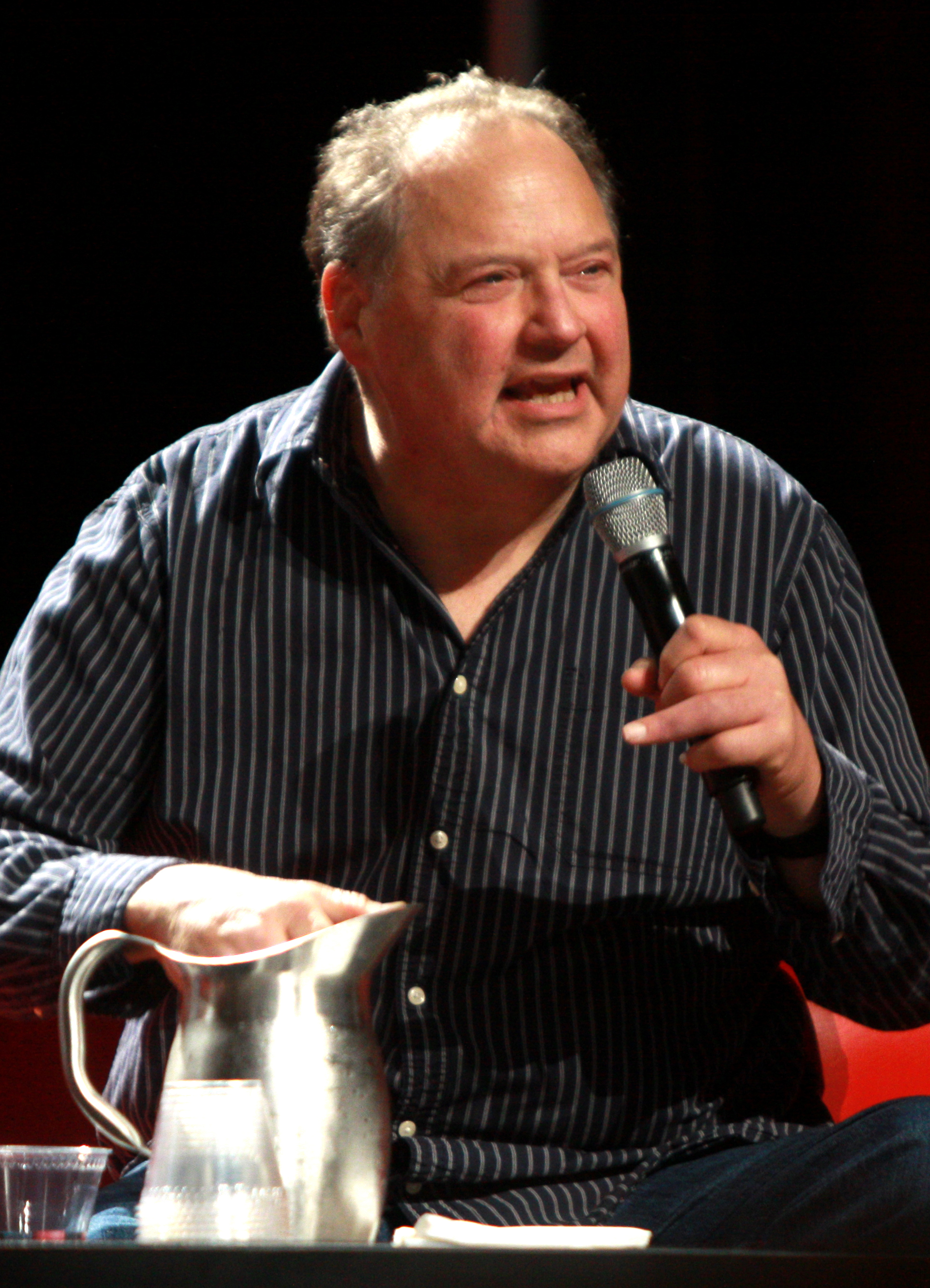

- Stephen Furst

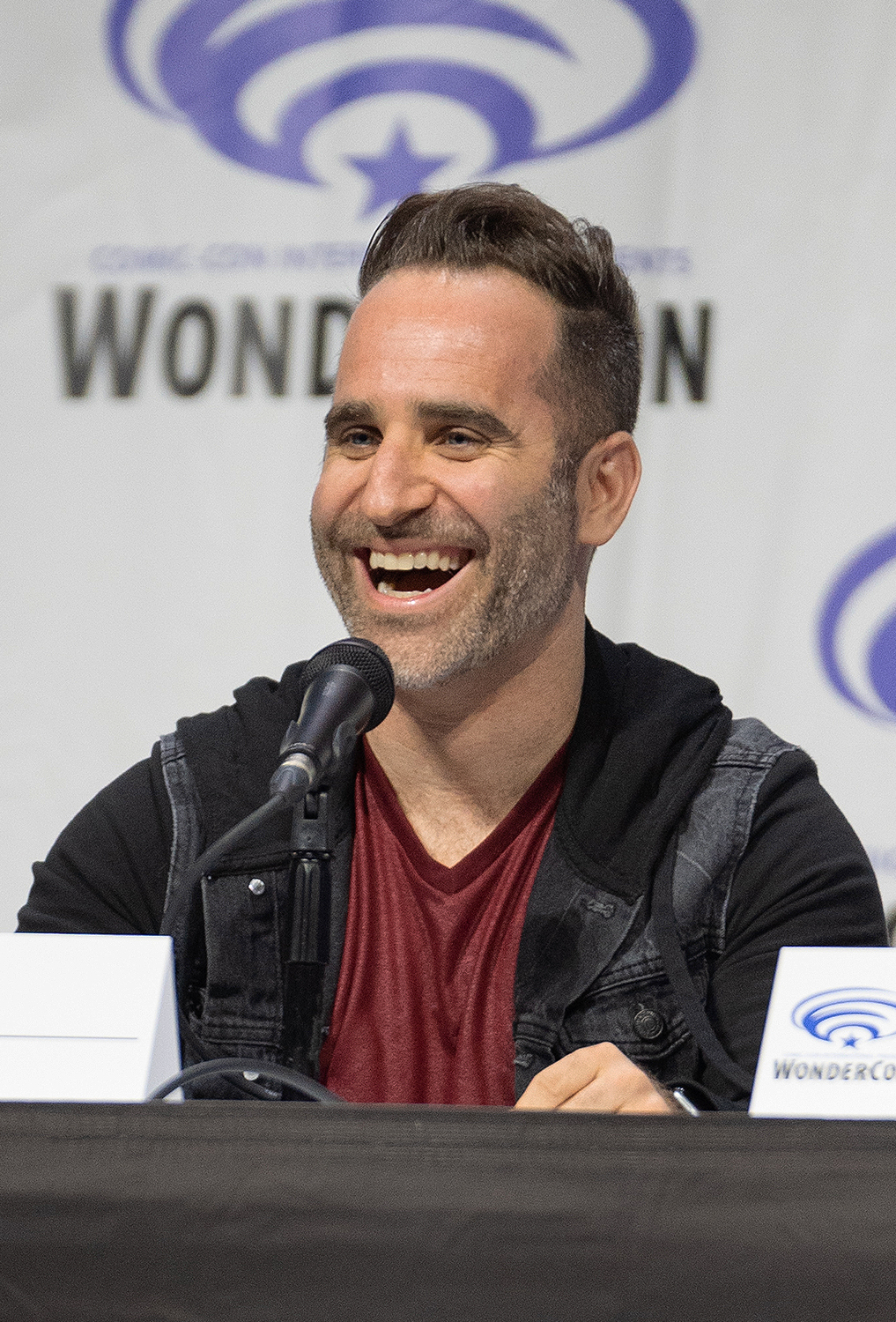

- Ben Giroux as the Ugly Princess of the Realm

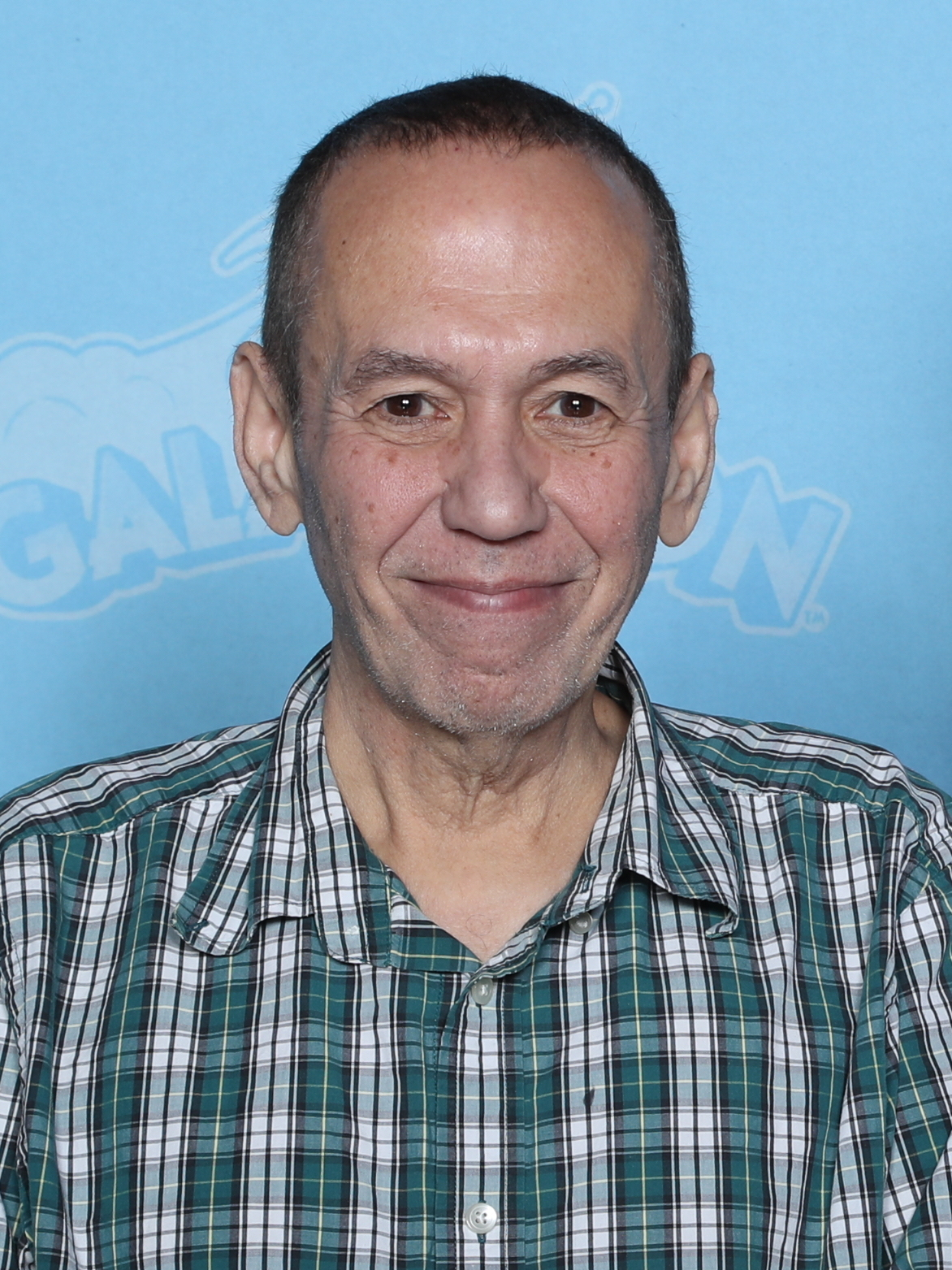

- Gilbert Gottfried as Alfalfa, Chief Pumpkin

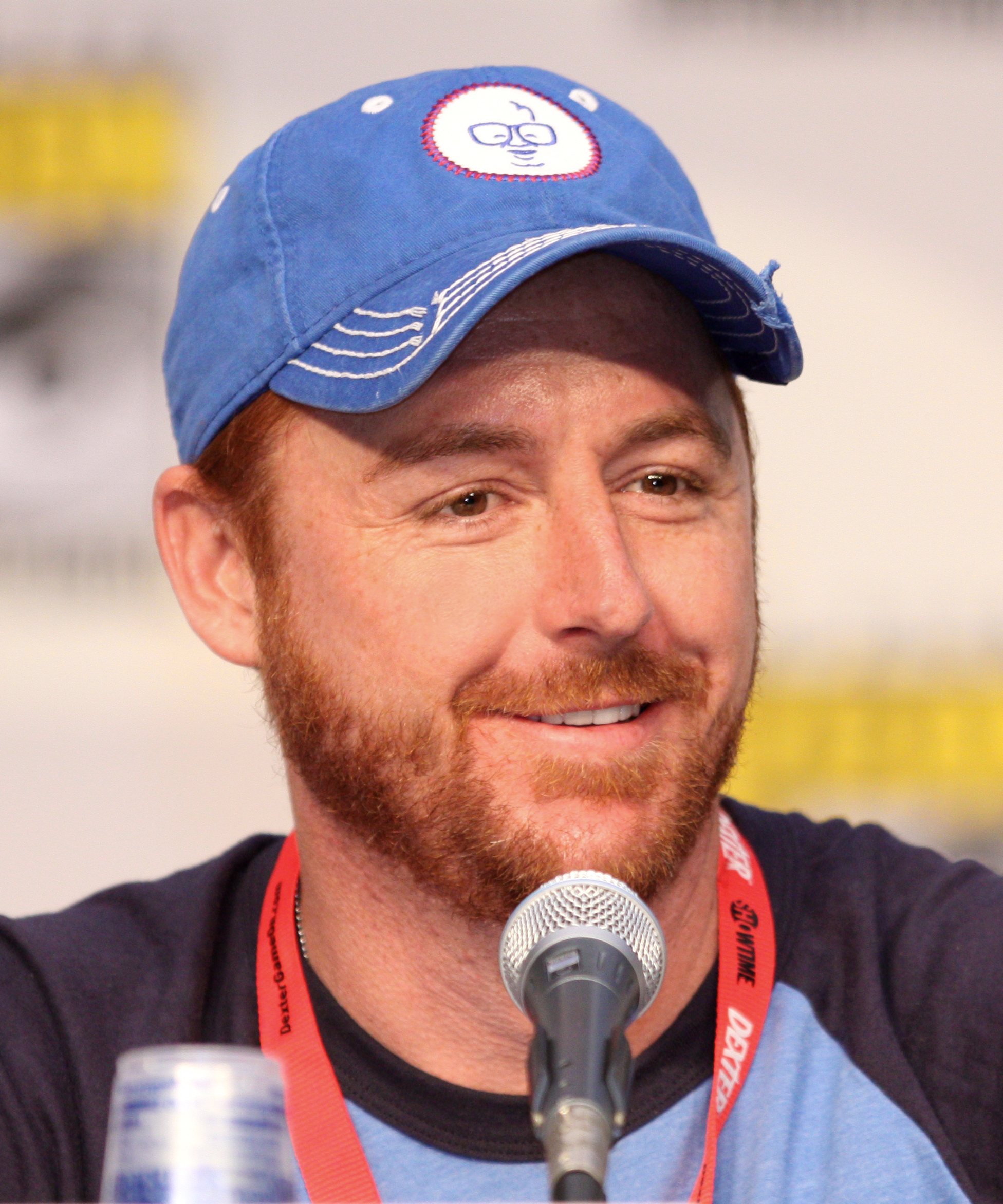

- Scott Grimes as Dr. Cauliflower

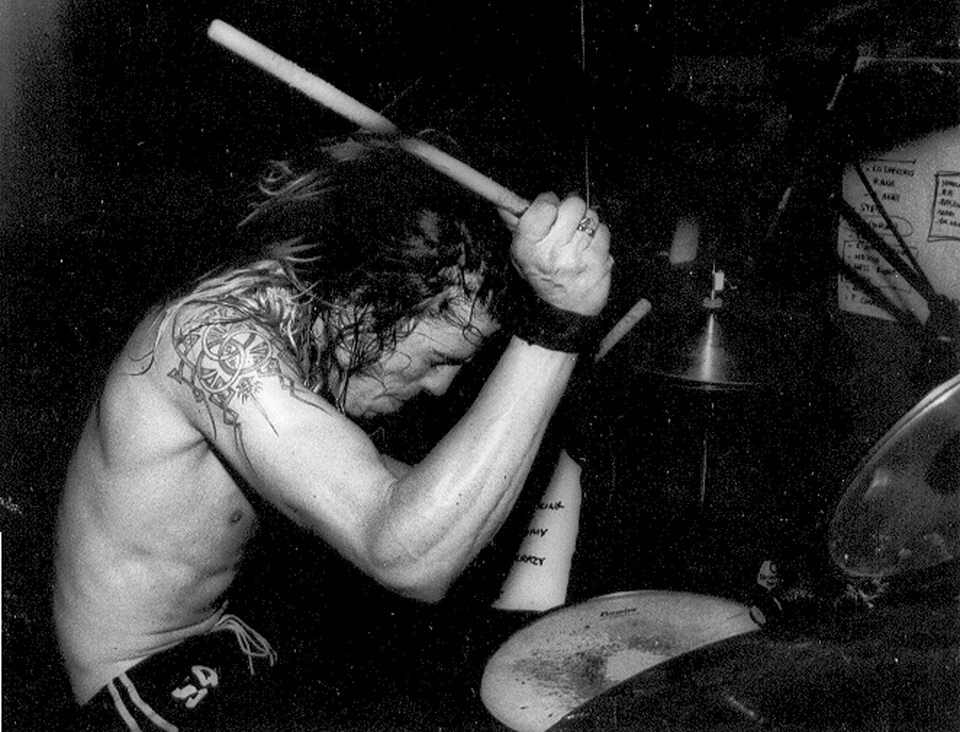

- Dave Grohl as Himself, Mayor Chipwich, Venus Fruit Plant

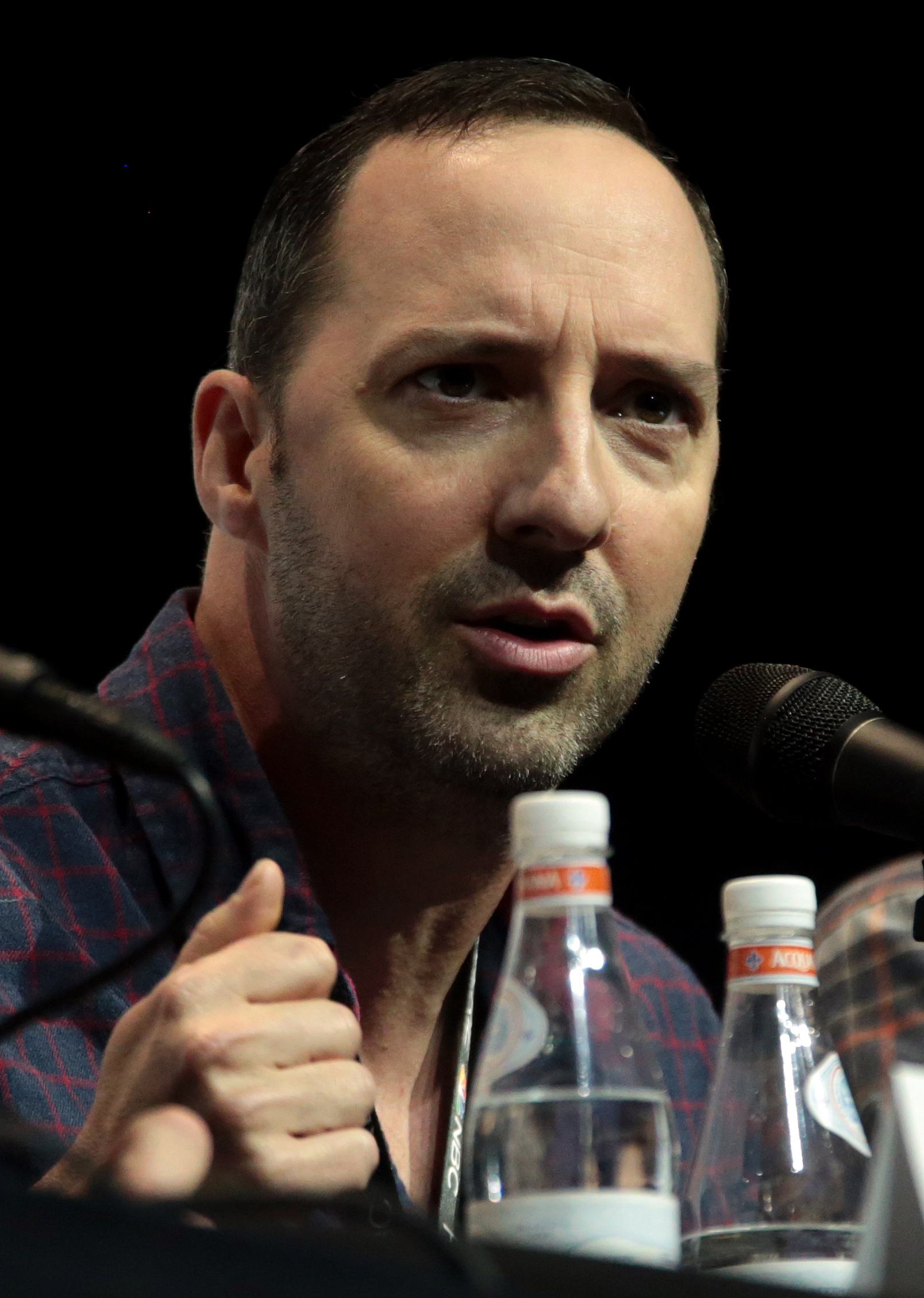

- Tony Hale as Caesar

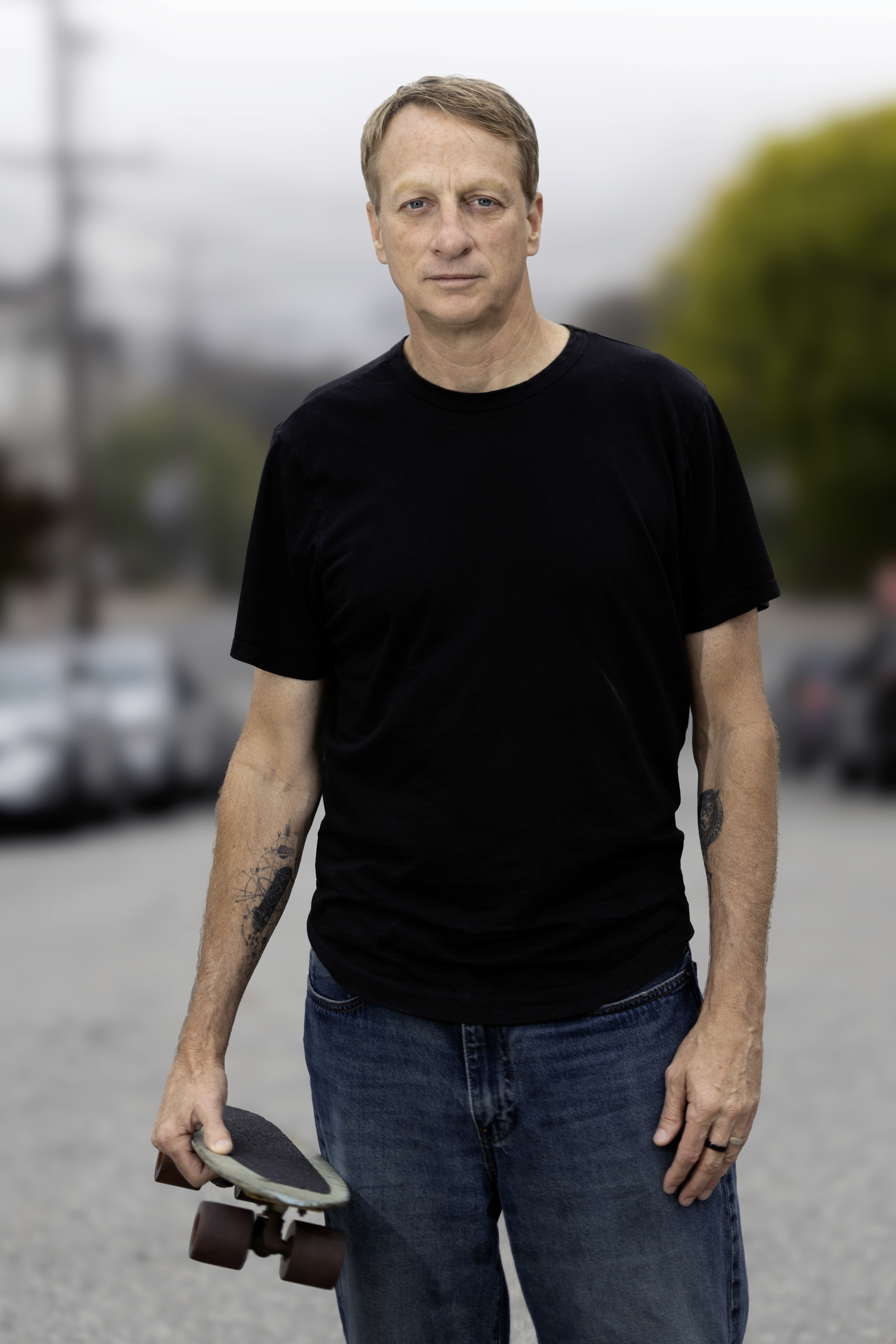

- Tony Hawk as Ripe Rind

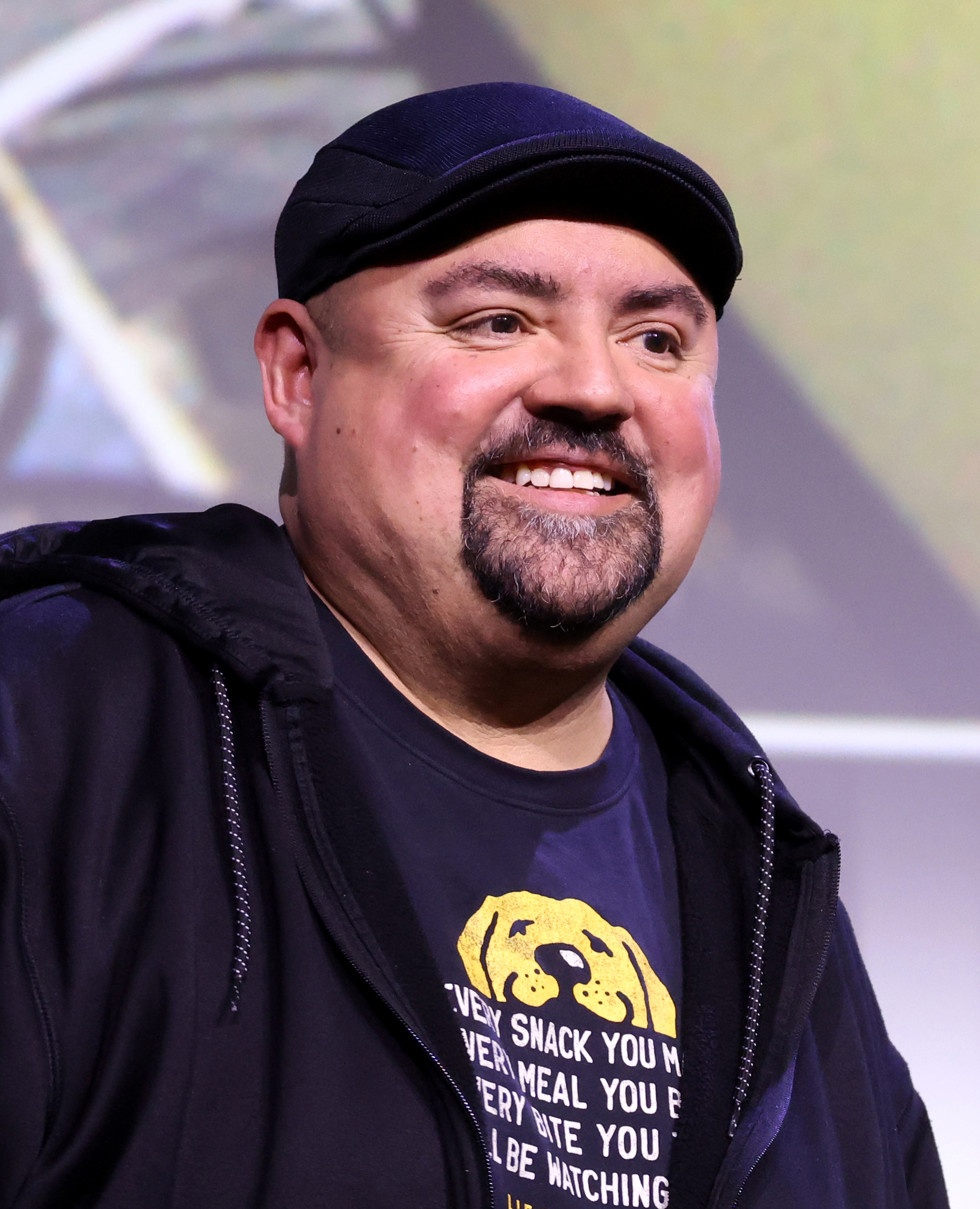

- Gabriel Iglesias as Mr. Juicy Fun, Mr. Cash, Smash, Crazy Klaus

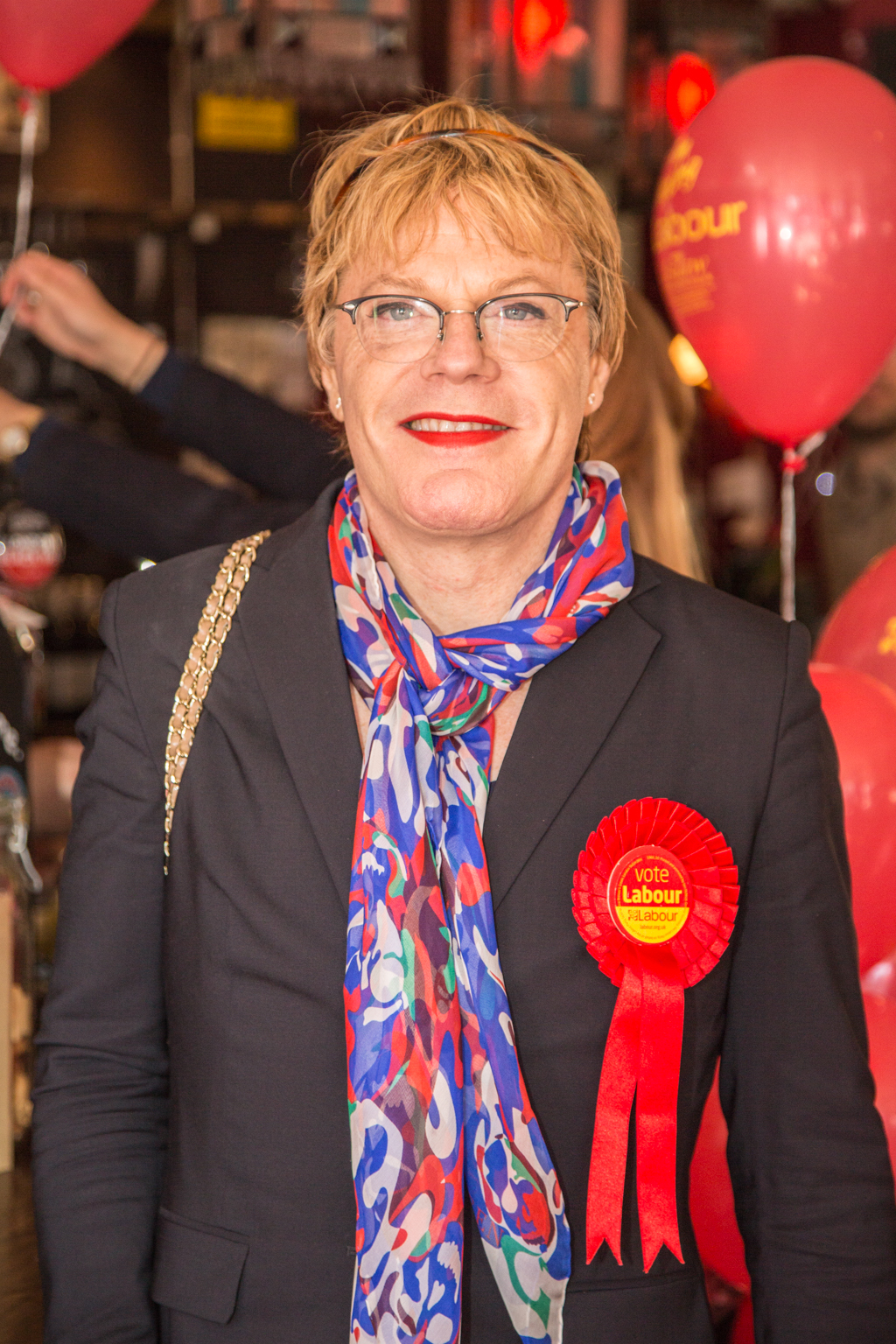

- Eddie Izzard as Sean the Leprechaun King

- Kendall Jenner as Strawberry
- Bob Jennings as Zucchini, Kingpin, Milk Bottle, Neighborhood Watch Posse, Stomach Shark, Grapes, Tumblewood, Kiwi

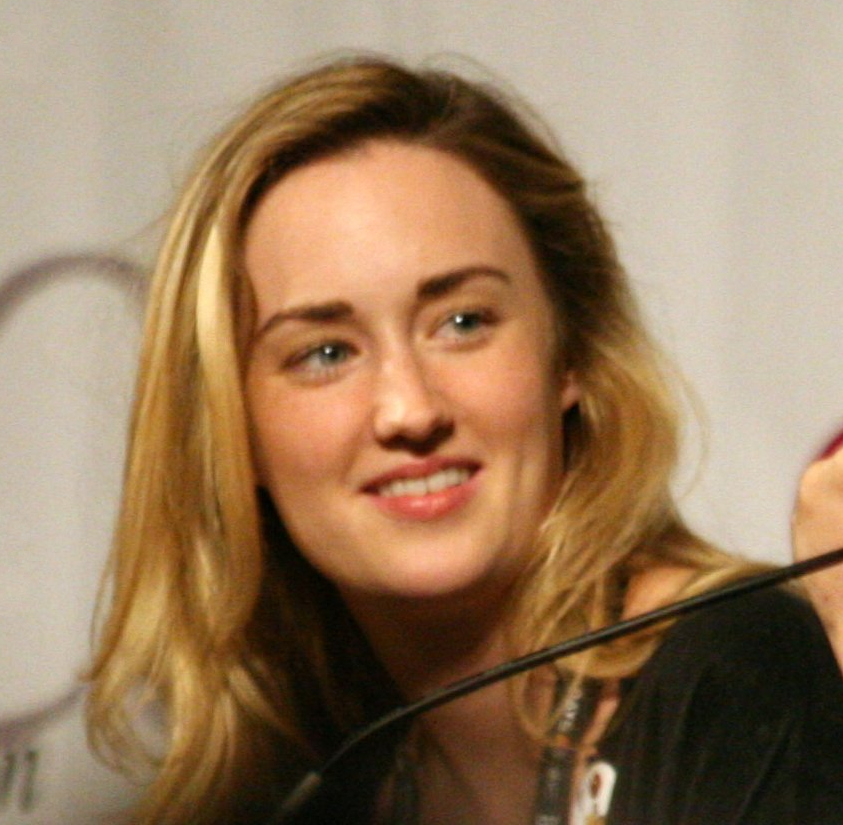

- Ashley Johnson as Jenny Applesauce
- Michael Johnson as Young Orange

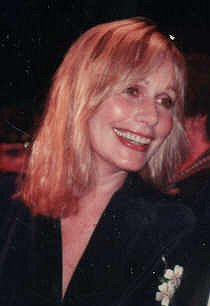

- Sally Kellerman as Romaine Empress, Marshmallow Queen

- Tom Kenny as Malacorn, Banger, Announcer, Kiwi Flight Attendant, Mandarin (Cutesie), Watermelon, Teddy Juicer, Onions, Herb, Mega Suck, Moriartichoke, The Beet-Uls, Grapes, Docturnip Who

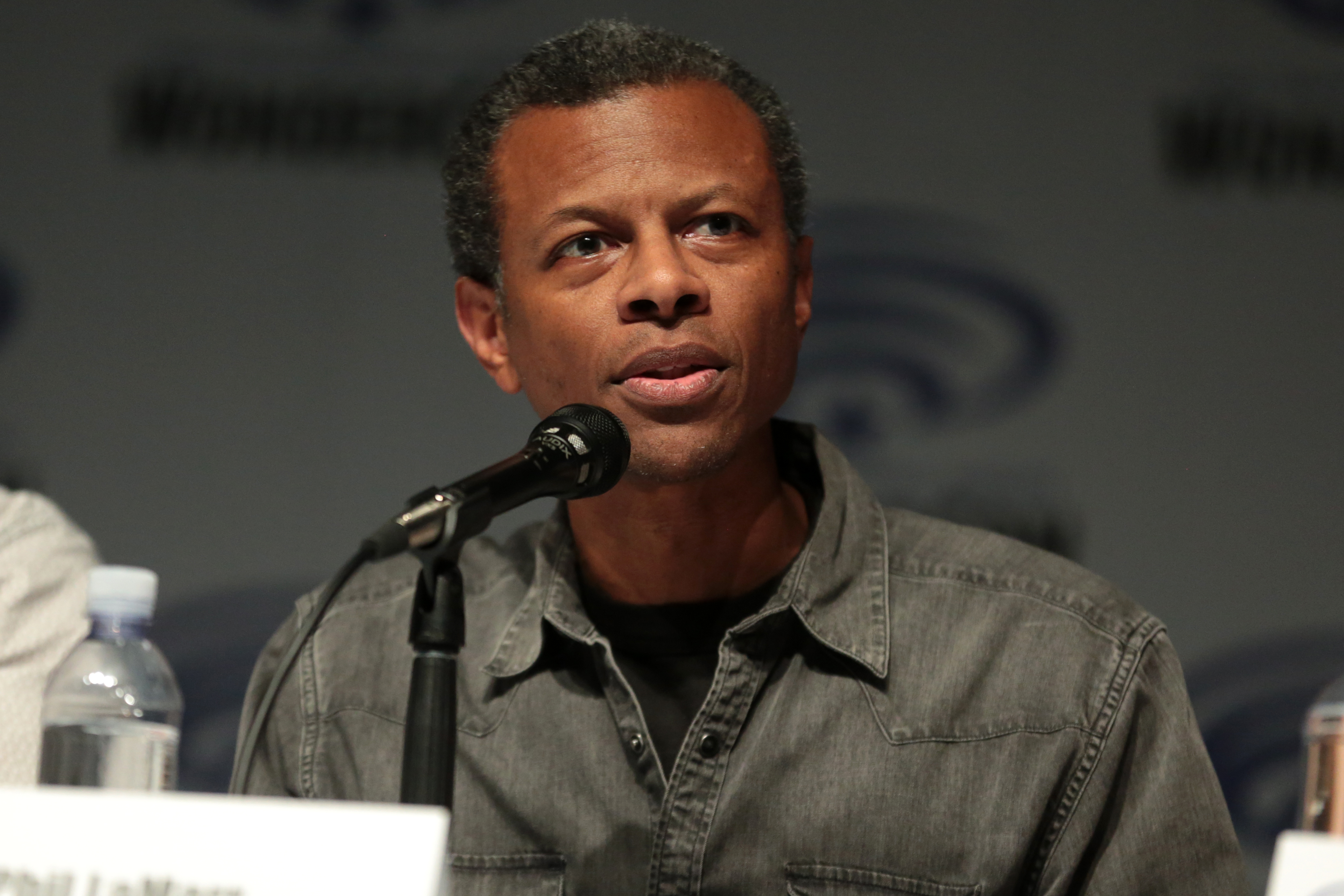

- Phil LaMarr as Corny, Samuel Jackfruit, Auto Pilot, Fusilli the Kid, Brianca, Cupcake, The Breeze Member #3, Apple (Fruiturama), Bobby, Eggplant

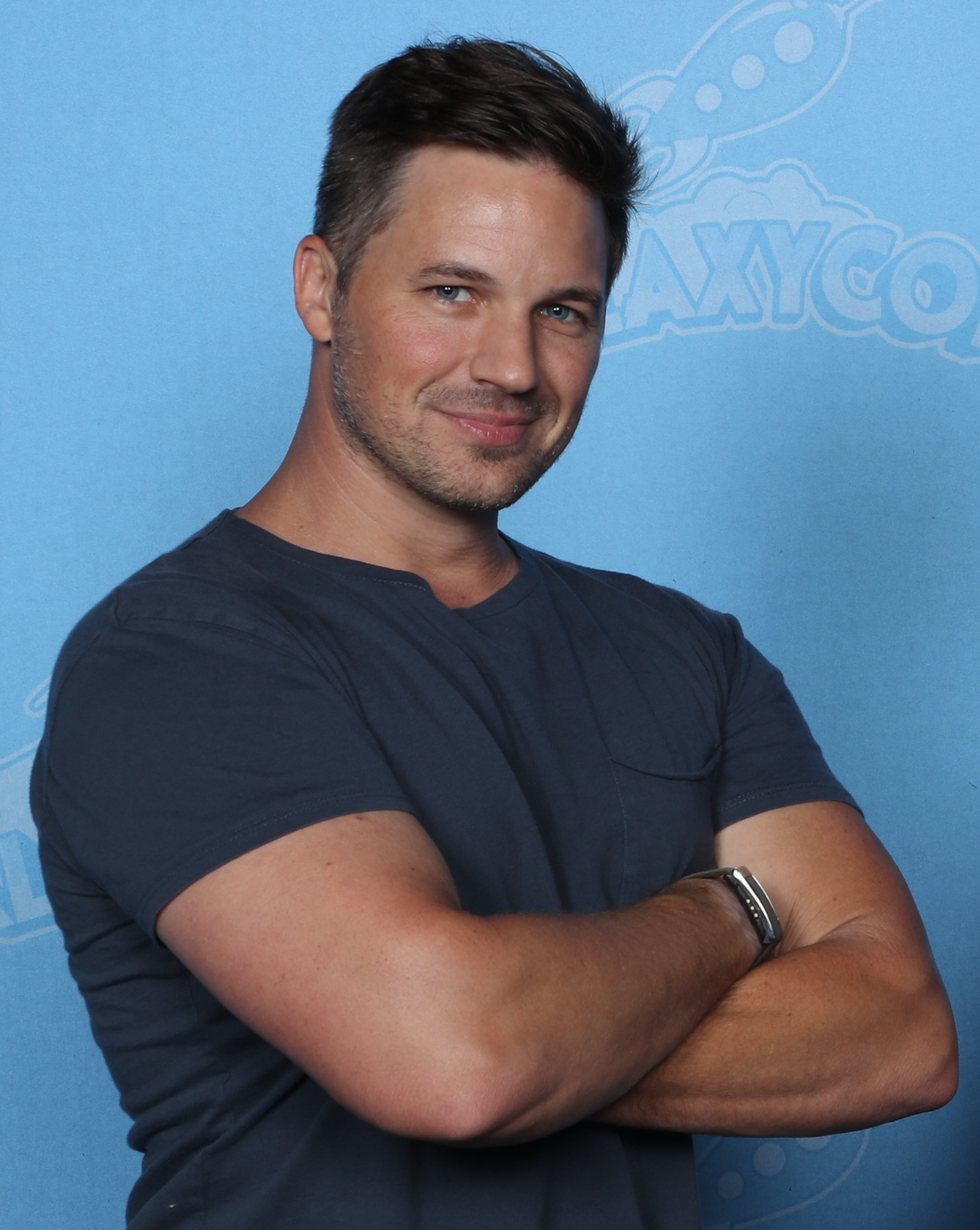

- Matt Lanter as Pepper Jack Actor

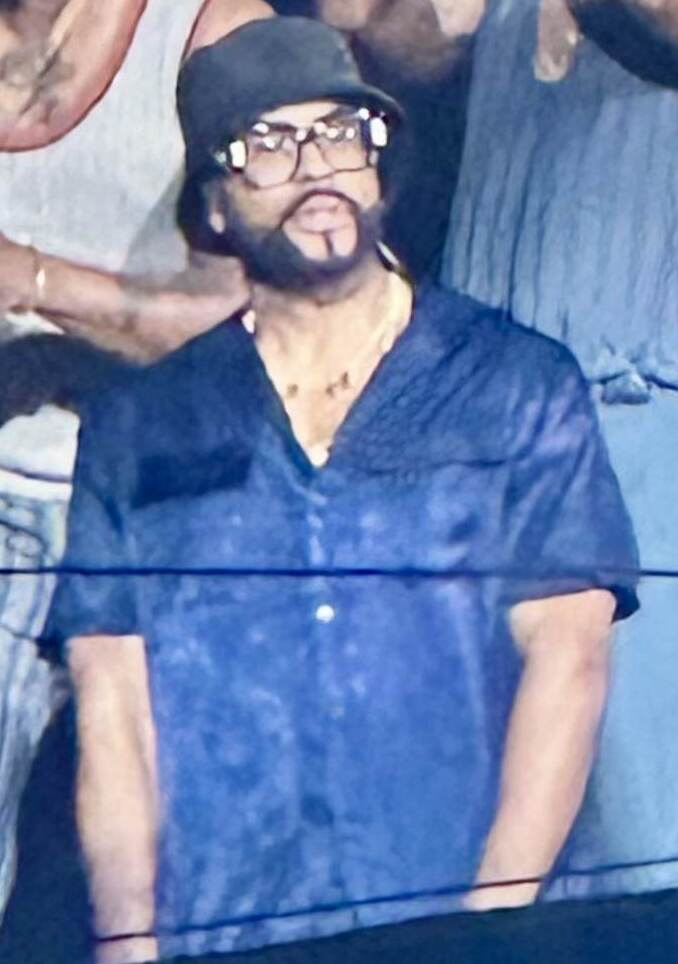

- Philip Lawrence as Granola, Mix Master BLT

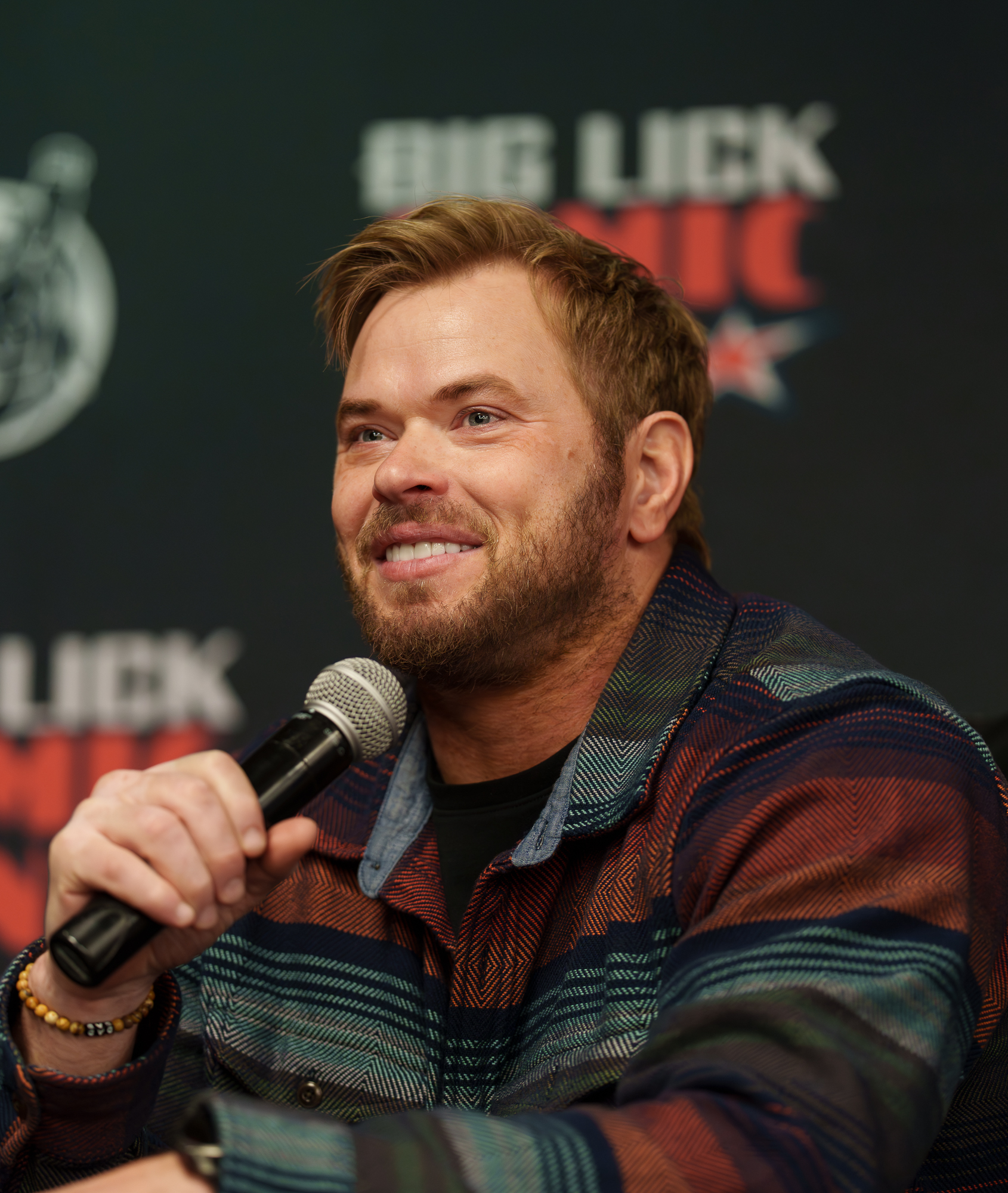

- Kellan Lutz as King Potadectes, Pie-Clops

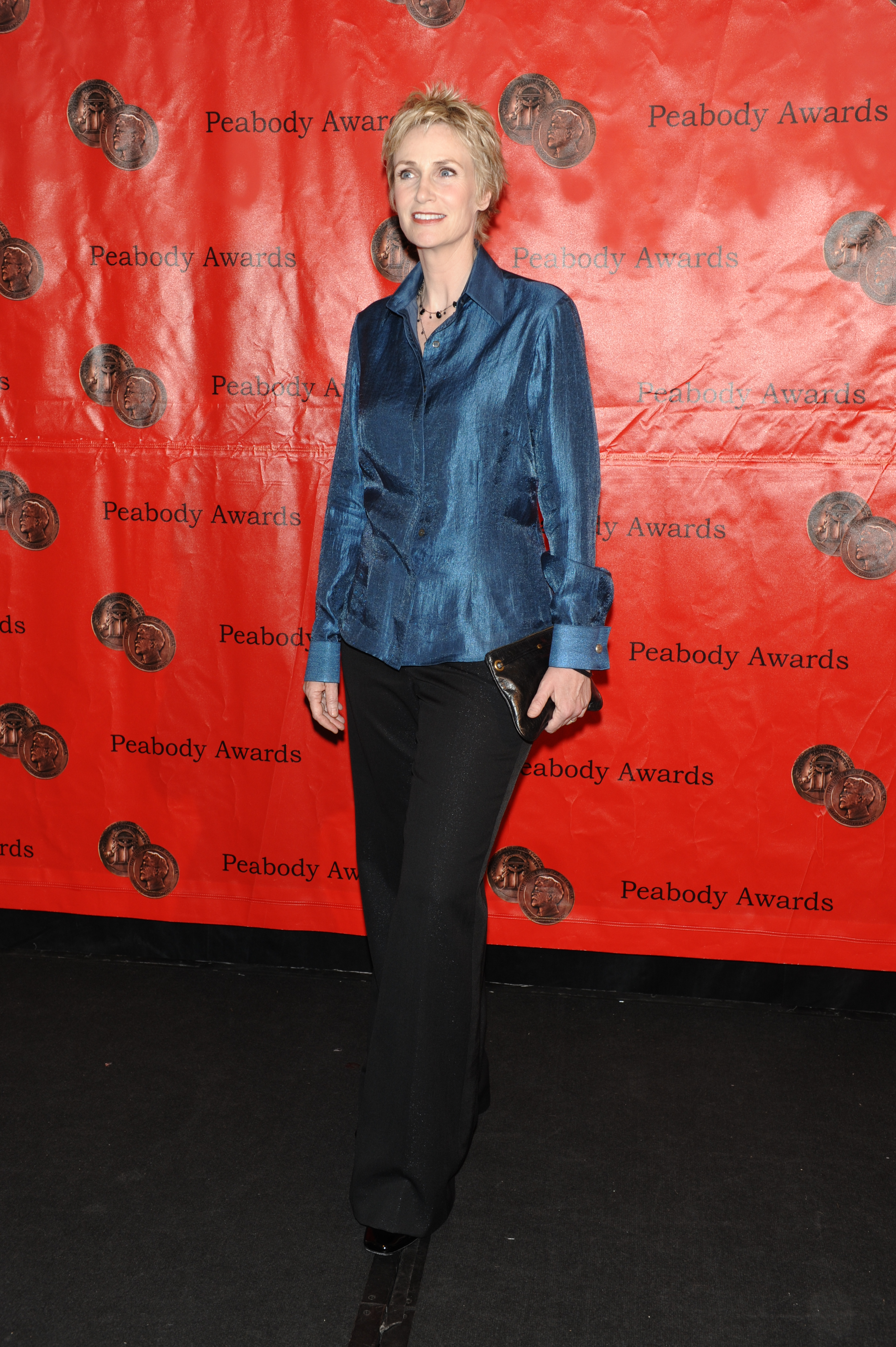

- Jane Lynch as Cob
- Aaron Massey as Green Apple

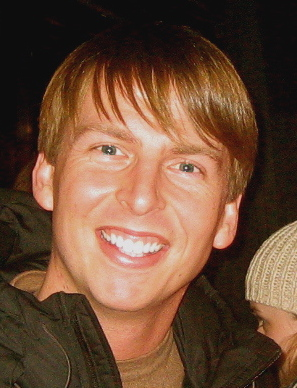

- Jack McBrayer as Fruitsy the Snowfruit

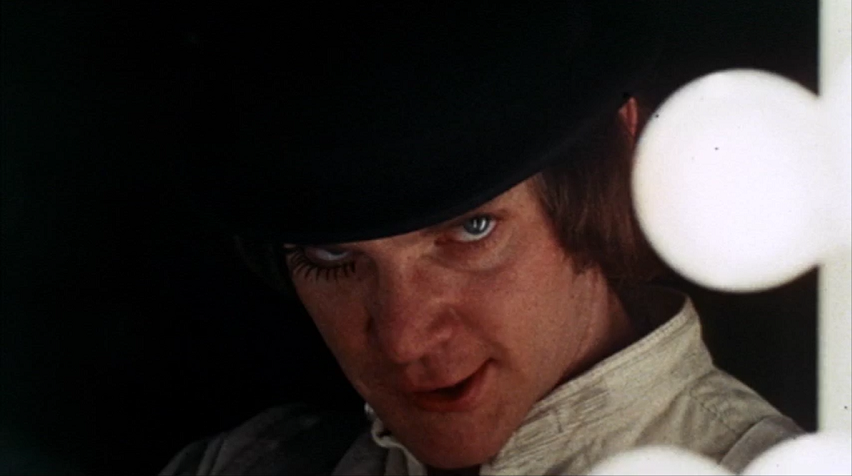

- Malcolm McDowell as the Dark Knight

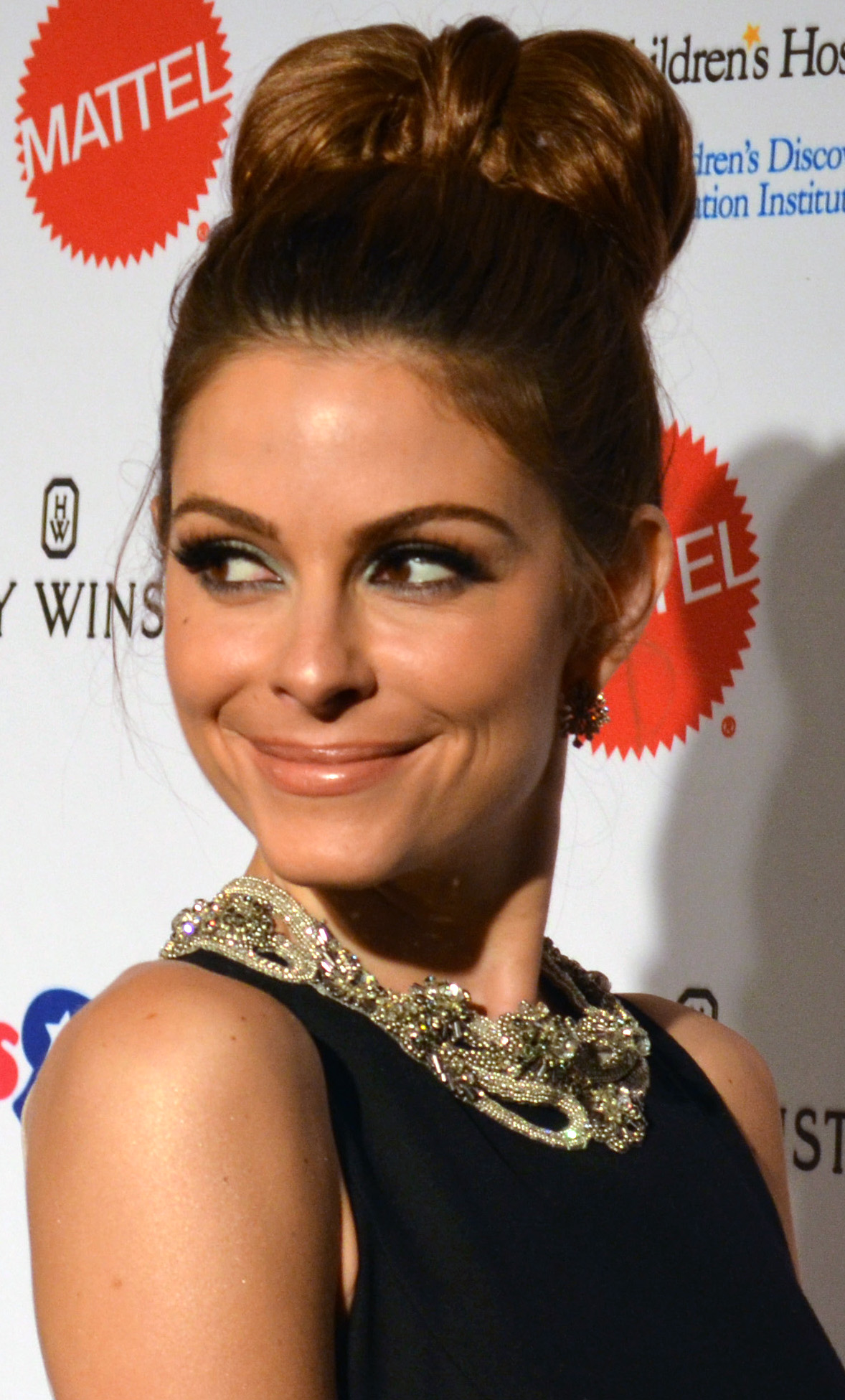

- Maria Menounos as Herself

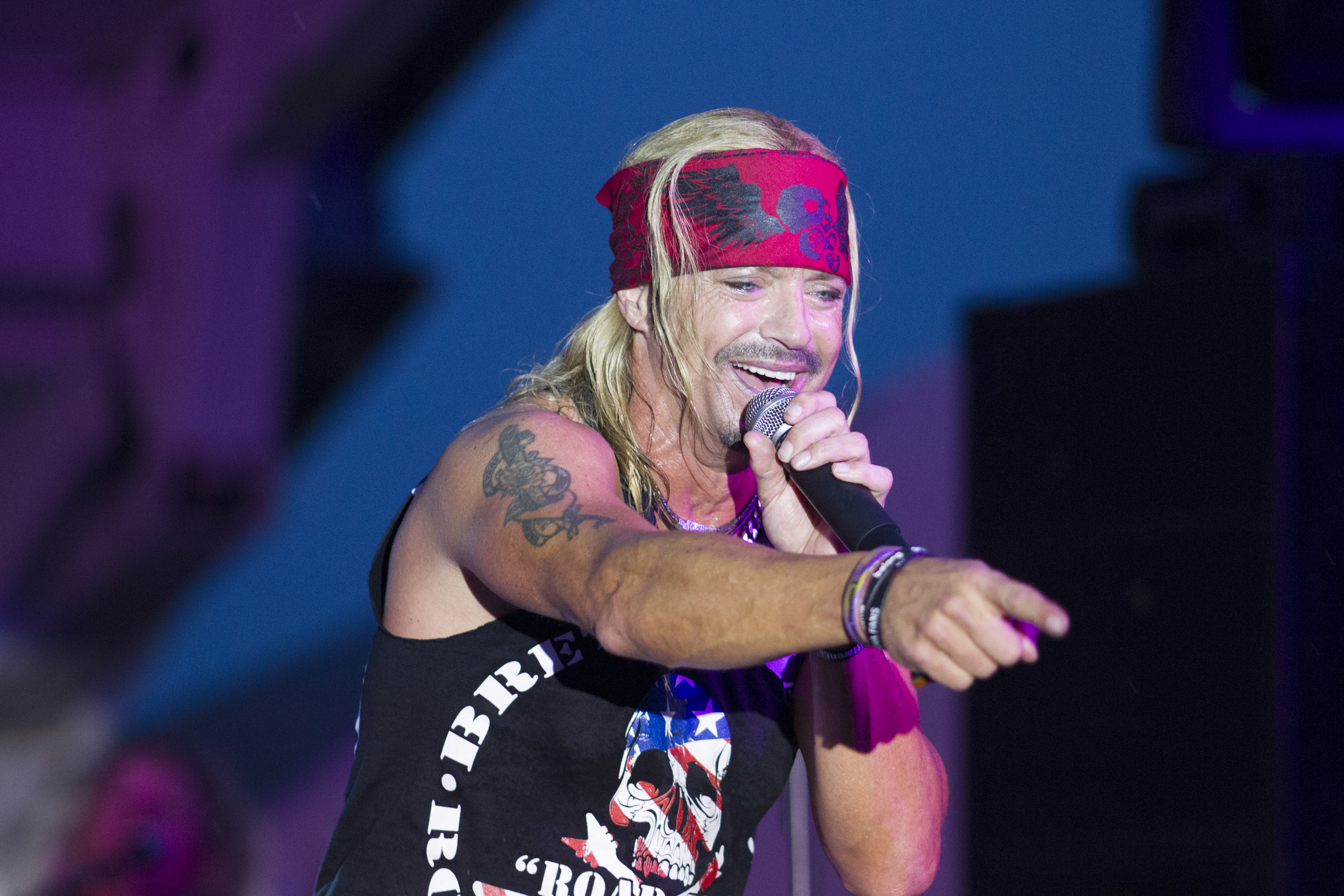

- Bret Michaels as Himself, Knife

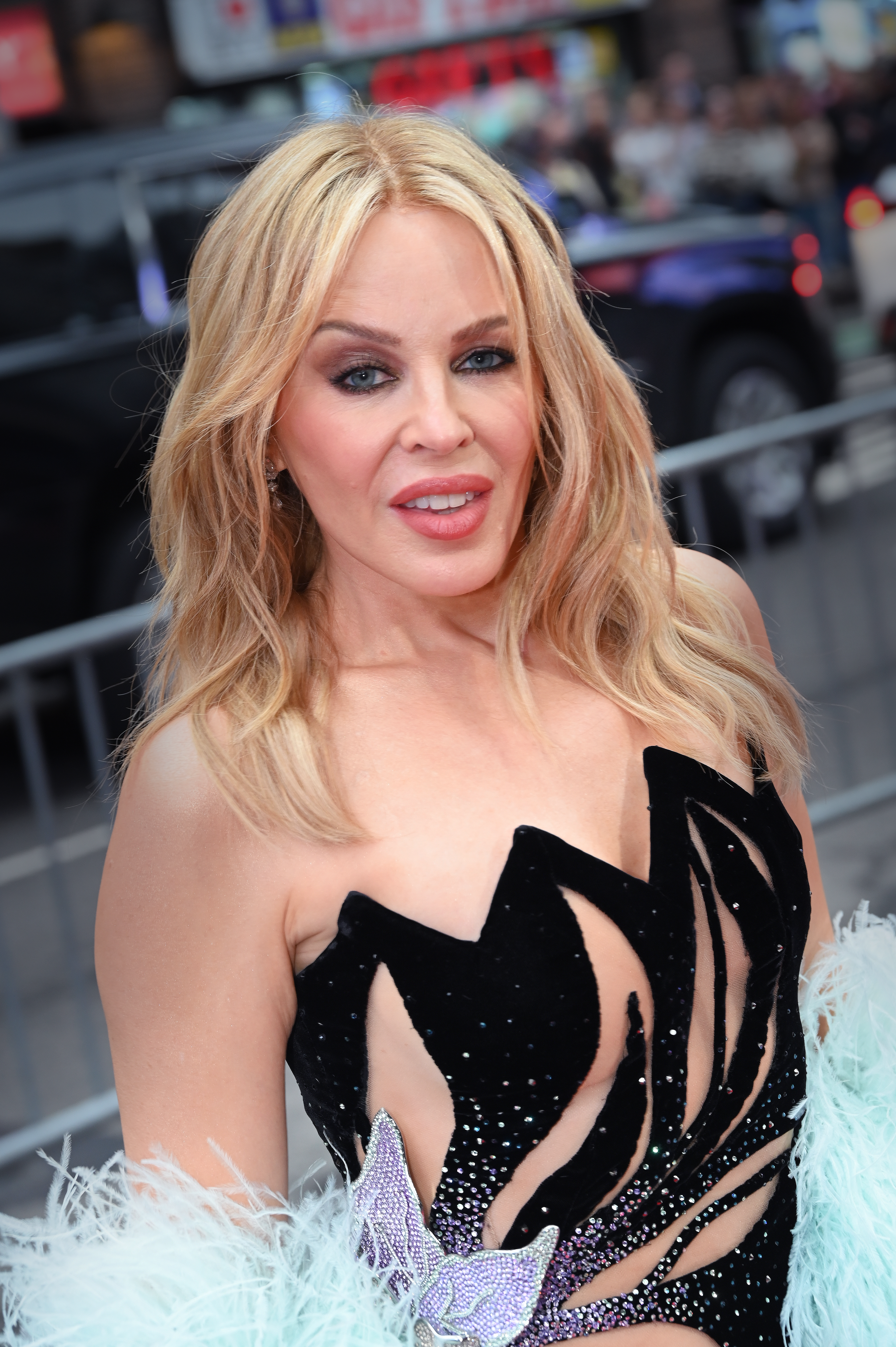

- Kylie Minogue as Herself
- Brandon Molale as Thug

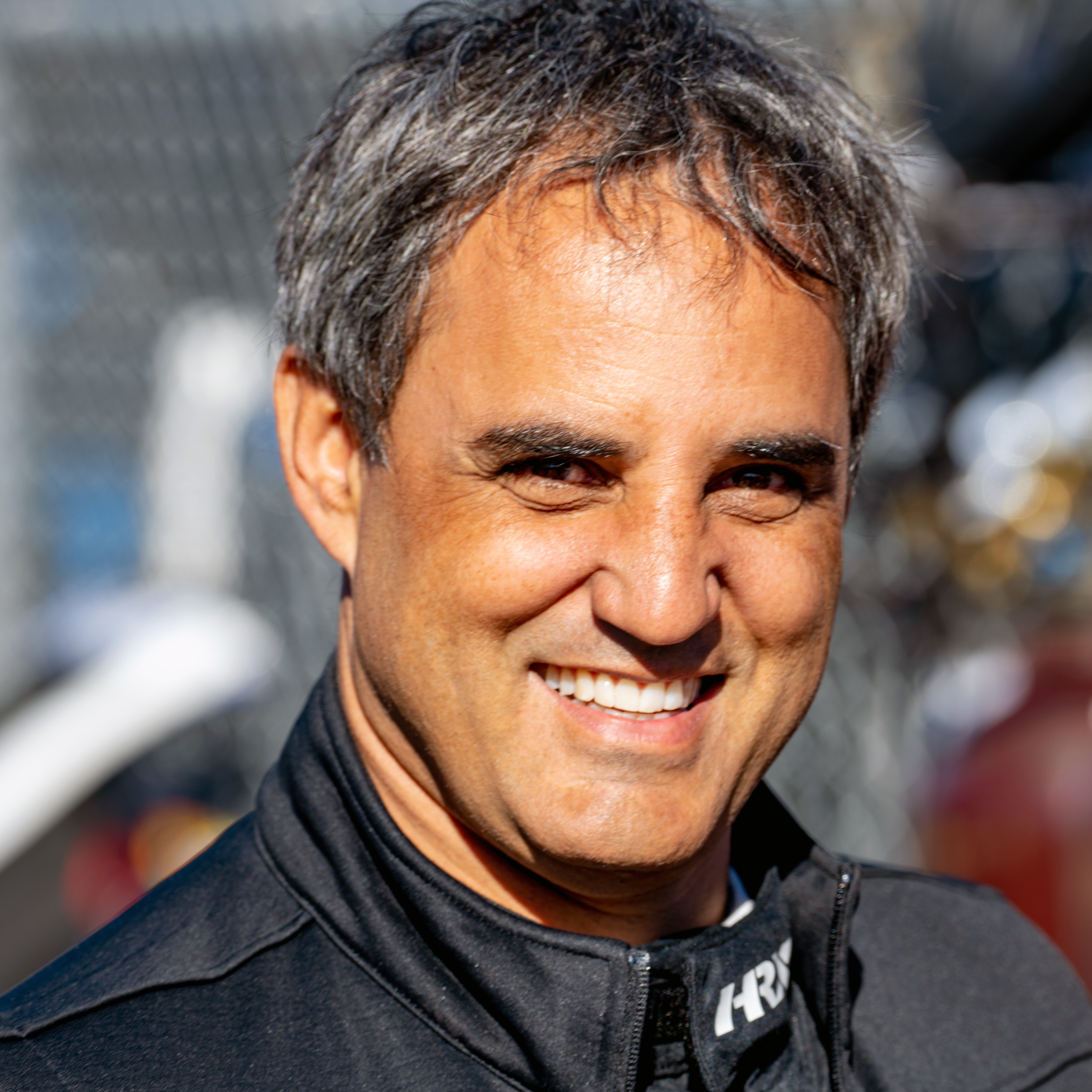

- Juan Pablo Montoya as Papaya Cherr-iot Driver

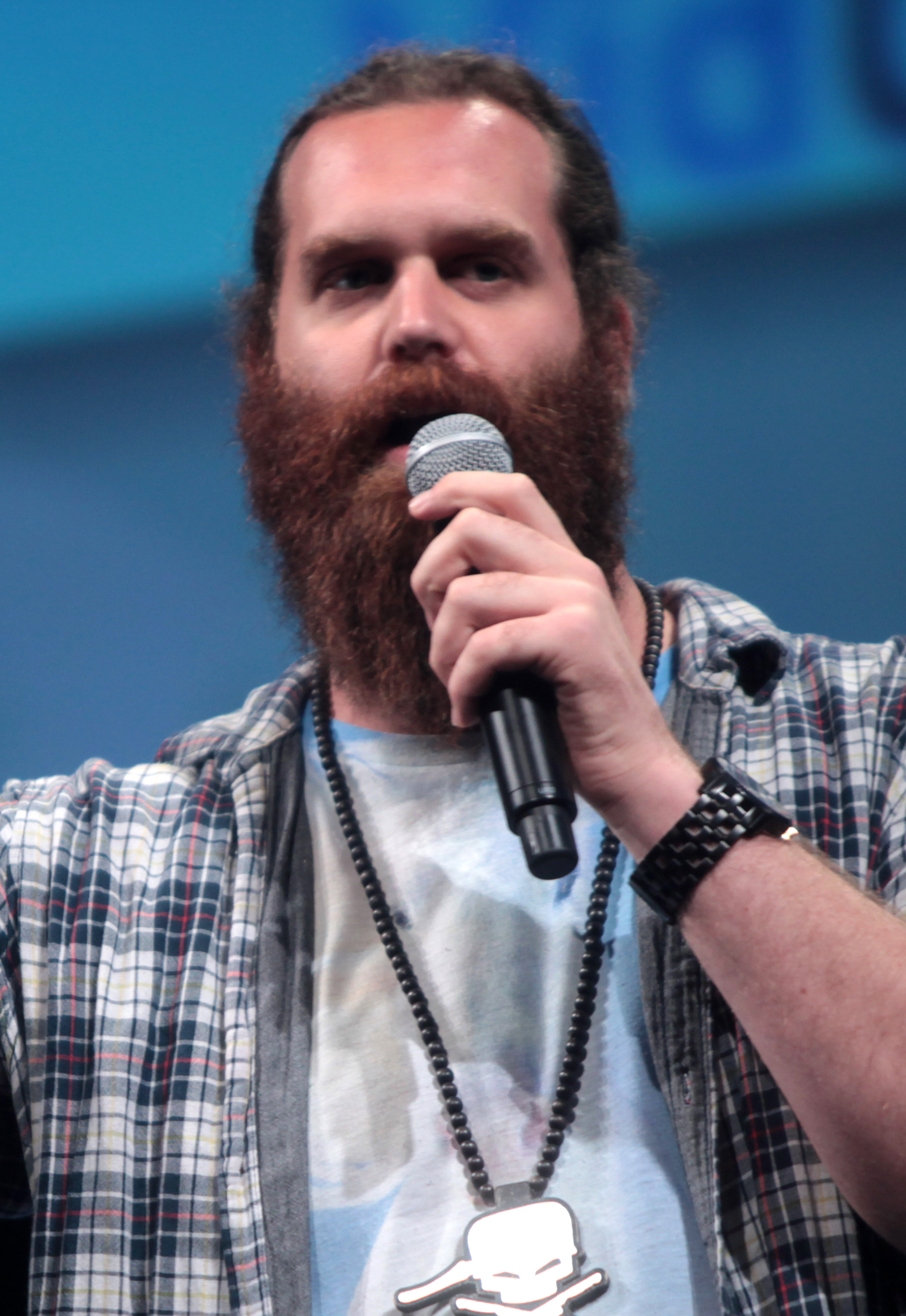

- Harley Morenstein as Cabbag

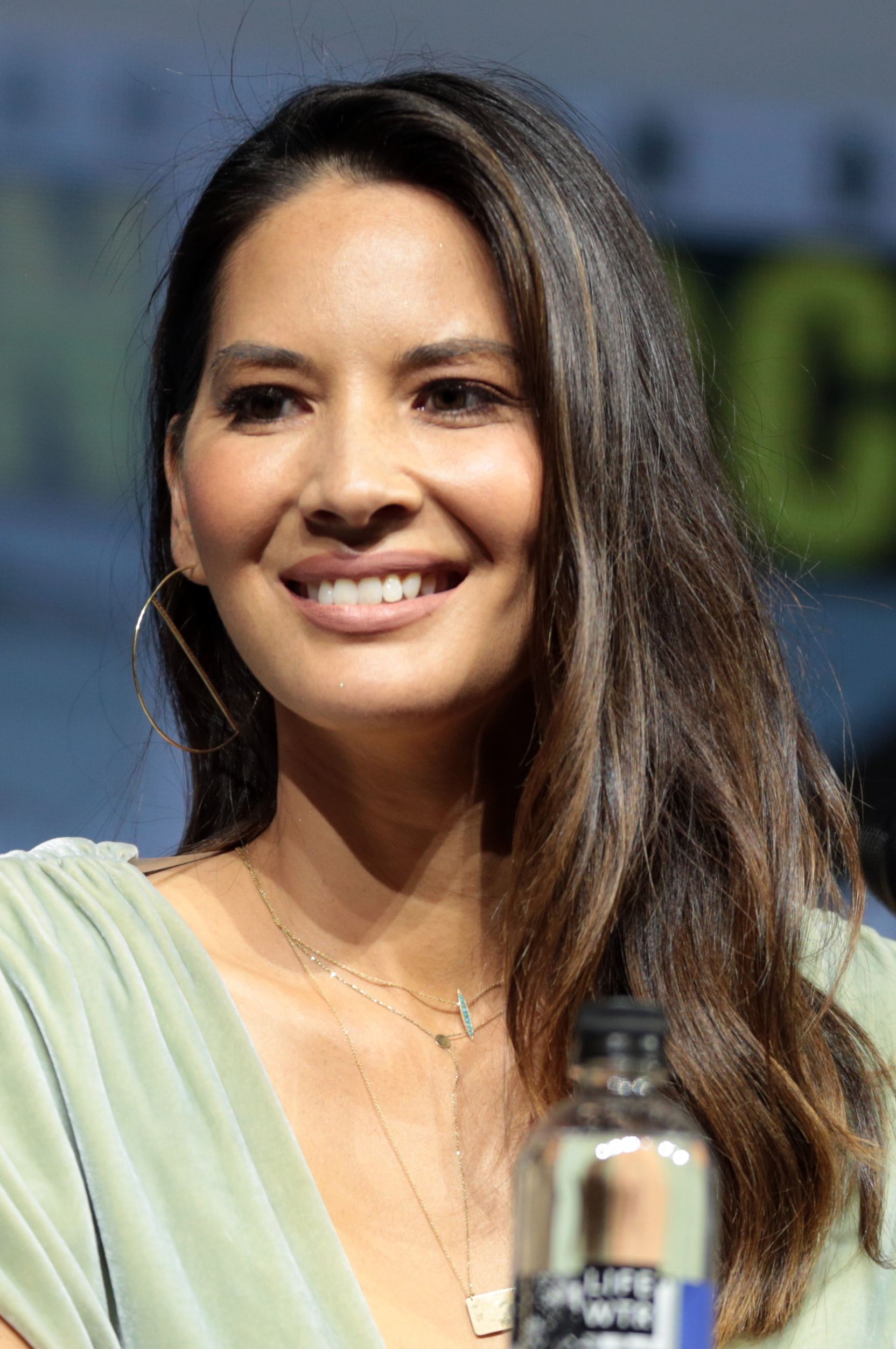

- Olivia Munn as Fudgie, Marion
- Erin Pearce as Pear Costume Performer

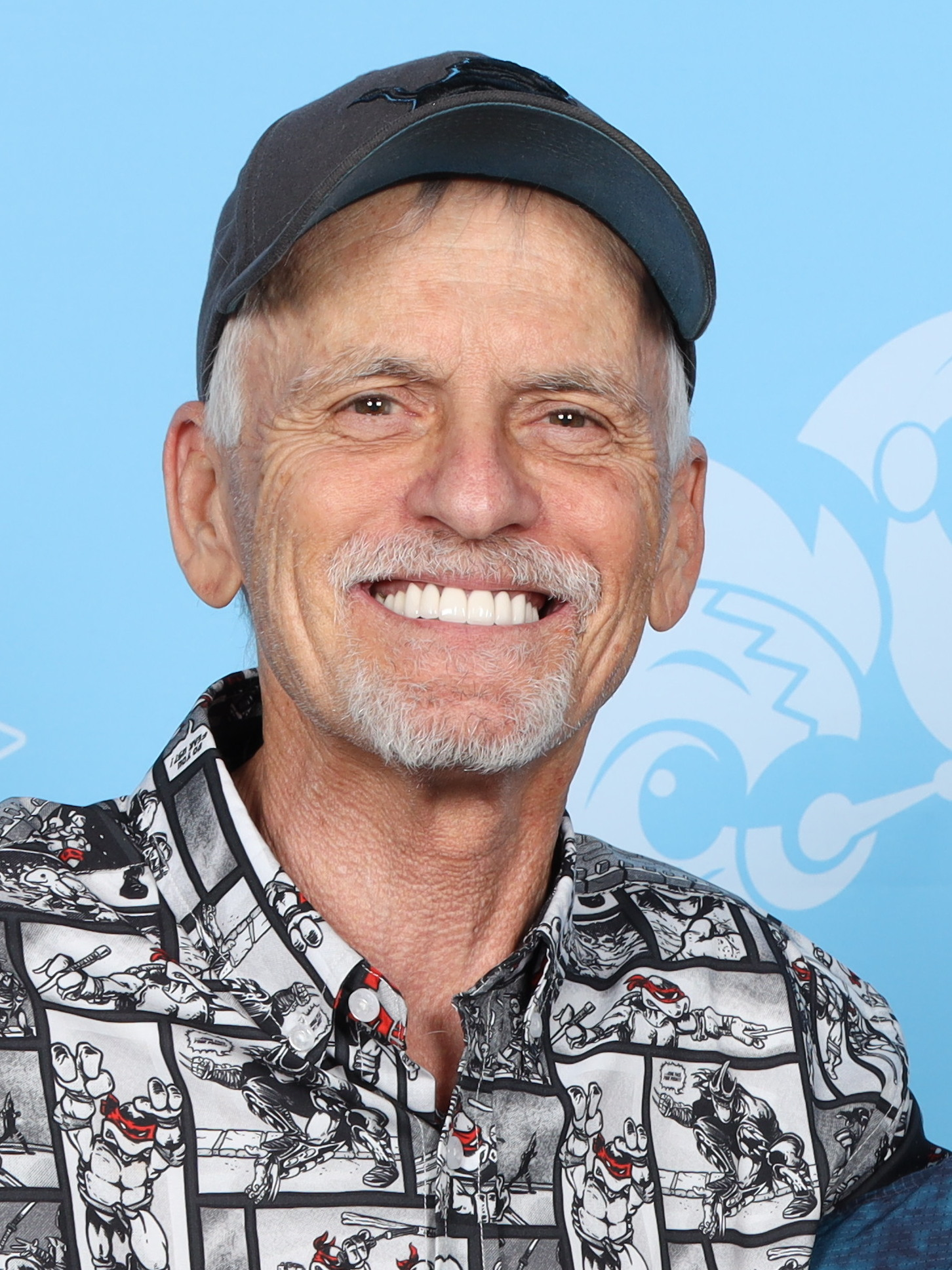

- Rob Paulsen as Marshmallow Warriors, Dr. Sigmund Fruit, Dr. Fruitenstein, Head Sour Grape, Thomas Jefferson, Rock, Apricot, President Dane, Junior, Dr. Bananas, Green Apple

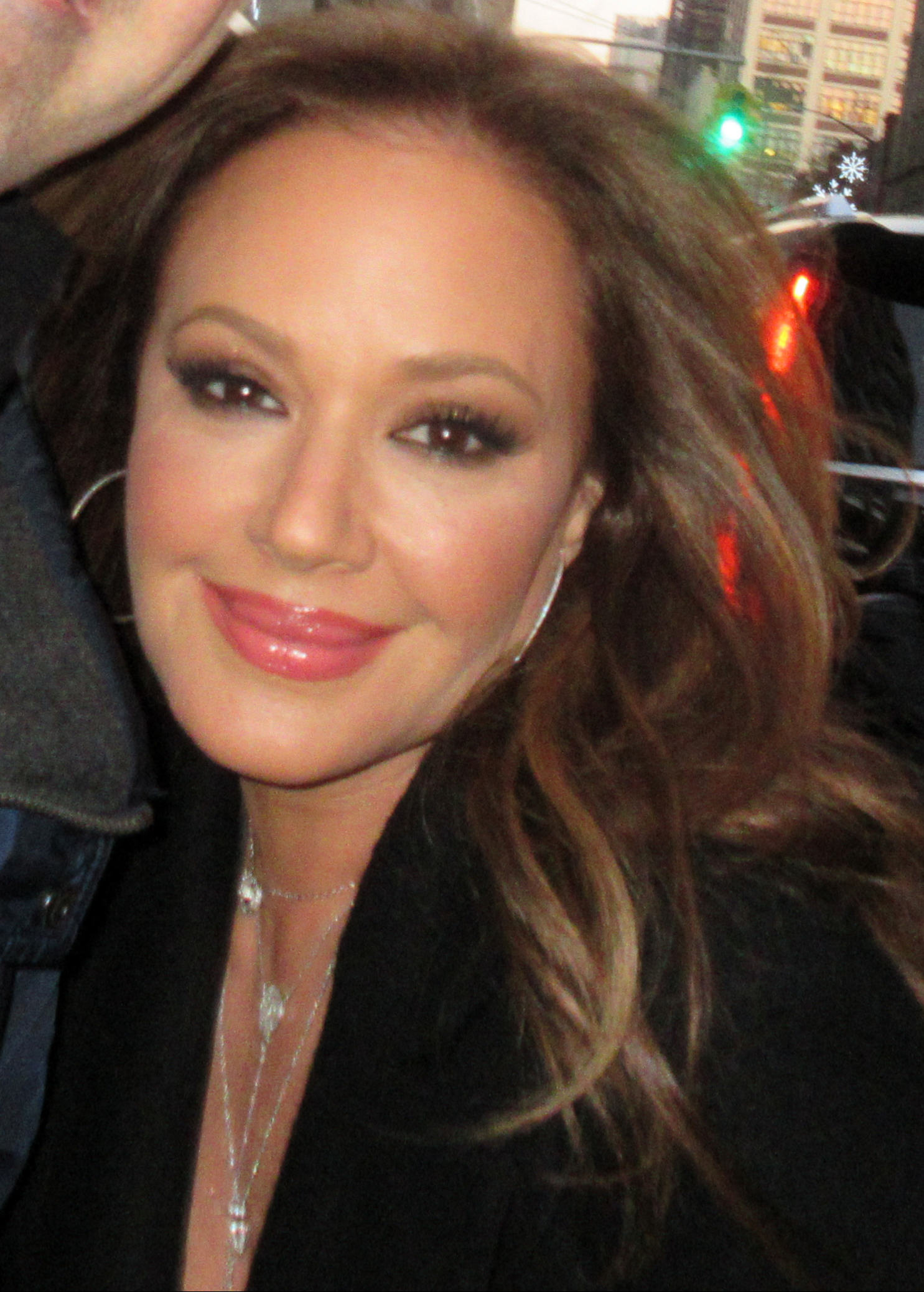

- Leah Remini as Polly Prune
- Tom Sheppard as Cowboy, Unicorn DJ Princess Buttercup, Eggplant, Turnip, Onion, Li'l Squishy, Neighborhood Watch Posse, Singer, Pear-O-Smith, Assistant Foreman

- Slash as Squish the Guitarist

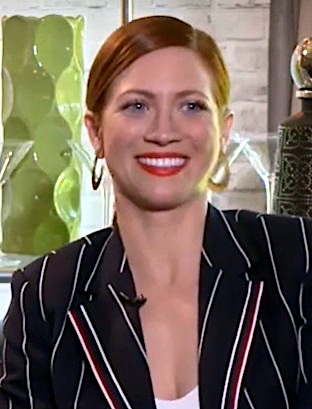

- Brittany Snow as Chick Pea Singer, Clementine

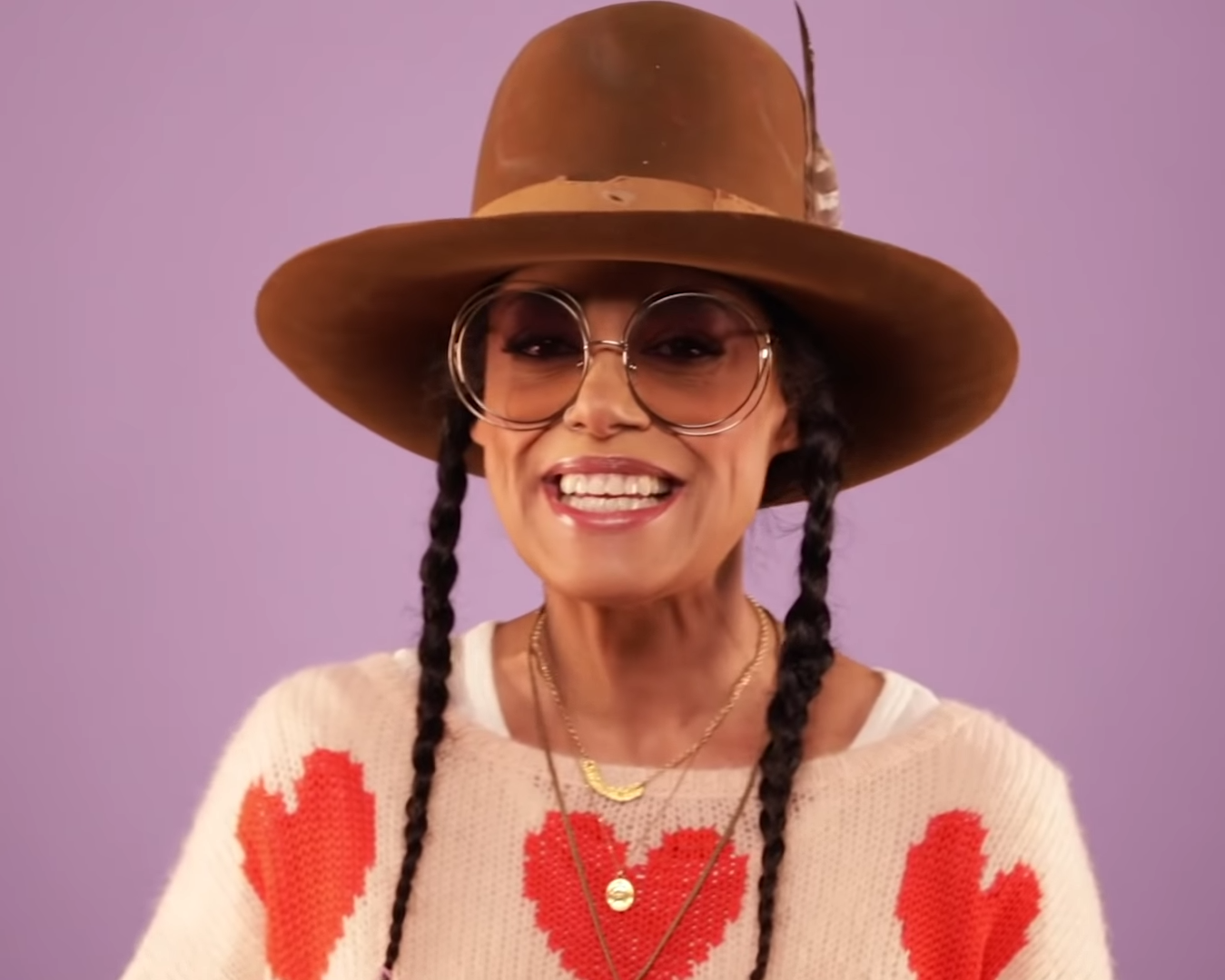

- Cree Summer as Apple Singer, Honey Doo-Doo, Pomegranate, The Pom Pom Girls

- Nick Swardson as Jason Jr., Zorzam

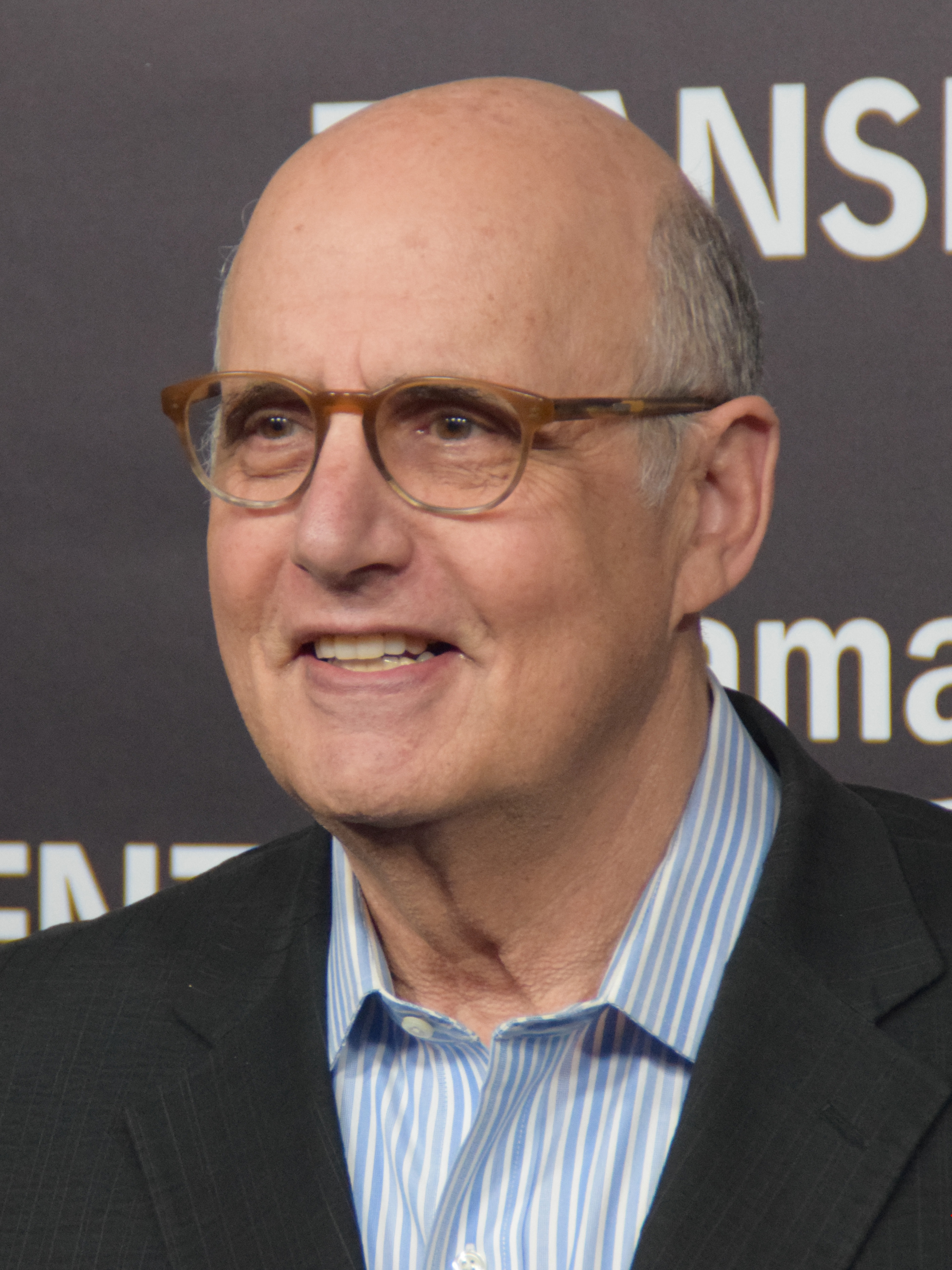

- Jeffrey Tambor as Mr. Orange, Blueberry
- Jim Tasker as FNN Announcer, Fruit Fruitale

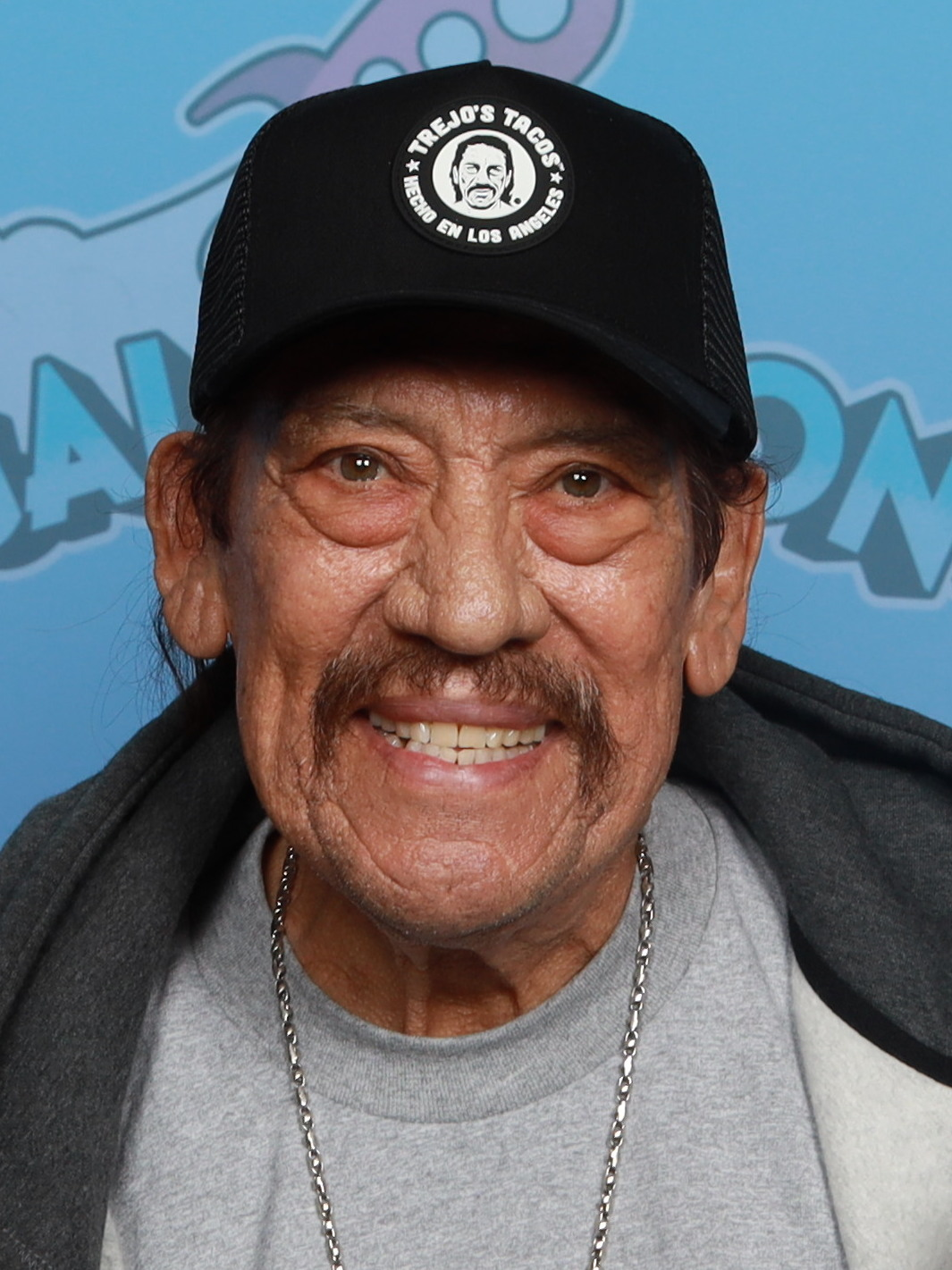

- Danny Trejo as Cupcake Leader, El Dente

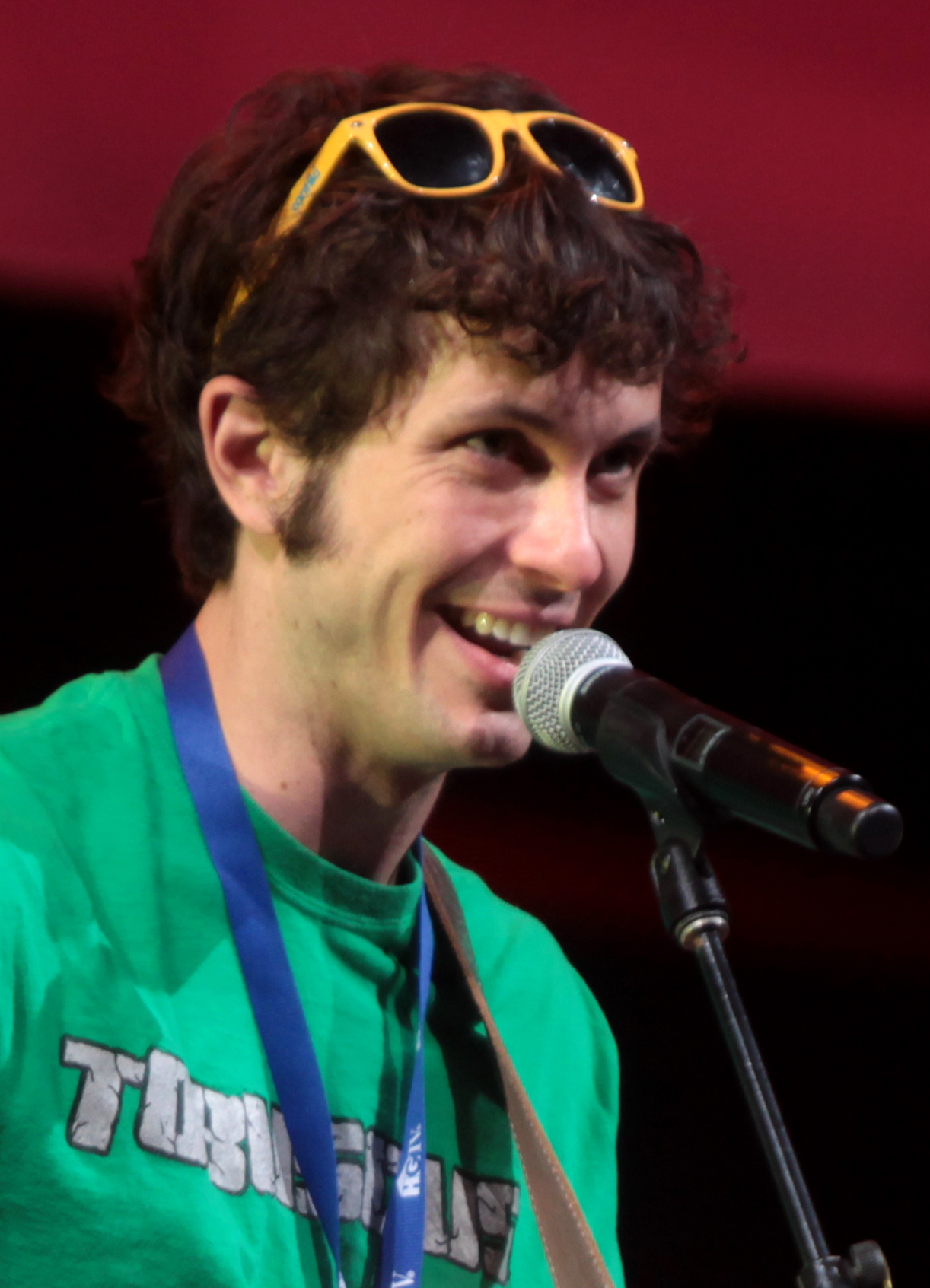

- Toby Turner as Mega Suck, Smithins

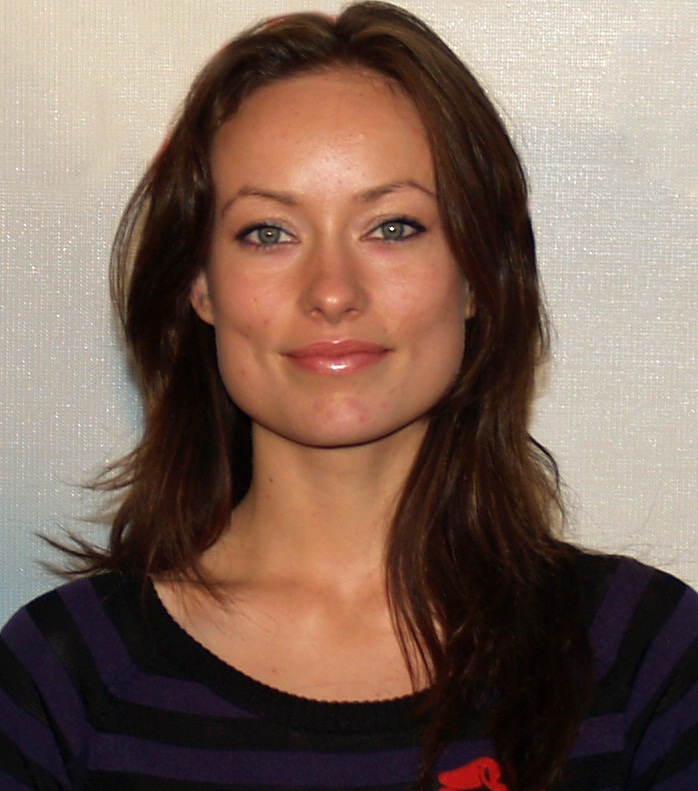

- Olivia Wilde as Rainbow Fairy

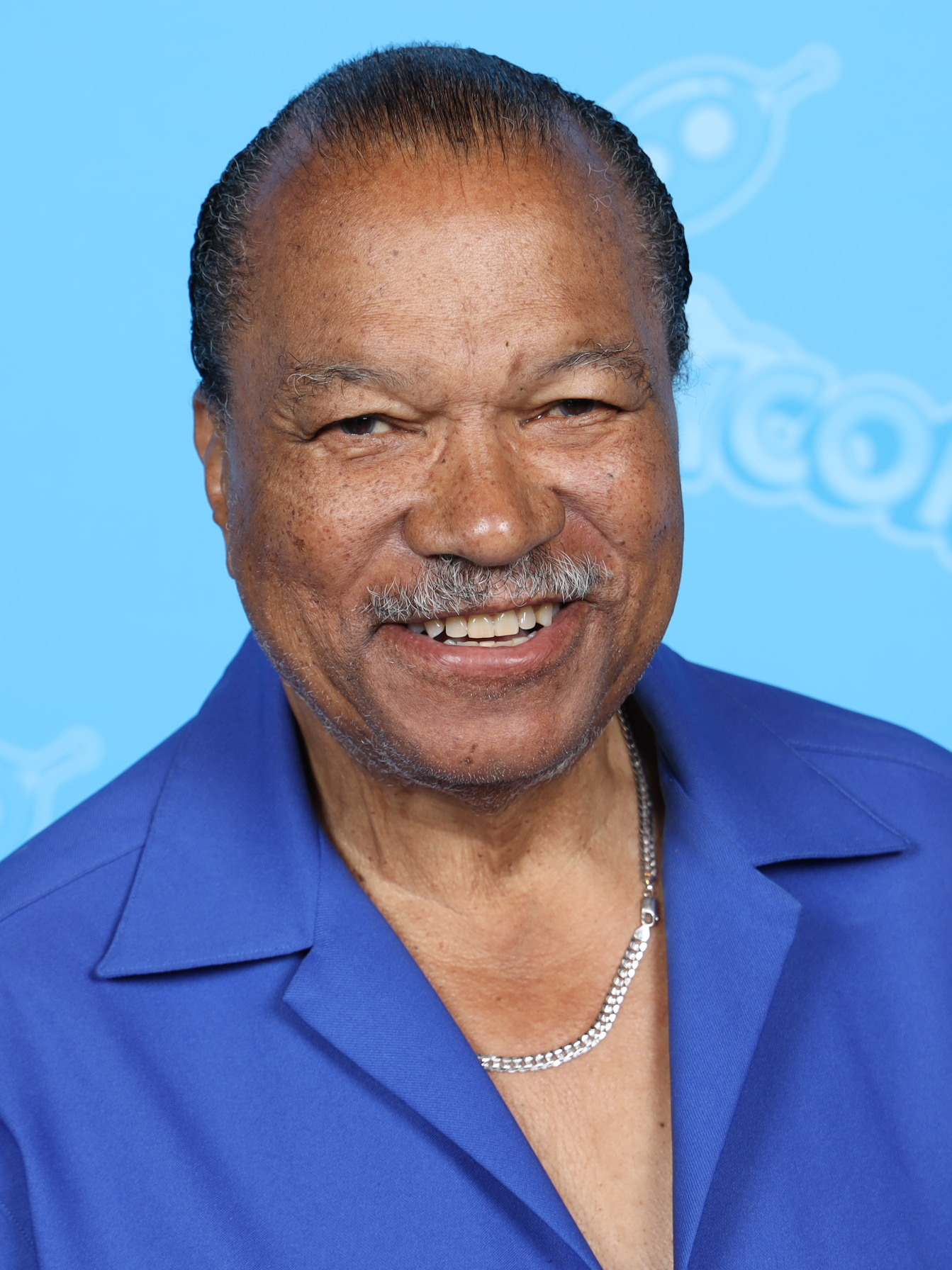

- Billy Dee Williams as Old Carrot, Cucumber Referee

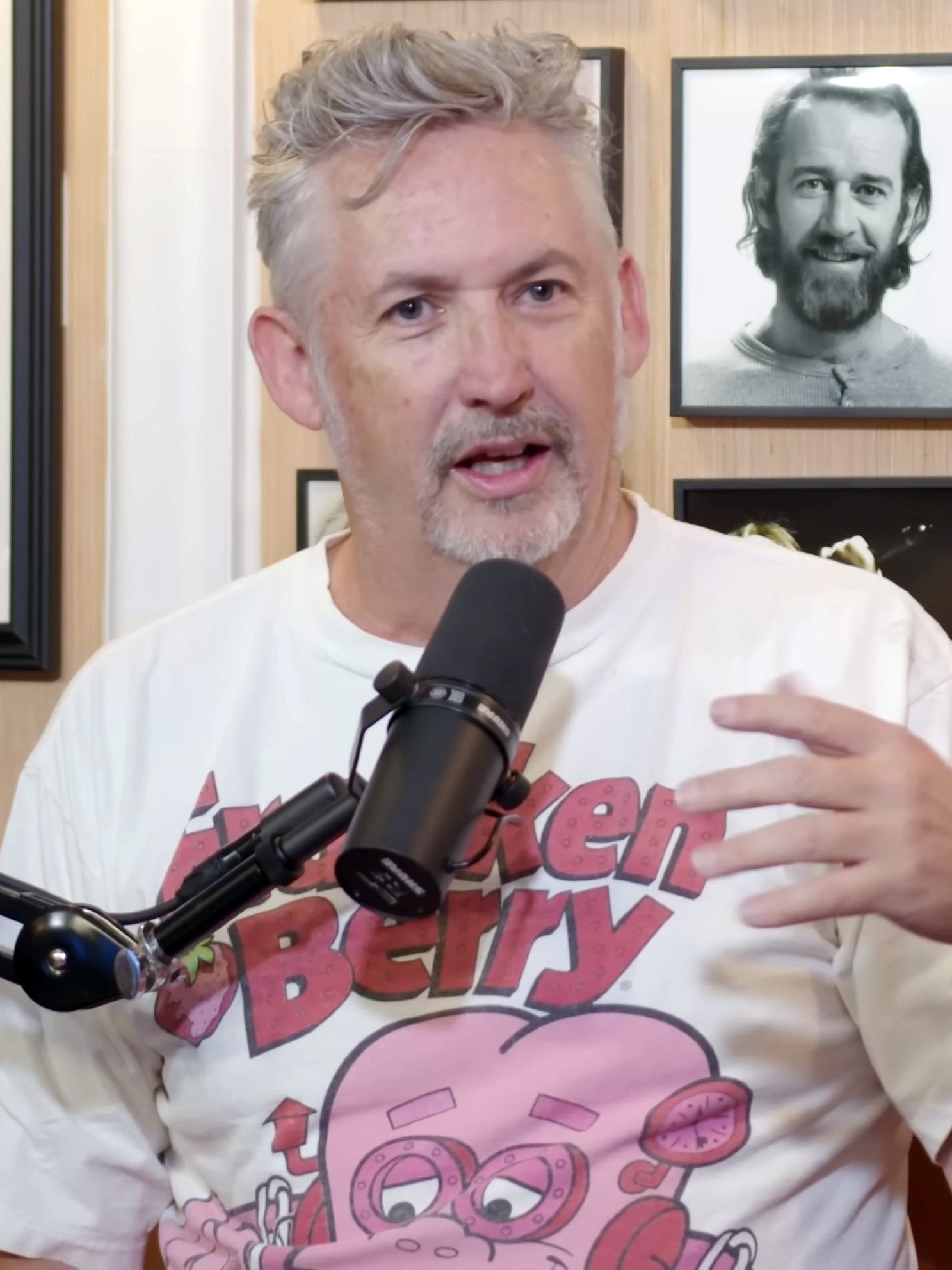

- Harland Williams as Corn, Milk Bottle, Neighborhood Watch Posse, Grapes, Ninja Tomato Leader, Lime, Eggplant, Banana, Zucchini
- Matthew Willig as Thug

- Rainn Wilson as Dr. Po

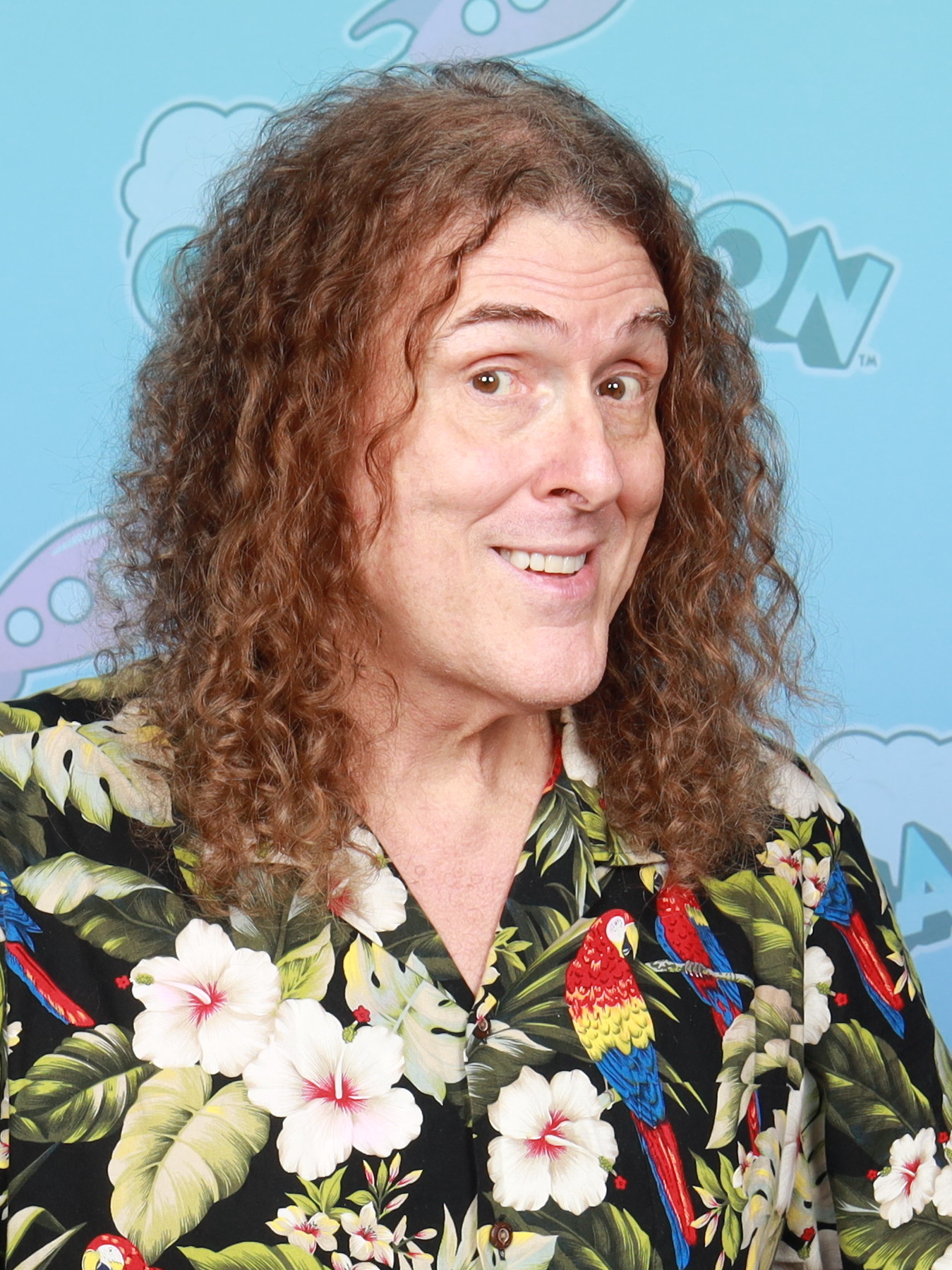

- "Weird Al" Yankovic as Himself, Sherleek Holmes, Bruce Dillas, Pumpkin

== Production ==
Boedigheimer confirmed that she had started producing a TV series based on Annoying Orange in April 2010. Boedigheimer finished the script for the first six episodes of the show in October of that year. When Boedigheimer began filming the pilot episode of the TV show in February 2011, she discussed with Cartoon Network about airing it on the station, which was picked up on November 18 of that year. The pilot episode had been completed in about six to seven months.

There were originally intended to be six episodes of the show, but the season 1 episode order was eventually increased to 30 segments. Subsequently, the show was green-lit for a 30-episode second season, premiering on May 16, 2013.

The show was produced by Boedigheimer, Conrad Vernon and Tom Sheppard, co-executive-produced by Spencer Grove, Kevin Brueck, Robert Jennings and Aaron Massey, and produced with Gary Binkow, Michael Green and Dan Weinstein.

Most of the visual effects, compositing, off-line, on-line, audio, RED camera footage, graphics, and animation were performed at Kappa Studios in Burbank, California. The episodes were completed in six days using the Adobe Creative Suite, with each episode having 47,000 frames over stabilization. 3D software such as Cinema 4D and Lightwave were used in the second season. Production for season 2 was completed in October 2013. Despite having a lot of live-action, the show is still considered a cartoon.

== Cancellation ==
On December 5, 2014, Boedigheimer publicly confirmed the cancellation of the series on her web series, Daneboe Exposed. On April 24, 2015, Boedigheimer claimed that one of the main causes of the series' cancellation was the shutdown of their studio. Collective Digital Studio closed its film and television division and was subsequently acquired by ex-Kirch media company ProSiebenSat.1 Media.

== DVD releases ==
The series has one DVD release containing its 1st season.

Season	Release dates
Region 1
1	May 28, 2013

== Reception ==
A sneak peek aired on May 28, 2012, and the series officially premiered on June 11, 2012, as the #1 telecast among boys from six to eleven that day. In its first two weeks, the show averaged nearly 2.5 million viewers. The show received mixed reviews from critics.
