= Giambruno =

Giambruno is an Italian surname. Notable people with the surname include:

- Andrea Giambruno (born 1981), italian first gentleman
- Juan Giambruno (born 1950), Uruguayan surgeon
- Marco Giambruno (born 1985), Italian footballer
- Mark Giambruno (born 1957), American 3D artist, art director, and writer
