= Happy Tree Friends (TV series) =

Adult Flash-animated television series

- DVD cover art
- Based on: Happy Tree Friends by: Aubrey Ankrum; Rhode Montijo; Kenn Navarro
- Directed by: Kenn Navarro
- Countries of origin: United States; Canada
- No. of seasons: 1
- No. of episodes: 13 (39 segments)

Production
- Production company: Mondo Media

Original release
- Network: G4
- Release: October 3 – December 25, 2006 (Note: https://web.archive.org/web/20061016163846/http://www.g4tv.com/happytreefriends/episodes/5998/Party_Animal.html)

Happy Tree Friends is an adult-oriented Flash-animated television series that was broadcast from October 3, 2006 to December 25, 2006, on G4 in the United States. With a total of thirteen episodes that were aired, the show is based on the web series of the same name, created and developed by Aubrey Ankrum, Rhode Montijo, Kenn Navarro, and Warren Graff for Mondo Media. The series was animated by Canadian studio Fatkat, while the opening and end credits were produced by Ghostbot.

The series is a juxtaposition of cute cartoon anthropomorphic forest animals, who are suddenly subjected to extreme graphic violence. Each episode revolves around the characters enduring accidental or deliberately inflicted pain or mutilation.

== Cast ==
- Kenn Navarro as Cuddles, Flippy, Lifty and Shifty
- Ellen Connell as Giggles, Petunia, and Cub
- Warren Graff as Toothy and Handy
- David Winn as Lumpy and Splendid
- Michael Lipman as Nutty
- Liz Stuart as Sniffles
- Aubrey Ankrum as Pop and Fliqpy
- Nica Lorber as Flaky
- Peter Hermann as Disco Bear
- Francis Carr as Russell
- Sarah Castelblanco as Mime (audible noises only)

== Episodes ==
No.	Title	Written by	Original release date
1	"The Wrong Side of the Tracks"	Kenn Navarro, Ken Pontac, Warren Graff, Aubrey Ankrum, and Jeff Biancalana	October 31, 2006 (Note: https://web.archive.org/web/20130808193812/http://www.g4tv.com/happytreefriends/episodes/6127/the-wrong-side-of-the-tracks.html)
1	"From Hero to Eternity"	Kenn Navarro, David Winn, Ken Pontac, and Warren Graff	October 31, 2006
1	"And the Kitchen Sink"	Kenn Navarro, Ken Pontac, and David Ichioka	October 31, 2006
The Happy Tree Friends go to Lumpy's fun fair, but the roller coaster seems to be incomplete, troubling both the riders and Lumpy himself. Starring: Lumpy and Sniffles; Featuring: Cuddles, Flaky, Mime, Nutty, Giggles, Petunia, Disco Bear, Russell, Lifty and Shifty; Moral: "If a job is worth doing, it's worth doing right!" Splendid has to go to the laundry, but also has to stop a giant snowball from destroying the forest. Starring: Splendid; Featuring: Giggles, Cuddles, Pop and Cub; Moral: "It all comes out in the wash!" Pop loses Cub, but then finds him playing in the mud. Then, however, while he bathes Cub in the kitchen sink, when he makes the mistake of leaving to pick up the phone, he causes all sorts of trouble for him. Starring: Pop and Cub Moral: "Don't throw the baby out with the bathwater!"
2	"Party Animal"	Kenn Navarro, Ken Pontac, and Warren Graff	October 3, 2006 (Note: https://web.archive.org/web/20061016163846/http://www.g4tv.com/happytreefriends/episodes/5998/Party_Animal.html)
2	"Ipso Fatso"	Kenn Navarro, Ken Pontac, and Warren Graff	October 3, 2006
2	"Don't Yank My Chain"	Kenn Navarro, Ken Pontac, and Warren Graff	October 3, 2006
Flaky and her friends celebrate Flippy's birthday, but carnage erupts when he flips out again. Starring: Flaky and Flippy; Moral: "Life is a party and everyone is invited!" Disco Bear finds that he is overweight and feeling insecure, goes to the gym to work out – but it's not as easy as he expects. Starring: Disco Bear; Featuring: Featuring Giggles, Petunia, Lumpy, Sniffles, Toothy and Handy; Moral: "The way to one's heart is through their stomach." After being arrested by Officer Lumpy, Handy and The Mole go to the slammer and drag a heavy ball to their chain. Starring: Handy, The Mole and Lumpy; Featuring : Lifty and Shifty, Pop and Cub Moral: "A chain's only as strong as its weakest link!"
3	"Doggone It"	Kenn Navarro and Ken Pontac	October 10, 2006 (Note: https://web.archive.org/web/20061016163949/http://www.g4tv.com/happytreefriends/episodes/6011/Doggone_It.html)
3	"Concrete Solution"	Kenn Navarro and Ken Pontac	October 10, 2006
3	"Sea What I Found"	Kenn Navarro, Ken Pontac, and Warren Graff	October 10, 2006
Pop and Cub buy a puppy that seems harmless at first, but attacks them. Lumpy attempts to catch it, but the puppy escapes and goes insane whenever it hears a whistle. Starring: Lumpy, Pop and Cub; Featuring: Cuddles, Giggles, Disco Bear, Mime, Lifty and Shifty, and The Mole; Moral: "Let sleeping dogs lie!" Nutty takes a bag of sugar from the café while on his way home, but then drops the bag of sugar on a pile of cement bags and unknowingly takes a bag of cement home. When he eats the cement afterwards, he ends up in an ambulance, but the bridge it is on is made of sugar. Starring: Nutty; Featuring: Lumpy and Handy; Moral: "Take the bitter with the sweet!" While Lumpy and Russell go fishing, they find a treasure map. Also discovering it, Lifty and Shifty go after the treasure. Starring: Russell, Lifty and Shifty; Featuring : Lumpy, Disco Bear, Pop and Cub Moral: "There's plenty of fish in the sea!"
4	"Easy for You to Sleigh"	Kenn Navarro, Ken Pontac, and Warren Graff	November 13, 2006
4	"Wishy Washy"	Kenn Navarro, Ken Pontac, and David Ichioka	November 13, 2006
4	"Who's to Flame?"	Kenn Navarro and Ken Pontac	November 13, 2006
Lifty and Shifty try to steal Christmas, but it won't be easy trying to ransack Flippy's home. Starring: Lifty and Shifty; Featuring: Pop, Cub, Mime and Flippy; Moral: "Give until it hurts!" Petunia's toilet is clogged, so Lumpy comes to "fix" it, but only ends up making a bigger mess. Starring: Petunia and Lumpy; Moral: "Wash behind the ears!" Petunia catches fire on her tail while making pancakes. The fire then spreads to Giggles, and then the whole house. Mime calls the firefighters for help, but things do not go well. Starring: Mime; Featuring: Giggles, Petunia, Lumpy, Toothy, Handy, Sniffles, Disco Bear, Russell, Cuddles, and Lifty and Shifty Moral: "If you can't take the heat, stay out of the kitchen!"
5	"Every Litter Bit Hurts"	Kenn Navarro and Ken Pontac	October 17, 2006 (Note: https://web.archive.org/web/20070515071352/http://www.g4tv.com:80/happytreefriends/episodes/6092/6003.html)
5	"As You Wish"	Kenn Navarro and Ken Pontac	October 17, 2006
5	"Take a Hike"	Kenn Navarro and Ken Pontac	October 17, 2006
Giggles confronts Lumpy when she catches him emptying his garbage truck in a lake. She has The Mole, Sniffles, Pop, and Cub clean up his litter, but Lumpy will not stop his dreadful pollution. Starring: Giggles and Lumpy; Featuring: Sniffles, The Mole, Pop and Cub; Moral: "A new broom sweeps clean!" At Petunia's lights store, she throws away a lamp that supposedly doesn't work. When Lifty and Shifty take it from the trash, however, they find that it is a magic lamp with Lumpy the Genie inside. As it is passed between Happy Tree Friends, their wishes result in death. Starring: Lumpy, Lifty and Shifty; Moral: "Be careful what you wish for!" At Petunia's lights store, she throws away a lamp that supposedly doesn't work. When Lifty and Shifty take it from the trash, however, they find that it is a magic lamp with Lumpy the Genie inside. As it is passed between Happy Tree Friends, their wishes result in death. Starring: Lumpy, Lifty and Shifty Moral: "Be careful what you wish for!"
6	"Snow Place to Go"	Kenn Navarro, Ken Pontac, Warren Graff, Aubrey Ankrum, Jeff Biancalana, and David Winn	October 24, 2006 (Note: https://web.archive.org/web/20070304092928/http://www.g4tv.com/happytreefriends/episodes/6107/Snow_Place_to_Go.html)
6	"Dunce Upon a Time"	Kenn Navarro, Ken Pontac, and David Ichioka	October 24, 2006
6	"Gems the Breaks"	Kenn Navarro, Ken Pontac, and David Ichioka	October 24, 2006
The boat catches fire and the Happy Tree Friends are marooned in the Arctic. Meanwhile, they have to escape a killer whale deep below. Starring: Russell; Featuring: Lumpy, Toothy, Cuddles, Flaky, and Giggles; Moral: "A Friend-ship never sinks" Nutty trades his cow to Lifty and Shifty for some magic jelly beans. The next day, he and Giggles' house is in the sky after a beanstalk grew out of Nutty. Giggles meets a giant (played by Lumpy), and must stop him, for he is making food with a nasty recipe. Starring: Giggles; Featuring: Lumpy, Nutty, Handy, Lifty, Shifty, Mime, Cuddles, Flaky, Toothy, Sniffles, and Petunia, with an appearance of a dead Generic Tree Friend; Moral: "The sky's the limit when your heart's in it!" When Splendid attacks Lifty and Shifty, they use Kryptonut as a distraction to make him puke violently and fall sick. Whenever he tries to stop them, he fails because they have the Kryptonut in possession. Starring: Splendid, Lifty and Shifty Moral: "Pressure makes diamonds!"
7	"A Change of Heart"	Kenn Navarro, Ken Pontac, and Warren Graff	November 7, 2006 (A Change of Heart and A Hole Lotta Love) (Note: https://web.archive.org/web/20130808193814/http://www.g4tv.com/happytreefriends/episodes/6152/sight-for-sore-eyes.html); December 3, 2006 (Mime to Five) (Note: https://web.archive.org/web/20061216120146/http://www.g4tv.com/happytreefriends/episodes/6216/Skys_the_Limit.html)
7	"A Hole Lotta Love"	Kenn Navarro, Ken Pontac, and Warren Graff	November 7, 2006 (A Change of Heart and A Hole Lotta Love); December 3, 2006 (Mime to Five)
7	"Mime to Five"	Kenn Navarro, Ken Pontac, and Warren Graff	November 7, 2006 (A Change of Heart and A Hole Lotta Love); December 3, 2006 (Mime to Five)
Disco Bear eats deep fried butter, causing him to suffer a heart attack. Lumpy removes the butter from Disco Bear's heart, but his heartbeat stops. As Giggles pumps life into Disco Bear's body, Lumpy has to find a replacement heart. Starring: Lumpy and Disco Bear; Featuring: Giggles, Cuddles, Petunia and Cro-Marmot; Moral: "Absence makes the heart grow fonder!" When Pop thinks that Cub fell into a well, he enlists the help of Sniffles, Lumpy, and The Mole to rescue him, which leads them through a mayhem-filled adventure. Starring: Pop and Cub, Sniffles; Featuring: Lumpy, Mime, The Mole, Handy, Cuddles, and Petunia; Moral: "Anything worth doing is worth doing well!" Mime wants to buy a unicycle, but he has no money. He tries to find a job to earn money. Starring: Mime; Featuring: Pop, Cub, Russell, Sniffles, Giggles, Disco Bear, Lumpy, Cro-Marmot, Flaky, Toothy, Cuddles, and The Mole Moral: "Keep your nose to the grindstone"
8	"Blast from the Past"	Kenn Navarro, Ken Pontac, and Warren Graff	November 26, 2006 (Blast from the Past and Chew Said a Mouthful) (Note: https://web.archive.org/web/20130808193816/http://www.g4tv.com/happytreefriends/episodes/6194/blast-from-the-past.html); November 19, 2006 (See What Develops) (Note: https://web.archive.org/web/20070114063827/http://www.g4tv.com/happytreefriends/episodes/6178/6008.html)
8	"Chew Said a Mouthful"	Kenn Navarro, Ken Pontac, and Warren Graff	November 26, 2006 (Blast from the Past and Chew Said a Mouthful); November 19, 2006 (See What Develops)
8	"See What Develops"	Kenn Navarro, Ken Pontac, and Warren Graff	November 26, 2006 (Blast from the Past and Chew Said a Mouthful); November 19, 2006 (See What Develops)
Sniffles uses a time machine to help the Happy Tree Friends on the playground. Starring: Sniffles; Featuring: Lumpy, Cuddles, Giggles and Toothy; Moral: "Time heals all wounds!" Nutty tries to eat a jawbreaker, and finds out the reason behind their name. Starring: Nutty and Lumpy; Featuring: Giggles, Toothy, The Mole, Mime, Disco Bear, and Flaky; Moral: "Keep a stiff upper lip!" While The Mole is photographing for the newspaper, Splendid has to save many people who need to be rescued. Starring: Splendid and The Mole; Featuring: Lumpy, Sniffles, Russell, Giggles, Cro-Marmot, Handy, Disco Bear, Flaky, Nutty, Mime, and Petunia Moral: "A picture is worth a thousand words!"
9	"Idol Curiosity"	Ken Pontac, Kenn Navarro, Warren Graff, and David Ichioka	November 19, 2006
9	"Home Is Where the Hurt is"	Kenn Navarro, Ken Pontac, and Warren Graff	November 19, 2006
9	"Aw, Shucks!"	Kenn Navarro, Ken Pontac, and Warren Graff	November 19, 2006
Giggles, Flaky, and Sniffles discover the Cursed Idol, which summons a crack to kill them. Can Sniffles survive the danger? Starring: Sniffles; Featuring: Giggles, Flaky, The Mole, Russell, Lumpy, and Toothy; Moral: "Step on a crack, break your mother's back" Handy fails to build a house for Giggles, so he gets help from his friends. Unbeknownst to them, Lumpy is using the blueprint paper to fold a crane as they create a house for her. Starring: Handy and Giggles; Featuring: Lumpy, Mime, The Mole, Cuddles, and Petunia; Moral: "Charity begins at home" Lumpy's prized corn that he has been raising for years is sabotaged by a crow. He makes many attempts to stop it. Starring: Lumpy; Featuring: Cuddles, Toothy, Giggles, Disco Bear, Nutty, Sniffles, Mime, The Mole, Flaky, and Handy Moral: "Friends are flowers in the garden of life"
10	"A Sight for Sore Eyes"	Ken Pontac, Kenn Navarro, and Warren Graff	November 7, 2006 (A Sight for Sore Eyes); December 10, 2006 (Wipe Out! and Letter Late Than Never) (Note: https://web.archive.org/web/20070109074553/http://www.g4tv.com/happytreefriends/episodes/6250/Letter_Late_Than_Never.html)
10	"Wipe Out"	Kenn Navarro, Ken Pontac and Warren Graff	November 7, 2006 (A Sight for Sore Eyes); December 10, 2006 (Wipe Out! and Letter Late Than Never)
10	"Letter Late Than Never"	Kenn Navarro, Ken Pontac and Warren Graff	November 7, 2006 (A Sight for Sore Eyes); December 10, 2006 (Wipe Out! and Letter Late Than Never)
Lumpy the optometrist prescribes a seeing eye dog for The Mole and contact lens for Russell. Starring: The Mole and Russell; Featuring: Lumpy, Toothy, Sniffles, and Nutty; Moral: "When the outlook isn't good, try the uplook!" Cro-Marmot wants to have the same fame as Lumpy the surfer. Starring: Cro-Marmot and Lumpy; Featuring: The Mole, Flaky, Nutty, Giggles, Petunia, and Handy; Moral: "Don't make waves" Mailman Lumpy tries to deliver mail, but a killer turtle is after him. Starring: Lumpy; Featuring : Giggles, Cuddles, Pop and Cub; Deaths: Giggles, Cub, and Lumpy Moral: "Good things come in small packages!"
11	"Wingin' It"	Ken Pontac, Kenn Navarro, and Warren Graff	December 3, 2006 (Wingin' It and Easy Comb, Easy Go) (Note: https://web.archive.org/web/20061216120146/http://www.g4tv.com/happytreefriends/episodes/6216/Skys_the_Limit.html); December 10, 2006 (Tongue in Cheek)
11	"Tongue in Cheek"	Kenn Navarro, Ken Pontac, and Warren Graff	December 3, 2006 (Wingin' It and Easy Comb, Easy Go); December 10, 2006 (Tongue in Cheek)
11	"Easy Comb, Easy Go"	Kenn Navarro, Ken Pontac, and Warren Graff	December 3, 2006 (Wingin' It and Easy Comb, Easy Go); December 10, 2006 (Tongue in Cheek)
Flaky goes to the airport and has a fear of flying, which she must face in order to save the others from a plane accident. Starring: Flaky; Featuring: Sniffles, Mime, The Mole, Lumpy, Petunia, and Cuddles; Moral: "Look before you leap!" Sniffles attempts to eat his prey, the ants, but they defend themselves against their predator. Starring: Sniffles; Moral: "Don't make a mountain out of an ant-hill!" Disco Bear has a burnt hair strand, but his barber, The Mole, cuts off everything but his sideburns. Now he has to get his hair (and his beloved afro) back or he'll face humiliation. Starring: Disco Bear and Lumpy; Featuring : The Mole, Nutty, Mime, Handy, Pop and Cub; Appearance: Giggles, Petunia, Sniffles, Russell, Lifty and Shifty, Toothy, Cuddles and Flaky; Deaths: Toothy, Nutty, Cub, Handy, and Cuddles Moral: "Don't split hairs!"
12	"I've Got You Under My Skin"	Ken Pontac, Kenn Navarro, and Warren Graff	December 25, 2006
12	"In a Jam"	Kenn Navarro, Ken Pontac, and Warren Graff	December 25, 2006
12	"Junk in the Trunk"	Kenn Navarro, Ken Pontac, and Warren Graff	December 25, 2006
Lumpy and Sniffles find an injured Giggles outside her house. Apparently, she has a bad cold, and Sniffles wants to cure her – but chaos ensues when Lumpy catches the cold and accidentally injects Sniffles into his own body. Starring: Sniffles and Lumpy; Featuring: Giggles; Moral: "It's what inside that counts!" Cuddles auditions to join the Happy Tree Band to replace former member Russell, who has been electrocuted. Despite some difficulties, Cuddles gets the part, but then the real chaos begins during the band's performance. Starring: Cuddles; Featuring: Lumpy, Sniffles, Handy, The Mole, Russell, and Nutty; Moral: "He who pays the piper calls the tune!" Lumpy's beloved pet elephant would not listen to him, while Lifty and Shifty have plans with Lumpy's elephant. Starring: Lumpy; Featuring : Cuddles, Toothy, Lifty and Shifty and Mime Moral: "A bird in the hand is worth two in the bush!"
13	"Hear Today, Gone Tomorrow"	Ken Pontac, Kenn Navarro, and Warren Graff	December 17, 2006 (Note: https://web.archive.org/web/20070109074723/http://www.g4tv.com/happytreefriends/episodes/6303/Ear_Today_Gone_Tomorrow.html)
13	"Double Whammy, Part 1"	Ken Pontac, Kenn Navarro, and Warren Graff	December 17, 2006
13	"Autopsy Turvy (Double Whammy, Part 2)"	Ken Pontac, Kenn Navarro, and Warren Graff	December 17, 2006
Lumpy and Cuddles are playing telephone when Cuddles accidentally causes Lumpy to lose his hearing. Even worse, Flippy is trying to kill Lumpy. Starring: Lumpy; Featuring: Cuddles, Sniffles, The Mole, Russell, Giggles, and Flippy; Moral: "Actions speak louder than words!" Flippy consults Lumpy the psychiatrist upon becoming aware of his flip outs that result in him killing innocent people as victims. But when they keep on happening, Flippy eventually ends up in a heated battle with his evil side, Fliqpy. Starring: Flippy; Featuring: Lumpy, Mime and Nutty Moral: Part 1 "Two heads are better than one" and Part 2 "Two is company, three is a crowd!"

== International broadcast ==
In Canada, Razer aired the show in syndication with then-sibling television system Citytv.

The series has also been broadcast on MTV in Europe and Latin America, and on Animax in South Africa.
