= List of Happy Tree Friends episodes =

Happy Tree Friends is an adult-oriented Flash-animated web series that was created and developed by Rhode Montijo, Kenn Navarro, and Warren Graff for Mondo Media. A total of seven seasons of the series have been released: six seasons on the internet, and one season on television.

In 1999, the crew began the series with a pilot episode titled "Banjo Frenzy", which features a blue dinosaur, a light blue squirrel, a yellow rabbit (Cuddles), and a purple beaver. The first official episode is titled "Spin Fun Knowin' Ya!" which, although it was produced in 1999, was uploaded to the Mondo Media website in December 2000 and featured later versions of the dinosaur (now a moose), rabbit, squirrel, and beaver. From that point on, the writers began introducing new characters to the show. It quickly became an internet phenomenon, receiving millions of views per episode. In 2006, the Happy Tree Friends television series aired on G4 in the United States. It also aired on G4 and Razer in Canada in 2007.

A prequel spin-off called Ka-Pow! debuted in September 2008. In 2010, after airing fifteen episodes for the third web season, a hiatus began, in which only Break shorts were released with a subliminal message at the end of each, reading "Happy Tree Friends is dead!". This situation concerned many fans because they thought that the series had been canceled. The writers confirmed that they were making a joke about the fact that the characters die in the show multiple times, and making a pun with the word "dead". The hiatus ended on December 8, 2011, with the release of the episode "Clause for Concern".

In addition to the show's five seasons and a spin-off, there have been some special episodes and shorts. These include eleven "Smoochies", ten "Kringles", thirteen "Break" shorts, five "Love Bites", and sixteen other irregular episodes that are unindexed. The "Smoochie" shorts involve three different items being dropped next to a main character, only for them to be killed in three different ways, each regarding the item. These have been adapted into the Happy Tree Friends website where one can choose an item to drop. The "Kringle" shorts are Christmas-themed shorts that feature the main characters doing various Christmas-related tasks, only to be killed in various ways. The "Love Bites" were Valentine's Day-themed shorts that went with the basic structure of a Happy Tree Friends episode. The "Break" shorts were produced in 2008, when no new episodes were produced until the following year. A new break short debuted in 2009.

== Series overview ==
Season	Episodes	Originally released		
Season	Episodes	First released	Last released	Network
1	27	December 2000	June 22, 2001	Mondo Media
2	27	September 23, 2002	May 2006	Mondo Media
3	25	October 4, 2007	March 29, 2013	Mondo Media
4	9	June 14, 2013	March 6, 2014	Mondo Media
5	5	December 7, 2016	December 22, 2016	Mondo Media
6	2	March 15, 2026	September 4, 2026	Mondo Media

== Internet shorts ==
=== Season 1 (2000–2001) ===
No. overall	No. in season	Title	Directed by	Written by	Original release date
1	1	"Spin Fun Knowin' Ya!"	Rhode Montijo	Warren Graff	December 11, 2000
Lumpy is spinning a playground merry-go-round as Cuddles, Toothy and Giggles ride it. They tell Lumpy to spin them faster, and Lumpy does so. Suddenly, Toothy flies off and crashes into a tree, breaking his back. The pole Giggles is holding onto breaks off, and she flies right into a tree stump, slicing her body in half as the pole impales her chest. Cuddles' hands rip off from his body and his momentum carries him into the right engine of a parked plane, shredding him to bits. As the merry-go-round comes to a complete stop, Lumpy immediately notices Cuddles' severed hands still clutching onto the pole. He whistles and walks away, trying to look innocent. Moral: "Don't forget to floss!"
2	2	"House Warming"	Rhode Montijo	Rhode Montijo & Kenn Navarro	December 15, 2000
Handy finishes constructing a tree house for Petunia, who becomes thankful and goes to play in her tree house. Handy turns around to leave, but at that exact moment, the tree house catches on fire with Petunia inside. He tells Petunia to jump and he'll catch her, but due to his lack of hands, she falls onto the ground. He sees a hose nearby, but once again his lack of hands fail him. He then sees a bucket and kicks it down towards Petunia, thinking it's water, but is a bucket of petroleum. Handy then has no choice but to stomp the fire out. Petunia, now a blackened and bloody mush, weakly raises her arm and gives an "okay" signal. Moral: "Smiles are always free!"
3	3	"Helping Helps"	Rhode Montijo	Warren Graff, Rhode Montijo & Kenn Navarro	December 22, 2000
Giggles is walking through the forest, with a broken leg. Suddenly, a water dam behind her breaks, and the water is rushing towards her. Splendid hears her call and goes to save her. After the rescue, a branch beheads Giggles. To save face, Splendid replaces her head with an acorn (with a poorly drawn face), and hands Giggles back to her mom. The mom, not noticing anything, picks up Giggles' dead body and hugs it. As Splendid flies off, Giggles' mom bids farewell, still unaware of her daughter's death. Moral: "Don't forget to stop and smell the roses!"
4	4	"Crazy Ant-ics"	Rhode Montijo	Warren Graff, Rhode Montijo & Kenn Navarro	December 29, 2000
Sniffles is walking in the forest, thinking of math equations. He then comes upon an anthill. Fascinated, Sniffles decides to catch some ants to eat. However, the frightened ants hammer a wooden nail down his tongue, trapping him. Then, they scratch it away with a cheese grater, squeeze lemon juice on it, and saw it away with an electric saw. Finally, an ant runs up Sniffles' tongue with a container of gasoline, leaving a trail, and tosses the container of gas into Sniffles' mouth after arriving at the top. One of the ants finishes Sniffles off by using a match to ignite the gas, which rapidly rides up Sniffles' tongue, and when the flame reaches Sniffles' face, his whole upper body explodes, scattering his body all over the place. The ants start cheering at their victory. Moral: "Buckle up for safety!"
5	5	"Havin' a Ball"	Rhode Montijo	Mark Fiorenza, Warren Graff, Rhode Montijo & Kenn Navarro	January 5, 2001
Pop and Cub are playing catch with a ball, but then Pop throws too hard, sending the ball to land on the opposite side of a busy street. Not wanting to disappoint Cub, Pop has no choice but to cross the road to retrieve the ball. Though severely injured, Pop successfully retrieves the ball. However, when he takes one step forward, he suddenly begins falling down a cliff. As he falls, a medical helicopter with Lumpy in the gurney is just beneath him. Pop gets sliced and shredded apart by the helicopter's rotor blades. Cub, who successfully climbed down the cliff, retrieves his ball. But once he grabs it, the gurney Lumpy was on disconnects from the helicopter, and lands on top of Cub, followed by Lumpy getting crushed by the helicopter. Moral: "Eat your veggies!"
6	6	"Water You Wading For?"	Rhode Montijo	Mark Fiorenza, Warren Graff, Rhode Montijo, Kenn Navarro & Paul Allan	February 23, 2001
Cuddles jumps into a small pond, having a relaxing swim. Cuddles tells Flaky to join in, but Flaky refuses, pointing to a "No Swimming" sign. After Cuddles encourages her to jump in again, he starts getting attacked by a bunch of piranhas, gets tossed around like a beach ball by 2 sea lions and eaten by an alligator, but manages to escape its mouth. And after he escapes the pond, he gets crushed by a whale, all the while Flaky fails to save her friend. Moral: "Don't breathe under water!"
7	7	"Nuttin' Wrong with Candy"	Rhode Montijo	Rhode Montijo & Kenn Navarro	January 12, 2001
Nutty rips off a lollipop stuck to his head, and consumes it in one bite. He starts to get a sugar rush, but his vibrations cause the other candies stuck to his body to fall off, much to his dismay. He sees a vending machine nearby and puts a coin in it. However, the candy he wants becomes stuck. Determined, Nutty slides his hand through the slot to get his treat, only to have his arm ripped off. He starts rocking the machine back and forth, causing it to fall forward, trapping him inside. Despite being trapped, Nutty is able to eat a chocolate bar. However, the coils spin close to Nutty, killing him off-screen. Moral: "Wash behind your ears!"
8	8	"Wheelin' and Dealin'"	Rhode Montijo	Mark Fiorenza, Warren Graff, Rhode Montijo & Kenn Navarro	January 26, 2001
Lumpy and Handy are prepared for a race, but Lifty and Shifty are not. It turns out their kart is lacking tires and a steering wheel. They steal the wheels of Lumpy's cart, causing it to fall to the ground and catch fire. During the race, they steal Handy's steering wheel, causing him to crash into an ambulance and lose his lower half. In the lead, the two raccoons laugh at their victory, but then all four wheels fall off, causing their kart to fall on its side, and scraping their bodies away against the pavement. Somehow, Lumpy wins the race despite having no wheels. Moral: "Look both ways before crossing the street!"
9	9	"Pitchin' Impossible"	Rhode Montijo	Mark Fiorenza, Warren Graff, Rhode Montijo & Kenn Navarro	January 19, 2001
Petunia is playing at Lumpy's carnival stand, throwing baseballs to knock down bottles. The Mole hears the noise from the booth and decides to give it a try. Lumpy notices that The Mole is blind, but lets him play anyway. He throws the 1st ball, and it bounces around the booth without hitting any bottles. Eventually, the ball knocks down both of the support beams holding the window of the booth, causing the window to chop off the top of Petunia's head. The Mole throws the next ball, oblivious to the fact the window is closed. The ball bounces off the wall and hits the lever of a Ferris wheel, and the Ferris Wheel comes off its hinges and rolls towards the booth, slicing Lumpy vertically in half. The Mole gets a blood-splattered teddy bear, which he hugs. Moral: "Take your vitamins!"
10	10	"Stayin' Alive"	Rhode Montijo	Mark Fiorenza, Warren Graff, Rhode Montijo & Kenn Navarro	February 2001
Petunia and Giggles are having a tea party. Suddenly, Disco Bear interrupts them with his dance moves. Despite his smooth moves, the 2 girls are unimpressed. Disco Bear grabs Giggles' hand and begins dancing with her. But when Disco Bear gives Giggles a big twirl, she suddenly slams head-first on her tea kettle. Giggles begins screaming in agony while jumping and waving her arms in pain. Disco Bear thinks Giggles is doing a new dance, and he begins to mimic her. The same happens to Petunia, who had bumped into an electric fence, electrocuting her, and her body movements mimic a robot, with Disco Bear dancing along. The 2 girls are now dead, with Disco Bear oblivious to what happened. Moral: "An apple a day keeps the doctor away!"
11	11	"Treasure Those Idol Moments (Note: Alternatively referred to as "Treasure These Idol Moments", or just "Idol Moments".)"	Rhode Montijo	Mark Fiorenza, Warren Graff, Rhode Montijo & Kenn Navarro	March 9, 2001
Toothy is swinging on the swing. Suddenly, he falls off and lands on his teeth. He sees the Cursed Idol on the ground and picks it up. But then the swing comes back and rams the back of his head, killing him. Elsewhere, Sniffles is playing in the sandbox when the Curse Idol lands next to him. He picks it up, but the sand turns into quicksand, causing Sniffles to sink. Cub reaches the bottom of the slide, and the Idol lands in his hands, causing him to be crushed by a rock at the top of the slide. Flaky is swinging on the monkey bars and the Idol lands in her hands, causing her to get hit by Lumpy's car, followed by Lumpy dying in a car crash off-screen. Moral: "If friends were flowers, I'd pick you!"
12	12	"Chip Off the Ol' Block"	Rhode Montijo	Warren Graff, Rhode Montijo & Kenn Navarro	March 23, 2001
Pop is relaxing on a hammock while Cub is mowing the yard with a lawnmower. Cub unknowingly rides the mower over a brick, making him stop in his tracks. Realizing this, Cub looks under the mower and finds the brick lodged between the blades. Cub then attempts to pull the brick out, even though he forgets to turn the mower off. Luckily, Pop wakes up and witnesses this. Over the fear of his son getting injured, Pop snatches Cub just before something bad could've happened. Pop places Cub on his hammock, and orders him to stay. Pop looks under the mower, and pulls out the brick. Pop then proceeds to mow the rest of the lawn himself, with Cub watching. An oblivious Pop starts pushing the mower right towards pieces of broken glass and syringes that are scattered all over the ground. The mower runs over the sharp objects, and they get flung out of the ejection port at full speed right towards Cub. The sharp objects then pierce Cub all over his body and is finally killed when a broken bottle flies through his head, taking away a part of his skull, as well as his brain. Cub's now dead body falls right into a nearby pile of leaves, which cover up his entire body. Pop then comes in, raking some leaves with a rake. Stopping for a second, he lights up a match to restart his pipe. Once his pipe is lit once more, he unknowingly throws the still-lit match at the leaf pile where Cub fell in, setting it on fire. Moral: "Plant kindness and gather love!"
13	13	"Nuttin' But the Tooth"	Rhode Montijo	Mark Fiorenza, Warren Graff, Rhode Montijo & Kenn Navarro	April 2001
Nutty is a patient of Toothy the dentist. Toothy is reading a dentistry instruction book prior to performing Nutty's checkup, before ensuring Nutty that the operation will go smoothly. As Nutty's mouth opens wide, Toothy comes across a cavity that needs to be removed, so he tries to drill out the tooth. When Toothy is drilling, the drill's battery goes dead, much to his disappointment. However, Toothy managed to get another battery. Unfortunately, he only succeeds in drilling a hole in the back of Nutty's throat and through the headrest of the chair. Next, Toothy tries the old-fashioned method of tying one end of a string around Nutty's tooth, and the other end to a doorknob. Toothy rings a doorbell on a trailer, and Lumpy answers the door, causing Nutty's jaw to get ripped from his head. Nutty's rotten tooth is one of only a few teeth that are not torn out. Before the episode ends, however, the rotten tooth falls out on its own, finally completing the operation. Moral: "Brush after every meal!"
14	14	"Hide and Seek"	Rhode Montijo	Warren Graff, Rhode Montijo & Kenn Navarro	May 2001
Toothy, Flaky and Petunia are playing a friendly game of hide and seek in the woods with Flippy. Flippy begins counting, while the others run to hide. As Flippy continues to count, a woodpecker behind him begins pecking at the tree it's perching on. The sound of the woodpecker's pecking causes Flippy to act all scared. Just seconds later, Flippy thinks of these sounds as a machine gun being fired, and he starts to act all viciously as if he's back in a war. Once Flippy flips out, he triggered PTSD and becoming mutilated, and becomes his altered ego, Fliqpy, he throws a knife through the woodpecker's chest, killing it. At Toothy's hiding spot, behind a tree, Toothy giggles while hiding. Fliqpy, in camouflage to the tree behind Toothy, grabs Toothy's head and gives it a big twist, which snaps his neck. Elsewhere, a panting Flaky continues to look for her hiding spot. Suddenly, a piano wire comes down and it snatches Flaky by her neck, which strangles her to death. Petunia, having witnessed Flaky's death, begins to back away in fear while whimpering. Petunia then trips and falls into a Punji stake pit. As Petunia yells in pain by being pierced all over her body, Fliqpy arrives. Petunia struggles to lift her arm and hopes that Flippy will grab her hand to pull her out. Fliqpy instead gives Petunia an activated grenade. Seeing what Flippy gave her, Petunia screams in horror. She dies off-screen. Moral: "After the rain comes a rainbow!"
15	15	"Whose Line Is It Anyway?"	Rhode Montijo	Warren Graff, Rhode Montijo & Kenn Navarro	September 17, 2002
Russell is fishing on a pier while enjoying a bucket full of mussels and clams. He is oblivious to the fact that inside the bucket is a pufferfish. After Russell devours a clam happily, he unknowingly picks up the puffer fish. Moments later, Russell's fishing line begins unreeling, meaning that a fish is caught in his line. Delighted upon noticing this, Russell devours the puffer fish and begins reeling in his catch. Suddenly, the puffer fish puffs up in his throat, cutting off his air. Not long after that, Russell's fishing line breaks apart. The pirate attempts to reel in his catch by pulling his line, but the wire is so sharp, it cuts off both of his hands. Still determined, Russell grabs the fishing line with his teeth. Despite getting a small cut on his upper lip, Russell manages to reel in his catch with one tug. Unfortunately, the fish that caught Russell's line was a swordfish, which comes towards Russell at full speed, and impales Russell's head through his mouth, killing him instantly. Moral: "Adopt a pet!"
16	16	"Boo Do You Think You Are?"	Rhode Montijo	Mark Fiorenza, Warren Graff, Rhode Montijo & Kenn Navarro	April 19, 2001
Giggles, Sniffles, and Flaky all jump into a cart, apparently excited for something, though Flaky is characteristically nervous about it. Then it reveals that they are entering a haunted house ride at the carnival. When they enter the building, Sniffles gets startled by a hand that pops out of a coffin and chuckles. Suddenly, it grabs Sniffles' head, and gives it a hard scratch, cutting up his head and revealing his brain. Giggles screams in terror, she starts whimpering and can barely look away from Sniffles' corpse. Giggles does not notice that their cart is approaching an axe swinging back and forth. Flaky tries to warn Giggles, but is still traumatized and does not move. As a result, she gets sliced in half. Flaky screams in horror and backs into a corner, when suddenly a suspended cauldron fills the cart with lava up to Flaky's waist. In pain, she jumps out of the cart, now with her lower body reduced to a skeleton, screaming at the top of her lungs. She falls onto the floor, and the cart tips over, burning the rest of her body excluding the top of her head, and then her lower jaw falls off. Moral: "Don't take candy from strangers!"
17	17	"Mime and Mime Again"	Rhode Montijo	Mark Fiorenza, Warren Graff, Rhode Montijo & Kenn Navarro	February 2001
Toothy is sitting in a hospital bed, covered in bandages from head to toe. Moments later, Mime holds a balloon animal in front of Toothy, surprising him. As Mime begins juggling some balls, Toothy begins giggling at Mime's silly antics. Mime then pretends that a bandage on Toothy's leg is a cobra rising out of its basket. Toothy finds it funny, that is until the bandage gets snagged into a desk fan next to his bed. His leg snaps in half, causing him to scream in pain. As Mime hears the poor beaver's cries of pain, he proceeds to help by rubbing his wound with rubbing alcohol. While attempting to make the rubbing alcohol come out of its container, Mime accidentally splashes the liquid onto Toothy's wound, which only intensifies his pain. With Toothy wriggling and shaking his body in pain, Mime proceeds to re-position his leg. When Mime finally gets his leg back in place, Toothy stops screaming. Mime gives a silent sigh of relief and turns the fan back on to cool down. However, the bandage is still stuck in the blades, and instead of snapping his leg in half, Toothy starts to get pulled in. Toothy begins to scream as his body starts getting sliced into pieces by the fan. Mime looks away from the grueling scene as Toothy's blood and body parts scatter all over the room. Seeing the destruction around him, Mime begins pulling on an invisible rope to leave the scene. Moral: "Silence is golden!"
18	18	"You're Bakin' Me Crazy"	Rhode Montijo	Mark Fiorenza, Warren Graff, Rhode Montijo & Kenn Navarro	April 2001
In his trailer, Lumpy is preparing for a birthday party, ironing his shirt with only a towel wrapped around his waist and is otherwise nude. Leaving the iron pressed down on his shirt, Lumpy then moves over to a mixer where he begins making a cake. He is interrupted by the doorbell. He answers the door to find Giggles in a Girl Scout outfit selling cookies. A gust of wind blows Lumpy's towel off his body, exposing his private area to Giggles. Lumpy doesn't notice this as he ponders whether or not to buy some cookies, but Giggles catches a disturbing eyeful of his privates and shrieks in complete shock, bringing Lumpy back to reality. Lumpy panics and begins to look around for something to cover his nudity. When he looks back, Lumpy sees smoke coming from the iron and his shirt. He runs to the iron, but he trips over the many cords plugged into an overloaded electrical socket. He accidentally flips the ironing board over, causing the iron to fly onto Giggles' face, burning it. While struggling to put his shirt on, Lumpy's arm accidentally hits his still-activated mixer, which flies through the air and lands in Giggles' eye sockets, shredding her eye sockets, and making her scream in agony. The mixer eventually falls out of Giggles' head, along with a large quantity of her blood and both of her eyeballs, still intact. A knock at a door is heard, and Petunia answers it; revealing it's her birthday, and Lumpy stands at the door. He still has his shirt over his head. Lumpy presents the cake he made to Petunia, which is covered in blood. Moral: "Watch a sunrise!"
19	19	"Tongue Twister Trouble"	Rhode Montijo	Mark Fiorenza, Warren Graff, Rhode Montijo & Kenn Navarro	April 3, 2001
The Happy Tree Friends are enjoying a day of ice skating. Sniffles seems to have some trouble with his footing. As he gets a good balance, an ant skates by. Fascinated, Sniffles proceeds to eat the ant. As he launches his tongue, his tongue misses the ant and instead hits the ice. Sniffles attempts to pull his tongue off the ice, but as he does so, he tears off the skin on the bottom of his tongue. The ants now use this as an opportunity to get back at Sniffles. First, they throw a toy mouse on Sniffles' tongue, and one of the ants releases a cat. The cat quickly jumps on Sniffles' tongue. The cat finds Sniffles' tongue so comfortable and kneads it, making Sniffles shout in pain. Behind Sniffles, one of the ants ties a rope to Sniffles' tail, another ant is seen holding a bottle of wine. The ant swings it at an anvil, which is also tied to the rope. The anvil begins to sink into a hole in the ice. As the anvil sinks down, Sniffles is about to get pulled in as well. Luckily for him, his tongue is the only thing not making him fall in completely. Unfortunately, the cat claws at Sniffles' tongue, slicing it off in one swing. With his tongue severed, Sniffles starts sliding into the hole, up until Sniffles sinks completely. Seconds after falling into the ice-cold water, Sniffles re-submerges, now encased in a block of ice. Moral: "Mind your manners!"
20	20	"Meat Me for Lunch"	Rhode Montijo	Mark Fiorenza, Warren Graff, Rhode Montijo & Kenn Navarro	April 11, 2001
Hungry, Lifty and Shifty open their refrigerator, only to find it empty. Initially saddened, they come up with a plan to get some food. Lifty and Shifty exit Lumpy's butcher shop with armfuls of meat, while Lumpy chases after and yells at them holding a toilet plunger. A chain of sausage gets stuck in the automatic door, however, and Lifty and Shifty are yanked back into the store. Shifty gets slammed into a wall and is slowly fed into a meat grinder, which grinds him into sausage. Lifty lands against a rack of sharp objects, which fall as he slides down the wall. Several knives and forks pierce his legs and one of his arms. As he tries to remove these objects, he realizes he's sitting on a meat slicer. Thin, circular portions of his body are sliced as he screams in pain. Later, Lumpy is standing behind his counter as Petunia enjoys a green hot dog. Petunia seems to be enjoying her raccoon-meat hot dog until she sticks out her tongue, which is holding an eyeball, surprising Lumpy. Moral: "Read a book!"
21	21	"Sweet Ride"	Rhode Montijo	Mark Fiorenza, Warren Graff, Rhode Montijo, Kenn Navarro & Paul Allan	May 2001
Cuddles is standing next to an ice cream truck, ready to receive a strawberry ice cream cone. After receiving his ice cream, Cuddles tosses his skateboard to the ground, and jumps on it, riding away. Behind some trees lies Nutty, who quickly catches a glimpse of Cuddles' ice cream cone. As Cuddles continues to ride, Nutty begins to chase him on his scooter. Cuddles then notices Nutty following him and screams in shock at the realization. After Cuddles and Nutty ride down a small hill, Cuddles yells in panic when he realizes that a chopped-down tree is blocking the road. Luckily, there's a small wooden plank which acts as a ramp. Cuddles rides up the ramp, successfully dodging a beehive above him. When Cuddles lands on the floor, Nutty's scooter catches up to him, but Nutty isn't on it. Nutty didn't quite manage to dodge the beehive, and now he has his whole head stuck inside. Nutty begins to scream in panic as the bees viciously attack him. A portion of the beehive falls off, which shows Nutty's face covered in bee stings. Blood pours out of his mouth. Cuddles lets out a sigh of relief, as he is no longer being chased, and he puts his focus on his ice cream. However, Cuddles quickly discovers a small staircase. Before Cuddles gets the chance to do something, he trips, his entire body is sliced by the three steps, and the top half of his head scrapes across the pavement. Moral: "Don't jaywalk!"
22	22	"It's a Snap"	Rhode Montijo	Mark Fiorenza, Warren Graff, Rhode Montijo, Kenn Navarro & Paul Allan	May 2001
Splendid is hard at work knitting a blanket until he hears Lumpy's screams, Splendid abandons his work and flies off to investigate. Splendid arrives and discovers that Lumpy has bear traps clamped all over his body, apparently allured by the blocks of cheese each trap held. Splendid looks at the bear trap clamping on his right arm and attempts to open it so he can get it off of him. Unfortunately, the bear trap slips from his hands and it clamps down on his arm, causing his arm to fall off, and a large quantity of blood to pour out. This makes Splendid gasp in sheer shock, and Lumpy to scream in pain. Acting quickly, he ties the severed arm like a balloon knot to stop the blood from spilling out, saving and calming Lumpy down. Splendid comes up with an easier idea to get the bear traps off of Lumpy: he karate chops them off. With all the bear traps off of Lumpy, Splendid gathers them up, and hurls them far away. Somewhere else, Cub is shown playing with his toys. The bear traps come down. One lands on the ground, another pinches down on his ball, and the last one falls on Cub's head, providing a gruesome death for the poor baby. Lumpy shakes hands with Splendid for the help, and Splendid flies off, where Lumpy bids him farewell. Not long after his departure, Splendid hears a loud snap, forcing him to stop and look. It turns out that Lumpy has fallen victim for another bear trap, way larger than the other ones and clamping on almost his entire body. Sighing out of exhaustion, he resorts to using his laser vision to cut the bear trap. Satisfied that he got the job done, Splendid flies away. Unfortunately, not only has Splendid cut the bear trap into pieces, but he unknowingly decapitated Lumpy in the process. Lumpy's severed head slips off from his body and lands on one last bear trap. The iris then closes in on a block of cheese, the item Lumpy tried so hard to acquire. Moral: "You don't need a reason to send flowers!"
23	23	"Off the Hook"	Rhode Montijo	Mark Fiorenza, Warren Graff, Rhode Montijo, Kenn Navarro & Paul Allan	February 9, 2001
While Russell is diving for oysters, an anchor lands on top of him, dazing him. The anchor belongs to Lumpy, who is enjoying a day of fishing. Russell is dazed after moving out from under the anchor and soon finds Lumpy's fishing hook right in front of his face. One of his eyelids gets caught by the hook, and Lumpy, thinking he has caught a fish, begins to reel Russell in. As a panicked Russell gets dragged through the ocean, an electric eel attaches to Russell's body and shocks him repeatedly. Russell is then pulled through sharp coral, which removes the eel from Russell's body but severely cuts him. Russell then finds himself maneuvering through a series of naval mines. He finally hits one, but it does not detonate, much to Russell's relief. Feeling the resistance, Lumpy gives his fishing pole another yank, causing the mine to explode. Russell's body parts fly past an oblivious Lumpy. Finally, Lumpy reels in his catch, only to find Russell's eye. Before the episode ends, the eye falls off of the hook. Moral: "Don't litter!"
24	24	"Spare Me"	Rhode Montijo	Mark Fiorenza, Warren Graff, Rhode Montijo, Kenn Navarro & Paul Allan	June 2001
While bowling, Handy manages to knock down nine pins, leaving one pin standing which does not seem to satisfy him. He angrily walks away as Sniffles steps up for his turn. Sniffles has difficulty lifting his ball, so he lifts it by sucking it onto his nose. He spins around to put some force behind his throw, but unfortunately, the weight of the bowling ball causes his head to fly off his body. His head manages to knock all of the pins over, and his snout is hacked off by the pin clearer, exposing his teeth. As the pin clearer sends Sniffles' severed head back down the ball return, The Mole, unaware of what just happened, assumes that Sniffles' head is his bowling ball and jabs his fingers through Sniffles' eyes, shattering his glasses. The Mole begins slipping on Sniffles' blood and unknowingly spins around as he throws Sniffles' head away from the pins. Over at the snack bar, Handy irately sips on a soda through a straw. When he's out of soda, he looks closely at the neck of the bottle, only to have Sniffles' head hit the back of his head. Handy jerks back his head in anguish as the bottle is now lodged into one of his eye sockets. Inside the bottle, Handy's eye rattles around. His nubs try in vain to remove the bottle from his head, but unfortunately, all he can do is scream in pain. Moral: "Laughter is the best medicine!"
25	25	"Snow What? That's What!"	Rhode Montijo	Mark Fiorenza, Warren Graff, Rhode Montijo, Kenn Navarro & Paul Allan	March 16, 2001
Giggles is building a snowman on a snowy day when suddenly, she gets hit on the back of the head by a snowball. She turns around to find Cro-Marmot standing next to her with a stack of snowballs at his side. Giggles says hello to him and decides to play along. She makes a snowball and throws it at Cro-Marmot. Unfortunately, the amount of pressure causes Cro-Marmot to slide down a nearby cliff. Realizing this, Giggles screams in horror and runs down to stop him. Down the cliff, Petunia can be seen making a snow angel, when suddenly, Cro-Marmot slides by and runs over her. This causes Petunia's lower body to rip off, leaving only her upper body intact. Giggles then comes by and quickly runs over her remains. Further down the slope, Lumpy can be seen relaxing on a hammock, apparently getting his holidays mixed up when he's wearing beach attire. Cro-Marmot slides by, and causes his hammock to wrap around him tightly, squeezing out a large quantity of blood. When Giggles passes by, she unravels the hammock and when it opens, a mangled-up Lumpy begins to groan in pain. Giggles manages to catch up with Cro-Marmot and screams in horror when she realizes that Cro-Marmot is heading straight towards a tree. Running at full speed, she moves right in front of Cro-Marmot just before hitting the tree. Giggles gives a big sigh of relief, and laughs it off when suddenly, some snow falls on top of her nose. She looks up to find icicles about to melt off. Giggles screams, as two average-sized icicles impale her eyes, and a third, rather large icicle crushes her entire forehead. As she still stands, Cro-Marmot throws one last snowball at her. Moral: "Never eat the last cookie!"
26	26	"This Is Your Knife"	Rhode Montijo	Mark Fiorenza, Warren Graff, Rhode Montijo, Kenn Navarro & Paul Allan	March 2, 2001
On a clear, starlit night in the middle of the woods, Cuddles, Giggles, and Flaky are sitting around a campfire, apparently on a camping trip. Cuddles watches the fire, Giggles eats a sandwich, and Flaky roasts marshmallows on a stick. Moments later, Flippy walks by, and the gang greets him. Cuddles then encourages Flippy to take a seat and enjoy the fire. However, the moment Flippy sits down and begins to warm his hands with the fire, some sparks fly out, and nearly hit Flippy. Flippy stares into the fire, and since this bright energy reminds Flippy of the war, Flippy emerges into his evil side, Fliqpy. Seeing Flippy flip out, due to his PTSD and being mutilated, Cuddles laughs nervously and says hello to Fliqpy again in hopes that he will turn back into Flippy. Unfortunately, Flippy's evil side still remains, Fliqpy jumps through the campfire and slashes Cuddles' face away with a rock, knocking out two of his teeth as well as one of his eyes. Giggles, who is still eating her sandwich, gets Cuddles' blood splattered all over her body, making her scream in shock. As Cuddles sits on the ground, dead, Fliqpy uses his Bowie knife to cut a large hole on Cuddles' stomach and pulls out Cuddles' intestines. Fliqpy then uses these intestines to snag Giggles by her neck, and he continuously yanks on the intestines up to the point where Giggles gets strangled to death. Flaky, having witnessed Cuddles and Giggles' deaths, lets out a shriek of panic and takes cover in her sleeping bag. As Flaky hugs her knees in fear inside her sleeping bag, she notices that she is getting lifted into the air. Outside, it turns out that Fliqpy is raising Flaky into the air. Fliqpy lets out an evil chuckle and tosses Flaky's bag into the campfire. Flaky begins to scream loudly as the fire slowly burns her body. Fliqpy then begins to laugh evilly, just before bringing out some marshmallows on a stick, and holding it over the fire, not caring about Flaky's screams of pain. Moral: "Plant a tree!"
27	27	"Happy Trails" (Part 1)	Rhode Montijo	Mark Fiorenza, Warren Graff, Rhode Montijo, Kenn Navarro & Paul Allan	June 2001
The characters are riding in a school bus, and having a lot of fun. Petunia needs to use the bathroom and asks the driver, Lumpy, to stop the bus. Lumpy orders her to sit back down. While doing so, the bus runs over a bump in the road. A window closes while Cuddles is leaning out of it, slicing Cuddles in half. The bus hits another bump just as Mime tosses a peanut up into his mouth, causing him to choke. Mime fails to get a napping Sniffles' attention, so he tries waving to Lumpy for help. Not noticing that Mime is choking, Lumpy gets up from the driver's seat while the bus is still in motion and reprimands Mime for causing a disturbance. As Mime suffocates, Petunia warns Lumpy that the bus is headed for a cliff. Lumpy and Petunia embrace each other in fear as Petunia urinates herself all over the floor in fright. The bus runs over the Cursed Idol, which causes Petunia to lose her balance and fall on the gear lever of the bus, impaling herself. Lumpy tries to shift gears, but only causes Petunia more injury. As Lumpy is unable to stop or even slow the bus, it flies off the cliff, hitting two birds, flinging Toothy out the window, and leaving the rest of the characters' fates ambiguous. Moral: "Keep your promises!"

=== Season 2 (2002–2006) ===
No. overall	No. in season	Title	Directed by	Written by	Original release date
28	1	"Jumping the Shark" (Happy Trails: Part 2)	Rhode Montijo	Mark Fiorenza, Warren Graff, Rhode Montijo, Kenn Navarro & Paul Allan	September 23, 2002
After the events of the previous episode, the survivors are stranded on a deserted island. The bus is in shambles, the ocean is shark-infested, and many have died in the accident. Flippy creates small graves for those who died in the crash, while the others look on mournfully. The next day, Giggles happily catches a fish in the ocean for food, using a long pointed stick as a makeshift spear. A jellyfish swims by and zaps her left foot, causing her to shriek in pain and curiously observe the bump on her foot. Later that day; during the night, Giggles is suffering from extreme chills, wrapped in a blanket, and her stung foot is incredibly swollen before she dies from the jellyfish sting. The scene cuts to Flippy sadly pounding down another grave with Giggles' bow tied around it, indicating that she died of hypothermia. When Flippy is done pounding in Giggles' grave, Lifty and Shifty reveal they have an inflatable raft the group can escape on. As the group sails away from the island as Lifty and Shifty paddle with their hands, everyone is relieved and in good spirits. Unfortunately, as Flaky sits down, her quills pop the raft, causing the raft to start sinking as a shark swims along. The group hurriedly swims back to the island, but Lifty and Shifty are taken and eaten by the shark. As everybody catches their breath, Flaky looks on nervously at her fellow members, all livid that she popped their only ride home. As the scene changes to night, Flippy pounds one more grave into the sand with a crazed expression and equally manic laughter, while the others watch in the background with the same glares they cast earlier, implying they ganged up to murder Flaky. The next day, the school bus and the tree on the island are gone and in their place stands a rocket ship made up of the bus parts. The group boards their creation with makeshift helmets made of coconuts and they lift off, though eventually the rocket stops moving upwards. They throw several weighty objects out of the rocket, one of which being Lumpy, and the rocket continues upwards. Unfortunately, now the rocket moves too fast and it is headed towards the sun. Sniffles' brain explodes as they get closer to the sun, while Handy and Flippy suffer from second and/or third-degree burns. At that time Lumpy is on Earth and makes the best of his situation by relaxing in a chair and holding his sock over a fire. A "puff!" suddenly appears in the sun, indicating that the rocket ship made contact with the sun, without Lumpy even noticing. As the episode ends, Lumpy begins applying sunscreen to his arm. Moral: "Give but never give up!"
29	2	"Eye Candy"	Rhode Montijo	Warren Graff, Rhode Montijo & Kenn Navarro	February 3, 2003
Toothy is cheerfully running through the forest, holding a large yellow lollipop in front of him. His happiness ends soon as he trips over a log, causing the lollipop to get lodged in his eye socket. Screaming, he pulls on the lollipop's stick, causing his eye and the optic nerve, still connected to his head, to fly out of his eye socket and get tangled around a tree branch. Toothy tries pulling on his optic nerve but fails to get his eyeball down from the branch. Whining and wailing in pain, he begins climbing the tree. When he reaches the branch his eyeball is resting on, we get a view of how difficult it is for Toothy to see with both of his eyes pointed in different directions. Toothy reaches for his eye, but unfortunately, a woodpecker lands on the branch and starts pecking his eyeball. Recoiling from the pain, Toothy loses his balance and falls off the tree, which is revealed to have been located on the edge of a cliff, causing Toothy to dangle from the branch of a tree off a cliff from only his optic nerve (which acts as a bungee cord). Toothy tries climbing back up his optic nerve, but he loses his grip and slides down again. Ultimately, Toothy's brain is pulled out from his eye socket, followed by his other eye as Toothy falls to the ground a few feet below him. Before the episode ends, the Woodpecker defecates on Toothy's head. Moral: "Keep your eye on the prize!"
30	3	"Rink Hijinks"	Rhode Montijo	Mark Fiorenza, Warren Graff, Rhode Montijo, Kenn Navarro, Paul Allan & Jessica Teach	March 2003
Flaky enters a roller skating rink, but she seems to have some trouble with her footing. Flaky nearly falls over, and she hugs the wall for safety. But when someone quickly skates past Flaky, she gets filled with determination and lets go of the wall. Flaky begins to get the hang of it, but not for long, as Disco Bear skates in and carelessly pushes Flaky aside. Elsewhere in the rink, Lumpy is seen cleaning the rink with a floor buffer in his underwear. Suddenly, Flaky comes by, and she falls under Lumpy's floor buffer. As Flaky gets sucked in, her body begins rubbing against the floor at a fast speed that kills her, and soon her quills begin to fly all over the place. As Disco Bear skates along, Flaky's quills suddenly come in and puncture Disco Bear all over his face and torso, which kills him. Meanwhile, Lumpy can no longer contain the malfunctioning buffer, and the brushes get cemented to the floor. Because of this, Lumpy is now getting twirled all over the place just before he gets flung away. At the arcade of the rink, Cub can be seen playing at a claw machine. Suddenly, Lumpy comes in and his body crashes through the machine. As a dazed Lumpy regains consciousness, he notices the claw machine's hook hovering over his body. It comes down, punctures his chest, and pulls out his heart. As Lumpy screams at the loss of his heart, he suddenly passes out and dies. Lumpy's heart falls into the prize slot, and Cub immediately grabs it. At first, Cub seems confused by his "prize," but once it throbs, Cub gets fascinated and hugs it. Moral: "What goes around comes around!"
31	4	"Flippin' Burgers"	Rhode Montijo	Warren Graff, Rhode Montijo & Kenn Navarro	April 22, 2003
At a small burger joint in the middle of the woods, the Happy Tree Friends enjoy lunch. Petunia is hard at work cooking the burgers, while Cuddles and Giggles are eating together. Cuddles tries to squirt some ketchup on their fries, but he accidentally squirts it on Giggles. At just that moment, a happy and hungry Flippy opens the door. He sees Giggles covered in ketchup and suddenly goes into a trance. Though Cuddles and Giggles laugh about the incident, Flippy believes that she has been injured, causing him to react and as a result, he sees Giggles covered with ketchup as blood all around her in the background as Flippy flips out and shows his scary, evil face at the audience, now turned into Fliqpy. Fliqpy jumps over to their table and flips it over, causing fries to fly everywhere. Cuddles turns his attention to Fliqpy, but he doesn't seem too worried as he continues sipping on his drink through a straw. Fliqpy grabs Cuddles' straw and uses it to stab him in the heart. Blood starts pouring out of the straw and, in a panic, Cuddles drinks his blood through the straw to get the blood back into his body, but this doesn't work, and he soon dies. Giggles screams and looks around the room, having lost sight of Fliqpy. He emerges above her and shoves a ketchup bottle in one of her ears and a mustard bottle in the other. He squeezes both bottles as hard as he can, causing ketchup and mustard to pour out of her nose, killing her. Next, Fliqpy goes behind the grill where Petunia is standing. He grabs her by the back of the head with her screaming and shoves her face down on the burger grill, causing her to scream in anguish. Laughing, he pulls her head up and we see that the grease has melted her face onto the grill, exposing the nerves of her face. As Petunia is still screaming, Fliqpy shoves her face back onto the grill, burning the exposing nerves of her face with her screaming. Outside the building, Petunia is heard screaming but stops (indicating that she had died). Pop and Cub get ready to enter. Before they can open the door, however, the front of the building explodes, crushing the two beneath the door. Fliqpy lands on the ground, just before the fries. Seeing a pool of Cuddles' blood, Fliqpy grabs a fry and dips it in the blood, mistaking it for ketchup. Fliqpy eats the fry and sighs contently upon tasting the blood. Moral: "You are what you eat!"
32	5	"Get Whale Soon"	Rhode Montijo	Warren Graff, Rhode Montijo & Kenn Navarro	May 2003
Russell happily sits in his boat, humming and holding a harpoon. As he looks through his telescope, he realizes he's floating in the open mouth of a giant whale. Having no time to react, Russell gets eaten, plunging him into darkness. Inside the whale with darkness surrounding him, Russell lights a match to light up his surroundings. He finds a road-raged Lumpy sitting in his car and honking his horn, unaware that he is in a whale's stomach. Lumpy turns on his car's headlights and they both see that they have no way out. Russell, however, gets an idea. They bundle some sticks together and Russell pulls out a box of matches. Looking inside, they see there's only one match left. After several unsuccessful attempts, Russell manages to light the match, only for Lumpy to sneeze it out, angering Russell. Next, Lumpy lifts Russell up to the whale's uvula. Russell stabs it and pulls on it with his hook, making the two laugh. This only succeeds in making the whale vomit all over them. Disheartened, Russell and Lumpy find new hope when they look up and see the whale's blowhole. Russell throws his harpoon towards the blowhole, but unfortunately, he misses and the falling object accidentally pierces Lumpy's head, killing him. Russell starts to go insane and begins using his hook to slash the inside of the whale's stomach. The whale, feeling the pain of Russell's hook, fires Russell out of its blowhole. At first, Russell is still laughing and slashing around like a maniac while in mid-air, but he rejoices upon learning that he's free. Sadly, Russell falls from the sky and his head gets impaled on the mast of a nearby ship. The whale then comes and swallows the ship to add insult to injury. Moral: "Don't bite off more than you can chew!"
33	6	"Snip Snip Hooray!"	Rhode Montijo	Warren Graff, Rhode Montijo & Kenn Navarro	January 3, 2004
Cub happily sits in his highchair as Pop brings in a tray containing a comb, a pair of scissors, and an electric shaver. Cub sees the shiny scissors and tries to reach for them. Pop slaps his hand away, forbidding him to touch them. Pop removes Cub's beanie to reveal that Cub has a full head of long, flowing hair. Pop begins cutting Cub's hair with the scissors, but stops when he accidentally cuts Cub's right ear off. Cub begins to scream and cry in pain and Pop starts panicking as blood spurts out of Cub's wound. The scene fades to black. The scene then fades back to Cub happily licking a lollipop while wearing bandages over the right side of his head. Pop proudly looks at Cub and then looks for the electric shaver, which he has apparently misplaced. He hears a buzzing sound and looks up to see a laughing Cub, who now has a flap of skin detached from his forehead, holding the shaver. While Cub appears not to care about it, a panicked Pop rushes over and grabs the shaver, quickly turning it off. Pop then cautiously combs and pushes down on the loose flap of skin on Cub's head without any cries or protests from the child. Satisfied, Pop tries to turn the shaver back on, but to no avail. He sees that the shaver has become unplugged, so, setting the shaver down next to Cub, he goes to plug it back in. Cub starts playing with the shaver, and puts it in his mouth to suck on it. Pop plugs the shaver back in, and it starts tearing the inside of Cub's mouth, throat, and eventually his esophagus to pieces. Cub falls face down on his highchair deadly, while an oblivious Pop searches for his scissors. Locating them, Pop cuts a lock of Cub's hair, brushes some loose hair from her head, and places Cub's beanie back on his head, still unaware that his son is dead. Moral: "Don't run with scissors!"
34	7	"Eyes Cold Lemonade"	Rhode Montijo	Rhode Montijo, Kenn Navarro, Jeff Biancalana & David Winn	March 30, 2004
Giggles and Petunia happily sit at their lemonade stand, awaiting customers. Petunia sighs contentedly, and Giggles pours her some lemonade. Petunia gladly drinks it. Giggles notices that they are out of lemonade, so she grabs a knife and a lemon so she could make some more. She gets ready to cut into the lemon, but she makes sure to move her finger to avoid accidentally cutting herself. After slicing the lemon in half, Giggles notices that a nail from the lemonade stand's sign has fallen off. She looks up to see that part of the sign has become detached from the stand. The sign swoops down in front of her, slicing her face off. Giggles screams in pain, causing Petunia to spit out her lemonade all over Giggles' face in shock. The citric acid from the lemonade burns the inside of Giggles' face, and she screams in pain, again. Later on, we see that Petunia has reset the sign, only now with far more nails than before and in a sloppy manner. Satisfied with her work, Petunia starts squeezing lemons again. Meanwhile, Giggles, who has bandages wrapped around most of her face, including both of her eyes, ignores her injury and continues to work. She blindly reaches for a lemon and manages to slice it in half. Another nail falls from the sign, only now from the other side. The sign begins sliding downwards towards Petunia. Petunia notices this, but unfortunately for her, not fast enough. The sign crushes her head against the side of the lemonade stand, killing her. One of Petunia's eyeballs comes loose from her head and rolls over to Giggles. Giggles picks up the eye, thinking that it is a lemon, and slowly cuts it in half. She then juices the fluid out of the eye and pours the liquid into a glass. Giggles takes a sip and obviously does not like the taste. She adds some sugar to the concoction, drops some ice cubes in, and places a slice of Petunia's eye on the rim of the glass. Moral: "When life gives you lemons, make lemonade!"
35	8	"Milkin' It"	Rhode Montijo	Rhode Montijo, Kenn Navarro, Jeff Biancalana, David Winn & Alan Lau	August 2003
Lifty and Shifty are seen running out of a barnyard, carrying a cow, while Lumpy the farmer shouts and chases after them. The thieving brothers toss the cow into a hot air balloon, untie the anchor (rope), and fly away with their prize. Lumpy grabs onto the rope hanging down from the balloon, only to get dragged across the ground. His farm clothes are torn off, his stomach gets scraped, and he is dragged through the circular opening of the pivot the balloon was tied to. This tears the skin off the upper half of Lumpy's body and compresses his body, killing him. Lifty and Shifty tease and laugh at Lumpy, but they then turn to find that the balloon is headed straight for a power line. A bird lands on the power line and is instantly vaporized, leading Lifty and Shifty to lighten the load of the balloon to float above the wire to avoid being vaporized. They begin by throwing multiple heavy objects out of the balloon. This doesn't have any meaningful effect however and the balloon is still on a direct course for the power line. Lifty and Shifty begin to debate on who has to milk the cow to lighten it. Eventually, Lifty begins milking the cow while Shifty pours the milk out of the balloon with a bucket. Eventually, the cow becomes emaciated and is out of milk, but they are still headed for the power line. Lifty shrugs, unsure of what to do, but Shifty has a devious plan to steer clear from the power line. Shifty cold-heartedly throws Lifty out of the balloon, where he is gruesomely impaled on a pine tree through his mouth, spreading his organs on the branches like a Christmas tree. The balloon makes it over the power line, and Shifty begins jumping up and down in celebration. The basket he's jumping on breaks, however, causing Shifty to grab onto the cow's udders for dear life. Shifty sees that the balloon is headed for a fast-moving windmill, and because he is hanging below the basket, Shifty begins getting cut by the blades, shredding his entire lower body, making him scream and groan in pain. His intestines get caught on one of the blades, and his spinal cord is torn by his refusal to let go of the cow. Shifty accidentally lets go of the cow's udders and is spun around the windmill several times before he finally stops, dead. The cow gets out of the balloon, which lands nearby, and begins eating some grass. Before the episode ends, the cow's udders slightly swell up. Moral: "Don't cry over spilled milk!"
36	9	"Out of Sight, Out of Mime"	Rhode Montijo	Rhode Montijo, Kenn Navarro, Jeff Biancalana & David Winn	October 9, 2003
At nighttime, the Happy Tree Friends are enjoying Halloween. Mime walks to a home with a bag and rings the doorbell. The Mole answers the door as Mime shows his bag. The Mole shuts the door, making Mime sad. As he leaves, Giggles, Lumpy, and Flaky arrive at the Mole's home, while Mime rushes in to join them. As the Mole prepares to hand out candy, he drops it and a group of rats eats it. The trick-or-treaters get scared and run away, with Lumpy's scythe accidentally severing Mime's head. The Mole picks it up and slices a hole in the top. He then pulls Mime's brain off and then takes Mime's head out, revealing a candle in his mouth. A rat takes one of Mime's eyes before the episode ends. Moral: "Keep your chin up!"
37	10	"Class Act"	Rhode Montijo	Rhode Montijo, Kenn Navarro, Jeff Biancalana & David Winn	November 14, 2003
In a theater, many animals sit down in their seats. The stage has Nutty sleeping in a bed. The director, Lumpy orders Toothy, who is holding a candle, to arrive on stage. A spotlight turns on, with the Mole manning it. He points it towards Toothy. Lumpy orders Lifty and Shifty to shake Flaky, making her dandruff fall and creating the illusion that it is snowing. Lumpy then orders Toothy to sing "O Christmas Tree", with Sniffles as a candy cane, Giggles as a present, and Cuddles as a Christmas tree. Nutty gets excited when he sees Sniffles' costume and bites off the right side, along with Sniffles' body, mistaken for a real candy cane. As Lumpy orders Toothy to continue singing, Sniffles runs into a rope, causing a weight to drop down and cause Giggles' costume to slice off her face. As it falls off, Toothy continues singing, although tearfully, but Giggles slips on her face and causes it to fly into the Mole's face. He moves the spotlight over to Lifty and Shifty, who get blinded by the light and drop Flaky. She falls down the chimney, causing her quills to get stuck in it, before hitting the ground, skinned. Toothy and Cuddles now scream, and noticing that Lumpy has escaped the building, try to leave. Toothy accidentally drops the candle he was holding and causes the theater to burst into flames. Cuddles tries to escape, but his costume prevents him from leaving. The audience also plans on escaping, pushing Cuddles so hard that his face falls off, presumably killing him. Everyone escapes, although harmed. Toothy prepares to sing, and everyone holds hands around the burning building. However, the theater unexpectedly explodes, sending everyone flying. Moral: "It's better to give than to receive!"
38	11	"The Way You Make Me Wheel"	Rhode Montijo	Rhode Montijo, Kenn Navarro, Jeff Biancalana & David Winn	May 30, 2004
Lumpy is seen driving his car through the road. He adjusts his rearview mirror and shaves. Lumpy sees ducks crossing the road and swerves to avoid them, accidentally cutting himself in the neck. As a result, blood covers the windshield. Lumpy turns on the windshield wipers, unaware that the blood is on the inside. The car hits a bump on the road and loses its rear wheel, slowing down to a stop. A tow truck arrives with Handy at the wheel. Handy gets down and lifts Lumpy's car up with a jack. Lumpy starts to pass out from blood loss as he cleans the windshield. After Handy fixes the car, Lumpy waves him goodbye. Lumpy puts the car in reverse and accidentally rams into Handy, crushing him against his tow truck. Handy's tail touches the spinning wheel which causes him to lose his organs and get spun around by the wheel. The car is now filled with blood, and the ducks swim in it. Before the episode ends, one of the ducks picks up Lumpy's razor. Moral: "One good turn deserves another!"
39	12	"Better Off Bread"	Rhode Montijo	Rhode Montijo, Kenn Navarro, Jeff Biancalana, David Winn & Warren Graff	July 7, 2004
Splendid is seen baking bread in his home. Meanwhile, Giggles happily skips in a field of flowers, but she falls. Splendid hears her screaming and flies out of his home to rescue her. As he catches Giggles, he accidentally breaks her back. Splendid soon finds a leaking oil tanker that is covering various animals with oil. As he flies to the boat, Giggles' eyes pop out of her eye sockets. He uses his laser vision to fix the leak, but this causes a spark that ignites the oil and incinerates the animals. Splendid hears someone else screaming and flies away. The screaming turns out to come from Toothy who is panicking over a meteor. As Splendid flies toward the meteor, Giggles' face peels off. He punches the meteor and puts Giggles next to Toothy. As Toothy thanks Splendid, meteorites fall down on the ground, with one of them hitting Toothy. Splendid comes back to his home, only to find that his bread is burnt. He decides to rewind time, causing everything that happened in the episode to return to the start, including the bread becoming unburnt. Giggles falls again, but Splendid ignores her screaming and turns the volume up on the radio. Moral: "Time heals all wounds!"
40	13	"I Get a Trick Out of You"	Rhode Montijo	Rhode Montijo, Kenn Navarro, Jeff Biancalana, David Winn & Warren Graff	August 6, 2004 (Note: This episode first appeared on the Third Strike DVD, released on August 2, 2004.)
The Happy Tree Friends are sitting down for a show at a birthday party. They get dazzled by the appearance of Lumpy the magician. Lumpy pulls a bird out of his hat, only to find that it is fake. He kicks it away and then asks for a volunteer. Cuddles decides to take part in the act. Lumpy gets a box ready, and Cuddles jumps in the box. He saws Cuddles in half, but this turns out to injure him. Cuddles and Lumpy end up in an ambulance. As Lumpy lays on the doors, they fly open. Lumpy grabs on Cuddles' lower half as it flies out with Lumpy grabbing Cuddles' legs. He pulls on Cuddles' spinal cord, causing his front half to leave the ambulance. They end up at a hospital. Now, in an emergency room, Cuddles is stitched up with his blood being collected in an IV tank. Lumpy decides to entertain Cuddles with some tricks. First, he pulls a bouquet of roses out of his hat. After this, he pulls out a newspaper but doesn't know what to put in it. He finds the IV tank containing Cuddles' blood and removes it from its hanger. He squeezes the blood into the newspaper and makes it disappear. Unfortunately, this trick made Cuddles pass out from blood loss. Shocked at what happened, Lumpy gets a potion and throws it on the ground, leaving a cloud of green smoke. However, it turns out that the potion made Lumpy fall on the floor, with his body being set on fire. Moral: "Two wrongs don't make a right!"
41	14	"Shard at Work"	Kenn Navarro	Rhode Montijo, Kenn Navarro, Warren Graff & Ken Pontac	October 5, 2004
Handy eyes a burned-out lightbulb on the top of a ladder. He reaches for it, but due to the fact that he has no hands, he cannot do it. He decides to use his teeth to unscrew the lightbulb, but the ladder falls, shattering the many lightbulbs on Handy's toolbox. Handy's teeth end up shattering the lightbulb, causing glass shards to cut his mouth. As Handy goes to a first-aid kit, he steps on a glass shard, causing him to step backwards in pain and knock over a table. A fishbowl gets sent flying into Handy's head, causing him to suffocate. Handy bumps into a shelf, destroying it and its contents. He then bumps into a wall, causing a hole to appear. As he keeps slamming his head into the wall, various objects on a shelf come crashing down. Eventually, Handy drowns, and a feather shatters the fishbowl. The fish that was inside the fishbowl is now swimming in the blood inside Handy's mouth. Moral: "The glass is always half full!"
42	15	"Water Way to Go"	Kenn Navarro	Rhode Montijo, Kenn Navarro, Warren Graff & Ken Pontac	February 3, 2005
Pop and Cub are at the beach. When Pop is about to step down the wooden steps after Cub, the cooler he is holding slips from his hands and ends up bouncing down said steps. Thankfully, nothing else goes wrong, so Pop picks up the cooler again and continues on. After he sets down the cooler, Cub suddenly wants something to drink, but the soda can has to be opened first. Pop is more than happy to help, only for the can to squirt its contents into his face and press into Cub's face. Later, the now-bandaged Cub is drinking the soda when Pop offers him to play in the sand. After burying the baby bear up to his neck, Pop sees an ice cream truck driving by, so he asks Cub to wait while he buys some ice cream. After buying, however, Pop is horrified to see his son's cap floating above the water. Cub is revealed to be stuck underwater due to the tide washing over him, but Pop does not see him during his search. Pop then tries using a boat to reach the cap. Little did he know that he unknowingly scraped his son's face when he was pushing the boat into the water. Things get worse when Pop turns on the boat's engine, causing the propeller to completely shred poor Cub. Of course, Cub is nowhere underneath the spot where the cap is floating. Meanwhile, Cub's shredded remains become a free meal for the seagulls. Moral: "Keep your head above water!"
43	16	"Out on a Limb"	Kenn Navarro	Rhode Montijo, Kenn Navarro, Warren Graff & Ken Pontac	March 2, 2005
Lumpy is cutting down a huge tree, only to end up getting one of his legs stuck between one of its branches and the ground when he is running away from the toppling tree. Obviously, the tree is too heavy to lift, so Lumpy tries to cut off the branch instead, but the axe's head ends up flying off when he prepares to swing. Lumpy begins rummaging through his pocket for something else to use. He has a button, a spoon, and a paperclip. He decides to use the spoon — not on the branch, but on his stuck leg. The agonizing process goes on for hours. By the time night falls, the cut area of the leg has been reduced to a bone. The bone is too hard to cut, so Lumpy tries to force his spoon through with the help of a nearby rock. After another cringe-inducing effort, the bone is finally cut, and Lumpy is relieved. Unfortunately, he soon finds out that he stupidly cut his free leg instead of the stuck one. With the spoon bent and unusable, he has no choice but to go through the whole pain all over again with a paperclip. Moral: "The bigger they are, the harder they fall!"
44	17	"Keepin' It Reel"	Kenn Navarro	Kenn Navarro, Warren Graff & Ken Pontac	May 2005
Flippy takes a seat at a movie theater. Mime is "eating" loudly nearby, bothering him. Meanwhile, Lumpy walks into the theater with a lot of snacks. This causes him to accidentally bump into the projector. The theater screen begins to flash, triggering Flippy's PTSD and became mutilated. Mime, who is now "drinking" (also loudly), ends up as his first victim as the deer ends up being ripped apart by the seat. Petunia is next as her head is shoved into the popcorn machine, where it is heated to produce popcorn-sized pieces of her brain. After that, Fliqpy chases Flaky. Between flashes, the whole ordeal goes from Cuddles noticing Fliqpy's attack, to getting clubbed by Flaky's body, to finally being left as a corpse alongside the decapitated Flaky. A scared Toothy backs up near the projector, not knowing that Fliqpy is behind it. The poor beaver ends up having his head impaled by said projector thanks to Fliqpy, with one of his eyes stuck on the lens, giving the audience a view of Toothy's eye as it burns away. Lumpy boos at the "movie", not knowing that he is the next victim of Fliqpy. Moral: "A picture is worth a thousand words!"
45	18	"A Hard Act to Swallow"	Kenn Navarro	Rhode Montijo, Kenn Navarro, Warren Graff & Ken Pontac	June 1, 2005
Sniffles is reading a book of math divisions while eating a slice of bread. A baby ant happens to show up in front of him, picking up bread crumbs. Of course, Sniffles does not miss this opportunity to eat him. After that, the anteater leans back to nap. Inside him, the baby ant fires his flare gun to get help from his family. Next thing he knows, Sniffles has been pinned to the tree he leaned onto. The ants begin their rescue mission by breaking through Sniffles's teeth with a battering ram. They tie a rope to his uvula to climb down, but it soon gets ripped off by the ants' weight, making Sniffles scream in pain. However, the ants immediately go for Plan B — Sniffles's heart. One of the ants ties up one of the arteries, causing the blood flow to get blocked and the heart to expand. Soon, Sniffles's heart cannot take it anymore, and it explodes, leaving a large hole in his body. A yellow inflatable slide pops out, and the ants happily slide out. Moral: "Follow your heart!"
46	19	"Let It Slide"	Kenn Navarro	Kenn Navarro, Warren Graff & Ken Pontac	July 7, 2005
At a water park, Cuddles, Flaky, and Lumpy are standing atop a water slide. Lumpy slides down first, popping out one of the bolts on a part of the slide in the process. He ends up unknowingly slicing an unattended Cub in half. He also ends up losing his swimwear, freaking Giggles out when he exits the pool. In a panic, he grabs a nearby towel hanging on a valve to cover himself, causing the valve to rotate and turn off the water at the slide. A nervous Flaky is next but is unsure about going down the slide. Cuddles begins to pester her to slide down, but despite her refusing, she ends up being pushed into the now-dry slide by the bunny. Her quills begin poking out the slide as she is flayed on the way down. The rest of the bolts finally pop out, causing a section of the slide to lower itself. The bloody Flaky reaches the water, where her body sinks, leaving what is left of her skin to float up. Lumpy soon realizes his mistake and turns the water back on. Cuddles takes his turn, and he enjoys the slide until his body is sliced in half by the lowered section of the slide. Lumpy now uses Flaky's skin to replace the towel, not knowing that it does not even cover his lower half, causing Giggles to scream yet again. Moral: "Don't forget to wear sunblock!"
47	20	"Icy You"	Kenn Navarro	Kenn Navarro, Warren Graff & Ken Pontac	September 7, 2005 (ekd)
Nutty jitters into a convenience store before realizing that he has no money. Fortunately, clerk Lumpy happens to be in trouble himself — his tongue is stuck in the hot dog rollers. With the clerk unable to watch the store, Nutty uses this opportunity to grab all the sweets for himself. He suddenly comes across a slushy machine, making him drop the sweets he was carrying. He tries a few cups, but those are not enough for the sugar-crazed squirrel. He decides to just drink straight from the machine's nozzle, all while his vision begins to blur. Soon, he finds his lips frozen on the nozzle. Attempting to pull himself away results in him ripping off his lips instead. He stumbles backwards in pain and ends up getting poked by a candy holder. Nutty ends up gruesomely flying around the store as if he were a burst balloon. He stops when he slams into the store's automatic doors. The poor squirrel can only moan in pain before the same doors forcibly close down on him, splattering his crushed remains everywhere. Back in the store, Lumpy (still stuck to the rollers) is mopping up Nutty's mess. During the closing iris, he ends up slipping and falling to the floor. Moral: "Feed a cold, starve a fever!"
48	21	"Hello Dolly"	Kenn Navarro	Kenn Navarro, Warren Graff & Ken Pontac	September 30, 2005
Petunia is pushing a baby carriage containing her teddy bear when she notices something shiny in the nearby bushes. Turns out it is the cursed idol. Petunia replaces her doll with the idol, not knowing that its presence causes two birds to fall to the ground, dead. She first passes by Pop, who is reading his newspaper, and Cub, who is playing with the fire hydrant. The idol's presence causes the hydrant to blast Cub into the wall, where he ends up reduced to a red paste and a few stray organs (plus his hat). Next, Petunia passes by Disco Bear, who is dancing to some disco music playing through his headphones. Suddenly, the music starts reaching deafening levels, causing Disco Bear's head to explode. Petunia finally arrives at her home, where she prepares to go to sleep. Not long after she turns off the lights, a noise is heard, causing her to turn them back on. She is horrified to see her heart popping out from her body on a bedspring. She tries pushing it back in, but more of her organs pop out stuck on springs. The poor skunk dies, and the lamp turns off. Moral: "All that glitters is not gold!"
49	22	"Remains to Be Seen"	Kenn Navarro	Jeff Biancalana, David Winn & Alan Lau	November 2, 2004
A group of costumed Happy Tree Friends (except the Generic Tree Friends, whose costumes are invisible so we cannot see them) are out trick-or-treating, while Flippy is driving a truck carrying barrels of radioactive goo. He stops to let the critters cross the road when suddenly, his car backfires, causing him to flip out, due to his PTSD and mutilation. He steps on the gas, killing everybody present, including himself. Later, Lumpy has finished burying all the dead critters. He then notices Nutty's foot still exposed above the dirt, so he pushes it in, but Nutty's arm pops out instead. Lumpy pushes said arm, then another foot, then another arm, before Nutty's head pops out with a moan, prompting Lumpy to bury him in a large mound. He is not out of the woods yet though, as the rest of the dead critters, not just Nutty, rise from their graves as zombies. The moose panics for a while before he decides to run towards his tool shed and grab a lawnmower, using it to destroy the zombies. His lawnmower is suddenly stopped by a pair of hands. Zombie Fliqpy rises from his grave, then leaps onto Lumpy, biting his arm. The poor moose shakes Fliqpy off, tearing off his arm in the process, before running away while letting out a girlish scream. Zombie Fliqpy has no lower body, but he happens to spot zombie Handy, whose upper half is then torn off by him, leaving the legs free for him to use. Lumpy runs back into the shed and has to decide on a tool to replace his missing arm. He picks up a leaf blower that does not affect Fliqpy at all. That is, until Fliqpy leaps toward him again, causing the leaf blower to get lodged in his eye. Lumpy detaches his arm from the tool and watches as Fliqpy's head inflates and then rips open, exposing his inflated brain, which attracts the rest of the zombies. The apocalypse ends when zombie Toothy bites down on Fliqpy's brain, causing an explosion that leaves a large crater where the zombies end up buried once again, this time for good. Lumpy feels relieved after all that trouble until his arm suddenly attacks him. Turns out, his torn arm has been zombified. As Lumpy looks at it in confusion, the arm punches him out. Moral: "Live and let live!"
50	23	"Stealing the Spotlight"	Kenn Navarro	Kenn Navarro, Warren Graff, Ken Pontac, David Winn & Jeff Biancalana	December 8, 2004
Lumpy enters a one-sided competition with Pop on who has the better Christmas decorations after noticing the latter setting up his own decorations with the help of Cub. As for the father-son duo, Pop has just climbed down his ladder and is about to move it somewhere else when he accidentally smacks Cub into the snow with it, causing one of his teeth to fall out. Pop tries to place it back by himself to no avail. He ends up deciding to use his hammer to, well, hammer the tooth back, with unsettling results, though Cub is happy. Back at Lumpy's place, the moose is carrying a ball of Christmas lights when Nutty happens to jitter by from his usual sugar rush. The squirrel notices the lights, mistakes them for sweets, and proceeds to eat them. This causes his organs to get pulled out when Lumpy tugs and forcefully pulls the lights. Meanwhile, Pop is hammering some nails on the roof to tie the lights around, not noticing that the bucket containing the nails is sliding down the roof until it finally falls. By the time Pop looks down, the bucket has landed on Cub's head, with the result too horrific to be seen. The episode cuts to Pop trying to remove all the nails stuck in Cub. He soon finds one nail that refuses to budge. Hammering it back in only makes things worse, but there is nothing else he can do to remove it anyway. After all that trouble, Pop takes Cub outside and plugs the electricity in to turn on all his Christmas lights. The decoration manages to wow Giggles and Petunia, who happen to be passing by, as well as Lumpy. Bothered by this, he decides to do something that he feels can surpass Pop's work. The result is an unholy abomination consisting of various light-generating objects stacked on top of his trailer, including a lighthouse. Lumpy puts his goggles on before turning on his decoration. The night is suddenly filled with light as if it were daytime. Of course, the intense light leads to fatal results: Giggles catches fire, Pop is boiled to death, Cub explodes, and Toothy and the rest of the critters end up vaporized. The light is so deadly it even generates a moon-destroying beam. After the showcase, the burned Lumpy takes off his goggles, revealing that even his eyes have fallen victim to his own lights. The Mole, who even managed to shield his blind eyes earlier, gives Lumpy's decoration a (flaming) thumbs-up. Moral: "Always look on the bright side of life!"
51	24	"Ski Ya, Wouldn't Wanna Be Ya!"	Kenn Navarro	Kenn Navarro, Warren Graff, Ken Pontac, Aubrey Ankrum, David Winn & Jeff Biancalana	March 2006
After Disco Bear accidentally bumps into Flaky, causing her to get caught on a ski lift, she must face her fears and ski down a mountain when she gets stranded at the top. She ends up suffering from a foot pierced by a nail on a board, an outstretched arm, an avalanche going after her, and another foot also getting pierced, only this time as her only chance at survival. She eventually crashes through a chain link fence surrounding a cabin. Disco Bear opens the cabin door, showing Flaky shortly before she breaks into numerous little pieces. The cabin is finally hit by the avalanche, covering everything in snow. Disco Bear pops out seemingly fine, only for the board that Flaky was riding on to hit him in the face, the nail piercing his skull. Moral: "Put your best foot forward!"
52	25	"Blind Date"	Kenn Navarro	Kenn Navarro, Warren Graff, Ken Pontac, David Winn & Jeff Biancalana	February 14, 2006
After doing some shaving, Mole begins his date. However, being blind, he ends up at the wrong house, causing him to unknowingly date the oblivious Lumpy (who is only interested in his chocolate) and miss his actual date, Giggles. On their way, a semi-trailer truck blocking the road is being fixed by Handy. Of course, Mole ends up running over the orange cone before driving through the truck, causing its hood to close in on Handy and cut him in half. Meanwhile, the roof of Mole's car got taken off and the top of Lumpy's skull got ripped off, exposing his brain and leaving him vegetative. A bird lands on Lumpy's brain and starts pecking it, making him twitch. The two first arrive at a drive-in movie theater, and then at a restaurant. At the latter, a second bird lands on the rotting Lumpy. Elsewhere, on a cliff, Disco Bear is dancing in his car to seduce the visibly uncomfortable Petunia. When he tries for a kiss, he gets sprayed in the face, burning his eyes. Mole's car finally arrives at the spot, and he obliviously bumps Disco Bear's car off the cliff. There, one of the birds picks out a piece of Lumpy's brain. This results in Lumpy's arm spontaneously flying up to slap Mole in the face. Back inside Giggles's house, the still-waiting Giggles hears her doorbell ring. She excitedly opens the door, only to be left confused by the sight of a rotting Lumpy holding a flower, again a mistake by Mole. Meanwhile, an egg is now present on Lumpy's brain. It starts to hatch. Moral: "Love is blind!"
53	26	"Suck It Up"	Kenn Navarro	Kenn Navarro, Warren Graff, Ken Pontac & David Winn	April 29, 2006
Sniffles is lying sick on his bed. The baby ant manages to take his cookies because of this. His inability to use his snout does not stop Sniffles from devising an idea to eat the ants yet again, this time in the form of a suction machine worn over his face. At first, it goes well, managing to suck up a bowling ball and then hurl it to the ants' home. He even manages to get his cookies back. That is until the boy ant decides to use a box of nails, which promptly get sucked up and injure Sniffles. The baby ant takes this opportunity to take off the control knob, causing Sniffles to be unable to stop his machine. Sniffles first ends up getting his snout burned off by acid, then falls backward from slipping over a test tube. When he gets up, the machine's tube is stuck on one side of his head. Of course, with the machine still active, it tears a hole in his head and sucks up his brain. The baby ant returns and places the knob back on the device, setting it to blow. This causes Sniffles to be completely sucked into his machine before being blown as a chunk of meat. As the ant family celebrate their victory, the baby ant suddenly sneezes. Moral: "Follow your nose!"
54	27	"From A to Zoo"	Kenn Navarro	Kenn Navarro, Warren Graff, Ken Pontac, David Winn & Jeff Biancalana	December 6, 2005 (part 1); January 3, 2006 (part 2)
Lumpy struggles to keep track of the rascally tree friends when they intentionally run away from him at the zoo. Cuddles and Toothy tease a baboon before running away. Sniffles asks Lumpy to take a picture of him with a said baboon, only for things to go horribly wrong as the anteater gets attacked. While breaking a glass case to get a tranquilizer dart to stop the baboon, Lumpy ends up accidentally injuring Petunia with the broken glass shards. Worse, the first tranquilizer shot ends up hitting her instead, causing her to fall into a snake exhibit, while the second one jabs Lumpy's throat, causing him to pass out. At that point, it is too late to save Petunia. Meanwhile, Cuddles and Toothy tease yet another animal, a rhino. After burning the rhino with a branding iron, Cuddles promptly ditches Toothy before Lumpy can catch him. However, Toothy requests to see the rhino, so Lumpy obliges. He suddenly hears a scream. One head turn later, and Toothy's head gets impaled on the rhino's horn without Lumpy realizing it. Lumpy finds a scared Flaky surrounded by chicks. He makes things worse by accidentally stepping on one, causing Flaky to become even more hysterical. They eventually end up covered in chick blood after Lumpy accidentally slips and crushes more chicks while trying to take Flaky away from the area. As for Cuddles, after playing with some helium, he encounters the baboon again, now free from its cage. When Cuddles tries to run away, he ends up jabbing his eye on the helium tank's nozzle, inflating his other eye like a balloon. Lumpy tries to calm down Flaky with a balloon, but she ends up fainting when she notices that said balloon is Cuddles's inflated eye, with the rabbit himself still attached. In the end, every student but Flaky (who is now traumatized) is dead, with the baboon taking Sniffles's place. As the bus leaves the zoo, a camera flash occurs, followed by the baboon's screech and a bus crash. Moral: "Don't bite the hand that feeds you!"

=== Season 3 (2007–2013) ===
No. overall	No. in season	Title	Directed by	Written by	Original release date
55	1	"Read 'em and Weep"	Kenn Navarro	Ken Pontac, Warren Graff & Kenn Navarro	October 4, 2007
Pop buys the Necronomicon from Toothy's book sale as he finds it to be less expensive than a book that Cub suggests. When he reads the book to Cub, it kills hundreds of birds, and later summons a demon that possesses Cub. The next day, Pop tries to possess a sickly green Cub, who refuses to eat the food that he's given. Petunia, who is a girl scout, comes to Pop's door to sell cookies. However, she is grabbed and eaten alive by the demon, which now has tentacles popping out of Cub's mouth, and a beak. A frightened Pop calls a priest in return, who is revealed to be Lumpy. Lumpy fights the demon in a struggle, while Pop looks for a weapon to fight with. Not knowing that Cub has been freed from the demon's control by Lumpy, Pop flattens him with a shovel. The episode ends with Pop and Lumpy at Cub's funeral, where it is revealed that the demon now has possessed Lumpy. Moral: "Don't judge a book by its cover!"
56	2	"Can't Stop Coffin"	Kenn Navarro	Ken Pontac, Warren Graff & Kenn Navarro	October 10, 2007
Cuddles, Russell, Toothy and Cro-Marmot are playing baseball, but the ball gets thrown over a fence. Cuddles tries to hop over the fence, only to land in an open coffin that Lumpy is burying. After a struggle to get outside of the now-closed coffin, he skins his fingers to the bone while trying to free himself from the coffin, as revealed when he lights a match. The match sets the coffin ablaze, but is then put out when Lumpy nonsensically waters the coffin. The water begins to drown Cuddles. Lumpy, trying to leave the cemetery using a truck, backs up into the grave, and begins making a mess out of the grave when he tries to drive away. The truck breaks the coffin and skins half of Cuddles' face, along with destroying his eyeball. The coffin goes deeper underground, where the Mole is revealed to live in. After mistaking Cuddles' remaining eye for an apple and grabbing it out, Cuddles, trying to crawl away, is crushed by Lumpy's truck, which has now also gone underground. The final shot ends with Mole watching a show on his television, having eaten Cuddles' eye. Moral: "Don't be afraid to get dirt under your fingernails!"
57	3	"We're Scrooged!"	Kenn Navarro	Ken Pontac, Warren Graff & Kenn Navarro	November 23, 2007
Lumpy who owns a toy shop sells blood squirting parts that he made from his worker, Toothy by being chopped up by the chattered teeth. Moral: "A great man is hard on himself; a small man is hard on others!"
58	4	"A Sucker for Love" (Part 1 & 2)	Kenn Navarro	Ken Pontac, Warren Graff & Kenn Navarro	January 16, 2008 (part 1); February 7, 2008 (part 2)
59	5	"A Sucker for Love" (Part 1 & 2)	Kenn Navarro	Ken Pontac, Warren Graff & Kenn Navarro	January 16, 2008 (part 1); February 7, 2008 (part 2)
Nutty sees Cub eating a lollipop, falls in love with the lollipop, and steals the candy. Hearing his son crying, Pop reprimands Nutty and gives the treat back to his son. Forlorn, Nutty walks away, spots a gumball machine, and falls in love with the contraption. He accidentally breaks the gumball machine and tries to chew all the gumballs at once, including the broken glass. In immense pain, he runs by a candy shop and spots a box of chocolates. He once again is smitten and fantasizes about marrying the box of chocolates, having children, growing old, and even killing Lumpy after the moose eats some of the chocolates. He tries to enter the candy shop, but it is closed, much to his disappointment. Trying to get into the candy shop, he is killed by a series of events leading up to him being run over by an ambulance driving Pop and Cub to the hospital. Morals: "Take the bitter with the sweet!" (Part 1); "The more you judge, the less you love!" (Part 2)
60	6	"Just Desert"	Kenn Navarro	Warren Graff, Ken Pontac, David Winn, Jeff Biancalana & Kenn Navarro	May 21, 2008
Lumpy sets out for a snowy vacation but takes a wrong turn and ends up stranded in the scorching desert. Moral: "You can lead a horse to water but you can't make it drink!"
61	7	"Peas in a Pod"	Kenn Navarro	Ken Pontac & Kenn Navarro	October 8, 2008
A comet carrying a mysterious seed crashes into Lumpy's yard. Curious, Lumpy plants it, and soon, identical clones of himself sprout from the ground. At first, they eagerly assist him with daily tasks, but before long, their true nature emerges: they have an insatiable urge for chaos and destruction. Moral: "Two is company. Three is a crowd!"
62	8	"Wrath of Con"	Kenn Navarro	Ken Pontac, Warren Graff & Kenn Navarro	April 30, 2009
The Tree Friends head to a comic book convention, eager to meet their hero, Splendid the flying squirrel. Moral: "No good deed goes unpunished."
63	9	"All Flocked Up"	Kenn Navarro	Ken Pontac, Warren Graff & Kenn Navarro	June 18, 2009
Lumpy rescues a helpless baby bird, thinking he's done a good deed. But it doesn't take long before he realizes he may have made a terrible mistake. Moral: "Birds of a feather flock together!"
64	10	"Something Fishy"	Kenn Navarro	Ken Pontac, Warren Graff & Kenn Navarro	September 10, 2009
The gang brings their pets for show-and-tell, but Russell's scaly companion seems a little too interested in the student body. Moral: "Teach a man to fish and you feed him for life!"
65	11	"Without a Hitch"	Kenn Navarro	Ken Pontac, Warren Graff & Kenn Navarro	October 13, 2009
On a stormy night, Flaky's paranoia spikes as she drives alone. She sees Flippy hitchhiking and stops, but her fear of him snapping quickly spirals out of control. Moral: "The road to hell is paved with good intentions"
66	12	"Swelter Skelter"	Kenn Navarro	Ken Pontac, Warren Graff & Kenn Navarro	November 6, 2009
Desperate to escape a heat wave, Lifty and Shifty kidnap Cro-Marmot only to find their apartment turning into an icy nightmare. Moral: "Don't sweat the small stuff!"
67	13	"I Nub You"	Kenn Navarro	Ken Pontac, Warren Graff & Kenn Navarro	February 2, 2010
While trying to stop her pet bird from flying away, Petunia accidentally gets her hands caught in a closing window, resulting in her amputation. After recovering, she leaves the hospital with bandaged stumps and soon crosses paths with Handy, instantly falling in love. Moral: "The spaces between your fingers are there for someone to fill them."
68	14	"A Bit of a Pickle"	Kenn Navarro	Ken Pontac, Warren Graff & Kenn Navarro	April 16, 2010
Lammy struggles to make friends as her mischievous not-so-imaginary companion, Mr. Pickels, keeps killing them. Moral: "We don't see things as they are, we see things as we are."
69	15	"See You Later, Elevator"	Kenn Navarro	Ken Pontac, Warren Graff & Kenn Navarro	September 20, 2010
Sniffles, Cuddles, Mime, and Giggles find themselves trapped inside a malfunctioning elevator. Moral: "There is no elevator to success. You have to take the stairs."
70	16	"Clause for Concern"	Kenn Navarro	Ken Pontac, Warren Graff & Kenn Navarro	December 8, 2011
Pop takes on the role of a mall santa, but things take a chaotic turn when he accidentally picks the wrong bag of presents. Moral: "Ignorance is bliss!"
71	17	"The Chokes on You"	Kenn Navarro	Ken Pontac, Warren Graff & Kenn Navarro	March 19, 2012
Lumpy accidentally chokes on a doughnut and struggles to breathe. Moral: "The optimist sees the doughnut. The pessimist sees the hole."
72	18	"Royal Flush"	Kenn Navarro	Ken Pontac, Warren Graff & Kenn Navarro	April 27, 2012
Lammy's night out with the girls goes wrong when Mr. Pickels intervenes. Moral: "Take the plunge!"
73	19	"Brake the Cycle"	Kenn Navarro	Ken Pontac, Warren Graff & Kenn Navarro	June 17, 2012
Toothy's new homemade bicycle proves to be catastrophic. Moral: "Life is like riding a bicycle. In order to keep your balance, you must keep moving."
74	20	"Random Acts of Silence"	Kenn Navarro	Ken Pontac, Warren Graff & Kenn Navarro	August 2, 2012
Flippy tries to keep his library quiet, but Sniffles, Nutty and Mime keep disrupting his work, due to his PTSD and mutilation and causing him to flip out. Moral: "There are times when silence has the loudest voice."
75	21	"Breaking Wind"	Kenn Navarro	Ken Pontac, Warren Graff & Kenn Navarro	October 3, 2012
Splendid tries to save the Tree Friends from an oncoming twister, albeit with disastrous results. Moral: "It's an ill wind that blows no good."
76	22	"All in Vein"	Kenn Navarro	Ken Pontac, Warren Graff & Kenn Navarro	October 19, 2012
Count Lumpy looks for fresh blood to feast on. Moral: "Be positive!"
77	23	"Bottled Up Inside"	Kenn Navarro	Ken Pontac, Warren Graff & Kenn Navarro	November 21, 2012
Russell ends up getting impaled by a ship-in-a-bottle. Moral: "Don't bottle up your feelings."
78	24	"No Time Like the Present"	Kenn Navarro	Ken Pontac, Warren Graff & Kenn Navarro	December 20, 2012
Lumpy Claus visits Handy and the Mole's apartment. Moral: "A hug is a great gift - one size fits all and it's easy to exchange!"
79	25	"By the Seat of Your Pants"	Kenn Navarro	Ken Pontac, Warren Graff & Kenn Navarro	March 29, 2013
Flippy flipping out causes Lumpy to get involved in a swimming race. Moral: "Put on your pants one leg at a time."

=== Season 4 (2013–2014) ===
No. overall	No. in season	Title	Directed by	Written by	Original release date
80	1	"You're Kraken Me Up"	Kenn Navarro	Ken Pontac, Warren Graff & Kenn Navarro	June 14, 2013
81	2	"All Work and No Play"	Kenn Navarro	Ken Pontac, Warren Graff & Kenn Navarro	July 18, 2013
82	3	"Buns of Steal"	Kenn Navarro	Ken Pontac, Warren Graff & Kenn Navarro	August 21, 2013
83	4	"Pet Peeve"	Kenn Navarro	Ken Pontac, Warren Graff & Kenn Navarro	October 3, 2013
84	5	"A Vicious Cycle"	Kenn Navarro	Ken Pontac, Warren Graff & Kenn Navarro	October 17, 2013
85	6	"Put Your Back Into It"	Kenn Navarro	Ken Pontac, Warren Graff & Kenn Navarro	December 5, 2013
86	7	"Spare Tire"	Kenn Navarro	Ken Pontac, Warren Graff & Kenn Navarro	January 7, 2014
87	8	"Camp Pokeneyeout"	Kenn Navarro	Ken Pontac, Warren Graff & Kenn Navarro	January 16, 2014
88	9	"Dream Job"	Kenn Navarro	Ken Pontac, Warren Graff & Kenn Navarro	March 6, 2014

=== Season 5 (2016) ===
No. overall	No. in season	Title	Directed by	Written by	Original release date
89	1	"Going Out With A Bang"	Kenn Navarro	Ken Pontac, Warren Graff & Kenn Navarro	December 7, 2016
90	2	"A Handy Nanny"	Kenn Navarro	Ken Pontac, Warren Graff & Kenn Navarro	December 16, 2016
91	3	"An Inconvenient Tooth"	Kenn Navarro	Ken Pontac, Warren Graff & Kenn Navarro	December 22, 2016
92	4	"Just Be Claus"	Kenn Navarro	Ken Pontac, Warren Graff & Kenn Navarro	December 7, 2016
93	5	"In Over Your Hedge"	Kenn Navarro	Ken Pontac, Warren Graff & Kenn Navarro	December 22, 2016

=== Season 6 (2026) ===
No. overall	No. in season	Title	Directed by	Written by	Original release date
94	1	"You're Kiln Me"	Kenn Navarro	Ken Pontac, Warren Graff & Kenn Navarro	March 15, 2026
95	2	"Swole Mates"	Kenn Navarro	Ken Pontac, Warren Graff & Kenn Navarro	September 4, 2026
96	3	"Knit Happens"	Kenn Navarro	Ken Pontac, Warren Graff & Kenn Navarro	TBA

== Other shorts ==
=== Irregular episodes ===
No.	Title	Directed by	Written by
1	"Banjo Frenzy"	Aubrey Ankrum	Rhode Montijo
The pilot episode created around 1999 featured early versions of Lumpy, Giggles, Cuddles, and Toothy. A dinosaur plays a banjo, while a squirrel, rabbit, and beaver sit down and watch. One of the dinosaur's banjo strings breaks, making the onlookers laugh. Enraged, the dinosaur decapitates the squirrel, vertically slices the rabbit in half, and decapitates the beaver. All of a sudden, the beaver's severed head comes back to life and bites the dinosaur's leg, causing the dinosaur to scream in pain.
2	"Dino-Sore Days"	Michael "Lippy" Lippman	Warren Graff, Rhode Montijo, Kenn Navarro, Michael "Lippy" Lipman
An animated short film featuring the character Cro-Marmot in prehistoric times. It features him eating a dead dinosaur. However, he mistakenly bites on the tail of a living tyrannosaurus. The angry tyrannosaurus then proceeds to attack Cro-Marmot by tearing him to shreds. Cro-Marmot escapes but then gets eaten by a giant pterodactyl.
3	"Ski Patrol"	Jason Sadler	Kenn Navarro, Warren Graff, Ken Pontac, Jason Sadler
Lumpy makes an instructional video for new members of the ski patrol.
4	"YouTube Live Episode"	Kenn Navarro	Warren Graff, Kenn Navarro, Ken Pontac, Jeff Biancalana, David Winn
Several characters are seen inside a crane machine prize game. Cuddles is picked up but falls down. He is later brought back up, but the crane violently trashes his body inside the machine, until he eventually dies. The remaining characters panic and frantically try to escape out of the crane machine.
5	"The Carpal Tunnel of Love"	Kenn Navarro	Kenn Navarro, David Ichioka
A Fall Out Boy music video featuring Happy Tree Friends characters. Cuddles attempts to express his love to Giggles, however, Lumpy gets in the way and ends up killing everyone (including himself).
6	"Intimate Spotlight"	Rhode Montijo	Warren Graff
A reporter interviews Cro-Marmot. She asks questions to him, but all to no response due to Cro-Marmot being frozen. They then run out of time, and as the credits roll, the reporter fumes over getting no response, even swearing at the crew.
7	"False Alarm"	Kenn Navarro	Kenn Navarro, Warren Graff, Ken Pontac
An episode made for the Happy Tree Friends: False Alarm video game. After getting impaled by a truckload of candy canes due to his candy addiction, Nutty is sent to the hospital. He is then sent to an asylum, where he eventually recovers from his addiction. Lifty and Shifty, who Nutty had bought the truckload of candy from, attempt to sell him more candy, but Nutty rejects. They then offer to sell him a video game, which he buys. He eventually becomes addicted to video games, but his game console powers down after playing it for what seems like a whole year to us. Nutty then sees Lifty and Shifty with a van full of video games and chases them with Cuddles' car, killing Petunia in the process. He then crashes into Lifty and Shifty's van, killing them and The Mole. Nutty then discovers all the video games destroyed but sees a candy cane. He licks it and starts laughing crazily, reverting to his candy addiction.
8	"Asbestos I Can Do"	Kenn Navarro	Warren Graff, Kenn Navarro, Ken Pontac, Jeff Biancalana, David Winn
Lumpy sits on a rocking chair, knitting a warmer for his antlers.
9	"Under the Skin"	Kenn Navarro	Warren Graff, Kenn Navarro, Ken Pontac, Jeff Biancalana, David Winn
A documentary on Happy Tree Friends.
10	"Milk Pong"	TBA	TBA
An interactive video featuring Nutty and Lumpy playing milk pong.
11	"Lumpy's Lame Card Trick"	TBA	TBA
An interactive video featuring Lumpy performing a lame card trick.
12	"YouTube Copyright School"	Kenn Navarro	TBA
Russell learns about the dangers of copyright infringement.
13	"Oh Xmas Tree"	TBA	TBA
Cuddles, Giggles, Toothy, and Lumpy sing O Tannenbaum.
14	"Hot Tub Shake"	TBA	TBA
Disco Bear, Cuddles, and Giggles hang out in a swimming pool until Flippy electrocutes them to death with a toaster.
15	"Cubtron Z"	Rob Shaw	Rob Shaw, Warren Graff, Ken Pontac, Kenn Navarro
Pop revives Cub by putting his brain into a giant robot after his son gets killed by a street sweeper.
16	"YouTube 101: Subscriptions"	TBA	TBA
Cuddles learns about subscribing to Disco Bear's channel and unsubscribing.
17	"Still Alive - Blood Donor"	TBA	TBA
Giggles is at the hospital and needs a blood transfusion.
18	"Too Much Scream Time"	Kenn Navarro	Ken Pontac, Warren Graff, Kenn Navarro
Pop needs to go to the bathroom, and leaves Cub to watch a show not meant for kids or tweens on the TV.
19	"Happy Train Friends"	Kenn Navarro	Ken Pontac, Warren Graff, Kenn Navarro
The Big Crossover with Dumb Ways to Die! Nutty keeps on mistaking Putz for a jellybean, Lumpy is completely ignoring the tracks, the other people on the train are Toothy, Flaky, Doofus, and Stumble, and other roles include Handy and Botch.

=== Smoochies (2001–2003; 2008) ===
1. Cuddles' Smoochie (December 2000)
2. Toothy's Easter Smoochie (April 2001)
3. Valentine's Smoochie (February 2002)
4. Nutty's Party Smoochie (May 2002)
5. Petunia's Summer Smoochie (August 2002)
6. Pop's BBQ Smoochie (July 2003)
7. Flaky's Baseball Smoochie (October 2003)
8. Sniffles' Science Smoochie (October 2003)
9. Mime's Olympic Smoochie (August 13, 2008)
10. Halloween Smoochie (October 11, 2008)
11. Christmas Smoochie (December 3, 2008)

=== Blurbs (2001, 2009-2015) ===
These are videos that feature an original episode that has been done over with a series of speech bubbles that either state a fact relating to a scene, make fun of a goof, or tell a joke in a similar style to Mystery Science Theater 3000. Additionally, a majority of the episodes that were originally produced in a 4:3 format (standard definition) are remade in a 16:9 format (high definition).

Mondo Media aired "Blurbed" versions of the following episodes:

1. Spin Fun Knowin' Ya (November 2001)
2. Class Act (December 11, 2009)
3. We're Scrooged! (January 5, 2010)
4. Blind Date (January 29, 2010)
5. Just Desert (May 19, 2010)
6. Can't Stop Coffin (October 15, 2010)
7. Stealing the Spotlight (December 26, 2010)
8. Wrath of Con (July 21, 2011)
9. Nuttin' But the Tooth (April 4, 2012)
10. Eyes Cold Lemonade (December 12, 2012)
11. Shard at Work (December 14, 2012)
12. The Way You Make Me Wheel (January 9, 2013)
13. Take a Hike (February 8, 2013)
14. Let It Slide (June 27, 2013)
15. Brake the Cycle (July 11, 2013)
16. All Flocked Up (August 1, 2013)
17. I Nub You (September 12, 2013)
18. Something Fishy (September 28, 2013)
19. Without a Hitch (October 24, 2013)
20. Swelter Skelter (December 13, 2013)
21. Ski Ya, Wouldn't Wanna Be Ya (January 2, 2014)
22. Suck It Up (April 11, 2014)
23. Peas in a Pod (July 8, 2014)
24. See You Later, Elevator (September 10, 2014)
25. Keepin' It Reel (November 25, 2014)
26. Hello Dolly (January 8, 2015)
27. Read 'em and Weep (April 28, 2015)
28. Icy You (September 18, 2015)
29. Remains to Be Seen (October 27, 2015)

=== Kringles (2002–2004) ===
1. Kringle Bells (November 2002)
2. A Kringle Feast (November 2002)
3. Kringle Karoling (November 2002)
4. Kringle Presents (November 2002)
5. Oh Kringle Tree (November 2002)
6. Frosty Kringle (December 17, 2002)
7. Strain Kringle (2003-04)
8. Chill Kringle (2003-04)
9. Sight Kringle (2003-04)
10. Star Kringle (2004)

=== Ka-Pow! (2003–2005; 2008) ===
No.	Title	Directed by	Written by	Original release date
1	"Buddhist Monkey: Enter the Garden"	Alan Lau	Warren Graff, Alan Lau, Rhode Montijo, and Kenn Navarro	October 14, 2003
2	"Mole in the City"	Roque Ballesteros	Story by : Warren Graff, Alan Lau, Kenn Navarro, Kan Pontac, Brad Rau, and Roque Ballesteros	September 23, 2005
3	"Buddhist Monkey: Books of Fury"	Alan Lau	Warren Graff, Alan Lau, Rhode Montijo, and Kenn Navarro	August 3, 2004
4	"Buddhist Monkey: Three Courses of Death"	Alan Lau	Roque Ballesteros, Warren Graff, Alan Lau, Kenn Navarro, and Kan Pontac	September 23, 2008
5	"W.A.R. Journal: Operation: Tiger Bomb"	Brad Rau	Warren Graff, Alan Lau, Kenn Navarro, Kan Pontac, and Brad Rau	September 2, 2008
6	"Splendid's SSSSSuper Squad: Mirror Mirror"	Roque Ballesteros	Roque Ballesteros, Warren Graff, Alan Lau, Kenn Navarro, and Kan Pontac	November 18, 2008

=== HTF Break (2005–2009, 2012) ===
1. Seize the Day
2. Chore Loser
3. Deck the Halls (October 4, 2005)
4. We Wish You (October 4, 2005)
5. Happy New Year (September 1, 2005)
6. Take Your Seat (October 20, 2005)
7. Moppin Up (September 1, 2005)
8. Bite Sized (September 1, 2005)
9. Pop & Corn (January 26, 2006)
10. Butter Me Up (October 20, 2005)
11. Cheesy Does It (October 27, 2005)
12. Tunnel Vision (September 1, 2005)
13. Claw (April 18, 2012)

=== Love Bites (2009, 2012) ===
1. Cold Hearted (January 29, 2009)
2. Sea of Love (February 9, 2009)
3. I Heart U (February 10, 2009)
4. On My Mind (February 3, 2012)
5. My Better Half (February 14, 2012)
