= Water Way to Go =

Water Way to Go may refer to:

- An episode in the 2nd season of Bump in the Night
- An episode in the 2nd season of Happy Tree Friends
