= Housewarming party (disambiguation) =

A housewarming party is a party traditionally held soon after moving into a new residence.

Housewarming party or Housewarming may also refer to:

- "The Housewarming Party", a 2004 episode of Green Wing
- "House Warming" (Happy Tree Friends), a 2000 web series episode
- "Housewarming" (Ray Donovan), a 2013 television episode
- "Housewarming" (Schitt's Creek), a 2019 television episode
