= Dana Belben =

American actress

- Born: United States
- Education: San Luis Obispo High School
- Occupation: Voice actress

Dana Belben is an American voice actress.

== Career ==
Belben worked as story editor on Happy Tree Friends, as well as providing the original voices for Giggles, Petunia, and Cub.

She was the script coordinator for Surf's Up and provided the voice of Edna Maverick in the movie. Belben also provided additional voices in the Open Season series. She was the visual effects coordinator on clothing and hair for Cloudy with a Chance of Meatballs.

She graduated from San Luis Obispo High School in 1995.
