= Happy Tree Friends: False Alarm =

2008 video game

- Developer: Stainless Games
- Publisher: Sega
- Director: Kenn Navarro
- Producer: Jana Canellos
- Designer: Simone McDermott
- Programmer: Ben Lyons
- Writer: Ken Pontac
- Series: Happy Tree Friends
- Platforms: Microsoft Windows; Xbox 360
- Release: June 25, 2008
- Genre: Puzzle
- Mode: Single player

Happy Tree Friends: False Alarm is a video game based on the Flash cartoon series Happy Tree Friends developed by independent software developer Stainless Games and published by Sega. It was scheduled to be released in fall 2007 and then April 2008, but was delayed and released on June 25, 2008, for Microsoft Windows and Xbox 360.

== Description and gameplay ==
Happy Tree Friends: False Alarm is an action-adventure game utilizing a "physics-based reactive environment". It is similar in some regards to Lemmings. In the game, players control almost everybody. Stages include a mine shaft, candy factory, hospital, and a museum. There is also an exclusive episode in the game, however, it was eventually uploaded onto the HTF official website and can now be viewed on YouTube.

The game itself features a HUD with Lumpy in it, four ability icons (Fire: burning objects, scaring the Happy Tree Friends along; Nitro: destroying obstacles; Water: Freezing objects and Happy Tree Friends; and Action: allows interactivity with the environment), and an ability meter, which prevents over-use of any ability (on the top-left), there is also, on the top-right a fire alarm with a meter around it, which has a gold, silver, bronze, and 'fail' zone, which relates to the end reward upon completion (or, if appropriate, lack of completion) of a level. The Lemming-like Happy Tree Friends who are being rescued, have their own icons (up to five) at the top of the screen in the HUD, with a health bar to indicate their condition. If the icon is frozen, it means the character is currently frozen. If the character's portrait is black and has flames coming from it, that means that the character is currently on fire. If there is a large red X through the portrait, it means they are dead.

In the Xbox 360 version there are 12 achievements and 200 Gamerscore available. The game also sports a Leaderboard system for Xbox Live and the PC, the leaderboard is the records that have been achieved around the world, the filters for the leaderboards are: "Level", which consists of all levels, and every individual level; "Period", which is either "All Time", "Monthly", or "Weekly"; and "Filter", which filters between everyone on the leaderboards (starting at #1), friends only, showing only the player and their friends, and My Score, which shows the player's score in relation to other players. The Leaderboards allows them to scroll up and down commands, and a refresh command.

== Animated short ==
An exclusive episode was made under the same title for the Happy Tree Friends: False Alarm video game, with the first part accessed at the start of the game, and the full episode accessed after completing the game. It was later uploaded to the Happy Tree Friends website and YouTube.

=== Synopsis ===
After getting impaled by a truckload of candy canes due to his candy addiction, Nutty is sent to the hospital. He is then sent to an asylum, where he eventually recovers from his addiction. Lifty and Shifty, who Nutty had bought the truckload of candy from, attempt to sell him more candy, but Nutty rejects. They then offer to sell him a video game, which he buys. He eventually becomes addicted to video games (as represented by his candy attire now being replaced with video game controllers), but his game console overheats after playing it for too long. Nutty then sees Lifty and Shifty with a van full of video games and chases them with Cuddles' car, killing Petunia in the process. He then crashes into Lifty and Shifty's van, killing them and The Mole. Nutty then discovers all the video games destroyed, but sees a candy cane. He licks it and starts laughing crazily, reverting to his candy addiction.

== Reception ==
Reception

Aggregate score
Aggregator	Score	
Aggregator	PC	Xbox 360
Metacritic	41/100	51/100

Review scores
Publication	Score	
Publication	PC	Xbox 360
Eurogamer	N/A	4/10
GamesMaster	N/A	37%
GameSpot	N/A	4.5/10
IGN	6.2/10	6.2/10
Official Xbox Magazine (UK)	N/A	6/10
Official Xbox Magazine (US)	N/A	4.5/10
PC Zone	19%	N/A
TeamXbox	N/A	6.5/10

The Xbox 360 version received "mixed" reviews, while the PC version received "generally unfavorable reviews", according to the review aggregation website Metacritic.
