= Happy Tree Friends =

Adult Flash-animated web series

- Genre: Adult animation; Black comedy; Splatter
- Created by: Aubrey Ankrum; Rhode Montijo; Kenn Navarro
- Developed by: Rhode Montijo; Kenn Navarro; Warren Graff
- Showrunners: Rhode Montijo; Ken Navarro; Aubrey Ankrum; Warren Graff
- Directed by: Rhode Montijo; Kenn Navarro
- Creative director: Dean MacDonald
- Starring: Kenn Navarro; Nica Lorber; Rhode Montijo; David Winn; Dana Belben; Ellen Connell; Lori Jee; Warren Graff; Aubrey Ankrum; Liz Stuart; Jeff Biancalana; Peter Herrmann; Michael "Lippy" Lipman; Mark Giambruno; Francis Carr; Renée T. MacDonald; Ken Pontac
- Composers: Ashsha Kin; Jim Lively; Winn Winn Situation; Kadet Kuhne; Jonathan Bach; Jerome Rossen
- Countries of origin: United States; Canada
- No. of seasons: 6
- No. of episodes: 95 (list of episodes)

Production
- Executive producers: John Evershed; Deirdre O'Malley; Edward Noeltner
- Producer: David Ichioka
- Running time: 1–5 minutes
- Production company: Mondo Media

Original release
- Network: Mondo Media; YouTube (2007–present)
- Release: December 2000 – present

Happy Tree Friends (HTF) is an adult-oriented Flash-animated web series created by Aubrey Ankrum, Rhode Montijo, and Kenn Navarro, and developed by Montijo, Navarro, and Warren Graff for Mondo Media. A parody of the kids' show genre, the series follows the misadventures of cute anthropomorphic forest animals, who live initially peaceful lives until they are killed or injured in sudden, usually accidental, and extremely graphically violent incidents. Debuting in December 2000, Happy Tree Friends has achieved a cult following on Mondo's website and YouTube channel and expanded into a multimedia franchise, which includes the television series of the same name.

== History ==
While working with Mondo Media, Rhode Montijo drew a character on a piece of scrap paper, who would later become Shifty. He then drew a yellow rabbit that bore some resemblance to Cuddles, writing "Resistance is futile" underneath it on a spreadsheet poster. Montijo hung the drawing up in his workstation so other people could see his idea, and eventually, the idea was pitched to and accepted by the Mondo Media executives. In 1999, Mondo gave Aubrey Ankrum, Rhode Montijo, and Kenn Navarro a chance to do a short for them. They came up with a short named "Banjo Frenzy," which featured a dinosaur (an earlier version of Lumpy) murdering three woodland animals, a squirrel, a rabbit, and a beaver (earlier versions of Giggles, Cuddles, and Toothy) with a banjo. From there, Mondo gave them their own Internet series, which they named Happy Tree Friends.

Although the first episodes of Happy Tree Friends were produced in 1999, they weren't released online until sometime in 2000 and became an unexpected success, getting over 15 million hits each month, along with screenings at film festivals.

Mondo Media CEO John Evershed attributes the success of the series to animator Kenn Navarro:

"He had a clear vision for that show and he's just a brilliant animator. He has created something that is pretty universal. I envision kids watching Happy Tree Friends 20 or 30 years from now the same way that they watch Tom and Jerry now. So really it's Kenn Navarro."

In 2014, after the episode "Dream Job" was released, Mondo Media announced plans to produce a feature film based on the series. However, in 2016, Kenn Navarro tweeted that he was unaware of work being done on a film, with his team being "in talk to do more shorts." Later, when a fan asked Kenn Navarro about the film, he replied, "a treatment that [I] and the writers did was all the work (that [I] know of) for the movie."

On December 22, 2016, Mondo Media released five all-new episodes for purchase online. Bundled as a set named "Happy Tree Friends: Still Alive," the episodes came with some additional bonus material such as background designs, animated storyboards, the animation process, and a writer's session video. Upon purchase, buyers were able to download the DRM-free video files to their computer. In January 2017, Kenn Navarro tweeted, "As I understand, sales were OK but fell below what was expected."

On August 17, 2023, it was announced that a new Happy Tree Friends episode titled "Too Much Scream Time" would be released on September 27, 2023, to tie into the downloadable content for the shoot 'em up video game The Crackpet Show (titled The Crackpet Show: Happy Tree Friends Edition), which was released on the same day. On October 18, 2024, a new episode titled "Happy Train Friends" was released as a crossover with Dumb Ways to Die.

== Premise ==
Happy Tree Friends centers on the lives of anthropomorphic, multicolored woodland animals. It intentionally misleads first-time viewers into thinking it is kids' animated edutainment series, with the show's regular opening and closing sequences being in the form of the Little Golden Books, (Note: Kenn Navarro [@ChainKnuckle] (February 15, 2015). "@gagedude1 @Htf432 @devthedoodler @happytreefriend Good eye! All the openning [sic] and credits for the show are based on Golden Books designs." (Tweet) – via Twitter.) and all main characters (except Lumpy and Sniffles) sharing a Care Bears-esque design (pie-eyes, heart-shaped noses, mitten hands, and boot-shaped feet). Each episode starts peacefully with the characters living their lives normally, with activities ranging from childish to grown-up, but a sudden event unintentionally (or sometimes intentionally) caused by another animal leads to many of the characters being subjected to extreme and graphic violence. Each character suffers brutal pain, murder, or mutilation by the end of each episode but always returns alive and well by the next.

== Episodes ==
Season	Episodes	Originally released		
Season	Episodes	First released	Last released	Network
1	27	December 2000	June 22, 2001	Mondo Media
2	27	September 23, 2002	May 2006	Mondo Media
3	25	October 4, 2007	March 29, 2013	Mondo Media
4	9	June 14, 2013	March 6, 2014	Mondo Media
5	5	December 7, 2016	December 22, 2016	Mondo Media
6	2	March 15, 2026	September 4, 2026	Mondo Media

A total of 134 segments were released across ninety-five web episodes and the thirteen episodes (39 segments) of the television series.

=== Television series ===
The television series was first shown at Comic-Con 2006, while some of the episodes were shown on the website a few weeks prior to the show's television premiere. The television series would premiere on October 3, 2006, at midnight on G4's late-night block, Barbed Wire Biscuit (later renamed Midnight Spank). The web series also aired on the network's animation anthology series; Happy Tree Friends and Friends and G4's Late Night Peepshow.

The Canadian channel Razer (now MTV2) aired the show in syndication with then-sibling television network Citytv, and then OLN. Internationally, the series was broadcast on MTV in Europe and Latin America, and Animax in South Africa.

== Characters and cast ==
=== Main characters ===
- Cuddles – A yellow rabbit who has big ears, pink cheeks, and a tiny fluff of fur on his head that looks like his tail, along with a pair of pink bunny slippers. He is sometimes shown to be rebellious and often does extremely dangerous things, while he is cute and cuddly at other times. He is considered the series' unofficial mascot and has the highest death count in the series. His deaths usually involve his body being sliced apart, vehicles, and his intestines. He is voiced by Kenn Navarro.
- Giggles – A pink chipmunk with a small red bow on her head. She was the first female Tree Friend introduced. Her early design depicted her as a blue squirrel. Her deaths usually involve being crushed, her chest, and her head. She is generally considered a girly girl along with her best friend, Petunia. She is known for being featured as a romantically interested date of many of the show's male characters (except for Disco Bear, who she loathes) and has a moderate survival rate compared to many of the other main characters. If the pilot "Banjo Frenzy" is counted, she holds the distinction of being the first character in the series to die. She has been voiced by 3 actresses since her debut: Dana Belben (Season 1–2), Ellen Connell (TV Series–Season 4), and Lori Jee (for a few episodes of Season 3).
- Toothy – A purple beaver with freckles and huge buckteeth unlike the others (hence the name "Toothy"). He is friends with Cuddles. His deaths mostly pertain to his eyes and sharp objects. Many people consider him the most undeveloped character in the show or a "redshirt". Toothy also holds the distinction of being the first character to die in the series (if not counting the pilot, "Banjo Frenzy"). He is voiced by Warren Graff.
- Lumpy – A blue moose with mismatched antlers. He is extremely dim-witted, which often leads to the deaths of many other characters and sometimes his own, but ironically, he has had more jobs than any of the other Tree Friends. His early design in "Banjo Frenzy" portrayed him as a dinosaur instead of a moose, and also presented him as quick to anger and having murderous tendencies, both of which were removed with his first appearance in the series proper. He is the tallest of the main characters and is one of two main characters to not use the basic body shape. He is usually portrayed as an adult, or at least older than the other characters. He is usually considered as the show's main character, as he has appeared in the most episodes, had the most starring roles, has the most occupations of any character, survived more often than most of the other main characters, and has killed the most characters of the main characters. Most of his kills are unintentional and a result of his stupidity, although he has also been shown to either lack taking responsibility for those accidental deaths or even intentionally killed some. When he dies, his deaths often involve machinery, animals, and his own mistakes. He was first voiced by Rhode Montijo (Seasons 1–2) and was later voiced by David Winn (Seasons 2–4).
- Petunia – A blue skunk with a pink flower head accessory and a tree air freshener necklace. She is generally considered a girly girl along with her best friend, Giggles. In later seasons, she has a severe case of obsessive–compulsive disorder and has an unhealthy need to keep everything clean. Her deaths usually involve her head and household appliances. She has been voiced by 3 actresses since her debut: Dana Belben (Seasons 1–2), Ellen Connell (Season 3–4, TV Series), and Lori Jee (for a few episodes of Season 3).
- Handy – An orange beaver with amputated hands that are wrapped in bandages (which he is ironically named after), a tool belt, and a yellow hard hat. His amputated hands cause him trouble that often frustrates him, and his disabilities result in the death of either him or other Tree Friends. He is the Tree Friend who most often does construction work, which he somehow manages to do without trouble as long as it is off-screen. He also briefly had boots. His deaths usually involve glass, his organs, impalement, being cut in half, and his head. He is voiced by Warren Graff.
- Nutty – A jittery green squirrel with a crazy candy addiction, a constant act of giggling, and a candy outfit consisting of three lollipops on his head and a candy cane on his chest. He is shown to be quite obsessive about anything made of artificial sugar, especially candy, and goes to great heights to try to get them, often at the expense of himself or others. He also occasionally mistakes certain objects, such as Christmas lights, to be candy. Eating sugar makes him experience an exaggerated sugar rush. He has one small black pupil on his left eye, while his right, which is afflicted by a case of lazy eye, has a green iris (much like the eyes of Flippy's bad side). His deaths usually involve his mouth, getting impaled, crushed, split apart, or shredded, and breathing problems. Michael "Lippy" Lipman voices him.
- Sniffles – A brainy blue anteater with big glasses and a mouth on his snout. He is easily the most intelligent character in the series but sometimes lacks common sense. For example, when he spilled a cup of milk, he made a time traveling machine instead of just cleaning up and fill a new one (from the episode "Blast from the Past"). He makes many inventions, but these tend to backfire at inopportune times, sometimes resulting in his death or the death of other characters. He often attempts to eat a family of ants, who manage to save themselves while killing their natural predator in some of the most graphic and sadistic ways possible. His deaths usually involve his tongue, head, limbs, organs and his inventions. He is voiced by Liz Stuart.
- Pop and Cub – Two tan father-and-son bears. Pop wears a robe and is almost always seen smoking a tobacco pipe, while Cub wears a diaper and a beanie with a propeller. Cub has appeared without Pop in some episodes and vice versa. Although well-meaning to his son, Pop usually causes unintentional misfortune to his son casually or negligently, ending with Cub and others injured or dead – sometimes this negligence gets himself killed as well. When he witnesses his son's death and isn't being negligent, however, he does break down due to these events. Other times it is Cub that gets himself into danger. Pop has a high survival rate compared to many of the show's other characters. Pop is voiced by Aubrey Ankrum; Cub has been voiced by 3 actresses since his debut: Dana Belben (Seasons 1–2), Ellen Connell (Seasons 2–4), and Lori Jee (for 1 episode of Season 3), which are the same voice actresses for Giggles and Petunia.
- Flaky – A red, nervous porcupine with spiny dandruff on her quills (hence the name "Flaky"). She is paranoid with an extreme fear of dying and a frequent tendency to laugh nervously, although it has not often stopped her from willingly participating in activities with her friends. She is one of the most popular characters in the series given her often understandably cowardly personality due to how easily the characters can die in the series. Her deaths usually involve getting skinned, burned, or even eaten, and can also involve animals. She is voiced by Nica Lorber.
- The Mole – A mute, blind purple mole with black glasses, a purple turtleneck sweater that covers his mouth, a cane, and a mole near his nose. Due to his blindness, some of his actions get him and the other Tree Friends killed. He often does things blind people should not be doing, such as reading and driving and also holds various occupations that require sight that he often screws up. In his spinoff episode, his archenemy was a noir-type rat villain simply known as The Rat. The Mole does not die very often, but when he does, his deaths usually involve his head, getting impaled or crushed, explosions, and losses of body parts.
- Disco Bear – A golden bear with an afro and '70s-style clothing. In most episodes, he is seen flirting with mainly Giggles and Petunia, who he fails at flirting with given their dislikes and even ridicules of him. He is also shown to have extreme health issues despite his high frequency to dance. His deaths usually involve his head, his eyes, and explosions. He is voiced by Peter Hermann.
- Russell – A teal sea otter. While he has the appearance of a stereotypical pirate and the pirate catchphrase "Yar!", he is not actually a pirate and is more often seen doing innocent water-related activities such as fishing or sailing. His deaths are usually by vehicles, sharp objects, or nautical-themed incidents, such as being eaten by an orca, impaled through his eye socket on his own ship's mast, or speared through the mouth by a swordfish. He was first voiced by Jeff Biancalana (Seasons 1–2) and later voiced by Francis Carr (TV Series–Season 4).
- Lifty and Shifty – Two green raccoons who steal whatever they can when possible and cackle together when they find valuable objects to take in the expense of others. Shifty wears a dark green fedora, while Lifty does not. Shifty was the first Tree Friend to be created, way before Cuddles. Even though they are brothers, they often argue, and one brother is prone to turning his back on the other in favor of the loot, but it always ends up backfiring, as the double-crossing brother suffers a karmic death as a result. They have the lowest survival rates of all the characters as they almost always seem to get their comeuppance. Their deaths usually involve machines, vehicles, being mashed together or sliced apart, impalement, and heat. Both were initially voiced by Mark Giambruno (Season 1–2) and were later portrayed by Kenn Navarro (TV Series–Season 4).
- Mime – A purple deer with a white-colored painted face and striped shirt. He means to be entertaining, but this results in others around him getting killed or getting self-killed. He is often seen riding a unicycle while juggling. Being a mime, he does not talk, which normally results in the Tree Friend he is communicating with not understanding him, which in some cases causes many deaths. For example, in the television episode "Who's to Flame?", he tries to tell the fire department that the house is burning down, but since they are talking over the phone, Lumpy the firefighter is unable to understand him before hanging up. Later, seeing more firefighters, Mime tries to communicate with them using body motions, but they still do not understand. His deaths usually involve his head, metallic objects, machinery, and vehicles. His rare instances of audible noises (such as choking or gagging) are provided by Sarah Castelblanco.
- Cro-Marmot – A yellow-green marmot who wears a leopard-skin loincloth and holds a brown club. He is frozen in a giant block of ice (rendering him mute). and lives in an igloo in a giant snow globe in the forest. Despite being frozen, he can perform many tasks when off-screen, and a few (such as surfing) onscreen. He often drives around in an ice cream truck. He rarely dies in the series, but when he does, his deaths usually involve heat or disasters. While he almost always dies offscreen, his only onscreen death comes in is "Dino-Sore Days", which is animated in the style of an old black-and-white cartoon in the vein of Oswald the Lucky Rabbit or Mickey Mouse; it is also the only episode where Cro-Marmot is not frozen in a block of ice, as the episode takes place in prehistoric times.
- Flippy – A green bear with a soldier uniform bearing an army sergeant insignia. He is a war veteran with a severe case of post-traumatic stress disorder. He is normally a friendly and outgoing character, but whenever he sees or hears anything that reminds the slightest hint of warfare, he flips out (hence the name "Flippy"), thinking he is still in the middle of warfare with nobody but enemy combatants, which generally results in him murdering most or all characters around him. This alter ego is known as "Fliqpy" (as the first "p" in his name is flipped horizontally into a "q") or "Evil Flippy". He is one of the most popular characters in the series and has the highest intentional kill count. He rarely dies in the series, but when he does, his deaths usually involve vehicles, machinery, and explosions, and these deaths mostly happen either when he is in his good side or in self-defense by Lumpy. Kenn Navarro voiced Flippy, while his evil self Fliqpy is voiced by Aubrey Ankrum, who also provided the voice of his good side up until 2006.
- Splendid – A blue flying squirrel with a red superhero mask. As a superhero, he ironically causes only harm and destruction given his poor management of his extraordinary powers and his constant refusal to take responsibility for the deaths he caused. He bears some similarities to Superman, such as his weakness being a green crystalline acorn known as Kryptonut (a parody of Kryptonite) in the television episode "Gems the Breaks", which is also his only onscreen death. His archenemy is an evil doppelgänger of himself known as Splendont. He was first voiced by Rhode Montijo (Seasons 1–2) and later voiced by David Winn (TV Series–Season 4).
- Lammy – A purple sheep with a purple bow and a white sweater representing her wool. Introduced in Q2 2010, she has a supposedly imaginary friend named Mr. Pickels, a sentient pickle who apparently enjoys brutally murdering those around her, ruining her chances to develop full friendships with other people (however, Mr. Pickels' actual sentience is still ambiguous). She is voiced by Renée T. MacDonald.
- Mr. Pickels – A mute anthropomorphic pickle with a top hat and mustache. He acts similar to Evil Flippy, due to his tendency to violently kill anyone nearby simply for his own enjoyment. He is also Lammy's "imaginary friend" that only she can see in animated form. However, in the web episode "Royal Flush", Giggles is able to see him, in which he also manages to single-handedly kill Flaky. At first, Lammy thinks of him as nice, but he then starts causing chaos, such as from ripping the head off of Petunia's teddy bear to running over Handy with his own truck in their debut appearances in the web episode "A Bit of a Pickle".

=== Minor characters ===
- Buddhist Monkey – A yellow Buddhist monk monkey who has appeared in three episodes, "Enter the Garden", "Books of Fury", and "Three Courses of Death". His enemies, the Generic Tree Ninjas, are bears that try to destroy what he cherishes. He is voiced by Jeff Biancalana.
- Generic Tree Friends - The Generic Tree Friends are incidental characters who are often used in masses. Typically, only their silhouettes and facial features are seen.
- Truffles - A bluish-gray boar. Truffles was one of two characters, the other being Lammy, who were candidates for the series' "Vote or Die" event, where fans could vote on which of the two would become a main character in the series; Lammy won the contest, although Truffles did appear since in cameo roles. He makes his debut in the episode "A Bit of a Pickle", but most prominently appears in "Clause for Concern". While he is not a main character, he has been killed in three episodes, by Lumpy in "All in Vein" and (with the assist of Toothy) in "An inconvenient tooth" and Flippy in "By the Seat of your Pants". It was officially stated that he is a bully, indicating that he could be an anti-hero.
- Unicornius - A crudely drawn white unicorn with a rainbow horn and tail. He was one of two winners in the first of two "Truffles' Video Bomb" competitions where fans could submit their own characters for a chance for them to be featured as a cameo in an official episode. He appeared as a cameo in "Pet Peeve". This character is based on the song by Oliver Age 24.
- Tricksy - A white and brown ferret with a knack for pranks. He was one of two winners in the first of two "Truffles' Video Bomb" competitions where fans could submit their own characters for a chance for them to be featured as a cameo in an official episode. He appeared as a cameo in "Pet Peeve".
- Rudy - A purple ram dressed as the character Ryu from the Street Fighter video game series. He was the winner of the second of two "Truffles' Video Bomb" competitions where fans could submit their own characters for a chance for them to be featured as a cameo in an official episode. He appeared as a cameo in "A Vicious Cycle". This character was created by Grubby21.
- FatKat - Only appearing as a cameo in the Happy Tree Friends Break short "Take Your Seat", FatKat is a blue cat who is based on the mascot of FatKat Animation, the now-defunct animation studio that worked on the Happy Tree Friends TV series.
- Fall Out Boy - The real-life alternative rock band Fall Out Boy made a cameo appearance as Tree Friend versions of themselves in the music video for their song "The Carpal Tunnel of Love", which was animated by the crew of Happy Tree Friends. All four members die in the video when they are decapitated by a tow cable.

== Reception ==
=== Controversy ===
The series has drawn criticism due to concern that children would be influenced by its violent content due to the series appearing as if it were made for children. An example of this happened in 2005, when American author and journalist Katherine Ellison expressed her feelings about it to The Washington Post after witnessing her six-year-old son watch it. She believed that the series should be regulated since she felt it would have an impact on young children's minds.

The series has also been controversial with several local and federal government agencies in Russia. In 2008, the Russian Media Culture Protection Department (Rossvyazokhrankultura), a regulatory body for TV in Russia, issued a warning to Russian TV channel 2×2 about them airing the series along with The Adventures of Big Jeff, claiming that they both promote "violence and brutality." This "violence and brutality" was claimed to harm the psychic health, moral development, and social morality of children, all of this being a violation of the license agreement. The department warned 2×2 to remove them in order to avoid legal issues. The owners of 2×2 voiced their disagreement but reluctantly fulfilled the request. Later on, in 2021, the Oktyabrsky District Court in Saint Petersburg banned the series along with some anime films, claiming that the series "contains elements of cruelty" and that it "is designed in a style common for American animation" and that "watching the animated series undoubtedly harms young children's spiritual and moral education and development and contradicts the humanistic nature of upbringing inherent in Russia."

=== Accolades ===
Show	Year	Category	Episode
Annecy International Animated Film Festival	2003	Best Animated Short Film Made for the Internet	"Eye Candy"
Annecy International Animated Film Festival	2007	Best Television Series for Adults	"From Hero to Eternity"
Ottawa International Animation Festival	2004	Best Animated Short Film Made for the Internet	"Out on a Limb"
Ottawa International Animation Festival	2005	Best Animated Short Film Made for the Internet	"Mole in the City"
Ottawa International Animation Festival	2007	Best Television Series for Adults	"Autopsy Turvy (Double Whammy, Part 2)"

== In other media ==
Fall Out Boy's 2007 music video for their song "The Carpal Tunnel of Love" was directed by Kenn Navarro and stars characters from the series. The band members also make a cameo as animated characters.

A mobile video game named Happy Tree Friends: Spin Fun was released in 2005. It was developed and published by Daydream Software.

A video game titled Happy Tree Friends: False Alarm was released on June 25, 2008. It was developed by Stainless Games and Sega for Xbox Live Arcade on the Xbox 360 and the PC. An iOS game titled Happy Tree Friends: Deadeye Derby was released on January 16, 2014.

On August 17, 2023, Mondo Media and Ravenage Games announced a crossover between Mondo's Happy Tree Friends franchise and Ravenage's shoot 'em up video game The Crackpet Show as a downloadable expansion titled The Crackpet Show: Happy Tree Friends Edition, which was released on September 27, 2023, for the Steam, GOG.com, and Epic Games Store digital distribution services, as well as the Xbox One, Xbox Series X and S, PlayStation 4, PlayStation 5 and Nintendo Switch gaming consoles. (Note: The Crackpet Show official (Retrieved 25 August 2023 thecrackpetshow.com website))

=== Spin-offs ===
A spin-off series called Ka-Pow! was released in September 2008 and is an anthology of action-oriented stories starring The Mole, Flippy, Splendid, and Buddhist Monkey. A total of six episodes have been produced.

In 2014, Kenn Navarro created D_Void, a show similar to Happy Tree Friends. Two episodes had been produced for the series, which were later uploaded to the Mondo Media YouTube channel in mid-2020.
