= Mark Giambruno =

American animator

- Born: Placerville, California, USA
- Occupations: Art Director; 3D Modeler; Writer
- Known for: 3D Graphics & Animation; Mechwarrior 3 JoJo's Bizarre Adventure
- Website: Binary Arts

Mark Giambruno was a 3D artist, art director and writer. As an early employee of Mondo Media, he worked on many of their game projects and contract game cinematics. He also voiced the Lifty & Shifty characters for the popular internet show Happy Tree Friends in the early episodes of the series (roles that would later be inherited by Kenn Navarro). He is the author of two books on 3D graphics and has also done the English rewrite on over 40 US-licensed manga and light novels.

== Biography ==
Born in Placerville, CA, he grew up in Sacramento, CA before moving to the San Francisco Bay area for a number of years. In college, he majored in art and electronics, and began a career in computer graphics in 1990. After a few years doing presentation and web graphics, he transitioned into video games, and worked as artist, writer, art director, project manager or consultant on 21 different game titles, including The Incredibles: When Danger Calls, Mechwarrior 3, Zork: Nemesis and The Daedalus Encounter.

At the same time, he became involved in a number of writing projects, including the monthly Animata column for InterActivity magazine and books on 3D graphics. In the mid-nineties, he was attracted to the world of Japanese anime and manga, and amassed a large collection of books and DVDs. He even studied the language, and eventually started to work on adaptations of Japanese novels, manga and anime. While still at Mondo, he worked with anime legend Toshihiro Kawamoto of Cowboy Bebop fame on some character designs for an unreleased internet minishow. He also worked for Super Techno Arts (publisher of the JoJo's Bizarre Adventure anime series). Most recently, he had worked for Region Free (Japanese artist referral and contract translation service) where he worked on graphics and website work through his Binary Arts company.

== Selected Games ==
- Critical Path (creative director)
- The Daedalus Encounter (co-writer, art/animation director)
- Zork: Nemesis (3D modeler)
- Blade Runner (3D modeler)
- Mechwarrior 3 (cinematic art/animation director)
- Hot Shots Golf 2 (3D modeler)
- Star Fleet Command 1 & 2 (art director/3D modeler)
- Zoombinis Island Odyssey (art/animation director)
- The Incredibles: When Danger Calls (producer)

== Written works ==
3D GRAPHICS/GAMES

- 3D Graphics & Animation: From Starting Up to Standing Out
- 3D Graphics & Animation: Second Edition (also published in Russian)
- The Official Guide to The Daedalus Encounter (also published in Japanese)
- Animata (monthly column in InterActivity magazine)

JAPANESE MANGA/ANIME/NOVEL ADAPTATIONS

- Nura: Rise of the Yokai Clan (manga vol. 1–8, 10-11+)
- Hayate the Combat Butler (manga vol. 1-18+)
- Shakugan no Shana (manga vol. 2–3)
- Shakugan no Shana: Fight Day! (novel 2)
- Train_Man: Densha Otoko (manga vol. 1–3)
- JoJo's Bizarre Adventure (6-volume anime series)
- Fullmetal Alchemist Anime Profiles (art book)
- Rurouni Kenshin: Voyage to the Moon World (novel)
- Under Cover (unpublished novel)
- Angel's Fang (unpublished novel)
