= Andrea Giambruno =

Italian journalist and TV presenter (born 1981)

- Born: 7 May 1981 (age 45); Milan, Lombardy, Italy
- Occupation: Journalist
- Known for: Domestic partner of Giorgia Meloni
- Partner: Giorgia Meloni (2015–2023)
- Children: 1

Andrea Salvatore Giambruno (born 7 May 1981) is an Italian television journalist, presenter, and writer. He worked for Mediaset on TGcom24, Studio Aperto, and in 2023 hosted Diario del giorno on Rete 4. He became widely known in 2023 after off-air recordings broadcast by Striscia la notizia prompted criticism and led to his exit from on-air presenting of Diario del giorno.

== Biography ==
Giambruno was born in Milan and studied philosophy at the Università Cattolica del Sacro Cuore. He began his career at local broadcaster Telenova before joining Mediaset, working as a writer and author on current affairs programmes and later as a news presenter on TGcom24 and Studio Aperto.

== Career ==
In 2023 Giambruno became host and author of the TG4 afternoon slot Diario del giorno. After off-air videos aired by Striscia la notizia on 18–19 October 2023, Mediaset stated that he would leave on-screen presenting while continuing editorial coordination for the programme.

=== Television credits ===
- Studio Aperto – presenter and author (Italia 1, 2020–2022)
- TGcom24 – presenter and author
- Diario del giorno – host and author (Rete 4, 2023)

=== As television writer ===
- Matrix (Canale 5)
- Quinta colonna (Rete 4)
- Mattino Cinque (Canale 5)
- Stasera Italia (Rete 4)

== Controversies ==
On 18 and 19 October 2023 Striscia la notizia broadcast off-air recordings from the Diario del giorno studio that drew national attention and criticism for vulgar and sexist remarks. In the days that followed he first stepped back temporarily and later ceased on-air presenting of the show by agreement with Mediaset.

== Private life ==
From 2014 to 2023 Giambruno was in a relationship with Giorgia Meloni, whom he met in 2014 during her participation in a Mediaset programme. In 2016 they had a daughter, Ginevra. When his partner was appointed Prime Minister of Italy in October 2022, Giambruno began accompanying her to many official engagements. He said he had always voted on the left—although he later denied this—and Meloni added that they sometimes argued over issues on which they disagreed; Giambruno was reported to be in favour of same-sex unions and related adoptions, as well as the legalization of cannabis.

On 20 October 2023, following the media attention sparked by some controversies, Prime Minister Giorgia Meloni stated that their relationship had already ended some time earlier.
