= David Winn =

American animator and writer (born 1966)

David Winn (born July 31, 1966) is an American animator, writer and voice actor who works in several animation projects. He worked as an animator in the series Happy Tree Friends, The Fairly OddParents, LeapFrog, and House of Mouse.

He also directed the animated short film Fleeced, which was shown at numerous animation film festivals including the Annecy International Animation Festival.

Winn also replaced Rhode Montijo as the voices of Lumpy the Moose and Splendid the Flying Squirrel in Happy Tree Friends in 2004.
