= Ken Pontac =

American writer

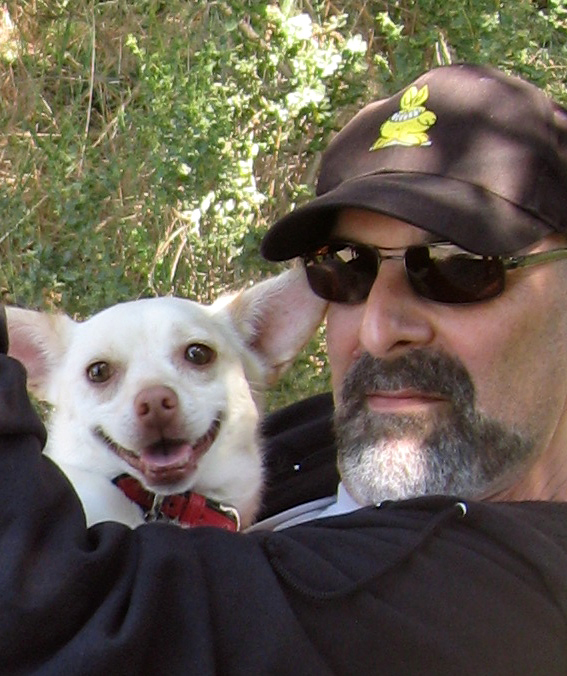
- Pontac in 2009
- Occupation: Screenwriter
- Writing career
- Genre: Gore, Comedy
- Notable works: Happy Tree Friends; ReBoot; LazyTown; Arthur; Toddworld; Ka-Pow! Sonic the Hedgehog
- Website: www.happytreefriends.com

Ken Pontac is an American writer, who has written for ToddWorld, LazyTown and Happy Tree Friends and helped create its spin-off Ka-Pow!. Pontac was also a co-creator of Bump in the Night and a co-writer for the Sonic the Hedgehog series.

== Writing credits ==
=== Television credits ===
- Gumby Adventures (1988)
- Mighty Max (1993)
- Bump in the Night (1994–1995)
- Extreme Dinosaurs (1997)
- The Legend of Calamity Jane (1997)
- Shadow Raiders (1998–1999)
- ReBoot (1999)
- Roswell Conspiracies: Aliens, Myths and Legends (1999)
- Sherlock Holmes in the 22nd Century (1999, 2001)
- Howdi Gaudi (2002)
- LazyTown (2004)
- ¡Mucha Lucha! (2004)
- ToddWorld (2004)
- Happy Tree Friends (2004–2008)
- Krypto the Superdog (2005)
- Pet Alien (2005)
- Growing Up Creepie (2006)
- The Secret Show (2006)
- Iron Man: Armored Adventures (2008)
- Storm Hawks (2008)
- Arthur (2010–2013)
- Generator Rex (2011)
- Matt Hatter Chronicles (2011–2012)
- Transformers: Rescue Bots (2012)
- Octonauts (2012, 2014)
- Slugterra (2012–2016)
- Pac-Man and the Ghostly Adventures (2013–2015)
- Thunderbirds Are Go (2015)
- Luna Petunia (2017)
- Sonic Boom (2017)
- Kong: King of the Apes (2018)
- Woody Woodpecker (2020, 2022)
- Curious George (2020)
- Mighty Express (2021)

=== Video game credits ===
- ClayFighter (1993)
- Primal Rage (1994)
- ClayFighter 63⅓ (1997)
- ClayFighter: Sculptor's Cut (1998)
- MadWorld (2009)
- Sonic Colors (2010)
- Sonic Generations (2011)
- Sonic Lost World (2013)
- Sonic Boom: Shattered Crystal (2014)
- Sonic Boom: Fire & Ice (2016)
- Sonic Forces (2017)
- State of Decay 2 (2018)
- Team Sonic Racing (2019)
- Grand Theft Auto Online (2022)

=== Comic books ===
- Justice League Unlimited #44 (2008)
- Wacky Raceland #1–6 (2016)
