= List of Baby Looney Tunes episodes =

This is a list of episodes of the American animated television series Baby Looney Tunes.

== Series overview ==
Season	Episodes	Originally released	
Season	Episodes	First released	Last released
1	13	September 16, 2002	October 2, 2002
2	13	October 3, 2002	October 28, 2002
3	12	October 29, 2002	December 31, 2002
4	13	April 4, 2005	April 20, 2005
Film		February 11, 2003	

== Episodes ==
=== Season 1 (2002) ===
No. overall	No. in season	Title	Animation timing directed by	Written by	Storyboard by	Story editor(s)	Original release date	Prod. code
1	1	"Taz in Toyland"	Becky Bristow	Julie McNally Cahill & Timothy Cahill	Jeff Allen	Tom Minton	September 16, 2002	TBA
1	1	"A Secret Tweet"	Jill Jacobs	Julie McNally Cahill & Timothy Cahill	Curtis Cim	Tom Minton	September 16, 2002	TBA
When Taz keeps breaking most of his toys, Granny gives him a new one. Taz believes it is broken, but Granny says that it is the toy's job. Song: Born to Sing Granny plans a surprise birthday party for Tweety.
2	2	"Comfort Level"	Chris Clayson	Marilyn Webber	Jeff Baik	Tom Minton	September 17, 2002	TBA
2	2	"Like a Duck to Water"	Larry Leichliter	Marilyn Webber	Vic Dal Chele	Tom Minton	September 17, 2002	TBA
Sylvester loses his blanket so everyone helps him find it. Song: Twinkle, Baby Looney Star (Twinkle, Twinkle, Little Star) Granny gives the babies swimming lessons but Daffy is afraid.
3	3	"School Daze"	Aaron Crippen	Michael Maler & Obie Scott Wade	Lisa Baytos	Tom Minton	September 18, 2002	TBA
3	3	"Things That Go Bugs in the Night"	Randy Ludensky	Carter Crocker	Holly Forsyth	Karl Geurs	September 18, 2002	TBA
The babies pretend to go to school. Song: Mary Had a Baby Duck (Mary Had a Little Lamb) Granny leaves and lets Bugs be in charge, since Bugs is the oldest, but Taz goes missing. NOTE: This is the only episode to feature "Mary Had a Baby Duck"
4	4	"Creature from the Chocolate Chip"	Barbara Dourmashkin-Case	Carter Crocker	Mike Borkowski	Karl Geurs	September 19, 2002	TBA
4	4	"Card Bored Box"	Mike Lyman	Michael Maler & Obie Scott Wade	Sandra Frame	Tom Minton	September 19, 2002	TBA
Sylvester eats all the cookies and Daffy tells Granny a monster did it. Song: The Looney Riddle Song (The Riddle Song) Granny gives Bugs, Daffy, Lola and Tweety a cardboard box to play in. They don't like it at first, then they fight over whose game is better, using the box to play in, and at the end, it works for all their games.
5	5	"Time and Time Again"	Holly du Rivage	Michael Maler & Obie Scott Wade	Kathleen Carr	Tom Minton	September 20, 2002	TBA
5	5	"May the Best Taz Win"	Graham Morris	Karl Geurs	Kevin Frank	Karl Geurs	September 20, 2002	TBA
Granny teaches the babies to tell the time. Song: Does Your Tongue Hang Low? (Do Your Ears Hang Low) Bugs and Daffy fight over who's getting Lola on their badminton team.
6	6	"Mine!"	Rex Faraday	Christopher Simmons	Mary Hanley	Tom Minton	September 23, 2002	TBA
6	6	"Sylvester the Pester"	Hilary Phillips	David Slack	Rafael Rosado	Tom Minton	September 23, 2002	TBA
Daffy steals Granny's wallet and claims it as his own. Song: Over the Burrow (Over the Meadow) Sylvester keeps trying to stay out of bed just so he can spend some time with Granny.
7	7	"Cat-Taz-Trophy"	Richard Gasparian	Roger Eschbacher	Llyn Hunter	Tom Minton	September 24, 2002	TBA
7	7	"Duck! Monster! Duck!"	Nelson Recinos	Julie McNally-Cahill & Timothy Cahill	David Smith	Tom Minton	September 24, 2002	TBA
The babies have a car race to win a cookie trophy. Song: If You're Looney (If You're Happy and You Know It) Daffy tells the babies a scary story that really scares them all, then scares them at night.
8	8	"The Brave Little Tweety"	Patrick Gleeson	Carter Crocker	Norma Klingler	Carter Crocker	September 25, 2002	TBA
8	8	"The Puddle Olympics"	Kunio Shimamura	Julie McNally-Cahill & Timothy Cahill	Alex Soto	Tom Minton	September 25, 2002	TBA
The babies make Tweety brave. Song: Foghorn's Talkin' in the Barnyard (I've Been Working on the Railroad) The babies have their own version of the Olympics with a puddle, while Sylvester gets Granny to overcome his fear of water.
9	9	"A Lot Like Lola"	Becky Bristow	Julie McNally Cahill & Timothy Cahill	Irineo Maramba	Tom Minton	September 26, 2002	TBA
9	9	"Mother's Day Madness"	Jill Jacobs	Andrew Robinson	Neal Sternecky	Tom Minton	September 26, 2002	TBA
After misunderstanding a comment by Granny, Lola starts telling everyone their mistakes and saying that they should be like her. Everyone imitates Lola, which annoys her. Song: Baby Elmer Had a Friend (Old McDonald Had a Farm) The babies see who can make better Mother's Day cards.
10	10	"Takers Keepers"	Chris Clayson	Carter Crocker	Art Mawhinney	Carter Crocker	September 27, 2002	TBA
10	10	"To Tell the Tooth"	Larry Leichliter	Michael Maler & Obie Scott Wade	Karl Toerge	Tom Minton	September 27, 2002	TBA
Daffy steals Taz's favorite toy, but it ends up in the trash. Song: D-A-F-F-Y (B-I-N-G-O) After Bugs loses his first tooth, Taz's tooth becomes loose, and Daffy wants to steal it for money.
11	11	"Spinout"	Aaron Crippen	Earl Kress	Mike Milo	Tom Minton	September 30, 2002	TBA
11	11	"Snow Day"	Randy Ludensky	Thomas Hart	Keith Tucker	Tom Minton	September 30, 2002	TBA
Taz loses his ability to spin and the babies help him learn how to once again. Song: Taz's Fridge (London Bridge Is Falling Down) The babies play in the snow and build a snowman called Snowy.
12	12	"Shadow of a Doubt"	Barbara Dourmashkin-Case	Michael Maler & Obie Scott Wade	Declan Moran	Tom Minton	October 1, 2002	TBA
12	12	"Christmas in July"	Mike Lyman	Lisa Medway	Curt Walstead	Julie McNally Cahill & Timothy Cahill	October 1, 2002	TBA
Tweety learns what a shadow is. Song: John Jacob Jingle Elmer Fudd (John Jacob Jingleheimer Schmidt) The babies pretend it's Christmas to surprise Lola when she doesn't have a stethoscope to play doctor.
13	13	"Bruce Bunny"	Holly du Rivage	David Slack	Bob Richardson	Tom Minton	October 2, 2002	TBA
13	13	"Leader of the Pack"	Graham Morris	Carter Crocker	Wendell Washer	Karl Geurs	October 2, 2002	TBA
Daffy makes fun of Bugs so Bugs decides to change his name and look. Song: Baby Bunny (Kookaburra) After being ignored, Daffy starts a club with a secret password.

=== Season 2 (2002) ===
No. overall	No. in season	Title	Animation timing directed by	Written by	Storyboard by	Story editor(s)	Original release date	Prod. code
14	1	"Flower Power"	Rex Faraday	Julie McNally Cahill & Timothy Cahill	Lenord Robinson	Tom Minton	October 3, 2002	TBA
14	1	"Lightning Bugs Sylvester"	Hilary Phillips	Roger Eschbacher	Jeff Allen	Julie McNally Cahill & Timothy Cahill	October 3, 2002	TBA
The babies all want to pick the best flowers for Granny. Song: Looney Tunes Zoo (Lou Lou Skip To My Lou) Sylvester learns to overcome his fear of lightning.
15	2	"Flush Hour"	Richard Gasparian	Thomas Hart	Curtis Cim	Tom Minton	October 4, 2002	TBA
15	2	"I Strain"	Nelson Recinos	Earl Kress	Jeff Baik	Tom Minton	October 4, 2002	TBA
The babies are afraid of the toilet, and don't know what it's for, until they flood it and soon find out that it's an alternative to diapers. Song: Paws and Feathers (Head, Shoulders, Knees and Toes) Petunia can't stop watching TV until a power cut causes the electricity to shut down.
16	3	"The Sandman is Coming"	Patrick Gleeson	Earl Kress	Vic Dal Chele	Tom Minton	October 7, 2002	TBA
16	3	"Some Assembly Required"	Kunio Shimamura	Libby Hinson	Lisa Baytos	Karl Geurs	October 7, 2002	TBA
The babies try to stop the Sandman from coming. Song: Ten Loonies in a Bed (Ten in the Bed) Bugs orders a new toy, but it won't seem to arrive.
17	4	"All Washed Up"	Becky Bristow	Andrew Robinson	Holly Forsyth	Julie McNally Cahill & Timothy Cahill	October 8, 2002	TBA
17	4	"Did Not! Did Too!"	Jill Jacobs	Carter Crocker	Mike Borkowski	Karl Geurs	October 8, 2002	TBA
The babies take a bath, but Taz doesn't want to, so Taz hides. Song: My Bunny Lies Over the Ocean (My Bonnie Lies Over the Ocean) Lola and Bugs get into a big fight and refuse to talk to each other. so Taz, Daffy, Sylvester, and Tweety try to get them to make up.
18	5	"Tea and Basketball"	Chris Clayson	Christopher Simmons	Sandra Frame	Julie McNally Cahill & Timothy Cahill	October 9, 2002	TBA
18	5	"Taz You Like It"	Larry Leichliter	Timothy Cahill & Julie McNally-Cahill	Kathleen Carr	Tom Minton	October 9, 2002	TBA
Sylvester wants to have a tea party with the girls, while Lola wants to play basketball with the boys. Song: Down By The Cage (Down by the Bay) No-one wants to play with Taz, so Taz pretends to hurt himself in order to get attention.
19	6	"Band Together"	Aaron Crippen	Roger Eschbacher	Kevin Frank	Julie McNally Cahill & Timothy Cahill	October 10, 2002	TBA
19	6	"War of the Weirds"	Randy Ludensky	Carter Crocker	Mary Hanley	Karl Geurs	October 10, 2002	TBA
The babies hear Granny play her favourite music so they form a symphony. Song: Oh Where, Oh Where Has My Baby Martian Gone? (Oh Where, Oh Where Has My Little Dog Gone) Baby Marvin pays a visit to the babies, but no-one likes him. Taz befriends Marvin to make him feel welcome, then everyone else feels the same.
20	7	"The Harder They Fall"	Barbara Dourmashkin-Case	Carter Crocker	Rafael Rosado	Karl Geurs	October 11, 2002	TBA
20	7	"Business as Unusual"	Mike Lyman	Michael Maler & Obie Scott Wade	Llyn Hunter	Tom Minton	October 11, 2002	TBA
The babies all want to do rollerskating, except Bugs, who feels embarrassed about his lack of talent, but gives it a shot when everyone falls down. Song: The Hare Hid Under the Fountain (The Bear Went Over the Mountain) When Daffy sees Bugs establish his own lemonade stand, Bugs becomes his partner, but doesn't do his fair share of work, so Daffy competes with his own stand.
21	8	"Mr. McStuffles"	Holly du Rivage	Christopher Simmons	David Smith	Julie McNally Cahill & Timothy Cahill	October 14, 2002	TBA
21	8	"Picture This!"	Graham Morris	Marlowe Weisman	Norma Klingler	Julie McNally Cahill & Timothy Cahill	October 14, 2002	TBA
Daffy tries to keep his old toy, Mr. McStuffles, but he never plays with it and would rather play with something better. Song: Twinkle Baby Looney Star (again) Granny reads the babies a story from a book of fairy tales, but some of the book's pages are missing. The babies decide to recreate the pages of the story with their own drawings. However, Daffy, Sylvester, and Lola end up going a little off point.
22	9	"Hair Cut-Ups"	Hilary Phillips	Earl Kress	Alex Soto	Julie McNally Cahill & Timothy Cahill	October 15, 2002	TBA
22	9	"A Clean Sweep"	Rex Faraday	The Trio	Irineo Maramba	Tom Minton	October 15, 2002	TBA
With Lola's hair getting in her eyes, Melissa attends to it with hair gel, only for Lola to get laughed at. Granny arranges for a hairdressing appointment, but Lola has second thoughts about it, until Granny coaxes her. Song: Does Your Tongue Hang Low? (again) Everyone cleans up after themselves before naptime, except for Daffy. Daffy's biggest mess puts his and the others' visit to the park at stake.
23	10	"Daffy Did It!"	Richard Gasparian	The Trio	Neal Sternecky	Tom Minton	October 16, 2002	TBA
23	10	"The Pig Who Cried Woof"	Nelson Recinos	The Trio	Art Mawhinney	Tom Minton	October 16, 2002	TBA
Tweety puts the blame on Daffy for every single incident caused by his antics. However Daffy's situation is more than it would seem. Song: Foghorn's Talkin’ in the Barnyard (again) With no one but imaginary friends attending her tea parties, Petunia attracts the others' attention with false alarms. Petunia regrets this after the sink starts overflowing.
24	11	"New Cat in Town"	Patrick Gleeson	Karl Geurs	Karl Toerge	Karl Geurs	October 17, 2002	TBA
24	11	"The Magic of Spring"	Kunio Shimamura	Michael Maler & Obie Scott Wade	Mike Milo	Tom Minton	October 17, 2002	TBA
Sylvester gets envious when his attention for being cute is replaced by Baby Pepé, but Sylvester comes to like him after Pepe shows affection for him. Song: Baby Bunny (again) After Bugs' attempt to do magic tricks fails, Bugs wanders into the countryside to view and experience the beauty of springtime, inspiring him to try again with his magic show.
25	12	"Who Said That?"	Becky Bristow	Julie McNally Cahill & Timothy Cahill	Keith Tucker	Julie McNally Cahill & Timothy Cahill	October 18, 2002	TBA
25	12	"Let Them Make Cake"	Jill Jacobs	David Slack	Declan Moran	Karl Geurs	October 18, 2002	TBA
Daffy learns a new word from a garbage man, and later uses it when he gets angry. Daffy teaches it to his friends, and they use it on Granny. Surprised, Granny confronts Daffy and shows him effective ways to control his anger without using profanities. Song: Paws and Feathers (again) Everybody wants to help Granny make a cake except Melissa who just wants to just eat it. Although Melissa misses out on the cake, she joins the others to make another one.
26	13	"For Whom the Toll Calls"	Chris Clayson	Earl Kress	Curt Walstead	Julie McNally Cahill & Timothy Cahill	October 28, 2002	TBA
26	13	"Cereal Boxing"	Larry Leichliter	Roger Eschbacher	Bob Richardson	Julie McNally Cahill & Timothy Cahill	October 28, 2002	TBA
Feeling left out, Petunia and Tweety decide to call Granny's sister, Auntie, but instead, they call a long distance number to Japan, so Granny gives them walkie talkies to play with. Song: John Jacob Jingle Elmer Fudd (again) The babies become obsessed with eating boxes of cereal and gaining prizes when Sylvester receives his. They continue to eat cereal until they get stomach aches. Lacking in cereal, the babies eat oatmeal porridge the following morning.

=== Season 3 (2002) ===
No. overall	No. in season	Title	Animation timing directed by	Written by	Storyboard by	Story editor(s)	Original release date	Prod. code
27	1	"Mind Your Manners"	Aaron Crippen	Michael Maler & Obie Scott Wade	Wendell Washer	Tom Minton	October 29, 2002	TBA
27	1	"Petunia the Piggy Bank"	Randy Ludensky	David Slack	Lenord Robinson	Karl Geurs	October 29, 2002	TBA
The babies practice some table manners to go to a restaurant with Granny. Instead, they make a mess. After cleaning up, Granny gives them lessons in preparation for the trip. Song: Down By the Cage (again) The babies earn some money from Granny to purchase ice cream, except for Petunia, who is saving up. The ice cream man soon introduces a sundae only Petunia can afford and she shares it with everyone.
28	2	"A Pastime for Petunia"	Barbara Dourmashkin-Case	Christopher Simmons	Jeff Allen	Julie McNally Cahill & Timothy Cahill	November 18, 2002	TBA
28	2	"Pouting Match"	Mike Lyman	The Trio	Curtis Cim	Tom Minton	November 18, 2002	TBA
Melissa tries to find something for Petunia that she's good at. Although her attempts to play well fail, the others discover Petunia is good at helpful assistance. Song: Looney Tunes Zoo (again) Lola gets in the habit of pouting when she doesn't get her own way. Fed up with her brattiness, the others mimic her pouty expressions, but begin to use them against each other, until Granny tells Lola about taking turns.
29	3	"Wise Quacker"	Holly du Rivage	The Trio	Jeff Baik	Tom Minton	November 19, 2002	TBA
29	3	"Yours, Mine...and Mine Mine Mine!"	Graham Morris	Tom Sheppard	Vic Dal Chele	Julie McNally Cahill & Timothy Cahill	November 19, 2002	TBA
After watching a Ron Pickles TV special, Melissa begins cracking jokes at her friends, annoying them and eventually upsetting Lola. After a talk with Granny, she makes it up to her friends with comical speech. Song: D-A-F-F-Y (again) Daffy believes Bugs gets some new toys in exchange for giving his old ones away, not realizing what is in store for sharing his stuff.
30	4	"Loose Change"	Rex Faraday	Earl Kress	Lisa Baytos	Julie McNally-Cahill & Timothy Cahill	November 20, 2002	TBA
30	4	"Act Your Age"	Hilary Phillips	Marlowe Weisman	Holly Forsyth	Julie McNally-Cahill & Timothy Cahill	November 20, 2002	TBA
Sylvester becomes afraid of new changes as the babies and Granny try to widen variety, and has no wish to join in the fun, until Granny shows Sylvester what he’s missing. Song: Oh Where, Oh Where Has My Baby Martian Gone? (again) Bugs, Daffy and Sylvester all try to hog attention for Granny. To sort this out, Granny treats the three like they're younger than the others, prompting them to change.
31	5	"Who's Your Granny?"	Richard Gasparian	Marlowe Weisman	Mike Borkowski	Julie McNally Cahill & Timothy Cahill	November 21, 2002	TBA
31	5	"The Tattletale"	Nelson Recinos	Andrew Robinson	Sandra Frame	Julie McNally Cahill & Timothy Cahill	November 21, 2002	TBA
While Granny is recovering from a foot bunion, Lola takes charge. The babies soon get tired of Lola's decision making and they tire her out. Song: If You're Looney (again) Thinking it's the right thing, Lola tells on her friends for any misbehavior. In response to her telltale antics, the babies refuse to play with her, but Lola settles the matter with an apology.
32	6	"The Yolk's on You"	Patrick Gleeson	Libby Hinson	Kathleen Carr	Karl Geurs	November 22, 2002	TBA
32	6	"Baby-Gate"	Kunio Shimamura	Roger Eschbacher	Kevin Frank	Julie McNally Cahill & Timothy Cahill	November 22, 2002	TBA
Daffy and Melissa stick together to play impractical jokes on the others. To get even, Lola demonstrates the consequences of an impractical joke to Daffy and Melissa. Song: Baby Elmer Had a Friend (again) Melissa gossips tales of Taz to the others, whilst Bugs has doubts and tries to prove they aren't true. After proving her wrong, Melissa confesses her fibs.
33	7	"Never Say Try"	Becky Bristow	The Trio	Mary Hanley	Tom Minton	December 9, 2002	TBA
33	7	"Pair O' Dice Lost"	Jill Jacobs	Earl Kress	Rafael Rosado	Julie McNally Cahill & Timothy Cahill	December 9, 2002	TBA
After failed attempts of flying a kite, blowing bubblegum bubbles and dancing, Sylvester refuses to try new activities altogether, until the others trick him into trying finger painting. Song: Taz's Fridge (again) Daffy spoils everyone else's fun, since he can't keep up with them, and Bugs points out Daffy cannot even finish a single task. So Granny rewards him in return for trying to finish, even when things can't always go the way he wants them.
34	8	"Melissa the Hero"	Chris Clayson	Christopher Simmons	Llyn Hunter	Julie McNally Cahill & Timothy Cahill	December 16, 2002	TBA
34	8	"The Trouble with Larry"	Larry Leichliter	David Slack	David Smith	Karl Geurs	December 16, 2002	TBA
After helping Petunia's doll, Melissa brags on about being heroic by making up parts of what actually happened, annoying Petunia. However, Melissa lies when she has re-tell the story to everyone. Song: My Bunny Lies Over the Ocean (again) Because Petunia feels too shy to decline a game with her friends, she invents an imaginary friend, called Larry, which makes the others nervous. They invent their own imaginary friends to snap Petunia out of it.
35	9	"The Littlest Tweety"	Aaron Crippen	Libby Hinson	Norma Klingler	Karl Geurs	December 23, 2002	TBA
35	9	"In Bugs We Trust"	Randy Ludensky	David Slack	Alex Soto	Karl Geurs	December 23, 2002	TBA
Tweety feels distressed from being pushed around and overlooked because of his small size, but everyone else starts to regret it after they can't manage without him. Song: Over the Burrow (again) Everyone goes along with Bugs' decisions until he is entrusted to buy a new net for everyone, when his greed gets the better of him and disappoints them with toys he wanted for himself. Bugs makes up for this by giving up one of his best toys for the necessary money. Because of all this, his friendship with Lola and the others is reconciled and they all try out their new net.
36	10	"Cool for Cats"	Barbara Dourmashkin-Case	Tom Sheppard	Irineo Maramba	Julie McNally Cahill & Timothy Cahill	December 26, 2002	TBA
36	10	"Time Out!"	Mike Lyman	Marlowe Weisman	Neal Sternecky	Julie McNally Cahill & Timothy Cahill	December 26, 2002	TBA
Sylvester believes he lacks coolness and thinks he can get it by eating Chewy Chops Pickle Pops he saw being advertised in a commercial, but all it does is make his breath stink. Song: Ten Loonies in a Bed (again) Bugs, Daffy and Taz get a time out from Granny when they accidentally break the grandfather clock during a game of hockey.
37	11	"Present Tense"	Rex Faraday	Marlowe Weisman	Art Mawhinney	Julie McNally Cahill & Timothy Cahill	December 30, 2002	TBA
37	11	"The Neat and the Sloppy"	Rex Faraday	Christopher Simmons	Karl Toerge	Julie McNally Cahill & Timothy Cahill	December 30, 2002	TBA
Today is Arbor Day, and everyone wants to give Granny something special, but Lola wants to do it by herself. When the others see the trouble Lola is having, they give her a helping hand. Song: The Hare Hid Under the Fountain (again) Daffy spreads a muddy mess around the house, horrifying the tidy Sylvester. Bugs manages to snap Sylvester out of his mania for cleanliness, leaving Daffy to clean up his own mess.
38	12	"Tell-a-Photo"	Unknown	Julie McNally Cahill & Timothy Cahill	TBA	Julie McNally Cahill & Timothy Cahill	December 31, 2002	TBA
38	12	"Move It!"	Unknown	Julie McNally Cahill & Timothy Cahill	TBA	Julie McNally Cahill & Timothy Cahill	December 31, 2002	TBA
(Clip show episode) Granny shows to the babies a photo album and they reminisce about their past times together. Song: Born to Sing (again) (Clip show episode) The babies overhear what they assume is that Granny is moving to a new house and they reminisce the fun times they enjoyed in the house. It is revealed that all Granny wants to do is move around and not move to a new house.

=== Season 4 (2005) ===
No. overall	No. in season	Title	Written by	Original release date	Prod. code
41	1	"These Little Piggies Went to Market"	Carter Crocker	April 4, 2005	TBA
41	1	"Now Museum, Now You Don't"	Earl Kress	April 4, 2005	TBA
The babies help Floyd with the shopping at the supermarket. They go crazy over their favorite foods and mess up the shop, except for Tweety. Floyd takes the babies to an art gallery. Everyone sees that Daffy is fascinated by the artworks a lot more than Floyd expected and Daffy picks up his own interest. Note: This is the first appearance of Floyd Minton.
42	2	"Take Us Out to the Ballgame"	Tim Cahill & Julie McNally Cahill	April 5, 2005	TBA
42	2	"Clues Encounters of the Tweety Kind"	Libby Hinson	April 5, 2005	TBA
Floyd takes the babies to a stadium to watch a baseball game, supporting the Roosters Team. The tables turn for the Roosters when Wingouski does a home run. Floyd takes the babies to a museum for a scavenger hunt, with Sylvester's team competing against Daffy's team and Tweety as a neutral friend wins the hunt.
43	3	"A Bully for Bugs"	Earl Kress	April 6, 2005	TBA
43	3	"The Wheel Deal"	Jim Lewis	April 6, 2005	TBA
Bugs is taken advantage of by Elmer Fudd and is too afraid to tell. The babies resort to befriending him instead of payback. The babies go out bike riding while Tweety rides with Floyd, not amused from the lack of fun, until the others customise a bike for him.
44	4	"Oh, Brother, Warehouse Art Thou?"	Marlowe Weisman	April 7, 2005	TBA
44	4	"Flu the Coop"	Earn Erlich	April 7, 2005	TBA
After Daffy accidentally breaks Granny's chair, Floyd takes everyone to buy a new one, while Sylvester protests the idea of replacing it until the others show him how to stick with what's coming. Granny takes the babies to the hospital for their flu shots, but Bugs and Daffy manage to elude their turn for a shot. In getting ill, Bugs and Daffy miss out on all the fun the others have. Absent: Floyd Minton.
45	5	"Blast Off Bugs"	Carter Crocker	April 8, 2005	TBA
45	5	"Baby Brouhaha"	Sindy McKay	April 8, 2005	TBA
Floyd takes the babies to the museum, whilst Bugs' dream of flying to the moon is shattered, until Taz gets them all tangled in the space experience zone. Bugs thinks Granny is having a baby and the others are convinced by Daffy's make-believe theory on where babies come from and a guidebook on baby care. As everyone prepares by practicing on Tweety, the baby turns out to be a hamster. Absent: Floyd Minton.
46	6	"Log Cabin Fever"	Meredith Jennings-Offen	April 11, 2005	TBA
46	6	"A Mid-Autumn Night's Scream"	Tim Cahill & Julie McNally Cahill	April 11, 2005	TBA
With the babies squabbling over gadgets, Granny decides to take them to a 17th-century farm, where everything is done manually. However Bugs and Daffy are sneakily playing a game pod until they break it. The babies dress up for Halloween, while Lola, Melissa, and Petunia end up with ridiculous costumes. Three Martian Birds accompany them on their trick-or-treating, while Sylvester braves Hilltop Manor. The three girls win the costume contest for originality.
47	7	"Are We There Yet"	Tom Minton	April 12, 2005	TBA
47	7	"Save Our Cinnamon"	Earl Kress	April 12, 2005	TBA
Floyd takes the babies on a long journey to the Acme Garlic Festival. During the journey, they try to pass the time, giving Floyd a tiresome time. Floyd's car breaks down, and while they miss the festival, they get some garlic souvenirs. Floyd take the babies to Auntie's Bakery, where they love cinnamon rolls, but unfortunately, the bakery is due to close down. Everyone works hard to get the bakery in the book of world records so that it can stay in business.
48	8	"Lights! Camera! Tweety!"	Carter Crocker	April 13, 2005	TBA
48	8	"Backstage Bugs"	Sindy McKay	April 13, 2005	TBA
Floyd takes the babies to a TV Studio, guided the star Tessa. When Tessa gets locked outside the building, the babies decide to put on the show for her. As they get tangled on stage, Tweety takes over. Note: Bugs' expression while talking to the viewers was a reference to the 1948 cartoon, Haredevil Hare. Floyd takes the babies to see the Wormies Band concert. Whilst everyone is stalling Floyd, Bugs sneaks up to the backstage, getting scared, but Bugs rejoins the others and meets the star, Willy Worm himself.
49	9	"Bend It Like Petunia"	Libby Hinson	April 14, 2005	TBA
49	9	"Cock-a-Doodle-Doo-It!"	Jim Lewis	April 14, 2005	TBA
Floyd introduces the babies to a game of soccer. While Daffy is under the impression that girls can't play it, Petunia and Taz show better sportsmanship than the others. Petunia manages to score the game to a draw. Song: He'll Be Zooming 'Round the Mountain (She'll Be Coming 'Round the Mountain) Floyd takes the babies to a farm. Tweety is met by a depressed Foghorn who is mocked by all the other roosters for his difference. The babies help him to gain spirit and courage, and Foghorn befriends both Barnyard Dawg and the other roosters.
50	10	"Wrong!"	Marlowe Weisman	April 15, 2005	TBA
50	10	"Win, Lose or Daffy"	Carter Crocker	April 15, 2005	TBA
The babies go with Floyd to an orchard to pick apples. Melissa lectures the others on correctly picking the apples, which annoys them, although she can't understand their reaction. Everyone shows their methods are not wrong, but different. Floyd takes the babies to a mini-golf course. Finding himself without a chance of winning, Daffy cheats, whilst Tweety scores a hole in one every time. Daffy realises the game lies more in the fun than the winning score.
51	11	"A Turtle Named Myrtle"	Carter Crocker	April 18, 2005	TBA
51	11	"There's Nothing Like a Good Book"	Michael Maler & Obie Scott Wade	April 18, 2005	TBA
On a day at the beach, Melissa gets frustrated that she can't have a new spade and makes friends with a baby turtle she calls Myrtle. Melissa wants to keep her, but learns she can't take her from her natural habitat. Song: Oh My Daring, Coyote (Oh My Darling, Clementine) Bugs, Daffy and Lola argue what material the moon is made of. Floyd takes them and Taz to the library for research. They find it hard to refrain from making noise, but manage to find the information they were looking for.
52	12	"The Dolly Vanishes"	Erin Erlich	April 19, 2005	TBA
52	12	"Duck's Reflucks"	Marlowe Weisman	April 19, 2005	TBA
Granny takes the babies on a train to travel to Floyd's college. When Lola loses her doll, Edna, she interrogates the others for their stories. Floyd reveals Edna was stuck in the train window. Floyd takes the babies to a green screen to have their pictures taken. Daffy, disappointed at the choice of scene, spoils Bugs' appearances on the green screen, until the photographer gets his priorities right. Song: Viva La Pew Le Skunk (Viva La Compagnie)
53	13	"Stop and Smell Up the Flowers"	Meredith Jennings-Offen	April 20, 2005	TBA
53	13	"Firehouse Frolics"	Michael Maler & Obie Scott Wade	April 20, 2005	TBA
Pepé tours the babies around the Acme gardens, finding a place to plant a lemon tree. Eventually, everyone gets irritated by Pepé's skunk smell, upsetting him, but they rejoin him, and Pepe introduces them to his friend Gossamer. In the series finale, Floyd takes the babies to a fire station, where Captain Frank tutors them on fire safety procedures, but Daffy won't follow the rules. However, Daffy's morale in the situation of a fire is higher than all the others.

=== Film (2003) ===
No.	Title	Directed by	Written by	Original release date	Prod. code
39	"Baby Looney Tunes' Eggs-traordinary Adventure"	Glorla Yuh Jenkins	Karl Geurs	February 11, 2003	TBA
40	"Baby Looney Tunes' Eggs-traordinary Adventure"	Glorla Yuh Jenkins	Karl Geurs	February 11, 2003	TBA
Taz gets upset when Granny says that Easter isn't until one more day, and when Daffy says there is no such thing as the Easter Bunny. So the other babies try to convince Taz that Daffy is lying by taking him to the forest, where they will hopefully get him to believe. Two half-hour episodes. Songs (TV broadcast only): With Part 1: Mary Had a Baby Duck / With Part 2: The Looney Riddle
