= List of The High Fructose Adventures of Annoying Orange episodes =

The High Fructose Adventures of Annoying Orange is an American comedy television series based on the popular American YouTube show Annoying Orange. The TV show is created by Dane Boedigheimer and Tom Sheppard and produced by The Collective for Cartoon Network. The show previewed on May 28, 2012, and began airing regularly on June 11, 2012. Episodes are normally 11 minutes.

== Series overview ==
Season	Episodes	Originally released	
Season	Episodes	First released	Last released
1	30	May 28, 2012	March 28, 2013
2	30	May 16, 2013	March 17, 2014

== Episodes ==
=== Season 1 (2012–13) ===
This season premiered its twelfth episode on May 28, 2012, as a sneak peek. The series premiered on June 11, 2012, and originally had 6 episodes ordered, then it was later changed to 15 before being changed to a final total of 30 episodes.

No. overall	No. in season	Title	Directed by	Written by	Storyboarded by	Original release date	U.S. viewers (millions)
1	1	"Marshmalia"	Ken Mitchroney	Tom Sheppard	Ken Mitchroney	May 28, 2012	1.78
The fruit gang get stuck on Marshmallow's home planet, and attempt to fight a giant rock candy monster that is jealous of the marshmallows because formerly, the main ingredient in s'mores was rock candy before it got replaced with marshmallows. Note 1: Filming for this episode began in February 2011, and was completed in about 6-7 months. Note 2: This episode is a parody of Star Trek, with Orange as Captain Kirk and Pear as Spock. Special Guests: DaneBoe as campfire Dude #1, Michael Clarke Duncan as Marshmallow King, Felicia Day as the marshmallows, John DiMaggio as Big Rock Candy Monster, Tom Kenny as Coconut, Rob Paulsen as Broccoli Alien Overlord, Tom Sheppard as campfire dude #2 & Unicorn DJ Princess Buttercup
2	2	"Captain Blood Orange"	Ken Mitchroney	Jessica Gao	Mike Camarillo and Ken Mitchroney	June 11, 2012	2.63
The fruit gang become pirates. After they get shot down by snooty vegetables, they find hospitality from a group of corn, only to learn they intend to sacrifice the fruits to a being named "He Who Comes During Night-shift". Special Guests: Tim Curry as Endive & Argula, Tom Kenny as Malacorn, Phil LaMarr as Corny, & Alan Shearman as Heirloom Tomato
3	3	"Sir Juice-a-Lot"	Dane Boedigheimer	Tom Sheppard	Miles Thompson and Rich Wilkie	June 18, 2012	2.28
Orange must save Passion Fruit from an evil knight.
4	4	"Veggie Zombies"	Ken Mitchroney	Tom Sheppard	Mike Kazaleh	June 25, 2012	2.17
An army of zombified vegetables mutated by a broccoli alien invader terrorizes the fruit gang.
5	5	"Founding Fruits"	Dane Boedigheimer	Tom Sheppard	Miles Thompson and Rich Wilkie	July 16, 2012	2.19
A 4th of July special. Grandpa Lemon teaches the other fruits about Fruitdependence Day and fruit history.
6	6	"Fruit-Vengers!"	David Skelly	Luke Barats	Conrad Vernon	July 23, 2012	2.05
The fruits develop superpowers after swimming in a mysterious strange liquid, and use their powers to stop Grapefruit from terrorising the other fruit and vegetables, who has developed telekinesis.
7	7	"Dr. Strange Plum"	Ken Mitchroney	Luke Barats	Mark Murphy	July 30, 2012	1.95
Professor Plum invites the fruit gang to dinner at his mansion, but when they get there, it turns into a murder investigation, the others must investigate who’s killing everyone off.
8	8	"Bad News Pears"	Ken Mitchroney	Luke Barats	Mark Murphy	August 6, 2012	2.09
Orange must man up to beat Grapefruit in a bowling contest.
9	9	"Fruit Plane!"	David Skelly	Tom Sheppard	Nora Johnson and Jon Dillon	August 20, 2012	1.75
When a special guest (played by Gabriel Iglesias) is scheduled to visit the store to show off his new blender, the fruit gang fly to Donkey Island to avoid getting blended, but things go off the rails when Grandpa Lemon falls asleep and gets lemon juice drool on autopilot.
10	10	"The Lords of Fruitbush"	Ken Mitchroney	Tom Sheppard	Mike Kazaleh	August 27, 2012	1.82
A street gang bully Orange and Pear, so they form a neighborhood watch named the Lords of Fruitbush as revenge.
11	11	"Boys vs. Girls"	David Skelly	Luke Barats	Mike Kazaleh	September 3, 2012	1.29
The fruit guys and girls battle each other in a juvenile prank war.
12	12	"Fruitastic Voyorange"	David Skelly	Tom Sheppard	Nora Johnson and Mike Camarillo	September 17, 2012	1.44
Broccoli aliens place a laser inside Nerville’s brain which can destroy anything at any time, and Orange and the crew are shrunk down to remove it.
13	13	"Escape from the Planet of the Grapes of Wrath!"	Ken Mitchroney	Julie McNally-Cahill and Tim Cahill	Mike Kazaleh	October 1, 2012	1.83
Nerville goes on a Grape Valley Vacation. Meanwhile, Orange and the gang save a group of Grapes.
14	14	"Follow the Bouncing Orange"	David Skelly	Mitch Larson	Nora Johnson and Jon Dillon	October 8, 2012	1.26
Pear tricks Orange into going on a fake adventure.
15	15	"Spaghetti West"	Ken Mitchroney	Spencer Grove	Scott Shaw	October 15, 2012	1.49
Nerville and the fruit gang get lost in the desert. Meanwhile, the fruit gang battle against El Dente.
16	16	"Welcome to My Fruitmare"	David Skelly	Tom Sheppard	Mike Camarillo	October 22, 2012	1.64
Teddy Juicer possesses the fruits while they sleep.
17	17	"Annoying Cutesie"	Ken Mitchroney	Julie McNally-Cahill and Tim Cahill	Phred Tinampay	October 29, 2012	1.42
Orange teaches a fruit that claims to be his baby brother to be annoying. Due to the disapproval of Grapefruit, Peach, Pear, Apple and the other fruits, they send a distraught Orange packing. While Orange is gone, the other fruits realize that Orange's "baby brother" is not what he seems.
18	18	"The Day the Store Stood Still"	Ken Mitchroney	Duncan Trussell	Conrad Vernon	November 19, 2012	1.63
A heatwave never cools down throughout the day because an Earth Hamster has stopped spinning in its wheel, so Orange and the rest of the team have to travel to the other side of the earth to find and persuade the hamster to start spinning again.
19	19	"The Annoying Orange Generic Holiday Special"	Tom Sheppard	Tom Sheppard	Floyd Norman	November 26, 2012	1.18
The fruits celebrate the holidays with special guest stars Maria Menounos, Bret Michaels, Alice Cooper, and "Weird Al" Yankovic.
20	20	"Orange Carol"	Ken Mitchroney	Luke Barats	Mike Kazaleh	December 3, 2012	1.41
Orange discovers that his past actions have ruined Christmas.
21	21	"Orange the Red!"	David Skelly	Julie McNally-Cahill and Tim Cahill	Mike Kazaleh	January 24, 2013	1.45
Orange and the fruits discover Greenland.
22	22	"Orange Belt"	David Skelly	Neil Swaab	Mike Kazaleh	January 31, 2013	1.75
Orange and Grapefruit fight for Passion Fruit’s love and affection by going head to head in a Carrot-e battle.
23	23	"When Fruit Ruled the Earth"	Ken Mitchroney	Tom Sheppard	Scott Shaw	February 7, 2013	1.45
Nerville falls in love with prehistoric times.
24	24	"Pop Star"	David Skelly	Luke Barats	Scott Shaw	February 14, 2013	1.35
A Corn Cob makes the gang famous after hearing their great music, but the problem is, every time Popcorn bag does a show, he pops some of the popcorn inside of him. Corn cob says he must go on despite his protests not to.
25	25	"The Fast and the Fruitious"	Ken Mitchroney	Dani Michaeli	Mike Kazaleh	February 21, 2013	1.66
Orange faces off with the Bries in a race around the supermarket.
26	26	"Trans.Fruit.Bots"	David Skelly	Allen Jay Zipper	Conrad Vernon	February 28, 2013	1.45
Nerville creates a robot vacuum and shortly after, the vacuum robot turns evil and sucks everyone into its system. Orange and everyone else must make a plan to destroy it.
27	27	"Chief Executive Orange"	Ken Mitchroney	Tom Sheppard	Floyd Norman	March 7, 2013	1.49
Orange must enter a business to save Nerville from a gang of thugs.
28	28	"Meet the Oranges"	Ken Mitchroney	Jonah Platt and Tom Sheppard	Floyd Norman	March 14, 2013	1.25
Orange's mom and dad visit.
29	29	"Fruitloose"	David Skelly	Spencer Grove	Mike Kazaleh	March 21, 2013	1.53
Dancing gets banned in the produce isle.
30	30	"My Name is Orange"	Ken Mitchroney	Jessica Gao	Scott Shaw	March 28, 2013	1.55
Orange has only 24 hours to live.

=== Season 2 (2013–14) ===
No. overall	No. in season	Title	Directed by	Written by	Storyboarded by	Original release date	U.S. viewers (millions)
31	1	"Little Foodie Cutie"	Tom Sheppard	Jessica Gao	Floyd Norman	May 16, 2013	1.48
Midget Apple wants to win a beauty pageant.
32	2	"Isle of Dr. Fruitenstein"	Tom Sheppard	Julie McNally-Cahill and Tim Cahill	Chris Otsuki	May 23, 2013	1.48
Apple and Orange go to an evil island.
33	3	"Orange's Run"	Tom Sheppard	Tom Sheppard	Mike Kazaleh	May 30, 2013	1.22
Orange is declared a fugitive in the future. Note: This episode is a parody of the film Logan's Run.
34	4	"Marshmallow Wedding"	Tom Sheppard	Tom Sheppard	John Martinez	June 6, 2013	1.47
Marshmallow gets married.
35	5	"Orange... James Orange"	Tom Sheppard	Luke Barats	Scott Shaw	June 13, 2013	1.08
Orange and Passion Fruit turn into spies.
36	6	"Avocadotar"	Tom Sheppard	Matthew Beans	Mike Kazaleh	June 19, 2013	1.08
Nerville turns into a fruit to feel like one of the guys. Meanwhile, Alien Broccoli Overlord tries to use Nerville's body.
37	7	"Food Carnival"	Tom Sheppard	Luke Barats	Floyd Norman	June 26, 2013	1.22
Orange and Passion spend a day at the carnival.
38	8	"Fruitdependence Day"	Tom Sheppard	Luke Barats	Julian Chaney	July 3, 2013	1.32
The gang must save a giant bowl of spaghetti from Alien Broccoli Overlord.
39	9	"Everybody Loves Cabbage!"	Tom Sheppard	Derek Dressler	Mike Kazaleh	July 17, 2013	1.08
After getting his wisdom teeth removed, Orange cannot speak. Meanwhile, a new cabbage begins burying vegetables.
40	10	"King Coco"	Tom Sheppard	Mike Fasolo	Scott Shaw	July 24, 2013	1.11
Orange mocks Coconut for his lack of seeds. Then a meteor hits the store, going into Coconut's mouth, making him King Coco.
41	11	"The Further Adventures of Sherleek Holmes"	Tom Sheppard	Jack Thomas	Scott Shaw	July 31, 2013	1.29
Orange and Pear visit an evil detective.
42	12	"Fruiturama"	Tom Sheppard	Jack Thomas	Chris Otsuki	August 7, 2013	1.24
Orange is frozen in time.
43	13	"Cereal Killer"	Tom Sheppard	Luke Barats	Gregory Sesma	September 11, 2013	1.02
Orange and Pear investigate a murder.
44	14	"Orange Julius Caesar"	Tom Sheppard	Peter Merryman	Chris Otsuki	September 18, 2013	1.10
Orange becomes a god in the past.
45	15	"Armagourdon"	Tom Sheppard	Matthew Beans	Mike Kazaleh	September 25, 2013	1.08
The fruits go to space. Note: This episode is a parody of the film Armageddon.
46	16	"Orange Say Knock You Out!"	Tom Sheppard	Matthew Beans	John Martinez	October 2, 2013	1.07
Orange becomes a rap star.
47	17	"Hungry Fruit Games"	Tom Sheppard	Jessica Gao	John Martinez	October 9, 2013	1.22
Orange and Passion are pitted against each other in a game to the death.
48	18	"Peartergeist"	Tom Sheppard	Julie McNally-Cahill and Tim Cahill	Chris Otsuki	October 16, 2013	0.84
Pear gets possessed by a ghost.
49	19	"Bat's All, Fruits"	Tom Sheppard	Derek Dressler	Floyd Norman	October 23, 2013	1.33
An evil bat terrorizes the fruits.
50	20	"Little Cart of Scaries"	Tom Sheppard	Rachel Bloom	Scott Shaw	October 30, 2013	0.83
Nerville gets a new plant to get back at the fruits.
51	21	"Thanksfornothing Day"	Tom Sheppard	Luke Barats	Floyd Norman	November 26, 2013	1.09
A look at why the fruits hate Thanksgiving.
52	22	"Fruitsy the Snowfruit"	Tom Sheppard	Matthew Beans	Mike Kazaleh	December 4, 2013	1.28
Orange is jealous of a snowman.
53	23	"Shakesparagus Speare"	Tom Sheppard	Peter Merryman	Floyd Norman	January 20, 2014	0.86
The fruits go to England. Note: This was the final episode to be produced.
54	24	"FruitBalls"	Tom Sheppard	Luke Barats	Floyd Norman	January 27, 2014	0.85
The fruits go to camp. Note: This episode was originally going to be aired on March 17, 2014, until Cartoon Network decided to push back the 1/2 hour special back to that date.
55	25	"Clementine's Day"	Tom Sheppard	Matthew Beans	Chris Otsuki	February 10, 2014	0.81
Ginger tries to woo Pear with magical arrows.
56	26	"Mash of the Titans"	Tom Sheppard	Luke Barats	Chris Otsuki	February 24, 2014	1.11
The fruit gang go to medieval times.
57	27	"Lost Food Pyramid"	Tom Sheppard	Jack Thomas	Chris Otsuki	March 3, 2014	0.76
Orange, Pear, and Midget Apple search for the lost food pyramid.
58	28	"Meet Banana Monocle"	Tom Sheppard	Tom Sheppard	Floyd Norman	March 10, 2014	0.90
A rockumentary of when the fruits were in a rockband.: Special guest star: Dave Grohl
59	29	"Defending Your Fruit Cart"	Tom Sheppard	Tom Sheppard and Mike Fasolo	Scott Shaw	March 17, 2014	1.14
60	30	"Defending Your Fruit Cart"	Tom Sheppard	Tom Sheppard and Mike Fasolo	Scott Shaw	March 17, 2014	1.14
Part 1: Broccoli Alien Overlord demands that the fruits surrender. Part 2: The fruit gang decide to face all of their enemies yet, with the power of annoyingness. Note: This episode was supposed to be aired on January 27, 2014. However, it was pushed back nearly two months due to Cartoon Network and Daneboe deciding to air this as the series finale.
