= Cloudboy (disambiguation) =

Cloudboy or Cloud Boy may refer to:

- the Stearman Cloudboy, an aircraft of the 1930s
- Cloudboy, an electronic music group active from 1995 to 2003
- Cloud Boy, a children's book published in 2006
