= Histeria! =

American animated series

- Title card
- Created by: Tom Ruegger
- Voices of: Frank Welker; Tress MacNeille; Jeff Bennett; Laraine Newman; Luke Ruegger; Cody Ruegger; Nathan Ruegger; Maurice LaMarche; Billy West; Cree Summer; Paul Rugg; Rob Paulsen; Nora Dunn
- Theme music composer: Richard Stone; John Philip Sousa
- Composers: Richard Stone; Steve Bernstein; Julie Bernstein; Tim Kelly; Gordon Goodwin
- Country of origin: United States
- Original language: English
- No. of seasons: 2
- No. of episodes: 52

Production
- Executive producer: Tom Ruegger
- Producer: Bob Doucette
- Running time: 22 minutes
- Production company: Warner Bros. Television Animation

Original release
- Network: Kids' WB
- Release: September 14, 1998 – March 31, 2000

Histeria! is an American animated series created by Tom Ruegger and produced by Warner Bros. Television Animation.

Unlike other animated series produced by Warner Bros. in the 1990s, the series was an explicitly educational program created to meet FCC requirements for educational/informational content for children.

Histeria! aired on Kids' WB from September 14, 1998, to March 31, 2000, and continued to air reruns until August 30, 2001. The show was presented as a Saturday Night Live-style sketch comedy, with its cast often filling the roles of historical figures. It was to be WB's most ambitious project since Animaniacs. Like the aforementioned series, 65 episodes were originally going to be made, but due to being $10 million over budget, only 52 episodes were completed before production of the series was canceled in March 2000. Due to the high production costs, footage from previous episodes was often re-used and re-timed to match newly recorded audio, as well as several non-educational segments being used as filler. More recently, the show was aired on In2TV, first from March to July 2006, and then it returned in October of that year. In January 2009, all of the episodes were taken off the site. MeTV Toons included the program as part of its educational/informational slate when it launched on June 25, 2024.

== Summary ==
Like other animated series produced at the time by Warner Bros. Animation, Histeria! derived most of humor from its slapstick comedy and satire, with the distinction of combining historical figures and events. Episodes would commonly feature a large cast of children and typecast adults in comedic skits and song parodies, e.g., the cause of the American Civil War sung to the tune of the theme song from The Brady Bunch.

== Characters ==
=== The hosts ===
- Father Time (voiced by Frank Welker) is the main "host" of the show, allowing the cast to "travel" through time. He is dark-skinned, has a long beard and is shown to get quite irritated by the Kid Chorus when they fail to get their facts right. This tends to irritate Loud Kiddington who often screams "SHEESH, WHAT A GROUCH!" after he is out of sight.
- Big Fat Baby (voiced by Luke Ruegger) is the egg-shaped sidekick to Father Time, frequently accompanying him as he introduces the sketches. He is known for the foul odor he carries, caused by his constant defecation in his diaper, which is constantly stated to have been unchanged since ancient times. Big Fat Baby is also accident prone, often falling down steps or off of high places. There seems to be multiple Big Fat Babies, including some female versions with a single strand of hair and bow.
- Miss Information (voiced by Laraine Newman) is an aptly named ditzy tour guide who leads a group of tourists through various moments in history, as if the world is her own personal museum. As her name suggests, she is constantly getting her facts wrong and sometimes coming up with some demented logic to justify her statement (for example, she believes the Washington Monument is not named after George Washington because it is not called the George Monument).
- The World's Oldest Woman (voiced by Tress MacNeille) is a very old woman who claims to remember when air was invented. She also claims to have dated every historical male in history. She seems to have a particular romantic interest in Bill Straitman. She is known to romantically hound every male host of an episode as well.

=== The Kid Chorus ===
- Loud Kiddington (voiced by Cody Ruegger) is a young boy so named for the extremely loud volume in which he talks. He often performs "dramatic reenactments" of loud moments in history, such as the Big Bang and the creation of dynamite; with each of this, the viewer is told to turn up the TV volume "for maximum effect." Sometimes, he also keeps watch of something by almost silently muttering "I see it, I see it..." when it is in sight and then switching to screaming "DON'T SEE IT! DON'T SEE IT!" when he loses sight of it. He is voiced by Tom Ruegger's son, Cody Ruegger, and the character's personality is based on Cody because he "has the tendency to be the loudest kid on Earth".
- Charity Bazaar (voiced by Laraine Newman) is the female lead of the Histeria! Kid Chorus, and her main personality trait is that she is usually depicted as being very depressed, as shown by her catch phrase, "I'm not happy." She tends to speak in a monotone unless excited or singing, something she appears to genuinely enjoy. She is willing to take a stand for animal rights, can be easily tempted with promises of being given cookies, and hates doing math homework.
- Froggo (voiced by Nathan Ruegger) is a short blonde-haired boy in the Kid Chorus with a low, frog-like voice, hence his name. He often asks historical figures for two seemingly useless items that he can actually make an invention out of, though he does not always receive the requested items. He is also shown to have a large appetite, but dislikes turnips, and in "Americana", it is shown that he is a big fan of Batman.
- Aka Pella (voiced by Cree Summer) is an African American member of the Kid Chorus who uses sassy lingo, often delivering comedically timed insults to whoever she is currently hanging out with. Unlike most of the other girls in the Kid Chorus, she is a tomboy and tends to be able to be a voice of reason to the group.
- Pepper Mills (voiced by Tress MacNeille) is a hyperactive teenage fangirl driven to adoration for any and all celebrities. Virtually everything she says is followed by enthusiastic scream. She constantly gets historical figures to give her autographs, and is then shocked to learn they are not the pop cultural celebrities for whom she has mistaken them. She also occasionally hosts an interview show titled Pepper's Pep Rally. She seems to be incredibly fast and will pop up and scream until the person she is pestering agrees to give an autograph.
- Toast (voiced by Tress MacNeille) is a clueless surfer teenager whose name comes from the idea that his brain is fried like toast. His name is also due to the fact that his skin is perpetually sunburnt. He hosts a talk show titled Ask Me If I Care, in which he invites historical celebrities to tell him what they are famous for, only for him to eventually eject them into the sky (sometimes even into space), because he never does care about what they are telling him. He also once mentions having a rock band, which he names Nasty Head Wound, and also mentions that he has an uncle named Melba.
- Cho-Cho (voiced by Tress MacNeille) is a little Chinese girl who is more devious than she looks. Always accompanied by Lucky Bob, she likes to follow people around, refusing to leave them alone until they buy what she is selling. Her dialogue is almost always accompanied by "Chopsticks" as the background music.
- Lucky Bob (voiced by Jeff Bennett) is a boy with a very noticeable overbite. He tends to speak with a dim-witted drawl. He usually only speaks when agreeing with something another character has said (regardless of whatever they said), using Ed McMahon catchphrases such as "You are correct, sir," "Yes now," and "Hi-yo!"
- Pule Houser (voiced by Frank Welker) is an overweight kid in the show's cast who tends to take abuse and is prone to pitching fits.
- Susanna Susquahanna (voiced by Tress MacNeille) is a little Native American girl with beady eyes and a large gap in her front teeth that gives her a gigantic, Sylvester-like lisp. She usually affirms things by saying "Thath's Twue" (That's true).
- Kip Ling, Chipper the Crooked Mouth Boy, and the Bow-Haired Girl are three additional Kid Chorus members who usually only show up in the songs or in crowd shots. They do not seem to have any distinguishing characteristics or dialogue like the rest of the group.

=== Others ===
- Bill Straitman (voiced by James Wickline) is the straight man to the rest of the characters. He typically winds up interviewing both historical figures and the World's Oldest Woman, the latter of which he struggles to fight off her advances.
- Mr. Smartypants (voiced by Rob Paulsen) is a shy genius who wears exceedingly large pants and spouts various tidbits of knowledge. The only part of his upper body ever seen are the top of his head and his hands. In a piece of irony, he harbors romantic feelings for Miss Information. Mr. Smartypants often explains historical facts of crude nature, such as the invention of the toilet, which exasperates Lydia Karaoke as the network censor.
- Chit Chatterson (voiced by Billy West) is an eccentric commercial salesman, often attempting to swindle his customers.
- Fetch (voiced by Frank Welker) is Loud's aptly named talking dog, who loves chasing tennis balls and frequently asks the historical figures if they want to play catch with him. He always appears with Loud whenever the latter is attempting to sell something, with Loud claiming that he will make Fetch eat something unpleasant should he fail to make a sale, for which Fetch is never prepared.
- Lydia Karaoke (voiced by Nora Dunn) is an employee for Kids' WB who has been assigned as the network censor for the show, and given the show's nature, this can be quite a hassle for her. Often, she interrupts the sketches to complain that what is about to be or has just been shown is inappropriate for children's television (usually violence, foul language, nudity, and anything considered gross or rude). Infrequently, her attempts to moderate the show results in physical harm for her, resulting in her conceding to the original point. Lydia is also the host of "What's My Job?", a game show in which the contestants must guess the job of the historical figure featured, which, to her frustration, they can never come close to doing. In the episode "Histeria Goes to the Moon", it is stated that Lydia used to work for the Weather Channel.
- Sammy Melman (voiced by Rob Paulsen) is a spoof of the smarmy and desperate television executives, constantly belittling and demeaning the Histeria! cast for the sake of ratings.
- Molly Pitcher (voiced by Tress MacNeille) constantly offers refreshments in the form of water with a wide grin, saucer-sized eyes and overly cheery disposition, modelled after Martha Stewart.
- Nostradamus (voiced by Paul Rugg) claims to be able to "predictiate" the future, though he is proven wrong on occasion. He often acts erratically and impatiently, and will constantly yell "Shutup" in the middle of a sentence, usually to quiet any sort of audience.

== Parody of historical figures ==
Most of the recurring real-life historical figures in Histeria! were portrayed as caricatures of real-life celebrities from the modern era. The intent was to make analogies to contemporary individuals in terms of personalities and attitudes. Some of these include:

- Hervé Villechaize as Napoleon Bonaparte (Jeff Bennett)
- Bob Hope as George Washington (Maurice LaMarche)
- Bette Davis as Elizabeth I (Tress MacNeille)
- Jack Benny as Thomas Jefferson (Billy West)
- Woody Allen as Sigmund Freud (Rob Paulsen) and Woodrow Wilson (Maurice LaMarche)
- Frank Sinatra as Julius Caesar (Fred Travalena)
- Regis Philbin as Alexander Graham Bell (Jeff Bennett)
- Jay Leno as Benjamin Franklin (Billy West)
- John Cleese as Isaac Newton (Jeff Bennett)
- Katharine Hepburn as Eleanor Roosevelt (Tress MacNeille)
- Cary Grant as William Shakespeare (Maurice LaMarche)
- Arnold Schwarzenegger as Leif Erikson (Jeff Bennett)
- Ricardo Montalbán as Moctezuma II (Paul Rugg)
- Kirk Douglas as Amerigo Vespucci and Michelangelo (both voiced by Maurice LaMarche)
- George Burns as Thomas Edison and John Adams (both voiced by Billy West)
- Bing Crosby as Socrates (Maurice LaMarche)
- Pee-Wee Herman as William Tecumseh Sherman (Billy West)
- Dean Martin as Marc Antony and William Clark (physically designed after Clark Kent from Superman: The Animated Series) (both voiced by Fred Travalena)
- Jerry Lewis as Meriwether Lewis (Paul Rugg)
- Christopher Walken as Nicola Tesla (Jeff Bennett)
- Charo as Eva Peron (Charo)
- Tasmanian Devil as Attila the Hun (Jim Cummings)
- Fred Rogers as Plato (Jeff Bennett)
- Gregory Peck as Richard E. Byrd (Frank Welker)
- John Wayne as Genghis Khan (Billy West)
- Sylvester Stallone as Kublai Khan (Billy West)
- George Jessel as Confucius (Billy West)
- Johnny Carson as Abraham Lincoln (Maurice LaMarche)
- Father Guido Sarducci as Leonardo da Vinci (Don Novello)
- William Shatner as Martin Luther (Maurice LaMarche)
- Jon Lovitz as Christopher Columbus (Maurice LaMarche)
- Groucho Marx as Karl Marx (Maurice LaMarche)
- Chico Marx as Friedrich Engels (Billy West)
- Abbott and Costello as the Wright brothers (Rob Paulsen and Billy West)

== Episodes ==
=== Series overview ===
Season	Episodes	Originally released	
Season	Episodes	First released	Last released
1	46	September 14, 1998	July 17, 1999
2	6	September 20, 1999	March 31, 2000

=== Season 1 (1998–99) ===
No.	Title	Directed by	Written by	Original release date
1	"Inventors Hall of Fame – Part I"	Herb Moore, Stephen Lewis, Bob Doucette, Scott Jeralds	Brian Palermo, Julie McNally, Tim Cahill, Tom Ruegger, Mark Seidenberg	September 14, 1998
Wraparounds: The Hall of Fame presents Alexander Graham Bell, Thomas Edison, J. Robert Oppenheimer and Thomas Crapper.: Alexander Graham Bell is introduced to the modern telephone system.; With Loud Kiddington's help, Thomas Edison gets an idea of inventing a light bulb.; J. Robert Oppenheimer and Toast discuss the Manhattan Project: an atomic bomb.; Alexander goes crazy about the modern telephone system and seeks Thomas Watson's help.; Mr. Smartypants introduces the inventor of flushing toilets, Thomas Crapper, but gets interrupted by network censor Lydia Karaoke, who thinks that the segment is too gross for children's TV.
2	"The U.S. Civil War – Part I"	Stephen Lewis, Mike Milo, Herb Moore	Tim Cahill, Julie McNally, Roger Eschbacher, Tom Ruegger, Michael Maler, Mark Seidenberg, Erin Erlich, Alex Borstein	September 15, 1998
Abraham Lincoln provides a monologue, and gives a Histeria! version of the Gettysburg Address. The Histeria! gang also listens to The Hits of the 1860s and The Emancipation Proclamation Hoedown.
3	"The Attack of the Vikings"	Herb Moore	Tim Cahill, Julie McNally, Victor Wilson, Tom Ruegger, Mark Seidenberg, Roger Eschbacher	September 16, 1998
The gang sing about being a Viking, play "See It/Don't See It", and Meet the Vikings with Bill Straitman.
4	"The Wild West"	Jon McClenahan, John Griffin, Dave Pryor	Roger Eschbacher	September 17, 1998
The Histeria! gang present The Billy the Kid Show, sing about the gold rush, meet the Earps, and learn about the Pony Express.
5	"The American Revolution – Part I"	Scott Jeralds	Brian Palermo, Roger Eschbacher	September 18, 1998
The gang listen to George Washington give his monologue, visit Molly Pitcher, and attend the Showdown at York.
6	"The Know-It-Alls"	Stephen Lewis, Mike Milo	Paul Rugg, Roger Roger Eschbacher, Brian Palermo, Stephen Moore, Mark Seidenberg	September 21, 1998
The gang meet René Descartes; a talk show discussing the age-old question "Which came first: the chicken or the egg?", and Miss Information appears on a Dating Game-style show with history's greatest inventors, philosophers, and geniuses lined up as potential suitors.
7	"The Renaissance"	Herb Moore	Brian Palermo	September 22, 1998
The gang meet Leonardo da Vinci, see masterpieces of the Renaissance, and explore the book formerly known as The Prince.
8	"The U.S. Civil War – Part II"	Herb Moore, Stephen Lewis	Tim Cahill, Roger Eschbacher, Julie McNally, Brian Palermo, Mark Seidenberg, Jed Spingarn, Victor Wilson	September 23, 1998
The gang dive back into the Civil War and sing about it, Lydia Karaoke learns why "Damn the torpedoes" should not be censored, and a visit to Abe Lincoln's Tall and Geeky Shop.
9	"Really Oldies But Goodies"	Mike Milo, Bob Doucette	Tim Cahill, Julie McNally, Brian Palermo, Mark Seidenberg, Jed Spingarn, Victor Wilson	September 24, 1998
It is a musical trip to Egypt as the gang sing about mummies, slaving on the pyramids, and see the Egyptian musical "Cats".
10	"The American Revolution – Part II"	Scott Jeralds	Brian Palermo, Roger Eschbacher, Tom Ruegger, Victor Wilson, Mark Seidenberg	September 25, 1998
Histeria! takes another look at the American Revolution as the gang listen to George Washington sing a duet with his wife Martha, attend the Boston Tea Party, and see Midnight Line.
11	"A Blast in the Past"	Bob Doucette	Tom Ruegger, Mark Seidenberg, Marc Drotman, Chad Einbinder	September 26, 1998
The gang spew their guts at a Roman vomitorium (despite Lydia Karaoke's best efforts to warn viewers that bingeing and purging is not allowed on TV), listen to the Big Fat Twin Babies sing, and meet Romulus and Remus.
12	"China"	Stephen Lewis	John Ludin	September 28, 1998
The gang take a pop quiz and join the Confucius Group again.
13	"Tribute to Tyrants"	Mike Milo, Herb Moore, Scott Jeralds	Steve Moore, Marc Drotman, Tim Cahill, Julie McNally, Victor Wilson, Mark Seidenberg, Erin Erlich, Alex Borstein	September 30, 1998
The gang meet Attila the Hun and hear more from Miss Information.
14	"The Montezuma Show"	Stephen Lewis	Victor Wilson, Marc Drotman, Tim Cahill, Julie McNally, Tom Ruegger, Mark Seidenberg	October 2, 1998
The gang visit the Sacrificial Well, stop in on The Order of the Eagle, and browse the Inca Shopping Network.
15	"Great Heroes of France"	Scott Jeralds	Randy Rogel, Roger Eschbacher, Tom Ruegger, Victor Wilson, Mark Seidenberg	October 7, 1998
The gang meet Joan of Arc and sing the Invasion song. Napoleon sells the Louisiana Purchase to make up for the money lost by his shopping addict wife, Josephine.
16	"The Terrible Tudors"	Scott Jeralds	Tim Cahill, Marc Drotman, Tom Ruegger, Julie McNally, Mark Seidenberg	October 8, 1998
The gang play Name Thy Cure, and tell the tale of the Tudors.
17	"The Wheel of History"	Stephen Lewis	Steve Moore, Roger Eschbacher, Tom Ruegger, Brian Palermo, Victor Wilson, Mark Seidenberg	October 9, 1998
The gang spin the Wheel of History and visit four places in history.
18	"When Time Collides"	Mike Milo	Melody Fox, Brian Palermo, Tom Ruegger, Mark Seidenberg	October 10, 1998
The gang look at the United Nations and honor more great women in history.
19	"Around the World in a Daze"	John Griffin, Dave Pryor, Mike Milo	Tim Cahill, Julie McNally, Marc Drotman, Brian Palermo, Roger Eschbacher, Tom Ruegger, Mark Seidenberg	October 14, 1998
The gang explore explorers exploring the world, Christopher Columbus and Magellan.
20	"Histeria Satellite TV"	Mike Milo	Steve Moore, Victor Wilson, Brian Palermo, Tom Ruegger, Mark Seidenberg	October 16, 1998
Tune in to Histeria! Satellite TV for looks at various points in history.
21	"General Sherman's Campsite"	Mike Milo, Stephen Lewis	Brian Palermo, Roger Eschbacher, Tom Ruegger, Mark Seidenberg	October 17, 1998
In this parody of the 1980s CBS kids' show Pee-wee's Playhouse, Pee-wee Herman is a gray-suited man-child, General William Tecumseh Sherman, who plans to burn Atlanta and turn the tide of the Civil War in favor of the North with the secret word of the day, "Total War". In the meantime, the Histeria! kids pester Harriet Tubman (voiced by CCH Pounder), thinking her Underground Railroad is an actual train line, and Lydia Karaoke briefly interjects to complain about the line "War is hell".
22	"Return to Rome"	Herb Moore, Bob Doucette	Mark Seidenberg, Randy Rogel, Tom Ruegger	October 23, 1998
The gang take a day and look at how Rome was built and sing about it.
23	"The Russian Revolution"	Bob Doucette, Mike Milo	David Doré, Mark Drotman, Tom Ruegger, Mark Seidenberg	October 24, 1998
The gang take a look at Joseph Stalin and the USSR.
24	"Inventors Hall of Fame – Part II"	Bob Doucette, Mike Milo, Herb Moore	Randy Rogel, Roger Eschbacher, Tom Ruegger, Mark Seidenberg, Stephen Shaw, Victor Wilson	October 30, 1998
The gang once again dig into the Inventors' Hall of Fame to honor Benjamin Franklin, Thomas Jefferson, and others.
25	"Megalomaniacs"	Bob Doucette, Scott Jeralds	Jed Spingarn, Mark Drotman, Alex Borstein, Erin Erlich, Roger Eschbacher, Jeff Zimmer, Mark Seidenberg, Tom Ruegger	October 31, 1998
The gang take a look at some of the big bad guys of history. Note: Two versions of this episode exist: a sketch about Custer's Last Stand — in which the kids mistakenly believe George Armstrong Custer is running a custard stand — replaced a sketch depicting the Spanish Inquisition as a game show called "Convert or Die", hosted by Tomás de Torquemada after a complaint from the Catholic League for Religious and Civil Rights, who claimed the sketch "[taught] children to reject Catholicism". The "Convert or Die" sketch has since been restored when the show aired online on In2TV.
26	"Hooray For Presidents"	Bob Doucette, Stephen Lewis, Mike Milo, Herb Moore	Tim Cahill, Roger Eschbacher, Julie McNally, Tom Ruegger, Mark Seidenberg, Jed Spingarn, Brian Swenlin	November 6, 1998
The gang meet President Lincoln again and explores even more presidents.
27	"The Thomas Jefferson Program"	Mike Milo, Herb Moore	Tom Ruegger, Mark Seidenberg, Tim Cahill, Julie McNally, Roger Eschbacher, Alex Borstein, Erin Ehrlich	November 7, 1998
In this homage to the 1950s and 1960s The Jack Benny Program, Thomas Jefferson leads the fun when the gang learn handwriting from John Hancock (played by Chit Chatterson), and make a flag with Betsy Ross (played by The World's Oldest Woman). John Adams is voiced with an impression of George Burns, who was Jack Benny's close friend, and John Dunlap was voiced with an impression of Eddie "Rochester" Anderson.
28	"More Explorers"	John Griffin, Stephen Lewis, Herb Moore, Dave Pryor	Marc Drotman, Roger Eschbacher, Brian Palermo, Julie McNally, Tim Cahill, Tom Ruegger, Mark Seidenberg, Jed Spingarn, Victor Wilson	November 13, 1998
More from the Confucius Group and learn why one should never explore without the Discoverer Card.
29	"Super Writers"	Scott Jeralds	Tim Cahill, Julie McNally, Roger Eschbacher, Brian Palermo, Jed Spingarn, Mark Seidenberg	November 21, 1998
Ernest Hemingway and Mark Twain join forces to bring writing to the world, in typical Histeria! style.
30	"History Of Flight"	Scott Jeralds	John Ludin, Mark Seidenberg, Tim Cahill, Julie McNally	February 6, 1999
The gang meet the Wright Brothers and park in the No Parking Zone.
31	"Presidential People"	Mike Milo, Stephen Lewis	Tom Ruegger, Mark Seidenberg, Roger Eschbacher, Tim Cahill, Julie McNally, Paul Rugg, Barry Braverman, Jed Spingarn, Marlowe Weisman	February 13, 1999
A heavy musical look into the lives and doings of more presidents.
32	"Writers of the Purple Prose"	John Griffin, Jon McClenahan, Mike Owens, Dave Pryor, Scott Jeralds	Tom Ruegger, Mark Seidenberg, Brian Palermo, Randy Rogel, Jed Spingarn	February 20, 1999
Famous writers Samuel Butler and William Shakespeare and see Mary Had A Little Lamb 2000.
33	"Histeria Around the World I"	Stephen Lewis, Bob Doucette, Herb Moore, Scott Jeralds	Tom Ruegger, Mark Seidenberg, Tim Cahill, Julie McNally, Roger Eschbacher, Randy Rogel, Jeff Zimmer	February 27, 1999
The gang learn the complete and unabridged history of Greenland, Antarctica, and New Zealand and play "Ask Me If I Care".
34	"When America Was Young"	Stephen Lewis, Bob Doucette, Herb Moore, Mike Milo	Tom Ruegger, Brian Palermo, Victor Wilson, Tim Cahill, Julie McNally, Chris Darga	March 6, 1999
Daniel Boone and Benedict Arnold star in their own shows depicting the Revolutionary War and the western frontier.
35	"Loud Kiddington's Ancient History"	Bob Doucette, Scott Jeralds, Stephen Lewis, Jon McClenahan, Mike Milo	Tom Ruegger, Mark Seidenberg, Brian Palermo, Victor Wilson, Jed Spingarn, Alex Borstein, Erin Ehrlich, Michael Maler	March 13, 1999
The gang see the First Wheel, sing about the names of the gods, and see an Olympic Moment.
36	"Super Amazing Constitutions"	Scott Jeralds, Herb Moore	Tom Ruegger, Mark Seidenberg, Roger Eschbacher, Brian Palermo	March 20, 1999
The Constitution gets a Histeria! overhaul and the gang meet Andrew Jackson and fire when they see the whites of their eyes.
37	"Better Living Through Science"	Bob Doucette, Scott Jeralds, Jon McClenahan, Mike Milo, Herb Moore	Mark Seidenberg, Brian Palermo, Tim Cahill, Julie McNally, Victor Wilson, David Doré, Roger Eschbacher, Randy Rogel	March 27, 1999
The gang take the Road of Invention to see that what goes up, must come down and witness great moments in medicine.
38	"The Dawn of Time"	Jon McClenahan, Bob Doucette, John Griffin, David Pryor	Tom Ruegger	April 3, 1999
Histeria! takes a scientific twist and looks at the dawn of time, which only the World's Oldest Women know much about, including dinosaurs.
39	"Music"	Scott Jeralds, Herb Moore, Bob Doucette	Tom Ruegger, Jeff Zimmer, Brian Palermo	April 17, 1999
Histeria! looks at music and wonders "Music to Whose Ears?" with Mozart. Plus, Big Fat Baby and twin sing a jingle.
40	"World War II"	Herb Moore, Vince Price, Stephen Lewis, Bob Doucette, Mike Milo	Tom Ruegger, Mark Seidenberg, Roger Eschbacher, Jed Spingarn	April 24, 1999
Histeria! introduces the Freedom League and learns why there is nothing to fear from Franklin D. Roosevelt.
41	"The Teddy Roosevelt Show"	Bob Doucette, Stephen Lewis, Herb Moore, Mike Milo, John Griffin, Wendie Price, Djordie Cakovan	Roger Eschbacher, Victor Wilson, Jeff Zimmer	May 1, 1999
Histeria! meets Teddy Roosevelt and explores the Canal of Doom.
42	"Communuts!"	Bob Doucette, Mike Milo, Jon McClenahan, Mike Owens, Stephen Lewis, Scott Jeralds	Tim Cahill, Julie McNally, Jeff Zimmer, Stephen Shaw, Mark Seidenberg, Brian Palermo, Tom Ruegger	May 8, 1999
A twisted Histeria! look at communism, including raps from Winston Churchill and Will Rogers.
43	"Americana"	Stephen Lewis, Herb Moore, Bob Doucette, Mike Milo	Jeff Zimmer, Michael Maler, Tim Cahill, Julie McNally, John Ludin	May 15, 1999
A patriotic look at American lifestyles now and how they used to be, and a visit to Berry Ding Live.
44	"20th Century Presidents"	Scott Jeralds, Herb Moore, Bob Doucette, Mike Milo, Stephen Lewis	Jeff Zimmer, Roger Eschbacher, Marc Drotman, Mark Seidenberg, Jed Spingarn, Barry Braverman	May 22, 1999
A Histeria! look at President Richard Nixon and John F. Kennedy, along with the Watergate scandal, then Rally At The Beach with Pepper!
45	"Histeria Around the World II"	Bob Doucette, Stephen Lewis, Mike Milo, Herb Moore	Tom Ruegger, Michael Maler, Brian Palermo, TIm Cahill, Julie McNally, Roger Eschbacher, Mark Seidenberg	June 5, 1999
The show looks at the Great Woman World Leaders Therapy Group and the Pastry War, along with another round of "Ask Me If I Care" with Mohandas Gandhi.
46	"Histeria Goes to the Moon"	Herb Moore, Bob Doucette, Stephen Lewis, Mike Milo	Roger Eschbacher, Mark Seidenberg, Jeff Zimmer	July 17, 1999
The gang sets foot on the Moon with Neil Armstrong and the Apollo 11.

=== Season 2 (1999–2000) ===
No. overall	No. in season	Title	Directed by	Written by	Original release date
47	1	"Return to China"	Mike Milo, Stephen Lewis, Herb Moore, Bob Doucette	Mark Seidenberg, Roger Eschbacher, Tom Ruegger, Brian Palermo, John Ludin	September 20, 1999
More historical sketches regarding China are shown, such as the construction of the Great Wall of China and the Cultural Revolution. Plus, Yin and Yang are presented as superheroes.
48	2	"The French Revolution"	Scott Jeralds, Herb Moore, Bob Doucette, Stephen Lewis	Tom Ruegger, Brian Palermo, Tim Cahill, Julie McNally, Victor Wilson	September 24, 1999
The gang meet Nostradamus and a man named Louie. Napoleon also appears as the butt of many size jokes. The Tennis Court Oath is also explored.
49	3	"North America"	Herb Moore, Mike Milo, Scott Jeralds, Bob Doucette	Roger Eschbacher, Jeff Zimmer, Michael Maler	October 1, 1999
It is a wild look at North America. Stops include Canada, Klondike Acres and Mayberry - that is to say, the Histeria! version of Mayberry.
50	4	"Heroes of Truth & Justice"	Bob Doucette, Herb Moore, Mike Milo	Mark Seidenberg, Jeff Zimmer, Marc Drotman, Sean Hogan	January 17, 2000
Histeria! takes a march with Dr. Martin Luther King Jr. and boycotts buses, and attends the trial of the century with Socrates.
51	5	"Euro-Mania!"	Herb Moore, Jon McClenahan, Stephen Lewis, Bob Doucette, Scott Jeralds, Mike Milo	Mark Seidenberg, Brian Palermo, Michael Maler, Marlowe Weisman, Marc Drotman, Chris Darga	March 24, 2000
It is off to Europe to witness the Renaissance and a scrapple at the chapel, with another round of "Ask Me If I Care" with Charlemagne.
52	6	"Big Fat Baby Theatre"	Stephen Lewis, Mike Milo, Dave Bodensteiner, Dave Pryor, Scott Jeralds, Herb Moore, Bob Doucette, Lenord Robinson	Jeff Zimmer, Mark Seidenberg, Brian Palermo, Marlow Weisman, Stephen Shaw	March 31, 2000
The episode takes a look at random moments in history through the eyes of Big Fat Baby. Note: This episode ends with the cast and crew of Histeria singing "Auld Lang Syne" a cappella over a live-action photo montage of the people who worked on the show.

== See also ==
- Tiny Toon Adventures
- Animaniacs
- Freakazoid!
- Toonsylvania
- Once Upon a Time... Man
- Max, the 2000-Year-Old Mouse
- The Wonderful Stories of Professor Kitzel
- History Bites
- Time Squad
- Mr. Peabody & Sherman
- Horrible Histories
