= Ian James Corlett =

Canadian voice actor and author (born 1962)

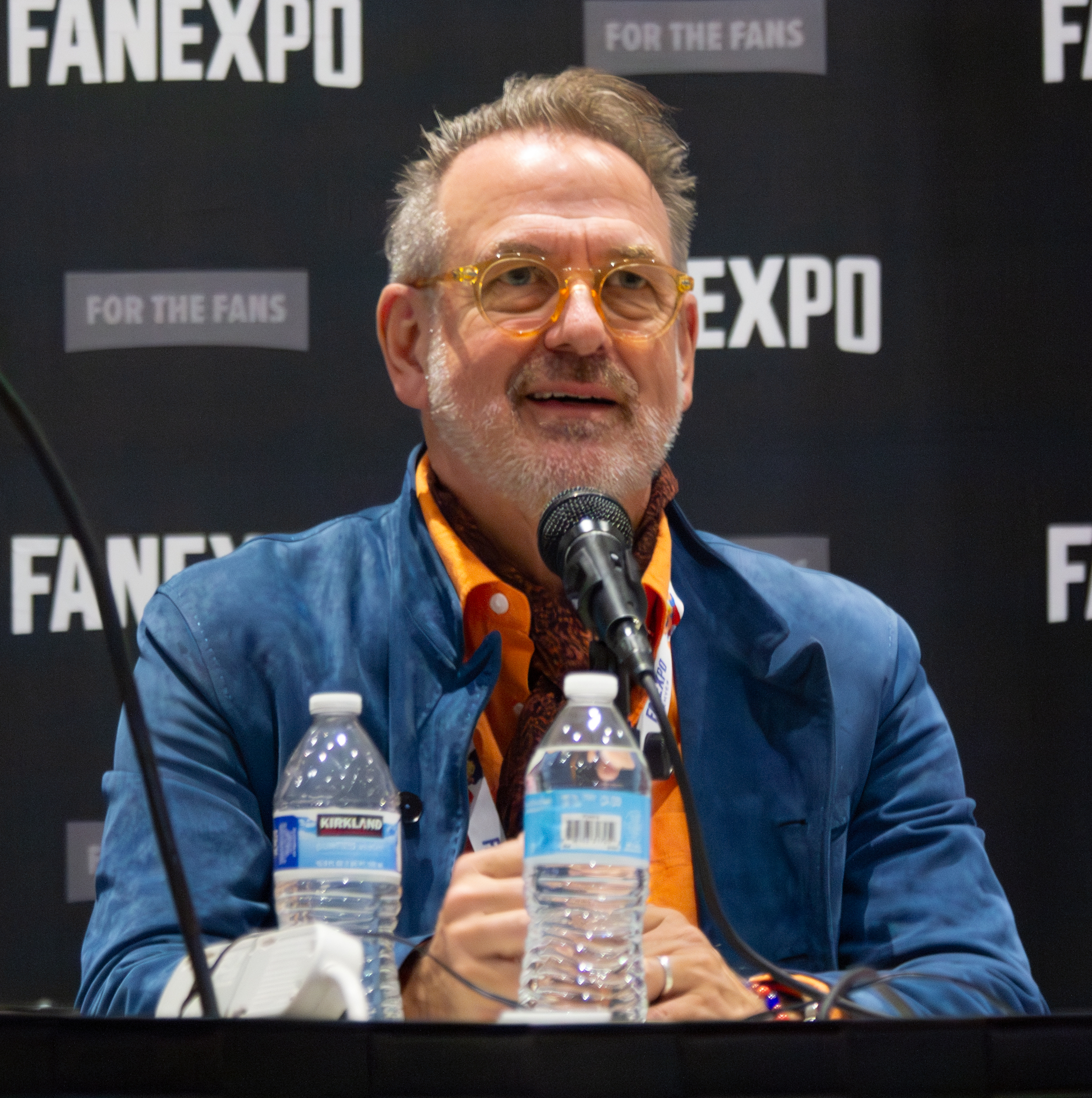
- Corlett in 2026
- Born: August 29, 1962 (age 64)
- Other name: Ian Corlett
- Occupations: Voice actor; author
- Years active: 1984–present
- Agent: Atlas Talent Agency
- Children: 2, including Claire
- Website: www.ianjamescorlett.com

Ian James Corlett (born August 29, 1962) is a Canadian voice actor and author. He is the creator of the animated series Being Ian and Yvon of the Yukon with Studio B Productions (merged with Nerd Corps Entertainment), with notable voice roles including Mega Man in Ruby-Spears' Mega Man series, Cheetor in Beast Wars: Transformers, Baby Taz in Baby Looney Tunes and the first English voice of adult Goku in the Ocean dub of Dragon Ball Z from 1996 to 1997.

== Early life ==
Corlett was born on August 29, 1962, the youngest of three sons to Eva (née Lasko) and Arthur Corlett, a music store owner.

In 1980, during his final year at Burnaby South Secondary School, Corlett made a video about life at the school starring his friend Alan McConnell getting into all sorts of antics, which became available on his YouTube channel in 2023 after sitting in an archive for 43 years.

== Career ==
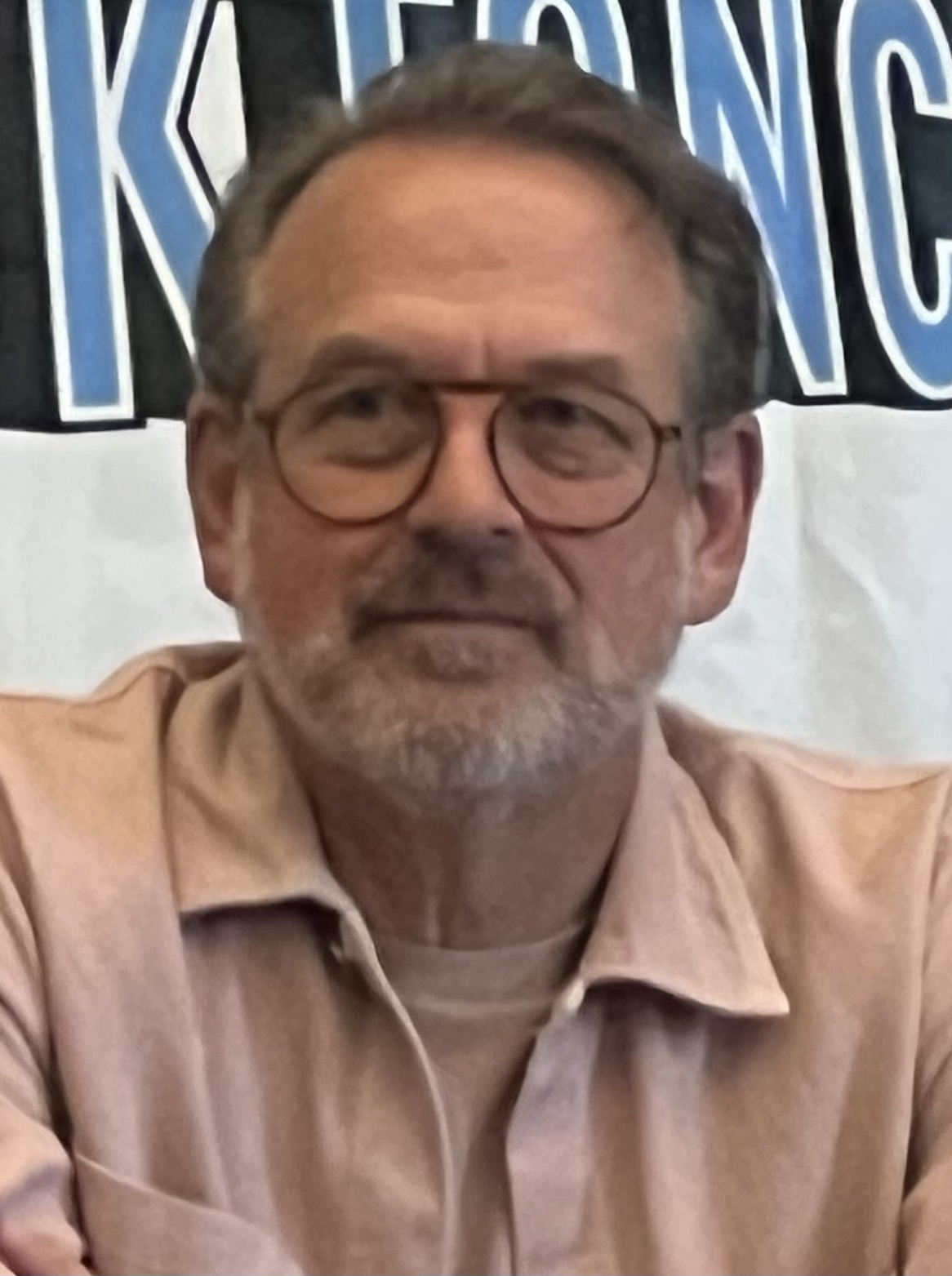
Corlett in 2023

Corlett began his career in 1984. Before becoming a voice actor, he programmed drum tracks and helped with computer sequences on Queensrÿche's album Operation: Mindcrime, also selling the band music gear in the 1980s. Corlett has lent his voice to several animated series produced/dubbed in Canada, with notable voice roles including Bob in ReBoot, Charger in NASCAR Racers, Baby Taz in Baby Looney Tunes, Funshine Bear in Care Bears: Adventures in Care-a-Lot, and Andy Larkin in What's with Andy?. Corlett has also lent his voice to DIC Entertainment shows such as Super Duper Sumos. He also voiced Mr. Cramp in The Cramp Twins, Ten Cents, Otis, Zeebee, Zip, Lord Stinker, Frank, Eddie, and the Lighthouse Clock in Salty's Lighthouse, and Ransome the Clown in the video game Thimbleweed Park.

He, along with fellow Canadian voice actor Terry Klassen, owned a production company that helped rewrite international shows. He is also the creator of the animated series Being Ian and Yvon of the Yukon.

In anime, Corlett has voiced Master Roshi in Dragon Ball Z and Miroku in Yashahime: Princess Half-Demon, replacing Kirby Morrow, who was the original English voice actor for Miroku in the Inuyasha series until his death on November 18, 2020.

== Personal life ==
Corlett lives in Vancouver with his wife, also having a home in Palm Springs, California. They have two children: Philip (b. 1997), and Claire (b. 1999). The Corletts have done voice work for the animated series Dinosaur Train and My Little Pony: Friendship Is Magic. In addition to his work in Vancouver, Corlett does voice work in Los Angeles, California, in the United States.

== Filmography ==
=== Film ===
List of voice and dubbing performances in direct-to-video and television films
Year	Title	Role	Notes	Source
1996	Adventures of Mowgli	Mowgli		
1997	Warriors of Virtue	Mayor Keena		
1997	The Fearless Four	Dr. Greed, 1st Assistant, additional voices	English dub	
2000	Help! I'm a Fish	1st fish waiting for bus		
2000	Casper's Haunted Christmas	Little Kid		
2001	Barbie in the Nutcracker	Captain Candy		
2002	Barbie as Rapunzel	Hobie, Palace Guard		
2003	Baby Looney Tunes' Eggs-traordinary Adventure	Baby Taz		
2003	Ben Hur	Gesius, Andrew, Another Man		
2003	Barbie of Swan Lake	Ivan		
2004	Barbie as the Princess and the Pauper	Wolfie, Guard #3		
2005	Candy Land: The Great Lollipop Adventure	Mr. Mint, Snow Beaver		
2007	Bratz Kidz: Sleep-Over Adventure	Mr. Wisping		
2007	Barbie as the Island Princess	Pat		
2007	Tom and Jerry: A Nutcracker Tale	Paulie		
2007	Bratz: Super Babyz	Newsperson #2, Announcer		
2008	Holly Hobbie & Friends: Fabulous Fashion Show	Gary Hobbie, Hanz		
2009	Holly Hobbie & Friends: Marvelous Makeover	Gary Hobbie		
2010	Altitude	Center Controller		
2011	Quest for Zhu	Mr. Squiggles, Stinker, Zhuquasha		
2013	Superman Unbound	Kryptonian #1		
2016	Ratchet & Clank	Blarg		
2016	Sausage Party	Apple, Bag of Dog Food, Ticklish Licorice, Relish		
2017	Bob the Builder: Mega Machines	Mr. Bentley	US dub	
2020	Greyhound	Dickie		
2022	Turning Red	Additional voices		
2023	Taz: Quest for Burger	Dad, Bill		

=== Anime ===
List of dubbing performances and production work in anime television series.
Year	Title	Role	Notes	Source
1993	Ranma ½	Dr. Tofu Ono, Mikado Sanzenin, Jusenkyo Guide	Viz dub	
1995	Dragon Ball	Master Roshi (eps. 7-8), Monster Carrot, Additional voices	BLT dub, script writer	
1996–97	Dragon Ball Z	Goku, Master Roshi, Cui, additional voices	Saban dub, episodes 1–37 (1–49 uncut)	
1997–98	Key the Metal Idol	Shuichi Tataki	OVA, episodes 1-9	
2002	Project A-Ko	Hikari Daitokuji	OVA	
2021–23	Yashahime: Princess Half-Demon	Miroku	Viz dub, replacing Kirby Morrow	
2022	Cyberpunk: Edgerunners	Pilar	Netflix dub	

List of dubbing performances in anime films.
Year	Title	Role	Notes	Source
1997	Dragon Ball Z: The Tree of Might	Goku, Master Roshi	Edited Saban dub	
1998	Ranma ½: Big Trouble in Nekonron, China	Mikado Sanzenin	Viz dub	

=== Animation ===
List of voice performances in animation
Year	Title	Role	Notes	Source
1989–91	Captain N: The Game Master	Dr. Wily		
1993–94	The Bots Master	Dr. Hiss		
1993	Adventures of Sonic the Hedgehog	Coconuts, Robotnik Jr., additional voices		
1994–2001	ReBoot	Bob / Glitch-Bob	Seasons 3 and 4	
1994–95	Mega Man	Mega Man, Rush, Snake Man, additional voices		
1995	Littlest Pet Shop	Elwood		
1996–98	Stickin' Around	Additional voices		
1996–98	Pocket Dragon Adventures	Filbert		
1996–99	Beast Wars: Transformers	Cheetor, Sentinel, Maximal Computer, Sea Clamp		
1996	Vor-Tech: Undercover Conversion Squad	Hardfire		
1996	Captain Zed and the Zee Zone	Mutter		
1997	The Wacky World of Tex Avery	Pompeii Pete, Einstone		
1998	Fat Dog Mendoza	Onion Boy, additional voices		
1998	Salty's Lighthouse	Ten Cents, Otis, Zeebee, Zip, Lord Stinker, Frank, Eddie, Lighthouse Clock		
1999–2000	Beast Machines: Transformers	Cheetor		
1999–2000	Weird-Ohs	Wade		
1999–2001	NASCAR Racers	Mark "Charger" McCutchen		
1999	Sonic Underground	Cyrus		
1999–2005	Dragon Tales	Cyrus	11 episodes	
2000–01	Action Man	Quake		
2000	D'Myna Leagues	Paully, Bart		
2000–04	Yvon of the Yukon	Willy Tidwell, King Louis, Gym Coach, additional voices	Also co-creator	
2001	The Zeta Project	Lowe	Episode: "Lost and Found"	
2001	Justice League	Thug, Sarge	2 episodes	
2001–02	Sagwa, the Chinese Siamese Cat	Wong Ton		
2001–03	Sitting Ducks	Bill, Cecil		
2001–04	The Cramp Twins	Horace Cramp, additional voices		
2001–07	What's with Andy?	Andy Larkin	Main role	
2002–09	Make Way for Noddy	Mr. Jumbo, Mr. Wobblyman, Clockwork Clown, additional voices	US re-dub	
2002–05	Baby Looney Tunes	Baby Taz		
2002–03	Yakkity Yak	Mr. Highpants, Rondo Jr., additional voices		
2003	Something Else	Something Else		
2003	Silverwing	Mercury, Scirocco, additional voices		
2005–08	Being Ian	Odbald, additional voices	Also creator and producer	
2005–13	Totally Spies!	Captain Hayes, James, additional voices	Recurring role	
2005–06	Alien Racers	Vakkon, Skrash		
2005–14	Johnny Test	Hugh Test, additional voices		
2007–08	Care Bears: Adventures in Care-a-Lot	Funshine Bear	Recurring role	
2007–08	Edgar & Ellen	Poe, Slug, additional voices	Recurring role	
2007–09	GeoTrax	Bunsen		
2008	3-2-1 Penguins	Wait Your Turner	Episode: "Invasion of the Body Swappers"	
2008–09	Monster Buster Club	Mark, Mr. Fusster, additional voices		
2009	League of Super Evil	Linemaster	Recurring role	
2009–20	Dinosaur Train	Mr. Conductor, additional voices		
2010–12	Hero: 108	ApeTrully, Mr. No Hands, Mighty Ray, additional voices		
2011–21	Ninjago	Skales, Chen, Clancee, Clutch Powers, additional voices		
2012	Action Dad	Baron Von Dash, Major Break, additional voices		
2012	Slugterra	Gar Revelle, Straggus	5 episodes	
2013–15	Pac-Man and the Ghostly Adventures	Blinky, Sir Cumference, additional voices		
2013	Beware the Batman	Joe Braxton	Episode: "Secrets"	
2013–14	Sabrina: Secrets of a Teenage Witch	Salem, additional voices		
2014	Nerds and Monsters	Skur, additional voices		
2014	My Little Pony: Friendship Is Magic	Silver Shill	Episode: "Leap of Faith"	
2014–15	Dr. Dimensionpants	The Cortex		
2015	Pirate Express	Poseidon, Gordon		
2015–17	Bob the Builder	Roley, Mr. Bentley	US dub	
2016–19	Ready Jet Go!	Uncle Zucchini, Mr. Peterson		
2016–25	The Loud House	Jeffery, Lincoln's Double, additional voices		
2017–21	Vampirina	Chef Remy Bones		
2018–20	The Hollow	Benjamin		
2018	The Adventures of Kid Danger	Announcer, Hipster, additional voices		
2019–22	The Dragon Prince	King Ahling, Ibis	8 episodes	
2021–23	Sharkdog	Mr. Heubel		
2023, 2026	Family Guy	Additional voices		
2025	Devil May Cry	VP Baines	2 episodes; replacing Kevin Conroy	
2025	Super Team Canada	Coach Chaos, Gary	2 episodes	
2025	The Bad Guys: The Series	Baron Von Tuskington	Episode: "It's a Hard Heist Life"	
2025	Dr. Seuss's The Sneetches	Paul Puddlesnuff		

=== Video games ===
List of voice performances in video games
Year	Title	Role	Notes	Source
1999	Transformers: Beast Wars Transmetals	Cheetor, Sentinel, Quickstrike		
2004	Dragon Tales: Learn & Fly With Dragons	Cyrus		
2005	Devil Kings	Chōsokabe Motochika (Arslan)	English dub	
2005	Candy Land DVD Game	Mr. Mint		
2017	Marvel vs. Capcom: Infinite	Firebrand		
2017	Thimbleweed Park	Ransome		
2019	ReadySet Heroes	Sully		
2020	G.I. Joe: Operation Blackout	Duke, Crew Man, Wild Bill		
2020	Cobra Kai: The Karate Kid Saga Continues	Tom Cole, Mitch, Big Boned Skeleton		
2021	Nier Reincarnation	Carrier, Substitute Carrier	English dub	
2021	Chivalry 2	Squire Boy		
2022	Destiny 2: The Witch Queen	Fynch		
2023	Overwatch 2: Season 6	Reggie Buckworth	Story missions: Liberation	
2024	Final Fantasy VII Rebirth	Dio	English dub	
2025	Marvel Rivals	Reed Richards/Mr. Fantastic		
2025	Game of Thrones: Kingsroad	Davion		
2026	Grand Theft Auto VI	The Local Population		

== Bibliography ==
- E is for Ethics (Simon & Schuster, Atria Books, 2009; ISBN 9781416596691)
- E is for Environment (Simon & Schuster, Atria Books, 2011; ISBN 9781439194577)
