= Rhode Montijo =

American author and illustrator

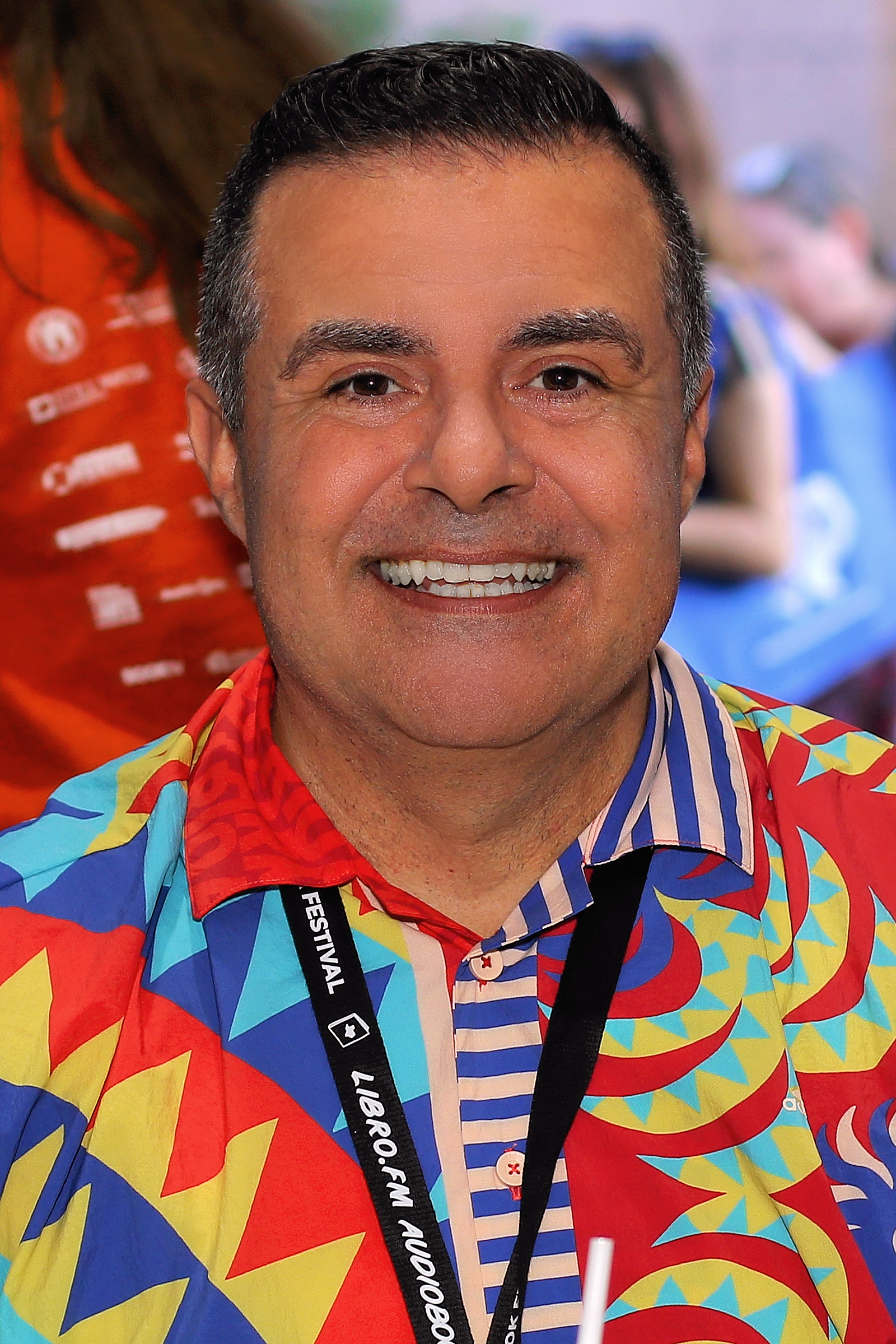
- Montijo at the 2025 Texas Book Festival
- Born: September 7, 1973 (age 53) El Centro, California, U.S.
- Areas: Writer; Penciller; Inker
- Notable works: Pablo's Inferno; Cloud Boy; Happy Tree Friends (co-creator)

External image
- Rhode Montijo from the Macmillan web site

Rhode Montijo (born September 7, 1973) is an American children's book author and illustrator best known as the creator of Pablo's Inferno, Cloud Boy and co-creator of the Flash cartoon Happy Tree Friends.

== Career ==
Raised in Stockton, California, Montijo is most known for being one of the creators of the award-winning comic book series Pablo's Inferno, about a little boy's descent into the spirit world in Mexico. Montijo originally gained attention for being one of the creators of the Mondo Media animated internet series Happy Tree Friends, one of the earliest YouTube viral sensations and subject of a 2006 television series.

Prior to co-creating Happy Tree Friends, Montijo also worked as a Character Designer on two other shows also made by Mondo Media, like Thugs on Film and Piki & Poko: Adventures in Starland.

After a car accident in 2006, Montijo set out to pursue his life-long passion in creating children's books. His first children's book published was the acclaimed Cloud Boy in 2006 by Simon & Schuster, about a little cloud boy who creates the shapes that are seen in clouds. Starting in 2007, Montijo illustrated a series of eight chapter books titled Melvin Beederman Superhero, written by Greg Trine and published by Henry Holt Company. In 2009 Montijo self-published and distributed Skeletown, a Dia De Los Muertos / Day of the Dead-inspired story of a town populated with skeletal inhabitants. In 2010, Montijo created The Halloween Kid about a mysterious masked boy who becomes the defender of Halloween. In 2012, production began on a half-hour animated holiday special based on The Halloween Kid with animation by Sanzigen Company in Japan, with Montijo directing.

After 13 years of production, the animated adaptation of The Halloween Kid finally premiered on October 22nd, 2025, via David Choe’s Youtube Channel.

In 2012, Montijo began a new children's chapter book series titled The Gumazing Gum Girl!, published by Disney/Hyperion, about gum-obsessed Gabby Gomez who accidentally turns into the sticky/stretchy superhero Gum Girl. In 2015 Montijo did the character designs for the Amazon Prime children's animated pilot, Knickerbock Teetertop, about the smallest kid in Wonderpine Mountain who yearns to be a great adventurer like his grandfather. Montijo has also provided character designs for Laika Pictures and Warner Brothers Animation.

== Bibliography ==
- Pablo's Inferno (5-issue comic book mini-series) (Abismo, 1999)
- Cloud Boy (Simon & Schuster, 2006, ISBN 9781416916581)
- The Three Swingin' Pigs Illustrator (Henry Holt & Company, 2007, ISBN 978-0-8050-7335-5)
- Melvin Beederman Superhero (Chapter Book Series) (2006-2010): Illustrator
  - Melvin Beederman Superhero v1 : Curse of the Bologna Sandwich Illustrator (144 pages, Henry Holt & Company, 2006, ISBN 9780805078367)
  - Melvin Beederman Superhero v2: The Revenge of the McNasty Brothers Illustrator (144 pages, Henry Holt & Company, 2006, ISBN 9780805079296)
  - Melvin Beederman Superhero v3: The Grateful Fred Illustrator (144 pages, Henry Holt & Company, 2006, ISBN 9780805079227)
  - Melvin Beederman Superhero v4: Terror in Tights Illustrator (144 pages, Henry Holt & Company, 2007, ISBN 9780805079241)
  - Melvin Beederman Superhero v5 The Fake Cape Caper Illustrator (144 pages, Henry Holt & Company, 2007, ISBN 9780805081596)
  - Melvin Beederman Superhero v6: Attack of the Valley Girls Illustrator (144 pages, Henry Holt & Company, 2008, ISBN 9780805081619)
  - Melvin Beederman Superhero v7: Brotherhood of the Traveling Underpants Illustrator (144 pages, Henry Holt & Company, 2009, ISBN 9780805081633)
  - Melvin Beederman Superhero v8: Invasion from Planet Dork Illustrator (149 pages, Henry Holt & Company, 2010, ISBN 9780805079241)
- T-t-tartamudo (mini comic book) (Abismo, 2010)
- The Halloween Kid (Simon & Schuster, 2010, ISBN 9781416935759)
- Skeletown (preview book) (Abismo, 2011)
- Lucky Luis Illustrator (Putnam, 2012, ISBN 9780399245046)
- Super Grammar Illustrator (Scholastic, 2012, ISBN 978-0-545-42515-5)
- The Gumazing Gum Girl! (Disney-Hyperion, 2013–present ), 5 volumes
- Skeletown: Hola. ¡Adiós! ( Little, Brown Books for Young Readers, 2025) ISBN 978-0316465144

== See also ==
- Big Umbrella
