= Detention (American TV series) =

American animated TV series

- Genre: Comedy
- Created by: Bob Doucette
- Developed by: Julie McNally-Cahill; Tim Cahill; Michael Maler
- Voices of: Carlos Alazraqui; Tara Charendoff; Bob Doucette; Roger Eschbacher; Pamelyn Ferdin; Kathleen Freeman; Mary Gross; Tia Mowry; Tamera Mowry; Billy West
- Composers: Steve Rucker; Thomas Chase
- Country of origin: United States
- Original language: English
- No. of seasons: 1
- No. of episodes: 13

Production
- Executive producer: Jean MacCurdy
- Running time: 21 minutes
- Production company: Warner Bros. Television Animation

Original release
- Network: Kids' WB
- Release: September 11, 1999 – March 25, 2000

Detention is an American animated television series created by Bob Doucette and produced by Warner Bros. Television Animation that ran on Kids' WB from September 11, 1999, to March 25, 2000. 13 half-hour episodes were produced.

== Synopsis ==
The series is about a diverse group of eight stubborn 6th grade students from Benedict Arnold Middle School in the fictional U.S. town of Oak Forest who continually find themselves in detention overseen by the detention warden Eugenia P. Kisskillya. The kids are constantly trying to stay out of detention and out of trouble.

== Characters ==
=== Main characters ===
- Eugenia P. Kisskillya (voiced by Kathleen Freeman) – The Eastern European-American gym teacher and detention warden of Benedict Arnold Middle School who is the rival antagonist to her class. Having been a military sergeant in the United States Marine Corps, Miss Kisskillya bosses the children around like such, calls other people by military rankings, bringing up some moments of her military past, and usually pronounces "detention" as "dee-tennnn-shun!!". Despite usually being tyrannical towards the children, she has been shown to be a very nice person and has a soft spot for them. She is based on the creator's grade schoolteacher who was a nun, as well as Freeman's character, the strict Sister Mary Stigmata, from The Blues Brothers and Blues Brothers 2000.
- Shareena Wickett (voiced by Tara Charendoff) – A gothic 12-year-old girl that prefers to be a free spirit and finds pleasure in the sublime. Shareena's beliefs are not taken seriously by her parents. Her hobbies include reading horror fiction stories. She has a talent for séances.
  - Pig - Shareena's pet pig. While originally thought to be a male pig, it was discovered that Pig is actually a female pig in "The Blame Game"
- Shelley Kelly (voiced by Pamelyn Ferdin) – An optimistic and peppy redheaded girl who always wears the same Ladybug Scout uniform and the only kid in detention not due to rule breaking, but because she is a teacher's pet to Ms. Kisskillya as she refers to Shelley as "Private Kelly". She is constantly kissing up to Miss Kisskillya (hence her name) and has a crush on Emmitt. As a result, she is often detested by the other kids for her toxically cheerful demeanor who she wishes to be friends with (she seems to have succeeded with Shareena to an extent). However, on some occasions, Shelley is an ally to the other kids as she will tend to go with their plans.
- Emmitt Roswell (voiced by Billy West) – A conspiracy theorist and ufologist who states that intelligent extraterrestrial life exists in outer space. He is determined to make contact with aliens. As stated in "Boyz 'N the Parenthood", Emmitt seems to have an estranged father who may believe in his son's wild obsession for aliens.
- Jim Kim (voiced by the series' writer Roger Eschbacher) – A timid, geeky Korean-American kid with an affinity for comic books, particularly the heroes of DC Comics. He takes on the characters' attributes at inopportune times.
- Ramone "Gug" Gugliamo (voiced by Carlos Alazraqui) – A short Latino-American kid with a very short temper. Constantly being left out of competitive sports, Gug constantly picks fights with other kids twice his own size and has even wanted to take down Miss Kisskillya. He and Emmitt have their occasional rivalries. However, they both agree on their lack of patience with Jim.
- Duncan Bubble – A deaf, silent boy who is always playing with a yo-yo he is usually seen with and not speaking. He instead uses his yo-yo to spell out messages (for example, "Thanks guys", "Boring", and "Yeah") accompanied by an electronic voice (done by the show's creator Bob Doucette) reading the message. He is based on a deaf friend Doucette (the show's creator) had during production.
- Lemonjella and Orangejella LaBelle (voiced by Tia Mowry and Tamera Mowry) – A pair of identical female African-American twins (wore orange and yellow-colored fashion, but named after citrus flavors). They have been known to get themselves in trouble by hacking into the school computers and removing library fines. Their scientific descriptions tend to confuse Miss Kisskillya and the other kids, so they would tend to simplify them to make sense. Lemonjella and Orangejella have shown to be very competitive with each other.

=== Recurring characters ===
- Patsy Wickett (voiced by Mary Gross) - The mother of Shareena.
- Mr. Wickett (voiced by Billy West) - The father of Shareena.
- Mr. Fletcher (voiced by Bob Doucette) - The science teacher at Benedict Arnold Middle School.

== Broadcast and home media ==
In Autumn 1999, the show aired on Saturdays at 10:30 a.m. and later moved to 11:00 a.m. EST beginning on November 6. In Spring 2000, the show moved to 11:30 a.m. EST on Saturdays. Reruns of the show aired on the Kids' WB Friday afternoon lineup from September 8, 2000, to August 31, 2001, but never reran on Cartoon Network nor its spinoff Boomerang. Since 2018, the show has been available on iTunes and on DVD in Region 1 as a manufacture-on-demand (MOD) release that is only available through the Warner Archive website and other online stores.

== Episodes ==
Season	Episodes	Originally released	
Season	Episodes	First released	Last released
1	13	September 11, 1999	March 25, 2000

Episode list
No.	Title	Directed by	Written by	Storyboard by	Original release date	Prod. code
1	"Shareena Takes the Cake"	Mike Milo	Michael Maler	Bob Doucette, Scott Jeralds, Javier Secaduras, Trevor Wall & Marcus Williams	September 11, 1999	101
Shareena misses her chance to get tickets to a rock concert because Miss Kisskillya gives her detention. She decides to team up with Shelley in the Home Economics Bake-Off to get even with her by baking a volcano cake, which she deliberately pours too much baking soda into. Meanwhile, Emmitt, Gug, Jim, and Duncan try to get Duncan's yo-yo back from Miss Kisskillya. After Shelley tells Shareena she will take her to the concert if their cake wins the contest, Miss Kisskillya puts the vinegar in the volcano cake causing it to blow up in her face, before the boys, after getting Duncan's yo-yo, fall through the ceiling from the air duct and land on Miss Kisskillya. Although Miss Kisskillya finds all this to be fun, she gives her class detention for damaging school property. Note: This episode was sneak-previewed on September 10, 1999 at 4:00 p.m. Friday afternoon on Kids WB before its actual premiere on September 11th during the last day of The Top 20 Pokéthon Countdown.
2	"The Man with the Golden Brain"	Scott Jeralds	Roger Eschbacher	Scott Jeralds, Tim Maltby & Joe Sichta	September 18, 1999	102
The gang represents the school in a spelling bee, to which Lemonjella and Orangejella get competitive with each other. Meanwhile, Emmitt suspects that the Principal McQueen is a brain-stealing alien cyborg and tries to gather evidence to prove it. After Lemonjella and Orangejella get themselves disqualified from the spelling bee, Gug wins, and Emmitt thinks Mr. McQueen is going to steal Gug's brain, but he's really giving him a gold brain as his prize, thus proving Emmitt's conspiracy theory wrong.
3	"What Did You Séance?"	Stephen Lewis	Julie McNally Cahill & Timothy Cahill	Hyunsook Cho, Bob Doucette, Scott Jeralds, Stephen Lewis, Tim Maltby & Rose Rosely	September 25, 1999	103
As Benedict Arnold Middle School is throwing a disco-themed "Friday the 13th" prom, the kids are getting ready for the dance while Shareena stumbles upon an old photo of her great-aunt Hanna and plans to perform a séance to contact her from the dead. Meanwhile, Emmitt is planning to contact with UFOs that are set to arrive on the school roof, and Shelley joins him. An hour after the predicted arrival, no aliens appear. Shareena's seance is interrupted when Pig runs to the roof with the photo (before eating it) and throws a bowl of fruit punch on Miss Kisskillya, who attempts to catch the students by climbing up the wall to the roof, but is caught in Emmitt's alien trap and gives her class detention.
4	"The Contest"	Mike Milo	Steven Shaw	Javier Secaduras, Trevor Wall & Marcus Williams	October 9, 1999	104
When Miss Kisskillya tells the kids that they are destined for detention, they hold a contest to see who can stay out of it, except for Shelly, who tries to get in detention instead. Gug gets detention for disobeying his Home Ec teacher, Emmitt and Jim get detention when Jim throws ink in science teacher Mr. Fletcher's face due to Emmitt's conspiracy theory, Duncan gets detention for trying to take back his confiscated yo-yos from Mr. McQueen, and Lemonjella and Orangejella get detention for hacking the school computers. Shareena stays out of trouble, and when Miss Kisskillya makes her run an obstacle course in gym class under threat of detention if she fails, she completes it, to Miss Kisskillya's dismay. However, she chooses to join her classmates in detention by spraying Miss Kisskillya with a water gun, while all of Shelley's attempts to get detention are unsuccessful.
5	"Too Good to Be Truant"	Stephen Lewis	Michael Maler	Hyunsook Cho, Tim Maltby & Rose Rosely	October 23, 1999	105
Shareena and Shelley decide to skip school and Miss Kisskillya tries to find them. Meanwhile, Emmitt and Gug try to compete for class president, throwing Jim, Lemonjella & Orangella in between. Shareena loses her wallet and, unable to pay at the restaurant, she and Shelley are forced to wash dishes, before they go to the mall, where they notice Miss Kisskillya looking for them. After getting stuck in an elevator, they escape her. Emmitt and Gug try to smear each other during their campaign and eventually get disqualified. When Shareena and Shelley return to school, Miss Kisskillya overhears Shareena talking about her adventure (thus confessing to skipping school in front of her) and gives her detention, along with the rest of the class for withholding information from her, except Shelley, whom she thinks was Shareena's hostage.
6	"Breaking Out"	Scott Jeralds	Julie McNally Cahill & Timothy Cahill	Scott Jeralds, Scott Hill, Tim Maltby, Norma Klingler, Stephen Sandoval, Joe Sichta & Trevor Wall	November 6, 1999	106
Desperate to meet Sean Gregory, the TV star of their favorite show, at a bookstore, the kids plot to sneak away from Saturday detention. As Miss Kisskillya is in her office with Shelley, Shareena and the others sneak out through a secret tunnel dug by a previous detention class. In large part due to Duncan being extremely helpful with his yo-yo, and despite Jim slowing them down, they reach the bookstore in time to get autographed posters from Sean Gregory. Miss Kisskillya also sneaks out to meet Sean Gregory, but is too late, and Shareena forces her to back down from giving them detention by threatening to tell Mr. McQueen that she left her students at school alone.
7	"Comedy of Terrors"	Mike Milo & Tim Maltby	Michael Maler	Norma Klingler, Javier Secaduras, Trevor Wall & Marcus Williams	November 13, 1999	107
Shareena auditions to play Hamlet in a school play, but when she accidentally throws mud at Miss Kisskillya during the audition, Miss Kisskillya disqualifies her and gives the role to Gug, prompting Shareena to seek revenge. Meanwhile, when Pig damages Emmitt's science project by sitting on it, Emmitt suspects that Gug sabotaged it and seeks revenge on him during the play, but when Shareena locks Gug in the costume shop and takes his place as Hamlet, she falls victim to Emmitt's traps instead. Gug breaks out of the costume shop and duels Shareena out of revenge, but loses, before revealing that Pig was the real saboteur of Emmitt's science project and he didn't tell Emmitt to keep Shareena out of trouble. After the three reconcile, Miss Kisskillya falls victim to Emmitt's final trap, with the stage collapsing on her, and she gives her class detention.
8	"Little Miss Popular"	Stephen Lewis	Wendell Morris & Tom Sheppard	Hyunsook Cho, Tim Maltby, David Mink & Rose Rosely	November 20, 1999	108
The gang get chosen to compete in a TV quiz show, with Miss Kisskillya threatening them with eternal detention if they lose. Shareena ditches her classmates to join a trio of popular girls called The Vanities to get close to their leader's brother, Darth, whom she has a crush on. Without Shareena to answer questions on TV trivia, the others decide to cheat by using an envelope containing the answers; however, Shareena abandons The Vanities for being too shallow and mean-spirited and rejoins her classmates, convincing them not to cheat. The opposing team attempts to cheat themselves, but due to the theft of the envelope, different questions are used, and after the teams are tied, Shareena wins the game for her team by answering a question on TV trivia, sparing them from detention.
9	"Capitol Punishment"	Scott Jeralds	Michael Maler	Scott Hill, Tim Maltby, Norma Klingler, Tristin Roesch, Joe Sichta & Trevor Wall	December 4, 1999	109
Shelley wins an essay contest for a trip to Washington, D.C., and takes the rest of the gang along with Miss Kisskillya with her, however, she is accidentally left behind while going back for baggage claim tickets and has to ride a bus full of ex-convicts to Washington. Meanwhile, Emmitt spots a man following them at the hotel and suspects that he is a spy involved in a secret plan to overthrow the government, and tries to sneak out to inform the FBI with the rest of the kids except Shareena, who is given a tour of Washington by Miss Kisskillya, discovering a hidden fun side to her. After everyone reunites and they go to the White House, Emmitt pulls the fire alarm and sets off the sprinklers when he sees the "spy", only to learn that he is really the White House tour correspondent who was trying to give them their passes for the tour. Miss Kisskillya gives her class (minus Shareena and Shelley) detention, but also gives them a fun tour of the White House.
10	"The Blame Game"	Tim Maltby	Charles M. Howell IV	Norma Klingler, Trevor Wall & Marcus Williams	January 8, 2000	110
Miss Kisskillya assigns Emmitt to clean the boiler room, which Shareena says is haunted by the ghost of a detention student, Christopher Crandall, to which Gug is skeptical. When Miss Kisskillya's book, among other objects at school, is mysteriously stolen, she blames Lemonjella and Orangejella, threatening her class with detention if she doesn't get her book back, so Lemonjella, Orangejella, Shareena, and Shelley investigate the theft to clear their name. As Miss Kisskillya, suffering from a toothache, tries to pull her tooth, Jim enters the seemingly-locked boiler room through the chute to rescue Emmitt, and they encounter the ghost, prompting Duncan to get the girls; however, the ghost is really a trick by Gug. After Duncan and the girls enter the boiler room, the gang ram the door just as Miss Kisskilya is opening it, knocking out her tooth. It is revealed the door was not locked, but jammed, and Christopher Crandall had left the boiler room through the fire escape and moved away with his family. The thief is discovered to be Pig, who stole the items to care for her piglets, thus revealing Pig to be female. Out of gratitude for getting rid of her aching tooth, and regret for wrongly accusing Lemonjella and Orangejella, Miss Kisskillya lets her class wait until next week to clean the boiler room.
11	"Boyz 'N the Parenthood"	Stephen Lewis & Bob Doucette	Julie McNally Cahill & Timothy Cahill	Hyunsook Cho, Scott Jeralds, David Mink, Joe Sichta & Rose Rosely	February 5, 2000	111
The gang gets paired with each other to take care of water balloons as an assignment for parenting. The boys leave the girls with the balloons over the weekend, and Shareena gets revenge by putting more water in the balloons and giving them to the boys on a museum field trip on Monday. Emmitt takes better care of his and Shareena's balloon after being stood up by his father on the weekend. Unable to turn their balloons' crying alarms off due to their increased size, Gug, Jim, and Duncan are confronted by a security guard and accidentally throw their balloons on Miss Kisskillya, causing them to pop, forcing them and their respective partners, Lemonjella, Orangejella, and Shelley, to repeat the project and (presumably excluding Shelley) get detention but not Shareena and Emmitt who succeeded their project.
12	"A Friend in Greed"	Scott Jeralds	Michael Maler	Alex Almaguer, Scott Jeralds, David Mink, Tim Maltby, Joe Sichta & Trevor Wall	March 4, 2000	112
Lemonjella and Orangejella find a map marking the location of buried treasure. However, they fight over the map, accidentally tearing it in two, while Shareena conspires with Emmitt, Gug, Jim, and Duncan to pretend to help them and then double cross them and split the treasure five ways; Shareena and Emmitt get greedy and separately plan to share the treasure only with Gug and Jim, respectively; Gug also greedily demands Shareena's share of the treasure in exchange for saving her when she sinks into mud they think is quicksand (only for him to sink as well, and Duncan pulls them both out with his yo-yo). After reuniting and arguing, the gang work together to locate the treasure. Spying on them, Miss Kisskillya seeks the treasure herself, but gets chased by bees, trips over a snake, is chased by a bear, stung by the bees, and kicked off a cliff by a moose, landing on a bush of poison oak. Despite this, she finds the treasure due to the students' greed slowing them down, but a misinterpretation of words at the unveiling of the treasure leads the mayor to believe that she is donating the money to build the Fantasy Fun Center (when her true intent was to give her class detention), essentially forcing her to do so.
13	"Rule the School"	Tim Maltby	Michael Maler	Tim Maltby, Norma Klingler, Trevor Wall & Marcus Williams	March 25, 2000	113
When Miss Kisskillya promotes Gug as Benedict Arnold's new hall monitor, he goes mad with power by issuing detentions to his friends and classmates, and even Principal McQueen and Pig. Meanwhile, Shareena plans a house party while her parents are out of town, but when one of her invitations accidentally ends up in the teacher's lounge, she enters through the window to get it and is caught by Gug. After giving his full report to Miss Kisskillya, Gug is informed by Lemonjella and Orangejella that Shareena was getting his invitation for her party. Remorseful, Gug gets the report back from Miss Kisskillya with help from Duncan. Gug tears up the report and Pig eats it. All of Shareena's classmates and teachers attend the party celebrating her parents' anniversary.
