= Pablo's Inferno =

Pablo
- Pablo's Inferno Issue One; Art by Rhode Montijo

Publication information
- First appearance: Pablo's Inferno #1
- Created by: Rhode Montijo

In-story information
- Alter ego: Pablo
- Team affiliations: Quetzal, El Calambre

Pablo's Inferno is a five-issue indie comic limited series created and produced by Rhode Montijo. The comic owes its title to Inferno, the first cantica of Dante Alighieri's Divine Comedy, and according to Montijo is something of a parody:

My friend Dan Chapman, and I, just brainstormed. He knew that I liked to draw monsters, so we came up with the idea of what if there was a little kid who went to hell...just an excuse to draw monsters...it's kind of like a parody of "Dante's Inferno." We ripped on the title and made it a comedic "Dante's Inferno.

== Plot ==
The comic follows the story of Pablo James, a young boy whose life is ended in an unfortunate hit-and-run accident, ends up in hell and has to traverse the underworld in search of answers. Along the way he meets several colorful characters such as Quetzal, an ancient Aztec god, and El Calambre, the ghost of a once-famous masked wrestler.

== Possible film adaptation ==
As the comic's popularity grew, Montijo was often questioned on the possibility of a Pablo's Inferno film adaptation. Although open to the idea, he is doubtful of the outcome:

Some people have seen it and they like it, but they think it's too big in scope. Some people are a little afraid of it. But I would love to, some day.
