= Tim Cahill (producer) =

American producer, writer and animator

- Other name: Timothy Cahill
- Occupations: Producer, writer, director, animator
- Years active: 1995–present
- Notable work: My Gym Partner's a Monkey; Littlest Pet Shop; The Gumazing Gum Girl!
- Spouse: Julie McNally Cahill (m. 2000)

Tim Cahill is an American producer, writer, director, and animator who co-created the Cartoon Network series My Gym Partner's a Monkey with his wife Julie McNally Cahill. He, along with his wife, have co-developed and are story editors for the 2012 Littlest Pet Shop series, and is a writer for The High Fructose Adventures of Annoying Orange. He and his wife also worked for Warner Bros. on Histeria, Detention, Animaniacs, The Sylvester & Tweety Mysteries, Baby Looney Tunes, Mucha Lucha, and Krypto the Superdog.

== Screenwriting ==
=== Television ===
- series head writer denoted in bold

- The Sylvester & Tweety Mysteries (1997–1998)
- **Histeria!** (1998–2000)
- **Detention** (1999–2000)
- Baby Looney Tunes (2002)
- Tutenstein (2004)
- ¡Mucha Lucha! (2004–2005)
- Krypto the Superdog (2005)
- My Gym Partner's a Monkey (2005–2007)
- Sherm! (2006)
- The High Fructose Adventures of Annoying Orange (2012–2013)
- **Littlest Pet Shop** (2012–2016)
- Transformers: Robots in Disguise (2017)
- The Tom and Jerry Show (2018–2019)
- **The Gumazing Gum Girl!** (TBA)

=== Films ===
- Carrotblanca (1995)
- Tweety’s High-Flying Adventure (2000)
- Tom and Jerry: The Magic Ring (2001)
- Baby Looney Tunes' Eggs-traordinary Adventure (2003)

== Director ==
- series director denoted in bold
- **My Gym Partner's a Monkey** (2005–2008)
