= Baby Looney Tunes =

American animated television series

- Genre: Comedy; Preschool
- Based on: Looney Tunes by Warner Bros.
- Developed by: Sander Schwartz
- Directed by: Ron Myrick (season 4)
- Voices of: Sam Vincent; Britt McKillip; Ian James Corlett; Terry Klassen; Janyse Jaud; Chiara Zanni; June Foray; Brian Drummond
- Theme music composer: Lisa Silver; Patty Way
- Opening theme: "The Baby Looney Tunes Way" by Lisa Silver and Patty Way
- Ending theme: "The Baby Looney Tunes Way" (Instrumental)
- Composers: Steve Bernstein; Julie Bernstein
- Country of origin: United States
- Original language: English
- No. of seasons: 4
- No. of episodes: 53 (104 segments) (list of episodes)

Production
- Executive producer: Sander Schwartz
- Producers: Tom Minton; Gloria Yuh Jenkins (seasons 1–3); Ron Myrick (season 4)
- Editors: Mark McNally (seasons 1–3); Julie Anne Lau (season 4)
- Running time: 22 minutes
- Production company: Warner Bros. Animation (Note: Credited as Warner Bros. Television Animation from 2002 to 2003.)

Original release
- Network: Cartoon Network
- Release: September 16, 2002 – April 20, 2005

Baby Looney Tunes is an American animated television series depicting toddler versions of several Looney Tunes characters. It was produced by Warner Bros. Animation as its first preschool animated series. The series focused on real world problems and morals that children may relate to, such as sharing, understanding emotions, and playing with others. The Looney Tunes babies first live with Granny, but in the fourth season, were cared for by babysitter Floyd, Granny's nephew.

The show premiered as a full series on September 7, 2002, and ran on WB stations from 2002 to 2003. The show moved to Cartoon Network in 2002 (by following suit nine days later on September 16) where it remained until ending on April 20, 2005. It aired in reruns on Cartoon Network and also on Boomerang from 2005 to 2009, and again from 2015 to 2016, and has since been added back to their lineup. 53 episodes were produced.

The series also aired in reruns on the American version of Cartoonito on Cartoon Network from September 13, 2021 to December 17, 2023, being the first show to air on that block, and currently airs in the United States on MeTV Toons and Boomerang.

== Episodes ==
Season	Episodes	Originally released	
Season	Episodes	First released	Last released
1	13	September 16, 2002	October 2, 2002
2	13	October 3, 2002	October 28, 2002
3	12	October 29, 2002	December 31, 2002
4	13	April 4, 2005	April 20, 2005
Film		February 11, 2003	

== Characters ==
=== Main ===
- Baby Bugs (voiced by Sam Vincent) – He is known to be the oldest of the babies (but only just), which makes him their delegated leader. His leadership however does tend to cause arguments, especially with Daffy and Lola.
- Baby Daffy (voiced by Sam Vincent) – He is the second-in-command of the babies. When he does not get what he wants, he believes he is treated unfairly, not noticing the inconvenience inflicted on the others, but he does have a good heart. He is known to have a fear of robots, and quite frequently, he has made fun of Bugs by making fun of his name and other things.
- Baby Sylvester (voiced by Terry Klassen) – A tuxedo cat who is often shy and anxious. He makes an easy target for Daffy to mock and take advantage of. He is rarely seen using his claws. He likes to get attention from Granny more than the others. Sylvester is afraid of lightning and hates pickles.
- Baby Tweety (voiced by Sam Vincent) – A yellow canary who is the youngest and smallest of the gang. Depicted as the logical thinker, because he comes up with ideas when the others are unable to. He is very insecure about his small build (which he must overcome in most episodes centered around him) and curious about what he encounters.
- Baby Taz (voiced by Ian James Corlett) – Whilst less aggressive and milder-mannered than his adult counterpart, Taz often mistakes various objects for food, and sometimes breaks things with his spin due to this. He has a sense of humor that exceeds all the others. He is sometimes more sensitive.
- Baby Lola (voiced by Britt McKillip) – Sometimes, she takes charge. Her independence is greater than the others and she has more boyish tendencies than the other girls, though she wears a purple bow in her hair.
- Granny (voiced by June Foray) – Granny is friendly, professional, intelligent, practical and level-headed. She offers unconditional love and care for the babies. Being the only adult in their lives, the babies are fascinated and inspired by her guidance, advice and ability to overcome problems when they arise with ease.

=== Recurring ===
- Baby Melissa (voiced by Janyse Jaud) – She is a duck, and often hangs out with Petunia; the two were abruptly added to the main cast early into the series' second season. She is a highly logical and practical girl with an easy-going personality, but at times, she can be a control freak and clash with the others. She wears a green bow in her hair.
- Baby Petunia (voiced by Chiara Zanni) – She often hangs out with Melissa; the two were abruptly added to the main cast early into the series' second season. She is the most intelligent of the babies with an adventurous streak. Starting in the episode "Band Together", she and the other babies stop wearing diapers, and Petunia wears yellow frilly training panties with a white bow in the middle. In "Petunia the Piggy Bank", she learned to save money. She has her hair tied in pigtails with two orange hair bows.
- Floyd Minton (voiced by Brian Drummond) – Granny's nephew, who is sometimes overwhelmed by the responsibility he takes on the babies, but is determined never to let Granny down. He often keeps an eye on one of the individual babies in each episode during Season 4.

=== Others ===
Several other Looney Tunes characters have made cameos over the course of the show's run, mainly as guest spots or during songs. Baby Marc Antony, Baby Prissy, and Baby Penelope appear in the songs, "Paws and Feathers", "Down by the Cage", and "Vive le Pew, le Skunk" respectively. Baby Marvin (Sam Vincent), Baby Elmer (Brian Drummond), Baby Instant Martians, Baby Gossamer, and Baby Foghorn (Scott McNeil) appear in "War of the Weirds", "New Cat in Town", "A Bully for Bugs", "A Mid-Autumn Night's Scream", "Cock a Doodle Do It!", and "Stop and Smell Up the Flowers", respectively. Baby Wile E. and Baby Road Runner appear in multiple songs, as do Baby Pepé (Terry Klassen), Baby Porky, Baby Speedy, and Baby Sam.

- Baby Marvin (voiced by Samuel Vincent) – An alien toddler from Mars. He appears in "War of The Weirds". He is timid and meek but friendly Martian who was visiting for a while. The babies thought he was "creepy" and hesitated to befriend him, yet Taz was the only one who was kind to him. The babies eventually realize their error and receive him as a friend, and he finally speaks to them.
- Elmer Fudd (voiced by Brian Drummond) – Appears as a baby in the songs, and as an older toddler in "A Bully for Bugs". In his only proper episode, he was a bully who harassed Bugs and stole his candy, and was bullying the other babies too. In the end, he admits that he felt alone and actually wanted to be friends with them. The babies soon forgave him and accepted him as a friend.
- Baby Foghorn (voiced by Scott McNeil) – Appears in "Cock-a-Doodle-Do It!". He's a young, somewhat neurotic, farm rooster who is ostracized by the older roosters. The other babies visiting, helps him to gain self-confidence and win the other roosters' respect. At the end, he handles a big dog with the help of his new friends, and finally becomes a respected member of the corral.
- Baby Pepé (voiced by Terry Klassen) – Appears first in "New Cat in Town" as an baby, and later in "Stop and Smell Up the Flowers" as an older toddler. In his first episode, the babies all mistook him for a cat and doted on him. Sylvester was initially jealous of him, but got over it when he heard Pepé say "Sylvester" as his first word. By his second appearance, he is working for a garden, but his skunk smell was an issue for the other babies, initially being put off by this. Eventually they apologize and truly accept him for who he is in the end. He is revealed to be friends with Baby Gossamer.

== Production ==
In January 2002, it was announced Warner Bros. Animation would be developing a TV series featuring baby versions of the Looney Tunes characters under the working title of Looney Tunes Babies. The idea for the series came about from the successful Looney Tunes Lovables (later revamped as Baby Looney Tunes) line of merchandise.

According to Tim Cahill, Baby Looney Tunes was meant to have a more comedic tone akin to earlier Looney Tunes-related projects, and also took inspiration from Hal Roach's Our Gang shorts. However, executives wanted the series to have a more lighter tone similar to Muppet Babies. Cahill found the change redundant as he felt that "the sweet 'Disney Babies/Muppet Babies' already exist[ed]."

As a cost-saving measure, the show hired Canadian voice actors rather than the current voice actors for the Looney Tunes characters, with the exception of Granny's actor June Foray, who'd voiced the character since the 1950s. As the show was aimed at an audience of 2- to 5-year-olds, the style of the show used softer pastel colors and watercolor backgrounds to reflect the gentler tone of the series. An educational expert also examined the series, even though it wasn't explicitly designed to be educational.

In 2003, a series of direct-to-video puppet films were produced, aimed at infants and toddlers in addition to the main series' preschool audience. The series was likely an attempt by Warner Bros. to compete with Disney's Baby Einstein series of videos, which was a multimillion-dollar hit at the time; the difference is that the Baby Looney Tunes DVDs used a popular music soundtrack and real-life situations, in contrast to Baby Einstein’s use of classical music, puppets, and simple close-ups of toys. Two films were released, Baby Looney Tunes: Musical Adventures and Baby Looney Tunes: Backyard Adventures, featuring the same voice cast as the TV series. The films were never released on DVD. However, Baby Looney Tunes: Musical Adventures later became available on HBO Max and Tubi. Baby Looney Tunes: Backyard Adventures was formerly available on Binge in Australia.

== Music ==
Underscoring for the series was written by veteran animation composers Steven and Julie Bernstein. They were nominated for a Daytime Emmy (Outstanding Music Direction and Composition) in 2006. They also composed the score for the Easter movie, Baby Looney Tunes' Eggs-traordinary Adventure, writing the music and lyrics for the featured songs.

== Reception ==
Animation historian Martin Goodman disdained the series and called its development "depressing", arguing that it lacked the adversarial spirit of the original Looney Tunes cartoons.

== Home media ==
Warner Home Video released 39 of the 53 episodes of Baby Looney Tunes, including the DVD of the only Baby Looney Tunes movie: Eggs-traordinary Adventure.

DVD name	Ep #	Release date	Special features
Eggs-traordinary Adventure	3	February 11, 2003	Two bonus episodes; Two music videos; Granny's Activity Day Challenge
Volumes 1 & 2	8	March 7, 2006	Menu Challenge: Baby Trivia
Volume 3: Puddle Olympics	8	March 13, 2007	
Volume 4: Tooth Fairy Tales	8	August 14, 2007	
4 Kid Favorites: Baby Looney Tunes	12	January 17, 2012	Menu Challenge: Baby Trivia; Menu Challenge: What's That Sound?

In the United Kingdom, four volumes were released on DVD on July 15, 2013. Each disc contains four half-hour episodes.

DVD name	Episodes listed	Release date
Baby Bugs Bunny	"Bruce Bunny / Baby Bunny / Leader of the Pack"; "Flower Power / Looney Tunes Zoo / Lightning Bugs Sylvester"; "Flush Hour / Paws and Feathers / I Strain"; "The Sandman Is Coming / Ten Loonies in a Bed / Some Assembly Required"	July 15, 2013
Baby Taz	"Creature from the Chocolate Chip / Born to Sing / Card Bored Box"; "School Daze / Twinkle Baby Looney Star / Things That Go Bugs in the Night"; "Taz in Toyland / Mary Has a Baby Duck / A Secret Tweet"; "Comfort Level / The Looney Riddle / Like a Duck to Water"	July 15, 2013
Baby Sylvester	"Mr. McStuffles / Twinkle Baby Looney Star / Picture This!"; "Hair Cut-Ups / Does Your Tongue Hang Low / A Clean Sweep"; "Daffy Did It! / Foghorns Talking in the Barnyard / The Pig Who Cried Wolf"; "New Cat in Town / Baby Bunny / Magic of Spring"	July 15, 2013
Baby Tweety	"All Washed Up / My Bunny Lies Over the Ocean / Did Not! Did Too!"; "Tea and Basketball / Down by the Cage / Taz You Like It"; "Band Together / Oh Where, Oh Where Has My Baby Martian Gone / War of the Weirds"; "The Harder They Fall / The Hare Hid Under the Fountain / Business as Unusual"	July 15, 2013
