= In2TV =

2006 American streaming television website

- Website type: Video on demand
- Available in: English
- Founded: March 2006
- Headquarters: United States
- Owners: AOL; Warner Bros. Television
- Website: www.in2tv.com

In2TV was a website offering ad-supported streaming video of classic TV shows in the United States. It was operated by AOL Time Warner as an outlet for the company's archival television programming.

== History ==
In2TV was announced in November 2005 as a collaboration between AOL and Warner Bros. Television, at the time both being owned by the Time Warner conglomerate. The site was created in part as a counteraction against the rapid rise in popularity of video hosting sites such as YouTube; when In2TV launched, Time Warner subsequently ordered all of its content (mostly posted by users, not by Time Warner itself) off YouTube through Digital Millennium Copyright Act (DMCA) notices in order to divert traffic to In2TV. The service was launched with a party held at the Museum of Television & Radio (later renamed as The Paley Center for Media) and on March 15, 2006 and was later integrated with AOL Video in December 2006.

== Content ==
When In2TV first launched the shows were categorized into channels. These included LOL (Comedy), Drama Rama (Drama), What a Rush (Action), Vintage TV (Classic), Heroes Horror (Sci-Fi/Horror), Toon Topia TV (Cartoons) and Pilot Theater (first episodes).

In2TV also included bonus channels featuring original content based on the TV shows featured on the service. These channels included:

- Starplay, featuring stars before they were stars
- Betcha Didn't Know!, trivia about top TV stars
- TV Karaoke, theme-song sing-alongs
- Where Are They Now, updates on stars of past series
- Rock 'n Flix, musical clips from movies

After the move to AOL video in December 2006, the channels were dropped and the shows were put into more generic categories such as Animation, Comedy, Drama, Reality, Sci-Fi, Secret Agent, Urban and en Espanol.

AOL Video lost its rights to the Time Warner library when AOL spun off from Time Warner in 2009 to become an independent company, which was later acquired by Verizon in 2015 and later merged with Yahoo to form Oath (later renamed as the second incarnation of Yahoo Inc.) in 2017. By the time AOL had purchased The Huffington Post (later renamed as HuffPost) in 2011, AOL Video had been dissolved. Links to the service now redirect to Huffington Post's TV section, which contains no archival video. What remains of In2TV's content was moved over to online platforms bearing the brands of the now-defunct The WB and Kids' WB and then to Plex, Warner Bros. Discovery's Max and its FAST channels on The Roku Channel and Tubi (with programming from Discovery's cable channels that added when WarnerMedia and Discovery merged in 2022).
