= Cloud Boy =

Book by Rhode Montijo

- Author: Rhode Montijo
- Cover artist: Rhode Montijo
- Language: English
- Genre: children's literature
- Published: April 11, 2006 Simon & Schuster Children's Publishing (U.S.)
- Publication place: United States
- Media type: Print (Hardback)
- Pages: 32
- ISBN: 978-1-4169-0199-0
- OCLC: 63674433
- Dewey Decimal: [E] 22
- LC Class: PZ7.M76885 Cl 2006

Cloud Boy is a children's picture book written and illustrated by creator Rhode Montijo and published by Simon & Schuster Children's Publishing in 2006.

== Plot ==
A lonely cloud boy lives in the sky. Inspired by a passing butterfly, he shapes a butterfly from a nearby cloud and sets it adrift for others to see. Looking down at the earth, he begins shaping clouds after the things he sees there, such as boats, rabbits, and snowmen. Children on earth enjoy his designs. And Cloud Boy realizes he will not be lonely again as long as there are children who enjoy his creations.

== Reception ==
Reviews of Cloud Boy have been mixed. Kirkus Reviews wrote "comic artist Montijo explores the artistic impulse in a brief episode that’s as insubstantial as the clouds he depicts." and concluded "This debut may have some resonance for older budding artists, but for younger audiences it offers no competition to Charles G. Shaw’s ageless It Looked Like Spilt Milk (1947)." while Publishers Weekly stated "Montijo creates a crisply defined yet soothing visual universe" and "While adults can read the story as an allegory of the artistic ideal, children will appreciate it just for its collection of benevolent floating creations. The hero resembles an airborne cumulus balloon-maker."
