= The Gumazing Gum Girl! =

Children's book series

The Gumazing Gum Girl
- Montijo's "Vintage" poster for the series
- Author: Rhode Montijo; Luke Reynolds
- Language: English; Spanish
- Genre: Children's literature Superhero; Humor; Sequential art
- Publisher: Disney/Hyperion (2013-2020); Little Brown & Company (2020-present)
- Publication date: August 20, 2013-September 7, 2021
- Publication place: United States

The Gumazing Gum Girl! (sometimes referred to simply as Gum Girl!) is an American children's superhero chapter book series by Rhode Montijo and co-authored by Luke Reynolds. It came out on August 20, 2013. The series is inspired by retro-styled superhero comic books and low-budget monster films.

== Premise ==
The series revolved around Gabby Gomez, a Hispanic gum-obsessed elementary school girl who becomes a sticky, stretchy superhero creature, Gum Girl, after accidentally electrocuting herself by blowing a bubble that was way too big. As Gum Girl, Gabby risks her life to fight criminals and save the day with her friends Ravi, Bubble Boy, Ninja-Rina, Robo-Chef and Brainstormer.

== Characters ==
- Gabriella "Gabby" Gomez / Gum Girl - A young girl who loves to chew gum, ignoring the warnings and restrictions of her parents and teachers, and accidentally transforms herself into the sticky, stretchy superhero, Gum Girl. She usually wears a pink dress, a pink bow and black Mary Janes. As Gum Girl, her entire body is made up of chewing gum which gives her extreme “stretchability.”
- Rico Gomez / Bubble Boy - Gabby's brother. He is the fan of Gum Girl and Ninja-Rina. He has ability to blow soap bubbles.
- Natalie Gooch / Brainstormer - A large tomboy, who bullies Gabby, then becomes Gabby's friend. She was a secondary protagonist of the series. She can also be a member of The Cocodrilos. She is shown as a wrestler and a researcher.
- Ninja-Rina - A third protagonist in the series. She is a masked ballerina with mad ninja skills. She knows jujitsu, basket-weaving, and ceramics. She is described as "the quick and graceful as ever."
- Robo-Chef - An arrogant pastry chef and inventor who hates gum. He serves as an anti-hero of the series. He pilots a gigantic one-eyed chef-shaped robot with an eggbeater for his left arm which squirts out peanut cooking oil.
- Mrs. Gomez - Gabby's mother. She restricts Gabby from chewing gum.
- Dr. Gomez - Gabby's father. He is a dentist of his own practice, Gomez Dental.
- Ms. Smoot - Gabby's teacher in Fillmore Elementary School.
- Jeffery Hansen / Hamster Hansen - Gabby's former substitute teacher in Fillmore Elementary School. When Mr. Chubby Cheeks bites him after he gets into the experimental green substance, Mr. Hansen becomes crazy by eating and drinking a lot, and he then transforms into a giant hamster monster. After he drank an antidote, he turns back into a human.
- Ravi Rodriguez - A young boy who became a news reporter.
- Raul Gomez / Sol Azteca - Gabby's uncle, famous luchador, and archaeologist.
- The Everhander / The Underhander - Sol Azteca's old partner and rival. As the Underhander, he threatens to steal the Jade Jaguar.
- Ninja-Rina's mother
- Police Chief Lily Yee
- Miguel, Alma, Lucas, and Litza/Kid Jaguar, Lightning Lobo, Narwhal Nina, and Pink Puma (also known as The Jaguares) - Sol Azteca's students.
- The Cocodrilos - The Everhander's students.
- The Mayor
- The Citizens
- Mr. Chubby Cheeks - Mr. Hansen's pet hamster.
- Ms. Jones - The librarian of Fillmore School.
- Principal Eskenas - The principal of Fillmore School.
- The Escaped Monkeys - The gag characters in the series. There are three monkeys that hold rubber spatulas and being escaped from the zoo after Gum Girl defeats Robo-Chef, starting in "Gum Luck".

== Reception ==
The book series was published to immediate critical mixed-to-acclaim. Some reviewers praised the book series as an exciting way to learn to read in English and in Spanish, particularly compared to the primers that it supplanted. Kirkus Reviews noted the book series' heavy use of humor and sequences. Kirkus wrote, "Perfectly paced and bursting with laughs....". BCCB wrote, "...a welcome addition to the ranks of early-elementary superkids."

== Books ==
The Gumazing Gum Girl! by Rhode Montijo
No.	Title	Date	ISBN
1	Chews Your Destiny (Note: Chews Your Destiny won the Sequoyah Book Award in 2016.)	August 20, 2013	978-142315740-3
Gabby Gomez loves chewing gum so much that she falls asleep chewing it, only to wake up covered in gum. Although her mother bans her from chewing gum, Gabby discovers that if she chews a special kind of gum, blows it up and has it pop all over her, she has super powers.
2	Gum Luck	June 13, 2017 (Note: Gum Luck was originally going to be released in 2014, but due to the production of the animated Halloween Kid special by Sanzigen, it was pushed to June 17, 2017.)	978-142316117-2
Gabby fights with the villain, Robo Chef, who wants to take revenge for the embarrassment that happened to him at a baking event due to gum. Gabby's problem is that her parents said no more to gum, but Gabby just found out that she was Gum Girl.
3	Popped Star	April 3, 2018	978-142316138-7
As Gabby Gomez is trying to tell her family she is Gum Girl, she encounters Ninja-Rina, a masked ballerina for whom no crime is "tutu" big.
4	Cover Blown	October 10, 2019	978-136804817-0
Gum Girl and her family visit Mexico to meet a famous luchador, Sol Azteca.
5	Stick Together!	September 7, 2021 (Note: Stick Together! was originally going to be released in August 17, 2021, but due to a delay in shipping, it was pushed to September 7, 2021.)	978-136805810-0
Gum Girl and her friends go on a mission to fight Mr. Hansen, who was now a giant hamster monster.

== Book Packs ==
=== The Gumazing Gum Girl Pack! (2019) ===
==== Books Including ====
- Chews Your Destiny
- Gum Luck
- Popped Star

== Animated series adaptation ==
On May 27, 2021, voice actress Nancy Cartwright revealed that DreamWorks Animation Television and her production company CRE84U were developing an animated series adapted from the book series.
