= Baby Looney Tunes' Eggs-traordinary Adventure =

- Directed by: Gloria Yuh Jenkins
- Based on: Looney Tunes by Warner Bros.
- Produced by: Gloria Yuh Jenkins; Tom Minton
- Starring: June Foray; Ian James Corlett; Terry Klassen; Britt McKillip; Sam Vincent
- Edited by: Rob DeSales; Derrick Mitchell
- Music by: Julie Bernstein; Steven Bernstein
- Production company: Warner Bros. Animation
- Distributed by: Warner Home Video
- Release date: February 11, 2003
- Running time: 60 minutes
- Country: United States
- Language: English

Baby Looney Tunes' Eggs-traordinary Adventure is a 2003 American animated comedy film from Warner Bros. Animation. It is a special based on the television series Baby Looney Tunes. The special follows the main characters from Baby Looney Tunes as they go on a search for the true meaning of Easter.

The producers were Gloria Yuh Jenkins and Tom Minton, both of whom had worked on the television series. Korean studio Dong Woo Animation provided the animation. Eggs-traordinary Adventure was released on both VHS and DVD on February 11, 2003 and on Boomerang in March 2017.

== Plot ==
After Granny reads a story about Easter and the Easter Bunny, the babies become excited about it. Taz is most excited about this, but Granny tells him that Easter isn't until one more day, upsetting him. Daffy does not believe in any of this stuff and tries to convince everyone that there is no such thing as the Easter Bunny. Later on, Lola and Tweety throw an Easter party for Taz and invite Bugs. However, Daffy tries to convince Bugs that there is still no Easter Bunny and tells him to forget about it. Bugs angrily agrees and tears the decorations down, upsetting Lola and Tweety.

During nap time, Tweety and Lola suggest to Sylvester that they should take Taz to the forest by following the pages in Granny’s book. However, Daffy is shocked to find them gone and he and Bugs go out to find them. Bugs, wearing a blue raincoat and boots and Daffy, covered in yellow paint and with leaves around his waist, paint rocks to look like Easter eggs. While finding the rocks, Taz falls into the river and is rescued by Bugs and Daffy. However, the "eggs" turn out to be rocks and the yellow paint washes off Daffy in the river. They all finally realize that there is no Easter Bunny until the next morning, when they wake up to find real Easter eggs, delighting Taz. Sylvester is given a chocolate chicken, which means the Easter Bunny did come and it turns out to be a happy Easter after all.

== Voice cast ==
- June Foray as Granny
- Sam Vincent as Baby Bugs, Baby Daffy, and Baby Tweety
- Ian James Corlett as Baby Taz
- Terry Klassen as Baby Sylvester
- Britt McKillip as Baby Lola

== See also ==
- List of Easter films
- List of Easter television episodes
