= Littlest Pet Shop (disambiguation) =

Littlest Pet Shop is a Hasbro toy franchise. It may also refer to:

- Littlest Pet Shop (1995 TV series)
- Littlest Pet Shop (2012 TV series)
- Littlest Pet Shop (video game)
- Littlest Pet Shop: A World of Our Own
