= Lili Beaudoin =

Canadian actress

- Born: Canada
- Occupation: Actor
- Partner: Ryan Beil

Lili Beaudoin is a Canadian actress. She won a Betty Mitchell award for Outstanding Performance by an Actress in a Drama in 2017.

She voices Crick from Beat Bugs, Plaid Stripes and Kettle Corn from My Little Pony: Friendship Is Magic, Rayne Martinez/Tempestra from Max Steel, and Edie Von Keet from the 2018 Littlest Pet Shop series Littlest Pet Shop: A World of Our Own.

Beaudoin has voiced Finni and Melsa in Dragalia Lost from the latter's first appearance in October/November 2018 up to the character's special second anniversary voiced message in September 2020. However, an alternate version of Melsa released as a Halloween variant in October 2020 is voiced by Anne Solange.

She is also the voice of Merle and Marin in the English dub of the 2020 Dragon Quest: The Adventure of Dai anime.

Beaudoin is also the voice of Kiwi Lollipop in the 2019 My Little Pony: Equestria Girls special Sunset's Backstage Pass.

Most recently, she is the voice of Lana in the new English dub of Hayao Miyazaki's Future Boy Conan.

== Filmography ==
=== Video games ===
List of voice performances in video games
Year	Title	Role	Notes	Source
2023	Granblue Fantasy Versus: Rising	Pecorine		
