= List of Littlest Pet Shop (2012 TV series) characters =

Promotional image showing some of the main characters; from left to right: Russell, Blythe, Sunil, Pepper, Zoe, Penny Ling, Minka and Vinnie.

Littlest Pet Shop is a children's animated television series developed by Tim and Julie McNally-Cahill. The series is based on Hasbro's Littlest Pet Shop toy line, and features Blythe Baxter (voiced by Ashleigh Ball, with the character based on the doll of the same name) as the main protagonist, as well as other characters who reside in Downtown City (a city modeled after New York City). Along with Blythe is her father, Roger Baxter (voiced by Michael Kopsa), and her employer Mrs. Anna Twombly (voiced by Kathleen Barr) at the nearby pet store, Littlest Pet Shop. Away from home, she maintains several friends at her local high school. As well as the human cast are her seven animal companions, who reside within Littlest Pet Shop during the day, that whom Blythe unexpectedly gains the ability to communicate.

Character	Voiced by
Blythe Baxter	Ashleigh Ball
Russell Ferguson	Sam Vincent
Sunil Nevla	Peter New
Vinnie Terrio	Kyle Rideout
Pepper Clark	Tabitha St. Germain
Minka Mark	Kira Tozer
Zoe Trent	Nicole Oliver
Zoe Trent	Kylee Epp (singing voice)
Penny Ling	Jocelyne Loewen
Penny Ling	Laura Hastings (singing voice)

== Protagonists ==
- Blythe Baxter (voiced by Ashleigh Ball) is the main character of the series, an aspiring fashion artist and designer. She is very kind and compassionate and always assists others in need, including the pets, Mrs. Twombly, her new friends, Youngmee, Sue and Jasper,micheal kopsa voice roger pass away and even Whittany and Brittany Biskit. She has dark brown hair and light blue eyes, but she also wears "fashionable and unique" outfits. Blythe, along with her father, Roger Baxter, moved to an apartment in Downtown City above a pet store called the Littlest Pet Shop. Soon after moving into the building, Blythe hits her head and discovers that she can now be able to talk and understand animals. She comes to enjoy working at the Littlest Pet Shop not long after she saves the store from going out of business. Though she has wanted to be on TV all her life, she is also extremely camera-shy. Blythe is also a little closer to Russell, her best friend. Blythe's mother was Lauren Smith (nicknamed "Betty") before adopting the surname Baxter upon marrying Roger, and Lauren's former pet tortoise Speedy Shellberg claims that Betty also may have talked to animals, a fact that was confirmed by her father in the series finale. Throughout the series, several jokes were made about the expanse of the size of Blythe's head.
- Russell Ferguson (voiced by Sam Vincent) is a male orange European hedgehog with yellow-green eyes. He is the organizer of the group with a love of food. Though uptight, he maintains everyone in the shop, making sure everything's orderly. Though Russell heavily wishes to fit in more with his friends, unfortunately, his love for safety and maintenance and his friendship with six friends often spoils the other pets' enjoyment, which causes them to poke fun at him. In the episode "Penny for Your Laughs," it's revealed that he has an abnormal fear of marshmallows. He also has a fear of ghosts. He is considered Blythe's best friend; the show's running gag is that he is often mistaken for a porcupine.
- Sunil Nevla (voiced by Peter New) is a male blue banded mongoose with golden eyes and an Indian accent, who is Vinnie's best friend. He is very timid and fearful, but when faced with adventure, he will (though reluctantly) gather courage and bravery for his friends. He is a magician who enjoys performing various magic tricks on his friends at the shop, but they mostly fail or rarely work when he needs to. Despite his timid appearance and personality, Sunil becomes aggressive at the thought of cobras (an allusion to mongooses' natural prey).Sunil is known to have entomophobia, causing him to panic every time he sees bugs, arachnids, and centipedes. (Note: Usually addressed by their names or with their surnames, their middle names were revealed in "Frenemies".)
- Vincent Alfonso "Vinnie" Terrio (voiced by Kyle Rideout) is a male green gecko with purple eyes who is Sunil's best friend. Though slow at times, he is a talented dancer but is unfortunately prone to wreaking havoc for others in the pet shop because of his natural clumsiness. In "Frenemies", he finds out he is a better dancer without his tail. His favorite series is Shake a Leg, a dance competition show.
- Pepper Mildred Clark (voiced by Tabitha St. Germain) is a female gray and white striped skunk with light pink eyes and a thick Boston accent. As a self-proclaimed comedian, she loves amusing her friends, usually through the use of puns and comical props. At times, however, she can be brash and inconsiderate towards others. Unlike natural skunks in the real world, Pepper's smell changes depending on her mood, fragrant when pleasant, and foul when terrible.
- Minka Mark (voiced by Kira Tozer) is a female pink spider monkey with light blue eyes, who is an artist. Energetic, flexible, and hyper, she is an expert in abstract art. However, she is constantly distracted by shiny objects, hanging out on the tire swing, or looking for something to eat. In the episode "Dumb Dumbwaiter" it is revealed that she is heavily claustrophobic. She often sits and rocks herself back and forth quietly saying to herself: "space monkey, I'm a space monkey...", when in a small space and unable to escape.
- Zoe Trent (speaking voice by Nicole Oliver and singing voice by Kylee Epp) is a female purple Cavalier King Charles Spaniel with light blue eyes, who is a singer. A born diva, she strives to achieve her goal of being the greatest entertainer, though she can sometimes be quite dramatic and snobbish, and a little rude towards others, but she cares for everyone very much and is very willing to go out of her comfort zone to be there for them. Her owners are the couple John (voiced by Peter New) and Clarissa Trent (voiced by Tabitha St. Germain). Zoe is the younger sister of Eli Trent and the older cousin of Gail Trent. In "Trading Places", it is revealed she has a crush on a dog named Digby and once fell in love with a street mime in Paris named Philippe.
- Penny Ling (speaking voice by Jocelyne Loewen and singing voice Laura Hastings) is a female white and indigo giant panda with greyish purple eyes, who is a rhythmic gymnast with a talent for twirling ribbons. Despite being the peacekeeper of the group, her feelings are most sensitive and she is prone to get hurt by others, though when the job comes down to it, Penny Ling can be straightforward, and there are some times that she can be grumpy.
- Roger Baxter (voiced by Michael Kopsa) is Blythe's fun-loving, slightly clumsy father whose promotion to the rank of Captain in his airline takes them from their quiet hometown to Downtown City where countless adventures await. He has dark brown with some gray hair and blue eyes. Roger loves spending time with Blythe, listening to heavy metal, and supporting any of Blythe's talents and endeavors. (Note: Usually referred to as Mrs. Twombly, her first name was revealed to be 'Anna' in "Lotsa Luck".)
- Mrs. Twombly (voiced by Kathleen Barr) is the kind, off-beat owner of the Littlest Pet Shop pet store and day camp for pets. She has silver hair and turquoise eyes. Mrs. Twombly befriends Blythe and helps her to display and sell her first pet fashion collection. She has a love for animals and making them feel at home in Littlest Pet Shop. She also has a bizarre obsession for collecting doorknobs, occasionally compulsive cleaning, and some unique talents from her past, including inventing the martial art of kung-fu quilting.

== Animals ==
- Buttercream Sundae (voiced by Cathy Weseluck) is a female yellow and brown Netherland Dwarf rabbit with dark green eyes, who is a dancer. A later addition to the group, Buttercream's owner is Youngmee Song's Aunt Christie, who owns the candy shop named Sweet Delights. She is very active and hyper, but also very mischievous: the other running gag is that she has a habit of saying overly sweet, hyper, and nonsensical statements (possibly from constant sugar hypes) and whenever she does, one of the pets will say catchphrase "What?" to her. Buttercream calmly responds with another "What?", twirls her ears with a twanging sound, and then relaxes before saying "Anywho." She shows up occasionally throughout the series.
- Cairo Autumn (voiced by Tabitha St. Germain) is a sphynx cat with blue eyes, owned by Mona Autumn. She gives Blythe advice on how to deal with Mona and helps her gain Mona's approval.
- Cashmere and Velvet (both voiced by Nicole Oliver) are two chinchillas who almost resemble the Biskit Twins. The Biskits planned to keep them only for one day for the school's Pet Appreciation day and then ditch them at an animal shelter, but Blythe, Penny Ling, and Vinnie are determined to get the Biskits to keep them as real pets. They make a cameo appearance in "Fish Out of Water". Cashmere has a black hair and tail and Velvet has her hair and tail white.
- Delilah Barnsley (voiced by Tabitha St. Germain) is a cat from England with a British accent. She speaks in riddles that can be difficult to understand. Sunil falls in love with her (she seems to be aware of this and humors him by flirting occasionally). Her associates are Milah, Shilah, and Twylah. Delilah reappears in the season four episode "Pitch Purrfect".
- Digby (voiced by Peter New) is a light brown dog with light blue eyes that first appears in the episode "Trading Places", in which, it's revealed Zoe has a crush on him, has difficulty speaking to him directly and, fortunately, returns her affections. He is also friendly with Penny Ling.
- Doctor Handsomeface (voiced by Terry Klassen) is a German Shepherd who appears in "Un-vetted".
- Felina Meow (voiced by Casey Wilson) is a cat who is a viral video star.
- Fuzzy Gumbopaws (voiced by Brian Drummond) is a cat that makes his first appearance in "Steamed".
- Madame Pom (voiced by Kathleen Barr) is a female Pomeranian with blue eyes. Snobby and narcissistic, she won a dog modeling show against Zoe, starting a rivalry between the two. When she and Zoe confront each other again in the episode "Eve of Destruction", their rivalry sparks up again and they try to use their fashion to determine who is the better model. However, they end up becoming friends in the process. She reappears in the season two episode, "To Paris With Zoe", trying to help Zoe focus on the competition.
- Parker Waddleton (voiced by Tabitha St. Germain) is an emperor penguin who's black with a white face, a white belly, an orange beak, and orange feet.
- Sunshine Sweetness (voiced by Kathleen Barr) is a western lowland gorilla who knows Tess McSavage. Tess has a misunderstanding of her squeaky panda which explains why Tess has a phobia of pandas and gorillas. In the end, Tess finds Sunshine's squeaky and faces her fears of pandas and gorillas.

=== Nevla family ===
They appear first in imagination in the episode "Frenemies". They later appeared in the episode "Bake Boss". They want their son to be a doctor, but on their final appearance, they want him to be a filmmaker.

- Sunil's Dad (voiced by Sam Vincent) is a teal mongoose with emerald green eyes, a turquoise face, and a turquoise belly, the tip of his tail is of the same color. In addition to the back stripes he shares with his son, he has stripes on his tail.
- Sunil's Mom (voiced by Tabitha St. Germain) is a blue mongoose with light blue hair and brown eyes. Unlike her son, she does not have stripes on her back. She wears earrings, a bracelet, and a red bindi on her forehead.
- Nutmeg Dash (voiced by Tabitha St. Germain) is an English Cocker Spaniel that first appeared in "Petnapped!" She belonged to a billionaire named William Stacie, who died; later on, he left on his last will that Nutmeg would decide who her next owner will be: she is now Youngmee's pet. Her full name is Nutasha Margareta Dashiniola.
- Old Bananas (also known as O.B.) (voiced by Sam Vincent) is a famous orangutan who is a comedian. Pepper is a big fan of his, but despite being a comedian, he originally is a grumpy ape and doesn't seem to be impressed due to Pepper's lack of comedian skills.
- Peachy Fluffton (voiced by Brooke Goldner) is an optimistic quokka who sends Sunil on a quest to find happiness in Downtown City.
- Shivers (voiced by Brian Drummond) is a red squirrel with blue-green eyes who appears in "Blythe's Pet Project". He has a problem with stealing, or rather hoarding, things that aren't his. But in the end, he became a good guy and has Pepper as one of his best friends. Shivers reappears in the season four episode "Game of Groans".
- Speedy Shellberg (voiced by Sam Vincent) is a tortoise who is 150 years old and at one time, was owned by Blythe's mother.
- Sugar Sprinkles (voiced by Kelly Metzger) is a female tan-colored snowshoe cat with blue eyes. She tends to burst out into singing while playing with her ukulele. In the episode "Sweet (Truck) Ride", she sang "Sprinkles on my Head". She is calm and kind with an apologetic demeanor (she likes ribbons). In her first appearance in "Sweet (Truck) Ride", she appears as part of a fantasy sequence paying homage to Star Trek is a green uniform. She is the only non-main character (apart from Blythe and her pets) to appear as both TV and game counterparts; she shows up occasionally throughout the series.
- Wiggles McSunbask (voiced by Colin Murdock) is an American alligator with green eyes. He bullied the Littlest Pet Shop pets, driving them to take a stand without Blythe's help. He later reveals that he only did it because of his appearance, saying that: "he might have acted mean to those who get in his way".
- Pancakes Watkins (voiced by Shannon Chan-Kent)
- Gail Trent (voiced by Tabitha St. Germain) is a female pink Cavalier King Charles Spaniel and the younger paternal cousin of Zoe and Eli Trent who only appeared in near the end of Gailbreak! She is a light pink version of her older cousins but without the black hat.
- Eli Trent ( voiced by ??? ) is the older brother of Zoe who does not appear in the show. He is a male Cavalier King Charles Spaniel and an older cousin of Gail Trent.

== Humans ==
- Alice (voiced by Ashleigh Ball) is a little girl and a minor antagonist who lives with her mother across the Littlest Pet Shop.
- Christie (voiced by Kira Tozer) is Youngmee's workaholic aunt with a caring disposition and a talent for making confectioneries. She is of Korean descent and has jet black hair and dark violet eyes like her niece. Christie owns a bakery and sweets shop, Sweet Delights, and the pet's new rabbit friend, Buttercream.
- Eliza Biskit (voiced by Shannon Chan-Kent) is the Biskit twins' mother. She is extremely cheerful and bubbly, but rather inept at raising her daughters, diverting most of her attention to her pet dog, Poppy Pawsley. She is shown to have a habit of breaking into songs at random moments.
- Emma Hart (voiced by Brooke Goldner) is the teenage daughter of Roger's co-pilot Steph for the pet jet. She is an aspiring tour guide and often takes Blythe sightseeing when they land in various countries they visit (usually against Blythe's will) as an opportunity to follow her career. Her voice actress, Brooke Goldner, voiced Rebound from the Hub's series, Pound Puppies. She appears throughout season 2 when Blythe goes to other countries.
- Fisher Biskit (voiced by Samuel Vincent) is the Biskit twins' wealthy, business-minded father. Though Mr. Biskit has spoiled his daughters, Whittany and Brittany, he has no qualms about putting his foot down when he expects them to carry out a task that he has given them. He has white hair and light gray-blue eyes.
- Francois LeGrande (voiced by Peter New) is the butler of the Biskits who often talks. He helps the Biskit twins with some of their devious plots. In the episode "The Pet Fest, Part 2", he is fired by the Biskit twins but is later re-hired by their father and so it's revealed he has a family that farms chinchillas.
- Jasper Jones (voiced by Kathleen Barr) is Blythe's helpful, supportive, and sometimes sarcastic friend. He is of African descent and has hazel eyes. Jasper has many hobbies and talents, such as photography, movie editing, and being able to paint detailed world landmarks like the Taj Mahal on grains of rice.
- Josh Sharp (voiced by Samuel Vincent) first appears in "Blythe's Crush", and is secretly Blythe's boyfriend. Josh makes a second appearance in "Helicopter Dad" and has made various other appearances since.
- Lauren Smith is the birth name of Blythe's absent mother, seen in flashbacks. She is the former owner of Speedy Shellberg and acquired the nickname "Betty" through unknown means. "Betty" Smith met and married Roger Baxter, and also gave birth to Blythe, in an unknown order. Although Blythe inquires about "Betty" Baxter, it is unclear if Lauren Baxter was still known by her childhood nickname after marriage. Until her father's clarification in the season 4 premiere, Blythe's questions indicate she did not know her mother's forename or surname.
- Madison (voiced by Shannon Chan-Kent) is a girl in braces, who has a "not-too-bright" expression. She subbed in for Blythe at the pet shop when Blythe was not there. She now works at the Pawza Hotel. She wears a face mask when near pets.
- McKenna Nicole (voiced by Tabitha St. Germain) is a girl who loves fashion. She attended Fashion University North during the summer, staying in the "Sew-What" student dorm with Blythe.
- Mona Autumn (voiced by Tabitha St. Germain) is the owner of the famous fashion bag magazine Tres Blasé. She is known to crush inspired fashionistas from even starting in fashion or give them a bright future. She is very nice and acts tough so she will rule out any copycats, suck-ups and so on.
- Ramon (voiced by Colin Murdock) is a devious Spanish costume designer who becomes an adversary for Blythe since he plundered her designs for a parade, but was caught. He appears in 'Plane it on Rio', where he repeats his crime to cheat in the Rio carnival show to cheat, but was again defeated.
- The Soul Patches is Youngmee's favorite band, which has five members:
  - In his debut episode, Dustin and the rest of the Soul Patches performs at the Biskit's party.
  - In his debut episode, Hayden and the rest of the Soul Patches, perform at the Biskit's party.
  - Jason 1 (speaking voice by Peter New and singing voiced by Dan Sioui) is the lead singer for the Soul Patches who first appeared in "If the Shoe Fits".
  - Jason 2 is a guitar player for the Soul Patches. He owns a pet named Pick Shellville. Jason 2 first appeared in "If the Shoe Fits".
  - Ted is a guitar player for the Soul Patches. He owns a pet named Strum Basso. Ted first appeared in "If the Shoe Fits".
- Sue Patterson (voiced by Kira Tozer) has orange hair and light blue eyes. She enjoys athletics and tries to get Blythe to expand her athletic abilities by pushing her to try harder to do things, such as (what turns into a failed attempt at) roller skating. Though she is confident in her abilities in sports, Sue is sometimes insecure about her fashion and creativity in comparison to Blythe.
- Stephanie Hart (voiced by Tabitha St. Germain) is Roger Baxter's co-pilot and Emma's mother: the nickname, Steph, is short for Stephanie.
- The Biskit Twins, Brittney and Whittney Biskit (both voiced by Shannon Chan-Kent) are the main antagonists of the show. They are bullies and all-around rich mean girls who seem to envy Blythe. Although they aren't the smartest, this duo is not opposed to using whatever evil scheme they can come up with (and "Daddy's" money) to sabotage Blythe and her friends' endeavors. Brittney and Whittney Biskit's father is the owner of Largest Ever Pet Shop, the unfriendly competitor of Littlest Pet Shop. The twins have red eyes: Brittney Biskit is bleached white and Whittney Biskit has black hair. They don't have pets at all due to the stuff they did in 2 pets for 2 pests in the beginning.
- Youngmee Song (voiced by Shannon Chan-Kent) is Blythe's kind, empathetic (sometimes spacey), new other best friend, whose Aunt Christie owns a neighboring sweets shop and, Buttercream, the rabbit. She is of Korean descent and has jet black hair and dark violet eyes. She is well known for being intelligent. Youngmee soon becomes the only one of Blythe's friends who learn Blythe's secret. As of season 4, Youngmee gains a pet in Nutasha Margareta "Nutmeg Dash" Dashiniola (voiced by Tabitha St. Germain), an English Cocker Spaniel who previously belonged to a billionaire named William Stacie (who died recently and later on).
