= List of Littlest Pet Shop episodes =

Littlest Pet Shop is a 2012 animated television series developed by Tim Cahill and Julie McNally-Cahill. The series is based on Hasbro's Littlest Pet Shop toy line, and features Blythe Baxter (voiced by Ashleigh Ball, with the character based on the doll of the same name) as the main protagonist, as well as other characters who reside in Downtown City, a city modeled after New York City. Along with Blythe is her father, Roger Baxter (voiced by Michael Kopsa), and her employer Mrs. Anna Twombly (voiced by Kathleen Barr) at the nearby pet store, Littlest Pet Shop. Away from home, she maintains several friends at her local high school. As well as the human cast are her seven animal companions, who reside within Littlest Pet Shop during the day, that Blythe unexpectedly gains the ability to communicate with.

The series is produced by Hasbro Studios in the United States and animated by DHX Media's animation studio in Vancouver, British Columbia, Canada. The series is directed by Dallas Parker and Joel Dickie. The series was commissioned by Hasbro Studios in 2011. During production, Blythe Loves the Littlest Pet Shop was used as the working title of the series. The series premiere on Saturday, November 10, 2012 in the United States on Hub Network was reported to have been the highest watched of all original series premieres on the Hub Network.

On March 31, 2015, it was announced that the series had been renewed for a 26-episode fourth season, but on October 6, 2015, it was confirmed by story editor Roger Eschbacher that the fourth season was going to be the final season. The fourth season aired from November 7, 2015 to June 4, 2016.

== Series overview ==
| Season | Episodes | | Originally released | | |
| Season | Episodes | | First released | Last released | Network |
|---|---|---|---|---|---|
| 1 | 26 | | November 10, 2012 | April 27, 2013 | The Hub/Hub Network |
| 2 | 26 | | November 2, 2013 | April 12, 2014 | The Hub/Hub Network |
| 3 | 26 | 13 | May 31, 2014 | August 23, 2014 | The Hub/Hub Network |
| 3 | 26 | 13 | December 13, 2014 | March 7, 2015 | Discovery Family |
| 4 | 26 | | November 7, 2015 | June 4, 2016 | Discovery Family |

== Episodes ==
=== Season 1 (2012–13) ===
| No. overall | No. in season | Title | Directed by | Written by | Original release date | U.S. viewers (in millions) |
|---|---|---|---|---|---|---|
| 1 | 1 | "Blythe's Big Adventure" | Joel Dickie; Dallas Parker (supervising) | Julie McNally Cahill & Tim Cahill | November 10, 2012 | 0.54 |
| 2 | 2 | "Blythe's Big Adventure" | Joel Dickie; Dallas Parker (supervising) | Julie McNally Cahill & Tim Cahill | November 10, 2012 | 0.50 |
After moving into an apartment in Downtown City, Blythe Baxter, a young girl, gains the ability to communicate with animals after falling in a dumbwaiter. There, she meets a group of pets who reside in a day camp area of a pet shop located below her new apartment, who enlist her help when the store is on the verge of running out of business. Blythe decides to help the pets save the pet shop from closing down. Song: "The Littlest Pet Shop Pets" sung by Zoe and the pets Note: This two-part episode marks the series premiere.
| 3 | 3 | "Bad Hair Day" | Joel Dickie; Dallas Parker (supervising) | Roger Eschbacher | November 17, 2012 | 0.45 |
Blythe stumbles to fix a botched haircut on Zoe, while the other pets urge Minka to pursue the life of an art superstar, and things get out of hand when they overestimate her artistic endurance.
| 4 | 4 | "Gailbreak!" | Joel Dickie; Dallas Parker (supervising) | Mitchell Larson | November 24, 2012 | 0.30 |
Blythe uses the pets as diversions in order to rescue Zoe's sister from inside Largest Ever Pet Shop, an expansive pet store retail chain owned by the Biskit twins' father, Fisher Biskit. Song: "Dance Like You Know You Can" sung by Zoe
| 5 | 5 | "Penny For Your Laughs" | Joel Dickie; Dallas Parker (supervising) | Story by : Julie McNally Cahill & Tim Cahill and Evan Gore & Heather Lombard; Teleplay by : Evan Gore & Heather Lombard | December 1, 2012 | 0.34 |
Blythe earns the gratitude of the Biskit twins after defending them against a bully during gym, but ends up being forced from talking to her other friends. Meanwhile, Pepper is inspired to use insult comedy as part of her stand-up comedy schtick, but takes it too far on Penny while being unaware of her sensitive feelings. Songs: "BFF's" sung by Biskit Twins and Blythe and "I'm Sorry Song" sung by Pepper
| 6 | 6 | "Mean Isn't Your Color" | Joel Dickie; Dallas Parker (supervising) | Story by : Mitch Larson and Corey Powell; Teleplay by : Corey Powell | December 8, 2012 | 0.27 |
Blythe rejects the notion of her dad going on a date to a charity ball, while Penny Ling struggles to voice her disapproval of an outfit Blythe designs for her to wear at the ball along with the rest of the pets.
| 7 | 7 | "Russell Up Some Fun" | Joel Dickie; Dallas Parker (supervising) | Story by : Julie McNally Cahill & Tim Cahill and Cindy Banks Morrow; Teleplay by : Cindy Banks Morrow | December 15, 2012 | 0.41 |
Suspecting that he has become too serious for his own good, Russell loosens up by creating an alter ego, dubbed "Fun Russell". Meanwhile, Blythe finds her friend Sue mimicking every aspect of her personality unsettling. Songs: "Fun Being Fun" sung by Russell and "Be Yourself" sung by Blythe and Sue
| 8 | 8 | "Blythe's Crush" | Joel Dickie; Dallas Parker (supervising) | Story by : Julie McNally Cahill & Tim Cahill and Merriwether Williams; Teleplay by : Merriwether Williams | December 22, 2012 | 0.25 |
Blythe stumbles upon some keys belonging to her crush, Josh Sharp, and goes searching for him using Sunil's precognition. When Sunil assumes Blythe has gotten lost due to his own lack of faith in his psychic abilities, he enlists the help of his friends, along with larger-than-life parrot Esteban Banderas. Song: "Crush" sung by Zoe
| 9 | 9 | "Dumb Dumbwaiter" | Joel Dickie; Dallas Parker (supervising) | Story by : Mitchell Larson and Roger Eschbacher; Teleplay by : Roger Eschbacher | December 29, 2012 | 0.45 |
While on her way to meet with her friends at a flash mob, Blythe gets trapped in the dumbwaiter along with Zoe, Pepper and Minka. While Penny Ling tries to attract the attention of the boys to get them out from the dumbwaiter, Zoe and Pepper start to fight, and within their compact space, Minka's claustrophobia is triggered. Song: "If You're a Guy" sung by Vinnie, Sunil and Russell
| 10 | 10 | "Eve of Destruction" | Joel Dickie; Dallas Parker (supervising) | Story by : Julie McNally Cahill & Tim Cahill and Evan Gore & Heather Lombard; Teleplay by : Evan Gore & Heather Lombard | January 5, 2013 | 0.34 |
Blythe attempts to be the peacekeeper between Zoe and her old rival Madame Pom when she arrives at day camp, all the while Penny Ling and Vinnie nearly destroy the shop while practicing for their new group dance routine. Likewise, Mrs. Twombly goes on a rampage in search of her favorite cleaning spray.
| 11 | 11 | "Books and Covers" | Joel Dickie; Dallas Parker (supervising) | Story by : Julie McNally Cahill & Tim Cahill and Adam Beechen; Teleplay by : Adam Beechen | January 12, 2013 | 0.26 |
The pets suspect a Siamese cat visiting the day camp is preying on Mrs. Twombly. Meanwhile, Blythe encourages the Biskit twins to join their mathlete team after she overhears them using narratives of their daily life to solve complex math equations.
| 12 | 12 | "So You Skink You Can Dance" | Joel Dickie; Dallas Parker (supervising) | Mitchell Larson | January 19, 2013 | 0.33 |
Vinnie gets to tour the set of his favorite dance competition show, Shake a Leg. When his dance performance in front of the show's judges gets harshly rejected, he tearfully abandons Blythe into the streets, where he befriends an ensemble of street-dancing lizards. Meanwhile, the pets stumble around trying to find a decent spot for their remote control. Song: "Gotta Get To The Studio" sung by Vinnie
| 13 | 13 | "Lights, Camera, Mongoose!" | Joel Dickie; Dallas Parker (supervising) | Corey Powell | January 26, 2013 | 0.25 |
Sunil is mistaken for Shahrukh, a famous movie mongoose hailing from India. The pets bend over backwards to appease him, but quickly lose their patience at his pampered behavior during his stay at the day camp. Song: "Superstar Life" sung by Shahrukh
| 14 | 14 | "Trading Places" | Joel Dickie; Dallas Parker (supervising) | Story by : Julie McNally Cahill & Tim Cahill and Tom Minton; Teleplay by : Tom Minton | February 2, 2013 | 0.38 |
Zoe, temporarily bandaged due to an embarrassing pimple on her nose, asks Penny Ling to pass along her romantic feelings to her crush, Digby, during his stay at the day camp. Meanwhile, Russell hides in Blythe's backpack, wanting to pursue an education, but gets lost within the corridors of her high school.
| 15 | 15 | "Topped With Buttercream" | Joel Dickie; Dallas Parker (supervising) | Story by : Julie McNally Cahill & Tim Cahill and Roger Eschbacher; Teleplay by : Roger Eschbacher | February 9, 2013 | 0.36 |
Youngmee's Aunt Christie opens a confectionery store adjacent to Littlest Pet Shop, and the pets meet pet Buttercream Sunday, a hyperactive rabbit, who invites them to overindulge themselves on the sugar-filled treats located in Christie's pantry. Song: "The Sweet Shop Song" sung by Buttercream and the pets
| 16 | 16 | "Sweet (Truck) Ride" | Joel Dickie; Dallas Parker (supervising) | Story by : Julie McNally Cahill & Tim Cahill and Guy Toubes; Teleplay by : Guy Toubes | February 16, 2013 | 0.40 |
Surrounded by guilt, the pets try to prove Blythe's innocence after she is accused of sending Aunt Cristie's truck careening down the street while meeting Buttercream's alley cat friend, Sugar Sprinkles.
| 17 | 17 | "Helicopter Dad" | Joel Dickie; Dallas Parker (supervising) | Evan Gore & Heather Lombard | February 23, 2013 | 0.28 |
Minka tries to befriend an antisocial tortoise named Olive Shellstein, who is dropped off at the day camp, but stumbles to get her out of her shell before she has to leave. Meanwhile, Roger surprises Blythe at her high school, wishing to spend the day together.
| 18 | 18 | "What's in the Batter?" | Joel Dickie; Dallas Parker (supervising) | Merriwether Williams | March 2, 2013 | 0.28 |
Blythe enlists the pets to retrieve her new favorite necklace that fell inside a vat of batter used for filling a huge cupcake order with Youngmee. This proves difficult for them, when they discover the order was placed by Fisher Biskit for his twin daughter's "quarter-birthday" party.
| 19 | 19 | "What Did You Say?" | Joel Dickie; Dallas Parker (supervising) | Story by : Julie McNally Cahill & Tim Cahill and Roger Eschbacher; Teleplay by : Roger Eschbacher | March 9, 2013 | 0.21 |
Vinnie accidentally falls into a dumpster while trying to catch a fly and is transported to the dump, where he encounters a rat that helps him get back to the pet store. Blythe contracts the common cold and can no longer understand the pets, so the pets try to cure her. Song: "Humanarian" sung by the girls and Sunil
| 20 | 20 | "Bakers and Fakers" | Joel Dickie; Dallas Parker (supervising) | Story by : Julie McNally Cahill & Tim Cahill and Adam Beechen; Teleplay by : Adam Beechen | March 16, 2013 | 0.29 |
Russell, Zoe, and Vinnie, along with Buttercream, try to retrieve a recipe stolen from Blythe by the Biskits, who plan to use it for a baking competition hosted at Blythe's school. All the while, Vinnie has a vision of cakes occupying the world.
| 21 | 21 | "Terriers and Tiaras" | Joel Dickie; Dallas Parker (supervising) | Story by : Julie McNally Cahill & Tim Cahill and Mitch Larson; Teleplay by : Mitch Larson | March 23, 2013 | 0.37 |
Zoe begs for Blythe to enter her in a reality television series based on a beauty pageant for dogs. What starts off as enjoyable starts to consume Blythe, who becomes driven by winning the pageant, much to the dejection of Zoe.
| 22 | 22 | "Lotsa Luck" | Joel Dickie; Dallas Parker (supervising) | Tom Minton | March 30, 2013 | 0.25 |
Blythe discovers Mrs. Twombly's past as the inventor of a unique martial art. Meanwhile, a Bornean orangutan called Old Bananas (Pepper's favorite comedy idol) comes to visit the day camp, but finds herself struggling to amuse him with her jokes, in order to earn his signature thumbs-up of approval. Song: "Miss Anna T, If You Please" sung by Chorus
| 23 | 23 | "Door-Jammed" | Joel Dickie; Dallas Parker (supervising) | Story by : Julie McNally Cahill & Tim Cahill and Corey Powell; Teleplay by : Corey Powell | April 6, 2013 | 0.36 |
Sunil and Vinnie hear howling noises coming from inside the pet shop, and suspect that their friends have turned into werewolves. When Mrs. Twombly finds she has been outbid at an online auction for a highly coveted doorknob by her rival, Fisher Biskit, she takes Blythe and herself for a visit to his mansion to find its whereabouts. Song: "Wolf-i-fied" sung by Sunil and Vinnie
| 24 | 24 | "Frenemies" | Joel Dickie; Dallas Parker (supervising) | Story by : Julie McNally Cahill & Tim Cahill and Guy Toubes; Teleplay by : Guy Toubes | April 13, 2013 | 0.28 |
Vinnie's tail falls off in an act of autotomy, and after a series of trials to find an adequate replacement for it, he is shocked to find that he becomes better at dancing without one. Meanwhile, Zoe and Pepper become rivals over the theme for a party meant for Penny Ling. Song: "My New Tail" sung by Vinnie
| 25 | 25 | "Blythe's Pet Project" | Joel Dickie; Dallas Parker (supervising) | Evan Gore & Heather Lombard | April 20, 2013 | 0.19 |
While searching for Mrs. Twombly's missing glasses, Blythe comes across Shivers, a fast-talking squirrel with a hoarding problem. When Blythe and the pets realize Shivers is at fault for items missing from Littlest Pet Shop, they try to help him face his issue. Song: "Lost and Found Box" sung by Youngmee and Aunt Cristie, with Blythe
| 26 | 26 | "Summertime Blues" | Joel Dickie; Dallas Parker (supervising) | Story by : Julie McNally Cahill & Tim Cahill and Roger Eschbacher; Teleplay by : Roger Eschbacher | April 27, 2013 | 0.29 |
When Blythe gets accepted into the junior program at a fashion school, she, along with her family and friends from school and at Littlest Pet Shop, have to bode with the anxiety of her leaving. Songs: "Stay Here Forever" sung by the pets and "It Won't Be Long" sung by Chorus

=== Season 2 (2013–14) ===
| No. overall | No. in season | Title | Directed by | Written by | Original release date | U.S. viewers (in millions) |
|---|---|---|---|---|---|---|
| 27 | 1 | "Missing Blythe" | Joel Dickie; Dallas Parker (supervising) | Julie McNally Cahill & Tim Cahill | November 2, 2013 | 0.21 |
A few months pass since Blythe left for her summer junior program, but her dream school is not as exciting as she thought it would be when all the campus talks about is fashion. Meanwhile, aching to see her in person again, the pets come up with a plan to visit Blythe while she is away at fashion camp for the summer. Song: "F.U.N. Song" sung by Blythe, with Fashion University North students
| 28 | 2 | "The Nest Hats Craze!" | Joel Dickie; Dallas Parker (supervising) | Merriwether Williams | November 2, 2013 | 0.23 |
Blythe accidentally starts a new fashion craze with her wild "Nest Hat", inspired by a nest that lands on her head. To her shock, she finds an unhatched egg lying inside of it. The pets are chosen to take care of the newly hatched chick using their animal instincts, while Blythe tries to find the chick's mother. However, her plans fall in the hands of the Biskit twins, holding her hostage while trying to exploit her new-found fame.
| 29 | 3 | "Eight Arms to Hold You" | Joel Dickie; Dallas Parker (supervising) | Tom Minton | November 9, 2013 | 0.30 |
Russell becomes ecstatic as he reviews the plans for his first slumber party while with Blythe at the day camp. Jealous that they are not invited, Sunil and Vinnie make plans to crash their party. Meanwhile, Mrs. Twombly notices her supplies are being consumed by something, and jokingly cites a poltergeist as the cause of it, which awakens Russell's superstitions about a ghost he read up on. Later, Sunil and Vinnie's attempt to break into the pet shop sends the city without power, causing Russell to hallucinate an octopus-like creature trying to devour him.
| 30 | 4 | "Heart of Parkness" | Joel Dickie; Dallas Parker (supervising) | Story by : Mitch Larson and Adam Beechen; Teleplay by : Adam Beechen | November 16, 2013 | 0.21 |
An endangered specimen of cobra escapes from within a pet carrier of Fisher Biskit, after finding a potential buyer for it. Meanwhile, after three straight days of rain, the pets go on a walk with Blythe to their public park. Sunil breaks away from the group, and finds himself among a group of tribal raccoons, as well as a pigeon who can understand them. There, they find the escaped cobra, and Sunil saves them after confronting it using his primal instincts. They celebrate, and the raccoons force Sunil to stay with them indefinitely as their king.
| 31 | 5 | "Pawlm Reading" | Joel Dickie; Dallas Parker (supervising) | Corey Powell | November 23, 2013 | 0.27 |
Mrs. Twombly is inspired to set up a booth for a self-proclaimed pet psychic by the name of Finola, after she demonstrates her mind-reading on the pets by describing their personalities (while getting them entirely wrong). However, her predictions for other customer's pets break the bank for Mrs. Twombly; all her prognoses revolve around the pet wanting a brand of dog food. Meanwhile, the pets suffer while trying to mold themselves into Finola's personality readings, trying to avoid disrupting her partnership with Mrs. Twombly. When Blythe sees what is happening, Finola's pet sugar glider, Sweet Cheeks, may have the answer for Blythe as to what his owner's business really is.
| 32 | 6 | "The Treasure of Henrietta Twombly" | Joel Dickie; Dallas Parker (supervising) | Guy Toubes | November 30, 2013 | 0.25 |
The host of a reality television series informs Mrs. Twombly of buried treasure located beneath Littlest Pet Shop, belonging to one of her ancestors. Their efforts at excavation quickly become the source of irritation for Blythe when they start causing property damage, and the source of outrage for Pepper, who takes the crew's map to show to the pets. There, the roots of Littlest Pet Shop are uncovered, and the story of Henrietta Twombly is told in the form of flashbacks.
| 33 | 7 | "What, Meme Worry?" | Joel Dickie; Dallas Parker (supervising) | Evan Gore & Heather Lombard | December 7, 2013 | 0.16 |
On nail-clipping day at the day camp, Sunil becomes anxious about being clipped and cowers in fear in front of Blythe's friends. Jasper, who finds his worried facial expression cute, takes a picture of him with his phone and edits it into an image macro. Soon after he uploads the macro on the Internet, Sunil and the day camp attracts media coverage from across the globe. His attention becomes the source of jealousy for Zoe, and the vanity of the Biskit twins, who produce a music video of themselves in an attempt to become viral. Songs: "We're Havin' a Party, Party" sung by Unknown and "Two Times as Cute" sung by Biskit Twins, with Monsieur LeGrande
| 34 | 8 | "The Big, Feathered Parade" | Joel Dickie; Dallas Parker (supervising) | Tom Minton | December 14, 2013 | 0.26 |
When Blythe's enters her dress designs for the Big, Feathered Parade at the parade's warehouse, she is promptly denied due to age restrictions. There, she comes across Ramon (voiced by Colin Murdock), the head designer of the parade, and his common myna, Desi (voiced by Brian Drummond). Ramon becomes impressed upon seeing her designs, and decides to steal them by switching her portfolio with his identical one. Blythe notices the replacement, and when she sees her designs being used on every aspect of the parade the next day, she sets off to reclaim ownership of them. Meanwhile, when Vinnie pairs with Zoe to quench his obsession, Bruce the iguana (also voiced by Murdock), he struggles to find a water bottle big enough for Bruce. Song: "I-Guana Rhumba" sung by Vinnie
| 35 | 9 | "A Day at the Museum" | Joel Dickie; Dallas Parker (supervising) | Merriwether Williams | December 21, 2013 | 0.30 |
After losing a ball while playing catch, Minka and Penny Ling try to retrieve it when it rolls into a natural history museum. Blythe tries to retrieve the two without losing all the other pets, but finds out that the museum disallows animals. She conceals the rest in her bags and backpack, but as she spots the two that were missing, Zoe flees from her bag upon inspection from the museum's security guard. Now with three of the pets missing, Blythe must manage to find them all, eventually losing the rest in the process: Sunil and Vinnie in the taxidermy section, and Russell in a supply closet. Song: "Dino-pets" sung by Zoe, Minka and Penny Ling
| 36 | 10 | "Alligators and Handbags" | Joel Dickie; Dallas Parker (supervising) | Adam Beechen | December 28, 2013 | 0.30 |
Roger reveals to Blythe that he has just submitted Blythe's pet backpack to Mona Autumn, a critic for the top fashion magazine, Très Blasé. Knowing that Autumn's critiques are notoriously harsh, she starts panicking about her interview, ignoring the pet's problem with a new visitor, Wiggles McSunbask (voiced by Colin Murdock), a juvenile alligator who soon takes over the day camp. When Blythe's designs are rejected by Mona, as feared, and suggests that she pursues another career, she grows depressed, much to the sadness of Roger and the helplessness of the pets.
| 37 | 11 | "Blythe's Big Idea" | Joel Dickie; Dallas Parker (supervising) | Story by : Julie McNally Cahill & Tim Cahill and Roger Eschbacher; Teleplay by : Roger Eschbacher | January 4, 2014 | 0.25 |
Blythe must trade in her scooter for a sales kiosk in order for her to enter the International Pet Fashion Expo. Meanwhile, Roger's airline launches a "Pet Jet" service, with the pets using it to launch one of their largest fantasies yet. Song: "Pet Friendly Skies" sung by the pets
| 38 | 12 | "Commercial Success" | Joel Dickie; Dallas Parker (supervising) | Story by : Julie McNally Cahill & Tim Cahill and Roger Eschbacher; Teleplay by : Roger Eschbacher | January 11, 2014 | 0.21 |
Slow business prompts Mrs. Twombly to shoot a commercial for Littlest Pet Shop. Song: "Come to the Littlest Pet Shop" sung by the pets
| 39 | 13 | "So Interesting" | Joel Dickie; Dallas Parker (supervising) | Evan Gore & Heather Lombard | January 18, 2014 | 0.18 |
Penny Ling invents a convoluted tale during a story-creation session among the pets.
| 40 | 14 | "To Paris With Zoe" | Dallas Parker | Story by : Julie McNally Cahill & Tim Cahill and Adam Beechen; Teleplay by : Adam Beechen | January 25, 2014 | 0.17 |
When Blythe fills in for Zoe's owners and accompanies her to a dog show in Paris, they suddenly find themselves smitten; Blythe with the city and Zoe with a mime artist dog named Philippe. Song: "Chez Paris" sung by the pets sans Zoe and Vinnie
| 41 | 15 | "Super Sunil" | Joel Dickie; Dallas Parker (supervising) | Guy Toubes | February 1, 2014 | 0.27 |
Penny Ling decides to give Sunil a superhero outfit and make the two of them a superhero duo in order to help Sunil overcome his fears. Sunil pretends to rescue his friends, which becomes a problem when he believes he actually has superpowers. Meanwhile, with the help of Russell and Sugar Sprinkles, Blythe helps Youngmee and her aunt Christie find an ideal parking space for the Sweet Delights truck, only to compete for it against the Biskit Twins. Song: "El Cobra Cabra" sung by Chorus
| 42 | 16 | "Sweet Pepper" | Joel Dickie; Dallas Parker (supervising) | Julie McNally Cahill & Tim Cahill | February 8, 2014 | 0.25 |
Blythe must babysit Buttercream while trying to finish reading a book simultaneously, while Pepper struggles to socialize with a visitor to the day camp whom she finds herself smitten with.
| 43 | 17 | "Shanghai Hi-Jinks" | Joel Dickie; Dallas Parker (supervising) | Story by : Julie McNally Cahill & Tim Cahill and Tom Minton; Teleplay by : Tom Minton | February 15, 2014 | 0.31 |
When Blythe and the pets travel to Shanghai to attend a ceremony honoring Mrs. Twombly as originator of Kung Fu Quilting, Penny Ling is reunited with family she never knew she had. Meanwhile the pets prepare a Chinese dragon dance to ward off spirits. Song: "Dance Fu Fighting" sung by Vinnie
| 44 | 18 | "Grounded" | Joel Dickie; Dallas Parker (supervising) | Story by : Julie McNally Cahill & Tim Cahill and Corey Powell; Teleplay by : Corey Powell | February 22, 2014 | 0.16 |
The results of DNA testing for Zoe and Minka cause panic in the day camp. Meanwhile, Roger is laid off from his job as a pilot, and assumes the role of the Biskit twin's personal assistant and chauffeur instead. Song: "Biskit Twins Rhapsody" sung by Roger and Biskit Twins
| 45 | 19 | "Inside Job" | Joel Dickie; Dallas Parker (supervising) | Tom Minton | March 1, 2014 | 0.28 |
The pets are driven to madness trying to identify a hum resonating from inside the shop, while Blythe runs for class president against the Biskits. Song: "Two For One" sung by Biskit Twins
| 46 | 20 | "Plane it on Rio!" | Joel Dickie; Dallas Parker (supervising) | Story by : Julie McNally Cahill & Tim Cahill and Guy Toubes; Teleplay by : Guy Toubes | March 8, 2014 | 0.36 |
An old nemesis shows up to defeat Blythe and the pets competing in the Carnival parade in Rio. Song: "Song of Brazil" sung by Minka, with rainforest animals
| 47 | 21 | "Littlest Bigfoot" | Joel Dickie; Dallas Parker (supervising) | Story by : Dallas Parker and Roger Eschbacher; Teleplay by : Roger Eschbacher | March 15, 2014 | 0.15 |
Roger takes Blythe and the pets to go camping to find Bigfoot, whom Penny Ling befriends. Meanwhile, Blythe discovers the Biskits destroying the forest. Song: "Just Unplug" sung by Chorus
| 48 | 22 | "Sunil's Sick Day" | Joel Dickie; Dallas Parker (supervising) | Story by : Julie McNally Cahill & Tim Cahill and Merriwether Williams; Teleplay by : Merriwether Williams | March 22, 2014 | 0.29 |
Russell tries to reconcile Sunil and Vinnie's friendship after an emotional falling out sparks between them. Song: "Cyril McFlip" sung by Russell, with the girls
| 49 | 23 | "The Hedgehog In The Plastic Bubble" | Joel Dickie; Dallas Parker (supervising) | Adam Beechen | March 29, 2014 | 0.31 |
Russell and Blythe find themselves in a (partially imagined) state of solitude.
| 50 | 24 | "Standup Stinker" | Joel Dickie; Dallas Parker (supervising) | Guy Toubes | April 5, 2014 | 0.33 |
The pets try to convince Minka that she is the first monkey to land on Mars, and Pepper asks Blythe for input for her stand-up comedy act.
| 51 | 25 | "The Expo Factor" | Joel Dickie; Dallas Parker (supervising) | Story by : Julie McNally Cahill & Tim Cahill and Roger Eschbacher; Teleplay by : Roger Eschbacher | April 12, 2014 | 0.18 |
| 52 | 26 | "The Expo Factor" | Joel Dickie; Dallas Parker (supervising) | Story by : Julie McNally Cahill & Tim Cahill and Adam Beechen; Teleplay by : Adam Beechen | April 12, 2014 | 0.18 |
Blythe stresses over the upcoming International Pet Fashion Expo when she is asked to do a photo shoot for Très Blasé. Songs: "All Around The World" sung by Delilah and the pets and "Won't Have To Look Too Far" sung by the pets

==== Animated shorts ====
The day before the start of Season 3, a set consisting of 10 animated shorts started being released online by the Hasbro Studios Shorts YouTube channel. They were written by Julie McNally Cahill & Tim Cahill.

| No. overall | No. in season | Title | Written by | Original release date |
|---|---|---|---|---|
| 1 | 1 | "Tail-Rave-Ium" | Julie McNally Cahill & Tim Cahill | May 30, 2014 |
L-Zard and his crew go visit Vinnie and they all dance their tails off. Song: "Dance Party" sung by Elaine Shepherd
| 2 | 2 | "The Ladies of LPS" | Julie McNally Cahill & Tim Cahill | June 13, 2014 |
Blythe and the other girl pets sing a song about having girl time. Song: "Girl Time" sung by Blythe, Zoe, Pepper, Penny and Minka
| 3 | 3 | "Littlest Pet Peeves" | Julie McNally Cahill & Tim Cahill | June 27, 2014 |
Russell, Zoe and Sunil get annoyed from each other's noise. Song: "Everything You Do is my Pet Peeve" sung by Russell, Zoe, Sunil and Minka
| 4 | 4 | "Eau de Pepper" | Julie McNally Cahill & Tim Cahill | July 11, 2014 |
Pepper, with Penny Ling's help, tries to find and capture her happiest scent.
| 5 | 5 | "Where'd the Escargot?" | Julie McNally Cahill & Tim Cahill | August 1, 2014 |
Vinnie and Penny Ling try to save the snails from hungry Parisians.
| 6 | 6 | "Life of Cake" | Julie McNally Cahill & Tim Cahill | August 8, 2014 |
Sunil fights a cobra in order to save his piece of cake.
| 7 | 7 | "The Fire Hydrant Song" | Julie McNally Cahill & Tim Cahill | August 22, 2014 |
Zoe has a crisis of fabulousness so she sings a song to feel fabulous. Song: "Fabulous Song" sung by Zoe
| 8 | 8 | "Naptime's a Ball" | Julie McNally Cahill & Tim Cahill | September 19, 2014 |
Russell tries to get some sleep but instead ends up going on an adventure.
| 9 | 9 | "Just Not Into It" | Julie McNally Cahill & Tim Cahill | October 3, 2014 |
Russell, Vinnie and Sunil try some clothes on. Song: "Boys Don't Care About Clothes" sung by Russell, Sunil and Vinnie
| 10 | 10 | "Monkey Chase" | Julie McNally Cahill & Tim Cahill | October 17, 2014 |
Minka's imagination goes wild while she's painting.

=== Season 3 (2014–15) ===
After "The Secret Recipe", which aired on August 23, 2014, Season 3 went into hiatus until December 13, 2014. During that period, the Hub Network has been rebranded as Discovery Family.

| No. overall | No. in season | Title | Directed by | Written by | Original release date | U.S. viewers (in millions) |
|---|---|---|---|---|---|---|
| 53 | 1 | "Sleeper" | Joel Dickie; Dallas Parker (supervising) | Story by : Julie McNally Cahill & Tim Cahill and Tom Minton; Teleplay by : Tom Minton | May 31, 2014 | N/A |
Russell challenges Vinnie and Sunil to entertain Mr. VonFuzzlebut, a raccoon who is placed at the day camp. As soon as he arrives, however, he enters a deep sleep, so Vinnie and Sunil must pretend to entertain him without Russell knowing. Meanwhile, Fisher Biskit encounters difficulty finding the reason behind Littlest Pet Shop's recent success, so he sends his daughters to find out. Song: "Hangin' by a Thread" sung by Sunil and Vinnie
| 54 | 2 | "War of the Weirds" | Joel Dickie; Dallas Parker (supervising) | Roger Eschbacher | June 7, 2014 | N/A |
Mrs. Twombly tries to increase business at the pet shop. Meanwhile, the pets see a UFO and Blythe tries to help figure out what it really is.
| 55 | 3 | "Some Assistance Required" | Joel Dickie; Dallas Parker (supervising) | Adam Beechen | June 14, 2014 | N/A |
While at a photo shoot for Tres Blasé magazine, Zoe and Russell take on a passive-aggressive pet model named Tangier, who tries to sabotage Russell; simultaneously, Blythe substitutes for an assistant of Mona Autumn, the magazine's editor.
| 56 | 4 | "Secret Cupet" | Joel Dickie; Dallas Parker (supervising) | Guy Toubes | June 21, 2014 | N/A |
Blythe tries to resolve her feelings for Josh Sharp; meanwhile, Russell becomes the subject of a love spell while trying to stop a secret pet "cupid, which is revealed to be Sugar Sprinkles".
| 57 | 5 | "Hamster Hoods" | Joel Dickie; Dallas Parker (supervising) | Guy Toubes | June 28, 2014 | N/A |
Stolen merchandise from Largest Ever Pet Shop lands in Blythe's dumbwaiter. She asks Pepper and Vinnie to investigate. and their search for the culprit leads to the discovery of an elaborate tube system dug out by two hamsters, Dodger and Twist.
| 58 | 6 | "Tongue Tied" | Joel Dickie; Dallas Parker (supervising) | F.M. DeMarco | July 5, 2014 | N/A |
Pets from all over Downtown City find out that Blythe can understand them and come to her for advice, but a Korean-speaking ferret causes Blythe to doubt her abilities. While Blythe tries to help the ferret, she uses Youngmee's help to translate the language, she puts Zoe and Russell in charge of helping the other pets, where they let their egos get the better of them. Song: "A Perfect Day" sung by Blythe
| 59 | 7 | "What's So Scary About the Jungle? Everything!" | Joel Dickie; Dallas Parker (supervising) | Merriwether Williams | July 12, 2014 | N/A |
Penny Ling is excited to meet Tess, the host of her favorite show, but becomes upset when the host is afraid of her. Now Blythe must find Sunshine Sweetness (voiced by Kathleen Barr), a purple gorilla, so that she understands why Tess is afraid of pandas and gorillas.
| 60 | 8 | "Two Pets for Two Pests" | Joel Dickie; Dallas Parker (supervising) | Tom Minton | July 19, 2014 | N/A |
Blythe brings Penny Ling and Vinnie to school for Pet apperication day and tries to encourage the Biskits to keep the twin chinchillas they have owned for one day; meanwhile, Sunil tries to convince Minka that he is also an expert painter.
| 61 | 9 | "Feud for Thought" | Joel Dickie; Dallas Parker (supervising) | Story by : Adam Beechen and Roger Eschbacher; Teleplay by : Roger Eschbacher | July 26, 2014 | 0.20 |
Arguing koalas wreak havoc at the pet shop; meanwhile, Whittany ignores Brittany after she scores higher marks on a test.
| 62 | 10 | "Fish Out of Water" | Joel Dickie; Dallas Parker (supervising) | Guy Toubes | August 2, 2014 | 0.13 |
Blythe, Zoe, and Minka must rescue Josh Sharp from working for the Biskit twins. Meanwhile, the pets and a giant alligator must rescue Goldy, a goldfish, from saw blades. Song: "Treasure Out of Trash" sung by Lemasque
| 63 | 11 | "If the Shoe Fits" | Joel Dickie; Dallas Parker (supervising) | Corey Powell | August 9, 2014 | 0.16 |
When the Biskits invite Youngmee and Blythe to their party, the pets disguise as a tall man whom Fisher Biskit thinks is real.
| 64 | 12 | "The Very Littlest Pet Shop" | Joel Dickie; Dallas Parker (supervising) | Evan Gore & Heather Lombard | August 16, 2014 | 0.14 |
When a jungle curse shrinks the pet shop to dollhouse size, a nice young girl thinks the miniature pets are toys. Zoe and Blythe must find a way to stop it.
| 65 | 13 | "The Secret Recipe" | Joel Dickie; Dallas Parker (supervising) | Julie McNally Cahill & Tim Cahill | August 23, 2014 | 0.11 |
Blythe must reveal her secret in order to save Youngmee's appearance on television and their friendship. Song: "My Biggest Secret" sung by Blythe Note: This is the last episode to air on the Hub Network.
| 66 | 14 | "Winter Wonder Wha...?" | Joel Dickie; Dallas Parker (supervising) | Merriwether Williams | December 13, 2014 | 0.28 |
Blythe and Zoe spend a weekend at the Biskits' winter chateau, while the pets try to cheer up a homesick penguin. Note: This is the first episode to air on Discovery Family.
| 67 | 15 | "Snow Stormin'" | Joel Dickie; Dallas Parker (supervising) | Roger Eschbacher | December 20, 2014 | 0.11 |
A massive snow storm hits Downtown City, trapping Blythe and the pets at Littlest Pet Shop and things get tense with the pets at each other's throats. Meanwhile, Roger keeps getting lost while trying to dig through the snow to get to the pet shop to save Blythe. Song: "Chase Away the Winter Blues" sung by Blythe and the pets
| 68 | 16 | "Back Window" | Joel Dickie; Dallas Parker (supervising) | F.M. DeMarco | December 27, 2014 | 0.25 |
When Russell sprains some quills and ends up in a traction ball, he finds himself with nothing to do but stare out the back window where he is certain he catches Josh Sharp stealing Blythe’s discarded design sketches from the recycling bin.
| 69 | 17 | "Room Enough" | Joel Dickie; Dallas Parker (supervising) | Tom Minton | January 3, 2015 | 0.12 |
Blythe second-surmises her frilly room in the wake of perusing a magazine about popular high schooler rooms while the pets get peppered by a curious kitten who wants to know why Blythe can talk to them. Song: "A Different Kind of Girl" sung by Chorus
| 70 | 18 | "Why Can’t We Be Friends?" | Joel Dickie; Dallas Parker (supervising) | Story by : Julie McNally Cahill & Tim Cahill and Roger Eschbacher; Teleplay by : Roger Eschbacher | January 10, 2015 | 0.21 |
Blythe meets another young lady at the thrift shop and dismisses her old companions; Vinnie becomes friends with a spider but he has to hide his friend from Sunil because he is afraid of arachnids.
| 71 | 19 | "Pet Sounds" | Joel Dickie; Dallas Parker (supervising) | Guy Toubes | January 17, 2015 | N/A |
Blythe and the pets help Cheep-Cheep, a cousin of Minka, when he believes his scientist owner invented a helmet for pets to speak with humans. Song: "If I Could Talk to the Humans" sung by Cheep-Cheep and all pets
| 72 | 20 | "The Sister Story" | Joel Dickie & Steven Garcia; Dallas Parker (supervising) | Corey Powell | January 24, 2015 | 0.15 |
Roger’s super competitive sister, Mo, Blythe's aunt comes for a visit, bringing them a constant desire of outdoing each other. While Sunil and Vinnie compete to see who is best at predicting the future.
| 73 | 21 | "A Night at the Pawza" | Joel Dickie & Steven Garcia; Dallas Parker (supervising) | Story by : Julie McNally Cahill & Tim Cahill and Evan Gore & Heather Lombard; Teleplay by : Evan Gore & Heather Lombard | January 31, 2015 | N/A |
Blythe and Mrs. Twombly help a friend to make a showplace out of her rundown pet hotel, in spite of Fisher Biskit's determination to close down the place. Song: "Biskit Family Business" sung by Fisher Biskit and the Biskit Twins
| 74 | 22 | "Proud as a...Peacock?" | Joel Dickie & Steven Garcia; Dallas Parker (supervising) | F.M. DeMarco | February 7, 2015 | 0.13 |
The pets try to help a shy peacock prepare for his big first appearance at the agricultural gardens. Song: "You're the One" sung by Chorus
| 75 | 23 | "Sue Syndrome" | Joel Dickie & Steven Garcia; Dallas Parker (supervising) | Tom Minton | February 21, 2015 | 0.14 |
Sue needs to conquer a trepidation; Pepper is disheartened over a skunk camper. Song: "A Skunk is a Skunk" sung by Mitzi and Pepper Clark
| 76 | 24 | "In the Loop" | Joel Dickie & Steven Garcia; Dallas Parker (supervising) | Story by : Julie McNally Cahill & Tim Cahill and Mitchell Larson; Teleplay by : Mitchell Larson | February 28, 2015 | 0.16 |
Russell can't sit tight for his day to end when a repulsive groundhog arrives at day camp.
| 77 | 25 | "It's the Pet Fest!" | Joel Dickie & Steven Garcia; Dallas Parker (supervising) | Story by : Julie McNally Cahill & Tim Cahill and Roger Eschbacher; Teleplay by : Roger Eschbacher | March 7, 2015 | 0.11 |
| 78 | 26 | "It's the Pet Fest!" | Joel Dickie & Steven Garcia; Dallas Parker (supervising) | Story by : Julie McNally Cahill & Tim Cahill and Guy Toubes; Teleplay by : Guy Toubes | March 7, 2015 | 0.13 |
With time running out, Blythe must endeavor of bringing about a Pet Fest a reality. Songs: "Breathless" sung by Jason 1 and the Soul Patches and "Pets and Humans" sung by Jason 1 and the Soul Patches & Zoe and Heidi and the pets Celebrity voice actress: Heidi Klum as Heidi, the Lady Yodely of the High D.

==== Animated shorts 2 ====
| No. overall | No. in season | Title | Written by | Original release date |
|---|---|---|---|---|
| 11 | 1 | "The Biggity-Big Dog Show" | Julie McNally Cahill & Tim Cahill | October 4, 2015 |
Zoe has a skin rash on a day of an important dog show. When all hope is lost, Vinnie Terrio comes to the rescue in an unexpected way.
| 12 | 2 | "Sour Puss" | Julie McNally Cahill & Tim Cahill | October 4, 2015 |
Aboard an airplane, the pets try to cheer up a "sour puss".
| 13 | 3 | "So Like Bored" | Julie McNally Cahill & Tim Cahill | October 4, 2015 |
Whittany and Brittany are bored and try to think about what they could do to entertain themselves. Cashmere and Velvet are not happy about that. Song: "So Like Bored" sung by Wittany, Brittany, Cashmere and Velvet
| 14 | 4 | "OmmmMG" | Julie McNally Cahill & Tim Cahill | October 4, 2015 |
Sunil is trying to get Minka and Vinnie to sit still and "relax for a few moments". Song: "OmmmMG" sung by Minka, Sunil and Vinnie
| 15 | 5 | "What's Next?" | Julie McNally Cahill & Tim Cahill | November 5, 2015 |
Blythe ponders what she wants to do next in her life, with some help from Zoe, Russell and Minka. Song: "What's Next?" sung by Blythe, Zoe, Minka and Russell

=== Season 4 (2015–16) ===
On March 31, 2015, Discovery Family announced via press release that the show was renewed for a fourth season. Story editor Roger Eschbacher said that the fourth season will have 26 episodes. On June 4, 2015, Hasbro announced that My Little Pony executive producer Meghan McCarthy will be a story consultant for Littlest Pet Shop. On October 6, 2015, Eschbacher confirmed that the fourth season will be the final season of Littlest Pet Shop. The season premiered with back-to-back episodes beginning on November 7, 2015.

| No. overall | No. in season | Title | Directed by | Written by | Original release date | U.S. viewers (in millions) |
|---|---|---|---|---|---|---|
| 79 | 1 | "The Tortoise and the Heir" | Steven Garcia; Joel Dickie (supervising) | Guy Toubes | November 7, 2015 | 0.27 |
When Blythe ponders about her life calling, a century and a half aged Tortoise named Speedy Shellberg comes with an answer. He has a past linked to Blythe, as he comments his former owner Betty Smith resembles her. When Blythe mentions to her dad that there is a tortoise, Roger mentions that Blythe's mother had a tortoise when she was a kid, whom she named Speedy Shellberg. When Blythe protests that her mother's name is Lauren, Roger clarifies that her nickname was Betty, although he doesn't know how that was derived. When Blythe asks him "Betty... Baxter?" Roger explained that was only her name after marrying him, and that before doing so her last name was Smith. Meanwhile, the pets misinterpret that Blythe is giving them the silent treatment. Note: After the two-part season 3 finale "It's the Pet Fest!", Dallas Parker stepped down as Supervising Director and later Joel Dickie was promoted as the show's new Supervising Director.
| 80 | 2 | "Pitch Purrfect" | Steven Garcia; Joel Dickie (supervising) | David Shayne | November 7, 2015 | 0.23 |
Blythe is reading her mom's journal as Twombly's doorknobs are gone. Simultaneously, Zoe fails an audition for the "Pitch-Purrfect" singing group led by the purple cat Delilah. She instead chooses a cat named Fluffy, saying that Pitch-Purrfect is felines-only, and that she only invited Zoe to audition because she forgot she was a dog. When she mentions this to her friends, Sunil's pupils briefly transform into hearts and he asks if Delilah asked about him, causing Penny to smack him. When Penny laments it's too bad Zoe doesn't have her own pet-cappella group, it gives Zoe an idea. Vinnie, Penny Ling, and Sunil join her for an upcoming Alley Cappella championship song competition as the newly formed group "There's Note Stopping Us Meow". Sunil hovers in mid-air with hearts surrounding him next to Delilah until Penny pulls him away. When Zoe accuses Delilah of stealing the TNSUM song, she denies this and claims to have told the pink cat Milah to get Zoe's permission. Overcoming disappointment, the LPS group come up with a new scat singing tune "Hearty Time". Russell finally figures out by fingerprinting the stolen doorknob collection that the culprit is Twombly herself, who then explains to Blythe she sold it to buy up property in the area to create the Littlest Pet Street, her dream. Songs: "Not Every Star is in the Sky" sung by Zoe, Delilah and the cats and "Hearty Time Pet Food Jingle" sung by Zoe, Sunil, Penny Ling and Vinnie Note: This episode is referred to Pitch Perfect
| 81 | 3 | "Ivan the Terrific" | Steven Garcia; Joel Dickie (supervising) | Roger Eschbacher | November 14, 2015 | 0.20 |
Blythe helps Youngmee search for the perfect pet while the pets deal with a Russian circus bear named Ivan at the pet shop. Blythe discovers a poster and contacts his owner, a clown named Bumples, who arrives in time use his miniature car to run over Circus Animal Control Officer Clive Gimbal.
| 82 | 4 | "Senior Day" | Steven Garcia; Joel Dickie (supervising) | Story by : Julie McNally Cahill & Tim Cahill and Eric Rogers; Teleplay by : Eric Rogers | November 21, 2015 | 0.15 |
Blythe volunteers at the Sunset Siesta Retirement Village. Pepper relates how her owner's parents stayed for 3 weeks and her owner's mom used her as a towel. Penny and Russell volunteer to accompany her. An elderly woman named Lorraine (whom Blythe calls her favorite resident, in turn being nicknamed "B") at SSRV wants Blythe to meet her granddaughters. Blythe does not recognize them as the Biskit twins due to their photo being out of focus. Russell lets his dad Jerry stay with him at the pet shop.
| 83 | 5 | "Littlest Pet Shop of Horrors" | Steven Garcia; Joel Dickie (supervising) | David Shayne | November 28, 2015 | 0.19 |
Blythe returns from trick or treating, declaring "Best Halloween ever!" wearing a cowgirl hat while riding into the shop on Applejack from My Little Pony: Friendship Is Magic (there voiced by Ashleigh Ball who voices Blythe). Her costume has her legs in Applejack's flank while she has tiny fake human legs pretending to ride the costume. After Youngmee arrives dressed as Mount Rushmore, the pets appear as zombies and turn Youngmee into a zombie, causing Blythe to instead say this is the worst Halloween ever. This turns out to be a scary story she's telling the pets, prompting a contest that Vinnie judges. Penny says she doesn't like to tell horror stories but can be featured in them. A jetlagged Roger lives a nightmare trying to make it home, encountering a werewolf, witches and hockey player. Russell tells a story about a bat named Vlad who turns out to be a vampire. Zoe's story of an under-catered event falls flat. Pepper tells a story about a celebrity getting into a car accident during a snowstorm and being cared immobilized by an insane fan who wants to care for them. It turns out to be a dream but when Pepper attends the comedy show, the audience is filled with crazy-eyed Pennys. Minka skips her turn, saying she can't top Pepper. Sunil tells the story of his great grandfather Dr. Sunilenstein where Nurse Minka is a hunchbacked assistant who calls him master. The green-skinned ghoul resembles Vinnie. Pepper (with torch) and Zoe and Pepper (with pitchforks) appear as angry villagers led by Russell. Buttercream Sundae makes a cameo as the green ghoul's dance partner. Song: "Dude is a Vampire" sung by Russell and Vlad
| 84 | 6 | "Game of Groans" | Steven Garcia; Joel Dickie (supervising) | F.M. DeMarco | December 5, 2015 | 0.17 |
Blythe takes Russell, Vinnie, and Sunil to the Downtown City Renaissance Fair. On the way Russell fantasizes he is "Sir Hedge" riding on horseback carrying the fair maiden Penny Ling who is swooning over him after he saved her from a fire-breathing dragon.
| 85 | 7 | "The Tiniest Animal Store" | Steven Garcia; Joel Dickie (supervising) | Guy Toubes | December 12, 2015 | 0.14 |
When a TV producer comes to LPS to get something for a pig, he notices Blythe talking to the animals and decides to make a TV show based on the premise. Blythe agrees to help in exchange for being able to help with costume design, but is worried this might expose her secret. Zoe is disappointed to find out that it will be humans playing the pets instead of themselves, but is still happy when she thinks a famous actress will be portraying her, until she finds out she is not among the three pets chosen to be in the show. The actresses playing Blythe and Minka (and actors playing Russell and Vinnie) come to the store to study their subjects. Blythe finds out that her costumes were turned down for the show. The concept involves an island princess being transformed into a brunette by space aliens, with Russell being stupid and Vinnie being a mongoose-eater, which upsets Sunil, while Minka's portrayal as a klutz annoys her. Eventually the pets crash the show and get everyone kicked out. Blythe finds out that her costume designs impressed the wardrobe later who has offered her an internship. Song: "The Tiniest Animal Store Jingle" sung by Choir
| 86 | 8 | "Spendthrifty" | Steven Garcia; Joel Dickie (supervising) | Roger Eschbacher | December 19, 2015 | 0.12 |
While Minka is experimenting with giving pajama-clad Blythe different hairstyles, Roger arrives to give her a new Sweetest Sweetsie Baby Doll from Japan, which Minka distrusts. Blythe's friend Kora calls and offers to let her replace her as a sales clerk the Thirfty Armoire. She accepts, but this proximity causes her to become a shopaholic. The other pets soon encounter the disturbing Japanese doll.
| 87 | 9 | "Un-vetted" | Steven Garcia; Joel Dickie (supervising) | Nick Confalone | December 26, 2015 | 0.10 |
Zoe develops a crush towards her new veterinarian's German Shepherd while Blythe and Russell spend the night camping on a freezing mountain. Song: "Can't Give Up" sung by Zoe and Russell
| 88 | 10 | "Pump Up the Panda" | Steven Garcia; Joel Dickie (supervising) | Eric Rogers | January 2, 2016 | 0.09 |
Blythe debuts her new pet beachwear line; Penny Ling meets a lobster eager to get her in shape; Sunil and Vinnie face off in an intense sandcastle-building contest. Song: "Summer Sunsations" sung by the pets
| 89 | 11 | "Snipmates" | Steven Garcia; Joel Dickie (supervising) | David Shayne | January 9, 2016 | 0.16 |
Blythe and her ex-F.U.N. roommate, McKenna Nicole compete in a fashion show, while the pets try to figure out the cause of Sugar Sprinkle's sudden grouchy behavior. Song: "Pain and Suffering" sung by Sugar Sprinkles
| 90 | 12 | "Guilt Tripping" | Steven Garcia; Joel Dickie (supervising) | Adam Beechen | January 16, 2016 | N/A |
Blythe feels guilty when she unintentionally causes Whittany and Brittany to be suspended from school while Pepper goes numb while waiting for punishment from Vinnie when she accidentally breaks his lucky rock. Song: "The Guilty Tango" sung by Blythe and Pepper
| 91 | 13 | "Petnapped!" | Steven Garcia; Joel Dickie (supervising) | Guy Toubes | January 23, 2016 | N/A |
A cocker spaniel is taken by her false owner and the pets try to reenact an episode of Russell's favorite show.
| 92 | 14 | "Steamed" | Steven Garcia & Mike Myhre; Joel Dickie (supervising) | Nick Confalone | March 26, 2016 | N/A |
Blythe assists Mrs. Twombly in setting up her new coffee shop. While Russell uses Sugar Sprinkle's song to help Pepper release her coffee scent to attract customers. Song: "Pawrista's Coffee" sung by Sugar Sprinkles
| 93 | 15 | "Two Peas in a Podcast" | Steven Garcia & Mike Myhre; Joel Dickie (supervising) | Roger Eschbacher | March 26, 2016 | N/A |
The pets are horrified when they believe Penny Ling will be moving away, despite trying to tell them a cruciating detail about it; elsewhere, after watching Blythe's success in vlogcasting, the Biskits try to create one of their own, but eventually get desperate.
| 94 | 16 | "Go Figure!" | Steven Garcia & Mike Myhre; Joel Dickie (supervising) | F.M. DeMarco | April 2, 2016 | N/A |
Vinnie and Sunil get lost at a sci-fi convention when they attend it with Blythe and Vinnie is eventually sold off for auction when he is mistaken for a figurine; while Minka wants to master Zen from a visiting Grasshopper, but her hyper-activeness and the grasshopper's interest in Russell interferes with this.
| 95 | 17 | "A Doggie Biskit" | Steven Garcia & Mike Myhre; Joel Dickie (supervising) | David Shayne | April 9, 2016 | N/A |
Poppy Pawsley, Eliza Biskit's dog, is reluctant to partake in another dog show while Wiggles McSunbask returns to LPS as a guru for self-assistance.
| 96 | 18 | "It's a Happy, Happy, Happy, Happy World" | Steven Garcia & Mike Myhre; Joel Dickie (supervising) | Story by : Julie McNally Cahill & Tim Cahill and Eric Rogers; Teleplay by : Eric Rogers | April 16, 2016 | N/A |
A happy-go-lucky quokka named Peachy Fluffton encourages a grumpy Sunil to find happiness in the city, but he gets separated from his friends when they try to follow him. All the while, Blythe loses her journal while doing community service with Josh Sharp and they scramble to retrieve it.
| 97 | 19 | "Race Team: Buttercream" | Steven Garcia & Mike Myhre; Joel Dickie (supervising) | Guy Toubes | April 23, 2016 | N/A |
When Buttercream attends an underground bunny race with Vinnie and Sunil, the starting bell has a hypnotic effect on her, turning her into a competitive brute named Flash McCarrot. Meanwhile, Roger coerces Blythe to stop getting on her cell phone too much. Eventually, Vinnie and Sunil take the phone and it is won by an arrogant bunny racer at the races. So when Sunil and Vinnie discover Buttercream's condition, they must rely on their friend to win back Blythe's phone when she discovers that Josh Sharp is trying to contact her.
| 98 | 20 | "On the Same Page" | Steven Garcia & Mike Myhre; Joel Dickie (supervising) | Roger Eschbacher | April 30, 2016 | N/A |
Blythe worries that she may lose her communication gift based upon an entry in her mother's journal. Meanwhile, with the girl pet's stuff crowding up the daycamp, the boys and girls have a falling out and the boys decide to use the upstairs foyer as a hangout joint, but both sides start to miss the respective gender. Song: "To Tell You The Truth" sung by Blythe and the pets
| 99 | 21 | "Paint a Picture, It'll Last Longer" | Steven Garcia & Mike Myhre; Joel Dickie (supervising) | Nick Confalone | May 7, 2016 | N/A |
Blythe takes credit for one of Minka's paintings when the monkey is embarrassed by it.
| 100 | 22 | "Bake It 'til You Make It" | Steven Garcia & Mike Myhre; Joel Dickie (supervising) | David Shayne | May 14, 2016 | N/A |
Blythe enlists her famous cousin to help around Sweet Delights while Sunil's parents visit and he pretends to be a doctor for their happiness.
| 101 | 23 | "LPS: The Moosical" | Steven Garcia & Mike Myhre; Joel Dickie (supervising) | F.M. DeMarco | May 21, 2016 | N/A |
A French-Canadian moose named Fleur Le Moose begins making the pets ear sore with her nervous singing (made into bellowing) and Blythe, being part Canadian, is the only one who hears a charming tune from her, but must get her to stop when her bellowing threatens a reunion with Mrs. Twombly's old college band.
| 102 | 24 | "Seeing Red" | Steven Garcia & Mike Myhre; Joel Dickie (supervising) | Julie McNally Cahill & Tim Cahill | May 28, 2016 | 0.16 |
Blythe writes a story about her parents as teenagers while Penny Ling becomes curious about a red panda who visits the pet shop.
| 103 | 25 | "Littlest Pet Street" | Steven Garcia & Mike Myhre; Joel Dickie (supervising) | Guy Toubes | June 4, 2016 | 0.20 |
| 104 | 26 | "Littlest Pet Street" | Steven Garcia & Mike Myhre; Joel Dickie (supervising) | David Shayne | June 4, 2016 | 0.20 |
Blythe is able to get viral video star Felina Meow to appear at Littlest Pet Street's Grand Opening, but she and the pets have to fly to her island home to pick her up for her appearance. Song: "Cinepetmatic" sung by the pets Celebrity voice actress: Casey Wilson as Felina Meow Note: This two-part episode marks the series finale.
