= Littlest Pet Shop: A World of Our Own =

Children's animated television series

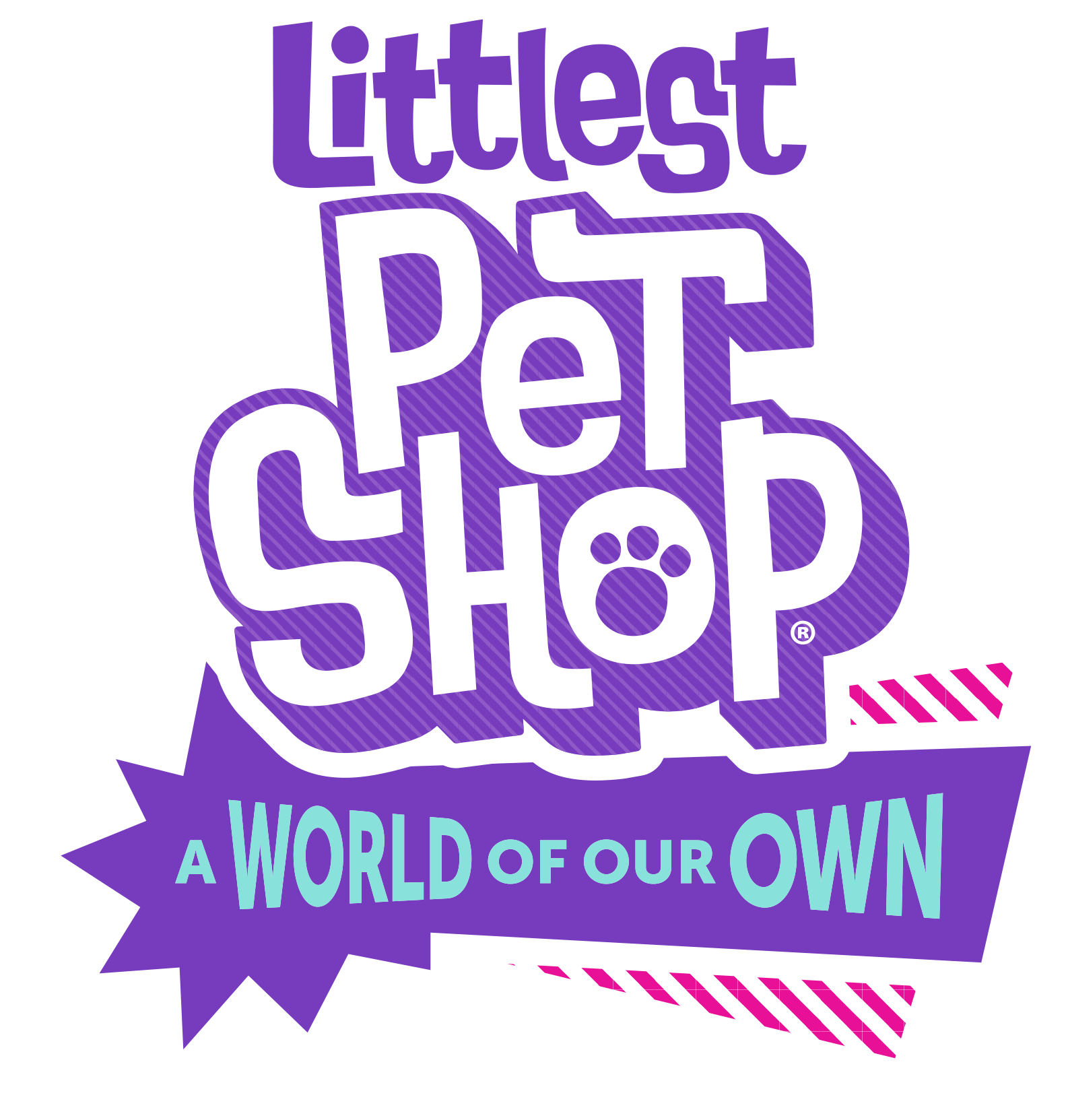
- Genre: Comedy; Fantasy; Adventure
- Based on: Littlest Pet Shop by Hasbro
- Developed by: Tim Maile and Douglas Tuber
- Directed by: Gillian Comerford
- Creative director: Ronald Alcantara
- Voices of: Lili Beaudoin; Diana Kaarina; Ingrid Nilson; Rhona Rees; Kyle Rideout; Travis Turner; Shannon Chan-Kent; Vincent Tong
- Theme music composer: Jess Furman; Ethan Roberts; Jessica Charlotte Vaughn; Dave Cowen
- Opening theme: "Littlest Pet Shop: A World of Our Own Main Title" by Bethany Brown
- Composer: Dave Cowen
- Countries of origin: United States; Ireland
- Original language: English
- No. of seasons: 1
- No. of episodes: 52

Production
- Executive producer: Stephen Davis
- Producers: Peter Lewis; Tim Maile and Douglas Tuber
- Running time: 11 minutes (Note: Aired as 2 segments of 22 minutes.)
- Production companies: Boulder Media Limited; Allspark Animation (Note: Known as Hasbro Studios for earlier episodes.)

Original release
- Network: Discovery Family (Note: Episodes have premiered early on Tiji in France, Carousel in Russia, MiniMini+ in Poland, Treehouse TV in Canada, PLUSPLUS in Ukraine, and Minika GO in Turkey.)
- Release: April 14 (Note: The series first premiered in France on April 9, 2018.) – December 22, 2018

Related
- Littlest Pet Shop (1995 TV series); Littlest Pet Shop (2012 TV series)

Littlest Pet Shop: A World of Our Own is an animated children’s television series developed by Tim Maile and Douglas Tuber for Discovery Family. The series aired from April 14 to December 22, 2018, centered on a group of pets who use a magical portal to exit the human world and enter the world of Paw-Tucket. Based on the 2018 relaunch of the American toy franchise Littlest Pet Shop, this was the third television series based on the franchise overall, after the 2012 TV series and the 1995 TV series.

== Premise ==
The series focuses on a group of six pets (Roxie, Jade, Trip, Quincy, Edie, and Bev) who exit the human world they live in often to go through a magical portal only used by them, which sends them to the world of Paw-Tucket, a community made for and by pets. In this world they are able to have adventures, throw parties, make new friendships, and be themselves.

== Production ==
On February 20, 2018, Discovery Family ordered 52 episodes of Littlest Pet Shop: A World of Our Own from Allspark with a premiere date of April 14, 2018. The series went under the working title of Littlest Pet Shop Unleashed, and was originally meant to be a streaming service exclusive before landing on Discovery Family.

The series was intended to have a second season of 52 episodes, as confirmed by many voice actors who have worked on the series. However, the studio side of Hasbro allegedly wanted to go in a "new, fresh direction" with their content and brands, resulting in them cancelling their recent productions, including A World of Our Own.

Hasbro was also planning to produce a theatrical film based on the Littlest Pet Shop franchise in 2017, which was scrapped during early development. Though little information has been provided surrounding its existence, it is possible that the film was ultimately reworked into this series, seeing as how the film would have also been produced by Boulder Media.

== Characters ==
The main pets from left to right: Savannah Cheetaby, Bev Gilturtle, Edie Von Keet, Jade Catkin (on bottom), Trip Hamston (on top), Roxie McTerrier, and Quincy Goatee.

=== Main ===
- Roxie McTerrier (voiced by Diana Kaarina) is a hyper, optimistic and loyal Boston Terrier. She cares a lot about her friends, but she can be very naive at times. She likes eating food and having fun.
- Jade Catkin (voiced by Ingrid Nilson) is a sarcastic and gothic bombay cat who is Roxie's roommate ever since the latter destroyed the floor in her old home. She is also Roxie's best friend but dislikes admitting it. Her favorite thing to do is sleep.
- Trip Hamston (voiced by Travis Turner, who, like the character, is a rapper) is an adventurous and confident but sometimes goofy hamster. He is also a rapper.
- Quincy Goatee (voiced by Kyle Rideout) is an easily frightened fainting goat who faints easily. He is Trip's best friend and roommate. In the episode "Pitch Im-Purr-Fect" it is revealed that he isn't good at singing but he is a good tap dancer.
- Edie Von Keet (speaking voice by Lili Beaudoin and singing voice provided by Diana Kaarina) is a fancy and dramatic parakeet who is a talented actress. She always tends to be greedy for the spotlight, which is a reflection of her 14-year-old owner.
- Bev Gilturtle (voiced by Rhona Rees) is an energetic blue box turtle. She tries her hardest to entertain the other pets. She likes trying out various kinds of activities.

=== Recurring ===
- Savannah Cheetaby (voiced by Bethany Brown) is a very famous cheetah pop star in Paw-Tucket.
- Petula Woolwright (voiced by Diana Kaarina) is a purple sheep who is the main antagonist of the series and the leader of "the snobs".
- Sweetie Pom-Pom (voiced by Brittney Wilson) is a tan pomeranian who is one of Petula's sidekicks.
- Gavin Chamelle (voiced by Alessandro Juliani) is a chameleon in Petula's gang. Juliani also voices Mayor Perrito, a Chihuahua who acts as the self-appointed mayor of Paw-Tucket due to his name being revealed as Mayor.
- Mitchell Snailford (voiced by Ian Hanlin) is a dimwitted brown snail and another one of Petula's sidekicks.
- Mister Yut (voiced by Vincent Tong) is a red Siamese fighting fish responsible for managing the commerce in Paw-Tucket. Tong also voices Scoot Raccoonerson, a sneaky raccoon who thinks that trash is valuable, and Austin Goldenpup, an obedient Golden Retriever in the human world, whom Roxie has a crush on and who works for Mister Yut at the Littlest Pet Shop.
- Captain Gilturtle (voiced by Brian Drummond) is a blue sea turtle, Bev's uncle, and head captain of the LPS cruise ship.
- Manny Mouser (voiced by Ryan Beil) is a highly intelligent yellow mouse, an inventor.
- Carmilla Wingbat (voiced by Lanie McAuley) is an incredibly shy fruit bat who prefers to stay in the shadows. She has an incredible singing voice and acting skills. She works as a crew member, and later, actress at Paw-Tucket theater. She also has the ability to use echolocation.
- Pearl (voiced by Shannon Chan-Kent) is a salon cat worker from the shaking dry salon.

== Episodes ==
No.	Title	Episodic director	Written by	Original release date	Prod. code	US viewers (millions)
1	"A Pet's Best Friend Is..."	Estrela Lourenço	Tim Maile and Douglas Tuber	April 14, 2018 (Note: These episodes premiered on TiJi on April 9, 2018 in France.)	101	0.06
2	"Pet, Peeved"	Adrian Ignat	Tim Maile and Douglas Tuber	April 14, 2018	102	0.06
3	"The Wheel Deal"	Estrela Lourenço	Char Easton and Maggie Parr	April 14, 2018 (Note: This episode premiered on TiJi on April 10, 2018 in France.)	103	0.06
4	"In the Steal of the Night"	Adrian Ignat	Professor Rich	April 14, 2018 (Note: This episode premiered on TiJi on April 11, 2018 in France.)	104	0.06
5	"Pitch Im-Purr-Fect"	Estrela Lourenço	Nina Bargiel	April 21, 2018 (Note: This episode premiered on TiJi on April 12, 2018 in France.)	105	0.06
6	"The Big Sleep-Over"	Adrian Ignat	Kelly D'Angelo and Nick Watson	April 21, 2018 (Note: This episode premiered on TiJi on April 13, 2018 in France.)	106	0.06
7	"Let It Go (Not the Hit Song)"	Estrela Lourenço	Rachelle Romberg	April 28, 2018 (Note: This episode premiered on TiJi on April 16, 2018 in France.)	107	0.06
8	"The Fast and Fur-ious"	Adrian Ignat	Ralph Greene	April 28, 2018 (Note: This episode premiered on TiJi on April 17, 2018 in France.)	108	0.06
9	"Show Your Beau"	Estrela Lourenço	Dave Polsky	May 5, 2018 (Note: This episode premiered on TiJi on April 18, 2018 in France.)	109	0.05
10	"A Brave New Quincy"	Adrian Ignat	Jordana Arkin	May 5, 2018 (Note: This episode premiered on TiJi on April 19, 2018 in France.)	110	0.05
11	"All Decked Out"	Estrela Lourenço	Tim Maile and Douglas Tuber	May 12, 2018 (Note: This episode premiered on TiJi on April 20, 2018 in France.)	111	0.04
12	"Bev on the Edge"	Adrian Ignat	Whitney Ralls	May 12, 2018 (Note: This episode premiered on TiJi on April 23, 2018 in France.)	112	0.04
13	"The Call of the Mild"	Estrela Lourenço	Rick Williams	May 19, 2018 (Note: This episode premiered on TiJi on April 24, 2018 in France.)	113	0.05
14	"Four Left Feet"	Adrian Ignat	Heather Nuhfer	May 19, 2018 (Note: This episode premiered on TiJi on April 25, 2018 in France.)	114	0.05
15	"Copycats, Copy-Dogs & Copy-Iguanas"	Estrela Lourenço	Kara Lee Burk	May 26, 2018 (Note: This episode premiered on TiJi on April 26, 2018 in France.)	115	0.06
16	"The Imitation Game"	Adrian Ignat	Steve Aranguren	May 26, 2018 (Note: This episode premiered on TiJi on April 27, 2018 in France.)	116	0.06
17	"The Purr-fect Storm"	Estrela Lourenço	Kate Leth	June 2, 2018	117	0.05
18	"Spooky Tails"	Adrian Ignat	Tim Maile and Douglas Tuber	June 2, 2018	118	0.05
19	"Crystal Fever"	Estrela Lourenço	Julia Prescott	June 9, 2018	119	0.09
20	"So Trip Thinks He Can Dance?"	Adrian Ignat	Jenna Martin	June 9, 2018	120	0.09
21	"Fine, Feathered Fortune Teller"	Estrela Lourenço	Professor Rich	June 16, 2018	121	0.05
22	"Scrappers Keepers"	Adrian Ignat	Kelly D'Angelo and Nick Watson	June 16, 2018	122	0.05
23	"Bev Rolls with It"	Estrela Lourenço	Rachelle Romberg	June 23, 2018 (Note: This episode premiered on MiniMini+ on June 19, 2018 in Poland.)	123	0.05
24	"CEO Trip"	Adrian Ignat	Ralph Greene	June 23, 2018 (Note: This episode premiered on MiniMini+ on June 20, 2018 in Poland.)	124	0.05
25	"The Incredible Roman and Ray"	Estrela Lourenço	Char Easton and Maggie Parr	June 30, 2018 (Note: This episode premiered on MiniMini+ on June 21, 2018 in Poland.)	125	0.06
26	"Paw It Forward"	Adrian Ignat	Jordana Arkin	June 30, 2018 (Note: This episode premiered on MiniMini+ on June 22, 2018 in Poland.)	126	0.06
27	"Mayor May Not"	Estrela Lourenço	Heather Nuhfer	July 13, 2018	133	0.03
28	"The Scratch Tree Society"	Adrian Ignat	Sam Freiberger	July 13, 2018	134	0.03
29	"Clear the Fear" "Fear Factor"	Estrela Lourenço	Dave Polsky	October 6, 2018 (Note: This episode premiered on Treehouse TV on September 1, 2018 in Canada, and on PLUSPLUS on September 14 in Ukraine.)	127	0.05
30	"The Jade Luck Club" "Good Luck Jade"	Adrian Ignat	Tim Maile and Douglas Tuber	October 6, 2018 (Note: This episode premiered on Treehouse TV on September 2, 2018 in Canada, and on PLUSPLUS on September 14 in Ukraine.)	128	0.05
31	"Double Booked Bev"	Estrela Lourenço	Rick Williams	October 6, 2018 (Note: This episode premiered on Treehouse TV on September 8, 2018 in Canada, and on PLUSPLUS on September 15 in Ukraine.)	129	0.04
32	"Nine Lives to Live" "As the Hamster Wheel Turns"	Adrian Ignat	Whitney Ralls	October 6, 2018 (Note: This episode premiered on Treehouse TV on September 9, 2018 in Canada, and on PLUSPLUS on September 15 in Ukraine.)	130	0.04
33	"Homesick as a Dog"	Adrian Ignat	Jenna Martin	October 13, 2018 (Note: This episode premiered on PLUSPLUS on September 17, 2018 in Ukraine, and on Treehouse TV on September 22 in Canada.)	131	0.03
34	"Sleepless in Paw-Tucket" "Never to Bed"	Adrian Ignat	Tim Maile and Douglas Tuber	October 13, 2018 (Note: This episode premiered on PLUSPLUS on September 17, 2018 in Ukraine, and on Treehouse TV on September 23 in Canada.)	132	0.03
35	"Biggest Fan" "Nightmare at 30,000 Bleats"	Adrian Ignat	Heather Nuhfer	October 27, 2018 (Note: This episode premiered on PLUSPLUS on September 18, 2018 in Ukraine, on Treehouse TV on September 29 in Canada, and on Minika GO on October 21 in Turkey.)	135	N/A
36	"Pet Side Story"	Adrian Ignat	Kate Leth	October 27, 2018 (Note: This episode premiered on PLUSPLUS on September 18, 2018 in Ukraine, and on Treehouse TV on September 30 in Canada.)	136	N/A
37	"Seeing Double"	Adrian Ignat	Rachelle Romberg	November 3, 2018 (Note: This episode premiered on PLUSPLUS on September 19, 2018 in Ukraine, and on Treehouse TV on October 6 in Canada.)	137	N/A
38	"The Ancient Art of Clean Fu" "Trip Kwan Do"	Adrian Ignat	Jim Martin	November 3, 2018 (Note: This episode premiered on PLUSPLUS on September 19, 2018 in Ukraine, and on Treehouse TV on October 7 in Canada.)	138	N/A
39	"Hidden Treasures & Guilty Pleasures" "With Friends Like These"	Adrian Ignat	Jenna Martin	November 10, 2018 (Note: This episode premiered on PLUSPLUS on September 20, 2018 in Ukraine, and on Treehouse TV on October 13 in Canada.)	139	N/A
40	"Take This Suggestion" "Take This Suggestion And..."	Adrian Ignat	Tim Maile and Douglas Tuber	November 10, 2018 (Note: This episode premiered on PLUSPLUS on September 20, 2018 in Ukraine, and on Treehouse TV on October 14 in Canada.)	140	N/A
41	"Surf and Turf Shindig"	Adrian Ignat	Whitney Ralls	November 17, 2018 (Note: This episode premiered on Treehouse TV on October 20 in Canada.)	141	N/A
42	"Austin La Vista"	Adrian Ignat	Greg Levine	November 17, 2018 (Note: This episode premiered on Treehouse TV on October 21 in Canada.)	142	N/A
43	"Big Sis, Lil Pup"	Adrian Ignat	Rachelle Romberg	December 1, 2018 (Note: This episode premiered on Treehouse TV on October 27 in Canada, and on Minika GO on November 24 in Turkey.)	143	N/A
44	"Trip for the Record"	Adrian Ignat	Rick Williams	December 1, 2018 (Note: This episode premiered on Treehouse TV on November 3 in Canada, and on Minika GO on November 25 in Turkey.)	144	N/A
45	"The Couch Is Always Greener..."	Adrian Ignat	Professor Rich	December 8, 2018 (Note: This episode premiered on Treehouse TV on November 4 in Canada, and on Minika GO on November 25 in Turkey.)	145	N/A
46	"Model Behavior"	Adrian Ignat	Tim Maile and Douglas Tuber	December 8, 2018 (Note: This episode premiered on Treehouse TV on November 10 in Canada, and on Minika GO on November 26 in Turkey.)	146	N/A
47	"Surprise! Paw-Zombies!"	Adrian Ignat	Sam Freiberger	December 15, 2018 (Note: This episode premiered on Treehouse TV on November 11 in Canada.)	147	N/A
48	"The Big Paw'd-Cast"	Adrian Ignat	Kate Leth	December 15, 2018 (Note: This episode premiered on Treehouse TV on November 17 in Canada, and on Minika GO on November 26 in Turkey.)	148	N/A
49	"Curiosity and Cats"	Adrian Ignat	Tim Maile and Douglas Tuber	December 22, 2018	149	N/A
50	"Fetch the Story Stick"	Adrian Ignat	Greg Levine	December 22, 2018	150	N/A
51	"Eyes and Ears of Paw-Tucket"	Adrian Ignat	Whitney Ralls	December 22, 2018	151	N/A
52	"Get Her to the LPS"	Adrian Ignat	Tim Maile and Douglas Tuber	December 22, 2018	152	N/A

== Shorts ==
=== "Littlest Pet Shop" shorts ===
No.	Title	Original release date
1	"Welcome to the Littlest Pet Shop"	October 4, 2017
2	"Welcome to the Cruise Ship"	October 11, 2017
3	"Welcome to the PetUltimate Apartments"	October 18, 2017
4	"Welcome to the Fitness Center"	October 25, 2017
5	"Welcome to the Shake 'n Dry Salon"	November 1, 2017
6	"Welcome to Paw-Tucket Stadium"	November 8, 2017
7	"Welcome to Spin Class"	November 15, 2017
8	"Welcome to Chill-Out Inn"	November 22, 2017
9	"Welcome to Paw-Tucket Park"	November 29, 2017
10	"Welcome to the Amusement Park"	December 6, 2017

=== "Late Night Bev" shorts ===
No. overall	No. in season	Title	Original release date
11	1	"Talent Search"	February 20, 2018
12	2	"Unboxing Live!"	February 27, 2018
13	3	"Hip-Hop Dance-Off!"	March 6, 2018
14	4	"Interview w/ Mac Hedgyhog"	March 13, 2018
15	5	"Bollywood Dance-Off!"	March 20, 2018
16	6	"Manny About Town"	March 27, 2018
17	7	"Ballet Dance-Off!"	April 3, 2018
18	8	"Ice Dance-Off!"	April 10, 2018
19	9	"Interview w/ Savannah Cheetaby"	April 17, 2018
20	10	"Modern Dance-Off!"	April 24, 2018

== Broadcast ==
Littlest Pet Shop: A World of Our Own received its worldwide debut on TiJi in France on April 9, 2018. The series later debuted on Discovery Family in the United States on April 14, 2018.

The series has premiered on Treehouse TV in Canada on June 2, 2018. It started premiering on Pop in the United Kingdom and Ireland on September 3. It premiered on 9Go! in Australia on October 5. In 2020, the series premiered on e.tv in South Africa. It premiered on Discovery Kids in Latin America and Brazil in July 7.

Reruns on Discovery Family ended in November 2023.

== Reception ==
Emily Ashby of Common Sense Media rated Littlest Pet Shop: A World of Our Own a 2 out of 5 stars, stating that the series "does little to challenge the notion that it's an extended commercial for the brand," and claims that the stories are formulaic and the characters are mostly one-dimensional."
