= Littlest Pet Shop (2012 TV series) =

Children's television series, 2012–2016

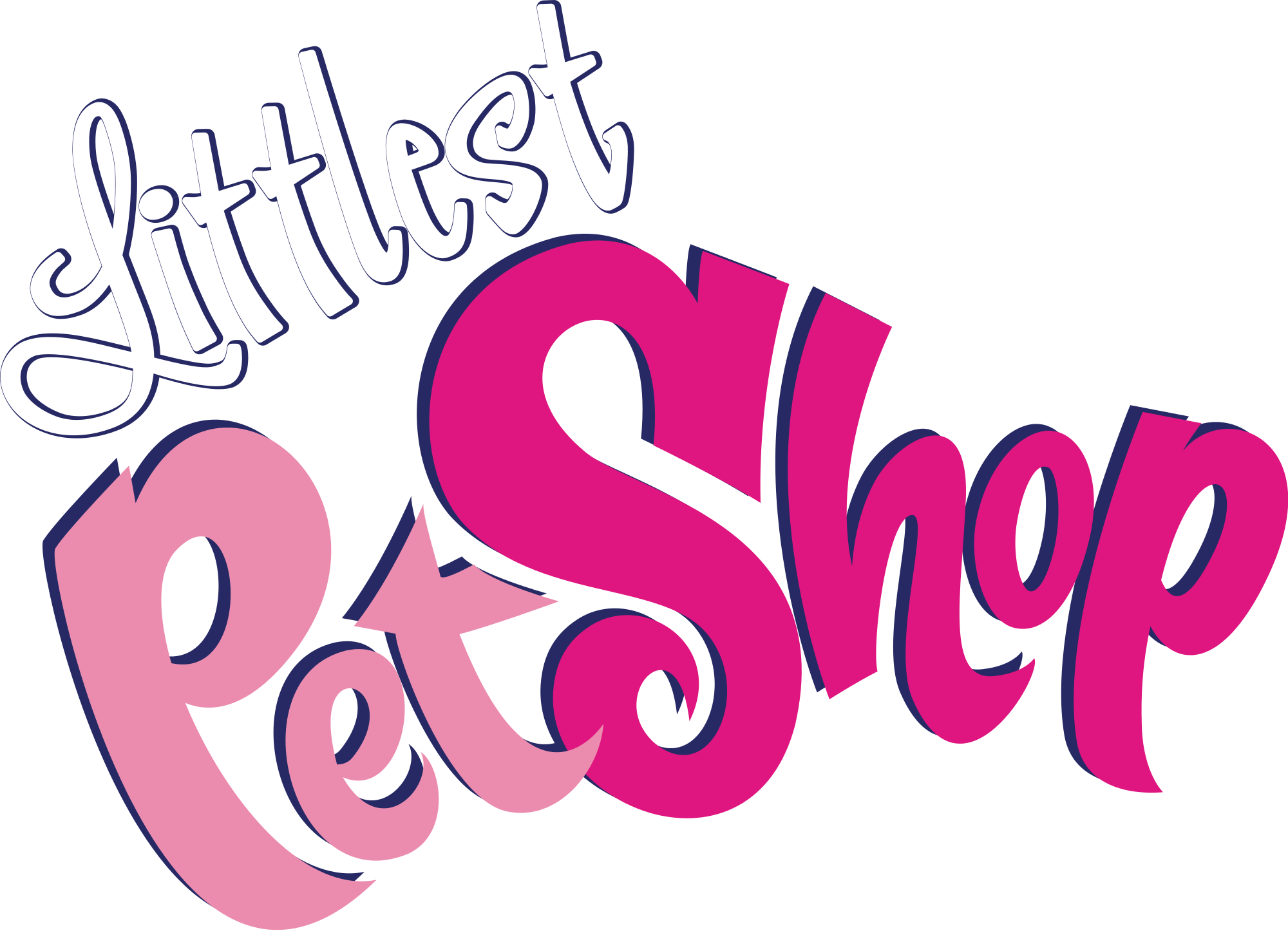
- Genre: Comedy; Fantasy; Slapstick; Musical; Adventure
- Based on: Littlest Pet Shop and Blythe by Hasbro
- Developed by: Julie McNally Cahill; Tim Cahill
- Directed by: Joel Dickie (S1–3); Steve Garcia (S4); Mike Myhre (S4)
- Voices of: See § Cast
- Theme music composer: Daniel Ingram
- Composers: Daniel Ingram; Steffan Andrews
- Countries of origin: United States; Canada
- Original language: English
- No. of seasons: 4
- No. of episodes: 104 (list of episodes)

Production
- Executive producers: Julie McNally Cahill; Tim Cahill; Chris Bartleman (S1–2); Kirsten Newlands; Stephen Davis
- Producers: Chantal Hennessey (S1–3); Lesley Jenner (S3–4)
- Running time: 22 minutes
- Production companies: DHX Media Vancouver; Hasbro Studios

Original release
- Network: Discovery Family (Note: Known as The Hub/Hub Network before October 13, 2014)
- Release: November 10, 2012 – June 4, 2016

Related
- Littlest Pet Shop (1995); Littlest Pet Shop: A World of Our Own (2018)

Littlest Pet Shop is an animated children's television series produced by Hasbro Studios and animated by DHX Media. The series is based on Hasbro's Littlest Pet Shop and Blythe toy lines and was broadcast on Discovery Family from November 2012 to June 2016. It centers on Blythe Baxter, a teen girl who, after moving into an apartment in Downtown City, gains the ability to communicate with animals. Below her apartment is the eponymous pet store where Blythe works and talks to a group of pets at a daycare in the shop. Worried that a corrupt rival business might drive their shop out of business, Blythe drives business into the store with her pet fashion designs.

Reviewers praised the series' writing and characters, but criticized its embedded marketing. Several crew members received accolades for working on the series. The series was part of the company's franchise reboot. Hasbro released a new line of Littlest Pet Shop toys designed to more closely resemble the characters on the series. A mobile game and comic book adaptation were also made.

== Premise ==
The series follows Blythe Baxter, a young girl living with her airplane pilot father, Roger. Forced to move out from her suburban hometown following her father's promotion to the rank of airline captain, she moves into an apartment located in a place called Downtown City. Their complex is located above the eponymous Littlest Pet Shop — a pet shop that also serves as a day camp for numerous pets — where Blythe works as a fashion designer. Her adventure begins when she discovers that she alone can miraculously understand and talk to the pets that regularly stay at the shop, in addition to most other animals on the planet. As she and the pets spend time together, they find the pet shop jeopardized by a larger pet store managed by Fisher Biskit and his snotty twin daughters Brittney and Whittney Biskit. To avoid being dispersed, the pets convince Blythe to remain an employee.

The pets who reside in the day camp of the shop are Pepper Clark, a wisecracking striped skunk who is passionate about comedy; Minka Mark, a bouncy spider monkey with a love for painting and visual arts; Penny Ling, a sensitive giant panda interested in rhythmic gymnastics; Russell Ferguson, a hedgehog who is often the self-appointed leader of his animal bunkmates; Sunil Nevla, an Indian mongoose and hopeful magician; Vinnie Terrio, a clumsy gecko obsessed with dancing; and Zoe Trent, a diva-like Cavalier King Charles Spaniel with a talent for singing. Other human characters include Mrs. Anna Twombly, owner of the shop and Blythe's boss; and Youngmee Song, Jasper Jones, and Sue Patterson; Blythe's friends.

== Episodes ==
Season	Episodes		Originally released		
Season	Episodes		First released	Last released	Network
1	26		November 10, 2012	April 27, 2013	The Hub/Hub Network
2	26		November 2, 2013	April 12, 2014	The Hub/Hub Network
3	26	13	May 31, 2014	August 23, 2014	The Hub/Hub Network
3	26	13	December 13, 2014	March 7, 2015	Discovery Family
4	26		November 7, 2015	June 4, 2016	Discovery Family

== Cast ==
=== Main cast ===
- Ashleigh Ball – Blythe Baxter, Shea Butter, Lemonface, Hubble, Baa Baa Lou, Fluffy Lighting, Alice, Sally Hairspray, Sheriff Blythe, Green Bean Fairy Queen, Claustrophobic Turtle, Farmer's Market Sheep, Witness Snail, Mitzi, Seal, Red Songbird
- Sam Vincent – Russell Ferguson, Esteban Banderas, Sam U.L., Sunil's Dad, Steve, Sweet Cheeks, Canine Cop, Captain Cuddles, Panda Elder, Speedy Shellberg, Weasel Whiskers, Fisher Biskit, Morgan Payne, Josh Sharp, Mr. Bromidic, Mr. Banks, Sherman, Mr. Sawdust
- Peter New – Sunil Nevla, Mary Frances, 3DGB, Digby, Joey Featherton, Otto Von Fuzzlebutt, Whiskers, Dodger, Weber, Basil, Big Al, Harold Winston, Ivan, Vlad, Tenzing Norgert, Francois LeGrande, Christopher Lyedecker, Riley Robinson, Fred, Littlest Pat, John Trent
- Kyle Rideout – Vinnie Terrio
- Tabitha St. Germain – Pepper Clark, Gail Trent, Sunil's Mom, Cairo, Mushroom, Delilah Barnsley, Parker, Nutmeg Dash, Philippa, McKenna Nicole, Finola Frumt, Mona Autumn, Stephanie Hart, Tess McSavage, Clarissa Trent, Sunshine Sweetness
- Kira Tozer – Minka Mark, Olive Shellstein, Christie, Sue Patterson, Tanya Twitchel, Ginny Hues
- Nicole Oliver – Zoe Trent, Genghis, Tiger, Cashmere Biskit, Velvet Biskit, Scarletta Redd, Clover Fields, Mrs. Mondt, Cindeanna Mellon
- Jocelyne Loewen – Penny Ling, Meow-Meow
- Kathleen Barr – Anna Twombly, Madame Pom, Poppy Pawsley, Scout Kerry, Dolores, Fleur le Moose, Jasper Jones, Henrietta Twombly, Vi Tannabruzzo, Robinnia Amster
- Shannon Chan-Kent – Brittney Biskit, Whittney Biskit, Youngmee Song, Madison, Brittman Biskit, Whittman Biskit, Phoebe
- Michael Kopsa – Roger Baxter, Chef Henri
- Cathy Weseluck – Buttercream Sundae, Jane, Judi Jo Jameson

=== Additional cast ===
- Brian Drummond – Fuzzy Gumbopaws, Shivers, Shahrukh, L-Zard, Ollie Arms, Desi, Jerry Ferguson, Shakespeare, Lord Twigg
- Colin Murdock – Ramon, Tangier, Wiggles McSunbask, Cheep-Cheep, Twist, Bob Flemingheimer, Oliver St. Oliver
- Kelly Metzger – Sugar Sprinkles
- Brooke Goldner – Emma Hart, Peachy Fluffton
- Terry Klassen – Dr. Handsomeface, Princess Stori Jameson
- Casey Wilson – Felina Meow
- Heidi Klum – Heidi
- Dan Sioui – Jason 1
- Anne Yoo – Jebbie
- Lee Tockar – Sideburns

== Origin ==
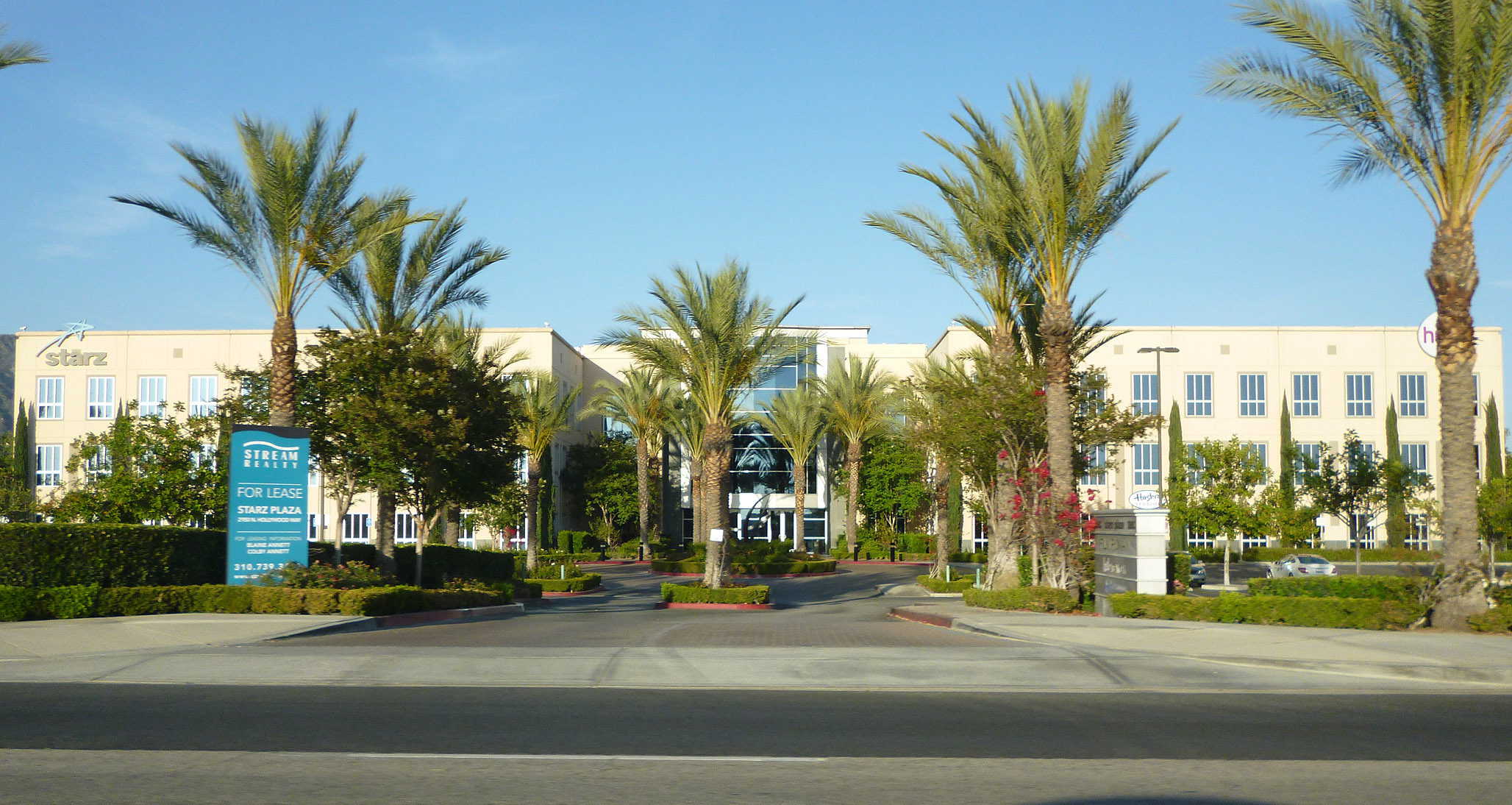
The developers Cahills joined Hasbro Studios (headquarters pictured) in 2011

Hasbro owns the rights of both Blythe and Littlest Pet Shop, toy lines respectively introduced in 1972 and 1992. Both lines were originally manufactured by Cincinnati-based Kenner Products. Kenner became a part of Hasbro when the Pawtucket-based company acquired Tonka (the parent company of Kenner back then) in 1991. Hasbro sold Littlest Pet Shop toys under the name of this division until they closed down Kenner's original Cincinnati headquarters in 2000. Claster Television, Hasbro's television arm at the time, had produced an earlier animated show based on Littlest Pet Shop in 1995 for Hasbro, but the 2012 Littlest Pet Shop series marked the first adaptation of the Blythe doll to a character on television. A prior incarnation of such a character is the protagonist of Littlest Pet Shop Presents, an unrelated animated miniseries produced by Cosmic Toast Studios and released by Hasbro exclusively on the internet.

Julie McNally-Cahill and Tim Cahill, the creators of Cartoon Network's My Gym Partner's a Monkey, developed Littlest Pet Shop upon joining Hasbro Studios in September 2011. The two serve as both executive producers and story editors on the show; also working as executive producers are Chris Bartleman and Kirsten Newman. The show was announced in March 2011, based on Hasbro's 2010 introduction of the Blythe Loves Littlest Pet Shop toy line. Margaret Loesch, then-CEO of the Hub Network—a network partly owned by Hasbro and Discovery Communications—commissioned the series.

== Production ==
Given Hasbro's framework for Littlest Pet Shop, the Cahills pitched their adaptation of the property. Hasbro originally felt discouraged over having the show set at the pet store, finding the exchange of animals they thought would come from that disconcerting. The Cahills saw the studio's definition of such stores as antiquated, convincing them that most modern locations provide grooming and daycare services as opposed to merely selling pets. Production followed quickly, to their surprise.

The studio defined only Blythe and the pets as characters, so the Cahills sought to expand the human character's fictional universe, designing Blythe's friends, Mrs. Twombly and the Biskit twins. Julie explained that she and her husband's preference for quirky comedy inspired that of the show. While the show is aimed at a demographic of young girls, (Note: Under the TV Parental Guidelines, the show is rated TV-Y, indicating a program appropriate for all children. In specific, Common Sense Media assessed the show as appropriate for ages four and up.) Julie explain that she and the writers attempt to cater to boys of the same age and parent viewers simultaneously. Original music for the show is accomplished by film and television composers Daniel Ingram and Steffan Andrews. Ingram wrote that the urban setting of Littlest Pet Shop prompted the use of a modern style of music. The score incorporates pop and different cultural influences for the same reason. Ingram found Hasbro's pushing of the limitations for music in daytime television a source of pride.

Each 22-minute episode takes approximately a year to complete; three to four episodes are produced simultaneously. Storyboard artists depict scenes using SketchBook Pro. Adapting these boards to limited animation, studio DHX Media handles the designs, poses, and keyframes of movement for each character appearing in a given scene for an episode, as well as background art. DHX hands these assets to a separate studio, where the remaining animation is finished using Adobe Flash. The speed of production is throttled slightly by Blythe having two unique outfits per episode, according to director Joel Dickie. Supervising director Dallas Parker similarly explained that the variety of assets created for each episode challenged the process of Flash animation in reusing movements.

== Release ==
=== Broadcast ===
The Hub aired the first two episodes of Littlest Pet Shop in succession on November 10, 2012. The network scheduled these episodes to succeed the third season premiere of My Little Pony: Friendship Is Magic, based on the My Little Pony toy line which is also owned by Hasbro. The network ordered 26 episodes for its first season, concluding it on April 27, 2013. A second season, also of 26 episodes, premiered on November 2, 2013, and concluded on April 12, 2014. A third season of the same number of episodes aired from May 31, 2014, to March 7, 2015. During this season, the network shifted management and was renamed to Discovery Family. A fourth and final season was aired from November 7, 2015, to June 4, 2016.

=== Home media and streaming services ===
Shout! Factory has acquired North American distribution rights for programs broadcast by The Hub, releasing several DVD sets for Littlest Pet Shop. Clear Vision, a distributor located in the United Kingdom, obtained the rights for its first two seasons for most of European regions and the Middle East. Beyond Home Entertainment handles distribution in Australia. On April 11, 2013, Hasbro announced that it would add Littlest Pet Shop to the Netflix streaming service. The show was added in the summer of that year.

Region 1
DVD title	Season(s)	Episode count	Release date	ASIN
Little Pets, Big Adventures	1	5	January 15, 2013	B009INAMA8
Sweetest Pets	1	5	June 4, 2013	B00BNAE6LK
Pet-acular Escapades	1	5	October 1, 2013	B00DOZNIHU
Lights, Camera, Fashion!	1	5	December 17, 2013	B00EVDZT94
Strike a Pose!	1–2	5	June 3, 2014	B00HRUQBLI
Passport to Fashion	2	5	September 23, 2014	B00KTFJ6HE
Pet Shop Pals	1–2	5	March 17, 2015	B00QJN33DS
Paws for Applause	1–3	5	June 16, 2015	B00UART8AG
Halloween Fest	1–3	5	September 1, 2015	B00YT9IVZE

Region 2
DVD title	Season(s)	Episode count	Release date	ASIN
Little Pets, Big Adventures	1	5	August 3, 2015	B00X110K1O
Lights, Camera, Mongoose!	1	6	October 19, 2015	B013HYQETQ

Region 4
DVD title	Season(s)	Episode count	Release date
Blythe's Big Adventure	1	5	November 6, 2013
Sweetest Pets	1	5	November 6, 2013
Pet-acular Escapades	1	5	February 2, 2014
Lights, Camera, Fashion!	1	5	April 28, 2014

== Reception ==
Littlest Pet Shop became one of the Hub Network's top programs in 2013. Both the show and My Little Pony: Friendship Is Magic were outperforming shows aimed at similar demographics internationally, according to Stephen Davis, president of Hasbro Studios. Hasbro rebooted their toy line in accordance with the show; newer collections features customizable sets for fans to "create, decorate and personalize their own scenes" inspired by episodes.

Writing for the parent-focused organization Common Sense Media, Emily Ashby found the show unimpressive. She praised Blythe as a model of "integrity, self-confidence, loyalty, and creativity" but found fault with product placement and the "run-of-the-mill" pet characters. Mercedes Milligan of Animation Magazine, however, described the varied personalities of the pet characters as the most endearing trait of the show. Writing in Entertainment Weekly, Hillary Busis found the Biskit twins amusing as characters. Busis praised the twenty-first episode of the first season in particular, which contains a parody of both Toddlers & Tiaras and the Christopher Guest–directed film Best in Show. An homage to Star Trek was singled out by Hanh Nguyen in TV Guide.

Tori Michel of About Entertainment gave praise to a DVD set containing five episodes of the first season. She wrote that despite the intended demographic, older children in elementary and middle school would find the writing humorous, while girls would find the pet characters entertaining the most. The Dove Foundation member Donna Rolfe gave the same set a full five stars.

The show was nominated at the 40th Daytime Creative Arts Emmy Awards for the song "If You're a Guy" in 2013, but it lost this to 3rd & Bird. Oliver's portrayal of Zoe won her an award from ACTRA and the Union of British Columbia Performers. New, who voices Sunil, was nominated for this but lost to Oliver. Ingram and Andrews were nominated for Leo Awards for their work as composers of the episode "Lights, Camera, Mongoose!" in 2014. The duo later won this nomination in common.

== Related products ==
=== Mobile game ===
Littlest Pet Shop
- Developer: Gameloft
- Publisher: Hasbro
- Platforms: iOS; Android
- Release: WW: November 22, 2012
- Genre: City-building

As part of a contractual agreement with Hasbro, Gameloft developed a mobile game based on the show. Released in the same year the show premiered, on November 22, the game is of the city-building genre. The game, Littlest Pet Shop, is freemium software—microtransactions allows users to speed up the progression of the game. The game provides over 150 animal companions for users to collect; minigames allow players to take care of these pets. Its initial release was for the iOS platform. An Android port was released shortly afterwards. However, the game had got shut down sometime around early/mid-(possibly May) 2021.

Writing in TouchArcade, Jared Nelson wrote that the game is unexceptional for players who are not fans of the toy line. While in the United Kingdom the game was subject of controversy concerning its incorporation of in-app purchases, the Advertising Standards Authority deemed it acceptable. The organization found that the instructions detailing purchases did not coerce players to make such purchases.

=== Comic book ===
IDW Publishing was commissioned to adapt Littlest Pet Shop to a comic book. An adaptation made up of five issues, released from May 7 to September 17, 2014, was written by Georgia Ball and Matt Anderson and illustrated by Nico Peña and Antonio Campo. Anderson had worked on the shorter, contained stories, while Ball had scripted the remainder of each issue.

Different from the other Hasbro properties Ball had worked on, she explained that Hasbro wanted the comic to entertain readers rather than be morally didactic. She likened this to the principle of "no hugging, no learning" coined on the set of Seinfeld. Apart from that, the studio gave Ball a license to give Blythe hobbies not depicted on the show. Ball focused on writing stories that would appeal to readers transitioning from primary to secondary education. She described the structure of the comic as a daily drama, while Anderson thought of it as slice of life.
