= Littlest Pet Shop =

Toy franchise

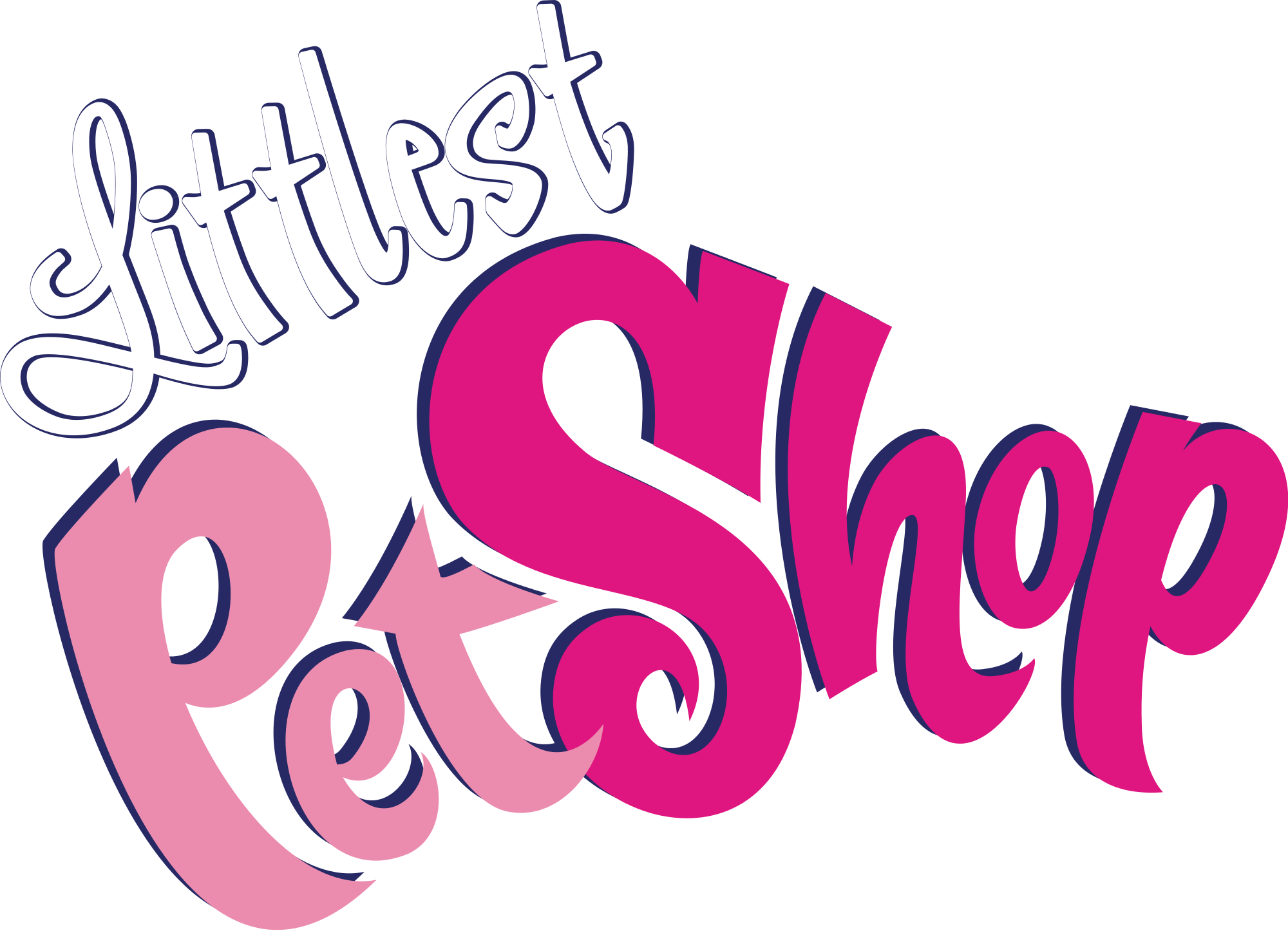
- Type: Figurine
- Invented by: Kenner
- Company: Kenner (Former); Hasbro (Current); Basic Fun! (Under license)
- Country: United States
- Availability: 1992–present
- Materials: Rubber (earlier pets were made up of plastic)
- Slogan: How big is your Littlest Pet Shop? (2005–2012); Little Pets, BIG Personalities! (2012-2014); Who's in Your Littlest Pet Shop? (2014–2017); Unleash the Bobble! (2023-Present)
- Official website

Littlest Pet Shop (LPS) is a toy franchise and cartoon series owned by Hasbro, originally conceptualized by Kenner Products in 1992, and currently under license with Basic Fun!. Originally a line of animal figurines with magnets or movable parts, the line was relaunched as a line of chibi-esque bobbleheads in 1992, with over 3,000 different pet figurines produced since its relaunch. The franchise is highly successful and has seen numerous iterations.

Several spin-off media works have been developed based on the toyline, including three animated television series, a series of video games for the Nintendo DS and Wii consoles, and two distinct online world games. The first cartoon was produced by Sunbow Entertainment and aired for 40 episodes in 1995, the second by Hasbro Studios for The Hub in 2012, and the third in 2018.

The line was considered one of Hasbro's top-selling brands in 2007 and they were considered by publications such as USA Today to be one of the biggest Christmas toys of the time. A large collector community exists surrounding the 2000s incarnation of the brand, with some toys selling for high prices on second-hand online markets. A YouTube community also formed around the toys, known as "LPSTube", where fans create skits and web series using the toys as "actors," such as "LPS: Popular."

== History ==
=== Kenner toys (1992-1997) ===
Introduced in 1992 and produced by Kenner for children who weren't able to have real life pets, the original incarnation of the toys consist of plastic animal figurines sold in playsets, which each came with a gimmick such as a magnet or a moving part (e.g. flapping wings). The starter set was a suitcase-like plastic container with shelves and compartments, intended to simulate a pet shop. Various kinds of licensed merchandise were produced. A few lines of figures were produced between 1995 and 1996 based on the television show, but otherwise the two were largely connected only by name. This line is also sometimes known by fans and collectors as "Generation 1", as it was the first iteration of the toy line to be released. Toys produced in the final years of production are marked Tonka, Kenner's parent company. The line ceased production in 1997, and Hasbro closed the Kenner offices in 2000.

=== Generation 2 ===
A group of generation 2 Littlest Pet Shop toys.

Hasbro re-launched the Littlest Pet Shop brand in 2005 with a completely overhauled look designed by Gayle Middleton. This incarnation of the line, which stand at around an inch tall, have larger heads, smaller bodies, and large expressive eyes inspired by Japanese chibi designs. They have bobbleheads and originally featured a round pink or blue magnet located on the bottom of their feet, which was used to activate other magnetic functions in various playsets and accessories. Due to choking hazard concerns, the magnets would be removed in 2009, instead being replaced with holes to be used with pegs.

This series of pets were released in single packages, in pairs, in large packs, and alongside large playsets. Pets occasionally held exclusivity to only one store, such as Costco or Toys "R" Us. The "Teeniest Tiniest" series was released in 2007, featuring miniature version of the toys and small, pop-up playsets that could be clipped to bags. In 2010, the previously Kenner-owned Blythe dolls were introduced into the brand with the "Blythe Loves Littlest Pet Shop" series. Special pets were released at San Diego Comic-Con in 2009 and 2010.

The generation 2 pets, with a large community of adult collectors, now often sell for a premium second-hand on online platforms such as EBay, especially particularly rare pets such as variants, store exclusives, mail-order, prototype, and event pets. In 2020, Marie Claire reported the value of the 2009 San Diego Comic-Con shorthair cat at $800.

=== Generation 3 ===
In generation 3, the line was revamped to coincide with the release of the 2012 TV series, with Blythe now as a central character. The style and design of the toys were changed significantly, such as removing the bobble-heads. This incarnation of the brand had low sales and was overall unpopular among customers. These pets had interactivity with Gameloft's mobile app using a "pet collector" token, allowing kids to play with their favorite pets on the go.

=== Generation 4 and 5 ===
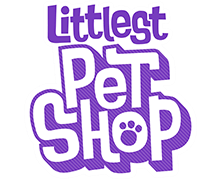
The logo during Generation 5

Beginning in 2014, the generation 4 and 5 pets have molds that more closely resemble the style of the TV series and were given names. These toys also feature "deco bits", small plastic accessories that can be used to decorate the pets. Hasbro released the Pets Pawsabilities collection during this time, and in 2016, the Pets in the City collection, which more closely resembles the pets released in generation 2. This era features the return of the bobble-headed designs.

A hamster toy released during this iteration invoked a lawsuit from Fox News anchor Harris Faulkner, due to the toy sharing her name and allegedly her likeness. The case was quickly settled after Hasbro ceased selling the pet.

=== Generation 6 ===
The Littlest Pet Shop toys were revamped once again in 2017, with new molds and rounded eyes similar to the second generation pets. The pets in this line come in three sizes: teensie, mini, and classic (the largest of the three). This line featured several series of pets each with a distinct gimmick, such as galaxy-themed designs. It was also during this time that a new show premiered on Discovery Family called Littlest Pet Shop: A World of Our Own.

=== Generation 7 ===
In 2022, Basic Fun! announced that they had obtained the license to the brand and would be relaunching the generation 2 style bobblehead pets, which would release in 2024. Each toy pack is accompanied by a collectible card and digital code. Basic Fun! mostly used the original molds from generation 2, but also introduced new molds based on currently popular animals, such as the axolotl and capybara mold. The brand currently markets itself to adult collectors as much as it does to children.

== Reception ==
Generation 2 of Littlest Pet Shop, the most well-known generation, has primarily received positive reception. In 2007, Hasbro cited the brand as one of their top sellers, having sold over 60 million of the toys in just two years. In 2017, the VP of Hasbro, Andrea Hopelain, told Kidscreen that fans love "the collectibility of the Littlest Pet Shop figures". Playthings listed it as one of the most popular collectibles for children in 2008. Because of the brand's success, it was later launched in various countries outside of the United States, such as the UK, France, Italy, and Chile.

The "Biggest Littlest Pet Shop" playset, released in 2006, was noted as being "basically sold out everywhere" in a TV broadcast from CNN that year. They go on to talk about the portable pets, mentioning that they "play well with the set" and that children enjoy collecting the toys. In a 2024 article, USA Today listed Littlest Pet Shop as the most popular Christmas toy of 2008, alongside the Rubik's Revolution. However, not all reception was positive, as Alanna Bennett wrote for The Mary Sue in 2011 that the 2005 incarnation of the pets had big heads that were "uncomfortably in your face", comparing them to Bratz dolls.

The Generation 7 revival has also seen favorable reception, with a representative for the European distributor, Bandai, saying that they have been "blown away by the reception which Littlest Pet Shop has received". In a review for The Toy Insider, Samantha Connell writes that the toys are "perfect for animal lovers" and that the collector cards feature "an adorable photo of the figure". An article for Good Housekeeping says they are "impressed with the brand's recent relaunch", and tells readers who grew up with the toys that they can have fun playing with the new incarnation with their own kids.

=== Community ===
In the 2000s, a YouTube community based around skits and web series starring the toys emerged, known as LPSTube, with the first video being uploaded in 2007. Improvised and homemade props are commonly used in videos. One of the most well-known video series in the community is SophieGTV's Littlest Pet Shop: Popular, a 2010 high school drama series following a dachshund named Savannah Reed. The series had amassed millions of views on the platform as of 2024.

== Other products ==
In 2006, Hasbro released the Littlest Pet Shop digital pet, a line of keychain attached electronic games similar to the Tamagotchi. The digital pet is not the only electronic toy to be made based on the franchise – electronic diaries and plug-and-play games have also been produced. Various plush toys based on the franchise have also been released over the years, including a launch of 6-inch and 4-inch collectible plush in 2025, as well as plushes that tied into the Littlest Pet Shop VIPs and Littlest Pet Shop Online virtual worlds. In 2010, the LPSO Dancing Dog speaker was released, which would dance to music when plugged into a computer or MP3 player, similar to another Hasbro product, the iDog.

Aside from just toys, various other forms of merchandise based on the IP have been produced – including but not limited to apparel, activity sets, bath soap, food products, and cellphone accessories.

== Media adaptations ==
=== Animated TV series ===
==== Littlest Pet Shop (1995) ====
An animated series based on the original Kenner incarnation of the franchise that premiered in 1995, produced by Sunbow Productions and DIC Entertainment in collaboration with Jean Chalopin Creativite et Developpement. The series follows a group of five animal characters who reside in a pet shop on the fictional Littlest Lane. It ran for a single season of 40 episodes.

==== Littlest Pet Shop (2012) ====
An animated series that corresponded to the 2012 reboot of the franchise, focusing on the human character Blythe working at a pet shop where the animals can talk to her. The series was produced by Hasbro Studios and DHX Media and ran for four seasons on The Hub, ending in 2016.

==== Littlest Pet Shop: A World of Our Own (2018) ====
An animated series produced by Hasbro Studios and Boulder Media Limited for Discovery Family. The series premiered on April 14, 2018 and ran for 52 eleven-minute episodes. The show was canceled after only one season.

=== Online virtual worlds ===
A screenshot of the Littlest Pet Shop VIPs online world.

==== Littlest Pet Shop VIPs (2007–2010) ====
Littlest Pet Shop VIPs (short for Virtual Interactive Pets) was a toys-to-life online virtual world that launched in October 2007. Similar to other sites at the time such as Webkinz, the physical VIPs plush toys came with codes on their collars that could be used to unlock the pet in game. These plush toys are required in order to collect virtual pets and other items. The site featured numerous minigames and an in-game virtual currency named Kibble. The game was made in the hopes of targeting a slightly older demographic than usual. Unlike most virtual worlds, the game offered very little in the way of multiplayer interaction. The game was shut down in 2010 due to a decline in players and high server costs.

==== Littlest Pet Shop Online (2009–2011) ====
The second virtual world based on the toyline, developed in collaboration with Electronic Arts and launched in October 2009. It is commonly and officially abbreviated as LPSO. Unlike VIPs, a plush toy was not required in order to play, though players' options would be limited without paying. Players can decorate their own houses and host parties within them, chat with other users, and play minigames. In 2010, the game was updated to add a new region, Kittywood. It lasted two years until its closure in 2011.

==== Littlest Pet Shop on Roblox (2023–present) ====
In December 2023, a Littlest Pet Shop game was launched on Roblox, as a collaboration between Basic Fun!, Hasbro and Suit Up Games. Players are able to virtually collect the bobble-head animals using codes similar to the previous mobile games in the franchise.

=== Console video games ===
Littlest Pet Shop Net Jet (2007)

In 2007, Hasbro released Windows PC-based game system Net Jet. Users could unlock games via plug in "game keys" (in USB form), purchased from retailers. With the Littlest Pet Shop (My Teeniest Town) key, players could enjoy the feature game which included eight mini-games. The key would also allow users to choose three more games from the online game selection on the Net Jet. The Net Jet was discontinued at the end of 2009, and the game is no longer functional.

Littlest Pet Shop: Biggest Adventure (2007)

A plug-and-play game for the Littlest Pet Shop franchise was released in 2007. The game could be played by plugging the included controller into a TV or VCR with AV input. The game allowed players to adopt a pet, play games, and care for the pet. Players could earn in-game currency "kibble", and use it to buy in-game items such as toys, accessories, or adopt more pets.

==== Littlest Pet Shop (2008) ====
A video game developed by Electronic Arts was released in October 2008 for Windows, Wii, and Nintendo DS. The goal of the game was to build the largest collection of pets and "complete" your LPS world. Three versions of the game were released for the Nintendo DS upon original release – Jungle, Garden, and Winter. A fourth version, Spring, was released for the DS in 2009. Each Littlest Pet Shop title included universal and exclusive pets. The Wii version included all universal and exclusive pets from the DS versions, excluding the later released Spring version. In 2009, a stripped-down DSIWare version was released.

==== Littlest Pet Shop Friends (2009) ====
A sequel to Littlest Pet Shop video game, Littlest Pet Shop: Friends, was released in October 2009 for Wii and Nintendo DS. The aim of the game was to gather materials for the "Party Palace" and invite pets to add to the party’s guestlist. Like the first title, there was a singular version for the Wii and multiple versions for the Nintendo DS – Country Friends, City Friends, and Beach Friends. Each version had exclusive pets unavailable on the other DS versions.

==== Littlest Pet Shop Biggest Stars (2010) ====
In 2010, Hasbro released Littlest Pet Shop Biggest Stars, the third in the trilogy of Littlest Pet Shop console games. This title was a Nintendo DS exclusive. Three versions of the game were released: Pink Team, Blue Team, and Purple Team. Players need to train their pets in minigames so the pets can join the pink, blue, or purple team.

=== Mobile games ===
==== Littlest Pet Shop (2012) ====
A mobile game based on the 2012 cartoon series, developed by Gameloft. It was released on November 22, 2012. Toys released during this time period came bundled with tokens that could be scanned to win in-game prizes. The game has been discontinued.

==== Littlest Pet Shop: Your World (2014) ====
The second mobile game from Gameloft, released in 2014. This game attracted some criticism for its use of expensive microtransactions, with real money being used to purchase an in-game currency used to buy new pets. Similar to the 2012 game's token system, the game utilized "zap codes", codes similar to QR codes which are printed on the pets themselves. Players could collect and care for 150 different virtual pets based on the toys, with their world expanding as the user plays more. The game has been discontinued.
