= List of Dick Figures episodes =

Dick Figures is an American animated comedy series created and written by Ed Skudder and Zack Keller. It ran for five seasons from 2010 to 2014. In addition, Dick Figures: The Movie was released in 2013.

== Series overview ==
| Season | Episodes | Originally released | |
| Season | Episodes | First released | Last released |
|---|---|---|---|
| Pilot | | September 2010 | |
| 1 | 10 | November 18, 2010 | March 24, 2011 |
| 2 | 10 | April 21, 2011 | August 25, 2011 |
| 3 | 10 | September 22, 2011 | January 26, 2012 |
| 4 | 10 | April 5, 2012 | August 2, 2012 |
| Movie | 12 | September 17, 2013 | December 2, 2013 |
| 5 | 11 | August 27, 2013 | July 10, 2014 |
| M.w.S. | 3 | October 4, 2015 | November 8, 2015 |

== Episodes ==
=== Pilot (2010) ===
| No. | Title | Written by | Original release date | YouTube release date |
|---|---|---|---|---|
| 0 | "Stick Figures" | Ed Skudder & Zack Keller | September 2010 | August 25, 2012 |
Early iterations of Red and Blue meet on a street, where Red panics about not having fingers. Later on, the duo slay a giant fire-breathing turtle.

=== Season 1 (2010–11) ===
| No. overall | No. in season | Title | Directed by | Written by | Original release date |
|---|---|---|---|---|---|
| 1 | 1 | "A Bee or Something" | Ed Skudder & Zack Keller | Ed Skudder & Zack Keller | November 18, 2010 |
A recently dumped Blue meets up with Red on the street. Red has recently gained an auto-tuned voice after swallowing a bumblebee, and uses it to annoy Blue and attract women. First appearances of Red, Blue, the Raccoon and Fat Girl.
| 2 | 2 | "Panda Hat" | Ed Skudder & Zack Keller | Ed Skudder & Zack Keller | December 2, 2010 |
Red gets drunk at a bar on his birthday, leading to him harassing the other patrons of the bar and drunkenly throwing up on Blue.
| 3 | 3 | "Flame War" | Ed Skudder & Zack Keller | Ed Skudder & Zack Keller | December 16, 2010 |
Red and Blue pay a violent visit their local Maulmart in hopes of obtaining a copy of Flame War: Attack of the Trolls, which Red believes is the "greatest video game ever released". Whilst at Maulmart, Blue secures a date with a woman called Pink by saving her life (saving her from a grenade that he threw at her). Red and Blue eventually obtain the game and discover the sole objective of the game is to shoot at memes. First appearances of Pink and Mr. Dinkleberry, Red & Blue's landlord.
| 4 | 4 | "Traffic Jams" | Ed Skudder & Zack Keller | Ed Skudder & Zack Keller | December 30, 2010 |
Blue is stuck in traffic, and Red does not help the situation when he abruptly enters Blue’s car and annoys him by changing the radio station and breaking his airbag. Shortly afterwards, a giant, fire-breathing turtle attacks the highway.
| 5 | 5 | "Steakosaurus" | Ed Skudder & Zack Keller | Ed Skudder & Zack Keller | January 13, 2011 |
Red is hungry and wishes to eat a dinosaur, so he and Blue purchase a time machine from the Racoon and go back in time to the prehistoric era.
| 6 | 6 | "OMG" | Ed Skudder & Zack Keller | Ed Skudder & Zack Keller | January 27, 2011 |
Blue suffers a string of psychotic and ridiculous dreams, including waking up next to Pink's severed head and getting attacked by possessed toys. At the end, it is revealed the whole episode was an alcohol-induced dream from the Raccoon.
| 7 | 7 | "Trouble Date" | Ed Skudder & Zack Keller | Ed Skudder & Zack Keller | February 10, 2011 |
Blue and Pink go on a date at a posh French restaurant. Red and his new hypersexual girlfriend Stacy arrive and ruin the date by eating their food, acting inappropriately and setting the tablecloth on fire. First appearance of Stacy.
| 8 | 8 | "Kitty Amazing" | Ed Skudder & Zack Keller | Ed Skudder & Zack Keller | February 24, 2011 |
Whilst taking out the trash, Red discovers a cat in the dumpster. Red takes the cat (which he has christened "Kitty Amazing") out to impress girls, only for him and Blue to discover the cat can inflict fatal heart attacks on anyone that looks in its eyes.
| 9 | 9 | "Role Playas" | Ed Skudder & Zack Keller | Ed Skudder & Zack Keller | March 10, 2011 |
The Brave Knight Maroon and his trusty wizard companion Cerulean attempt to rescue the Pinkcess from the clutches of King Richard the Long Shaft. First appearance of Lord Tourettes.
| 10 | 10 | "Attack of the Pwns" | Ed Skudder & Zack Keller | Ed Skudder & Zack Keller | March 24, 2011 |
Red and Blue lead their galactic armadas in an all-out war against one another as the culmination of an argument over Red eating the last microwavable burrito.

=== Season 2 (2011) ===
| No. overall | No. in season | Title | Directed by | Written by | Original release date |
|---|---|---|---|---|---|
| 11 | 1 | "Zombies & Shotguns" | Ed Skudder & Zack Keller | Ed Skudder & Zack Keller | April 21, 2011 |
Red and Blue are visiting their local mall as Red wants to use a shotgun to open his bag of chips after failing to do so for a week. Whilst there, the pair are attacked by bloodthirsty zombies after an outbreak caused by cinnamon buns occurs. First appearance of Broseph.
| 12 | 2 | "Camp Anarchy" | Ed Skudder & Zack Keller | Ed Skudder & Zack Keller | May 5, 2011 |
Due to it being the only available job on Craigslist, Red and Blue become camp councillors for the summer. Blue is traditional in his approach towards the children, whereas Red teaches his group of campers how to become anarchists. Later on, Sasquatch attacks the camp, but Red and the other campers easily subdue him.
| 13 | 3 | "Butt Genie" | Ed Skudder & Zack Keller | Ed Skudder & Zack Keller | May 19, 2011 |
Red and Blue's hamster Flufferz dies after defecating out a magic lamp. A genie then promises Red and Blue one wish each for every wish they give to other people.
| 14 | 4 | "Lord Tourette's Syndrome" | Ed Skudder & Zack Keller | Ed Skudder & Zack Keller | June 2, 2011 |
Lord Tourettes shows up at Red and Blue's apartment promising them treasure in exchange for helping him find his missing hat, which grants him the ability to swear. After they fail to find the hat on a street, at a church and under a hat factory, Red and Blue eventually discover a mall Santa wearing it, much to Blue’s chagrin as it is the middle of summer.
| 15 | 5 | "Fang Angels" | Ed Skudder & Zack Keller | Ed Skudder & Zack Keller | June 16, 2011 |
A bored Blue is stuck with Pink watching her favourite film Fang Angels (a parody of Twilight). Blue then takes a phone call from an incarcerated Red, who believes he is talking to Stacy.
| 16 | 6 | "Captain Red Rum & the Pina Colada Armada" | Ed Skudder & Zack Keller | Ed Skudder & Zack Keller | June 30, 2011 |
Red and Blue, now pirates on the high seas, search for a mermaid and wage war on a ship captained by Pink.
| 17 | 7 | "Y U So Meme?" | Ed Skudder & Zack Keller | Ed Skudder & Zack Keller | July 14, 2011 |
Sick and tired of constantly being beaten at Flame War by a griefer called Trollz0r (Jason), Red enlists Blue's aid in tracking him down. After discovering he lives next door to them and that he owns a lot of sci-fi memorabilia, Blue decides to hang out with Trollz0r, prompting a jealous Red to try and win Blue back. First appearance of Trollz0r.
| 18 | 8 | "Sex Marks the Spot" | Ed Skudder & Zack Keller | Ed Skudder & Zack Keller | July 28, 2011 |
Red finds a treasure map whilst dealing with a clogged toilet, prompting him and Blue go on an Indiana Jones-esque adventure in search of bounty. Eventually, it is revealed that the treasure is merely Red's Victorian era pornography.
| 19 | 9 | "We're Cops!" | Ed Skudder & Zack Keller | Ed Skudder & Zack Keller | August 11, 2011 |
Red discovers a vacant police car on a street, so he and Blue take it for a joyride. Eventually, the duo discover they can obtain free goodies such as beer, pizza and medicinal marijuana under the alias of police officers, so they attempt to keep up the ruse for as long as possible.
| 20 | 10 | "Bath Rhymes" | Ed Skudder & Zack Keller | Ed Skudder & Zack Keller | August 25, 2011 |
In this multiple-animator music video, Red goes to a club and scores with multiple prostitutes.

=== Season 3 (2011–2012) ===
| No. overall | No. in season | Title | Directed by | Written by | Original release date |
|---|---|---|---|---|---|
| 21 | 1 | "Adventures of Batman & the Bloser" | Ed Skudder & Zack Keller | Ed Skudder & Zack Keller | September 22, 2011 |
Red and Blue, now superheroes known as Batman and The Bloser, battle Earl Grey, an upper-class English supervillain attempting to rid the world of colour.
| 22 | 2 | "Real Dudes Bros Night Man" | Ed Skudder & Zack Keller | Ed Skudder & Zack Keller | October 6, 2011 |
An argument during a poker night prompts a contest among Red, Blue, Lord Tourettes, the Raccoon, Mr. Dinkleberry and Broseph to see who is the "manliest" based on stories they tell one another. Lord Tourettes ultimately emerges victorious after his tale of the time he ate a bear alive.
| 23 | 3 | "Terminate-Her" | Ed Skudder & Zack Keller | Ed Skudder & Zack Keller | October 20, 2011 |
Red gets too in character whilst dressed as a Terminator at a Halloween event and attempts to find and assassinate Sarah Connor.
| 24 | 4 | "Modern Flame War 3" | Ed Skudder & Zack Keller | Ed Skudder & Zack Keller | November 3, 2011 |
The internet crashes worldwide right before Blue and Trollz0r can begin playing Modern Flame War 3. Red, who is struggling to find the perfect pair of breasts online, is also not happy about this, so the trio head to the internet headquarters in an attempt to fix it.
| 25 | 5 | "Planet Asshole" | Ed Skudder & Zack Keller | Ed Skudder & Zack Keller | November 17, 2011 |
Red and Blue give a tour of their town to two aliens called Der & Eulb who have taken a liking to burritos. Red and Blue proceed to trick the aliens into sticking their faces into toilets and jumping in front of cars on a busy highway.
| 26 | 6 | "Zeusbag" | Ed Skudder & Zack Keller | Ed Skudder & Zack Keller | December 1, 2011 |
In Ancient Greece, Red and Blue attempt to scale Mount Olympus to discuss complaints with Zeus. During their travels, they contend with multiple obstacles, such as a gladiator fight with the Raccoon, and Medusa. When they reach the top, Red and Blue are challenged to a drinking game by Zeus himself, which ends with all three getting drunk.
| 27 | 7 | "Chug-A-Chug-A-Brew-Brew" | Ed Skudder & Zack Keller | Ed Skudder & Zack Keller | December 15, 2011 |
Red and Blue visit a Wild West saloon whilst on a pub crawl. Red takes offence to a barkeeper serving him non-alcoholic beer, which prompts a shootout that destroys every bottle of alcohol in the saloon. Still craving a drink, Red and Blue set out to rob an alcohol train.
| 28 | 8 | "Brain Switch" | Ed Skudder & Zack Keller | Ed Skudder & Zack Keller | December 29, 2011 |
Blue is on his way to a job interview when he and Red are simultaneously struck by lightning, causing them to switch brains. Red makes a fool of himself in the interview, which angers Blue, so he and Blue vow to ruin each other's bodies.
| 29 | 9 | "Pleasure Cruise" | Ed Skudder & Zack Keller | Ed Skudder & Zack Keller | January 12, 2012 |
Red and Blue are on holiday on a cruise ship when they are mistaken for secret agents Crimson Tide and Blue Whale by a member of the Directorate General for External Security. Learning that a terrorist attack is planned to happen on the cruise, Red and Blue inspect the ship's cargo hold and find a nuclear weapon planted by Earl Grey's sole surviving henchman.
| 30 | 10 | "Kung Fu Winners" | Ed Skudder & Zack Keller | Ed Skudder & Zack Keller | January 26, 2012 |
Blue and Pink visit Chinatown, where Blue attempts to enter a restaurant reserved for "Kung Fu Winners" only. Consequently, Pink is kidnapped by ninjas, so Blue enlists the aid of Red in rescuing her.

=== Season 4 (2012) ===
| No. overall | No. in season | Title | Directed by | Written by | Original release date |
|---|---|---|---|---|---|
| 31 | 1 | "Losing Streakers" | Ed Skudder & Zack Keller | Ed Skudder & Zack Keller | April 5, 2012 |
Red and Blue go to Sal Sagev with intentions to win rent money at a casino. They lose almost everything at the casino and end up getting banned after Red defecates on a craps table. Eventually, Red ends up winning a lot of cash from a slot machine after talking to it with his auto-tuned voice.
| 32 | 2 | "Pussy Magnet" | Ed Skudder & Zack Keller | Ed Skudder & Zack Keller | April 19, 2012 |
Blue asks Red for help on his strained relationship with Pink.
| 33 | 3 | "Taco Tuesday" | Ed Skudder & Zack Keller | Ed Skudder & Zack Keller | May 3, 2012 |
After failing to pay their bill at an Italian restaurant, Red and Blue are forced to make pizzas and deliver them to a brothel. Whilst doing so, Red slices his hand open with a pizza cutter and commits multiple acts of vehicular manslaughter.
| 34 | 4 | "Ocho Muerte" | Ed Skudder & Zack Keller | Ed Skudder & Zack Keller | May 17, 2012 |
Blue gets locked out of the apartment while Pink is around for a date. Meanwhile, Red's pet octopus breaks out of its tank and terrorises Pink.
| 35 | 5 | "First Day of Cool" | Ed Skudder & Zack Keller | Ed Skudder & Zack Keller | May 31, 2012 |
In this preview of Dick Figures: The Movie, Blue meets Red for the first time after Red saves him from some school bullies on the playground.
| 36 | 6 | "The Red Devil" | Ed Skudder & Zack Keller | Ed Skudder & Zack Keller | June 14, 2012 |
Blue falls asleep while Red is driving his car and wakes up to discover Red has accidentally driven them to Mexico. After Blue's car and wallet are stolen by some local thugs and an eagle, Red is mistaken for the dangerous crime boss Diablo Rojo. Red and Blue are then taken to a warehouse where a burrito smuggling operation is being conducted, leading to a violent gang shootout.
| 37 | 7 | "Freshman 15" | Ed Skudder & Zack Keller | Ed Skudder & Zack Keller | June 28, 2012 |
Red and Blue (who is suffering from a bad fever) attend a college blowout party so Red can attempt the "Freshman 15" challenge (having sex with fifteen freshman college girls in one night).
| 38 | 8 | "The Ballad of Lord Tourettes" | Ed Skudder & Zack Keller | Ed Skudder & Zack Keller | July 5, 2012 |
Lord Tourettes sings about the first time he had sex to Red and Blue.
| 39 | 9 | "The Fart Knight Rises" | Ed Skudder & Zack Keller | Ed Skudder & Zack Keller | July 12, 2012 |
Batman and The Bloser thwart Earl Grey's attempts to disrupt the London Olympic Games.
| 40 | 10 | "Robot Frog" | Ed Skudder & Zack Keller | Ed Skudder & Zack Keller | August 2, 2012 |
Blue is nervous as his girlfriend has requested "a talk" with him. When he meets her, she reveals she is dumping him to focus on getting drunk and partying as she is fed up with medical school. However, it is revealed that Blue's girlfriend is actually Stacy. Meanwhile, Red observes a fight between the Racoon and a robot frog and ends up swallowing a bee that gives him an auto-tuned voice. A post credits scene reveals this episode happens mere hours before the first episode "A Bee or Something".

=== Dick Figures: The Movie (2013) ===
Dick Figures: The Movie was released on September 17, 2013. On the same day, it was split into twelve different chapters and released weekly on YouTube. The full movie can be seen now for online streaming on Yekra, Amazon, Hulu, and Netflix, and can be purchased for digital download through iTunes, Google Play, Vudu, PlayStation Network, and Xbox.

| No. | Title | Directed by | Written by | Original release date |
|---|---|---|---|---|
| 1 | "Growing Pains" | Ed Skudder & Zack Keller | Ed Skudder & Zack Keller | September 17, 2013 |
| 2 | "Gettin' Mah Quest On" | Ed Skudder & Zack Keller | Ed Skudder & Zack Keller | September 24, 2013 |
| 3 | "Japan Is Crazy" | Ed Skudder & Zack Keller | Ed Skudder & Zack Keller | October 1, 2013 |
| 4 | "Temple of Takagami" | Ed Skudder & Zack Keller | Ed Skudder & Zack Keller | October 8, 2013 |
| 5 | "The Mast & the Furious" | Ed Skudder & Zack Keller | Ed Skudder & Zack Keller | October 15, 2013 |
| 6 | "Captain Crookygrin" | Ed Skudder & Zack Keller | Ed Skudder & Zack Keller | October 22, 2013 |
| 7 | "Gin & Jetpacks" | Ed Skudder & Zack Keller | Ed Skudder & Zack Keller | October 29, 2013 |
| 8 | "Café Tourettes" | Ed Skudder & Zack Keller | Ed Skudder & Zack Keller | November 5, 2013 |
| 9 | "Baguette Away" | Ed Skudder & Zack Keller | Ed Skudder & Zack Keller | November 12, 2013 |
| 10 | "Red & Blue Adieu" | Ed Skudder & Zack Keller | Ed Skudder & Zack Keller | November 19, 2013 |
| 11 | "Animality" | Ed Skudder & Zack Keller | Ed Skudder & Zack Keller | November 26, 2013 |
| 12 | "Cuz We're Awesome" | Ed Skudder & Zack Keller | Ed Skudder & Zack Keller | December 2, 2013 |

=== Season 5 (2013–2014) ===
Season 5's release and production was subject to two large hiatuses. Due to the production of the movie, season 5's production was put on hold until after the movie was done so there was a one-year gap between the end of season 4 and the beginning of season 5. A hiatus also occurred between episodes 3 and 4 due to both the weekly release of the movie starting on September 17, 2013, and the crew taking a break from the year-long production of the movie. Regular release of the season resumed in April 2014.

As well as being released on YouTube for free viewing, the season was also available to buy in advance to the YouTube release.

| No. overall | No. in season | Title | Directed by | Written by | Original release date |
|---|---|---|---|---|---|
| 41 | 1 | "GTA: Pacific Grim" | Ed Skudder & Zack Keller | Ed Skudder & Zack Keller | August 27, 2013 |
Red and Blue visit their local mall and decide to play a demo of the new Grand Theft Auto game, unaware that it controls a giant robot in their city.
| 42 | 2 | "Hardcore Chore" | Ed Skudder & Zack Keller | Ed Skudder & Zack Keller | September 3, 2013 |
Red loses a bet to Blue after he fails to stop swearing for a minute. As a result, Red has to do Blue's chores for the day and he carries them out in the most violent way possible. Meanwhile, Blue enjoys his newfound free time.
| 43 | 3 | "Snowjob" | Ed Skudder & Zack Keller | Ed Skudder & Zack Keller | September 10, 2013 |
A snowstorm causes a power outage and freezes a drunk Red into a snowman. The following day, Red wakes up with a strong desire to urinate, and Blue and Pink are his only hope of getting free of his snowy prison.
| 44 | 4 | "Dick Figures: The Movie: The Song" | Ed Skudder & Zack Keller | Ed Skudder & Zack Keller | April 3, 2014 |
Another multiple animator music video to the song Dick Figures: The Movie: The Song, performed by Ninja Sex Party.
| 45 | 5 | "The Red Planet" | Ed Skudder & Zack Keller | Ed Skudder & Zack Keller | April 17, 2014 |
After winning a free vacation as a cereal box prize, Red and Blue mistakenly board a rocket ship bound for Mars. When they arrive, they must deal with the annoying and violent Mars Rover.
| 46 | 6 | "A Hobbit of Thrones" | Ed Skudder & Zack Keller | Ed Skudder & Zack Keller | May 1, 2014 |
Red, Blue, Stacy and Pink play Dungeons & Dragons, but Blue's ideal game environment is ruined by Pink and Stacy getting high on weed brownies.
| 47 | 7 | "Das Vidiamond" | Ed Skudder & Zack Keller | Ed Skudder & Zack Keller | May 15, 2014 |
The Russian Mafia trap Red and Blue in a trash compactor and threaten to kill them unless they reveal the whereabouts of a bottle of Das Vidiamond vodka.
| 48 | 8 | "Trash God" | Ed Skudder & Zack Keller | Ed Skudder & Zack Keller | May 29, 2014 |
Red and Blue suffer an ant infestation in their apartment, and the Racoon accidentally shrinks them to ant size. After discovering he was responsible for the pile of trash, the ant colony worship Red as their "trash God".
| 49 | 9 | "Chick Figures" | Ed Skudder & Zack Keller | Ed Skudder & Zack Keller | June 19, 2014 |
Lavender and Scarlet head round to Lavender's boyfriend Salmon's apartment for his birthday party, which ends with Scarlet blowing the place up and triggering Salmon's sprinkler system.
| 50 | 10 | "Happy Birthdump" | Ed Skudder & Zack Keller | Ed Skudder & Zack Keller | July 10, 2014 |
Red and Blue suffer food poisoning from a Mexican restaurant. After Blue's car is stolen they must make a long and painful journey home to the toilet.
| 51 | 11 | "Figured Out" | Ed Skudder & Zack Keller | Ed Skudder & Zack Keller | March 27, 2014 (download) |
An epilogue to the series that reveals Red and Blue's future lives.

=== Messin' with Sasquatch (2015) ===
| No. overall | No. in season | Title | Directed by | Written by | Original release date |
|---|---|---|---|---|---|
| 52 | 1 | "New Kid" | Ed Skudder & Zack Keller | Ed Skudder & Zack Keller | October 4, 2015 |
| 53 | 2 | "Camp Fight" | Ed Skudder & Zack Keller | Ed Skudder & Zack Keller | October 18, 2015 |
| 54 | 3 | "Wild Kingdom" | Ed Skudder & Zack Keller | Ed Skudder & Zack Keller | November 8, 2015 |
