= Ed Skudder =

American animator (born 1986)

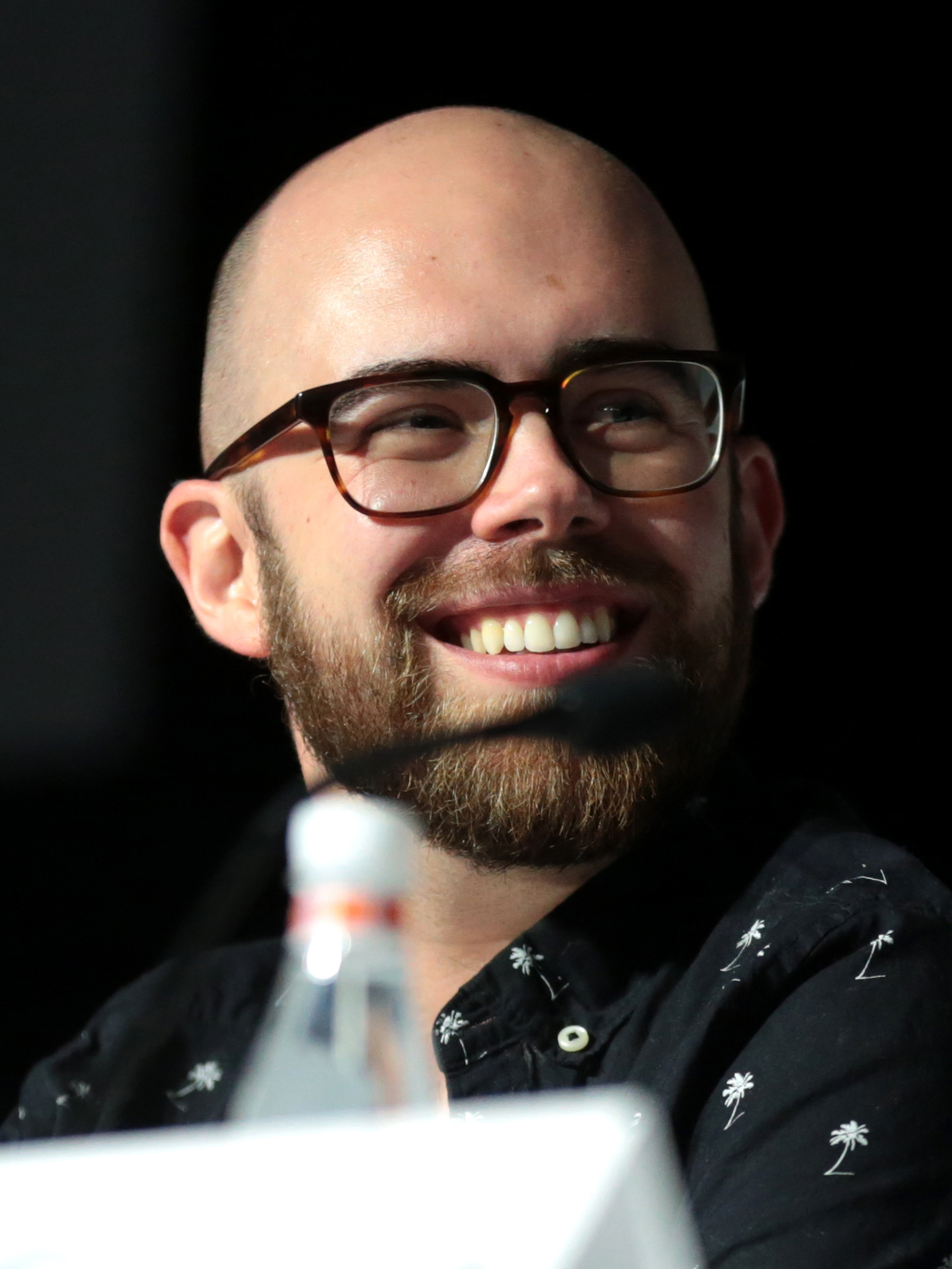
- Skudder at WonderCon in 2018
- Born: Edward Daniel Skudder; May 26, 1986 (age 40); Los Angeles, California, U.S.
- Occupations: Animator; storyboard artist; filmmaker; musician; voice actor
- Years active: 2003–present
- Notable credits: Dick Figures; Dick Figures: The Movie; Unikitty!; The Super Mario Bros. Movie
- Website: edskudder.com

Edward Daniel Skudder (born May 26, 1986) is an American animator, storyboard artist, filmmaker, musician, and voice actor. He is known for his work at Illumination as the head of story on the film The Super Mario Bros. Movie. He was the showrunner for the Cartoon Network animated series Unikitty!, the co-creator of the web series Dick Figures, and the co-director and co-writer of its Kickstarter-funded feature film Dick Figures: The Movie, alongside best friend and former business partner Zack Keller, both of them voicing main characters Red and Blue respectively.

== Early life ==
Skudder started his college years at the USC School of Cinematic Arts to study cinematography and film/video production from 2005 to 2008.

== Career ==
Skudder started his career as an animator at the animation studio, 6 Point Harness. While he was working on different projects, he was co-developing a web series for Mondo Media with Zack Keller called Dick Figures. When the first episode was released on YouTube, it was met with massive success and eventually became the most viewed web series on the site. Skudder and Keller would subsequently produce 49 additional episodes. Skudder served as a voice actor for Red, Raccoon, and Mr. Dingleberry in the series.

Due to its success, Skudder and Keller created a Kickstarter to fund the feature-length film based on the series, Dick Figures: The Movie (the first feature-length animated production by Mondo Media and 6 Point Harness). It was known for being one of the most popular animated projects being funded through Kickstarter at that time.

After Dick Figures ended in 2015, Skudder went on to work for Disney Television Animation's Pickle and Peanut, as a writer for one episode and as a storyboard artist for two of its episodes. Afterwards, Skudder worked as a creative director in animation at GoldieBlox.

In 2015, he co-created two animated web series with Lynn Wang for SpindoTV, titled Kicko Puncho Rhino and Power Gloves, both of which premiered on YouTube. After their conclusion, Skudder worked for Nickelodeon where he co-created, co-directed, and co-written the short film, Space Mission: Danger with Wang for the 2015 Nickelodeon Animated Shorts Program.

In 2017, Skudder was brought in to work with Warner Bros. Animation as a writer, director, and storyboard artist for an episode of Teen Titans Go!, and would later work with The Lego Group with Wang to co-develop the Cartoon Network animated series Unikitty!. They both worked as producers for seasons 1 and 2, then co-executive producers for the third season. Skudder was also a singer and songwriter for the shows accompanying soundtrack.

Skudder was head of story on Illumination's The Super Mario Bros. Movie in 2023. He also made prop and EFX designs for The Cuphead Show! as well as freelance storyboards for Thelma the Unicorn.

In 2024, he formed a punk rock band called Tropic Waste. Their first single Malibu was released on August 8, 2024.

He voices R.O.B. in The Super Mario Galaxy Movie.

== Filmography ==
=== Feature films ===
Year	Title	Role	Notes
2008	Cranberry Christmas		Animator
2010	The Drawn Together Movie: The Movie!		Animator
2013	Dick Figures: The Movie	Red, Raccoon (Papa-san), Mr. Dinkleberry, Additional voices	Also co-director, co-writer, executive producer, animator
2014	Aachi & Ssipak	Aachi, additional voices	Also co-director and co-writer (English dub only)
2019	Invader Zim: Enter the Florpus		Animator: Florpus sequence
2023	The Super Mario Bros. Movie		Head of Story
2024	Thelma the Unicorn		Storyboard artist
2026	The Super Mario Galaxy Movie	R.O.B.	Head of Story
TBA	A Newgrounds Documentary: Once Upon a Time on the Internet	Himself	

=== Short films ===
Year	Title	Role	Notes
2007	Magnificent Max		Production assistant
2008	8 Ball		Concept Artist
2013	Solstice		Co-director, animator, composer
2014	Jinxy Jenkins, Lucky Lou	Jinky	

=== Television ===
Year	Title	Role	Notes
2007	Revisioned: Tomb Raider		Animator
2007	El Tigre: The Adventures of Manny Rivera		Animator
2007	Slacker Cats		Animator
2007	Class of 3000		Animator
2010–2015	Dick Figures	Red, Raccoon, Mr. Dingleberry, Additional Voices	Also creator
2012	Duke of Fancy	Additional voices	
2012	Suck Tower	The Monster	Also animator
2013	SuperFuckers	Pink Arrow	
2013	Story War	Gremlin	
2015	Like, Share, Die	Various voices	Also co-director and co-writer
2015	Pickle and Peanut		Writer, storyboard artist
2015	Crash Zoom	Pervert Pal #2	
2016	Space Mission: Danger!	Orbot the Robot	Also co-creator
2017	Teen Titans Go!		Director
2017–2020	Unikitty!		Creator, developer, showrunner, co-executive producer
2022	The Cuphead Show!		Prop designer and EFX designer
