= Alex and Lindsay Small-Butera =

American husband and wife animating duo

- Born: Alexander Butera; January 29, 1986 (age 40) Lindsay Caroline Small; September 16, 1985 (age 41)
- Education: Massachusetts College of Art and Design
- Occupations: Animators, writers, voice actors
- Years active: 2009-present

Alexander Small-Butera (born January 29, 1986) and Lindsay Caroline Small-Butera (born September 16, 1985), sometimes collectively referred to as SMALLBÜ, are an American husband and wife animating duo. They are best known for creating the long-running web series Baman Piderman. They have also famously worked on Adventure Time and helped co-develop the video game Later Alligator.

== Biography ==
Alexander Butera and Lindsay Small met at Massachusetts College of Art and Design. They collaborated on a homework assignment to create a short film for the Ottawa International Animation Festival in Canada. The result was the surreal animated comedy Baman Piderman. The short was released online where it became a hit. Following this, they launched a Kickstarter campaign to have a full web series developed. Mondo Media eventually bought the series for their YouTube channel. Initially, Alex was the sole person working on the shorts, but after showing the third episode to Lindsay, she stated that it was "the worst thing [she] had ever seen." Alex asked her to become the writer for the series. She had refused at first, but since then all of their work had been equally divided between the two. Alex started working on the series WordGirl while Lindsay worked as a designer for Converse before working at Hero4Hire Creative animation.

They did guest work on the long running Cartoon Network series Adventure Time. Lindsay Small-Butera earned an Emmy Award for her work on the episode "Ketchup". In 2019, they helped create the animation for the point-and-click indie game Later Alligator which took "80,000 cels" to animate. In 2021, they did guest work on the Disney Channel series Amphibia. In May 2026, they created a 2D animated ad for Glitch Productions' web series Gameoverse.

== Influences ==
Alex was influenced by popular anime such as Ghost in the Shell, Cowboy Bebop and FLCL, while Lindsay has cited UPA as her source of inspiration along with classic '50s animation.

== Filmography ==
Acting roles
Year	Title	Alex	Lindsay	Notes
2009–2015	Baman Piderman	Baman / Piderman	Wanda	Webseries
2013	Story War	Goblin / Skywhale	Fairy	Short film
2017	Here's the Plan	Doug	Kat	Short film
2020–present	Bigtop Burger	Conrad	Penny	Webseries
2022	Happyland Incorporated	Additional voices		Pilot

Animation roles
Year	Title	Alex	Lindsay	Notes
2009–2015	Baman Piderman	Yes	Yes	Alex directed, wrote, composed and edited Lindsay wrote
2009–2014	WordGirl	Yes	No	Alex also storyboarded
2013	Mappy	Yes	Yes	
2013	Dick Figures	Yes	Yes	Episode: "Snowjob"
2013	Dick Figures: The Movie	Yes	Yes	
2013	The Awesomes	Yes	No	Episode: "The Super-Hero Awards"
2013	Story War	Yes	Yes	Short film; Lindsay directed and wrote Alex storyboarded
2015	Good Thinking! The Science of Teaching Science	Yes	Yes	
2015	Clarence	Yes	Yes	Episode: "Tuckered Boys"
2016–2017	Adventure Time	Yes	Yes	Episode: "Beyond the Grotto"; Episode: "Ketchup"
2019	Later Alligator	Yes	Yes	Video game
2020	Stinkoman 20X6	Yes	Yes	Video game; Intro only
2021	Amphibia	Yes	Yes	Episode: "True Colors"
2022	Happyland Incorporated	Yes	Yes	Pilot; also co-wrote and sound designed Lindsay directed
2023	The Owl House	Yes	Yes	Episode: "Watching and Dreaming"
2023	Adventure Time: Fionna and Cake	Yes	Yes	Episode: "The Winter King"
2024	Smiling Friends	Yes	Yes	Episode: "A Allan Adventure"; Episode: "Charlie, Pim, and Bill vs. the Alien"
2025	Deltarune	Yes	Yes	Video game; Chapters 3 and 4
2026	Gameoverse	Yes	Yes	Pilot; rough animators
