= SuperFuckers =

2012 American animated TV series

- Cover of first comic book issue
- Genre: Comedy; Action; Adventure
- Created by: James Kochalka
- Based on: SuperFuckers by James Kochalka
- Written by: James Kochalka
- Directed by: Fran Krause
- Voices of: David Faustino; Phil Morris; James Kochalka; Ted Biaselli; Maria Bamford; Veronica Belmont; Justin Roiland; Jeff Bryan Davis; Jaleel White; Ed Skudder; Zack Keller
- Opening theme: "SuperFuckers" by James Kochalka
- Composers: Anthony Davis; James Kochalka; Dustin Pilkington
- Country of origin: United States
- No. of seasons: 1
- No. of episodes: 12

Production
- Executive producer: Fred Seibert
- Producers: Fran Krause; Kevin Kolde; Eric Homan
- Running time: 4-5 minutes
- Production companies: Frederator Studios; Top Shelf Productions; Bardel Entertainment; Kochalka Quality

Original release
- Network: Cartoon Hangover
- Release: November 30, 2012 – May 24, 2013

SuperFuckers (censored as SuperF#@%ers, SuperF*ckers or SuperF***ers) is an American adult animated web series created by James Kochalka and published by Top Shelf Productions between 2005 and 2007. The series revolves around a collection of crude and rude superheroes who never actually do any superhero work. A collection was published on May 18, 2010, including four issues along with a new Jack Krak one-shot. The first issue is numbered #271. An animated web series based on the comic, produced for Frederator Studios' Cartoon Hangover channel on YouTube, was streamed between November 30, 2012 and May 4, 2013.

== Characters ==
- Jack Krak (voiced by David Faustino) is the egotistical de facto leader of the SuperFuckers; he refers to himself as "the motherfucker". His two best friends are Ultra Richard and Shitstorm. His suit was originally black, but he later wears a new white costume upon his conversion to Christianity. Jack's superpower is throwing devastating super-charged punches.
- Ultra Richard (voiced by Phil Morris) is one of Jack's two best friends. He's immature, but also manages to be a suave gentleman. He has X-ray vision.
- Shitstorm (voiced by James Kochalka) is a piece of Jack's feces inhabiting a suit Wonder Kyle originally invented for Grotus that would translate his gurgling speech into English. Jack defecated into the suit, and the feces came to life as a new entity. Shitstorm has a loud, wild, and brash personality, and is addicted to partying.
- Grotessa (voiced by Veronica Belmont) is a somewhat rude superhero whose powers center around grossness. Her pet slime blob is Grotus. She hates having people insult Grotus. She's enemy roommates with Princess Sunshine. She is often mistreated by the other members because of her appearance and attitude. She has a crush on Vortex.
- Princess Sunshine (voiced by Maria Bamford) is a pretty, blonde-haired superhero whose powers are based around beauty. She's also Jack's love interest and Superdan's ex-girlfriend, though their relationship hasn't been specified. She hates Grotessa and Grotus because she finds them both to be disgusting and is annoyed by Computer Fist because of his crush on her.
- Grotus (voiced by James Kochalka) is Grotessa's pet slime blob. His slime has the effect of a hallucinogenic drug which the team has used to get high; it's this very drug that causes Jack to destroy the entire Earth under the influence of Grotus' slime in the finale of the web series, "Chug the Drug".
- Wonder Kyle (voiced by Ted Biaselli) is a very mature and smart member of the SuperFuckers. He speaks in an effeminate voice, and is a religious Christian who holds dear a framed photo of his grandmother - he never wants to be embarrassed in front of said photograph. Jack often assumes that Wonder Kyle is gay. Wonder Kyle is also an inventor, having built a suit for Grotus with a built-in translator, but Jack defecates into it, thus creating "Shitstorm".
- Computer Fist (voiced by Maria Bamford) is the SuperFuckers' new recruit. He wears metal computer gloves, which is why his name is "Computer Fist". He has a crush on Princess Sunshine and dreams of marrying her someday, however Ultra Richard has tried to make it clear to him that she won't ever like him. He used to be friends with Pink Arrow, Plant Pal and Rocket Power.
- Super Dan (voiced by Jeff B. Davis) is a blonde-haired superhero who has the power of invulnerability, who was the team's previous leader before he and his sidekick Percy were trapped in Dimension Zero; as a result of his invulnerability, he is unaffected by Dimension Zero's radiated atmosphere. He tends to be oblivious to what is going on around him, and typically pays no attention to whatever Percy says.
- Percy (voiced by Jaleel White) is Super Dan's neglected sidekick. Like Super Dan, he's also trapped in Dimension Zero, but because he is a normal human, he is constantly seen damaged by the atmosphere of Dimension Zero. His skin gradually burns off in "Burger Brothers" and "Dawn of Omnizod", but Super Dan doesn't give it much attention. In "Dawn of Omnizod", as a result of his skin burning off completely, he turns into Omnizod, a flaming skull. In the comics, it is said that Omnizod is a monster in Dimension Zero that took control of Percy's skull and haunts it.
- Orange Lightning (voiced by Justin Roiland) is a member of the SuperFuckers who has electricity powers. He is good friends with both Jack Krak and Ultra Richard.
- Vortex (voiced by Justin Roiland) is a nerdy, pessimistic, and sometimes apathetic member of the SuperFuckers who has the power to create portals in space-time. He doesn't wear a superhero costume, instead sporting street clothes; this is because he hates being on a superhero team. He's Grotessa's love interest and seems to reciprocate her feelings. In "Chug the Drug", he is guarding a Time Capsule that houses a contained universe that when let out could mean the end of the world, but a drugged Jack shatters it, causing the entire Earth to explode.
- Pink Arrow (voiced by Ed Skudder) is a hero with a pink haircut, a pink suit, and pink arrows. He wants to be a member of the SuperFuckers but doesn't seem to have a lot of luck getting in. He is envious of Computer Fist being accepted into the team, and attempts to kill him out of jealousy, but ends up shooting Jack with an arrow instead, sending him into a coma.
- Rocket Power (voiced by Zack Keller) is a male hero with a jet pack he uses "to fuck shit up and stuff". He has a short temper and has an implied rivalry with Radical Randy.
- Plant Pal (voiced by Phil Morris) is a "friend to plants" who wears a plant costume. His powers haven't been seen on screen, but it's implied by his name and background that he can manipulate plants.
- Radical Randy (voiced by Ron Robinson) is a male hero with yellow skin, yellow hair, and uses drugs to try to gain superpowers. In "Scrimple's Delight", he overdoses on the drug "xaxxax" and turns into a large, yellow, lumpy monster, then dismembers Rocket Power in a fit of rage.

== Media ==
=== Comic book series ===
An adult-rated comic book series created by James Kochalka and published by Top Shelf Productions between 2005 and 2007.

=== Animated series ===
An animated web series based on the books has been produced by Frederator Studios in collaboration with Top Shelf Productions and Bardel Entertainment for Cartoon Hangover. The series was streamed on YouTube in both censored and uncensored versions between November 30, 2012 and May 24, 2013. Pink Arrow and Rocket Power are voiced by the creators of Dick Figures.

==== Cast ====
- David Faustino as Jack Krak
- Phil Morris as Ultra Richard, Plant Pal
- Veronica Belmont as Grotessa
- Maria Bamford as Princess Sunshine, Computer Fist
- James Kochalka as Grotus, Shitstorm
- Ted Biaselli as Wonder Kyle
- Jaleel White as Percy / Omnizod
- Jeff B. Davis as Plant Pal, Super Dan
- Justin Roiland as Orange Lightning, Vortex
- Zack Keller as Rocket Power
- Ed Skudder as Pink Arrow
- Ron Robinson as Radical Randy
- Bailee DesRocher as Waitress

==== Episode list ====
No.	Title	Directed by	Written by	Original release date	Prod. code
1	"Sweet Mystery"	Fran Krause	James Kochalka	November 30, 2012	SF101
Jack has superpower-envy, Princess Sunshine charges her powers, Grotessa defends her best friend, and Ultra Richard explains the greatest mystery to ever confound the motherfucker.
2	"Shitstorm, MotherF*ckers"	Fran Krause	James Kochalka	December 7, 2012	SF102
When Wonder Kyle asks for Jack's opinion, he can't help but shit on a good idea. Wonder Kyle and Jack accidentally give birth to something awesome—or awful—it's too soon to tell.
3	"Crises on Infinite Toilets"	Fran Krause	James Kochalka	December 14, 2012	SF103
With the SuperF*ckers' bathrooms in deplorable conditions, Jack needs to find a solution and fast—before the rest of the team pins the blame on him. Meanwhile, potential new recruits are lining up for tryouts to join the team.
4	"Burger Brothers"	Fran Krause	James Kochalka	December 21, 2012	SF104
Super Dan and Percy are trapped in Dimension Zero without food, reception, and any hope of returning home. Meanwhile, back at the SuperF*ckers clubhouse, a new challenge faces Jack and Ultra Richard's friendship.
5	"Dawn of Omnizod"	Fran Krause	James Kochalka	April 5, 2013	SF105
Super Dan makes a new friend, Princess Sunshine reconnects with an old flame, and Percy learns the hard way that you never leave home without sandwiches.
6	"The Greatest Story Ever Told"	Fran Krause	James Kochalka	April 12, 2013	SF106
When Jack encounters a problem as he sets out to write his autobiography, he finds comfort in an unexpected place.
7	"Cute Rump"	Fran Krause	James Kochalka	April 19, 2013	SF107
Princess Sunshine and Grotessa argue about Grotus and whether or not Grotessa is lovable. Meanwhile, the boys harass Vortex who just wants to lay down on the couch and die.
8	"Big Ambition"	Fran Krause	James Kochalka	April 26, 2013	SF108
Princess Sunshine wants her boyfriend to be a real man, so Jack sets out on a quest of self-discovery and party-bombing to do just that. Ultra Richard continues to be ultra-insightful.
9	"Scrimples Delight"	Fran Krause	James Kochalka	May 3, 2013	SF109
Committed to impressing Princess Sunshine, Jack whisks her away to Scrimples for a romantic dinner. But when young SuperF*ckers-hopefuls arrive and get into an argument, they serve up a shitty meal for Jack and Sunshine.
10	"The Hero's Destiny"	Fran Krause	James Kochalka	May 10, 2013	SF110
While fantasizing about his ideal role on the team, Computer Fist receives advice from Ultra Richard about how to make the most of his super power. And with a concussing conclusion you can't miss.
11	"Sweet Baby Jesus"	Fran Krause	James Kochalka	May 17, 2013	SF111
After Jack's near-death experience, he has a strange dream about Baby Jesus. Meanwhile, Ultra Richard asks the biggest question of the season.
12	"Chug the Drug"	Fran Krause	James Kochalka	May 24, 2013	SF112
Ultra Richard and Orange Lightning help Jack find a new appreciation for everyone's favorite slime ball, Grotus. Meanwhile, Vortex must fix his Time Capsule before Jack's elbow ruins everything forever.

== Reception ==
NYCGraphicNovelists reviewer Jared Gniewek states "SuperFuckers tends to feel disjointed and chaotic. Almost a stream of consciousness. On this level the book is solid and rewarding (and pretty funny)." Chris Sims of ComicsAlliance says it's one of the funniest comics he's ever read.
