= Aachi & Ssipak =

2006 South Korean animated film

- Theatrical poster
- Hangul: 아치와 씨팍
- RR: Achiwa ssipak
- MR: Ach'iwa ssip'ak
- Directed by: Joe Bum-jin
- Written by: Kang Sang-kyun; Jeong Hye-won; Jo Beom-jin
- Produced by: Kim Seon-ku; Park Se-jun
- Starring: Ryoo Seung-bum; Im Chang-jung; Hyun Young
- Cinematography: Lee Chung-bok
- Edited by: Kim Yun-gi; Seo Dong-hyeon; Park Han-jae
- Music by: Kang Ki-young
- Production company: JTeam Studios
- Distributed by: Studio 2.0
- Release date: June 28, 2006
- Running time: 90 minutes
- Country: South Korea
- Language: Korean
- Budget: US$3 million

Aachi & Ssipak is a 2006 South Korean adult animated comic science fiction action film directed by Jo Beom-jin and featuring the voices of Ryoo Seung-bum, Im Chang-jung, and Hyun Young.

== Plot ==
Somewhere in the future, mankind has depleted all energy and fuel sources, however they have somehow engineered a way to use human excrement as fuel. People started to build the new city by making new energy with their excrement. Soon after, the city's leaders announced two legislations to generate and control the new energy; including installing ID chips in each citizens' anus to monitor the defecation level; providing an addictive juicybar to citizens in return. Soon enough, defecation amounts have skyrocketed and the city becomes full of addicts, due to juicybar's strong addictive qualities. An illegal juicybar trade becomes prevalent and its side effects has created dumb pint-sized mutants. The mutants later organize a gang, plundering juicybars, later becoming known as the Diaper Gang.

Section 4 travels back to the city (filled with juicybars), with police officers in their motorcycles for protection until the Diaper Gang hijacks it and kills everyone, they initially succeed until they are intercepted by police android Geko, who slaughters the Diaper Gang members. Once all gone, Aachi and Ssipak return to the city. Aachi and Ssipak are street hoodlums who struggle to survive by trading black market Juicybars. Through a chain of events involving their porn-director acquaintance Jimmy the Freak, they meet a porn star named Beautiful, who gets a pink ring inside her butt which makes her defecations rewarded by exceptional quantities of Juicybars. For that reason, Beautiful is persuaded by Aachi and Sspipak to stay with them, acting as her manager (Aachi) and her bodyguard/lover (Ssipak). Meanwhile, the Diaper Gang's leader, The Diaper King, unimpressed by Jimmy for failing to secure Beautiful for him, murders him.

Together, the three become juicy bar tycoons, making their way to the top of the juicy bar trade, even exceeding the organized gangs that they once worked for. Eventually, both the Diaper Gang, and the city's police force, find out about Beautiful's involvement with Aachi and Ssipak, and go to intercept her. At the same time, Beautiful makes a deal with the organized gangs to cut out both of them in exchange for a larger share. The three separate groups all attack the trio at once, and a firefight ensues, resulting the deaths of the organized gang, and a massive bike chase throughout the city. The three are eventually intercepted by Geko, who apprehends beautiful and slaughters many of the Diaper Gang's members, but fails to kill the Diaper King, who distracts him with a decoy long enough to kill him.

Without Geko to help enforce the city's police, and an unknown traitor assisting them, the Diaper Gang takes over the city, and Aachi and Ssipak have a falling out. The two go their separate ways, with Aachi returning to his life as a street hoodlum (and failing without Ssipak), and Ssipak going after Beautiful on his own. The city's child-like police chief has the insane doctor who created Geko rebuild him, while Aachi and Ssipak reunite to try and find Beautiful. While Geko is undergoing his repairs, The Diaper King recruits the doctor to join his side, and kills the police chief's treacherous second in command, who betrayed the chief in favor of the Diaper Gang.

A final battle begins in the desert, where an upgraded Geko destroys much of the landscape with a powerful torpedo. The police chief is hunted down and killed by the Diaper King's new cyborg minions, and Aachi and Ssipak go after the Diaper King to rescue Beautiful, resulting in a mine chase. While they initially fail, the duo is able to intercept the Diaper King just as he prepares to cut out Beautiful's anal ring. A fight ensues, and Ssipak is shot, but before the Diaper King can escape with Beautiful, Geko intercepts him, and it is revealed that he was rebuilt with Jimmy's body. The fighting destabilizes the hideout, and Geko, not wanting to die alone, activates a chest bomb just as Jimmy's consciousness retakes control of his body. Jimmy and the Diaper King fall to their deaths, and Aachi and Ssipak escape with Beautiful.

Without the Diaper Gang, gangsters, or the police to stop them, the trio return to the city, confident that they will now rule the city without any more competition. In the original South Korean ending, the doctor was revealed to have survived and began making a new cyborg from the corpses of the Diaper King and police chief, but this was cut from the American re-release.

== Cast ==
- Ryoo Seung-bum as Aachi, one of main protagonists, a hoodlum who struggles to survive by trading Juicybars. In the English version, he is voiced by Ed Skudder.
- Im Chang-jung as Ssipak, one of main protagonists, a hoodlum who struggles to survive by trading Juicybars and falls in love with Beautiful. In the English version, he is voiced by Zack Keller.
- Hyun Young as Beautiful, one of main protagonists, a wannabe-actress who is wanted by the Diaper Gang and the police after Jimmy puts another chip to her butt, and can gush out thousands of Juicybars.
- Shin Hae-chul as Diaper King, the main antagonist, mutated king and leader of the illegal clan, Diaper Gang
- Yang Jeong Hwa as Diaper Gang, hoodlums and mutated minions of Diaper King
- Seo Hye-jeong as Jimmy the Freak, a porn director who creates illegal movies, friends with Aachi and Ssipak
- Oh In-yong as Gangster, the boss of a gang until loses all the juicybars and gets his leg broken, goes revenge
- Lee Gyu-hwa as The Deputy, a special police officer and cyborg that can kill the Diaper Gang
- Lee Gyu-hyeong

== Production ==
The original story was proposed in 1998. To test different film techniques, demos using flash animation were made before attempting a theatrical version. In 2001, the flash animation versions of the film with four episodes were showcased in the 11th Yubari International Fantastic Film Festival. All six episodes premiered in an online theatre called cine4m with Aachi played by Ryoo Seung-bum and Ssipak played by Im Won-hee. The clip attracted three million hits, and the film was originally scheduled for release at the end of 2002. Ryoo Seung-bum later revealed that it was hard to voice act in the film. There were also news reports that a game would be developed by teaming up with game company ziointeractive, expecting the film would be released in May 2005. The team eventually delayed the release date of the film to November 2005. 3.5 billion won was spent to produce the film.

After animated films My Beautiful Girl, Mari and Wonderful Days flopped despite huge expectations, Jo's film ran into investor problems, and the production team halted working on the animation for almost a year. It would take a total of eight years for the feature-length film to be finished.

== Marketing ==
The film was marketed with interactive games and character merch such as t-shirts and in case of t-shirts, they were worn by celebrities such as Yoon Do-hyun and Shin dong yup. Albums were even released.

=== English dubbed version ===
Mondo Media hired Dick Figures creators Ed Skudder and Zack Keller to rewrite a version of the film for English-speaking audiences. It was released digitally on February 11, 2014, and the DVD and Blu-ray were released a month later on March 11. Four minutes were cut, and dubbed English voice acting and an entirely new soundtrack (a DJ-rap music score by Mad Decent's Kevin Seaton) were added.

== Release ==
Aachi & Ssipak opened in South Korean theaters on June 28, 2006. Like most of its predecessors in homegrown animation, it was well-reviewed, but a box office flop, with total ticket sales of 107,154. The film was invited to the 2007 36th International Film Festival Rotterdam.

In November 2020, the film was rereleased on theaters at Seoul Lotte cinema world tower joined by Nancy Lang.
