= Austin Madison =

American animator, artist, and voice actor

- Education: Sheldon High School
- Alma mater: California Institute of the Arts
- Occupations: animator, artist, voice actor
- Years active: 2002–present
- Employer: Pixar

Austin Madison is an American animator, artist, story artist, and voice actor who works at Pixar Animation Studios.

== Early life ==
After graduating from Sheldon High School in 2002, he attended the character animation program at the California Institute of the Arts; he graduated from there in 2006.

== Career ==
Ever since his 2006 graduation, Madison has worked as an animator and story artist for Pixar. He has also served as a voice actor on short films, and as a voice actor in Mondo Media's Dick Figures.

Madison has worked as an animator on several Pixar films, including Incredibles 2 (2018), Toy Story 3 (2010), Up (2009), WALL-E (2008), and Ratatouille (2007).

The most influential role he has had in his animation career was as the lead animator for the 2012 film Brave, which would go on to be the 13th-highest grossing film for that year. That film also won the Academy Award for Best Animated Feature at the 85th Academy Awards, and the Golden Globe Award for Best Animated Feature Film at the 70th Golden Globe Awards.

Madison created cartoon battle sketches that depicted real and current NFL football matchups extensively during the 2012 and 2013 seasons, and for a few games during the 2014 season. He did cartoon battle sketches for some playoff games in those three seasons also, including Super Bowl XLVII between the Baltimore Ravens and San Francisco 49ers, and Super Bowl XLVIII between the Denver Broncos and Seattle Seahawks.

Additionally, Madison serves as an instructor for The Animation Collaborative, an Emeryville, California premiere training workshop for animation and animation art serving the San Francisco Bay Area.

== Filmography ==
=== Film ===
Year	Title	Role	Notes
2007	Ratatouille		Animator
2008	WALL-E		Animator
2009	Calendar Confloption	WWI Veteran	Short film
2009	Trifles	Sheriff Peters	Short film
2009	Up		Animator
2010	Toy Story 3		Animator
2011	Horizon	Trooper	Short film
2011	La Luna		Animator, short film
2011	Cars 2		Animator
2012	Brave		Lead animator
2012	Adam and Dog		Animator, short film
2013	Monsters University		Animator
2014	Party Central	Additional voices	Story artist, short film
2018	Incredibles 2	Additional voices	Story artist
2019	Purl	Office Bro	Story trust
	Team Animate	Himself	Documentary

=== Television ===
Year	Title	Role	Notes
2011–2012	Dick Figures	Earl Grey	For two episodes
2013	Ultimate Spider-Man		Storyboard artist for one episode
2014	Toy Story That Time Forgot		story artist, short film
