= GameTap =

Online video game service

- The GameTap 2007–2009 desktop
- Developer: Metaboli (formerly Turner Broadcasting System)
- Operating system: Windows
- Type: Digital distribution
- License: Proprietary
- Website: gametap.com

GameTap was an online video game service established by Turner Broadcasting System (TBS) in 2005. It provided users with video games and game-related video content. The service was acquired by French online video game service Metaboli in 2008 as a wholly owned subsidiary; Metaboli aimed to create a global games service. The service remained active until October 2015, when it was shut down by Metaboli.

== Features ==
GameTap was conceived primarily as an online subscription rental service, competing against mail-based services like GameFly. GameTap offered two subscription levels: a Premium subscription with access to the entire content library, and a Classic subscription with access to older console and arcade games running in emulation. GameTap also sold games via the online distribution method. GameTap initially offered a limited selection of games for free play without a subscription, but this option was discontinued.

Originally, GameTap was designed to offer not only video games, but a complete media hub (GameTap TV), taking advantage of the TBS catalog as well as offering original video content, including the animated series Revisioned: Tomb Raider and new episodes of Space Ghost Coast to Coast. GameTap TV has since been discontinued.

Most multiplayer games can be played by two users on the same computer; many others not originally intended to be played outside of a LAN may be played over the internet by using a VPN client such as Hamachi. A limited number of games have been enhanced with an online leaderboard and challenge lobby, adding internet multiplayer to games that previously could only be played face to face. Every Monday GameTap holds a leaderboard tournament with a different game each week.

=== GameTap Originals ===
GameTap has funded the development of a number of titles, with the games subsequently premiering as GameTap exclusives. Such games include Sam & Max Season One and Myst Online: Uru Live.

On February 7, 2007, GameTap announced their third original game, Galactic Command: Echo Squad, from independent developer 3000AD. The four-part episodic game is a space combat title formerly planned for launch in the Summer of 2007. However, it suffered from constant delays, and in early 2008, GameTap announced that it had canceled its deal with 3000AD. "It was a good game, it was very solid, but as we were going through, it ended up not being the right title for our audience," says Ricardo Sanchez. "It was a tough call. I think it's one of the strongest games [Derek] ever made. We put a lot of effort into it...I honestly think it's one of Derek's strongest games."

On May 15, 2007, PC Gamer magazine premiered the first look at GameTap's newest original game, American McGee's Grimm, a 24 part episodic series by game designer American McGee.

== History ==
In April 2005, Atlanta-based Turner Broadcasting System (a subsidiary of Time Warner) announced that it would create a service that offer classic and newest video games, named GameTap.

GameTap launched on October 17, 2005, with over 300 games and grew to over 1,000. GameTap was the idea of Turner employee Blake Lewin. The initial list of game licensees included Activision, Atari, Intellivision Lives!, Midway, Namco, Sega, and Taito. After its inception, more companies licensed their software, including: Eidos Interactive, G-Mode, Ubisoft, Codemasters, Vivendi Games, Konami, Electronic Arts, Capcom, Take-Two Interactive, Interplay and SNK Playmore.

On May 1, 2007, GameTap revised its business model to utilize three different service levels: Visitor, Green, and Gold. The Visitor and Green levels were free, had access to a limited selection of games, and were supported by advertising. Green members registered with the site and received access to a few more games. Gold members were essentially identical to paid subscribers as before.

On November 29, 2007, GameTap announced that as of December 11, over 70 games would be removed from their catalog, many of them Electronic Arts or Interplay titles, likely due to expiration of the two-year licensing agreement with those companies.

On January 10, 2008, a GameTap staff member announced the return of the Humongous Entertainment license which restored popular games such as the likes of Putt Putt and Pajama Sam to the library.

On August 6, 2008, Turner Broadcasting announced it was looking to sell GameTap. On September 24, 2008, Time Warner sold the service to Paris-based Metaboli. Turner continued to handle GameTap's operations during the transition period, which lasted until 2009. After the transition, the service became available to non-US/Canadian residents.

On March 31, 2009, GameTap Player was replaced by the plug-in after saying goodbyes to their players, GameTap's business model was again changed - into a GameTap Plug-In; the service was then handled through the website. The subscription levels were changed to Free Pack (selected handful of games for free), a new Classic Pack (reduced-price version of the full service which does not include Windows games), and Premium Pack (the Gold membership). However, due to technical issues, many features offered previously were disabled during the migration. Users with 64-bit versions of Windows could only play games marked as 64-bit compatible. GameTap was working on encrypting the rest of its Windows catalog with Yummy encryption to make them 64-bit compatible.

On October 14, 2010, the American office of Metaboli was shut down and all operations moved to Paris, thus cutting all ties with original Turner employees.

== TV shows ==
GameTap released Revisioned: Tomb Raider in 2007 via the GameTap TV section of its website. The web series is a collection of ten short animated films that features reimagined versions of Croft by well-known animators, comic book artists, and writers, including Jim Lee, Warren Ellis, and Peter Chung.[107][108] Episodes ranged from five to seven and half minutes in length, featuring Minnie Driver as Croft. The creative staff was given considerable freedom to reinterpret the character; they did not consult the video game designers, but were given a guide listing acceptable and unacceptable practices. Gametap also released new episodes for the Cartoon Network/Adult Swim animated talk show Space Ghost Coast to Coast with George Lowe & C. Martin Croker reprising their roles as Space Ghost, Zorak & Moltar. The show ended when the video section of the website shutdown in 2008. Their final episode was Barenaked Ladies.

== Reception ==
GameTap was criticized for its cancellation process, which required customers to contact live support personnel; such calls were noted by reviewers to be deliberately protracted by support staff in an effort to retain subscribers.
