= The God & Devil Show =

American adult animated web series

- Genre: Black comedy
- Created by: Aubrey Ankrum
- Theme music composer: Jim Lively
- Country of origin: United States
- Original language: English
- No. of seasons: 1
- No. of episodes: 44

Production
- Producers: John Evershed; Liz Stuart
- Running time: 3-7 minutes
- Production company: Mondo Media

Original release
- Network: Mondo Media
- Release: 1999 – 2001

The God & Devil Show is an American adult animated web series that had a successful run from 1999 to 2001. The show was produced and developed by Mondo Media and was created by Aubrey Ankrum, who went on to create Happy Tree Friends.

== Overview ==
The God & Devil Show parodies many talk shows that feature celebrity interviews. The show features God as an old man with many flaws and misunderstanding of the modern world, and the devil as a promiscuous woman who enjoys the misfortune of the other characters. All the episodes feature an interview with a celebrity that usually goes wrong at some point, leading to further misfortune. At the end of every episode, the viewer is able to choose if they want to send the celebrity to Heaven or Hell by clicking the button of "God" or "The Devil". In Heaven, the celebrity gets something good and ends the episode by saying, "This is heaven." In Hell, the celebrity gets something bad and ends the episode by screaming "Nooooooooooooooo!".

== Crew ==
Most of the show's staff worked on other Mondo Media shows at the time and most of them went on to work on the popular show Happy Tree Friends.

=== Credits ===
- Created & Directed by: Aubrey Ankrum
- Executive Producer: John Evershed
- Produced by Julie Moskowitz, Liz Stuart & Eileen McKee
- Co-Directed by: Jeff Biancalana
- Animation Director: Kenn Navarro
- Writers: Aubrey Ankrum, Alf Adams, Jay Riddlesberger, Kenn Navarro, Warren Graff, Nick Torres
- Animation by Mondo Studios, Wild Brain, Smashing Ideas, Inc., Pork and Beans Productions, Inc., Full Swing Entertainment & "noisemedia"
- Additional Art & Design by Jennifer Hansen
- Voices: Jay Riddlesberger, Sally Dana, Aubrey Ankrum & the crew of the series
- Production Engineer: Julie London
- Music: RJ Eleven, Robert Warren
- Sound: Jim Lively, L. Kadet Khune, RJ Eleven, Sarah Castelblanco
- Technical Direction: Julie Stroud, Scott Walker

== Episodes ==
- Chris Rock
- Christopher Walken
- Chris Farley
- Bill Gates
- Angelina Jolie
- William Shatner
- Britney Spears
- Keith Richards
- Madonna
- Kurt Cobain
- Robert Downey Jr.
- Steve Irwin
- John Travolta
- Eminem
- Abraham Lincoln
- Woody Allen
- Stephen Hawking
- Bruce Willis
- George Lucas
- Ron Jeremy
- Pamela Anderson
- Walt Disney
- Tom Green
- Tom Hanks
- Sean Connery
- George W. Bush
- Princess Diana
- Charlton Heston
- Arnold Schwarzenegger
- Bill Clinton and Hillary Clinton
- Dr. Seuss
- Martha Stewart
- Calista Flockhart
- Spike Lee
- John Wayne
- Jesse Ventura
- Mahatma Gandhi
- Marilyn Manson
- The Osmonds
- Stephanie Seymour
- Mark Wahlberg
- Sarah Jessica Parker
- Jennifer Lopez
- Regis Philbin

== See also ==
- Happy Tree Friends
- Faith Fighter
