= Here's the Plan =

- Directed by: Fernanda Frick H.
- Screenplay by: Fernanda Frick H.
- Produced by: Fernanda Frick H. Marìa José Barros
- Starring: Alex Small-Butera; Lindsay Small-Butera
- Edited by: Cristián Toledo
- Music by: Joel P. West
- Production companies: Fernanda Frick Studio; Punk Robot; Estudio Pintamonos
- Release date: April 27, 2017
- Running time: 18 minutes
- Country: Chile
- Language: English

Here's the Plan is a 2017 English-language Chilean animated romantic drama short film, written and directed by Fernanda Frick H. The film follows the life of a married cat and dog couple who start off with a dream to open a bakery, only for their lives to drift apart due to a variety of circumstances. The film premiered at the Nashville Film Festival before getting released online several months later.

== Plot ==
Doug and Kat, a dog and cat respectively, have recently gotten married and live in a small and rather old house. At the beginning, Doug and Kat explain the "plan": to open their own bakery and "to keep on loving each other a lot, forever." Despite some reluctance about the bakery from Doug, he goes along with the plan too. As they bake cupcakes in their small kitchen, the oven suddenly cracks and breaks. The two decide to search for jobs to pay for the damages; Kat as an ad agency assistant and Doug as a coffee barista. They both promise to quit after they earn enough.

They buy a new oven, but it's too big and doesn't seem to fit their small kitchen. While messing with it, they accidentally break two ceramic dolls of themselves from their wedding. The two decide to work more so that they can renovate their kitchen; Kat joins the ad agency board and Doug gets promoted to manager. They expand their small house, but the constant work has made both of them too tired to bake.

Six years later, Kat finds the still broken ceramic dolls and the two decide that for their anniversary to come home early so that they can bake something together. However, Kat ends up staying late to help an employee. When she arrives, Doug is sitting at the dinner table, sad and with the dolls fixed. When he suggests they quit, Kat refuses as they are financially secure. As Doug leaves upstairs, he accidentally bumps the table and the dolls shatter.

Soon, their marriage begins to lose affection. Kat attempts to cheer up Doug with cupcakes, but he is disappointed by the fact that they were store-bought and decides to break up with Kat. As Doug packs his belongings to go, Kat suddenly remembers her passion for baking and stops him with another "plan" and takes a sledgehammer to the wall. The two embrace with their love restored. Doug and Kat are shown living in their new apartment situated above their newly built bakery. They look out together with them wondering what their new plan will be. After the credits, their ceramic dolls are seen repaired next their wedding photo.

== Cast ==
- Alex Small-Butera as Doug, Kat's canine husband.
- Lindsey Small-Butera as Kat, Doug's feline wife.

== Production ==
Fernanda Frick came up with the idea for the short after watching movies about marriages. "I began to notice that every time a marriage was shown on screen it seemed as if the worst thing that could happen to you in life was to be married." Frick was disappointed in the stereotypes of married couples; husbands as slobbish pigs and wives as hysterical manipulators. Shows like Parks and Recreation and indie films like Away We Go gave her a more positive outlook. Alex and Lindsay Small-Butera were a real couple, as well as fellow animators, that auditioned after several failed and "terrible" tryouts. Production was plagued by setbacks due to the fact that cgi animators were rare and uncommon in Chile. At one point, Frick had to outsource the rendering of the film to a render farm in China.

The overall aesthetic was inspired by the Craig Thompson graphic novel Good-bye, Chunky Rice as it featured "cute animals with complex human emotions and relationships". The film was initially much shorter, but Frick chose to expand it despite the possible threat of it not being able to compete in festivals. She also had to convince people that the film needed a happy ending stating "It's sad that something has to reflect a nihilist view of the world to be considered deep or worthwhile."

== Book adaptation ==
In 2022, Fernanda Frick revealed, via her YouTube channel, that she is turning the short film into a picture book. The book will be published in Spanish first before getting a proposed English translation.
