= Guardians of the Galaxy: The Telltale Series =

2017 episodic graphic adventure video game

Marvel's Guardians of the Galaxy: The Telltale Series
- Developer: Telltale Games
- Publisher: Telltale Games
- Directors: Jonathan Stauder; Jason Latino; Mark Droste; Chris Rebbert
- Designers: Molly Maloney; Emily Grace Buck; Jean Francois Guastalla; Matt Boland
- Programmers: Michael J. Carpenter; John Mauldin; David R. Chaverri
- Writers: Zack Keller; Nicole Martinez; Meghan Thornton; Josh Trujillo; Jessica Krause; Timothy Williams; Ross Beeley
- Composer: Jared Emerson-Johnson
- Engine: Telltale Tool
- Platforms: Android; iOS; PlayStation 4; Windows; Xbox One
- Release: Episode 1: WW: April 18, 2017; Episode 2: WW: June 6, 2017; Episode 3: WW: August 22, 2017; Episode 4: WW: October 10, 2017; Episode 5: WW: November 7, 2017
- Genres: Graphic adventure Interactive film
- Mode: Single-player

Guardians of the Galaxy: The Telltale Series is an episodic graphic adventure video game series developed and published by Telltale Games. Based on Marvel Comics' Guardians of the Galaxy comic book series, the game's first episode was released on April 18, 2017.

The plot centers on the Guardians' finding an artifact of great power called the "Eternity Forge" which each individually covets but must protect from the malicious Kree Hala the Accuser, who wants it for herself.

== Gameplay ==
Guardians of the Galaxy plays similar to other Telltale games, in which the player's character talks to other characters, explores environments and interacts with objects within it, and at times, completes action sequences made up of quick time events. Players make choices, such as dialogue selection, that create determinants within the story affecting later actions within the episode and in future episodes. Within the series, the player primarily plays as Star-Lord, but may at times briefly take the role of another Guardian during action sequences, or, during specific times, play as another character in a flashback.

== Development ==
Telltale and Marvel partnered to develop the game, quickly establishing that they wanted to make an original story that used the characters' canon but was not tied to the 2014 film. Telltale decided to go against an origin story, and instead focused on the connections between each of the five Guardians. Described by Marvel's Bil Rosemann: "A good Guardians story is about them as a family and showing how they're all misfits, they're all underdogs, they all feel like they don't have a family anymore" and coming together to form their own family that they depend on. Telltale saw this as well as elements from the established character histories to find "potentially surprising" elements to include, according to Telltale producer Justin Lambros. To achieve this, they planned each episode to center around each Guardian and explore their past, though the player will primarily remain in the role of Star-Lord throughout the series. This approach was novel for Telltale, since the character interactions the player opts for in earlier episodes can have a stronger impact on the later episodes, particularly in the relationship between the other Guardians. Telltale and Marvel's goal was to make the story accessible to people who may not have read through the comic series but had seen the film, while still dropping in hints and Easter eggs referring the Guardians' history in the comics to long-time fans.

Telltale's Guardians was first revealed during the December 2016 Game Awards, though rumors of the game had been previously found in material released by SAG-AFTRA actors as part of the 2016 video game voice actor strike in November. The game's first of five episodes was released on April 18, 2017; in additional to digital downloads, a retail version was available for the first episode release with an online pass to acquire the other episodes once released; it was released on May 2 in North America and May 5 in Europe.

Telltale hosted a panel about the game at the 2017 PAX East event in Boston, MA in March 2017, as well as having the first episode available for a "crowd play" session during the 2017 South by Southwest event.

=== Audio ===
The game is based on the Marvel Comics series and the recent film with an exclusive storyline. It has a different set of voice actors from the film. The cast includes Scott Porter as Star-Lord, Emily O'Brien as Gamora, Nolan North as Rocket Raccoon, Brandon Paul Eells as Drax the Destroyer, and Adam Harrington as Groot.

== Plot ==
On the outskirts of an abandoned planet, the Guardians of the Galaxy, led by Peter Quill / Star-Lord (Scott Porter), receive a call from the Nova Corps asking for assistance in defeating Thanos (Jake Hart). They arrive at a Kree outpost where they find Thanos in the lower section of the building, the Nova Corps having been killed. Thanos discovers an artifact called the Eternity Forge and claims it as his own. The Guardians engage him in battle, ending with Peter killing him with a weapon created by Rocket (Nolan North). The Guardians celebrate at Knowhere, where several members of the team consider leaving.

The next morning, they wake up to find that they are in debt of a large bar tab, causing Peter to sell Thanos' body to either the Collector or the Nova Corps. Peter also considers handing over the Eternity Forge, but retains it after witnessing a flashback with his mother Meredith (Courtenay Taylor). After handing the body over, the Guardians are attacked by Kree forces led by Hala the Accuser (Faye Kingslee), who steals the Eternity Forge. Peter chases after her with either Drax (Brandon Paul Elis) or Gamora (Emily O'Brien) and learns that Hala intends to resurrect the bodies of thousands of Kree soldiers, including her son Bal-Dinn (Johnny Yong Bosch). Peter dies after being mortally wounded by Hala, only to be brought back to life by the Forge.

The Guardians seek the help of Yondu (Mark Barbolak), a former space-pirate who raised Peter after his mother's death, to repair the ship. Holding the Forge together, Peter and Yondu share a vision where Meredith tells Peter to find her whilst Ancient Kree appears on the Forge. While repairing the ship, Gamora suggests finding her adopted sister Nebula (Ashly Burch), who has knowledge on Ancient Kree and is currently attacking the chosen seller for Thanos' body. However, Rocket, now knowing about the Forge's resurrection powers, asks Peter to travel to Halfworld and resurrect his deceased friend, Lylla (Fryda Wolff). Regardless of Peter's choice, the group capture Nebula and discover they cannot resurrect Lylla.

Nebula provides them with the translation, leading the Guardians back to the temple where they discovered the Forge. Revisiting the site, they discover the location of "Meredith" is a planet called Emnios and that the Forge is only working at its minimum capacity. They enter the temple and discover the person sending the messages: Mantis (Sumalee Montano). An empath, she has been using Peter's memories to bring him to the temple and free her, so she could guide him on how he used the Eternity Forge. Mantis explains that the Forge has the powers to control life-energy, allowing the user to control death and resurrect anyone currently dead; however, a person has to die in order for it to revive someone as the Forge can only transfer life energy, not create it (revealing that when Thanos was killed, his life energy was transferred into the Forge, which revived Peter). Having been kept away by the Kree until a person called the "Celestial One", determined to be Peter, had discovered her, Mantis was tasked with leading the Celestial One to the means of either destroying the Forge or empowering it.

The Guardians, split on destroying or empowering the Forge, agree to let Mantis guide them to the final temple. While trying to resolve conflict within the group, Peter discovers that Nebula faked Gamora's death to avoid the wrath of their adopted father, Thanos, which resulted in the constant tension between the sisters. Peter then convinces the pair to either reconcile (which causes Nebula to join the Guardians) or part ways. Mantis guides the group to the temple, where Peter decides the Forge's fate. Afterwards, Hala and her forces arrive (thanks to a tracking device that was placed on the Milano) and attempt to retrieve it. Hala either resurrects Bal-Dinn with the empowered Forge, or absorbs its power when it is destroyed but is severely burned.

After being thrown to the lower levels of the temple by Hala, the team escape but are swallowed by a giant worm and trapped in the creature's stomach, where they have the option to adopt a younger worm that they find. If she joined the Guardians, Nebula dies of her injuries. The group are forced to use the engines of other ships and empty out the Milano to lighten the load and escape the creature, but it still pursues them. Peter is forced to either allow Drax to seemingly sacrifice himself and allow the others to escape, or refuse and cause Groot (Adam Harrington) to be severely injured in the process. This choice causes disarray and everyone except Peter and either Gamora or Rocket to leave the group.

After seeing the devastation they are partially responsible for, Peter decides to reunite the Guardians and defeat Hala. If Peter allowed Drax to sacrifice himself earlier, he finds him alive and rescues him. After convincing all members to rejoin, the team formulates an attack on Hala's ship to stop her from destroying Knowhere. After placing charges on the main cannons (as well as fighting Nebula if she was told to leave earlier), the Guardians battle and defeat Hala, who destroys the ship when she attempts to fire the cannons. Hala either is handed over to Bal-Dinn or the Nova Corps to stand trial, or dies from either Bal-Dinn killing her or the remnants of the Eternity Forge taking her life.

Having once again saved the galaxy, the Guardians celebrate having defeated Hala at the same bar; their tab having been muted for saving Knowhere. If the Eternity Forge was empowered, Peter can use it to resurrect one of the people who they have lost; either Drax's daughter Kamaria, Lylla, Meredith, or Nebula (if she died). If Peter decides not to use it, the Forge's energy dies. During the celebrations, the Guardians are once again contacted by the Nova Corps, asking for help with another situation.

In a post-credits scene, Thanos' corpse is retrieved by an unknown individual.

== Episodes ==
The game was separated into five episodes for release on mobile devices, personal computers, and PlayStation 4 and Xbox One consoles. The version of the series for the Nintendo Switch was announced in August 2017, however no release was reported.

No.	Title	Directed by	Written by	Original release date
1	"Tangled Up in Blue"	Jonathan Stauder	Zack Keller, Nicole Martinez and Timothy Williams	April 18, 2017
The Guardians help the Nova Corps intercept Thanos as he steals an artifact from an ancient Kree tomb called the "Eternity Forge." Star-Lord uses Rocket's atomic gun to kill the Mad Titan, and after a night of celebration at a bar on Knowhere rack up a hefty tab. When getting the money to pay the tab, Hala the Accuser attacks the team and takes the Eternity Forge from Star-Lord's possession to resurrect the extinct Kree Empire. Peter pursues her with (either Drax or Gamora) to her ship. She mortally wounds Star-Lord, who barely escapes her with the Forge. In death, Peter sees his mother who (by way of the Eternity Forge), restores her son to life.
2	"Under Pressure"	Jason Latino	Nicole Martinez, Jessica Krause and Timothy Williams	June 6, 2017
When the Guardians stop on Rajak for repairs, Star-Lord visits his adopted father Yondu to learn how the Eternity Forge and his mother Meredith are connected. Experiencing another vision, Peter is shown Kree glyphs that Gamora thinks Nebula can translate, but Rocket wishes to detour to Halfworld to see if the Eternity Forge can bring back his lost friend Lylla. After persuading Nebula to help them, the Guardians return to the artifact's temple and are directed to Emnios, but are attacked by Hala's Kree soldiers. Barely escaping, the Guardians arrive on Emnios, where Peter believes he'll find his mother.
3	"More than a Feeling"	Mark Droste	Meghan Thornton, Zack Keller and Jessica Krause	August 22, 2017
Entering the Temple on Emnios, Peter experiences another memory of his childhood while Gamora relives Nebula betraying her. Finding a casket within the Temple, they open it and release an alien named Mantis – the Eternity Forge's guardian and the one who called out to Star-Lord using his mother's image, believing he is "The Celestial One" destined to determine the Forge's fate. Guided by Mantis to the Kree's Sacred Shrine on Drobino, Star-Lord must decide whether to empower or destroy the Eternity Forge – a choice the rest of the Guardians are hotly divided on – before Hala arrives to try and claim it for herself.
4	"Who Needs You"	Chris Rebbert	Josh Trujillo, Ross Beeley, Jessica Krause and Tim Williams	October 10, 2017
With the fate of the Eternity Forge decided and Guardians more divided than ever, Star-Lord is left struggling to hold the team together after Hala destroys the Temple and traps them in the caves below. As they evade the threat of a rock-worm hive, Star-Lord is accidentally shown Drax's past by Mantis and learns he blames himself for his daughter's death. The Guardians eventually manage to escape caves and return to the Milano, but the ship is swallowed by a massive rock-worm, forcing the Guardians to make painful sacrifices in order to escape – ones that fracture their already-strained relations to the core, causing the team to disband.
5	"Don't Stop Believin'"	Jason Latino	Jessica Krause	November 7, 2017
After Hala destroys a planet with millions of innocent people on it using the power of the Eternity Forge, Star-Lord must rally the disbanded Guardians for a final battle. Groot voluntarily shows Mantis his memories of the Guardians' first meeting, proving to her that the team can remain friends despite their conflicts. With Mantis' help, Star-Lord manages to find the rest his team and reconcile them, leading them into battle on Hala's ship as it attempts to destroy Knowhere – and facing difficult decisions about the consequences of his past choices. When the dust settles, the Guardians return to Knowhere to celebrate their victory, though are quickly called to duty once again. In a post-credits scene, a mysterious figure is seen taking possession of Thanos' body.

== Reception ==
Aggregate review scores
Game	Metacritic
Episode 1: Tangled Up in Blue	(PC) 70 (PS4) 72 (XONE) 74
Episode 2: Under Pressure	(PC) 72 (PS4) 70 (XONE) 78
Episode 3: More Than a Feeling	(PC) 72 (PS4) 65 (XONE) 70
Episode 4: Who Needs You	(PC) 71 (PS4) 68 (XONE) 73
Episode 5: Don't Stop Believin'	(PC) 68 (PS4) 72 (XONE) 69

Guardians of the Galaxy: The Telltale Series received generally mixed reviews from critics, with criticism for some aspects of the writing. Praise was given to Scott Porter's performance of Star-Lord, who critics felt "carried the entire game".

=== Episode 1: Tangled Up in Blue ===
Episode 1 received "mixed or average" reviews on all platforms according to the review aggregation website Metacritic.

=== Episode 2: Under Pressure ===
The Xbox One version of Episode 2 received "generally favorable reviews", while the PC and PlayStation 4 versions received "mixed or average" reviews, according to Metacritic.

=== Episode 3: More Than a Feeling ===
Episode 3 received "mixed or average reviews" on all platforms according to Metacritic.

=== Episode 4: Who Needs You ===
Episode 4 received "mixed or average reviews" on all platforms according to Metacritic.

=== Episode 5: Don't Stop Believin' ===
Episode 5 received "mixed or average" reviews on all platforms according to Metacritic.

=== Accolades ===
The game won the awards for "Performance in a Comedy, Lead" with Scott Porter, and for "Performance in a Comedy, Supporting" with Adam Harrington at the National Academy of Video Game Trade Reviewers Awards; in addition, it was nominated for "Excellence in Convergence" at the 2018 SXSW Gaming Awards.
