= Metaboli =

French video game distributor

Metaboli is a French video game distributor, through their Gamesplanet properties. It is present in numerous countries including France, Germany, the United Kingdom and the United States. Some major publishers have large catalogs available on Metaboli's database such as Activision, Electronic Arts, Ubisoft, Rockstar Games, Square Enix, THQ, Sega, and Bethesda Softworks.

== History ==
The company began operations in France in August 2001. By the time they expanded to the United Kingdom in July 2005, Metaboli already had some 15,000 subscribers. Since then, the service has expanded from 45 titles to over 300. Metaboli has spread its catalogue to majors ISP portals (Orange, SFR, Virgin Media, T-Online), web portals (MSN, AOL) multimedia stores (Fnac, Game, Micromania).

In March 2007, Metaboli launched Gamesplanet, which sells digital copies of PC games through a separate site from the main Metaboli one.

In September 2008 the company expanded and purchased GameTap from Turner Broadcasting System. US operations were closed in 2010. By January 2011, the service had expanded to include access to over 600 games via the UK mirror.

== See also ==
- Digital distribution
- Gaming on demand
