= 6 Point Harness =

Production label for Mondo Media

Six Point Harness
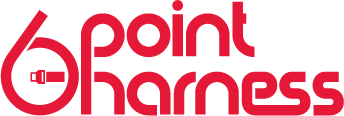
- Type: Subsidiary
- Industry: Animation
- Founded: June 25, 2003; 23 years ago
- Founder: Brendan Burch
- Headquarters: Los Angeles, California, U.S.
- Key people: Brendan Burch (CEO); Douglas S. Kay (CFO)
- Parent: Mondo Media (2016–present)
- Divisions: 6 Point 2
- Website: sixpointharness.com

6 Point Harness is an American animation studio and production label of Mondo Media based in Los Angeles. It develops and produces animated television programming, feature films, commercial, music videos and web-based content. Founded by Brendan Burch in 2003, some of the studio's most notable productions include Tom Hanks' Electric City, Fox's Cosmos: A Spacetime Odyssey, MTV's Good Vibes, Nick Jr.'s Wow! Wow! Wubbzy!, Nickelodeon's El Tigre: The Adventures of Manny Rivera, Adult Swim's Apollo Gauntlet and Lazor Wulf, the animated feature The Drawn Together Movie: The Movie!, and the web series Dick Figures for the YouTube channel Mondo Media. 6PH also released Dick Figures: The Movie, an in-house production developed from the company's web series.

On September 19, 2016, it was announced that 6 Point Harness merged with Mondo Media, with Mondo being the surviving entity. Despite ceasing to be a distinct legal operation, it remains the primary production and distribution arm for Mondo's filmed and televised output. Burch is currently CEO of the merged company, replacing Mondo's John Evershed.

== History ==
Brendan Burch founded the studio in June 2003. In 2010, 6 Point Harness approached Mondo Media with a pitch for Dick Figures and arranged a partnership for the series; 6 Point Harness provided the financing and production while distribution was provided by Mondo Media.

In 2011, John Andrews came on board with the company to form 6 Point Media, the commercial branch of the studio. Six Point Harness and Titmouse, Inc. launched Rug Burn, a YouTube channel for animation, in 2012. Six Point Harness raised $313,411 through KickStarter to produce a feature-length episode of Dick Figures in 2012.

In 2013, the studio had two nominations for "Best Animated Web Series" for Dick Figures and Electric City at the Streamy Awards, with Electric City bringing the studio its first Streamy Award. That same year Dick Figures received an Annie Award nomination for Outstanding Achievement, Directing in an Animated Television or other Broadcast Venue Production.

Outside of web series, the studio is most notable for providing the animation for the 2020 Oscar winning animated short Hair Love and producing animated sequences for Black-ish.

== Productions ==
=== Television ===
Title	Year(s)	Notes	Client(s)
Phil Hendrie	2003	TV pilot	Fox
Kid Notorious	2003	Animation services; uncredited	Comedy Central
Drew Carey's Green Screen Show	2004	animated sequences	Warner Bros. Television
My Wife and Kids	2005	"Jr's Cartoon" (animated sequence)	Touchstone Television
Sunday Pants	2005	"Weighty Decisions" shorts	Cartoon Network
Twinkle	2005	TV pilot	Klasky Csupo
Where My Dogs At?	2006		MTV
Shaggy & Scooby-Doo Get a Clue!	2006	main titles	Warner Bros. Television
Medium	2006	"Four Dreams" (animation)	CBS Paramount Television
Random! Cartoons	2006	"Ratzafratz!"	Nickelodeon
Wow! Wow! Wubbzy!	2006–2010		Bolder Media; Starz Media
Slacker Cats	2007		ABC Family
El Tigre: The Adventures of Manny Rivera	2007		Nickelodeon
Mask of Santo	2008	TV pilot	Cartoon Network
Bumble Braynes	2008	TV pilot	Cartoon Network
The Electric Company	2009	"Odd Couple" shorts	Sesame Workshop
Drop Dead Diva	2009	"What If?" (animation)	Sony Pictures Television
'Til Death	2010	"The Wedding" (animation)	Sony Pictures Television
Kirstie Alley's Big Life	2010	main titles	FremantleMedia
The Benson Interruption	2010	main titles	Comedy Central
Gypsy Cab	2010	TV pilot	Comedy Central
Wyatt Cenac: Comedy Person	2011	TV special (animation)	Comedy Central
Good Vibes	2011		MTV
The Looney Tunes Show	2012	"The Shelf" ("Chintzy" segment)	Warner Bros. Television
Fringe	2012	"Black Blotter" (animated sequence)	Warner Bros. Television
Holliston	2013	"Blobby" (animation)	Fearnet
Comedians in Cars Getting Coffee	2014	"Comedy, Sex and the Blue Numbers" (animation)	Sony Pictures Television
Cosmos: A Spacetime Odyssey	2014		Cosmos Studios
Garfunkel and Oates	2014	"Eggs" (animation)	IFC
Like, Share, Die	2015		Mondo Media
Everstar	2015	TV pilot	Amazon Studios
Fresh Beat Band of Spies	2015–2016	As 6point2	Nickelodeon
Black-ish	2015–2022	animated sequences	ABC Studios
The Greeks	2016	2D animation	National Geographic Society
Under Mondo Media
Rad Lands	2017	animation	Chipotle Mexican Grill
Apollo Gauntlet	2017		Adult Swim
Hawaii Five-0	2017	"A'ole e 'olelo mai ana ke ahi ua ana ia" (animation)	CBS Television Studios
30 for 30	2017	"Nature Boy" (2D animation)	ESPN Films
Life in Pieces	2018	"Reading Egg Nurse Neighbor" (animated sequence)	20th Century Fox Television
Dietland	2018	main titles	AMC
Legend of the Three Caballeros	2018		Disney Digital Network
Tender Touches	2018	Season 2	Adult Swim
Lazor Wulf	2020	Season 2	Adult Swim
Smiling Friends	2020	pilot only	Adult Swim
Marvel 616	2020	Brute Force animation segment	Disney+
How to Become a Tyrant	2021	animation	Netflix
The Boys	2022	"Here Comes a Candle to Light You to Bed" and "The Instant White-Hot Wild" (animation sequences)	Amazon Studios
Fightlore	2022	"Mark Schultz's Ultimate Victory" (animation)	UFC
Atlanta	2022	"The Goof Who Sat By the Door" (animated sequences)	FX Productions
How to Become a Cult Leader	2023	animated sequence	Netflix
Oh My God... Yes!	2023–present		Adult Swim
Good Times: Black Again	2024		Netflix

=== Films ===
Title	Year	Notes	Client
EuroTrip	2004	title sequence	DreamWorks
Black Dynamite	2009		ARS Nova
Scooby-Doo! Abracadabra-Doo	2010	title sequence	Warner Bros.
Scooby-Doo! Camp Scare	2010	title sequence	Warner Bros.
Carbon Nation	2010	animation	Earth School Education Foundation
The Drawn Together Movie: The Movie!	2010		Comedy Central
Priest	2011	prologue	Screen Gems
Dick Figures: The Movie	2013		Mondo Media
Cloudy with a Chance of Meatballs 2	2013	end credits and digital shorts	Sony Pictures Animation
The Yes Men Are Revolting	2014	animation	The Orchard
The SpongeBob Movie: Sponge Out of Water	2015	rap battle sequence and end credits	Paramount Pictures
Call Me Lucky	2015	animation	MPI Films
Barbie: Star Light Adventure	2016	additional animation	Mattel Creations
ForEveryone.Net	2016	animation	Nonfiction Unlimited
Under Mondo Media
Guava Island	2019	main titles	Amazon Studios
Hair Love	2019	short film	Sony Pictures Animation
Tig Notaro: Drawn	2021		HBO Entertainment
The Great Wolf Pack: A Call to Adventure	2022		Great Wolf Entertainment

=== Video games ===
- Band Hero (cutscenes) (2009)
- Dark Souls III (animated trailer) (2015)
- We Are OFK (title sequence) (2022)

=== Web ===
- Tire Fire Films (2006)
- Revisioned: Tomb Raider Animated Series ("Pre-Teen Raider") (2007)
- Larry Craig's Sexy Stall Tactics (2007)
- Read A Book (2008)
- Ghost Town by Shiny Toy Guns (music video) (2009)
- The American Dream (short) (2010)
- Dick Figures (2010–2015)
- CollegeHumor ("Realistic Superhero Funeral" and "Pizza Quest!") (2010–2011)
- The First Time I Ran Away by M. Ward (music video) (2012)
- Electric City (2012)
- Listing by Minus the Bear (music video) (2012)
- Nickelodeon Animated Shorts Program ("Austin Oliver", "Cabrito and Chewy", "Carrot and Stick" and "Bear Wrestler") (2012–2013)
- We The Economy ("GDP Smackdown", "Taxation Nation" and "The Unbelievably Sweet Alpacas") (2014)
- Ninja Sex Party: Rhinoceratops vs. Superpuma (2014)
- Lizzie (2016)
- As Told By Emoji (2016–present)
- Minions and Friends (2017–2020)
- Deep Space 69 (season 4) (2017–2018)
- HBO Backstories ("Insecure") (2019)
- The Birds & The Bees (2019)
