= SpindoTV =

Children animation channel

- Network: YouTube

Programming
- Language: English

Ownership
- Owner: Spin Master; Mondo Media

History
- Launched: February 18, 2015; 11 years ago
- Closed: July 10, 2016; 10 years ago

Availability

Streaming media
- YouTube: SpindoTV

SpindoTV was a children animation channel. A joint venture by Spin Master and Mondo Media, it launched in 2015, before ceasing broadcast in 2016.

== Programming ==
- Sick Bricks
- Happy Together
- The Amazing Adrenalini Brothers
- Skater vs...
- Gummandos
- Beat the Parents
- Barry & Karl
- Ralph Kard
- Fact or Crap
- Detention 7
- Evan the Epic
- Kicko Puncho Rhino
- Da Ninjas
- Problem Show
- Power Gloves
- DimpleDoof
- Snackdown
- Meccanoid Mayhem
- Spooky Sights
- Sir Chainsaw
- Boltron Ultimate
