= Lazor Wulf =

American adult animated television series

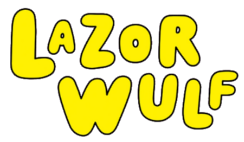
- Genre: Adult animation Absurdist Comedy
- Created by: Henry Bonsu
- Developed by: Henry Bonsu; Daniel Weidenfeld
- Directed by: Henry Bonsu
- Voices of: Vince Staples; D.R.A.M.; J.D. Witherspoon; Ettore "Big E" Ewen; Quinta Brunson; Reginald VelJohnson; Andre Pascoe
- Country of origin: United States
- Original language: English
- No. of seasons: 2
- No. of episodes: 20

Production
- Executive producers: Henry Bonsu; Carl Jones; Daniel Weidenfeld; Scott Greenberg (season 1); Joel Kuwahara (season 1); Vince Staples; Keith Crofford (Note: executive producer for Williams Street); Walter Newman
- Producers: Jason Stiff; Ollie Green (Note: producer for Williams Street); Aubrey Danielson (Note: associate producer); Matt Salkin; Duncan Ferguson
- Editor: Andrew Lainhart
- Running time: 11–12 minutes
- Production companies: Titmouse, Inc. (Pilot); Bento Box Entertainment (season 1); 6 Point Harness (season 2); Williams Street

Original release
- Network: Adult Swim
- Release: April 7, 2019 – January 11, 2021

Lazor Wulf is an American adult animated television series created by Henry Bonsu for Cartoon Network's Adult Swim block that premiered on April 8, 2019. Originating as a webcomic on Tumblr in 2013, it is directed by creator Henry Bonsu, with Daniel Weidenfeld who serves as co-developer. The first season was animated by Bento Box Entertainment and the second season was animated by 6 Point Harness.

On November 7, 2019, Adult Swim announced that the show has been renewed for a second season, which had a stealth premiere on April 1, 2020 and officially premiered on December 7, 2020.

In June 2021, writer Judnick Mayard announced that Adult Swim cancelled the series after two seasons. The show was also rapper D.R.A.M.'s voice acting debut.

== Synopsis ==
Lazor Wulf follows a wolf who carries a laser on his back and the adventures he and his pack of carefree friends face while hanging out at their neighborhood joints like The Clurb and Esther's.

== Cast ==
- Vince Staples as Lazor Wulf
- J.D. Witherspoon as Stupid Horse, Various
- Ettore "Big E" Ewen as Canon Wulf
- Andre Pascoe as King Yeti
- Reginald VelJohnson as God
- Quinta Brunson as Blazor Wulf, The Youth
- D.R.A.M. as Wallace
- Henry Bonsu as Various

== Episodes ==
Series overview
Season	Episodes	Originally released	
Season	Episodes	First released	Last released
Pilot		Unaired	
1	10	April 7, 2019	May 5, 2019
2	10	April 1, 2020 (Note: The second season of Lazor Wulf premiered unannounced on April 1, 2020. The remaining episodes began airing on December 7, 2020)	January 11, 2021

=== Pilot (2016) ===
Title	Written and directed by	Original release date
"Lazor Wulf"	Henry Bonsu	Unaired
Lazor Wulf falls in love with a force of nature. Smitten with the idea of being in a relationship, he tries to create a robot of Stupid Horse with a part of a Human brain to impress his crush. (not confirmed to be the actual plot)

=== Season 1 (2019) ===
No. overall	No. in season	Title	Written by	Storyboarded by	Original release date	Prod. code	US viewers (millions)
1	1	"Dying to Eat"	Sarah Bellardini & Henry Bonsu	Chris Cornwell, Matt Marblo & Jared D. Weiss	April 7, 2019	101	0.550
After Esther's is destroyed, Lazor Wulf plans his future death, as he claims to be allergic to everything but Esther's. Meanwhile Stupid Horse tries to replicate Esther's to stop him from dying.
2	2	"That Was Today. This Is Tomorrow"	Brian Ash & Henry Bonsu	Chris Cornwell, Matt Marblo & Jared D. Weiss	April 7, 2019	102	0.454
After Gawd's stress levels rise, he forces him and everyone in Strongburg to take a day off, much to Lazor Wulf's dismay.
3	3	"Lane Occupied"	Phillip Walker & Henry Bonsu	Henry Bonsu, Billie Liao, Gloria McAndrew & Jared D. Weiss	April 14, 2019	103	0.582
Stupid Horse finds a group of people who respect him.
4	4	"At the End of the Day"	Quinta Brunson & Henry Bonsu	Henry Bonsu, Billie Liao, Gloria McAndrew & Jared D. Weiss	April 14, 2019	104	0.527
Lazor Wulf and Canon Wulf's howling at the Moon attracts everyone in Strongburg.
5	5	"We Good!"	Brian Ash & Henry Bonsu	Henry Bonsu, Billie Liao, Gloria McAndrew & Jared D. Weiss	April 21, 2019	105	0.661
After Canon Wulf buys the local Delicadanci, the power and money go to his head.
6	6	"Where You From?"	Judnick Mayard, Sarah Bellardini, & Henry Bonsu	Henry Bonsu, Billie Liao, Gloria McAndrew & Jared D. Weiss	April 21, 2019	106	0.513
It is shown how the town of Strongburg came to be.
7	7	"Prolly for the Best"	Henry Bonsu	Henry Bonsu, Billie Liao, Gloria McAndrew & Jared D. Weiss	April 28, 2019	107	0.564
After Lazor Wulf's new song becomes a hit, Gawd accuses him of stealing it from him.
8	8	"Keep It Moving"	Sarah Bellardini & Henry Bonsu	Henry Bonsu, Billie Liao, Gloria McAndrew & Jared D. Weiss	April 28, 2019	108	0.529
Lazor Wulf, Canon Wulf, and King Yeti set out to find the last copy of Action Jackson, while Stupid Horse is being tricked into smuggling things.
9	9	"They Ain't Know"	Carl Jones & Henry Bonsu	Henry Bonsu, Billie Liao, Gloria McAndrew & Jared D. Weiss	May 5, 2019	109	0.617
Lazor Wulf goes to extreme measures when trying to prove that the Earth is round.
10	10	"It Is What It Is"	Carl Jones & Henry Bonsu	Henry Bonsu, Billie Liao, Gloria McAndrew & Jared D. Weiss	May 5, 2019	110	0.507
Lazor, Canon, Blazor, and Florence try to have a good Father's Day with their estranged father/husband, Demon Wulf.

=== Season 2 (2020–21) ===
No. overall	No. in season	Title	Written by	Storyboarded by	Original release date	Prod. code	U.S. viewers (millions)
11	1	"Still Dying to Eat"	Carl Jones	Domitille Collardey Adebimpe, Natalie James, Jackie Snyder & Jared D. Weiss	December 7, 2020	201	0.401
When Battle Ham disappears due to Gawd removing all food from the world, the Strongburg citizens mourn him in different ways.
12	2	"If That Was Tomorrow. This Is Today."	Sarah Bellardini	Domitille Collardey Adebimpe, Natalie James, Jackie Snyder & Jared D. Weiss	December 7, 2020	202	0.320
To make money, King Yeti plans an auction to sell his beloved bike and Lazor Wulf gets a job to buy it for him.
13	3	"Unoccupied Lane"	Quinta Brunson	Domitille Collardey Adebimpe, Natalie James, Jackie Snyder & Jared D. Weiss	April 1, 2020	203	0.350
Stupid Horse receives an upgrade after a major injury. Note: This episode was previewed as part of Adult Swim's April Fools sneak previews, it was re-aired on December 14, 2020 in its correct placement in the season.
14	4	"The End Is High"	Judnick Mayard	Domitille Collardey Adebimpe, Natalie James, Jackie Snyder & Jared D. Weiss	December 14, 2020	204	0.358
After the citizens of Strongburg get the Earth blown up again, Gawd forces them to live up in Heaven with him.
15	5	"We Good?"	Ellington Wells	Domitille Collardey Adebimpe, Natalie James, Jackie Snyder & Jared D. Weiss	December 21, 2020	205	0.320
The Youth seeks revenge on Canon Wulf for spilling her milk, while Canon Wulf treats the Delicadancers to a spa day.
16	6	"Where You Stay?"	Sarah Bellardini	Domitille Collardey Adebimpe, Natalie James, Jackie Snyder & Jared D. Weiss	December 21, 2020	206	0.269
Jamantha invites Lamont Brickwater onto her talk show in order to expose him as a fraud.
17	7	"Prolly for the Better?"	Judnick Mayard	Domitille Collardey Adebimpe, Natalie James, Jackie Snyder & Jared D. Weiss	January 4, 2021	207	0.336
Lazor Wulf and God engage in a cosmic game of Rock Paper Scissors.
18	8	"Keep Going"	Henry Bonsu	Domitille Collardey Adebimpe, Natalie James, Jackie Snyder & Jared D. Weiss	January 4, 2021	208	0.279
Lazor Wulf, convinced that Action Jackson is a documentary, pesters Carl Weathers and accuses him of killing the titular character. Note: Guest stars WWE Superstars Xavier Woods and Kofi Kingston as Carl Weathers and Officer Kingston respectively. In WWE, Woods and Kingston were part of a tag team with series regular Big E, collectively known as The New Day.
19	9	"They Knew"	Ellington Wells	Domitille Collardey Adebimpe, Natalie James, Jackie Snyder & Jared D. Weiss	January 11, 2021	209	0.334
Matilda makes a bet with God to allow the Round Earthers to change Tuesdays into Sundays if she can convince Lazor Wulf to sign an eternal contract.
20	10	"Is It Tho?"	Henry Bonsu	Domitille Collardey Adebimpe, Natalie James, Jackie Snyder & Jared D. Weiss	January 11, 2021	210	0.317
Blazor's new plant store is haunted by a Forest Spirit.
