= The Walking Dead: Michonne =

2016 episodic graphic adventure video game

- Developer: Telltale Games
- Publisher: Telltale Games
- Directors: Kent Mudle; Sean Manning; Jason Latino
- Producer: Bryan Roth
- Designers: Chris Hockabout; John Bernhelm; Michael McCormick
- Programmers: Jason Kim; Carl Muckenhoupt
- Artist: Jesse Maccabe
- Writers: Nicole Martinez; Meghan Thornton; Zack Keller
- Composer: Jared Emerson-Johnson
- Series: The Walking Dead
- Engine: Telltale Tool
- Platforms: Windows; OS X; PlayStation 3; PlayStation 4; Xbox 360; Xbox One; iOS; Android
- Release: Episode 1: Windows, OS X, PlayStation 3, PlayStation 4, Xbox 360 & Xbox One; February 23, 2016; iOS & Android; February 25, 2016; Episode 2: March 29, 2016; Episode 3: April 26, 2016
- Genres: Graphic adventure; Interactive movie
- Mode: Single-player

The Walking Dead: Michonne (Note: Also known as Telltale's The Walking Dead: Michonne, or alternatively subtitled with A Telltale Miniseries or A Telltale Games Mini-Series) is a 2016 episodic graphic adventure video game by Telltale Games, based on The Walking Dead comic book series and serving as a standalone spin-off of Telltale's The Walking Dead video game series. Taking place between issues 126 and 139 of the comic series, the game shows events of what Michonne was up to during her temporary departure from the group of survivors led by Rick Grimes in the midst of a zombie apocalypse. Samira Wiley voiced Michonne in the game. The game is presented as a three-"episode" game "miniseries", and the three episodes were released between February and April 2016 for Windows personal computers, PlayStation 3, PlayStation 4, Xbox 360 and Xbox One consoles, and mobile devices.

== Plot ==
This is a broad overview of the plot. Certain decisions made by the player will alter details of specific events.

After the war against Negan and the Saviors, Michonne leaves the survivor communities to search for her missing daughters, Colette and Elodie. She eventually joins a boat group led by Pete and consisting of Siddiq, Oak, and Berto.

Plagued by nightmares of having abandoned her daughters, Michonne attempts suicide but is stopped by Pete. Michonne and Pete go themselves to investigate The Mobjack, an abandoned ferry they received a signal from. While scavenging, they are ambushed by Samantha and Greg Fairbanks. The four are taken hostage by Randall, a member of Monroe, which is led by his sister, Norma, and is hunting Sam and Greg for having stolen supplies from them. They are taken to Monroe, a bayou-like community, where Michonne and Samantha are left in a storage room. A member of Monroe, Zachary, questions Michonne. During the questioning, Zachary accidentally shoots and kills Greg.

In the chaos, Michonne and Samantha rescue Pete and escape Monroe through the woods. Pursued by Randall, Sam suggests that they hide at her family's home. Samantha is then shot in the shoulder by Randall, but they successfully escape. They arrive at Samantha's house, where they meet her father John, younger brothers James and Alex, and her best friend, Paige. Michonne removes the bullet from Samantha's shoulder and cauterizes the wound. While she rests, Michonne learns that Sam's mother committed suicide due to the stress from the apocalypse.

Having forgotten to close their gate, John is shot and killed by Randall, who assaults the house with his soldiers. They repel the attacks with the help of Paige, subdue Randall, and hold him hostage. Realizing that Randall is a bargaining chip, they prepare as they wait for Norma's arrival. Sam buries her father with Michonne's help. Norma arrives with soldiers from Monroe, revealing that she captured Pete's crew and offers a prisoner exchange. The exchange turns into a battle as one of Norma's men kills Berto in revenge for the violence at Monroe. Randall dies during the gunfight, leading to a fight between Norma and Michonne. Michonne cuts Norma's arm off, killing her.

Michonne and her group retreat to the house, but two Monroe men set it on fire using molotov cocktails. They save James and Alex before escaping through the roof. Michonne and her crew make their way back to the boat, where they plan to scavenge Monroe and drop off the remaining survivors up north. Michonne expresses her survivor's guilt to Pete, who suggests that she rejoin Rick Grimes at Alexandria. As the rest of the group heads back to the boat, Michonne hallucinates Colette and Elodie. Although reluctant, Michonne decides not to pursue them and joins the rest of the group.

== Episodes ==
The game was separated into three episodes, released in one-month intervals.

| No. | Title | Directed by | Written by | Original release date |
|---|---|---|---|---|
| 1 | "In Too Deep" | Kent Mudle | Meghan Thornton; Nicole Martinez | February 23, 2016 |
Michonne joins Pete and his crew aboard The Companion and intercepts a distress signal leading them to a mysterious community called Monroe.
| 2 | "Give No Shelter" | Sean Manning | Zack Keller; Andrew Hanson | March 29, 2016 |
Michonne and Pete are forced to decide what action to take after Sam is severely injured during their escape from the hostile town of Monroe.
| 3 | "What We Deserve" | Jason Latino | Nicole Martinez; Erica Harrell; Desirée Proctor; Joshua Rubin | April 26, 2016 |
Michonne, Pete, Sam, and the surviving members of her family hold down fort as they await Norma's impending arrival.

== Development ==
In June 2015, Telltale announced a three-episode series titled The Walking Dead: Michonne. The mini-series was originally scheduled to be released as downloadable content for Season Two. However, in December 2015, Telltale announced that the game would be released in February 2016 as a standalone title that would not require any previous game in the series to play.

Michonne was the first game developed under a partial reworking of the new Telltale Tool, the game's engine, that provided better support for newer consoles, particularly with DirectX. The completely reworked Telltale Tool was completed for Telltale's next release, Batman: The Telltale Series.

=== Soundtrack ===
On September 10, 2019, an official soundtrack album of Jared Emerson-Johnson's score to the game was released for digital download and on streaming services, with a special edition set of vinyl LPs due to release shortly thereafter.

== Reception ==
Aggregate review scores
| Game | Metacritic |
|---|---|
| Episode 1: In Too Deep | (PC) 69 (PS4) 70 (XONE) 65 |
| Episode 2: Give No Shelter | (PC) 66 (PS4) 82 (XONE) 78 |
| Episode 3: What We Deserve | (PC) 71 (PS4) 76 (XONE) 73 |
| A Telltale Miniseries | (PC) 67 (PS4) 64 |

The Walking Dead: Michonne received mixed reviews from critics. It received praise for its atmosphere, action sequences, and the character development of Michonne, but was criticized for its story, side characters, short episode lengths, and graphical glitches.

=== Episode 1: In Too Deep ===
Aggregating review website Metacritic gave the Microsoft Windows version 69/100 based on 42 reviews, the PlayStation 4 version 70/100 based on 10 reviews, and the Xbox One version 65/100 based on 9 reviews.

=== Episode 2: Give No Shelter ===
Aggregating review website Metacritic gave the Microsoft Windows version 66/100 based on 24 reviews, the PlayStation 4 version 82/100 based on 5 reviews, and the Xbox One version 78/100 based on 6 reviews.

=== Episode 3: What We Deserve ===
Aggregating review website Metacritic gave the Microsoft Windows version 71/100 based on 23 reviews, the PlayStation 4 version 76/100 based on 8 reviews, and the Xbox One version 73/100 based on 4 reviews.
