= Later Alligator =

2019 video game

- Developer: Pillow Fight
- Director: Lindsay Small-Butera
- Programmer: Conrad Kreyling
- Artists: Lindsay Small-Butera; Alex Small-Butera
- Composer: Matt "2 Mello" Hopkins
- Platforms: Microsoft Windows, MacOS, Linux, Nintendo Switch
- Release: Windows, MacOS: WW: September 18, 2019; Linux: WW: December 19, 2019; Nintendo Switch: WW: March 16, 2021
- Genre: Adventure game
- Mode: Single-player

Later Alligator is a 2019 point-and-click adventure game developed by American studio Pillow Fight in collaboration with SmallBü Animation. The game tasks players with exploring Alligator New York City and playing various mini-games to solve a mystery. It was released in September 2019 for Microsoft Windows, and MacOS, followed by a Linux version in December. A port for the Nintendo Switch was released in March 2021.

== Gameplay ==
Adelaide's Arcade, one of the game's locations

In Later Alligator, players control an unnamed individual who is hired by Pat, an anxious and paranoid alligator. The player can travel to different areas of Alligator New York City to locate various members of Pat's family, asking each of them questions about themselves and the nature of a mysterious "Event" being held that night. To gain more information, the player must complete requests or challenges offered by each character, which take the form of different mini-games. These mini-games feature objectives such as achieving a set score on a pinball machine, solving a sliding puzzle, or completing a Tower of Hanoi-inspired game about stacking pancakes. Some mini-games feature alternate reality game components, such as sending the player to an external website where the solution can be found. Players will be awarded a badge bearing a family member's likeness upon completing their associated mini-game; up to 33 total badges can be earned. There are also 48 collectible puzzle pieces that can be found scattered around the different environments, which are used in a later mini-game.

Each time the player plays a mini-game or travels to a different area, time passes on the in-game clock. When the clock reaches 8:00 PM, the player will be transported to the game's final mini-game, with the game's ending determined by the number of badges obtained. Upon finishing the game, the player is able to restart the story with all their badges and puzzle pieces retained, giving them the opportunity to play the mini-games they missed and collect the remaining badges to achieve the best ending.

== Plot ==
The game begins with the player character meeting an anxious alligator named Pat in a hotel restaurant. Pat believes his family is going to murder him that night at 8:00 PM during something called "the Event", and asks for help in finding out their plans. The player agrees and begins moving between the various districts of Alligator New York City, interviewing Pat's family and friends to learn about their relationships with Pat, and assists them with different tasks in order to coerce more information about the Event out of them. At various points during the day, Pat calls the player back to the hotel to assist him with some other trouble.

At 8:00 PM, the player returns to the hotel and guides Pat upstairs to the Event, revealed to be his birthday party. All the characters whose badges the player obtained are shown to be in attendance, who explain that Pat mistakes his surprise party for a murder attempt every year. The player is then given the option to customize their character's appearance and join everyone for a group photograph. The story then restarts from the beginning, and the player is encouraged to find and help the remaining family members.

Finishing the story a second time triggers a cliffhanger ending, in which the player attempts to kill Pat by pushing him off the hotel balcony. Finishing the story with every family badge unlocks the true ending, in which the player has a change of heart and catches Pat before he falls, pulling him back up. The next day at Pat's house, Pat learns from the player that they are a hitman whom Pat accidentally hired to assassinate himself, due to mistaking a classified ad in the newspaper as a cry for help. Realizing the only real danger to himself was the result of his own actions, Pat resolves to try to avoid letting his fear control him in the future.

== Development and release ==
Later Alligator was announced on November 29, 2018, with a set release date of Spring 2019. The game began as a collaboration between SmallBü Animation and Pillow Fight. The developers had met previously, where the idea of creating a game had been mentioned. A few months later, SmallBü pitched the idea for Later Alligator to Pillow Fight, and work on the game was started. SmallBü would animate, pitch ideas and write, and Pillow Fight would build prototypes and program the game. The mini-games were created to use simple concepts, in order to be easier to code and design.

One of the inspirations for the game's visual style came from a collection of photos "of old, ornate homes from the '50s and '70s" which helped contribute to the game's film noir style. According to Pillow Fight and SmallBü, the gameplay was inspired by Japanese visual novels and the Professor Layton series. The game was created over two years, and features over 80,000 frames of animation. One issue was the memory requirements for each animation, which became an issue when faced with a detailed scene with numerous animated elements. This was eventually fixed by packaging each PNG individually. The game was animated in Toon Boom Harmony, with some post-production work done in Adobe After Effects.

On September 18, 2019, Later Alligator launched for Windows and macOS on Steam and Itch.io. A Linux port followed on December 19 of that year. The game would later receive a port for Nintendo Switch, which was released on March 16, 2021, including a limited physical release through Fangamer. The Switch port included an additional family member and minigame, which were added to the other versions in an update the following month.

== Reception ==
Reception

Aggregate score
Aggregator	Score
OpenCritic	86/100

Review scores
Publication	Score
Adventure Gamers	4.5/5
Nintendo Life	8/10
Nintendo World Report	9.5/10
Computer Games Magazine	9/10

Later Alligator received positive reviews from critics who praised its animation and humor, but criticized some of its mini games as being repetitive. Polygon's Jeff Ramos praised the character interactions as being filled with charming animation and dialogue. Bryce O'Connor, writing for Adventure Gamers, liked the game's locations, saying "Exploring Alligator New York City is a joy, with each screen—from a dusty antique shop to the dark alley in the “unsavory part of town” to an Alligator Memorial Park—featuring fun details and things to interact with".

CGM's Kris Goorhuis liked the game's atmosphere, saying that "The game feels a certain way to look at – classy coffee counters and seedy bars more akin to small-town diners with colourful faces poised to say goofy things".

Nintendo World Report enjoyed the cartoon visuals of Later Alligator, saying that it provided a contrast with the game's film noir aesthetic. The reviewer also gave notice to the dialogue, writing that "interactions with the family are wacky, short conversations that highlight the idiosyncrasies of their individual personalities. Not one identical, and each brings their own brand of humor making the interactions feel unique". Nintendo Life's Kate Gray appreciated the animation style, saying that the game had a "unique style that's full of personality and charm". They criticized some of the minigame controls, saying that the cursor could be hard to control and could result in failing the minigame. Rachel Watts of Rock Paper Shotgun praised the character designs, finding them distinctive and memorable.
