= Zack Keller =

American writer & director (born 1984)

- Born: September 8, 1984 (age 42); Piedmont, California, U.S.
- Education: USC School of Cinematic Arts
- Occupations: Writer; Director
- Years active: 2006–present
- Notable credits: Dick Figures; Dick Figures: The Movie; The Walking Dead: Michonne; Batman: The Telltale Series; Guardians of the Galaxy: The Telltale Series; Unikitty!
- Spouse: Lindsey Lydecker Keller
- Website: zackkeller.com

Zack Keller (born September 8, 1984) is an American writer, director, and former film editor and voice actor. He is the narrative director for the video game Candy Crush Saga at King.com. He is best known for his work on the Mondo Media animated web series Dick Figures (2010–2015), as well as co-writing, co-directing, and co-starring in its film Dick Figures: The Movie, all done alongside his best friend and former business partner Ed Skudder. He also worked as a writer and narrative designer on The Walking Dead: Michonne, Batman: The Telltale Series, Guardians of the Galaxy: The Telltale Series at Telltale Games, and wrote for the animated television series Unikitty!.

Keller is also the author of the Cuphead series of graphic novels published starting in 2020 by Dark Horse Comics and illustrated in 1930s animation style by Shawn Dickinson. He'd also co-write a five-part book series titled Meet Me By The Falls, alongside animator John Dusenberry and filmmaker Ben Tuller.

== Feature films ==
Year	Title	Role	Notes
2006	Cars		Editorial Intern (not credited)
2007	Ratatouille		Editorial Intern (not credited)
2008	WALL-E		Editorial Intern (not credited)
2013	Dick Figures: The Movie	Blue, Jason (Trollz0r), Additional voices	Also co-director, co-writer, editor, compositor
2014	Aachi & Ssipak	Ssipak (English Dub Only)	Co-writer, co-director (English dub only)

== Short films ==
Year	Title	Role	Notes
2007	Lifted		Editorial intern (not credited)
2007	Villains: No Good at Being Bad		Writer and director
2009	Rift		Co-writer

== Television ==
Year	Title	Role	Notes
2010-2015	Dick Figures	Blue, Jason (Trollz0r), Additional Voices	Also co-creator, writer, director, editor, sound designer
2011	Good Vibes		Animatic editor
2012	Electric City		Animatic editor
2012	Duke of Fancy	Duke, various roles	Also co-creator, writer, director, editor, sound designer
2013	SuperFuckers	Rocket Power	
2015	Like, Share, Die		Writer, director
2015	Crash Zoom	Pervert Pal #1	
2020	Unikitty!		Writer

== Video games ==
Year	Title	Role	Notes
2016	The Walking Dead: Michonne		Writer (episode 2)
2016	Batman: The Telltale Series		Writer (episode 1)
2017	Guardians of the Galaxy: The Telltale Series		Writer (episode 1 and 3)
