= Revisioned: Tomb Raider =

American animated web series

- Series opening logo
- Created by: Ricardo Sanchez
- Based on: Tomb Raider by Crystal Dynamics
- Country of origin: United States
- Original language: English
- No. of episodes: 10

Production
- Executive producer: Christopher Peeler
- Producer: Elliot Blake
- Running time: 5-7 minutes
- Production company: GameTap

Original release
- Network: GameTap
- Release: July 10 – November 13, 2007

Revisioned: Tomb Raider (trademarked as Re\Visioned: Lara Croft: Tomb Raider) is an American animated web series created by Ricardo Sanchez and based on the Tomb Raider series. It was released on the Turner Broadcasting's online video game service GameTap from July 10 to November 13, 2007. The series consists of various animation and comic book talents' renditions of Lara Croft, presented in the form of animated episodes. Minnie Driver voices Lara Croft in all episodes. The first three episodes present a linked story arc called "Keys to the Kingdom". Other episodes tell stories of single or multiple episodes that function as an anthology. The art style and storytelling vary in each episode depending on the writer and designer.

== Episodes ==
No.	Title	Designs by	Written by	Original release date
1	"Keys to the Kingdom"	Peter Chung	Peter Chung	July 10, 2007
2	"Keys to the Kingdom"	Peter Chung	Peter Chung	July 11, 2007
3	"Keys to the Kingdom"	Peter Chung	Peter Chung	July 12, 2007
Lara Croft is drawn into a web of religious intrigue and assassins when an archaeologist is murdered just after he claims to have discovered a way to bring the dead back to life.
4	"Revenge of the Aztec Mummy"	David Álvarez	Brian Pulido	July 19, 2007
Hijinks ensue when Lara Croft stumbles upon the resurrection of Moctezuma, an Aztec mummy.
5	"Angel Spit"	Cully Hamner	Warren Ellis	July 26, 2007
6	"Angel Spit"	Cully Hamner	Warren Ellis	July 26, 2007
Lara Croft ventures to Antarctica in search of a mysterious substance that has the capability to cure any disease, but also holding a dark secret as well.
7	"Lara Croft: Legacy"	Ivan Reis	Brian Pulido	August 2, 2007
Lara Croft's search for an ancient scepter leads her to a monastery where she must survive an army of half-man/half-beast creatures.
8	"Pre-Teen Raider"	Six Point Harness	Gail Simone	August 9, 2007
Lara Croft wasn't always one of the world's most successful Tomb Raiders. The episode reveals how a twelve-year-old Lara honed her craft during her early years at the Croft Academy.
9	"Raising Thaumopolis"	Louie del Carmen	Michael A. Stackpole	August 16, 2007
Lara Croft must solve three ancient challenges in order to claim the ultimate prize when she discovers the lost underwater city of Thaumopolis.
10	"A Complicated Woman"	Jim Lee	Jim Lee, Christos N. Gage	November 13, 2007
While recovering the ancient Treasure of Perseus, three fortune hunters tell the tale of how each of them killed Lara Croft... or at least, seemed to.

== Development ==
Inspired by a project called "A Day in the Extra Life" by GameTap, the ReVisioned concept was created to explore and re-imagine well-known video game franchises while telling different stories of video game characters. Lara Croft was chosen for the first of the series. Comic book writers Warren Ellis, Brian Pulido, Peter Chung, Jim Lee and Gail Simone were chosen to write episodes for the season. Lee, a fan of the games, co-wrote the last episode "A Complicated Woman". Simone stated that she was intrigued by Lara Croft for being a strong female character like Wonder Woman. Thus, she was interested in a background story of the character before she became the Tomb Raider, which is reflected in "Pre-Teen Raider". Chung said that he was not familiar to the video games, but explained that he took advantage of the chance to work under ideal conditions and tell the story he wanted. After his research, he realized that Croft was trying to reclaim a relic before someone with a bad plan first reached it, and reversed these roles in the first three episodes. Ellis likened Croft to Allan Quatermain. Pulido, writer of "The Revenge of the Aztec Mummy" and "Lara Croft: Legacy", opined that he was impressed by Croft for being "a hot chick with guns", and he referred to Tex Avery cartoons during the writing process. While the production team had great creative freedom, they were given a basic guideline for the character by the developers so that Lara would not do anything out of character.

=== Potential spin-off ===
In December 2021, Gail Simone revealed on her Twitter that there was a discussion with Warner Bros. about making a series based on the episode she wrote, but nothing came of it as of 2025.
