= Dick Figures: The Movie =

2013 independent animated film

- Promotional release poster
- Directed by: Ed Skudder; Zack Keller
- Written by: Ed Skudder; Zack Keller
- Based on: Dick Figures by: Ed Skudder; Zack Keller
- Produced by: Nick Butera; Andy Fiedler
- Starring: Ed Skudder; Zack Keller; Eric Bauza; Ben Tuller; Shea Carter (Note: Credited as Shea Logsdon.); Mike Nassar; Chad Quandt; Lauren K. Sokolov
- Edited by: Zack Keller (uncredited)
- Music by: Nick Keller
- Production companies: Remochoso; Six Point Harness
- Distributed by: Mondo Media
- Release date: September 17, 2013
- Running time: 73 minutes
- Country: United States
- Language: English
- Budget: Upwards of $313,411
- Box office: $873,987

Dick Figures: The Movie is a 2013 independent American adult animated action comedy film produced by Remochoso and Six Point Harness and distributed by Mondo Media. It is based on the animated web series Dick Figures. The film was written and directed by Ed Skudder and Zack Keller (in their feature directorial debuts) and produced by Nick Butera and Andy Fiedler. Skudder and Keller star as Red and Blue, two best friends and polar opposites who set out on a journey to find the Great Sword of Destiny for the Raccoon in order to save their friendship, Pink's birthday, and the world from Lord Takagami. It also features the voices of Eric Bauza, Ben Tuller, Shea Carter, Mike Nassar, Chad Quandt, and Lauren K. Sokolov.

It is Mondo Media's first feature-length film and independent company 6 Point Harness's first original feature film. The film was released on VOD on September 17, 2013.

Dick Figures: The Movie was split into 12 chapters and published onto YouTube by Mondo's YouTube channel at different times in September. $313,411 was raised through the mass-funding platform Kickstarter from 5,616 backers (including Warren Graff, Fred Seibert, Gundarr creators Corey McDaniel & Ted Wilson, amongst others) through May 31 to July 16, 2012, out of originally a $250,000 goal, breaking the record for the most-funded animation project through the site, until it was surpassed by Blur Studio's The Goon in November 2012, the latter of which remains unreleased as of 2026.

== Plot ==
In a world populated by stick figures, two stick figures named Red and Blue become friends after Red arrives on Earth and saves Blue from a group of bullies. As adults, they live together as roommates. When Blue's girlfriend Pink's birthday approaches, Red suggests that they go see the Raccoon at his pawnshop to get a gift for Pink.

The Raccoon tells them a story of when he lived in ancient Japan. His village fell under attack by Lord Takagami and his demon army. Raccoon, armed with the Sword of Destiny, single-handedly fought the army, but fell into a rage when he saw his wife swallowed by Ocho Muerte, a large octopus. If Blue finds the Sword and returns it to him, he will give Blue the perfect gift for Pink.

Red and Blue arrive in Japan and meet with the Raccoon's son, Son-san. They discover the hilt of the Sword and a large map with the locations of the other pieces, the blade and a jewel. Their retrieval of the hilt awakens Takagami and his ninjas, who give chase. The duo escapes out to sea on a rowboat, where Red reveals he only saved Blue during their childhood so he could impress girls, causing Blue to end their friendship. They eventually end up in the middle of nowhere during an approaching storm. Lightning strikes their boat and a large wave sweeps them away. Shipwrecked on a tropical uninhabited island, they are rescued by alcoholic British pilot Captain Crookygrin. They fly to Paris, and after a police chase, they find the blade of the Sword at the Eiffel Tower, then return home to find the jewel.

Red abandons Blue to go partying. Blue decides to finish the quest alone, only to be captured by Takagami and taken to a nearby volcano where the jewel rests. Takagami reunites the jewel with the Sword and has Blue thrown into the lava. Red and Raccoon arrive just in time and a battle ensues with Red and Blue fighting the ninjas while the Raccoon fights Takagami with the Sword. Cutting off his mask, Raccoon discovers that Father-san is Takagami's real identity. Raccoon beheads him, and his remains fall into the lava, but his head transforms into Ocho Muerte, who heads off to attack their town. Ocho Muerte devours the Raccoon and nearly eats Pink, but not before Blue rescues her with the Sword. The Sword falls into Ocho Muerte's mouth and kills him in an explosion of light. They find Raccoon alive, as well as his wife Mama-san. In return for Blue's bravery, Mama-san gives Blue and Pink the lotus flower that Papa-san once gave to her, blessing their love for each other. Red and Blue celebrate their successful quest.

== Voice cast ==
- Ed Skudder as:
  - Red, Blue's best friend
  - Papa-san "Raccoon", a Japanese wise raccoon that owns a pawn shop called "Ancient Secrets 'n' Things "
  - Captain Crookygrin, a pilot who has alcoholic blindness
  - Mr. Dingleberry, an elderly man, and Red and Blue's landlord
- Zack Keller as:
  - Blue, a levelheaded and serious guy, and Red's best friend
  - Jason "Trollz0r", Red and Blue's next-door neighbor
- Eric Bauza as Lord Takagami, the main antagonist of the movie, as well as the father and rival of his son, Papa-san
- Ben Tuller as Lord Tourettes, a joyful person who has Tourette's syndrome
- Shea Carter as Pink, Blue's girlfriend
- Mike Nassar as Broseph, a bully
- Chad Quandt as Chad-Gendarmerie, a French cop who hunts down Red and Blue to retrieve the Great Sword of Destiny
- Lauren K. Sokolov as Stacy, a promiscuous and uncivilized girl who is Red's girlfriend

== Production ==
For a short time, Ed Skudder and Zack Keller tried approaching studios to make a film based on the series, but backed out after they did not like the way the studios wanted to make the project, and instead turned to Kickstarter to help get the movie made. It was originally set to be a 40-minute-long special, according to the "stretch goals" announced for the Kickstarter campaign, but the film was extended to a length of 73 minutes.

Kickstarter backers David Haley, Brendan Haines, Rob DenBleyker, Dave McElfatrick and Ashley Shelhon were given an animated appearance and actual voice role in the film for their $2,500 pledge contributions.

A book called The Art of Dick Figures: The Movie was written and published by Skudder and Keller onto Amazon.com, in both paperback and Kindle versions. The book depicts some concepts, designs, storyboards and pre-production information of the movie.

== Release ==
The film was released on VOD on September 17, 2013.

One of the film's executive producers, Aaron Simpson, aimed to give everyone access to the film, whether they could afford a paid digital download or not, so the movie was also distributed on YouTube in 12 chapters over the course of 3 months.

The film successfully had a theatrical debut at the Buffer Festival in Toronto on November 9, 2013.

=== Home media ===
Dick Figures: The Movie was released on DVD and Blu-ray in the United States by Cinedigm on December 3, 2013. The film comes with an audio commentary by Ed Skudder and Zack Keller, 5 behind the scenes featurettes, a short featurette starring Ben Tuller as Lord Tourettes and the theatrical trailer.

== Soundtrack ==
"Dick Figures: The Movie: The Song"

Single by Ninja Sex Party
- Released: September 16, 2013
- Recorded: 2011–2012
- Genre: Comedy rock, synth-pop
- Length: 2:00
- Label: Self-released
- Songwriters: Dan Avidan; Brian Wecht
- Producers: Dan Avidan; Brian Wecht

Ninja Sex Party singles chronology
"Unicorn Wizard" (2012)	"Dick Figures: The Movie: The Song" (2013)	"Party of Three" (2013)

The film's soundtrack composed and created by Nick Keller using the software Apple Logic, including the complete score and the movie's closing credits theme, "Dick Figures: The Movie: The Song" performed by Ninja Sex Party, was released on September 16, 2013, one day before the film came out. Music from the original series can be heard in certain parts of the movie. The official "Dick Figures: The Movie: The Song" music video was uploaded on YouTube on April 3, 2014 by Mondo Media's YouTube channel.

== Reception ==
=== Critical reception ===
The film received positive reviews from critics. Critic Mark Bell of Film Threat stated, "It may appear to be as simple an animation as you can get, but it is perfectly executed and extremely entertaining." John Blabber at Bubbleblabber.com gave a positive review saying, "This first entry in the series is a strong and valiant effort by some of the most respected animators in the business. However, it's just that…a movie WRITTEN by animators."

=== Accolades ===
Award	Category	Recipient(s) and nominee(s)	Result
International Film Awards Berlin	Best Animated Film ifab Award	Ed Skudder and Zack Keller	Won

== Sequel ==
In October 2014, Mondo Media announced the development of three new films, including a sequel to Dick Figures: The Movie that would be produced by Bill Schultz through Home Plate Entertainment.

== See also ==
- List of adult animated films
