= Dick Figures =

American adult animated web series

- Red and Blue in the episode "Losing Streakers"
- Genre: Comedy; Adventure; Action
- Created by: Ed Skudder; Zack Keller
- Written by: Ed Skudder; Zack Keller
- Directed by: Ed Skudder; Zack Keller
- Voices of: Ed Skudder; Zack Keller; Shea Carter; Lauren Kay Sokolov; Ben Tuller; Mike Nassar; Chad Quandt
- Theme music composer: Ed Skudder
- Composers: Nick Keller; Ed Skudder; Nick Ainsworth
- Country of origin: United States
- Original language: English
- No. of seasons: 5
- No. of episodes: 54 (List of episodes)

Production
- Executive producer: Chapman Maddox
- Producers: Ed Skudder (uncredited); Zack Keller (uncredited); Andy Fiedler (uncredited)
- Animators: Ed Skudder (lead); Marius Alecse (S1-2); Nick Butera (S1-3); John Dusenberry; Dan Forgione; Brock Gallagher; Adam Rosette (S1-3); Lynn Wang (S3-)
- Editor: Zack Keller
- Running time: 2–6 minutes
- Production companies: 6 Point Harness; Remochoso; Mondo Media

Original release
- Network: YouTube
- Release: November 18, 2010 – November 8, 2015

Dick Figures is an American adult animated web series created by Ed Skudder and Zack Keller and written, directed, and produced by Skudder and Keller. The series, featuring two human-like stick figures named Red and Blue who are best friends, aired for the first time on November 18, 2010. Episodes, which are typically under 4-minutes in length, are distributed on YouTube by Mondo Media. The series is aimed at mature audiences. In 2012, Keller was nominated for an Annie Award for Directing in an Animated Television/Broadcast Production for the episode titled "Kung Fu Winners".

The series, comprising over 50 episodes, has been viewed over 250 million times.

After raising $313,411 on Kickstarter, Dick Figures was eventually given a feature-length comedy adventure film, titled Dick Figures: The Movie. The 73-minute film became available on all major digital platforms on September 17, 2013.

Although some spin-off material was produced in 2015, the original run ended with the final episode of Season 5, "Figured Out", in July 2014.

== Cast and characters ==
=== Main ===
- Red (voiced by Ed Skudder), a red-colored wild and crazy stick figure who is obsessed with partying, drinking, weapons, and sex
- Blue (voiced by Zack Keller), a blue-colored stick figure, is Red's pessimistic, level-headed roommate and his best friend

=== Supporting ===
- Lord Tourettes (voiced by Ben Tuller), a whimsical and effeminate LARPer with Tourette's syndrome, hence his name
- Pink (voiced by Shea Carter), Blue's girlfriend
- Stacy (voiced by Lauren Kay Sokolov), Red's girlfriend
- Mr. Dingleberry (named Nickelberry in "Kitty Amazing" and Alfredberry in "The Fart Knight Rises") (voiced by Ed Skudder), Red and Blue's elderly landlord
- Broseph (voiced by Mike Nassar) is an obnoxious, arrogant bully and the nemesis of Red and Blue
- Purple (Also known as Fat Ugly Girl) (voiced by Ashley Shelhon) is Stacy's obese and silent sister

=== Other voices / guest stars ===
- Sarah Gencarelli
- Stephen M. Levinson
- Samantha Scharff
- Kate McCabe
- Eric Bauza
- John Dusenberry
- Rafael Hurtado
- Brendan Burch
- Brock Gallagher
- Dave Vamos
- Austin Madison
- Arlene Ramirez
- Lynn Wang
- Nick Ainsworth
- Nick Keller
- Andrea Fernandez
- Thomas Ridgewell
- Kenn Navarro

== Episodes ==
| Season | Episodes | Originally released | |
| Season | Episodes | First released | Last released |
|---|---|---|---|
| Pilot | | September 2010 | |
| 1 | 10 | November 18, 2010 | March 24, 2011 |
| 2 | 10 | April 21, 2011 | August 25, 2011 |
| 3 | 10 | September 22, 2011 | January 26, 2012 |
| 4 | 10 | April 5, 2012 | August 2, 2012 |
| Movie | 12 | September 17, 2013 | December 2, 2013 |
| 5 | 11 | August 27, 2013 | July 10, 2014 |
| M.w.S. | 3 | October 4, 2015 | November 8, 2015 |
