= Mondo Media =

American independent multimedia company

Mondo Media, Inc.
- Logo used since 2016
- Formerly: Mechadeus (1993–1996)
- Type: Private
- Industry: Entertainment
- Founded: 1988; 38 years ago
- Founders: John Evershed; Deirdre O'Malley
- Headquarters: San Francisco, California
- Key people: Brendan Burch (CEO); Deirdre O'Malley (DBD); Christina Chavez (CMO); Douglas S. Kay (CFO)
- Products: Web series; Television programs; Video games; Movies; Music videos
- Services: Branding; Promotion; Commercials
- Subsidiaries: 6 Point Harness; Mondo Mojo; Mondo Studios; Mondo Mini Shows (defunct)
- Website: www.mondomedia.com

Mondo Media, Inc. is an American independent multimedia company that mainly produces online independent animation aimed at mature audiences. It was founded in 1988 by John Evershed and Deirdre O'Malley in San Francisco, California. (Note: "MONDOMEDIA - Main". Mondo Media. Archived from the original on December 2, 1998.)

Mondo's most successful and popular productions are Happy Tree Friends, which has since spawned a multimedia franchise; and Dick Figures, which was adapted into a feature-length film and was nominated for an Annie Award.

According to AdAge Magazine in January 2013, Mondo Media was the top-ranked and all-time most popular YouTube channel, with 1.3 billion views and 1.3 million subscribers. In July of 2021, the official website itself was blocked in Russia due to the Roskomnadzor banning the animated series Happy Tree Friends.

== History ==
The company initially created content for various tech companies, before developing two video games, Critical Path in 1993 and The Daedalus Encounter in 1995, under the name Mechadeus. In the latter half of the 1990s, Mondo refocused on producing internet-based animation, under name Mondo Mini Shows, which became the company's main business.

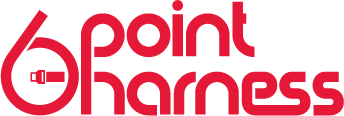
6 Point Harness, Mondo Media's production label for film and television

In 2013, Canadian channel Bite teamed up with Mondo Media and YouTube to create Bite on Mondo, a program in which content creators pitched ideas for new shows. The pitches are funded through Mondo and use YouTube's popularity to decide whether or not they will be picked up. The winning pitches were broadcast on Bite on August 29, 2014.

In October 2014, Blue Ant Media, along with Mondo Media and Corus Entertainment announced that Teletoon would air a new series featuring shorts from the program. It was expected to premiere in 2016 on Teletoon at Night, but instead premiered on September 4, 2015 as Night Sweats on Adult Swim Canada.

In 2015, Mondo Media produced the sketch comedy series Like, Share, Die for Fusion, consisting of several short segments and episodes of Mondo-produced web series.

On September 19, 2016, it was announced that 6 Point Harness will be merged with Mondo Media, with Mondo Media as the surviving entity; Mondo would produce its television shows with the 6 Point Harness label, while maintaining their original name for consumer-facing activities and distribution of their web series. 6 Point Harness' founder and CEO Brendan Burch would replace John Evershed as the CEO of Mondo Media, though Evershed remains on the board of directors of the company.

In May 2019, El Rey Network aired an anthology of Mondo series called the Mondo Animation Hour.

== Television shows ==
=== Mondo Media ===
Title	Year(s)	Network
Happy Tree Friends	2006	G4
Like, Share, Die	2015	Fusion TV
Night Sweats	2015	Adult Swim
Lastman (Season 1)	2017	VRV
Gary and His Demons	2018–22	VRV (season 1); Amazon Prime Video (season 2)

== Web series ==
Title	Year(s)	Created by	Description
4th Period Lunch	2012	Ilana Cohn and Tyler Spiers	Seven episodes aired during November and December 2012.
Archeologists	2014	Bart Batchelor and Chris Nielsen	Prologue series to World Doctors.
Allen's Pole	2018	Kevin Lee	4 episodes aired on VRV, and has been released on YouTube in 2020.
Absolute Zero	2000–2001	Sandy Smallens, Anne Beatts and Greg Beato	At least 32 episodes were released on the Mondo Mini Shows website as well as GetMusic.com.
The Alien Guide to Earth	2019	Chris Korwawski and 1A4 Studio	10 episodes aired on VRV.
Bad Hybrid	2012	Animax Interactive	Six episodes aired between May and September 2012.
Baman Piderman	2009–present	Alex and Lindsay Small-Butera	2 seasons of episodes aired and was often seen as one of Mondo's most popular shows. The creators co-operated on the series, Dick Figures.
The Bedfellows	2013–present	Rob Schuldt and Kris Patrick	Various episodes have been shown on the Mondo Media channel after originally appearing on the Bedfellows channel.
Behind the Music that Sucks	2001	Dave Carson and Simon Assad	Made in partnership with Heavy.
BigFish	2009	BigFish.tv	Five episodes aired between July and September 2009.
Billy and the Bitch	2012	Dave Carter	Nine episodes, including a claymation Christmas special, aired between March and December 2012.
Body Whispers	2016	Michael Johnson	3 episodes aired on YouTube.
Black and White	2009	John Izen	41 episodes aired between February and July 2009.
Brogan: Master of Castles	2019–present	House of Ten	6 episodes aired on VRV after pilot release on YouTube.
Bubbles and Me	2012	Hamilton Craig and Brian Muelhaupt	A pilot was shown in May 2012, and two following episodes aired in September and October the same year.
City in Crisis	2015–2016	Kevin Pavlovic and Ellery VanDooyeweert	Ten episodes were released.
Candy Hole	2009–2010	Brian Frisk	Six episodes aired between May 2009 and October 2010.
Cat Slap	2009–2012	Alan Foreman	Six episodes aired between September 2009 and April 2010, with an additional episode shown May 2012.
Chainmail Bikini Squad	2012	Melanie Albert and Geremy Walker	Seven episodes aired between May and October 2012.
Daddy and the Big Boy	2018–present	Bart Batchelor and Chris Nielsen	Premiered on VRV in March 2018, before being uploaded to YouTube on November 11.
D_Void	2014–2015	Kenn Navarro and Warren Graff	2 episode aired on Zwak, until rereleased on Mondo. Co-production with ZwakAttack
Deep Space 69	2012–2018	Daniel Katz	A total of thirty-four series episodes and five specials were released, three of the episodes Siren of Tetons and Galactic Bonesman in Season One and Astro Past Blast in Season Two were each presented as three part episodes which were each combined into single episodes for the digital download release. Kids in the Hall alumnus Kevin McDonald joined in Season 4 as robot sidekick P3-NIS.
Destructo Box	2011–2012	Joey Reinisch and Phil McLaughlin	Season one, containing 27 full episodes, have been shown during 2011. Season two was announced but as of 2016 has either been scrapped or in development hell. Reinisch and McLaughlin's first Mondo series, before Game Program Attack.
Dick Figures	2010–2015	Ed Skudder and Zack Keller	Five full seasons have been shown. Dick Figures: The Movie is the first feature-length film co-produced and released by Mondo.
Dirty Shorts	2012	Dan Avidan	Mondo's only live action show.
DJs in PJs	2012	Dan Avidan and Brian Wecht	Two episodes aired during June and July 2012.
Dr. Tran	2008–2010	Breehn Burns and Jason Johnson	Ten episodes aired during 2009 (the earliest episode "Here Comes Dr. Tran!" was created in 2003), followed by seven episodes of Dr. Tran Fan Mail shown in 2009 and 2010. Aired on G4's Late Night Peep Show. Co-production with Lone Sausage Productions.
Elmo Aardvark: Outer Space Detective	2000	Will Ryan	25 episodes were put onto the Mondo Mini Shows website made in collaboration with Snappytoons and Renegade Animation.
Emergency 411	2010	Tim Heiderich	Two episodes aired in April 2010.
Fan Art Fridays	2013	Mondo Media	10 episodes aired between February and May 2013. Exclusive to the Mondo Media website.
Fanboy Rampage	2010	Davor Bujakovic and Junaid Chundrigar	Three episodes aired during September and October 2010.
Forest City Rockers	2010	Jim Dirschberger and Jay Howell	Three episodes aired during June and July 2010.
Fot & Angus	2011–2012	Alex Dron	Eight episodes aired between May 2011 and August 2012.
Fuggy Fuggy	2009–2010	Greg McLeod and Myles McLeod	Eight episodes aired between February 2009 and January 2010.
Game Program Attack	2012	Joey Reinisch and Phil McLaughlin	Thirteen episodes aired between April and November 2012. Reinisch and McLaughlin's second Mondo series, after Destructo Box.
GameStain	2012–2013	Jordan Allen-Dutton	Ten episodes aired on FatFinger channel, it was animated by Domics.
Gary the Rat	2003	Mark and Robb Cullen	They developed the web series version.
Ginger Orphan Playhouse	2014–2019	Aaron Chrenen & Ben Lepley	Eleven episode ran 2014 to 2019
The God & Devil Show	1999–2000	Aubrey Ankrum	54 episodes were created in 1999 and 2000, with ten being aired on YouTube in 2008.
Goodbye Kitty	2011	Todd Goldman	Ten episodes aired September and December 2011.
Goodwin vs. Badwin	2012	Joshua Bowen and Peter Burton	Eight episodes aired between March and November 2012. Bowen and Burton's first Mondo series, before Mrs. Brickles.
Gundarr	2011–2015	Corey McDaniel and Ted Wilson	38 episodes were aired between 1 June 2011 and 25 November 2015. It is seen as one of Mondo's most popular shows.
Ham Radio	2012	Ryan Hernandez and Kurt Duggan	Five episodes aired between October and November 2012.
Happy Tree Friends	2000–present	Aubrey Ankrum, Rhode Montijo, and Kenn Navarro	The pioneer show for Mondo, with 108 regular episodes along with 13 episodes in the TV series.
Hard Drinkin' Lincoln	2000–2002	Mike Reiss	Two episodes aired in July 2007 on Mondo's YouTube channel with 16 episodes in total. Co-production with Icebox.
Heavy Metal Guy	2000	Jason Sadler	Six episodes were produced in 2000; four episodes aired between March 2007 and March 2009 on Mondo's YouTube channel.
High Kittie	2010–2011	Gary Doodles	Two episodes aired during December 2010 and January 2011.
Inspector Beaver	2001	David Feiss	Two episodes aired during 2001.
Joe Cartoon	1998–present	Joseph C. Shields	Began being shown on Mondo's website in 2012. Originally aired on Mondo as early as 2009.
Julius and Friends	2000-2002	Paul Frank	26 episodes were put onto Mondo’s website and was made in collaboration with Zeros and Ones Studio.
KA-POW!	2003–2008	Aubrey Ankrum, Rhode Montijo and Kenn Navarro	Spin-off to Happy Tree Friends. Six episodes have been shown during February and March 2009.
Kung Fu Karl	2012–2013	Mike Parker and Michael William	27 episodes have been shown between February 2012 and June 2013. Co-production with Lowbrow Studios.
Kevin Spencer	2001	Greg Lawrence	Remakes of the thirteen 1998 shorts on Burly Bear.
LarkMart	2010	Aaron Simpson	Four episodes aired between February and July 2010.
Larva	2012–2014	Synergy Media	Over 91 episodes have aired between the 2010s.
Like, News	1999–2001	Don Asmussen	Eleven episodes aired on Mondo Media’s YouTube page during October and November 2008. During the series original run it ran on Mondo Media’s website throughout 1999-2001 with at least 80 episodes.
Merci Satan	2012	Laurent Sarfati and Jérémie Périn	Four episodes aired between July and September 2012
Mrs. Brickles	2012	Joshua Bowen and Peter Burton	Three episodes aired during June and July 2012. Spin off of Goodwin vs. Badwin.
Mr. Wong	2009–2010	Pam Brady and Kyle McCulloch	Five three-part episodes aired April 2009 and March 2010.
NewsHit	2012	Nick DenBoer and Davy Force	12 episodes aired between January and October 2012.
Oliver Age 24	2013	Oliver Hindle	Mondo Partnered channel began airing February 2013.
Off the Curb	2012	Carlos Alazraqui, Cedric Yarbrough, John Di Maggio, Fred Tatasciore and Gary Anthony Williams	Five episodes aired between July and October 2012. Stars the voices of Carlos Alazraqui, Cedric Yarbrough, John DiMaggio, Fred Tatasciore and Gary Anthony Williams
Parenthesis Humor	2015	Stephen Sloan	Three episodes aired between August and December 2015.
Papercuts	2012	Alex Horan and Johnny Chew	Three episodes aired between May and August 2012.
Piki & Poko: Adventures in StarLand	1999–2001	David Cutler, Evie Leder and Mark Ewert	27 episodes aired from 1999 to 2001.
Poker Night	2000	Rob Greenberg and Bill Corbett	Eight episodes aired in 2000 and was co-produced with Icebox.
Post Nuclear Family	2012	Rich Moyer	Seven episodes aired between March and October 2012.
Queer Duck	2000-2002	Mike Reiss	20 episodes were made and put on the Mondo Mini Shows website in collaboration with Icebox and aired on Showtime.
Raised by Zombies	2012–2013	Mati Chavez	Seven episodes aired between August 2012 and June 2013.
Sketched Out	2012	Mondo Media	A series of seven episodes aired during August and September 2012, with how-to draw tutorials by various Mondo Media creators.
Skill Me Now	2012	Dan Milano	Six episodes aired between May and September 2012.
Sports Buzz	1999	Tom Tolbert	Two episodes were aired in 1999.
Stick Girl	2001-2002	Bruce Simpson	19 episodes were made and put onto the Mondo Mini Shows website.
Super Celery Man	2012	Kieran Sugrue	Four episodes aired between March and July 2012, followed by a Christmas special on December that year.
TAC	2010	Michel Beaudet	English dub of Têtes à claques. Eight episodes aired between March and October 2010.
Tech Sergeant	1998	Aubrey Ankrum	One of the first Mondo Mini Shows ever created.
Terrificland	2014-2015	Dan Dillabough	Ten episodes aired between July 2014 and August 2015.
Two-Bit	2014–2015	Kenn Navarro and Warren Graff	6 episode aired on Zwak, until rereleased on Mondo. Co-production with ZwakAttack
Thugs on Film	1999–2001	Dan Todd	Originally was available to watch in its entirety on the Mondo Mini Shows website throughout 1999-2001. Five episodes aired on YouTube throughout 2007-2008.
Trailer Trash	2011	Max Benator and Todd Goldman	Fourteen episodes aired between June and December 2011.
This Modern World	2000–2001	Tom Tomorrow	Based on comic strip of the same name and was made in collaboration with FlickerLab.
Trapped in Technology	2012	Rob Manuel	Five episodes aired during June and August 2012.
Turbo Fantasy	2012–2018	David Ferguson	Seven episodes aired between May and December 2012. A 2nd season premiered on VRV on August 27, 2018.
Video Game Therapist	2012	Mike McCafferty	Three episodes aired between June and November 2012.
War Soldiers	2012–2013	Joey Reinisch and Phil McLaughlin	Four episodes aired between in November 2012 to July 2013. Spin off of Game Program Attack. Co-production with Machinima
World Doctors	2014–2015	Bart Batchelor & Chris Nielsen	25 episodes have aired to date, in addition to many short supplemental videos including World Doctors Outreach.
Zombie College	2000	Eric Kaplan	Eleven episodes aired between October 2000 in co-production with Icebox. Features the voice talent of David Herman (King of the Hill, Beavis and Butt-head), Pamela Segall (King of the Hill, Recess), John DiMaggio (Futurama, Adventure Time) and Billy West (Futurama, The Ren & Stimpy Show).

=== Failed pilots ===
Show	Pilot Name	Year(s)
Ad Wizards	"Pilot"	2012
Book 'Em Nerdo	"Forget it, Ryu. It's Chinatown"	2012
Blood Alley	"Potato Babies"	2015
Beaver Tails	"Pilot"	2016
Dallas Heck	"Pilot"	2012
Duck Weed	"The Boonies"	2012
Explosion Force	"Pilot"	2012
Frankly Frank	"My Eyes are Up Here"	2012
Going Nowhere	"Teen Wolf Lady Magnet"	2012
I, Pineapple	"Pilot"	2012
The Line	"Plane Driver"	2014
Miami Mermaids	"Pilot"	2012
Mineshaft	"Worm God"	2012
Murder House	"Welcome to Murder House"	2014
Neanderlulz	"Pilot"	2012
NPC	"Pilot"	2017
Phil M.D	"The Doctor is In"	2015
Slash 'Em	"Pilot"	2012
Spiral	"Pilot"	2001
Star Jerks	"Pilot"	2012
Suck Tower	"The Suck"	2012
SUPERSTUPID	"Pilot"	2012
Sock Me Off	"Pilot"	2016
Vileville	"Pilot"	2012
Villain Complex	"Pilot"	2012
Work Horse	"Busted"	2012
Youth Troop Tommy	"Pilot"	2012
Teddy Sushi	"Pilot"	2015
Trailer Court	"Trailer Trash Justice"	2000
Witches	"Witches Aint S**t"	2015

== Feature films ==
Title	Year(s)	Director(s)	Co-production companies	Notes
Dick Figures: The Movie	2013	Ed Skudder; Zack Keller	6 Point Harness; Remochoso	
Aachi & Ssipak	2014	Jo Beom-jin (original version); Ed Skudder; Zack Keller (English dub)	Studio 2.0; JTeam Studios	English dub only
Nova Seed	2017	Nick DiLiberto	Gorgon Pictures; House of Cool	

== Graphic and art design ==
Show/Channel	Year(s)	Creator/Developer/Publisher	Description
Centipede	1998	Leaping Lizard Software; Hasbro Interactive	Video game
Zoog Disney	1998–2002	Drew Takahashi	Programming block produced for Disney Channel. First season co-produced with Colossal Pictures.

== Video games ==
Title	Year(s)	Publishers/Co-developer(s)	Platform(s)
Critical Path	1993	Media Vision	Microsoft Windows, Macintosh
The Daedalus Encounter	1995	Virgin Interactive Entertainment; Panasonic	Microsoft Windows, Macintosh, 3DO
Toonstruck	1996	Virgin Interactive Entertainment	DOS
Happy Tree Friends: False Alarm	2008	Stainless Games; Sega	Microsoft Windows; Xbox 360
Happy Tree Friends: Slap Happy	2009		iOS
Happy Tree Friends: Deadeye Derby	2014		iOS; Android
The Crackpet Show: Happy Tree Friends Edition	2023	Ravenage Games; Vixa Games	Steam; GOG.com; Epic Games; Xbox One; Xbox Series X/S; PS4; PS5; Nintendo Switch
