= List of web series =

This is a list of notable web series (also known as short-form series) organized alphabetically by name.

== Numbers and symbols ==
- #Adulting
- 1 Man's Treasure
- 7 First Kisses
- 18 to 35
- The 21 Conspiracy
- The 410

== A ==
- A World Without
- Action Faction
- Adulthood (L'Âge adulte)
- After Trek
- Afterworld
- Agents of S.H.I.E.L.D.: Slingshot
- Ahmed and Salim
- Alien: Isolation – The Digital Series
- A.I.SHA My Virtual Girlfriend
- All-for-nots
- All in the Method
- All My Children (2013 revival on TOLN)
- Angel of Death
- Angry Video Game Nerd
- Animator vs. Animation
- Annoying Orange
- Anyone But Me
- Apharan
- Ark
- Arkansas Traveler
- Art of the Drink
- A Shared House
- Ashens
- Ask a Ninja
- Asur
- A-Teen
- A-Teen 2
- Atop The Fourth Wall
- Average Betty
- Avocado Toast

== B ==
- Backpackers
- Backrooms
- Baked
- Band Ladies
- Battle for Dream Island
- Battlefield Friends
- The Bannen Way
- Barbie: Life in the Dreamhouse
- Battlestar Galactica: Blood & Chrome
- Battlestar Galactica: Razor Flashbacks
- Battlestar Galactica: The Resistance
- Battlestar Galactica: The Face of the Enemy
- Becoming Human
- Beckinfield
- BedHead
- Bee and Puppycat
- Behind the Music that Sucks
- Best in Miniature
- Betaal
- Between Two Ferns with Zach Galifianakis
- Bewafaa sii Wafaa
- Bit Playas
- Birchpunk
- BloggingHeads
- Blow Up
- Bose: Dead/Alive
- Boygiri
- Boys to Manzo
- Bratz
- Bratzillaz (webisodes)
- Bravest Warriors
- Break a Leg
- Breathe
- Broad Appeal: Living with E's
- Brown Girls
- Burning Love
- But I'm Chris Jericho!
- BuzzFeed Unsolved

== C ==
- Camp Camp
- Canadiana
- Capitol Hill
- Carmilla
- Cartoon Cartoons
- Casual
- CELL: The Web Series
- Chad Vader
- Chance
- Chateau Laurier
- Chicken Girls
- Chikn Nuggit
- Childrens Hospital
- Choco Bank
- Chop Socky Boom
- Chop Shop
- Chuparsky University
- Clark and Michael
- Classic Alice
- Class of 2017
- Clutch
- Codefellas
- Coming Out
- Compulsions
- Consolevania
- Copy & Pastry
- Cows Come Home
- Crash Course
- The Crew (2007 webseries)
- Critical Role
- CTRL
- CyberSquad

== D ==
- Damaged
- Danger 5 (The Diamond Girls)
- Dan The Man
- DC Super Hero Girls
- Dead Fantasy
- Death Battle
- Decoys
- Defunctland
- Deleted - The Game
- Detention Adventure
- DeVanity
- Dev DD
- Dhimaner Dinkaal
- Dick Figures
- Did You Know Gaming?
- Difficult People
- Diggnation
- Diva Starz
- Do Not Track
- Don't Hug Me I'm Scared
- Doctor Who: TARDISODES
- Doraleous & Associates
- Dorm Life
- Dr. Horrible's Sing-Along Blog
- Dr. Tran
- Dragon Age: Redemption

== E ==
- Eddsworld
- Easy to Assemble
- EastSiders
- Electric City
- Eli's Dirty Jokes
- Elite
- El Guapo vs. The Narco Vampires
- EPIC FU
- Epic Chef
- Epic Rap Battles of History
- Equals Three with Ray William Johnson
- Escape to the Movies with MovieBob
- Exo Next Door
- Everybody's Meg
- Everyone's Famous

== F ==
- Fak Yaass
- (Fear the Walking Dead) Dead in the Water
- Fear the Walking Dead: Flight 462
- Fear the Walking Dead: Passage
- (Fear the Walking Dead) The Althea Tapes
- Feed Me Bubbe
- Five Points
- For the Record
- Foreign Body
- Fred Figglehorn (FRED)
- Fred Has Problems
- Freezerburns
- Friends from College
- Fu@K I Love U

== G ==
- Game Grumps
- Gameoverse
- Gandii Baat
- Gemini Division
- Gen:Lock
- Ghost BFF
- Ghosting with Luke Hutchie and Matthew Finlan
- Gil Next Door
- Girltrash
- Godspeed
- Go-Go Boy Interrupted
- Good Mythical Morning
- Good Cops
- Goodwin vs. Badwin
- Gorgeous Tiny Chicken Machine Show
- Gotham Girls
- Guidestones
- Guidance
- Gundarr

== H ==
- H+: The Digital Series
- Half-Life VR but the AI is Self-Aware
- Halo 4: Forward Unto Dawn
- Halo: Nightfall
- Hanazuki: Full of Treasures
- Happy Hour with Elliott Morgan
- Happy Tree Friends
- Happy Hour Tales
- HarmonQuest
- Hard Drinkin' Lincoln
- Haters Back Off
- Havana Elsa
- Hearts and Hari
- Heeramandi
- Helluva Boss
- Her Story
- Here & Queer
- Herne Katha
- Hero Envy
- Hey Lady!
- Hide and Seek, an on-line episode of Eureka
- Homicide: Second Shift
- Homestar Runner
- Hometown Baghdad
- Hoodies Squad
- Horace and Pete
- Hospital Show
- How to Buy a Baby
- How to Fail as a Popstar
- Human Kind Of
- Humans of New York: The Series
- Huevocartoon
- The Hunted
- Husbands

== I ==
- I Hate People, People Hate Me
- I Heart Vampires
- I Kissed a Vampire
- Imaginary Bitches
- Immersion
- Infinite Ryvius: Illusion (2000)
- Inside
- In Gayle We Trust
- Italian Spiderman
- It's a Small World: The Animated Series
- IvoryTower

== J ==
- Jake and Amir
- Jet Lag: The Game
- JourneyQuest
- JustSaying

== K ==
- Karagar
- Kamen Rider Amazons
- Kamen Rider Black Sun
- Karrle Tu Bhi Mohabbat
- KateModern
- Killer Bean
- Kirill
- Knights of Guinevere

== L ==
- Leap Year
- Lego Hidden Side
- Less Than Kosher
- Letterkenny Problems
- LG15: The Last
- LG15: The Resistance
- LG15: Outbreak
- Lido TV
- Liverspots and Astronots
- Loafy
- Local 58
- LOL
- lonelygirl15
- Lost: Missing Pieces (webisodes)
- Love, Death & Robots

== M ==
- Mahou Yuugi (Magical Play)
- Making Fiends
- Malice: The Webseries
- Man vs Bee
- Mantecoza
- Marble Hornets
- Mary and Flo On the Go!
- Masameer
- MechWest
- Meta Runner
- Middle Class Matt
- Milky Subway: The Galactic Limited Express
- Ming's Dynasty
- Miraculous Chibi
- Mission Backup Earth
- The Missus Downstairs
- Mittens & Pants
- Monster High
- Mortal Kombat: Legacy
- Mr. Deity
- Mr. Freeman
- Mr. Know-It-All
- Mr. Men Little Miss Mini Adventures
- Mr. Wong
- MrBeast Lab
- Murder in Passing
- Murder Drones
- My 90-Year-Old Roommate
- My Alibi
- My Dead Mom
- My Life as a Video Game
- MyMusic
- My Scene

== N ==
- N1ckola
- New Eden
- NH6
- Nirvana the Band the Show
- Nostalgia Critic

== O ==
- Oddbods
- Old Dogs & New Tricks
- Ollie & Scoops
- Om Nom Stories
- One Sunny Day
- Orange Juice in Bishops Garden
- Out With Dad
- OzGirl

== P ==
- PANICS
- PBC
- Pencilmation
- peopleWatching
- Permanent Roommates
- Petrol
- PG Porn
- Pillow Talks
- Pini
- Pioneer One
- Pittsburgh Dad
- Pocoyo
- Poolside Chats
- Poor Paul
- Pop-Up Porno
- Potter Puppet Pals
- Power Rangers Hyperforce
- Prank Lab
- Pretty Dirty Secrets
- Pretty Pretty Please I Don't Want to Be a Magical Girl
- Private
- Prom Queen
- Pugatory
- Pure Pwnage

== Q ==
- Quarterlife
- Queen America
- Queens
- Queer Duck
- Querencia

== R ==
- Rabbits
- Ragini MMS: Returns
- Ragged Isle
- RCVR
- React
- Reality On Demand
- Recess Therapy
- Recorded by Arizal
- Red Bird
- Red Table Talk
- Red vs. Blue
- Remember, Hari
- Revenge of the Black Best Friend
- RhettandLinKast
- Rich Keeble Vanity Project
- Riese the Series
- Ritals
- Romil & Jugal
- Rose by Any Other Name...
- Rostered On
- Ruby Skye PI
- Running With Violet
- RWBY
- RWBY Chibi

== S ==
- Salad Fingers
- SamHas7Friends
- Samurai! Daycare
- SMBC Theater
- Scott the Woz
- Scrubs interns
- Settle Down
- Sexy Herpes
- Shadazzle
- Shankaboot
- Shit Girls Say
- Simon's Cat
- Skibidi Toilet
- Slo Pitch
- Sloppy Jones
- Smosh Babies
- Social Disorder
- Sofia's Diary
- Something Remote
- Sorority Forever
- Soup of the Day
- Space Adventure Legend Quest
- Space Janitors
- Space Riders: Division Earth
- Spellfury
- Squaresville
- Squad 85
- Star-ving
- Star Trek: Short Treks
- Starship Regulars
- Statler and Waldorf: From the Balcony
- Stories from My Gay Grandparents
- Strangers
- Strawberry Shortcake: Berry in the Big City
- Streams Flow from a River
- Street Fighter: Assassin's Fist
- Street Fighter: Resurrection
- SuperFuckers
- Sun Chaser

== T ==
- Tabletop
- Tainted Love
- Talking Tom and Friends
- Talking Friends
- Tales of Zale
- Tagged
- Tastebuds NYC
- Teenagers
- Tekzilla (video podcast)
- Ten Little Roosters
- The Adventures of a Sexual Miscreant
- The Adventures of Noko Mashaba
- The Art of Murder
- The Amazing Digital Circus
- The Amazing Gayl Pile
- The Bacca Chronicles
- The Bloody Mary Show
- The Book of Jer3miah
- The Communist's Daughter
- The Drop
- The Eleven Little Roosters
- The Girls on Film
- The God & Devil Show
- The Goddamn George Liquor Program
- The Guild
- The Land of Boggs
- The Legend of Neil
- The Legion of Extraordinary Dancers
- The Mandela Catalogue
- The Mercury Men
- The Miley and Mandy Show
- The Mimi & Flo Show
- The Mis-Adventures of Awkward Black Girl
- The Neddeaus of Duqesne Island
- The Normal Mfer
- The Outs
- The Philip DeFranco Show
- The Plateaus
- The Ready Room
- The Room Actors: Where Are They Now? A Mockumentary
- The Strangerhood
- The Stockholms
- The Swines
- The Test Case
- The Variants
- The Walking Dead: Cold Storage
- (The Walking Dead) The Oath
- (The Walking Dead) Red Machete
- The Walking Dead: Torn Apart
- The Writers' Block
- This Blows
- Thug Notes
- Thugs on Film
- Tiki Bar TV
- Tiny Fuppets
- Toyboize
- Transformers: Cyber Missions
- Trenches
- Turnt
- TVF Pitchers
- TVF Tripling

== U ==
- Urban Wolf

== V ==
- Valemont
- Venice: The Series
- Verity
- Video Game High School
- Viral
- Vixen
- Voyage Trekkers

== W ==
- Wainy Days
- We Broke Up
- Weekend Pussy Hunt
- We Need Girlfriends
- Web Therapy
- Where the Bears Are
- WHIH Newsfront
- Will It Blend?
- Wonder Quest
- Writers
- WWE Mixed Match Challenge

== Y ==
- Yarob
- Yeh Meri Family
- You're My Hero
- Your Two Cents

== Z ==
- Zarqa
- Zero Punctuation
- Zoe Valentine
- Zombie College

== See also ==
- List of animated Internet series
