= Pillow Talk (disambiguation) =

Pillow Talk is a 1959 film directed by Michael Gordon.

Pillow talk is an intimate conversation between lovers which typically takes place in bed.

"Pillowtalk" is a 2016 song by Zayn Malik.

Pillow Talk or Pillowtalk may also refer to:

== Television ==
- Pillow Talk (Canadian TV series), a 2022 sketch comedy program
- Pillow Talk (Singaporean TV series), a 2012 Chinese-language drama
- Pillow Talks, a 2009 comedy web series
- "Pillow Talk" (Blue Heelers), a 2004 episode
- "Pillow Talk" (The Green Green Grass), a 2005 episode
- "Pillow Talk" (The Upper Hand), a 1992 episode

== Literature ==
- Pillow Talk, a novelization of the 1959 film by Marvin Albert
- Pillow Talk, a 2007 novel by Freya North
- Pillow Talk, a 1997 novel by Kristine Rolofson

== Music ==
=== Albums ===
- Pillow Talk (Miki Howard album), 2006
- Pillow Talk (Tink album), by Tink, 2022
- Pillow Talk, by Pieces of a Dream, 2006
- Pillow Talk, by Sylvia Robinson, or the title song (see below), 1973

=== Songs ===
- "Pillow Talk" (song), by Sylvia Robinson, 1973
- "Pillow Talk", by Doris Day from the film Pillow Talk, 1959
- "Pillow Talk", by The Killing Tree, 2000
- "Pillow Talk", by Wet Leg from the album Moisturizer, 2025
- "Pillowtalk", by Isolée from We Are Monster, 2005

== See also ==
- Pillow Talk 101, a 2006 EP by Faster Faster
- "Pillow Talkin'", a 2019 song by Tyler Joe Miller
- "Pillow Talking", a song by Lil Dicky from Professional Rapper, 2015
