= Sophie Tilson =

Australian actress, writer and producer

- Born: Melbourne, Australia
- Occupations: Actress, writer, producer
- Years active: 2008–present

Sophie Tilson is an Australian actress, writer and producer. She was one of the stars of the 2009 web series OzGirl. She is perhaps best known for playing the character Lisa Devine on the Australian soap opera Neighbours. Her first screenplay, Wrong Swipe, which she wrote with her partner, Shanrah Wakefield, was scheduled to be released February 10, 2016 on Lifetime.

== Early life ==
Tilson grew up in Melbourne where she attended University High school. She studied at the Victorian College of the Arts and the Swinburne University of Technology where she received a degree in Media, Communication, and Literature.

== Career ==
In 2009, Tilson starred in the Australia-based web series, OzGirl. The series won several awards including best actor at the 4th Annual ITVfest, which Tilson shared with her co-star Shanrah Wakefield as well as the Streamy Award for best foreign web series.

In 2010, she played the role of Lisa Devine on the Australian soap opera Neighbours.

In 2014, she appeared in the Ion Television original holiday movie, Merry Ex-Mas opposite Kristy Swanson.

In 2015, her screenplay for the movie, Swipe, which she wrote with her former OzGirl co-star, Shanrah Wakefield, was produced for Lifetime TV and is scheduled to air later this year. The film has recently been re titled Wrong Swipe and is scheduled to air February 10, 2016.

== Filmography ==
Year	Title	Role	Notes
2009	OzGirl	Sadie Brown	Web series
2010	Neighbours	Lisa Devine	
2012	Awkward	Julie #2	Episode: "Pick Me, Choose Me, Love Me"
2013	Dracano	Petra	
2014	The Wedding Pact	Tess	
2014	Crimes of the Mind	Shirley	
2014	Merry Ex-Mas	Mindy	
2014	Parched	Sophie	Short
2016	The Picture	Hippy Girl	1 episode
2017	Hot Explicit Ladies	Saffie James	TV Movie
2021	Kidnapped	Eve	TV Movie
2021	This Little Love of Mine	Olivia	

== Awards and recognitions ==
- ITVfest
  - 2009 Best actor for OzGirl
  - 2009 Best web series for OzGirl
- Streamy Awards Best foreign web series for OzGirl
- Additional Recognitions
  - 2009 WebSeriesToday Breakout star award
