= Shanrah Wakefield =

Australian Writer and Actress

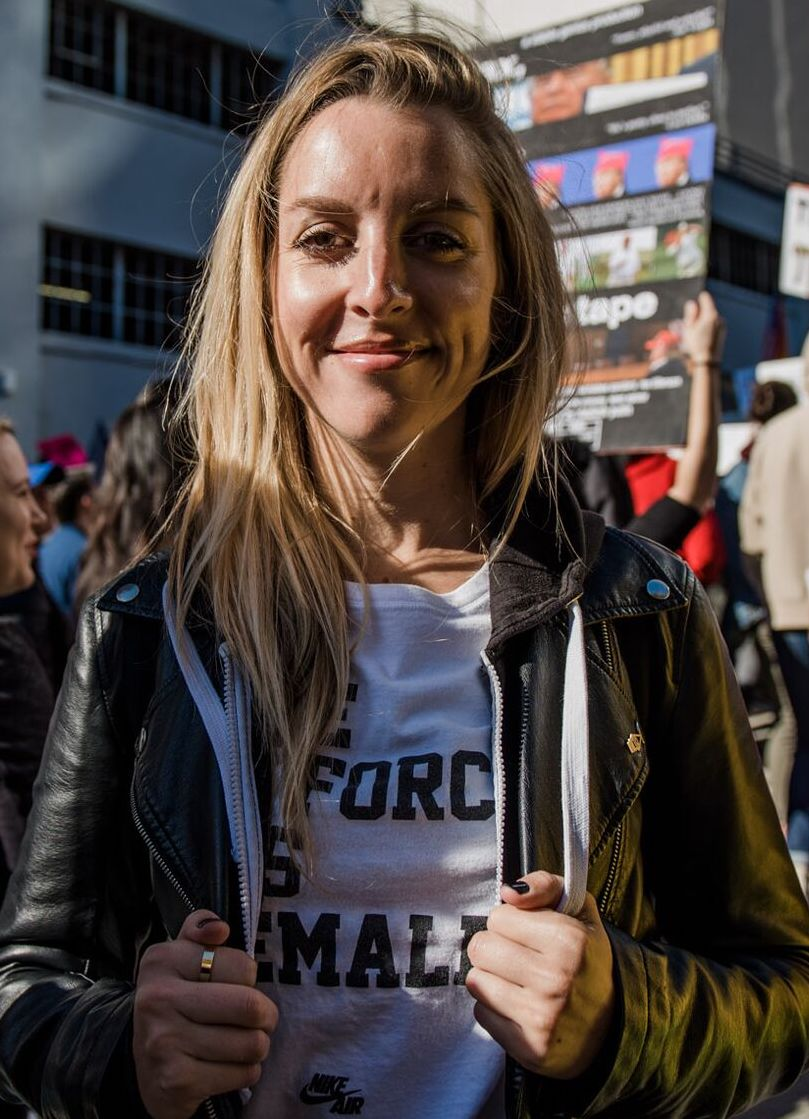
- Wakefield in Los Angeles in 2018
- Born: Moe, Victoria, Australia
- Occupations: Writer, actress
- Years active: 2008–present

Shanrah Wakefield is an Australia born writer and actress. Her writing credits include the Lifetime movie Wrong Swipe (2016), which she co-wrote with Sophie Tilson. In acting, she was one of the stars of the 2009 web series, OzGirl, and joined the Australian sketch comedy series, Kinne in 2015.

== Early life ==
Wakefield was born in Moe, a town in the Gippsland region of Victoria, Australia, where her parents, David and Toni Wakefield, owned Safetech Pty Ltd, a manufacturer of materials handling equipment.

She is a graduate of Monash University in Melbourne, where she earned degrees in Liberal Arts and Law. She also studied, for a time, at the Lee Strasburg Theater Institute in Los Angeles.

== Career ==
In 2009, Wakefield starred in the Australia-based web series, OzGirl. The series won several awards including best actor at the 4th Annual ITVfest, which Wakefield shared with her co-star Sophie Tilson as well as the Streamy Award for best foreign web series.

In 2011, she co-starred in ElfQuest: A Fan Imagining a web trailer endorsed by the creators of the comic book series, ElfQuest.

In 2015, she joined the cast of the Australian sketch comedy show, Kinne, for its second season.

In 2015, her screenplay for the movie, Wrong Swipe, which she wrote with her former OzGirl co-star, Sophie Tilson, was produced for Lifetime TV and aired on 13 February 2016. She has had a number of subsequent TV movie writing credits.

== Filmography ==
Year	Title	Role	Notes
2009	OzGirl	Megan Brown	Web series
2009	The Guild	Waitress	Web series
2011	Elevator	Various characters	Web series
2011	ElfQuest: A Fan Imagining	Clearbrook	Digital short
2015	Kinne	various characters	Australian sketch comedy show

== Awards and recognitions ==
- ITVfest
  - 2009 Best actor for OzGirl
  - 2009 Best web series for OzGirl
- Streamy Awards Best foreign web series for OzGirl
- Additional Recognitions
  - 2009 WebSeriesToday Web star to watch award
