= Hopes and Dreams =

Hopes and Dreams may refer to:

- Hopes & Dreams, a 2008 debut album by Faster Faster
- Hopes & Dreams: The Lullaby Project, a 2018 compilation album by various artists
- "Hopes and Dreams", a song from the soundtrack of the 2015 video game Undertale by Toby Fox

== See also ==
- "Land of Hope and Dreams", 1999 song by Bruce Springsteen
