= Michelle Tesoro =

American film editor

Michelle Tesoro is an American film editor. She is best known for her work on the television miniseries The Queen's Gambit (2020), which earned her an ACE Eddie Award and a Primetime Emmy Award.

== Life ==
Michelle Tesoro grew up in Chicago. She attended Whitney M. Young High School, studied at the University of Illinois at Urbana-Champaign and graduated at the Tisch School of the Arts.

She started her career as DVD and promo editor at ABKCO Music & Records in New York City. In 2005 she moved to Los Angeles. Soon she became assistant editor for film and TV productions. Since 2007 she started to edit TV productions like The Mimi & Flo Show, Swingtown and In Treatment.

Her work for the dramedy Natural Selection was awarded the prize for best editing at the South by Southwest 2011.

== Selected filmography ==
- 2007: The Mimi & Flo Show (TV series, 3 episodes)
- 2008: Swingtown (TV series, 2 episodes)
- 2009: Women in Trouble (Cinema)
- 2009–2010: In Treatment (TV series, 17 episodes)
- 2010: Fringe (TV series, 3 episodes)
- 2011: Natural Selection (Cinema)
- 2012: Luck (TV series, 4 episodes)
- 2013: House of Cards (TV series, 5 episodes)
- 2013: The Newsroom (TV series, 2 episodes)
- 2014: Revenge of the Green Dragons (Cinema)
- 2014: Hoke (TV movie)
- 2015: Flesh and Bone (Miniseries, 3 episodes)
- 2017: When We Rise (Miniseries, 1 episode)
- 2017: Shot Caller (Cinema)
- 2017: Godless (Miniseries, 7 episodes)
- 2018: On the Basis of Sex (Cinema)
- 2019: When They See Us (Miniseries, 1 episode)
- 2019: Ballers (TV series, 1 episode)
- 2020: The Queen's Gambit (Miniseries, 7 episodes)
- 2021: Flag Day (Cinema)
- 2023: Maestro (Cinema)

== Awards and nominations ==
Major associations
Year	Award	Category	Nominated work	Result
2021	71st American Cinema Editors Eddie Awards	Best Edited Miniseries or Motion Picture for Television	"Exchanges"; The Queen's Gambit	Won
2021	73rd Primetime Creative Arts Emmy Awards	Outstanding Single-Camera Picture Editing for a Limited or Anthology Series or Movie	"Exchanges"; The Queen's Gambit	Won
