= Affif =

Affif is both a surname and a given name. Notable people with the name include:

- Ron Affif (born 1965), American jazz guitarist
- Affif Ben Badra (born 1960), French actor and stuntman
