= Laurent Touil-Tartour =

American film director

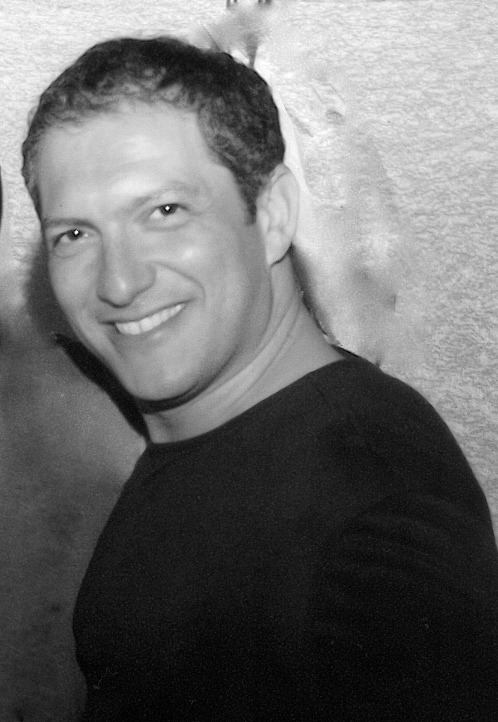
- Touil-Tartour in 1999
- Born: November 23, 1971 (age 54); Paris, France
- Other name: LTT
- Occupations: Film director, producer, screenwriter
- Years active: 1991–present

Laurent Touil-Tartour (born November 23, 1971) is a French film director, screenwriter, and producer. He is known for writing, directing and producing the web series Urban Wolf (2010). His works have been described by the American Film Institute, Wired Magazine, The Wall Street Journal and others as "original and visionary". In 2010 Touil-Tartour licensed the worldwide distribution rights of Urban Wolf to Sony Pictures Entertainment. In 2011 Touil-Tartour has signed with film director/producer Michael Bay's production company The Institute to direct feature films, commercials, video games, web content and/or TV shows.

== Filmography ==
=== Web & Mobile ===
- Urban Wolf (2010) – creator, producer, writer, director

Urban Wolf is an online non-verbal drama series, with 15 webisodes of 4 minutes long each. The world premiere and first public screening of the show took place at the 2009 San Diego Comic-Con

In 2009, at the 4th Annual Los Angeles Independent Television Festival Urban Wolf won the Award for Best Drama. And in 2011, during the 15th Annual Webby Awards Urban Wolf won the People's Voice Award for Best Drama. It also has been selected for the 2009 AFI DigiFest by the American Film Institute as "one of the most compelling example of new media storytelling".

On March 31, 2010, Sony Pictures Entertainment officially announces a groundbreaking worldwide distribution deal for the series. The show premiered on Sony Pictures Entertainment owned Crackle on May 13, 2010. Then Sony Pictures syndicated the series in a multi-platform footprint including: YouTube, hulu, the PlayStation Network, Google TV, the Bravia Network, Animax, AXN, AT&T, Sprint.

=== Feature films ===
- San-Antonio (2004) – writer, co-producer, uncredited director

== Awards and nominations ==
=== Awards ===
- 2011 Webby Award – Best Drama Award Winner of the 15th Annual Webby People's Voice Awards.
- 2009 Independent Television Festival – Best Drama Award Winner.
- 2009 Dragon*Con Independent Film Festival – Staff Picks Award Winner.

=== Nominations ===
- 2009 American Film Institute DigiFest – Nominated as "Most Innovative Digital Media Production".
- 2009 San Diego Comic-Con Official Selection.
- 2010 Massachusetts Institute of Technology – MIT Media Lab – Center for Future Storytelling – Official Selection.
- 2011 Webby Award – Nominated for "Best Drama" for both Webby Award and People's Voice Award.

== Reception ==
Laurent Touil-Tartour has received overwhelmingly enthusiastic critical reception upon the release of Urban Wolf. Journalist and critic Hugh Hart, writing for Wired Magazine noted: "Laurent Touil-Tartour exploits sharp edits, a driving score and spare cinematography to extract maximum tension and an handsomely filmed suspense drama.” Hugh Hart also enjoyed the usage of non-verbal storytelling: "Not a word gets spoken in Urban Wolf. But even without dialogue, French filmmaker Laurent Touil-Tartour has made an unusually sophisticated spy-tech thriller.”

Critic Jandy Stone Hardesty, in her review for Row Three, said that Touil-Tartour has “a nice flair for composition and a good sense of visual storytelling, he also knows how to do good twists and suggest things rather than spell them out, something I really appreciated.” William Bibbiani, in CraveOnline, called it "an exciting little bit of filmmaking that deserves its notoriety and is worth howling about", and Liz Shannon Miller writing in GigaOM wrote that "“Urban Wolf is a gripping thriller that stands out as proudly unique. Some of Wolf's execution might emulate classic 1970s thrillers, but the concept is pure 21st century, playing nimbly with issues of privacy and paranoia. When a director can make even the eating of a potato chip seem malevolent (as occurs in the yet-to-premiere episode 7), you know you've watching something special."

Reviewing it for the Mingle Media TV Network, journalist Kristyn Burtt wrote: "The reason this series stands out amongst the pack is its cinematic feel and the utilization of mise en scene. You don't hear the main character utter a word until Episode 7, and boy, is it effective.”

Awarding the film a five out of five star rating, Feo Amante's film critic E.C.McMullen Jr. wrote: "The tension from episode to episode is incredible and Laurent just keeps ramping it up. With its beautiful settings (shot in Paris, France), excellent cinematography, and super tight, witty action, this could very well define the future of online cinema. I'm not kidding! URBAN WOLF is a Turbo Thrust Cat and Mouse Thriller with a V8 engine!”

== Appearances in media ==
- Eguiders – Touil-Tartour interview by Marc Ostrick. May 5, 2010
- The Web Files – Touil-Tartour interview with Kristyn Burtt. May 12, 2010
- Paris Premiere – First TV appearance of the young French movie director Touil-Tartour in the hit TV series documentary Paris Derniere Season 8, Episode 21: Original Air Date—April 26, 2002
