= Mission Backup Earth =

- Genre: Sci-fi
- Created by: Alexander Pfander
- Directed by: Alexander Pfander
- Music by: Hans Hafner, Mike Rooke (Ep3), Kiriako Nedelkos (Ep5)
- Original language: English
- No. of seasons: 1
- No. of episodes: 5

Production
- Running time: 5-15 minutes

Mission Backup Earth is a science fiction web series written and directed by Alexander Pfander. This award-winning series began airing in 2014, in a series of 5- to 15-minute YouTube episodes.

Mission Backup Earth uses modern scientific methods and concepts, and therefore integrates them into a story, intending to give a realistic view of space travel and colonization, while questioning and exploring the evolution of mankind, cosmic disasters, and philosophical questions about humanity's existence.

Actor David Prowse, who played Darth Vader in the Star Wars films, has made a cameo in the show.

Actress Monika Gossmann, who was Designer #1 of the movie Iron Sky is a regular actress in the show as Dr Weir.

Actor Anthony Straeger is known for his role in the movie Land of Mine for the role of Officer Garth.

== Awards ==
- 2014 LAWebfest: Outstanding Directing, Visual Effects, Editing & Cinematography in a Sci-Fi series.

== Media ==
Mission Backup Earth has been the subject of several articles published by online and print media organisations, mainly with a Science fiction focus, including Science Fiction and Fantasy Association of New Zealand, SF Crowsnest, Starburst (magazine) and Contactmusic.com

== See also ==
- List of Web television series
