= Malice: The Webseries =

Horror Webseries

- Genre: Horror, Adventure, Sci-fi
- Created by: Philip Cook
- Starring: Brittany Martz; Rebekkah Johnson; Mark Hyde; Leanna Chamish; Matt Gulbranson; Nora Palka
- Country of origin: United States
- No. of seasons: 4
- No. of episodes: 24

Production
- Producer: Philip Cook
- Production location: Falls Church, Virginia
- Running time: 5-10 minutes per episode (web series)

Original release
- Network: Koldcast TV, YouTube, Hulu
- Release: Web series: September 22, 2011

Malice: The Webseries is a horror sci-fi web series created by Eagle Films. The series chronicles the Turner family after they move into their late grandmother's home. When paranormal events begin to occur, it is up to the family's youngest member, teenage Alice, to save the day. The series' protagonist shares the name of and is inspired by Alice, from Lewis Carroll's novel Alice in Wonderland. Malice: The Webseries was compiled into a feature film which debuted on Hulu September 24, 2014.

Malice: Metamorphosis consists of seasons three and four of the webseries. Metamorphosis occurs one year after the events of the second season. As Alice tries to piece her life back together, she is troubled by dreams of an epic medieval battle and the armored specter of her dead father. Totaling twelve additional episodes, the finale of Metamorphosis was released March 22, 2015.

== History ==
Malice: The Webseries began filming in the summer of 2011. The second season was completed February 2013 . During the summer of 2012, Malice raised $10,170 out of a goal of $8,000 on Kickstarter to finance Season 2.

Malice: Metamorphosis was funded by another successful Kickstarter, which raised $12,195.

=== Awards ===
- April 2, 2014: Malice won "Best Visual Effects" at the Indie Series Awards
- September 30, 2014: Malice won "Best Editing at ITVFest (Independent Television Festival)
- Malice was listed in Webvee Guide's most memorable shows of 2014
- Malice was listed 8th on IMDb's Halloween Horrorfest 2014
- March 29, 2015: Malice won "Best Visual Effects" at the Hollyweb Festival
- Malice was nominated for several awards at the LA Web Fest 2015:
  - MALICE—Outstanding Series
  - Philip Cook—Outstanding Director
  - Brittany Martz—Outstanding Lead Actress
  - MALICE—Outstanding Visual Effects
  - Philip Cook—Outstanding Editing
  - Philip Cook—Outstanding Sound Design
