= San-Antonio (film) =

2004 French comedy film

- Theatrical release poster
- Directed by: Frédéric Auburtin
- Written by: Laurent Touil-Tartour
- Based on: The San-Antonio book series (1949-2001) by Frédéric Dard
- Produced by: Claude Berri; Nathalie Rheims; Pierre Grunstein
- Starring: Gérard Lanvin; Gérard Depardieu
- Music by: Jean-Yves D'Angelo
- Production companies: Pathé Films; Renn Productions; TF1 Films Production
- Distributed by: Pathé Films
- Release date: July 21, 2004 (France)
- Running time: 95 minutes
- Country: France
- Language: French
- Budget: €23,36 million

San-Antonio is a 2004 French action comedy film, directed by Frédéric Auburtin and starring Gérard Lanvin as the titular protagonist, police commissioner San-Antonio, and Gérard Depardieu as his sidekick, lieutenant Bérurier.

Based on Frédéric Dard's popular book series and produced by Claude Berri, the film had a high budget by French standards. It had a troubled production history, received mostly negative reviews and bombed at the box-office.

== Plot ==
As the World is facing a mysterious terrorist menace, dashing police commissioner San-Antonio and his deputy, overweight and bumbling lieutenant Bérurier, must ensure the protection of the French ambassador to the United Kingdom during a stay at a luxury hotel. But due to Bérurier's negligence, the ambassador is kidnapped by a female member of the terrorist organization.

San-Antonio takes the blame for this failure and is dismissed from the police forces. But when the President of France is also kidnapped, the Minister of the Interior decides to recall San-Antonio, who is put in charge of a secret brigade and given two days to save France from disaster. Bérurier, who has been unduly promoted, finds himself in competition with San-Antonio to accomplish this mission. San-Antonio and Bérurier must overcome their rivalry and rekindle their partnership in order to foil the terrorists's plot and rescue the President.

== Cast ==
- Gérard Lanvin as Commissioner Antoine San-Antonio
- Gérard Depardieu as Lieutenant Alexandre-Benoît Bérurier
- Michèle Bernier as Berthe Bérurier
- Marie-Thérèse Arène as Félicie, San-Antonio's mother
- Michel Galabru as Achille, head of the French police
- Robert Hossein as the Minister of the Interior
- Luis Rego as Inspector Pinaud
- Jean-Roger Milo as Inspector Mathias
- Delphine Zentout as Mathias' assistant
- Jérémie Renier as Toinet
- Eriq Ebouaney as Jérémie Blanc
- Valeria Golino as the Italian terrorist
- Patrick Médioni as "Van Gogh", a terrorist
- Élisabeth Margoni as the first Lady
- Barbara Schulz as Marianne, the president's daughter
- Guilhem Pellegrin as the president's secretary
- Hubert Saint-Macary as Mr Chapon
- Cyrielle Clair as Mrs Chapon
- André Thorent as Célestin-Marie Chapon
- Vanessa Guedj as maid
- Lucy Harrison as masseuse
- Jacques Spiesser as Dr Hubert
- Maryam d'Abo as Margaux
- Henri Garcin as Swiss banker
- Wilfred Benaïche as security chief
- Marc Faure as ambassador
- Michel Pilorgé as guard
- Affif Ben Badra as Brazilian
- Patachou as Ruth Booz
- Élodie Hesme as reporter
- Jean Dell as reporter
- Jean-François Deniau as the President of France

== Production ==
Frédéric Dard's San-Antonio book series, which began publication in 1949, was a major best-seller in France for several decades. It was considered an integral part of French popular culture, noted for its raucously humorous tone and its inventive use of the French language, particularly slang. Following several film adaptations in the 1960s and 1980s, Dard was long reluctant to authorize a new screen version of his work. Shortly before Dard's death in 2000, young filmmaker Laurent Touil-Tartour, a lifelong fan of the series, managed to convince the author to sell him the adaptation rights for the books, thwarting businessman-turned-actor Bernard Tapie who had hoped to produce a television series starring himself as San-Antonio.

Claude Berri agreed to produce Touil-Tartour's script, granting him a €23 million budget, the highest ever allocated in France to a film by a first-time director. Antoine de Caunes was initially set to portray the titular protagonist, but the role was eventually given to Gérard Depardieu while Jean-Pierre Castaldi was cast as his sidekick Bérurier. However, Depardieu, who was supposed to lose weight for the film, proved unable to do so. Shortly before filming began, the role of San-Antonio had to be recast and was given to Gérard Lanvin, while Depardieu switched roles and replaced Castaldi as Bérurier. Following this last-minute recast, Depardieu proved uncomfortable in his new role throughout production.

Filming began on June 23, 2003. After ten days, Berri was unhappy with the dailies and demanded script rewrites. Filming was suspended for two weeks: Berri fired the cinematographer and the cameraman, and appointed Frédéric Auburtin as an "artistic advisor" to Touil-Tartour. Filming then resumed but Touil-Tartour, who felt dispossessed of his film, clashed with Auburtin. On August 5, Berri fired Touil-Tartour and officially appointed Auburtin as director: he also revised the budget downwards and demanded that all of the scenes directed by Touil-Tartour be reshot. Several supporting roles also had to be recast after the actors left production.

== Reception ==
Upon release, San-Antonio was poorly received by critics. A review in Variety called it a "tongue-in-cheek clunker that's strangely entertaining because it's so jaw-droppingly bad". It flopped at the French box-office, selling 257 549 admissions. Lanvin later publicly disparaged the film.

The film's failure significantly impacted the assets of Claude Berri. His partner Nathalie Rheims, who had co-produced the film, had to personally lend him two million euros. Berri was only bailed out by the success of Welcome to the Sticks four years later. In a 2005 interview, he mentioned San-Antonio as the main regret in his career.

== Home video ==
The film was released on DVD in 2005, and on VOD on Filmotv and Orange.
