= Orange Juice in Bishop's Garden =

- Genre: web series, drama, dramedy, young adult, teen
- Created by: Otessa Ghadar
- Starring: Ellen Winter; George Ross; Rachel Peterson; Nick Libowitz; Storm Garner; DeAndre Baker; Donnis Collins; Kristin Roger; Sarah Hirsch; Albert Tholen; Aleca Piper; Andrew Cohen; Hannah Goldman; LeAsha Julius; Laura Long
- Theme music composer: Juicy Demise (Ellen Reid, Sara Curtin)
- Opening theme: "Midnight Joyride (Concentrated)"
- Country of origin: United States
- Original language: English
- No. of seasons: 7
- No. of episodes: 98

Production
- Camera setup: Single-camera
- Running time: 2–10 minutes
- Production company: 20/20 Productions

Orange Juice in Bishop's Garden is one of the first web series, created and directed by the web pioneer Otessa Ghadar. The show is a web series about the decade immediately preceding and leading up to the advent of the internet. Orange Juice in Bishops Garden the series details the lives of a group of teenagers as they navigate high school in the 1990s. Orange Juice in Bishop's Garden, also affectionately known as OJinBG, has seven seasons, each being a trifecta of content: a feature length movie, an entire web series season, and a young adult book. OJinBG is one of the oldest and longest running web series, having started in 2006. The show is set and shot in the greater metropolitan Washington D.C. area.

Orange Juice in Bishops Garden the series is currently available on its own website, Amazon Prime Video, YouTube, Roku, and others.

Among the many awards won by OJinBG and Otessa Ghadar, most notable are the 3 time Webby Award Official Nominees and the 6 Telly Award wins.

Originally, OJinBG was primarily distributed by KoldCast TV, a now defunct Broadband Television Network that delivers on-demand entertainment programming to a global audience, via the Internet. This partnership enables Orange Juice in Bishop's Garden to be viewed on iTunes, Zune, Boxee, and Roku.

New episodes premiered weekly, every Wednesday during the season, accompanied by interactive social networking on the official website, blog, Twitter, and Facebook pages. The show is available in closed captioning for hearing-impaired viewers, in addition to being available with French, Spanish, and German subtitles. The show is also currently being translated into Spanish and Russian, as part of a larger translation push.

== History ==
Orange Juice in Bishop's Garden started in 2006 as Otessa Ghadar's MFA Thesis for Graduate Film studies, at Columbia University's Film school in NYC, and grew from there. As the series grew into a global phenomenon, Otessa created the show with the assistance of her mother and Production Designer, Lis de Tuerk Ghadar. Otessa is also the founder of 20/20 Productions, which produced the films and series.

Episodes are inspired by memories of Ghadar's own teenage years in Washington, D.C. Ghadar continued Orange Juice in Bishop's Garden in 2009 to focus on the culture, the fashion and the indie lore of the nation's capital. The production team is female driven, and the cast and crew is composed entirely of local area residents.

== Reception ==
Orange Juice in Bishop's Garden is currently viewed in over 150 countries (Top five: USA, France, UK, Canada, Brazil), and was consistently one of the most popular series on KoldCast TV. OJinBG went viral multiple times over, with more than 8 million views. The series is a 3 time Webby Award Official Honoree and 6 time Telly Award winner. OJinBG and Otessa Ghadar have also won numerous other awards across the global festival circuit, from LA to Miami to beyond.

In Season 2, a new relationship began between lead characters Sarah (Ellen Winter) and Gwen (Katie Foster). The couple has since developed a cult following, with many LBGT media sites —including AfterEllen.com, SheWired, CherryGrrl, and OneMoreLesbian.com—praising the true to life portrayal of the story. In 2010, the cast and crew of Orange Juice in Bishop's Garden were invited to participate in the 2nd Annual Battle of the Lesbian Web Series at the Dinah 2011. The event was hosted by OneMoreLesbian.com and was attended by several popular lesbian web series.

In 2011, Otessa Ghadar was named July Filmmaker of the Month by the District of Columbia Office of Motion Picture and Television Development for her creation and direction of the show.

== Music ==
Orange Juice in Bishop's Garden features songs from a variety of composers and indie artists. The soundtrack is heavily influenced by indie rock, reggae, ska, and ambient music.

The original theme song was created by Juicy Demise, a duo consisting of musicians Ellen Reid and Sara Curtin. Together, they created the song, "Midinight Joyride (Concentrated)" which was used in Season 1. Season 2 saw the introduction of a new theme song, titled "Orange Juice in Bishop’s Garden (Season 2 Theme Song)", composed by Brent Katz of the Harlem Shakes. A sing-a-long version featuring various members of the cast was used in Season 3. Season 4 brought the return of "Midinight Joyride (Concentrated)". A truncated version was recorded live during the taping of an episode, featuring vocals by most of the cast and several extras.

Another song by Brent Katz, "Polo", was featured in the Season 1 episode "Will You Be There Tonight?". His band, the Harlem Shakes, contributed the song "Josh Studies", which was heard in the episode "Midnight, Hunter’s Moon, Pt.3".

Lead cast member Ellen Winter is also an up-and-coming singer-songwriter. Her original songs "Bank Statement" and "Comfortable" were featured in several Season 2 episodes.

Live performances by Ellen and Washington, D.C. based band Bake Sale (formerly Las Hermanas), were highlighted in Season 4 episode "Sarah Live! @ Comet Ping Pong Tonight". Bake Sale can also be seen in later episode "In the Army Now". Many of Bake Sale's songs were used throughout Seasons 3 and 4. Otessa Ghadar directed a video for their song "Hide & Go Seek", which will be released as the Season 4 finale.

== See also ==
- List of Web television series
