= Kinne (Australian TV series) =

Australian sketch comedy television series

- Genre: Crude/Comedy
- Written by: Troy Kinne
- Directed by: Troy Kinne; Max Price; Jason A Tutty
- Presented by: Troy Kinne
- Opening theme: Killin' Floor by Blues Saraceno
- Country of origin: Australia
- Original language: English
- No. of seasons: 2
- No. of episodes: 12

Production
- Executive producer: MaryAnne Carroll
- Producers: Troy Kinne; Max Price; Kate Thomson
- Production location: Global Television Studios
- Editors: Troy Kinne; Max Price; Darius Family
- Running time: 30 minutes (inc. adverts)
- Production company: Seven Productions

Original release
- Network: 7mate
- Release: 8 July 2014 – 21 May 2015

Kinne is an Australian sketch comedy television series which first aired on 7mate on 8 July 2014. Season 2 began airing on 23 April 2015.

A DVD of the complete series 1 and 2 was released 1 September 2015 exclusively to home entertainment retailer JB Hi-Fi.

== Cast ==
- Troy Kinne
- Shanrah Wakefield
- Elliot Loney
- Nick Cody
- Des Dowling
- CJ Fortuna
- Nicolette Minster
- Nikki Osborne
- Tom Siegert
- Emma-Louise Wilson
- Max Price
- Celia Pacquola
- Josh Lawson
- Ronny Chieng
- Andy Lee

== Episodes ==
=== Series overview ===
Series	Episodes	Originally released	
Series	Episodes	First released	Last released
1	6	8 July 2014	12 August 2014
2	6	23 April 2015	21 May 2015

=== Season 1 (2014) ===
No. overall	No. in season	Title	Original release date	Australian viewers
1	1	"Episode 1"	8 July 2014	266,000
2	2	"Episode 2"	15 July 2014	243,000
3	3	"Episode 3"	22 July 2014	133,000
4	4	"Episode 4"	29 July 2014	151,000
5	5	"Episode 5"	5 August 2014	106,000
6	6	"Episode 6"	12 August 2014	124,000

=== Season 2 (2015) ===
No. overall	No. in season	Title	Original release date	Australian viewers
7	1	"Episode 1"	23 April 2015	109,000
8	2	"Episode 2"	30 April 2015	101,000
9	3	"Episode 3"	7 May 2015	92,000
10	4	"Episode 4"	14 May 2015	122,000
11	5	"Episode 5"	21 May 2015	116,000
12	6	"Episode 6"	21 May 2015	116,000

== See also ==
- Kinne Tonight
