= Fu@K I Love U =

'F#@K I Love U'
- Genre: Drama, Comedy
- Created by: Lucky Mor
- Written by: Lucky Mor
- Starring: Lucky Mor; Murisa Harba; Gabriel Voss; Ashlee Buchanan; Zehra Fazal; Marilinda Rivera; Thai Edwards; Clare Snodgrass; Ozzie Rodriguez; Maceo Fisher; Tiffany Tynes; Kevyn Richmond
- Country of origin: United States
- Original language: English
- No. of seasons: 1
- No. of episodes: 13

Production
- Executive producer: Lucky Mor
- Production locations: Los Angeles; Hollywood; Inglewood
- Cinematography: Stephen Ling; Pedja Radenkovic
- Editors: Cornelius Moore; Max Fausnight
- Running time: 8 to 20 minutes

Original release
- Network: YouTube; Vimeo
- Release: 18 March 2014 – present

F#@K I Love U is a United States original independent drama/comedy series. The pilot episode premiered March 18, 2014 followed by 4 additional episodes August 10, 2014 on YouTube and Vimeo. February 4, 2015 the official website was launched with additional video content and photos. F#@K I Love U has won the 2015 award for ITVFest (Independent Television Festival) "Best Acting Ensemble" in Dover, Vermont and the Indie Fest 2015 July "Award of Merit."

== Story ==
F#@K I Love U is a dramatic tale of a modern family that gets quickly pulled into a spiral of interconnected events that test the limits of their bond and mutual love. Douglas Winston, a black conservative councilman for Los Angeles, California, has built his supposedly dream life and family with his college sweetheart Angie, a white liberal philanthropist. Together they had twin boys, James and Michael. Douglas and Angie have very different views on life, but it was those different views and passions that made them attracted to each other. Also they had that desire to have the perfect family. As both of their careers took off, leading in different directions, it became hard to be one another's support system. Angie being a working mom of two, trying to hold the family together while keeping her own identity does a television interview to promote her passionate work. In that interview she states that some of Douglas’ policies on banning teen birth control options would be, "detrimental to the community." This ignites an anger and hurt in Douglas feeling he's lost the one person he thought would never devalue him, and in such a public format. With him feeling betrayed, Douglas stops speaking to Angie and enters into the arms of his very eager yet extremely unstable assistant Clare. When finally Douglas and Angie come to an understanding, he firmly and brutally ends the affair with Clare. This leaves her totally unhinged for retaliation and revenge.

Douglas' birth parents died in a fire when he was one years old. He was then adopted by his Godparents, a white upper middle class couple, Michael Sr. and Cynthia. They had a son of their own just months younger, James “J” Winston. J now is an early 30s out of work actor that rebels against authority treating life recklessly. He's a good-looking charming womanizer that uses various vices, drugs, sex, and alcohol, to medicate his demons. As children J and Douglas were very close, best friends and confidantes. As they got older and lives took different directions the bond became strained.

With J not speaking to Douglas following a fight and the death of their grandmother, Douglas with family in tow goes to J's house. Douglas asks Angie if she has seen his brother, she says no. However Douglas knows Angie and J have been seeing each other because Douglas has been having J followed by a private investigator who took photos of the two. This leads him to believe there may be an affair happening between his brother and wife. Once at J's house the brothers fight leaving more hurt feelings and misunderstandings. Douglas and Angie are also introduced to Tiffany, J's friend with benefits. Beautiful, sexy, carefree and adorably politically incorrect Tiffany finds and forces her way into the Winston family's lives and hearts. Once outside the family's lives are jeopardized by a drive-by shooting assuming aimed after J. Douglas demands answers from J about any crazy behavior or actions that would be the cause of this.

Following the drive-by Angie calls her college friend for medical assistance, Amanda Jain, a beautiful Lesbian Muslim Pakistani MD who is falling for an equally beautiful but dark, tortured, and mysterious Dominican woman, party DJ Elle. Amanda wants to get to know Elle, have a more meaningful relationship. Elle, not wanting to have an emotional connection but is very much drawn to Amanda, finds herself being more open than she'd prefer. This relationship scale tips in ether direction to the fortune or misfortune of the other.

J believing he knows who's after him comes to Douglas. J tells a story on having a sexual encounter with his drug dealer's girlfriend. The brothers for to question, Junebug, 30s, black, muscular, and intimidating, at his home in Inglewood. Once their Junebug informs them that he had no involvement but since J is his “best client” he'll find out who did. While on that J finds out that Junebug is a single father of a college freshmen, Reggie. Reggie doesn't know his father has been dealing drugs, guns, and prostitution to fund his college education. But Junebug doesn't know his son is a homosexual. Once both secrets are revealed, the struggle to understand and forgive is a more than difficult road.

== Main cast ==
- Lucky Mor - Douglas Winston
- Murisa Harba - Angie Winston
- Gabriel Voss - J Winston
- Ashlee Buchanan - Tiffany Montgomery
- Zehra Fazal - Amanda Jain, MD
- Marilinda Rivera - Elle
- Thai Edwards - Junebug
- Clare Snodgrass - Clare Botwin
- Ozzie Rodriguez - Russell Zuniga
- Maceo Fisher - Dee
- Tiffany Tynes - Maiya Youn
- Kevyn Richmond - Reggie

== Recognition and awards ==
- 2015 ITVFest (Independent Television Festival) – WINNER - Best Acting Ensemble.
- 2015 Urban Mediamakers Film Festival - Official Selection in Web Series Competition.
- 2015 Digitalimation Awards - Official Selection 2015 October Best Web Series

== See also ==
- ITVFest (Independent Television Festival)
- Web television
- International Academy of Web Television
- List of Web television series
