= Faster Faster =

- Origin: Brunswick, Georgia
- Genres: Pop punk, alternative rock
- Years active: 2007–2009, 2015, 2020–present
- Label: Oort Records
- Members: Kyle Davis; Randall Dowling; Aaron Thornton
- Past members: Joey Poppell; Steuart Wainright; Trevor Aspinwall; Christian Mosely; Tyler Monroe; Ryan

Faster Faster is a band from Brunswick, Georgia, United States.

== History ==
=== Formation ===
Forming in 2006, it wasn't until a year and one EP release later that Faster Faster's classic line-up was solidified in July 2007 by five musicians. Kyle Davis (vocals), Randall Dowling (vocals/guitar), Christian Mosely (guitar), Steuart Wainright (drums), and Joey Poppell (bass) were all previously members of other local, predominantly hardcore, bands in and around Brunswick, Georgia, but found a Pop-Punk sound they felt was more fitting after leaving their grungy tunes behind. The band's popularity in the area skyrocketed after hundreds of listeners logged on to their Myspace profiles to listen to their music.

=== Pillow Talk 101 and Hopes & Dreams ===
Producing a glimpse of their potential hit songs, Pillow Talk 101 was released on the south Georgia record label Still Movement Records after several months of brainstorming and recording. Shortly thereafter, they paired up with Matt Vigliotti and Eccentric Energy Entertainment to manage the band and help with touring.

After two years of playing live shows and critiquing their work, Faster Faster, with bigger dreams of success than ever, released their freshman, full-length album Hopes and Dreams in August 2008 on Oort Records, a sub-label of Lobster Records.

After the release of their debut full-length CD, Faster Faster launched a nationwide tour, traveling outside the east coast to cities including New York City, New York; Tallahassee, Florida; and Chicago, Illinois. The band has toured with other up-and-coming bands from along the east coast (such as Backseat Goodbye, The Ready Set, 1997, We Are! The New Year, and Stages & Stereos and opened for bands of notoriety in their genre such as Mayday Parade, School Boy Humor, and Farewell. They were also featured on AMP Magazine's 21 Young Guns of 2009 compilation CD.

=== Unfinished second studio album ===
In late 2008, Faster Faster returned to Earthsound Studios in Valdosta Georgia to begin recording their second studio album. Three demos, titled "170 as Usual" "The Weekend" and "Word of Advice You're A Joke", were released via the website Absolute Punk and the band's Myspace and purevolume pages. At least three other new songs were played by the band at live shows between the recording process and their break-up, including one named after a scene from the movie Step Brothers, "The Catalina Wine Mixer".

=== Break-up ===
On September 22, 2009, Faster Faster released a statement via Myspace that they were officially through with the band.

Soon after the end of Faster Faster, Randall Dowling took control of the band's Myspace page in order to launch his then-solo project I Am Me, releasing 4 songs titled "The City", "Two Years", "Dog", and "The Way She Sees Me". Soon after the release of this project, Dowling put up a blog stating that Faster Faster's old drummer, Steuart Wainright, had been added to the lineup of I Am Me. A photoshoot was done for the duo and some of the pictures were uploaded to Wainright's Facebook profile. Since then, the blog and pictures have been deleted.

In April 2010, at a show in Brunswick, Georgia, after Dowling played a set as I Am Me, Kyle Davis made a guest appearance to finish the set with a cover of MGMT's "Electric Feel". A group consisting of Dowling, Davis, Trevor Aspinwall, Jet Turner, and Miles Teeters (old members of local Brunswick band Dora Maar) then took the stage. Davis stated, "I'm not sure if there's a name for this yet, but we have a couple songs that we're going to play for you". They were later confirmed to be named Never Have I Ever, and recorded four demos at Rock Studio in Brunswick.

=== Solid Gold Thunder ===
On March 10, 2011, Dowling announced a new project called Solid Gold Thunder via Facebook. The band included previous Faster Faster members Kyle, Randall, Steuart, and Aaron with newcomer Jet Turner who had previously supplied additional vocals on Faster faster's "... And Always". They released their only EP, "The Hot Weather Sessions" in July 2012 featuring the tracks "Black Velveteen", "Give My Regards To Smokey", "Sergeant Jacuzzi", "Let It Ride", "I Like You, But You're Crazy", and the previously unreleased Faster Faster song "Catalina Wine Mixer" which also received a music video After the initial EP, the band released a few more songs including "No Need to Brag", "Dropping F Bombs", and "Keep It Down".

In March 2013, the band released their last song with Kyle providing vocals entitled "Please Be 18" through Vinyl Mag. While he was still present with the band through the summer, by October, Kyle's departure was made official as the band debuted a video titled "Solid Gold Thunder - The Intangible Things (BRAND NEW SONG/BRAND NEW LINEUP)". While the band publicized an album with the new line-up titled "Vices and Addictions" to be released in Fall of 2014 they only ever released two singles with the new line up: "Wolves on a Beach" and "I Don't Know Where to Start".

=== Reunion ===
In April 2015, the band announced what was at the time going to be a one-off reunion show. However, plans changed over time and by October 2020 a full reunion was announced. Since their return, the band has made their 2008 demo and a re-mastered version of "Pillow Talk 101" available on major streaming platforms. They've also been busy in the studio recording new songs including on titled "Nothing Special". The band has also stated they're "hoping to introduce FF fans to the SGT stuff over time", suggesting that the Solid Gold Thunder back-catalog may be taken on as Faster Faster originals.

== Discography ==
| Year | Title | Label | Release type |
|---|---|---|---|
| 2006 | Pillow Talk 101 | | EP |
| 2008 | Hopes & Dreams | Oort Records | Album |
| 2009 | 21 Young Guns Salute | AMP Magazine | Compilation |

=== As Solid Gold Thunder ===
| Year | Title | Label | Release type |
|---|---|---|---|
| 2012 | The Hot Weather Sessions | | EP |
| 2014 | Vices & Addictions | | Unreleased Album |

=== Other releases ===
- "From My TV Screen To Your Bedroom" - "Hopes & Dreams" demo
- "Set The Stage" - Hopes & Dreams b-side
- "These Are The Days (Remix)" - "Hopes & Dreams" b-side
- "You're Killing Me Smalls" - "Hope & Dreams" Japanese bonus track
- "No Need to Brag" - As Solid Gold Thunder,
- "Dropping F Bombs" - As Solid Gold Thunder
- "Keep It Down" - As Solid Gold Thunder.
- "Please Be 18" - As Solid Gold Thunder.
- "You're On Fire" (Instrumental) - As Solid Gold Thunder
- "The Intangible Things" - As Solid Gold Thunder (Presumably for Vices & Addictions).
- "Wolves on a Beach" - As Solid Gold Thunder (Presumably for Vices & Addictions)
- "I Don't Know Where to Start" - As Solid Gold Thunder (Presumably for Vices & Addictions).
- "RIP Chivalry" - As Solid Gold Thunder (Presumably for Vices & Addictions)
- "Bad Bitch Blues" - As Solid Gold Thunder (Presumably for Vices & Addictions)
- "Molly" - As Solid Gold Thunder (Presumably for Vices & Addictions)
