= Hometown Baghdad =

- Created by: Chat The Planet
- Country of origin: Iraq
- No. of episodes: 38

Production
- Producer: Fady Hadid
- Production location: University of Baghdad

Original release
- Release: March 19, 2007

Hometown Baghdad is a documentary web series released in 2007. It tells the stories of three Iraqi college students struggling to survive in Baghdad.

== Background ==
It was produced by New York-based media company Chat The Planet. The series won three Webby Awards for the categories of Public Service and Activism, Best Reality and News, and Politics in 2008, and was nominated for four Webby Awards in 2009.
