= Reality On Demand =

- Created by: Marx Hernandez Pyle
- Starring: Kevin Roach; Aric Dylon Stanish; Kathlin Finn; Julie Hernandez Seaton
- Country of origin: United States
- Original language: English
- No. of seasons: 1
- No. of episodes: 6 (webisodes)

Production
- Executive producer: Marx Hernandez Pyle
- Producers: Jarrod Moschner, Julie Hernandez Seaton, Ian M. Cullen

Original release
- Release: January 18, 2012 – present

Reality on Demand is an American science fiction-comedy web series, created by Marx Hernandez Pyle (Silence of the Belle, Book of Dallas). Pyle is also known as a cinematographer for Star Trek New Voyages and Fight Choreographer for Aidan 5.

Writer/director Marx Hernandez Pyle had first announced the series on his column, The IndieNet and Beyond.

The online series premiered on Blip.tv on January 18, 2012. A second season is rumored to be in development, but no release date has been announced.

Pyle has been quoted as saying he was inspired to come up with web series pilots after interviewing Damian Kindler (Stargate SG-1, Sanctuary (TV series))...

"Reality On Demand was born after that interview. I wrote the outline to a TV pilot and plotted out a season arc. After returning to the United States and filming Silence of the Belle, I dusted off the paperwork and modified the story for a more modest budget. I quickly wrote the new one hour pilot and then broke it into smaller episodes for a web series," explained Pyle.

The series makes nods to many TV shows, including Supernatural, Grey's Anatomy, Buffy the Vampire Slayer, Lost, Walking Dead, etc.

== Series overview ==
Reality On Demand follows four strangers who playtest a highly advanced virtual reality game that puts them into their favorite TV shows and movies. But when they become trapped, a fun adventure takes a dangerous turn where cancellation means death.

== Characters ==
- Kevin Roach as Nick Jacobs, an uber-geek computer programmer, who is obsessed with TV and movies.
- Aric Dylon Stanish as Trevor Clay, a marine veteran who is focused on winning.
- Kathlin Finn as Kelli Hartz, a wannabe celebrity looking for her big break.
- Julie Hernandez Seaton as Courtney Thompson, a struggling writer with a secret.
- Christopher P. Tyner as Aiden Kingston, a host of the virtual reality show that the playtesters are playing.

== Production ==
The series is produced by Alien Jungle Bug Productions.

== Broadcast and release ==
Unlike traditional TV series, the primary distribution channel for Reality on Demand is the Internet. All episodes of season one premiered on Blip, then later on YouTube and other video platforms. Reality on Demand joined Zombie Orpheus Entertainment (ZOE) soon after premiering. ZOE is a distribution company created by Dead Gentlemen Productions.

Reality on Demand won second place for Best Series at Gen Con Film Festival 2012. Season one was selected to screen at 2013 LA Webfest. At LA Webfest the series won an award for Best Visual Effects.
