= The Variants =

- Genre: Comedy
- Created by: Richard Neal; Ken Lowery; Joe Cucinotti
- Directed by: Joe Cucinotti; Jason Chinnock
- Starring: Richard Neal; Barry Fuhrman; Keli Wolfe; Ken Lowery; Joe Cucinotti; Curt Franklin; Chris Haley
- Opening theme: The FarStar; Adam WarRock
- Country of origin: United States
- Original language: English
- No. of seasons: 3
- No. of episodes: 28

Production
- Producers: Richard Neal; Ken Lowery; Joe Cucinotti
- Camera setup: Garrett Dollar; Nathan J Harris; Luke Hawkins
- Running time: 8 to 10 minutes/ep.

Original release
- Network: youtube.com
- Release: August 4, 2009

The Variants is an American comedy web series about four employees who work in comic retail. This scripted comedy has completed 28 episodes comprising three seasons. The Variants aired its first episode August 4, 2009 and wrapped season one in May 2010. Its second season began May 3 of 2011 and completed in February 2012. The Variants completed a successful Kickstarter campaign on May 29, 2012 to fund a season three. A promo teaser was released on August 8, 2012 to Comics Alliance in advance of the new season. Season three launched weekly on September 3, 2012. The show is filmed on location at Zeus Comics in Dallas Texas.

While the series is available free on YouTube, Season One of The Variants was compiled on DVD in June 2011.

== Plot ==
Richard and his employees handle the ins and outs of a struggling comic shop and its particular customers. While working retail in a unique market may offer bizarre situations, the employees have to work out a way to keep the store open through sales gimmicks and comic book artist signings.

== Awards ==
The Variants received a Dallas Observer "Best of" award for its Dallas based production.

== Reviews and Criticisms ==
Early criticism of The Variants include comparisons to Kevin Smith and his film Clerks. However reviewers have called The Variants "a sharply written and produced series" and noted positively the Variants strong LGBT and female characters in a medium dominated by men.

== Guest stars ==
Notable comic celebrity guest stars have include cartoonist Scott Kurtz of PVPonline, artist Dave Crosland, artist and creator of the Crow James O'Barr, artist Ben Templesmith, writer Mark Waid (as Richard's brother William), R. K. Milholland and Curt Franklin and Chris Haley of the Let's Be Friends Again web comic.

== Cast ==
- Joe Cucinotti as himself
- Barry Fuhrman as himself
- Ken Lowery as Vlad
- Richard Neal as himself
- Keli Wolfe as herself
- Chris Haley as Terry
- Curt Franklin as Svenus Jorgin

== Episodes ==
No. overall	No. in season	Title	Original release date
1	1	"Pilot"	August 4, 2009
Joe misses out on a limited hardcover and can't recover a copy for himself.).
2	2	"Dead Man's Comics"	August 31, 2009
In discovering a vintage comic, Joe discovers his co-workers' ignorance in Kurt Russell filmography.
3	3	"The Upsell"	October 4, 2009
The crew gets into character in order to increase sales.
4	4	"Passholes"	November 3, 2009
A movie pass giveaway forces the employees in the store overnight. Can they keep back the hordes and survive until dawn?
5	5	"The Signing"	November 1, 2009
The gang hosts a comic book signing for guests Scott Kurtz and Dave Crosland, but they may be too much for the store to handle.
6	6	"The Heist"	January 5, 2010
Joe accidentally sells a comic from a customer's pull box. Now Joe and Keli have to track down another copy at another store while Richard and Barry handle a comic convention solicitor.
7	7	"Tsunami"	February 2, 2010
An upset customer leads to the staff changing job responsibilities.
8	8	"Manga Mia"	March 2, 2010
Joe's keeping a secret and the rest of the store is determined to get to the bottom of it.
9	9	"Power Outage"	April 6, 2010
The staff suspects losing sales to a street vendor while dealing with a loss of power and sanity.
10	10	"Serious Business"	May 4, 2010
Richard brings comics artist superstar Ben Templesmith to Dallas to generate some revenue for the store in dire times. But just how dire are they? Only Keli seems to have a hint, and Richard is more distracted than usual. Joe and Barrys rivalry also heats up with the arrival of Templesmith. Who will he side with?
11	11	"Serious Business, Part 2"	May 11, 2010
Plans are set in motion as Barry and Vlad try to undo Ben's influence, but the outcome reveals bigger consequences. Starring Ben Templesmith

=== Season 2 ===
No. overall	No. in season	Title	Original release date
12	1	"Think Bigger"	May 3, 2011
The store is under the control of the IRS and Joe, Keli, Barry, Richard and Vlad are all struggling to make ends meet in horrible jobs.
13	2	"Think Bigger, part 2"	June 1, 2011
Keli and Joe are on speaking terms again, and it couldn't come too soon. Richard's in jail, the IRS still has the store and Barry is trying to find satisfaction in the Vertical Smile.
14	3	"Man Jam"	July 7, 2011
The gang's back together and they're all agreed: they need to get Zeus back from Agent Johnson of the IRS, but they need to raise $10,000, and fast. A bake sale might just be what they need: tarts, cupcakes and even some baked goods. But will it be enough?
15	4	"Roll for Initiative"	August 4, 2011
We find our intrepid heroes on a dangerous quest to save their kingdom from the curse of the warble beast… and it's not going well. The Variants are in incredible danger and may not make it out of this enchanted land alive. Who is behind it? Who is pulling the strings and setting events against their favor?
16	5	"Reboot"	September 1, 2011
After a particularly memorable first date Keli returns to work to find that things have... changed. Richard's a womanizer. Barry's got a goatee. Vlad's helping at the counter. And Joe... hey, where IS Joe? Has the world changed forever, or will we find out things are not as different as advertised?
17	6	"Fat Pants"	November 3, 2011
Keli slowly comes to realize the honeymoon is over in her new relationship, while Barry tries to teach an eager would-be self-publisher named Eddie the facts of the comic peddling life. And who better than Barry to teach Eddie what it takes to really make it in the business?
18	7	"Where There's A Will, There's A Waid"	December 20, 2011
Richard's brother William (Mark Waid) visits Zeus with a confession! But the staff is in on the secret as the brothers devolve into juvenile antics.
19	8	"The Sellouts"	February 1, 2011
A potential investor(Curt Franklin) and his attorney(Chris Haley) turn the store upside down. Can the Zeus employees handle their scrutiny, or will they throw each other under the idiot bus in pursuit of vacation days and dental?

=== Season 3 ===
No. overall	No. in season	Title	Original release date
20	1	"Zeus Comics Worldwide Baby"	September 5, 2012
Terry and Svenus are filming the first commercial for the Zeus Comics Worldwide initiative, and everybody's on board -- everybody except Keli and Barry, that is. But Terry and Svenus have ways of bringing them to heel.
21	2	"Con Game"	September 12, 2012
To clear some dead stock, Svenus accompanies Keli and Richard to a convention. A booth babe and some seriously unfortunate cosplay pushes Keli to the edge.
22	3	"Dicks on Comics"	September 19, 2012
Tension mounts in the store when Terry and Svenus recruit Alan Smithee, noted filmmaker and comic book nerd, to bring his new reality show to Zeus Comics.
23	4	"The Deceivers"	September 26, 2012
The cold war between Keli and Zeus's new owners turns hot when she retaliates for the Alan Smithee debacle by bringing her OWN reality TV crew to Zeus.
24	5	"These Boots Are Made For Walking"	October 3, 2012
Terry makes Keli pay for her insubordination, and then decides to take a shot at running the store himself.
25	6	"Occupy Zeus"	October 10, 2012
Keli isn't taking her firing from Zeus lying down. She's rounded up sympathetic Zeus loyalists and protests the store's new direction under Terry and Svenus. But is her cause lost before she even begins.
26	7	"Girl Drink Drunk"	October 17, 2012
27	8	"Breaking In"	October 24, 2012
28	9	"I Love Money"	October 30, 2012
29	10	"Behind the Svenus"	November 7, 2012
