= Doraleous & Associates =

American animated web series

- Genre: Fantasy comedy; Adventure
- Created by: Brent Triplett; Jon Etheridge; Bryan Mahoney; Tony Schnur; Nate Panning
- Written by: Brent Triplett; Jon Etheridge; Bryan Mahoney; Tony Schnur; Nate Panning
- Voices of: Brent Triplett; Jon Etheridge; Bryan Mahoney; Tony Schnur; Nate Panning
- Theme music composer: Alex Beard
- Composer: Alex Beard
- Country of origin: United States
- Original language: English
- No. of seasons: 3
- No. of episodes: 50

Production
- Animators: Brent Triplett; Jon Etheridge; Sheila Brothers
- Running time: 3–11 minutes
- Production companies: Hank & Jed Movie Pictures

Original release
- Network: The Escapist
- Release: January 21, 2010 – July 9, 2017

Doraleous & Associates is an American animated web series created by Hank & Jed Movie Pictures, originally distributed by The Escapist until series hosted on Machinima in 2012.

In 2012 the series was removed by The Escapist website after Hank & Jed regained the right, the series was rereleased on Machinima. In 2013 season 3 officially set premiered on Hank & Jed YouTube channel.

== Episodes ==
=== Season 1 (2010) ===
No. overall	No. in season	Title	Original release date
1	1	"Open for Business"	January 21, 2010
2	2	"The War Room"	January 28, 2010
3	3	"Battle of Wetald"	February 4, 2010
4	4	"Troll Bridge"	February 11, 2010
5	5	"Fight of the Weak"	February 18, 2010
6	6	"Mightopolis"	February 25, 2010
7	7	"The Dungeon"	March 4, 2010
8	8	"The Gift"	March 11, 2010
9	9	"Party Canceled"	March 18, 2010
10	10	"Calas' Revenge"	March 25, 2010
