= Cell: The Web Series =

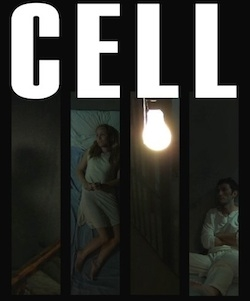
- Genre: Sci-Fi/Drama
- Created by: Mark Gardner
- Directed by: Mark Gardner
- Starring: Danny Cameron; Jourdan Gibson; Kevin McCarthy
- Theme music composer: Brian Satterwhite
- Composer: Brian Satterwhite
- Original language: English
- No. of seasons: 1

Production
- Producer: Mark Gardner
- Production location: Smithville, Texas
- Running time: Varies (7-10 minutes)

Original release
- Network: Koldcast.tv
- Release: February 3 – July 28, 2010

Cell: The Web Series is an Austin, Texas-based science fiction/drama web series which debuted Feb 03, 2010 on Koldcast.tv. Cell: The Web Series is about a man wakes up in a cell after a night on the town. When he realizes he’s not in jail and he’s not alone, he fights to stay who he is while helping someone else remember who they were.

After streaming exclusively on Koldcast.tv for over a year, CELL recently expanded its streaming hosts to include Blip.TV as well as YouTube. Because of earlier restrictions placed on the length of content on YouTube, not all episodes could be streamed through the service. After YouTube expanded the time allowed for episodes, the entire first season was placed on YouTube.

== Reception ==
=== Critical reception ===
CELL: The Web Series has been accepted into four international festivals.

- 2010 Independent Television Festival - Los Angeles
- 2010 Cinema Tous Ecrans - Geneva, Switzerland
- 2010 Beverly Hills Film, Television, and New Media Festival - Beverly Hills
- 2011 LA Web Fest - Los Angeles

=== Awards ===
Season 1 of CELL: The Web Series received nominations and won several awards since its release.

2010	Indie Intertube Awards		
	WINNER	Best Thriller	
	WINNER	Best Actress in a Drama	Jourdan Gibson
	WINNER	Best Supporting Actor in a Drama	Kevin McCarthy
	WINNER	Best Villain	Kevin McCarthy
	WINNER	Best Set Design	Stephen Fay, Dan Saner
	WINNER	Best Score	Brian Satterwhite
	nominated	Best Directing in a Drama	Mark Gardner
	nominated	Best Writing in a Drama	Mark Gardner
	nominated	Best Actor in a Drama	Danny Cameron
	nominated	Best Guest Performance	Beth Chamberlin
	nominated	Best Editing	Chris Zeid, Loren Melchor
	nominated	Best Sound Design	Matt Crawford
	nominated	Audience Choice Award	
	nominated	WTF Moment	Episode 11
	nominated	Best Web Series	
2010	Indie Soap Awards		
	WINNER	Best Sound Design	Matt Crawford
	nominated	Indie Soap of the Year	
	nominated	Outstanding Lead Actor	Danny Cameron
	nominated	Outstanding Lead Actress	Jourdan Gibson
	nominated	Outstanding Writing	Mark Gardner
	nominated	Outstanding Directing	Mark Gardner
	nominated	Outstanding Guest Appearance	Beth Chamberlin
	nominated	Outstanding Editing	Chris Zeid, Loren Melchor
2011	LA Web Festival		
	WINNER	Outstanding Drama	
	WINNER	Outstanding Score	Brian Satterwhite
	WINNER	Outstanding Cinematography	Iskra Valtcheva
2011	International Film Music Festival		
	nominated	Jerry Goldsmith Award	Brian Satterwhite
2011	International Academy of Web Television Awards		
Winners announced January 12, 2012
	nominated	Best Drama	
	nominated	Best Writing - Drama	Mark Gardner
	nominated	Best Female Performance - Drama	Jourdan Gibson
	nominated	Best Male Performance - Drama	Kevin McCarthy
	nominated	Best Original Music	Brian Satterwhite
	nominated	Best Cinematography	Iskra Valtcheva, Michael Morlan

== Characters ==
- Brian - Played by Danny Cameron.
- The Man - Played by Kevin McCarthy.
- Woman - Played by Jourdan Gibson.
- Brenda - Played by Beth Chamberlin.

== Future ==
Season 2 is under development and awaiting funding.
