= Hopes & Dreams =

Studio album by Faster Faster
- Released: August 12, 2008
- Genre: Pop-Punk; Power pop
- Label: Oort Records
- Producer: Lee Dyess

Faster Faster chronology
Pillow Talk 101 (2006)	Hopes & Dreams (2008)

Professional ratings
Review scores
Source	Rating
AbsolutePunk.net	(91%)
AbsolutePunk.net	(83%)

Hopes & Dreams is the debut studio album by Georgia-based rock band Faster Faster, released to stores and digitally in the United States on August 12, 2008. It is their first and only album on Oort Records, following the success of their debut EP, Pillow Talk 101, in 2006.

== Track listing ==
1. "I'm Drawn To You Sweetheart" – 3:48
2. "Girl Named Gasoline" – 4:00
3. "Backstabbing Never Seemed So Friendly" – 4:01
4. "They Call It Lust, We Call It A Good Time" – 3:13
5. "Matchsticks Don't Make Men" – 3:51
6. "Fairytales and Lullabies" – 3:10
7. "A Moment in Sheets" – 5:24
8. "From My TV Screen To Your Bedroom" – 2:57
9. "Forever..." – 2:36
10. "...And Always" – 3:05
11. "These Are The Days" – 4:36
12. "You're Killing Me Smalls" (Japanese Bonus Track) - 3:23

=== b-sides ===
1. "Set The Stage" – 1:52
2. "These Are The Days" (Remix) – 4:34
3. "From My TV Screen To Your Bedroom (Demo)

== Notes ==
- Music videos were shot for both "I'm Drawn to you Sweetheart" and "From My TV Screen to Your Bedroom"
- Due to the fact that Jet Turner from Dora Maar was a featured musician on the album the song "They Call It Lust, We Call It a Good Time" is believed to possibly be a reference to Doraa Maar's song titled "Call it Lust", in return Turner's new band, The Shootout! wrote a song responding called, "They Call It A Good Time, We Call It Date Rape".

== Personnel & Credits ==
- Kyle Davis – Vocals
- Randall Dowling – Vocals, Guitar, Keys
- Christian Mosely – Guitar, Keys
- Joey Poppell – Bass Guitar
- Trevor Aspinwall – Drums, Percussion
- Lee Dyess – Keys, Cello, Programing
- Lurch – Upright Bass on "They Call It Lust, We Call It A Good Time"
- Jet Turner – Additional Vocals on "...And Always"
- All music written by Faster Faster
- All lyrics written by Kyle Davis and Randall Dowling except "Girl Named Gasoline", "They Call It Lust, We Call It A Good Time" by Christian Mosely, Kyle Davis, and Randall Dowling
- Produced, Recorded, and Mixed by Lee Dyes
- Mastered at Earthsound Studios in Valdosta, GA
- Design and Layout by Jerrod Landon Porter at www.iheartjlp.com
- Band Photography by Daniel Shippey
