= Feed Me Bubbe =

Jewish cooking show and podcast

- Genre: Kosher Yiddish cooking

Cast and voices
- Hosted by: Bertha Jonas and Avrom Honig

Publication
- Original release: Friday, June 16, 2006 – Thursday, August 7, 2014
- Updates: No Schedule

Feed Me Bubbe was a low budget Jewish cooking show starring Bertha Jonas. "Bubbe" is the Yiddish word for "Grandmother." Jonas's grandson Avrom introduced each show from her kitchen in Worcester, Massachusetts declaring "Bubbe" one of the three words he needs to know when he is hungry and looking for Kosher food.

== History ==
The series was produced by Chalutz Productions (Chalutz is Hebrew for "pioneer"). Feed Me Bubbe is part of the new trend in podcasting known as "Vodcast."

Being mentioned in British newspapers, as well as Avrom and Bubbe being guests or highlighted on many other podcasts, has led to Feed Me Bubbe quickly gaining a wide audience and becoming noted.

In each episode Bubbe introduces a recipe, teaches how to cook it, and shares stories from her past; also included is a feature entitled "Yiddish Word of the Day," in which Avrom learns a new Yiddish word from Bubbe. A more recently added segment—"Ask Bubbe"—features Bubbe answering viewer questions and feedback.

In 2011, Honig and Jonas published a book called Feed Me Bubbe: Recipes and Wisdom from America's Favorite Online Grandmother. The book received a Mom's Choice Award and was voted the best new Kosher cookbook in 2011.

Jonas died on August 7, 2014. Her husband and videographer Bernard ("Zaide", Yiddish for grandfather) died May 18, 2015.

The first episode was released on Instant Media on June 16, 2006. Each episode is approximately 7 to 15 minutes long. The show is broadcast on Jewish Life Television.

Feed Me Bubbe was one of the shows launched by Instant Media Network. Within its first month over 300 subscribers had made Feed Me Bubbe one of the network's most popular vodcasts. In the first annual Vloggie Awards Feed Me Bubbe was nominated in the cooking category.

== Characters ==
- Bubbe Avrom's grandmother, co-host, and chef
- Avrom producer and co-host of Feed Me Bubbe
- Zaide Bubbe's husband, videographer

While the character of "Bubbe" is a stage name meaning "Grandmother," Bubbe was Honig's real-life grandmother and her real name was not used in the show. She often used the alias "Bayla Sher" (her Yiddish first name with her maiden last name) for media appearances, to further protect her identity.
