= OzGirl =

- Genre: Drama, comedy
- Starring: Sophie Tilson; Shanrah Wakefield; Richard Askin
- Country of origin: Australia
- Original language: English
- No. of seasons: 1
- No. of episodes: 24

Production
- Running time: Five to seven minutes

Original release
- Network: YouTube; Bebo; KoldCast TV
- Release: 8 February – 25 June 2009

OzGirl is an Australian web series that aired from February to June, 2009. It consists of 24 episodes, each between five and seven minutes long. The final episode was broadcast live on-air.

== Story ==
OzGirl tells the story of Sadie Brown, a small-town, country girl who moves to Melbourne, where she lives with her cousin Megan. The show explores Sadie's efforts to make friends, get a job, pursue her passion for photography, meet "Mr. Right", fall in love, and find her long-lost mother.

It started out as an experiment in the use of social networking as a medium for building a community.

OzGirl established a "solid audience across a range of platforms including Fairfax Digital, Virgin Australia, KoldCast TV, Apple iTunes, Microsoft Zune and TiVo." The series has been described as "Australia's first social web show in which the characters exist within the audience's existing social networks and interact with them as they would if they were real people."

== Cast ==
- Sophie Tilson - Sadie Brown
- Shanrah Wakefield - Megan Brown
- Richard Askin - George Sullivan
- Nicola Collie - Lisa
- Joel Famularo - Tony
- James O'Halloran - Patrick
- Janet Watson Kruse - Robyn Brown
- Bradley Williams - Hot Guy

== Recognition and awards ==
- 2009 ITVFest (Independent Television Festival) – Best Web Series
- 2009 ITVFest (Independent Television Festival) – Best Acting
- 2010 Streamy Award - Best Foreign Web Series
