= Pillow Talk 101 =

EP by Faster Faster
- Released: April 21st, 2006
- Genre: Pop-Punk; Power Pop

Faster Faster chronology
Pillow Talk 101 (2006)	Hopes & Dreams (2008)

Pillow Talk 101 is the first EP by Georgia-based rock band Faster Faster, sold at local shows and digitally in the US on April 21, 2006.

== Track listing ==
=== According to Download Punk ===
1. "Thanks to Cuba Gooding Jr." – 4:22
2. "Girl Named Gasoline" – 3:45
3. "A Moment in Sheets" – 5:10
4. "Grip Them Hips Gracie" – 3:44

=== Remastered Version ===
1. "Girl Named Gasoline" – 3:45
2. "A Moment in Sheets" – 5:12
3. "Grip Them Hips Gracy" – 3:44
4. "Manilow vs Baio" - 5:06
5. "Thanks to Cuba Gooding Jr." – 4:23

=== Notes ===
- Two songs by the band that were not listed on the Download Punk track list are "Going, Going, Gone" and "Manilow Vs. Baio". "Manilow" has been confirmed by members of the band to be on the actual track list, however "Going, Going, Gone" has not
- A Music videos was shot for "Grip Them Hips Gracie"
- As part of the bands reunion, they released a re-mastered version of the EP on May 1st, 2021
