= A World Without (web series) =

Argentine animated web series

- Un Mundo Sin
- Genre: Animation; Absurd humor Science fiction
- Created by: Matías Sinay; Santiago Pérez Silva
- Written by: Matías Sinay; Augusto Sinay; Juan Quinteros; Chavo Saraintaris
- Directed by: Matías Sinay; Santiago Pérez Silva
- Composers: Nacho Rozental; Hernán Soria
- Country of origin: Argentina
- Original language: Spanish
- No. of seasons: 9
- No. of episodes: 70

Production
- Producers: Matias Sinay; Santiago Pérez Silva

Original release
- Network: YouTube
- Release: 30 August 2019 – present

Related
- The Scientists; 1 Minute in the Future

A World Without (Spanish: Un Mundo Sin) is an Argentine animated web series created by Matías Sinay and Santiago Pérez Silva (known online as "Picho Brazo"), who have worked together since 2018.

A World Without has 8 complete seasons, over 200 million combined views on YouTube, and more than a billion combined views on Facebook and TikTok. In 2022, the episode "Un Mundo Sin... Dolor" (A World Without... Pain) became one of the top ten most viewed videos in Argentina. Thanks to its popularity, Sinay and Silva were able to produce official dubbed versions with captions in English and Portuguese and create a spin-off series titled The Scientists (or Los Científicos in Spanish).

== Plot ==
Each episode is centered around the daily life of a parallel world, but without a certain object from our world (like pockets, maps or wheels), a certain symbol (the word "no", the letter A, or the number 2), or elements of nature (water, fire, gravity, etc.), usually resulting in a utopia or dystopia. In some episodes, three scientists (Tom, Teo, and Trini) search for a solution for problems in the parallel world without achieving much success or true advancement. The web series is presented in short animations that frequently use dark humour and double entendres, often making references to popular culture. Due to the diverse themes, the episodes often make many references to films, video games, and characters in popular culture, such as Jesus Christ, Galileo Galilei or Diego Armando Maradona, as well as many others.

== Production ==
=== Concept and creation ===
The idea for the web series came in 2018 to director and screenwriter Matías Sinay, who was born in Córdoba, Argentina. As reported, he started thinking "what would life be like in a world without pockets" (and what would be used in place of them) and the idea to produce a series later arose, along with the idea of making it a science fiction comedy. While searching for someone to produce the show with, he met Santiago Pérez Silva on Instagram and made him his partner. After telling Silva about the idea, they worked together to create A World Without.

The first episode was finished and published in 2019, titled "Un Mundo Sin... Bolsillos" (A World Without... Pockets). The first episodes were uploaded to Instagram, and in late 2020, they created their own channel on YouTube. The official Spanish-language channel was called Un Mundo Sin until June 2022, when it was changed to Naisekai.

The name Naisekai was derived from Japanese and has two main components:

1. ない (nai): A term denoting absence, inexistence, or negation. In this context, one could interpret it as "that which does not exist" or "nonexistent".
2. 世界 (sekai): Which means "world".

In conjunction, the name references the name of the series in Japanese. (のない世界, in romaji: No nai sekai).

Among the works that Sinay has cited as influences in the creation of the series, analogues could be observed with science fiction, including the works of Ray Bradbury, and shows like Alejo y Valentina (another Argentine web series), Rick and Morty, Futurama, and Love, Death & Robots.

=== Production ===
Matías Sinay, who is the screenwriter, directs all of the episodes and writes the scripts, while Santiago Pérez is the director of animation, and is responsible for all production in that area. In the beginning of the show they were the only members of the production team, but the team grew as the show became more popular online. By 2022, the team had grown to 12 people. The ones that are best known are:

- Production: Matías Sinay, Santiago Pérez Silva
- Direction of animation: Santiago Pérez Silva o Luciana Muñoz
- Scripting: Matías Sinay, Augusto Sinay, Juan Quinteros, Chavo Saraintaris
- Music: Nacho Rozental, Hernán Soria
- Sound: Melisa Stasiak

As well as those in charge of storyboarding, animation, and background.

According to Pérez Silva, an episode takes approximately 20 days to complete, from writing the script to finalising the animation.

The main musical theme that is used in the show is an excerpt from the 1874 piano suite, Pictures at an Exhibition, composed by Modest Músorgsky.

== Characters ==
- Narrator: The presenter that starts the episode by announcing the title of the episode. Although he is never presented directly to the audience in the episodes, he appears as a presenter in the top videos.
- The Scientists: A trio of researchers whose projects account for the absence of objects or concepts in their parallel universe. They make the most appearances throughout the series.
  - Tom: He is usually the one who comes up with ideas to move projects forward. He has a taste for mathematics and is prone to overthinking. In the episode "A World Without... Names", he is revealed to be 34 years old and a doctorate in biotechnology.
  - Trini: The only female member. She is the most adventurous and has the most common sense of the team. She usually tries to search for solutions in experiments when things go wrong.
  - Teo: He has been a test subject in several of the team's experiments, contributing to the fact that he has died the most of the trio throughout the series. He is generally the least serious and professional of his group, as he has been seen creating very dangerous inventions and disobeying work protocols.
- John and Barbara: A sentimental couple that appear recurrently in the episodes. They represent a form of parody of the stereotypical couple, with exaggerated romantic clichés, like passionate declarations of love.

== Episodes ==
Series	Episodes	Originally released	
Series	Episodes	First released	Last released
1	8	30 August 2019	14 December 2019
2	9	4 April 2020	24 October 2020
3	11	15 May 2021	22 April 2022
4	8	6 July 2022	11 November 2022
5	6	31 March 2023	14 July 2023
6	5	29 September 2023	1 December 2023
7	7	15 December 2023	15 June 2024
8	7	5 July 2024	24 December 2024
9	9	23 May 2025	TBA

=== Season 1 (2019) ===
No. overall	No. in season	Title	Original release date (Spanish)	Original release date (English)
1	1	"A World Without... Pockets" (Spanish: Un Mundo Sin... Bolsillos)	30 August 2019	14 July 2023
2	2	"A World Without... Chairs" (Spanish: Un Mundo Sin... Asientos)	14 September 2019	21 July 2023
3	3	"A World Without... Hugs" (Spanish: Un Mundo Sin... Abrazos)	28 September 2019	28 July 2023
4	4	"A World Without... Writing" (Spanish: Un Mundo Sin... Escritura)	12 October 2019	4 August 2023
5	5	"A World Without... Spheres" (Spanish: Un Mundo Sin... Esferas)	26 October 2019	11 August 2023
6	6	"A World Without... Clothes" (Spanish: Un Mundo Sin... Ropa)	16 November 2019	18 August 2023
7	7	"A World Without... Stairs" (Spanish: Un Mundo Sin... Escaleras)	30 November 2019	25 August 2023
8	8	"A World Without... Time" (Spanish: Un Mundo Sin... Tiempo)	14 December 2019	1 September 2023

=== Season 2 (2020) ===
No. overall	No. in season	Title	Original release date (Spanish)	Original release date (English)
9	1	"A World Without... Money" (Spanish: Un Mundo Sin... Dinero)	4 April 2020	25 October 2023
10	2	"A World Without... Fire" (Spanish: Un Mundo Sin... Fuego)	18 April 2020	18 October 2023
11	3	"A World Without... Number 2" (Spanish: Un Mundo Sin... El Número 2)	2 May 2020	1 November 2023
12	4	"A World Without... Paper" (Spanish: Un Mundo Sin... Papel)	16 May 2020	8 November 2023
13	5	"A World Without... Children" (Spanish: Un Mundo Sin... Niños)	5 June 2020	15 November 2023
14	6	"A World Without... Rulers" (Spanish: Un Mundo Sin... Reglas)	20 June 2020	29 November 2023
15	7	"A World Without... Bottles" (Spanish: Un Mundo Sin... Botellas)	4 July 2020	7 December 2023
16	8	"A World Without... Gravity" (Spanish: Un Mundo Sin... Gravedad)	19 July 2020	14 December 2023
17	9	"A World Without... Problems" (Spanish: Un Mundo Sin... Problemas)	24 October 2020	20 December 2023

=== Season 3 (2021–2022) ===
No. overall	No. in season	Title	Original release date (Spanish)	Original release date (English)
18	1	"A World Without... Music" (Spanish: Un Mundo Sin... Música)	15 May 2021	2 February 2024
19	2	"A World Without... Garbage" (Spanish: Un Mundo Sin... Basura)	7 July 2021	14 February 2024
Note: This episode was released in collaboration with the Government of the City of Buenos Aires.
20	3	"A World Without... Memory" (Spanish: Un Mundo Sin... Memoria)	16 July 2021	1 March 2024
Note: This episode was made in commemoration of the AMIA bombing.
21	4	"A World Without... Elbows" (Spanish: Un Mundo Sin... Codos)	2 October 2021	31 March 2024
22	5	"A World Without... Adults" (Spanish: Un Mundo Sin... Adultos)	8 December 2021	5 April 2024
23	6	"A World Without... Pain" (Spanish: Un Mundo Sin... Dolor)	14 January 2022	19 April 2024
24	7	"A World Without... Ducks" (Spanish: Un Mundo Sin... Patos)	5 February 2022	15 May 2024
25	8	"A World Without... Windows" (Spanish: Un Mundo Sin... Ventanas)	18 February 2022	7 June 2024
26	9	"A World Without... Decisions" (Spanish: Un Mundo Sin... Decisiones)	11 March 2022	12 July 2024
27	10	"A World Without... Religion" (Spanish: Un Mundo Sin... Religión)	30 March 2022	9 August 2024
28	11	"A World Without... Losers" (Spanish: Un Mundo Sin... Perdedores)	22 April 2022	26 July 2024

=== Season 4 (2022) ===
No. overall	No. in season	Title	Original release date (Spanish)	Original release date (English)
29	1	"A World Without... Sun" (Spanish: Un Mundo Sin... Sol)	6 July 2022	6 September 2024
30	2	"A World Without... Buttons" (Spanish: Un Mundo Sin... Botones)	22 July 2022	20 September 2024
31	3	"A World Without... Walls" (Spanish: Un Mundo Sin... Paredes)	12 August 2022	4 October 2024
32	4	"A World Without... Fear" (Spanish: Un Mundo Sin... Miedo)	26 August 2022	31 October 2024
33	5	"A World Without... War" (Spanish: Un Mundo Sin... Guerra)	9 September 2022	19 October 2024
34	6	"A World Without... Names" (Spanish: Un Mundo Sin... Nombres)	23 September 2022	15 November 2024
35	7	"A World Without... Wood" (Spanish: Un Mundo Sin... Madera)	14 October 2022	29 November 2024
36	8	"A World Without... End" (Spanish: Un Mundo Sin... Fin)	11 November 2022	13 December 2024

=== Season 5 (2023) ===
No. overall	No. in season	Title	Original release date (Spanish)	Original release date (English)
37	1	"A World Without... Maps" (Spanish: Un Mundo Sin... Mapas)	31 March 2023	10 January 2025
38	2	"A World Without... Sound" (Spanish: Un Mundo Sin... Sonido)	28 April 2023	24 January 2025
39	3	"A World Without... Wheels" (Spanish: Un Mundo Sin... Ruedas)	26 May 2023	7 February 2025
40	4	"A World Without... Humans" (Spanish: Un Mundo Sin... Humanos)	9 June 2023	21 February 2025
41	5	"A World Without... Mirrors" (Spanish: Un Mundo Sin... Espejos)	28 June 2023	7 March 2025
42	6	"A World Without... Cubes" (Spanish: Un Mundo Sin... Cubos)	14 July 2023	21 March 2025

=== Season 6 (2023) ===
No. overall	No. in season	Title	Original release date (Spanish)	Original release date (English)
43	1	"A World Without... Lies" (Spanish: Un Mundo Sin... Mentiras)	29 September 2023	18 April 2025
44	2	"A World Without... Fruit" (Spanish: Un Mundo Sin... Frutas)	13 October 2023	2 May 2025
45	3	"A World Without... Death" (Spanish: Un Mundo Sin... Muerte)	10 November 2023	30 May 2025
46	4	"A World Without... Waiting" (Spanish: Un Mundo Sin... Espera)	24 November 2023	16 May 2025
Note: This episode was released in collaboration with Plataforma 10, an Argentinian mass transportation service. In the English-language version, references to Plataforma 10 were replaced with the logo of a fictional service called Zip Zap Gone.
47	5	"A World Without... The Letter A" (Spanish: Un Mundo Sin... La letra A)	1 December 2023	14 June 2025

=== Season 7 (2023–2024) ===
No. overall	No. in season	Title	Original release date (Spanish)	Original release date (English)
48	1	"A World Without... Science" (Spanish: Un Mundo Sin... Ciencia)	15 December 2023	11 July 2025
49	2	"A World Without... Fingers" (Spanish: Un Mundo Sin... Dedos)	16 February 2024	25 July 2025
50	3	"A World Without... Houses" (Spanish: Un Mundo Sin... Casas)	29 March 2024	8 August 2025
51	4	"A World Without... Colors" (Spanish: Un Mundo Sin... Colores)	12 April 2024	5 September 2025
52	5	"A World Without... Friends" (Spanish: Un Mundo Sin... Amigos)	3 May 2024	22 August 2025
53	6	"A World Without... Water" (Spanish: Un Mundo Sin... Agua)	17 May 2024	18 September 2025
54	7	"A World Without... Video Games" (Spanish: Un Mundo Sin... Videojuegos)	15 June 2024	3 October 2025

=== Season 8 (2024) ===
No. overall	No. in season	Title	Original release date (Spanish)	Original release date (English)
55	1	"A World Without... Symmetry" (Spanish: Un Mundo Sin... Simetría)	5 July 2024	14 November 2025
56	2	"A World Without... Sports" (Spanish: Un Mundo Sin... Deportes)	26 July 2024	1 November 2025
57	3	"A World Without... Light" (Spanish: Un Mundo Sin... Luz)	30 August 2024	28 November 2025
58	4	"A World Without... NO" (Spanish: Un Mundo Sin... La palabra No)	28 September 2024	5 December 2025
59	5	"A World Without... Work" (Spanish: Un Mundo Sin... Trabajo)	25 October 2024	12 December 2025
60	6	"A World Without... Art" (Spanish: Un Mundo Sin... Arte)	6 December 2024	19 December 2025
61	7	"A World Without... Sense" (Spanish: Un Mundo Sin... Sentido)	24 December 2024	9 January 2026

=== Season 9 (2025–present) ===
No. overall	No. in season	Title	Original release date (Spanish)	Original release date (English)
62	1	"A World Without... Internet" (Spanish: Un Mundo Sin... Internet)	23 May 2025	13 February 2026
63	2	"A World Without... Ground" (Spanish: Un Mundo Sin... Suelo)	3 April 2026	3 April 2026
64	3	"A World Without... Mouths" (Spanish: Un Mundo Sin... Bocas)	1 May 2026	1 May 2026
65	4	"A World Without... Tools" (Spanish: Un Mundo Sin... Herramientas)	5 June 2026	5 June 2026
66	5	"A World Without... Metaphors" (Spanish: Un Mundo Sin... Metáforas)	4 July 2026	4 July 2026
67	6	"A World Without... Bones" (Spanish: Un Mundo Sin... Huesos)	14 August 2026	14 August 2026
68	7	"A World Without... Night" (Spanish: Un Mundo Sin... Noche)	18 September 2026	18 September 2026
69	8	"A World Without... Shoes" (Spanish: Un Mundo Sin... Zapatos)	23 October 2026	23 October 2026
70	9	"A World Without... Laws" (Spanish: Un Mundo Sin... Leyes)	21 November 2026	21 November 2026

== Video game ==
On 15 June 2024, Naisekai announced the launch of A World Without... Videogames (original title Un Mundo Sin... Videojuegos), a mobile game based on the show for IOS and Android. Developed by the Argentine company Pathfinders Studio, it is a video game that follows the style of a visual novel where one can collect items, personalise their own character, play various minigames, and complete missions alongside the three scientists. On the same day, an episode of the same name was released to promote the game.

== Spinoff ==
A spinoff of A World Without, titled The Scientists (original title Los Científicos), was announced on 17 February 2023 on the Naisekai YouTube channel. As the title suggests, the three scientists from the original show are the protagonists of this spinoff, which focuses on their experiments and inventions unrelated to their solutions for the parallel universes. After the release of a trailer in March 2023, the first episode of the show was uploaded on 26 April that year, and an English-language dub of it was uploaded on 27 February 2026.
