= Copy & Pastry =

Comedic web series

Copy & Pastry is a comedic web series produced by Two Trick Pony Productions. Copy & Pastry follows two roommates who decide to start an online pastry delivery service out of their home kitchen in Berkeley, CA. The first season, consisting of 7 episodes, debuted in November 2009.

== Background ==
Copy & Pastry was created by Tory Stanton and Scott McCabe, who also wrote and produced each of the 7 episodes. The comedy web series follows fictional roommates Tory and Scott whose 'ambitions outpace their resources' in their quixotic attempt to build an online pastry delivery service out of their home apartment. In order to succeed the pair must negotiate the bureaucracy of municipal government; limited funding; nosebleeds; fickle customers; a brush with the biggest star on public-access television cable TV; broken hearts; and a proposed corporate takeover. The self-financed series was directed JK Pincosy and shot by Justin Potter. Luca Young composed the original score and Alex Bello mixed the episodes.

Copy & Pastry was also picked up by the web television network [Koldcast.tv] with the first episode premiering on the network March 3.

== Reception ==
According to the Eastbay Express, which reviewed the series in its January 6 edition, 'The whole thing would make for a perfect TV show.' The website alterna-tv.com, which reviews television and new media, said of the show: "Despite a proliferation of original webseries sprouting up on the Internet, it is still somewhat of a rarity to find one produced by truly independent industry outsides that is also well-written, well-acted, polished and entertaining... The writing, for instance, is as tight and funny as anything on television—let alone the Internet..." PopCultureMonster.com said the show was "fresh (pun intended)... and [...] filled with both jokes and a lovely bit of slap-stick." and that the actors were "very funny, awkward and awfully adorkable" It was reviewed positively by Ned Hepburn's web series column Pass the Mustard.

"[McCabe & Stanton] have cobbled together an impressive series out of a few thousand, good writing and a few twenty-something comedians..." writes Doniphan Blair in Cinesource Magazine.

== Cast ==
| ACTOR | ROLE |
|---|---|
| Tory Stanton | Tory |
| Scott McCabe | Scott |
| Casi Maggio | Penelope Nicholls |
| David Weise | Lesley Lindsay |
| Rana Weber | Patty Plumbopple |
| Matt Gunnison | Health Inspector Vick |
| Dick Kellogg | Businessman Rodney |
| Nathaniel G. Fuller | Peter Plumbopple |
| Lee Stoneman | Terry |
| Melanie Case | Clarice |
| Jai Sahai | Ryan |
