= Affif Ben Badra =

French actor and stuntman

Affif Ben Badra (sometimes credited as Afif Ben Badra or Ben Badra, born 1960) is an actor and stuntman currently living in France. In the United States, he appeared as a warlord in the Roland Emmerich film 10,000 BC and as Tamas Morato in Sherlock Holmes: A Game of Shadows. He also appeared in the suspense/thriller film Taken, written by Luc Besson, and in the Spanish public TV series Aguila Roja

== Partial filmography ==
- Dobermann (1997) - Le mac
- Kiss of the Dragon (2001)
- San-Antonio (2004) - Le Brésilien
- Distrito B13 (2004) - chico K2
- Unleashed (2005) - Tough Man
- Il ne faut jurer... de rien! (2005) - Bulevar Homme 1
- Paris Lockdown (2007) - Le Gitan 1
- Jacquou le croquant (2007) - Le berger moustachu
- Skate or Die (2008) - Le Marseillais
- Mesrine Parte 1: Killer Instinct (2008) - Le client énervé
- 10,000 BC (2008) - Warlord
- Balance final (2011) - Latif Gueroud
- Colombiana (2011) - Genarro Rizzo
- Sherlock Holmes: A Game of Shadows (2011) - Tamas Morato
- The Lookout (2012) - Karim
- Al otro lado de las pistas (2012) - Tripot Homme
- Praschan Requiem (2012) - Mafioso
- Colisión (2013) - Ayub
- Un p'tit gars de Ménilmontant (2013) - Greg
- Hermandad de Lágrimas (2013) - Omar
- 8 Assassins (2014) - Sharkan
- Piste noire (2014) - Slimane, le directeur de la colo
- Grimsby (2016) - Terapeuta de Spa
- El teniente otomano (2017) - Christapor
