= Deleted – The Game =

2008 web series

Deleted – The Game is an interactive web drama developed by indie producers GEN247 about a group of characters who unwittingly become entangled in an identity theft scheme to rig the 2008 United States presidential election. The show's creators combined a 12-webisode drama series with a sprawling interactive social game that allowed the audience to help the show's characters solve problems and puzzles along the way communicating through popular social media like MySpace and Facebook and blogs. In the course of these interactions with the characters, the audience would affect the way events in the story unfolded.

== Production ==
The project was conceived in March 2008, went into production in May 2008. A pre-marketing campaign was released June 2008 quickly finding a following on the ARG site Unfiction. The show was officially launched on 15 August 2008 on the Deleted – The Game website but was widely distributed on a creative commons license sharealike scheme through YouTube, Kewego and iTunes.

Filming took place entirely in the New York environs with audience members noting that a fair number of scenes were filmed in the New York's West Village and Meat Packing District although latter scenes did play out in Brooklyn's Williamsburg neighborhood. There are various accounts of the production budget but the project seems to have been produced on a $1,000 to $2,000 per minute scale.

We [GEN247] write, produce, and shoot four episodes at a time. It starts by planning and anticipating each scenario; we have alternate scripts handy, but we've had to shoot fill-in sequences and re-configure the game elements on the fly in case a player cracked (a particular challenge) at the last minute. Keeping the faith with the interactive ideal is a huge stress on the workflow.

— Tilzy.tv interview

== Reviews ==
The show itself is well-shot and seethes with appropriate tension. Fans of interactive story-telling experiences like The Lost Experience, The Dark Knight promotion and Halo 2's impressively vexing I Love Bees will find this a worthy addition to the genre. Interactive experiences like this are what the Internet was built for ... For reasons of personal preference, we will avoid exploring how incredibly creepy it seems to go on a huge web scavenger hunt in order to receive some fake girl's phone number. But, please, by all means, you go forward with it.

— Tubefilter

While you might remember the general concept of an ARG from the plotline of the 1997 movie The Game, an actual, real world ARG has as of yet failed to capture a mass American audience. Gen247Media is trying to change that. It's a production company that specializes in ARGs that blend seamlessly with originally produced web series. Their current production is Deleted, a mystery thriller that revolves around the threat of identity theft and the danger of trusting invaluable information to companies run by oh-so-corruptible human beings ... The balance between the game and narrative is the most impressive thing about Deleted, although the quality of the show itself has to be taken into account. After all, if you don't care about the characters, you'll have a hard time being engaged in a game where the object is to help protect them.

— Tilzy.tv

DELETED: the Game, however seems to pulling together several of the aspects that make an online experience so great - and I'm not just talking about video. With this show you've got the standard web-series, you've got the online game thing, you've got social websites involved and you've got the whole crowd sourcing thing (meaning the audience influences the plot) all rolled into one. This is about as close to total user immersion experience as you can get without actually being on the set filming with them…well, actually this is the big prize if you win. And speaking of prizes, you've got the chance of winning prizes each episode, which seems kinda cool 'cause that means you don't have to have been there from the beginning in order to take part.

— Online Video Review

== Awards ==
13th Webby Awards, June 8, 2009 - The title was officially nominated and won the People's Voice Award for Best Experimental Online Film & Video category and was made an official honoree for Best Use of Interactive Video.

14th Webby Awards, June, 2010 - The title was officially nominated for Best Experimental Online Film & Video category and Best Use of Interactive Video.
