= The Adventures of a Sexual Miscreant =

- Genre: Comedy
- Created by: Andrew Hevia
- Written by: Andrew Hevia
- Directed by: Andrew Hevia
- Starring: Eric Anderson; Pam Bruno; Irene Morales; Oni Perez; Jessica Gross
- Country of origin: United States
- Original language: English
- No. of seasons: 2
- No. of episodes: 9

Production
- Executive producer: Andrew Hevia
- Producer: Jessica Gross
- Production locations: Miami, FL
- Editor: Andrew Hevia
- Running time: < 2 minutes
- Production companies: One Eight Five, LLC.

Original release
- Network: Blip.tv
- Release: September 25 – October 31, 2010

The Adventures of a Sexual Miscreant is a comedy web series created by Andrew Hevia and produced by stand-up comedian Jessica Gross. Filmed in Miami, Florida, the series focuses on "sex and the people who have it" and is told through quick, comedic episodes each lasting about one minute. Each season of the show runs close to five minutes and tells one complete story arc with a rotating cast, composed mostly of stand-up comedians from the South Florida comedy scene. The series is hosted by Blip.tv. As of this writing, two seasons have been released.

== History ==
The series is based on a short film written and directed by Andrew Hevia while he was a student at the Florida State University Film School. After sitting in development for several years, the current iteration of the project came about when Jessica Gross decided to produce it, scheduling and casting the series and telling Mr. Hevia when and where to show up.

== Format ==
In an interview published on The Heat Lightning, Hevia is said to prefer "working on projects that aren’t actor-dependent, ones where the product lives or dies by the talent of the actors. He’s trying to develop a style where he can create what he wants no matter who the actor is, using editing to propel the series."

== Plot ==
=== Season 1 ===
The five episode arc concerns a May–December romance between a quiet woman and an awkwardly forward young man.

=== Season 2 ===
The four episode arc focuses on a domestic couple and a vampiric role play attempt that ends with surprising results.

== Cast ==
- Eric Anderson
- Pam Bruno
- Oni Perez
- Irene Morales
- Jessica Gross

=== Crew ===
Written, directed, shot and edited by Andrew Hevia. Produced by Jessica Gross. Gaffing and production sound recording by Joey Daoud.

== Production Notes ==
The season one story arc was inspired by the sex advice column Savage Love, written by Dan Savage. Hevia has been an avid reader of the column for many years.

The opening title sequence changed after season one. The first season title sequence featured producer Jessica Gross putting on lipstick. The second season title sequence featured Ms. Gross putting on eyeliner.
