= Happy Hour Tales =

American animated web series

Happy Hour Tales is an American animated web series created by Machinima, this series have incorporate fan fiction and story ideas into the narrative to each episodes.

The first season included Trial of the Songbird ran April 14, 2013 to August 25, 2013.

The second season included Bill & Kratos' Excellent Adventure ran May 26, 2013 to April 26, 2014

== Episodes ==
Season	Title	Episodes	Originally released	
Season	Title	Episodes	First released	Last released
1	Trial of the Songbird	4	April 14, 2013	August 25, 2013
2	Bill & Kratos' Excellent Adventure	4	May 26, 2013	April 26, 2014

=== Season 1: Trial of the Songbird (2013) ===
No. overall	No. in season	Title	Written by	Original release date
1	1	"Episode 1"	Matt Kowalewski	April 14, 2013
2	2	"Episode 2"	Cortezj5	May 19, 2013
3	3	"Episode 3"	Doomlorddradius	June 30, 2013
4	4	"Episode 4"	Luke Green	August 25, 2013

=== Season 2: Bill & Kratos' Excellent Adventure (2013–2014) ===
No. overall	No. in season	Title	Written by	Original release date
5	1	"Episode 1"	Dexter Manning	May 26, 2013
6	2	"Episode 2"	Yoon Joon So	July 21, 2013
7	3	"Episode 3"	Commander Funion	September 8, 2013
8	4	"Episode 4"	Hypotenuse	April 26, 2014
