= Birchpunk =

Russian YouTube series of the year 2098

Birchpunk is a Russian web series created by Sergey Vasiliev in 2020. It is set in Russia in the year 2098. The episodes set on Earth show how technological advancement has exacerbated Russia's social inequality, state control and neoliberal audit culture. Some episodes are set on Mars; these episodes show how Sergei, "Farmer from Ryazan county," has created a friendly collectivist farm with humanoid robots. The farm produces "fractal cukes, möbius carrots and other vegetables defiant of euclidean geometry." Nikolai keeps it operational by tinkering parts from a scrapped alien spaceship.

In 2023, Vasiliev used the characters to produce a full live action series called "Кибердеревня" (The Cybervillage), centered around the farmer trying to save his home, the last holdout on Mars against a corporation intending to build a factory.
