= Tastebuds NYC =

American culinary tourism web series

- Genre: Culinary tourism; Vlogging
- Created by: Dillon Davis ("Tall Guy"); Nichols Neff ("Hat Guy")
- Country of origin: United States
- Original language: English
- No. of seasons: 4
- No. of episodes: 47+

Production
- Running time: 3 minutes

Original release
- Network: TikTok; Instagram
- Release: November 20, 2025 – present

Tastebuds NYC is an American culinary tourism web series made for TikTok and Instagram. The show was created by Dillon Davis and Nichols Neff, respectively known as "Tall Guy" and "Hat Guy" by fans, who aim to try food from every country in the world while remaining in New York City. Using a virtual spinning wheel to pick a country for each week, Davis and Neff find a local restaurant serving that nation's cuisine and film their experiences there. The series quickly became viral and has gained a dedicated online following. It has been praised by media commentators for highlighting the multicultural diversity of New York City as well as the challenges faced by immigrants and small restaurant owners.

== Premise ==
Each Tastebuds NYC episode begins with Davis and Neff spinning a digital wheel to pick a country before finding a restaurant in New York City that serves that nation's cuisine. After arriving, they typically ask the restaurant owner to bring them the "most authentic" food from their home country before highlighting each dish and describing its flavour. Many episodes feature the duo learning how to say "thank you" in the country's native language, an idea inspired by one of their friends. They often befriend the restaurant owners, who are given the opportunity to tell their life story and share their experience in the restaurant industry. Many episodes conclude with them sharing a drink with the owner(s) or being invited to an event held at the restaurant before an ending card lists them among the duo's "new friend[s]."

At the end of each season, Davis and Neff have usually hosted meetups of the various restaurant owners facilitated through a sponsor. On the rare occasion where they cannot find a restaurant that serves a particular nation's cuisine, the duo have instead hired a private chef to cook for them.

== History ==
Before starting Tastebuds NYC, Texas native Davis worked for a consulting firm and Neff, originally from Denver, Colorado, was a technology salesman. After moving to New York City to take on work from home jobs, they met through a mutual friend and became roommates. They conceived the series' basic concept after Neff noted that most New York "foodie" content on TikTok tended to feature the same several high-end restaurants. After Davis told him about an idea he had of trying food from every country in the world, the two set out to make a TikTok series together which focused on smaller, family operated "hole-in-the-wall" restaurants.

Davis and Neff had almost no filming or editing experience, which has lent the series what Davis has called a "rough-around-the-edges" production quality. Their first video featuring an Armenian restaurant received over 100,000 likes in two days. The series' seventh episode on Bhutanese cuisine, which saw the pair bond with restaurant owner Kinley Dorji and attend his New Year's Eve party, became particularly popular on TikTok and received over five million views. As Davis and Neff have left their names off their content, fans have endearingly called them "Tall Guy" and "Hat Guy" respectively. Media commentators have highlighted the show's interpersonal warmth and its embrace of New York City as a multicultural mosaic.

== List of episodes ==
Tastebuds NYC episodes are uploaded to TikTok and Instagram every Thursday. The series is set to cover 195 countries which, with a weekly schedule, will take nearly four years to complete. As of yet, Davis and Neff have visited restaurants in every borough of New York City except for Staten Island.

=== Season 1 (November 2025 – February 2026) ===
Countries represented in Tastebuds NYC by the end of season 1

The first season of Tastebuds NYC consists of 12 episodes. For the season one finale, the Brooklyn Nets invited Davis, Neff, and the restauranteurs they had met so far to a private suite at Barclays Center for their game against the Chicago Bulls.

No.	Release date	Country	Restaurant	Location	Guest(s)
1	November 20, 2025	Armenia	Little Armenia Cafe	Greenpoint, Brooklyn	Ararat
2	November 26, 2025	Hungary	Budapest Cafe	Upper East Side, Manhattan	Eric
3	December 3, 2025	Philippines	Ihawan	Little Manila, Woodside, Queens	Oliver
4	December 10, 2025	Venezuela	Arepas Cafe	Astoria, Queens	Riccardo
5	December 17, 2025	South Korea	Ssam Tong BBQ	Flushing, Queens	Sung-Wong; Victor
6	December 24, 2025	Albania	Çka Ka Qëllue	Kips Bay, Manhattan	Sylvia
7	January 1, 2026	Bhutan	The Weekender	Woodside, Queens	Kinley
8	January 8, 2026	Tajikistan	Karavan Kebab	Homecrest, Brooklyn	Behruz
9	January 15, 2026	Paraguay	I Love Paraguay Restaurant	Sunnyside, Queens	Elizabeth
10	January 22, 2026	Morocco	Dar Lbahja	Astoria, Queens	Maryam
11	January 29, 2026	Indonesia	Awang Kitchen	Elmhurst, Queens	Awang
12	February 5, 2026	Somalia	Safari	Harlem, Manhattan	Shakib
–	February 12, 2026	Season finale sponsored by the Brooklyn Nets.			

=== Season 2 (February–June 2026) ===
Countries represented in Tastebuds NYC by the end of season 2

The second season of Tastebuds NYC consists of 16 episodes. For the season two finale, DoorDash invited Davis, Neff, and many of the restauranteurs they had met so far to Semma, a Michelin Star Indian restaurant in Greenwich Village, Manhattan.

No.	Release date	Country	Restaurant(s)	Location	Guest(s)
13	February 19, 2026	Afghanistan	Ariana Afghan Kebab	Hell's Kitchen, Manhattan	Wali
14	February 26, 2026	Brazil	Beija Flor	Long Island City, Queens	Gabriel
15	March 5, 2026	Syria	Laila Bayridge	Bay Ridge, Brooklyn	David
16	March 12, 2026	Haiti	Martine's Bistro	Flatlands, Brooklyn	Martine
17	March 19, 2026	Czech Republic	Bohemian Spirit	Upper East Side, Manhattan	Kateřina
18	March 26, 2026	Antigua and Barbuda	Wadadli	Bedford–Stuyvesant, Brooklyn	Brods
19	April 2, 2026	Honduras	Seis Vecinos	South Bronx	Omar
20	April 9, 2026	Taiwan	A-Pou's Taste	East Williamsburg, Brooklyn	Doris
21	April 16, 2026	Yemen	Yemenat	Bay Ridge, Brooklyn	Mohannad
22	April 23, 2026	Malaysia	Wok Wok Noodle House	Chinatown, Manhattan	Erik
23	April 30, 2026	Mongolia	Mongolian Momo King	Midtown Manhattan	Khurelbaatar "Kai"
24	May 7, 2026	Serbia	Kafana	Alphabet City, Manhattan	Srdjan
25	May 14, 2026	Canada	The Canuck; Tim Hortons	Chelsea, Manhattan	—N/a
26	May 21, 2026	Guyana	Sybil's Bakery	Jamaica, Queens	Ken
27	May 28, 2026	Russia	Stolovaya	Sheepshead Bay, Brooklyn	Egor
28	June 4, 2026	Algeria	The Kasbah Café	Sunnyside, Queens	Amina; Halim
–	June 11, 2026	Season finale sponsored by DoorDash.			

=== Season 3 (June–October 2026) ===
Countries represented in Tastebuds NYC by the end of season 3

The third season of Tastebuds NYC consists of 17 episodes. The show went on a brief hiatus in October–November 2026 as Davis and Neff went to Bhutan to visit their friend Kinley (who they had met in the first season) and attend his sister's wedding.

No.	Release date	Country	Restaurant(s)	Location	Guest(s)
29	June 18, 2026	Colombia	Sabor de Colombia	Bay Ridge, Brooklyn	Sandra
30	June 25, 2026	Bangladesh	Tong NYC; Puran Dhaka	Jackson Heights, Queens	Naeem; Amin
31	July 2, 2026	Ghana	Adom African Cuisine	East Tremont, Bronx	Patricia
32	July 9, 2026	Norway	Kabin	Hudson Square, Manhattan	Jordan
33	July 16, 2026	Eritrea	Makina Eritrean	Sunnyside, Queens	Eden
34	July 23, 2026	Cyprus	Aliada	Astoria, Queens	Louis
35	July 30, 2026	Cameroon	(None; private chef)		Raïssa
36	August 6, 2026	Moldova	Ador Restaurant	Brighton Beach, Brooklyn	Săndel
37	August 13, 2026	Ecuador	Dinastia	Williamsburg, Brooklyn	Miriam
38	August 20, 2026	France	Tournesol	Long Island City, Queens	Patricia
39	August 27, 2026	Myanmar	Burmese Bites	Astoria, Queens	Myo
40	September 3, 2026	Burkina Faso	Azara Kitchen	Harlem, Manhattan	Ousmane
41	September 10, 2026	Bosnia and Herzegovina	Sarajevo Grill	Astoria, Queens	Elvira
42	September 17, 2026	Zimbabwe	(None; private chef)		Zi
43	September 24, 2026	Sweden	Björk Cafe & Bistro	Murray Hill, Manhattan	Ulrika
44	October 1, 2026	Suriname	PNK Surinamese Cuisine	South Richmond Hill, Queens	Neil
45	October 8, 2026	Kazakhstan	Farida	Financial District, Manhattan	Farida

=== Season 4 (November 2026 – present) ===
Countries represented in Tastebuds NYC to date

No.	Release date	Country	Restaurant	Location	Guest
46	November 12, 2026	Egypt	Mombar	Astoria, Queens	Mustafa
47	November 19, 2026	Ethiopia	Bersi Ethiopian Restaurant	Greenpoint, Brooklyn	Bersi
