= Hero Envy =

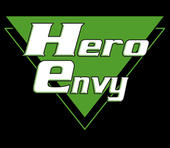
- Series logo
- Created by: Mike Hopta; Keith Gleason
- Starring: John Cimino; Keith Gleason; Efrain Martinez
- Country of origin: United States
- Original language: English
- No. of episodes: 30

Production
- Producers: Keith Gleason; John Cimino
- Production location: Massachusetts
- Running time: 12 - 35 minutes.

Original release
- Release: August 21, 2005

Hero Envy and its spinoff Hero Envy: The Swass Adventures are two American web-based comedy series, initially produced exclusively for Internet distribution. The former was the sole venture of the production company Glint of Hope Productions. That series ran for 24 episodes and three "Christmas Annuals". After a hiatus in fall 2008, the spin-off show was produced by Reckless Sidekick Productions. The Hero Envy franchise has been described as "nerd parody."

Hero Envy began as the script for an uncompleted short film written by Mike Hopta and Keith Gleason in 1997. The comedy featured 2 friends named J.D. and Wally who were on a quest to find meaning in their lives after they graduate from college. In 2005, Hopta and Gleason revamped the idea and wrote four scripts they produced as 10- to 35-minute live-action web videos. Glint of Hope Productions was formed and premiered the pilot episode "Saturday Morning" in August 2005. Episodes revolved around the misadventures of J.D. and Wally. Supporting characters were Orson the science-fiction loving pacifist and Dekker the crazy horror fan.

Guest stars included professional wrestler the Smoke, Fat Momma from Who Wants to be a Superhero?, musician Phil Labonte, and Kina Dean from the reality show Road Rules.

In May 2009 Glint of Hope Productions halted production and dissolved. That September, a new production company, Reckless Sidekick Productions formed, and began filming a new spin-off series, "Hero Envy: The Swass Adventures."

Hero Envy: The Swass Adventures is a spin-off series that ran in 2009. It premiered six months after the last episode of "Hero Envy" and focused on the continuing adventures of Dekker in an alternate universe where he now lives with J.D. and a new character known only as the Toy Dealer. The storylines deal with Dekker's quest to get back to his home world and his attempt to deal with his current reality. The final episode, "Christmas Special 2009", was released in December 2009.

In 2009, Reckless Sidekick Productions began publishing an ongoing video podcast series starring Gleason and Cimino in, generally, a roundtable discussion with guests covering a specific pop-culture topic each installment. The podcasts 15 to 30 minutes.

== Comic book ==
In April 2012, Reckless Sidekick Productions released the "Hero Envy" comic book. Written by Keith Gleason with added dialogue from Efrain Martinez and story assistance from John Cimino, the comic book is a three-part miniseries set in the universe established in the "Hero Envy" webisodes. A trade paperback compilation was released in April 2013. The story expands on the characters' backgrounds and follows them on a quest for four mystical objects that need to be used against villain El Moco-Conpan. The comic also adds an otherworldly character U-Toob, a parody of Marvel Comics' Uatu the Watcher. who guides the characters throughout the story. The comic includes a second story that explains the origin of El Diablo, an imaginary friend who lives in the character J.D.'s head.

== Characters ==
J.D. Fields - Played by John Cimino

The rambunctious and raging hormone who sometimes doesn't know if he's 3 or 30 (and this usually happens at the expense of others)! Cares little for time, law and order, for those things mean nothing in "J.D. World." Even though he's loath to admit it, J.D. needs his best friend Wally and this sometimes comes at a huge price. An incorrigible rebel that lives for babes, beers, cartoons, and chaos, and not necessarily in that order. In an alternate dimension J.D. lives with The Toy Dealer and seems to tolerate Dekker a little more than usual (even asking him to become a roommate). He likes to change his hats depending on the situations.

Dekker - Played by Keith Gleason

Works the counter for the local comic shop "Fly on the Wall Comics." Dekker has been friends with Wally for over 10 years and they bonded over an issue of Hellboy. A loner who is a little "off" due to his militant love for blood, guts, and horror. Dekker is also up on all internet geek news because he is on eBay everyday and writing hate e-mails to studios for re-making his favorite horror movies. Recently, Dekker stole J.B.'s reality hopping razor for fun but now finds himself trapped in a parallel universe that he is trying to escape from.

Wallace North - Played by Mike Hopta

The level-headed, kind, yet sometimes gullible guy who looks for the best in everyone and in any situation. Think Charlie Brown trying to "right the wrong" like his hero Hal Jordan (Green Lantern) while maintaining his sanity in a world lost. Wally tries to live as normal of a life as possible by balancing a riled up J.D. and trying to "get it right" with his on and off again girlfriend Brooke. Known for his high-speed-joystick-trigger-fingers and an almost uncanny dedication to his comicbook heroes.

Orson H. Cochrane - Played by Kurt Loether

The lovable, somewhat-robotic science fiction companion to Wally. Orson still lives at home with his mother (but he would contend it's the bridge of the USS Enterprise). Wally and Orson met in line waiting for "Return of the Jedi" tickets 20 years ago (oddly enough he still hasn't stopped complaining about the Ewoks). His extensive robotic Sci-fi techno babble can drive even the most balanced Jedi to the dark side. Orson's relationship with J.D. is a bit shakey because J.D. is very territorial when it comes to all things Wally.
