= Tales of Zale =

Independent animated series

Tales of Zale is an independent animated fantasy series created by Danish animator Sif Perlt Savery.

== Development ==
Originally released as an online pilot in February 2012, Episode 1 coming out in January 2015, with a similar story to the pilot.

Episode 2 released April 2016, as a continuation from Episode 1. The story continued further with Tales of Zale - Flickering lights, released as a separate short animated film in September 2022.

As of early 2026, a Crowdfunding campaign for Tales of Zale ran from the 24th of February to the 31st of March to assist funding animation of a pilot for a reboot of the series.

=== Awards and Showcasing ===
Tales of Zale - Flickering lights won Best Children's Film at the 2022 Frederikstad Animation Showcase (FAD), before also featuring in the Viborg Animation Festival. It was also nominated for an Ursa Major on Flayrah in 2022 under the category "Best Dramatic Short Works".
