= Average Betty =

Culinary web series

Average Betty is a short-format, food entertainment web series written, produced, and performed by Sara O'Donnell. The web series debuted on iTunes in August 2006 as an innovative blend of cooking and campy comedy sketches. The unique format caused some people to question if Average Betty was even a cooking show at all. The show attracted millions of viewers and it received accolades from both new and traditional media, including Fox News, Yahoo!, and the food editors at the Los Angeles Times and The Tampa Tribune.

The Food Editor at The Tampa Tribune, published a full-page article featuring sixteen color photos, "Bye-Bye, Betty Crocker Hello Average Betty," in the Flavor Section. A preview of the article, "Betty Has A Recipe For Web Success", made the front page of The Tampa Tribune. In October 2007 Average Betty made the Los Angeles KTTV-Fox 11 10 o’clock news in a story called Average Betty Heating up the Internet! In November 2007, Average Betty again made the Fox 10 o’clock news, this time in her hometown of Tampa Bay, Florida. In December, 2007, iTunes named Average Betty a "Best of 2007 Podcast".

The show has evolved beyond its campy comedy sketch origins. It now includes creative recipes, cooking demonstrations, and interviews with celebrity chefs, such as Michael Chiarello, Ming Tsai, and Stephanie Izard. Adam Gropman, of LA Weekly, describes O'Donnell as "an Internet phenomenon, a self-created culinary personality finding an audience without the benefit of a book deal, magazines or a TV show."

In 2011, O'Donnell became one of 16 YouTube cooking channels selected for the first class of YouTube Next Chefs, which included $10,000 of grant money, $5,000 of equipment, and expert tutoring from Google/YouTube. The program is intended to focus attention on up-and-coming food vloggers. AverageBetty's web traffic increased significantly as a result, averaging 75,000 to 100,000 monthly views on YouTube.

== Awards and accolades ==
- Best Internet Personality, 2007, Yahoo! Video Awards
- Best Home Chef in a Series, 2010, Taste Awards
- Best Critic or Review Series (on TV or Web), 2012, Taste Awards
