= The Mimi & Flo Show =

American comedy webseries

The Mimi & Flo Show is the web's first Choose Your Own Adventure-style comedy web series. It has been active since February 20, 2007. The story is about 2 girls from the midwest struggling in New York City and trying to become successful. Their made-for-YouTube video SAME DUDE is a musical-parody of R. Kelly and Usher's "Same Girl".

The show is written and created by Hannah Bos, Frances Chewning, and Jeff Maksym. It stars Frances Chewning as Mimi, and Hannah Bos as Flo. The direction and cinematography is by Jeff Maksym. One episode of the series features a guest appearance by former Howard Stern sidekick, Jackie Martling.

The design of the site employs Flash programming.

The Mimi & Flo Show has been featured by ZOOZOOM, Yahoo's "The 9", USA Today's "Pop Candy", Starred Review, A Socialite's Life, Stereogum, and allhiphop.com.
