= Pillow Talks =

Comedy web series

Pillow Talks is a comedy web series about bedroom conversations, created in January 2009 by Boris Wexler. The first webisode was posted January 8, 2009. It is released on the series' website. The show follows a number of couples, with every scene taking place in the bedroom, usually at night time.

Pillow Talks is written by a team of writers that include Wexler, Paul Peditto, and Elaine Tuman, and produced and directed by Boris Wexler.

== Description ==
Pillow Talks features several recurrent characters over episodes that range from three to five minutes. The initial characters include Rex and Rochelle, a porn star and her producer husband, an overweight gay couple, Trevor and Tucker, and Sunil, an aspiring Indian filmmaker infatuated with Aishwarya Rai. Most episodes center around a specific topic, either cultural or social, although some develop a more continuous storyline over several segments. Most actors come from the Chicago theater community.

The Pillow Talks website features a forum and several social media sharing tools aimed at developing a community around the series, allowing the users to submit episodes ideas and feedback.

The webisodes are available in English, with optional French subtitles.

== Production ==
The first 13 episodes were filmed over two days at the director's house in November 2008, on a $3,000 budget, using a Panasonic HVX200. 29 more were produced in March 2009, and were scheduled to be released starting May 2009.
