= Catalyst Story Institute & Content Festival =

US arts organization and festival

Catalyst Content Festival
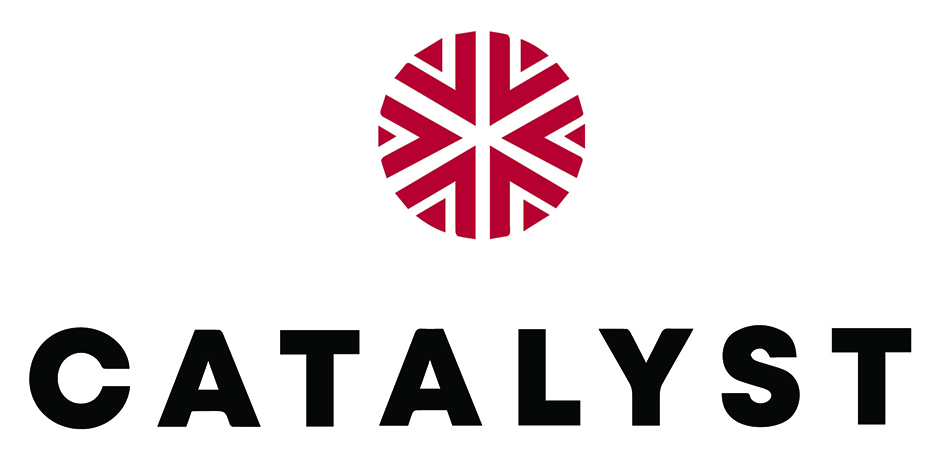
- Location: Duluth, Minnesota United States
- Founded: 2006
- Founded by: AJ Tesler
- Hosted by: Philip Gilpin, Jr.
- Language: English
- Website: Catalyst Story Institute & Content Festival

Catalyst Story Institute & Content Festival, formerly the ITVFest (The Independent Television Festival), is an arts organization and an annual festival gathering of fans, artists and executives from around the world to celebrate outstanding independent narrative production.

The festival gives independent television and narrative artists the opportunity to share their work with television professionals and a larger community of independent TV producers.

Catalyst Story Institute & Content Festival is the only independent television festival in the United States. ITVFest is the first festival dedicated to independently produced pilots and webseries, with an emphasis on new media.

Festival support has come from companies and media outlets including Sony, The TV Academy (the Emmys), Fox TV Studios, RDF, Comedy Central, SyFy, FX (TV channel), GSN, HBO, Current TV, The Hollywood Reporter, Tubefilter, Stickam, B-Side and Comcast.

== History ==
Catalyst Story Institute & Content Festival was founded as The Independent Television Festival in 2006 by producer AJ Tesler, and was originally held in Los Angeles, California.

In 2013, Philip Gilpin, Jr. took over as the festival's Executive Director. ITVFest moved from Los Angeles to Vermont to find a rural setting where industry leaders and creators could escape the big city to build relationships with the goal of creating an industry pipeline for independent television creators to have direct access to industry decision makers. In 2015, on attending ITVFest IndieWire called independent television is "a real, new part of the industry that deserves attention."

In 2017, ITVFest partnered with HBO in a deal that awarded festival winners meetings with top executives. Bob Bakish, CEO of Viacom, keynoted at ITVFest 2017. In 2018, Adaptive Studios bought the rights to Astral, a television drama set to include actors Ben Affleck and Matt Damon, from a creator met at ITV Festival. Powderkeg's Laura Fischer and Gary Dourdan were among the judges at ITVFest in 2018. After ITVFest 2018, Vermont officials dropped their support for television and film in the state.

In 2019, ITVFest moved to Duluth, Minnesota, attracting thousands of attendees. Also in 2019, ITVFest contracted a multiyear sponsorship with Abrams Artists Agency, marking the first direct connection between a TV festival and an agency, while simultaneously rebranding to Catalyst Story Investitute & Content Festival.

== Previous winners ==
2024 winners

- PitchWorld Champions (Best Series Pitch): Secondchance Maggie - Rebecca Knowles; Branson - Erin Bradford

- Best Student Script: Monday School
- Best Drama Script: Rebeccas - Megen Musegades
- Best Comedy Script: Tamarack - Elle Thoni
- Best Sci-fi and Fantasy Script: Nightfall - David Guthrie
- Best Kids and Animation Script: Bright Blue - Mary McGloin
- Best Thriller/Horror Script: Shuttlecock - Tapan Sharma; Magnolia Hill - Terra Wellington

- Best Animation Pilot: Chorus to Dero - Dana Corrigan, Joseph Solinsky
- Best Comedy Pilot: The Countdown - Melanie Renfroe, Shannon McLemore, Heidi-Marie Ferren, Yorke Fryer, James Renfroe, Kelly Roberts, Noah Hougland, Peter Beirne, David Gielan
- Best Documentary Pilot: Woman at the End of the World - Martyna Wojciechowska, Hanna Jewsiewicka, Ewa Marcinowska, Jowita Baraniecka-Ogden
- Best Drama Pilot: Madam - Tom Hern, Halaifonua Finau, Marci Wiseman, Nick Spicer, Aram Tertzakian, Belindalee Hope, Kacie Anning, Madeleine Sami, Peter Salmon, Shoshana McCallum, and Harry McNaughton
- Best Reality Pilot: Affiliated - Truman Kewley, Terry 'Carver Tee' Williams, Deawnne Buckmire
- Best Sci-Fi and Fantasy Pilot: Two Breaths - Kateryna Kurganska, Timur Guseynov, Don John, c Craig
- Best Short Form and Experimental Pilot: My Dearest Elizabeth - MaryLynn Suchan, Poonam Basu
- Best Sports Pilot: Mary Queen of Van Life - Jasia Ka
- Best Podcast: abandoned: The All-American Ruins Podcast

- Best of Fest: Madam - Tom Hern, Halaifonua Finau, Marci Wiseman, Nick Spicer, Aram Tertzakian, Belindalee Hope, Kacie Anning, Madeleine Sami, Peter Salmon, Shoshana McCallum, and Harry McNaughton

2019 winners

- Best Breakout Creators - Sam and Colby
- Best Breakout Series - "Challenge Accepted"
- Best Script Pitch - "Georgi & the Bot"
- Best Documentary - "Beneath the Ink"
- Best Reality Series - "Run"
- Best Animation - "Starship Goldfish"
- Best Short Film - "Lose It"
- Best Short Comedy Series - "Doxxed"
- Best Short Drama Series - "Dad Man Walking"
- Best Comedy Series - "This Isn't Me"
- Best Drama Series - "Home Turf"
- Best Comedy Script - Wendy Braff, "Mr. Trivia"
- Best Drama Script - Justin Moran, "Rust"
- Best Cinematography - Ryan Z. Emanuel, "Chosen"
- Best Writing - Brandon Garegnani, "Scribbles"
- Best Directing - Mara Joly, "Home Turf"
- Best Editing - Oliver Parker, "The System"
- Best Comedy Actor - Ben Kawaller, "This Isn't Me"
- Best Comedy Actress - Ani Tatintsyan, "Pre-Mortem"
- Best Drama Actor - Akintola Jiboyewa, "The System"
- Best Drama Actress - Alison Jaye, "Chosen"
- Best of Festival - "Work/Friends"

2019 Documentary Official Selection

- Beneath the Ink
- Caminantes (Walkers)
- Jeffrey T. Larson
- Magnolia's Hope
- Outsourced: The New Wisconsin Idea

2018 winners

- Best Podcast - Yarn Story Podcast
- Best Drama Script - Near Death, Owen Hornstein III, Andrew Bryan, And James Roe
- Best Comedy Script - Not Liz, Liz Murpy
- Best Documentary - Jacks & Jills
- Best Short Film - Monday
- Best Cinematography - Adrian Correia, Avenues
- Best Reality - Charlie Bee Company
- Best Writing - Stephen Ohl, White River Tales
- Best Editing - Darian Dauchan, The New Adventures of Brobot Johnson
- Best Drama Actor - Kolman Domingo, Nothingham
- Best Drama Actress - Vongai Shava, Patiri in the Promise Land
- Best Comedy Actor - Tomy Kang, Taking a Hit
- Best Comedy Actress - Caroline Parsons, The Russian Cousin
- Best Directing - Yair Valer, Wild Weeds
- Web Short Comedy Series - Susaneland
- Best Short Drama Series - Revenge Tour
- Best Drama Series - Currency
- Best Comedy Series - Filth City
- Best of ITVFest - 88

2016 winners

- Best TV Short Drama - People Like Us

2015 winners

- Best Visual Effects - Border Queen
- Best Reality - Kickin' it Caucasian
- Best Short Film - February
- Best Writing - The Wake
- Best Cinematography - Zero Point
- Best Acting Ensemble - Fu@K I Love U
- Best Actor - Darrell Lake, The Incredible Life of Darrell
- Best Actress - Alex Trow, Cooking for One
- Best Director - Kerry Valderrama, Sanitarium
- Best Documentary - Port of Indecision
- Web Web Series Comedy - The KATEering SHow
- Best Web Series Drama - Farr
- Best TV Drama - Trouble
- Best TV Comedy - Life Sucks
- Best of ITVFest - The Wake

2013 winners

- Best in Show - Old Souls
- Best Acting - Mythos
- Best Comedy - Preggers
- Best Drama - Event Zero
- Best Documentary - Comrade Sunshine

2012 winners

- Best Writer - Underwater, Nathan Marshall & Michael Traynor
- Best Actress in a Drama - Underwater, Rachel Nichols

2010 winners

- "Innovator" Award - Illeana Douglas
- Best Overall Web - Octane Pistols of Fury, Chris Prine, Greg Stees
- Best Overall TV - Going to Pot, Leo Simone, Scott Perlman, Jamie Kennedy
- Best Documentary - Going to Pot, Leo Simone, Scott Perlman, Jamie Kennedy
- Best Animated Pilot- Time Traveling Finger, Stephen Leonard
- Best Drama - the_source, Marc D’Agostino
- Best Comedy- Octane Pistols of Fury, Chris Prine, Greg Stees
- Mobifest Winner - Phobias, Kasi Brown and Brandon Walter
- Best Actor - La Manzana, Paula Roman
- Best Director - 15 Minutes, Bobby Salomon
- Best Writer - Odd Jobs, Jeremy Redleaf
- Best Cinematographer - Goodsam & Max, Gil Nievo

2009 winners

- "I Am Independent" Award - Kevin Pollak
- Best Overall Web - OzGirl, Nicholas Carlton, Sophie Tilson
- Best Overall TV - Dog, Barry Gribble
- Best Documentary - Pushing The Limits, Javier Bermudez
- Best Animated Pilot- Wentworth & Buxbury, Lucas Crandles, Timothy Nash and Hayden Grubb
- Best Drama - Urban Wolf, Napoleon Premiere, Laurent Touil-Tartour
- Best Comedy- MERRIme.com, Kaily Smith
- Mobifest Winner - Chelsey & Kelsey, Claire Coffee, Ellie Knaus, Marie-Amelie Rechberg
- Best Actor - OzGirl, Shanrah Wakefield, Sophie Tilson
- Best Director - Dark Room Theater, Benjamin Pollack
- Best Writer - Imaginary Bitches, Andrew Miller
- Best Cinematographer - Goodsam & Max, Gil Nievo

2008 winners

- Best Dramatic Program - Turnover, Michael Blieden
- Best Comedic Program - Small Bits of Happiness, Blake Barrie and Thiago Gadelha
- Best Documentary Program - Wal-Mart Nation - Andrew Munger
- Best Alternative Program - Welcome to Plainville - Jason Frederick, Anne Gregory, Kevin McShane, Opus Moreschi, Charlotte Newhouse
- Best Webseries - Violent Jake, Samuel Smith, Clint Gossett and Tansy Brook
- Audience Award - Small Town News - Sarah Babineau
- Best Director - Turnover, Michael Blieden
- Best Writer - Hit Factor, James Cromwell, Saba Homayoon, Neil Hopkins, Jamie Rosenblatt, Kerry Sullivan
- Best Ensemble Acting - Hit Factor, James Cromwell, Saba Homayoon, Neil Hopkins, Jamie Rosenblatt, Kerry Sullivan

2007 Winners

- Best Dramatic Program - The Collectors, Steve Alper
- Best Comedic Program - Partners - Seth Menachem, Avi Rothman
- Best Documentary Program - Gusto - Mike Maniglia, Subterra Films
- Best Alternative Program - King Kaiser - Steven Burrows, The Burrows of Hollywood
- Best Webseries - Trekant, Diaperdog Productions
- Audience Award - King Kaiser - Steven Burrows, The Burrows of Hollywood
- Webseries Audience Award - Flipper Nation, Space Shank Media
- Vuze Second Chance Competition - Adam Ray TV, Adam Ray
- Best Director - Mr. Jackson's Neighborhood, Nathan Marshall
- Best Writer - Deal With It, Steven Muterspaugh, Michael Kary, Jamey Hood and Karin Kary
- Best Ensemble Acting - Grounds Zero, Alan Keller

2006 Winners

- Best Dramatic Program - "FBI Guys" - Paul Darrigo, 2 Wolves Production
- Best Comedic Program - "As Seen on TV" - Ryan Sage
- Best Variety Program - "Loading Zone" - Nick Barnes, Frog Island Films
- Best Reality Program - "Meet Tom Kramer" - Rachael Pihlaja
- Audience Award - "This is My Friend" - Jeremy Konner, Morning Knight Films
- Best Director - "The Perverts" - John Gegenhuber, The Perverts Pictures
- Best Writer - "As Seen on TV" - Ryan Sage
- Best Ensemble Acting - "Van Stone: Tour of Duty" - Tim Bennett, Dakota

== See also ==
- List of television festivals
