= List of adult animated web series =

This is a list of adult animated web series. Works in this medium could be considered adult for any number of reasons, which include the incorporation of explicit or suggestive sexual content, graphic violence, profane language, dark humour, or other thematic elements inappropriate for children. Works in this genre may explore philosophical, political, or social issues. Some productions are noted for their complex and/or experimental storytelling and animation techniques. Adult animation is typically defined as animation which skews toward adults. It is also described as something that "formative youths should stay far, far away from" or has adult humor and comes in various styles, but especially sitcoms and comedies. These animations can also "appeal to wide swaths of viewers," including those aged 18–34. Adweek called adult animation "animated projects aimed at grown-ups, not kids."

This list does not include Japanese, Chinese, or Korean series, as it is much more common in these regions. It also does not include animated films or television series, including those on streaming video on demand platforms such as Netflix, Hulu, Amazon Prime Video, Max, Peacock, Disney+, Apple TV+, and Paramount+. (Note: Other streaming platforms include YouTube Premium (formerly known as YouTube Red), Google TV, YouTube TV, Facebook Watch, CW Seed, VRV, Crunchyroll, and Crave, among others. Shows on sites on Newgrounds or on general YouTube channels are not streaming platforms, so they cannot be considered streaming TV.)

== 1990s ==
Title	Seasons/episodes	Show creator(s)	Year	Original channel	Studio	Source
The Goddamn George Liquor Program	1 season, 8 episodes	John Kricfalusi	1997–1998	spumco.com	Spümcø	
Joe Cartoon	1 season, 5 episodes	Joseph C. Shields	1998			
The God & Devil Show	1 season, 43 episodes	Aubrey Ankrum	1999–2001	Mondo Media	Mondo Media	
Like News	1 season, 80 episodes	Don Asmussen	1999–2001	Mondo Media	Mondo Media	
Princess	1 season, 3 episodes	Trey Parker, Matt Stone	1999			
Starship Regulars	1 season, 10 episodes	Rob LaZebnik	1999	icebox.com	Icebox	
Thugs on Film	1 season, 106 episodes	Dan Todd	1999–2001	Mondo Media	Mondo Media	
Weekend Pussy Hunt	1 season, 12 episodes	John Kricfalusi	1999	icebox.com	Spümcø	

== 2000s ==
Title	Seasons/episodes	Show Creator	Year	Original channel	Studio	Source
Absolute Zero	2 season, 32 episodes	Anne Beatts; Greg Beato; Sandy Smallens	2000–2001	Mondo Media	Mondo Media	
Happy Tree Friends	6 seasons, 94 episodes	Aubrey Ankrum, Rhode Montijo, Kenn Navarro	2000–present	Mondo Media, YouTube	Mondo Media	
Hard Drinkin' Lincoln	1 season, 16 episodes	Mike Reiss	2000–2002	icebox.com	Icebox	
Lobo	1 season, 14 episodes	Boyd Kirkland	2000	warnerbros.com	Noodle Soup Productions, Warner Bros. Animation	
Mr. Wong	1 season, 13 episodes	Pam Brady, Kyle McCulloch	2000	icebox.com	Icebox; Mondo Mini Shows; National Lampoon	
Queer Duck	1 season, 20 episodes	Mike Reiss	2000–2002	icebox.com sho.com	Icebox	
The Rotten Fruit	1 season, 8 episodes	Eli Roth, Noah Belson	2000	Z.com		
This Modern World	37 episodes	Tom Tomorrow	2000–2001	Mondo Media	Flickerlab	
Zombie College	1 season, 13 episodes	Eric Kapen	2000–2001	icebox.com	Icebox	
The Adventures of Edward the Less	1 season, 13 episodes	Mike Dodge	2001	Scifi.com		
Inspector Beaver	1 season, 2 episodes	David Feiss	2001	Mondo Media	Mondo Media	
Masyanya	1 season, 130+ episodes	Oleg Kuvaev	2001–present	NTV	Mult.ru	
Sweet J Presents	1 season, 12 episodes	Seth Green, Matthew Senreich	2001	ScreenBlast.com	Sony	
Xiao Xiao	1 season, 10 episodes	Zhu Zhiqiang	2001–2002	Newgrounds	XiaoXiao Movie.com	
DumbLand	1 season, 8 episodes	David Lynch	2002			
Huevocartoon		Gabriel and Rodolfo Riva Palacio Alatriste, Carlos Zepeda Chehaibar, Rodolfo Riva Palacio Velasco	2002–present	YouTube	Huevocartoon Producciones	
Red vs. Blue	18 seasons, 330 episodes	Burnie Burns	2003–present	Rooster Teeth	Rooster Teeth Productions	
Waterman§	1 season, 9 episodes	Bryan Waterman	2003–2009	Newgrounds	Waterman Studios	
Eddsworld	3 seasons, 39 episodes	Edd Gould	2004–2016, 2020–present	YouTube, Newgrounds	Eddsworld; TurboPunch Ltd.	
Mundo Canibal	1 season, 200 episodes	Ricardo Piologo, Rodrigo Piologo	2004–2014	mundocanibal.com, YouTube	Irmãos Piologo Produções	
Salad Fingers	1 season, 14 episodes	David Firth, Christian Webb	2004–present	YouTube, Newgrounds		
How It Should Have Ended	14 seasons, 186 episodes	Daniel Baxter, Tommy Watson, Christina "Tina" Alexander	2005–present	YouTube	HowItShouldHaveEnded.com	
House of Cosbys	1 season, 4 episodes	Justin Roiland	2005	Channel 101		
The Adventures of Baxter and McGuire	1 season, 8 episodes	Michael J. Weithorn and Nick Bakay	2006	Comedy Central		
Golden Age	1 season, 10 episodes		2006	Comedy Central		
Lizzy the Lezzy		Ruth Selwyn	2006			
Pib and Pog	1 season, 5 episodes	Peter Peake	2006	Atom.com	Aardman Animations	
Afterworld	1 season, 13 episodes	Brent V. Friedman & Michael DeCourcey	2007–2008	YouTube bud.tv		
Angry Kid	4 seasons, 70 episodes	Darren Walsh	2007–2019	Atom.com; YouTube	Aardman Animations; Mr Morris Productions	
Planet Unicorn	1 season, 6 episodes	Mike Rose, Tyler Spiers	2007	Channel 101	Channel 101	
Revisioned: Tomb Raider	1 season, 10 episodes	Ricardo Sanchez	2007	GameTap		
Bloody Bunny	4 seasons, 51 episodes	2spotstudio	2008–2016	YouTube	2spotstudio kachdoki Studio; Avex Management; Riff Animation	
Seth MacFarlane's Cavalcade of Cartoon Comedy	1 season, 50 episodes	Seth MacFarlane	2008–2009	YouTube	Fuzzy Door Productions; Main Street Pictures; Media Rights Capital; Fox Television Animation (uncredited)	
Ahmed and Salim	1 season, 17 episodes	Or Paz, Tom Trager	2009–2011	YouTube		
G.I. Joe: Resolute	1 season, 11 episodes	Warren Ellis	2009	Adult Swim Video	Titmouse, Inc.	
Llamas with Hats	1 season, 13 episodes	Jason Steele	2009–2024		FilmCow	
Marvel Superheroes: What the--?!	119 episodes		2009	YouTube	Marvel Entertainment	
Mort's End	3 seasons, 30 episodes	Alex Valkema	2009–2010	Blip.tv		
Mr. Freeman	2 seasons, 35 episodes		2009–2019	YouTube	Toonbox	
Terminator Salvation: The Machinima Series	1 season, 6 episodes		2009	Machinima	Warner Premiere Digital; Wonderland Sound and Vision; The Halcyon Company; Machinima, Inc.	

== 2010s ==
Title	Seasons/Episodes	Show creator(s)	Year	Original channel	Studio	Source
Dick Figures	5 seasons, 54 episodes	Ed Skudder; Zack Keller	2010–2015	YouTube	Mondo Media; 6 Point Harness; Remochoso	
Don't Hug Me I'm Scared			2011-2016	Youtube		
Death Battle	12 seasons, 197 episodes	Ben Singer; Chad James	2010–present	YouTube; ScrewAttack	ScrewAttack; Rooster Teeth	
Dan the Man	1 season, 22 episodes		2010–2024	YouTube	Studio JOHO	
The Crack!	2 season, 20 episodes	Jason Sargeant; Christine Aktin; Dan Lloyd	2011–present	YouTube	Element Animation	
Masameer	8 seasons, 107 episodes	Malik Nejer	2011–2019	YouTube	Myrkott Animation Studio	
PONY.MOV	1 season, 6 episodes	Max Gilardi	2011–2013	YouTube		
Shaaark!	1 season, 7 episodes	Phil watson	2011	YouTube		
The Shtreimels	1 season, 2 episodes	Or Paz; Tom Trager	2011	YouTube	Sugar Zaza	
Bravest Warriors	4 seasons, 82 episodes	Pendleton Ward	2012–2018	YouTube, VRV	Frederator Studios; Cartoon Hangover; Nelvana	
The Big Lez Show	4 seasons, 36 episodes	Jarrad Wright, Tom Hollis	2012–2019	YouTube, Comedy Central Australia		
Deep Space 69	4 seasons, 40 episodes	Daniel Katz	2012–2018	YouTube	Mondo Media; Slothvision; 6 Point Harness; OddBot Animation; Yeti Farm Creative	
Electric City	1 season, 20 episodes	Tom Hanks	2012	Yahoo! Screen	Reliance Entertainment; Playtone; 6 Point Harness	
Goodwin vs. Badwin	1 season, 8 episodes	Joshua Bowen; Peter Burton	2012	YouTube	Mondo Media	
Hellbenders	1 season, 4 episodes	Zach Hadel; Chris O'Neil	2012–present	YouTube, Newgrounds		
Krogzilla	1 season, 10 episodes	Cory Edwards	2012	Shut Up! Cartoons	Silly Master Media; Green Shoe Animation	
Invageddom	1 season, 6 episodes	Frazanimation	2012–2013	YouTube		
Lloyd the Rock'n Unicorn	1 seasons, 13 episodes	Colin Fleming	2012–2014	YouTube	Toonocracy	
The Most Popular Girls in School	5 seasons, 82 episodes	Mark Cope; Carlo Moss	2012–2017	YouTube	Extra Credit Studios; Universal Cable Productions (season 5)	
Porkchop 'n Flatscreen	1 seasons, 40 episodes	Emezie Okorafor	2012–present	YouTube		
SuperFuckers	1 season, 12 episodes	James Kochalka	2012–2013	YouTube	Frederator Studios; Cartoon Hangover; Top Shelf Productions; Bardel Entertainment; Kochalka Quality	
Super Café	4 seasons, 22 episodes	Daniel Baxter, Tommy Watson, Christina "Tina" Alexander	2012–present	HowItShouldHaveEnded.com	YouTube	
Action Faction	1 season, 7 episodes	Jon Etheridge; Tony Schnur	2013	Machinima		
Codefellas	1 season, 12 episodes	David Rees, Brian Spinks	2013			
Hoodies Squad	14 season, 304 episodes	Bartosz Walaszek	2013–present	YouTube, Comedy Central Poland	SPInka Film Studio	
RWBY	9 seasons, 117 episodes	Monty Oum	2013–present	YouTube, Rooster Teeth	Rooster Teeth Animation	
Too Cool! Cartoons	1 season, 11 episodes	Fred Seibert	2013–2014	Cartoon Hangover	Frederator Studios	
Thunder McWylde	1 season, 7 episodes	Ross Everett; J.D. Maccoby; Frank Chad Muniz	2013	YouTube	Danboe Productions, Inc. Facestrong Productions	
Biatches	1 season, 6 episodes	Brad Ableson	2014	Comedy Central		
King Star King	1 season, 6 episodes	JJ Villard, Eric Kaplan	2014	Adult Swim	Kurtis; Titmouse, Inc. Williams Street; Mirari Films (pilot)	
The Cyanide & Happiness Show	4 seasons, 41 episodes	Rob DenBleyker; Dave McElfatrick; Matt Melvin; Kris Wilson	2014–2019	YouTube, Seeso	Explosm Entertainment; Collective Digital Studio; Studio 71	
The Villain Pub	3 seasons, 16 episodes	Daniel Baxter, Tommy Watson, Christina "Tina" Alexander	2014–2024	HowItShouldHaveEnded.com	YouTube	
Animatoons	1 season, 11 episodes	Anderson Mahanski, Felipe Castanhari, Fernando Mendonça	2015–2016	YouTube	Combo Estúdio	
Justice League: Gods and Monsters Chronicles	1 season, 3 episodes	Sam Register; Bruce Timm	2015	Machinima	DC Entertainment; Warner Bros. Animation; Blue Ribbon Content	
Super Science Friends	1 season, 7 episodes	Brett Jubinville	2015–2020	YouTube; VRV	Tinman Creative Studios	
Camp Camp	5 seasons, 64 episodes	Jordan Cwierz; Miles Luna	2016–2024	YouTube, Rooster Teeth	Rooster Teeth Animation	
Camp WWE	2 season, 10 episode	Seth Green	2016	WWE Network (Season 1-2) Peacork (Season 3)	WWE; Stoopid Buddy Stoodios; Film Roman	
Gentlemen Lobsters	1 season, 8 episodes	Kevin Burrows; Matt Milder	2016	Seeso	HotHouse Productions	
HarmonQuest	1 season, 10 episodes	Ryan Elder	2016–2019	Seeso	Harmonious Claptrap; Starburns Industries	
RWBY Chibi	3 seasons, 64 episodes	Monty Oum	2016–2021	YouTube, Rooster Teeth	Rooster Teeth Animation	
Transformers: Combiner Wars	1 season, 8 episode	Eric S. Calderon; George Krstic; F.J. DeSanto	2016	go90	Hasbro Studios; Tatsunoko Production; Machinima, Inc.	
Confinement	1 season, 8 episodes	Lord Bung	2017–present	YouTube		
Ginger Snaps	1 season, 10 episodes	Sono Patel	2017	ABC	Bes Animation; Rubber House; Blue Ribbon Content	
Go! Cartoons	1 season, 12 episodes	Fred Seibert	2017–2018	Cartoon Hangover	Frederator Studios; Sony Pictures Animation	
The Kirlian Frequency	2 seasons, 10 episodes	Cristian Ponce	2017–2021	YouTube, Vimeo, Netflix, Flixxo	Tangram Cine; Decimu Labs	
Sociedade da Virtude			2017	YouTube		
Transformers: Titans Return	1 season, 10 episodes		2017–2018	go90	Machinima, Inc. Hasbro Studios; Tatsunoko Production	
Dallas & Robo	1 season, 8 episodes	Mike Roberts	2018	YouTube Red	ShadowMachine	
Peepoodo & the Super Fuck Friends	2 seasons, 26 episodes	Balak	2018–2021	Blackpills	Bobbypills	
Transformers: Power of the Primes	1 season, 10 episodes		2018	go90 (U.S.); Tumblr (worldwide)	Machinima, Inc. Hasbro Studios; Tatsunoko Production	
Alien: Isolation – The Digital Series	1 season, 7 episodes		2019	IGN	Reverse Engineering Studios (RES); TitraFilm; DVgroup; 20th Century Fox; IGN	
Gen:Lock	1 season, 8 episodes	Gray Haddock	2019–2021	Rooster Teeth	Rooster Teeth Animation	
Hazbin Hotel	2 seasons, 18 episodes	Vivienne Medrano	2019–present	YouTube, Prime Video	SpindleHorse Toons; Bento Box Entertainment; A24; Amazon MGM Studios	
Helluva Boss	2 seasons, 20 episodes	Vivienne Medrano	2019–present	YouTube	SpindleHorse Toons	
Ling Cage	2 seasons, 28 episodes	Dong Xiangbo	2019–2025	Bilibili	YHKT Entertainment	
Meta Runner	3 seasons, 28 episodes	Kevin Lerdwichagul; Luke Lerdwichagul	2019–2022	YouTube	Glitch Productions	
Satina	1 season, 4 episodes	Hannah Daigle	2019–present	YouTube	ScumHouse Studios	

== 2020s ==
Title	Seasons/Episodes	Show Creator	Year	Original channel	Studio	Source
2 Lizards	1 season, 8 episodes	Meriem Bennani, Orian Barki	2020	Instagram Live		
Internecion Cube	1 season, 3 episodes	Liam Vickers	2020	YouTube		
Killer Bean Web Series	1 season, 2 episodes	Jeff Lew	2020	YouTube		
Loafy	1 season, 8 episodes	Bobby Moynihan	2020	Comedy Central	Cartuna; Big Breakfast	
The Stockholms	1 season, 10 episodes	Mike Salcedo	2020–present	YouTube	Explosm Entertainment; Octopie Network	
Song Machine	1 season, 9 episodes	Gorillaz	2020–present	YouTube	The Line	
The Walten Files	1 season, 4 episodes	Martin Walls	2020–present	YouTube	Martin Walls	
Bridge Kids	1 season, 14 episodes	Mike Carfora and Adam Mickiewicz	2021–present	YouTube, Newgrounds	Washington Football Team	
Murder Drones	1 season, 8 episodes	Liam Vickers	2021–2024	YouTube	Glitch Productions	
Office Ladies Animated Series	1 season, 10 episodes	Jenna Fischer, Angela Kinsey	2021	YouTube, Comedy Central	Cartuna	
Studio Killers 404	1 season, 1 episodes	Studio Killers	2021–present	YouTube	Visible Realms	
Chuparsky University	2 seasons, 16 episodes	Mykola Semeniuk, Mykhailo Karpan	2022–present	YouTube		
Lopey	2 seasons, 17 episodes	Alex David	2022–2024	YouTube	Hand Studios	
Monkey Wrench	1 season, 5 episodes	Joshua "Zeurel" Palmer; Ashley Palmer	2022–present	YouTube, Netflix, Newgrounds		
The Amazing Digital Circus	1 season, 9 episodes	Gooseworx	2023–2026	YouTube	Glitch Productions	
Punch Punch Forever!	1 season, 4 episodes	Speedoru	2023–present	YouTube, Newgrounds		
Fugget About It (Shorts)	20 episodes	Nicholas Tabarrok; Willem Wennekers	2024–2025	YouTube	9 Story Media Group	
Middle Class Matt	1 season, 3 episodes	Adam Lustick	2024–present	YouTube	Now What	
The New Norm	1 season, 5 episodes	Akiva Prell; Sophia Prell	2024–present	X		
El Guapo vs. The Narco Vampires	1 season, 1 episode	Jorge R. Gutierrez	2025	YouTube		
The Gaslight District	1 season, 1 episode	Nick Szopko	2025–present	YouTube	Glitch Productions	
Homestuck	1 season, 1 episode	Andrew Hussie	2025-present	YouTube	SpindleRoo	
Knights of Guinevere	1 season, 2 episodes	Dana Terrace, John Bailey, Owen Zach Marcus	2025–present	YouTube	Glitch Productions	
The Normal Mfer	1 season, 10 episodes	Alex Orrelle lawl	2025–present	YouTube	The Hive; CC0 Studios	
The Swines	2 seasons, 13 episodes	Stewart St John	2025–present	YouTube		
Screaming Meat	1 season, 1 episode	Lyle Rath and Kyle J. Mounce	2025–present	YouTube	Wrath Club	
Crooked City	1 season, 1 episode	Rare Americans	2026–present	YouTube	Crooked City Studios; Solis Animation	
La Casa de los Mañosos	1 season, 12 episodes		2026–present	YouTube		

== See also ==
- LGBT representation in American adult animation
- Modern animation in the United States
- Lists of animated feature films
- Independent animation
- Animation in the United States in the television era
- Cartoon violence
