= List of animated internet series =

This is a list of notable animated internet series. This list covers series distributed over the internet, either as a long-form streaming television series or as a short-form web series.

== 1990s ==
Title	Episodes	Country	Year
B. Happy	4	United States	1999–2003
Chilly Beach	24	Canada	1997–2001
The Goddamn George Liquor Program	8	United States	1997–1998
The God & Devil Show	44	United States	1999–2001
Joe Cartoon		United States	1998–present
Princess	3	United States	1999
Starship Regulars	10	United States	1999–2000
Weekend Pussy Hunt	12	United States	1999
WhirlGirl	100	United States	1997–present

== 2000s ==
Title	Episodes	Country	Year
30-Second Bunnies Theatre	91	United States	2004–2020
The 7th Portal	22	United States	2000
The Adventures of Baxter and McGuire	8	United States	2006
Ahmed and Salim	17	Israel	2009–2011
The Adventures of Edward the Less	13	United States	2001
Afterworld	13	United States	2007–2008
Alejo y Valentina	22	Argentina	2002–2005, 2012–2017
Angry Kid	70	United Kingdom	2007–2019
Animator vs. Animation	14	United States	2006–present
Annoying Orange	855	United States	2009–present
asdfmovie	16	United Kingdom	2008–present
Big Bunny	7	United States	2001
Cálico Electrónico	18	Spain	2004–2015
Cartoon Dump	6	United States	2007
Diva Starz	14	United States	2000–2002
DumbLand	8	United States	2002
Eddsworld	83	United Kingdom	2004–present
G.I. Joe: Resolute	11	United States	2009
Gotham Girls	30	United States	2000–2002
Happy Tree Friends	95	United States	2000–present
Hard Drinkin' Lincoln	16	United States	2000–2002
Homestar Runner	2,000+	United States	2000–present
House of Cosbys	4	United States	2005
How It Should Have Ended	224	United States	2005–present
Huevocartoon		Mexico	2002–present
Lizzy the Lezzy		United States	2006–present
Llamas with Hats	13	United States	2009–2015
Making Fiends	24	United States	2003–2005
Masyanya	181	Russia	2001–present
Meet the Amazing Team	10	United States	2009–2012
Mort's End	30	United States	2009–2010
Mr. Freeman	35	Russia	2009–2019
Mr. Wong	13	United States	2000
My Scene	30	United States	2002–2008
Mystery Science Theater 3000	4	United States	2007
Pencilmation	721	United States	2004–2023
Queer Duck	20	United States	2000–2002
Red vs. Blue	350	United States	2003–2024
Salad Fingers	14	United Kingdom	2004–present
Seth MacFarlane's Cavalcade of Cartoon Comedy	50	United States	2008–2009
Simon's Cat	148	United Kingdom	2008–present
Star Dudes	4	United States	2000–2002
The Strangerhood	17	United States	2004–2015
Sweet J Presents	12	United States	2001
Timber Wolf	13	United States	2001
Weebl and Bob	120	United Kingdom	2002–2005
The World of Stainboy	6	United States	2000–2001
Zombie College	12	United States	2000–2001

== 2010s ==
Title	Episodes	Country	Year
Action Faction	5	United States	2013
The Adventures of OG Sherlock Kush	20	United States	2015–2016
Angry Birds MakerSpace	40	Finland	2019–2025
Angry Birds Toons	104	Finland	2013–2016
Battle for Dream Island	116	United States	2010–present
Balgar	28	Bulgaria	2010–present
Barbie: Life in the Dreamhouse	75	United States	2012–2015
Bee and PuppyCat	10	United States	2014–2016
The Big Lez Show	36	Australia	2012–2019
Bravest Warriors	82	United States; Canada (season 4)	2012–2018
Bratz	10	United States	2015
Cyboars	15	United States	2011–2012
Camp Camp	64	United States	2016–2024
Camp WWE	5	United States	2016
Clash-A-Rama	28	United States	2016–2019
Crash Zoom	6	United Kingdom	2015–present
The Cyanide & Happiness Show	41	United States	2014–2019
Dallas & Robo	8	United States	2018
Damaged	12	United States	2013–2014
DanTDM Creates a Big Scene	6	United Kingdom	2017
DC Super Hero Girls	112	United States	2015–2018
Death Battle	211	United States	2010–present
Deep Space 69	40	United States	2012–2018
Don't Hug Me I'm Scared	6	United Kingdom	2011–2018
Dick Figures	54	United States	2010–2015
Epithet Erased	11	United States	2019
Ever After High	68	United States	2013–2016
Freedom Fighters: The Ray	12	United States	2017–2018
Fruit Ninja: Frenzy Force	13	United States; Australia; India	2017
Gen:Lock	16	United States	2019–2021
Ginger Snaps	9	United States	2017
Gummibär & Friends: The Gummy Bear Show	78	Germany	2016–2022
Hanazuki: Full of Treasures	35	United States	2017–2019
HarmonQuest	30	United States	2016–2019
Hazbin Hotel	16	United States	2019–present
Helluva Boss	21 + a pilot episode	United States	2019–present
Hoodies Squad	303 + 2 special episodes	Poland	2013–present
Inspector Chingum	52	India	2018
Justice League: Gods and Monsters Chronicles	3	United States	2015
KatsuWatch	33	United States	2017–2019
King Star King	6	United States	2014
Kings of Atlantis	13	United States	2017
Krogzilla	10	United States	2012
Kurzgesagt	380+	Germany	2013–present
The Land of Boggs	500+	United States	2018–present
The LeBrons	10	United States	2011
The Legend of Lucky Pie	5	China	2015–2018
Lucas the Spider	24	United States	2015–2017
Masameer	107	Saudi Arabia	2011–2019
Meta Runner	28	Australia	2019–2022
Mighty Little Bheem	64	India	2019–2020
Mighty Magiswords	92	United States	2016–2019
Monica Toy	344	Brazil	2013–present
Monster High	172	United States	2010–2016
Minecraft Mini-Series	2	Canada; United States	2017–2018
The Misfortune of Being Ned	20	United States	2013–2014
The Most Popular Girls in School	82	United States	2012–2017
My Little Pony: Equestria Girls		United States	2017–2019
My Magic Pet Morphle	324	United Kingdom; The Netherlands	2011–present
Nomad of Nowhere	12	United States	2018
Ollie & Scoops	10	United States	2019–present
Om Nom Stories	288	United Kingdom; Russia	2011–present
Overwatch Animated Shorts	17	United States	2016–present
Paranormal Action Squad	8	United States	2016
Peepoodo & the Super Fuck Friends	26	France	2018–2021
Polly Pocket	49	United States	2011
PONY.MOV	6	United States	2011–2013
Pugatory	6	United States	2015
RWBY	117	United States	2013–present
RWBY Chibi	74	United States	2016–2021
Samurai! Daycare	10	United States	2012
Sherwood	10	United States; Ireland; New Zealand	2019
Super Café	21	United States	2012–present
Space Adventure Legend Quest	7	United States	2013
Subway Surfers: The Animated Series	11	United States	2018–2019
SuperFuckers	12	United States	2012–2013
Super Science Friends	11	Canada	2015–2020
Talking Tom & Friends	156	United States; Slovenia; Spain; Austria	2014–2021
Talking Friends	10	United States	2012
Tobuscus Adventures	15	United States	2011–2016
TOME: Terrain of Magical Expertise	25	United States	2011–2016
Bouzebal	25	Morocco	2011–present
Too Cool! Cartoons	10	United States	2013–2014
Two More Eggs	90	United States	2015–2017
Transformers: Combiner Wars	8	United States	2016
Transformers: Titans Return	10	United States	2017–2018
UNLEASHED	9	United States	2018–2019
Villainous	6	Mexico	2017–2019, 2021
Villain Pub	16	United States	2014–2024
Vixen	12	United States	2015–2016
Welcome to the Wayne	6	United States	2014
Where's My Water?: Swampy's Underground Adventures	12	United States	2012–2013
Woody Woodpecker	30	United States	2018–2022
WWE Slam City	26	United States	2014
Yarob	11	Saudi Arabia	2018–2019

== 2020s ==
Title	Episodes	Country	Year
The Amazing Digital Circus	9	Australia	2023–2026
Angry Birds Slingshot Stories	113	Finland	2020–present
At Home with Olaf	21	United States	2020
Angry Birds Bubble Trouble	48	Finland	2020–2023
Chikn Nuggit	800+	United States	2020–present
Clara and the Below	TBA	United States	2027
Corpse Talk	13	United Kingdom	2022
Deathstroke: Knights & Dragons	1	United States	2020
Denis and Me	35	Canada	2020–2023
Fred Has Problems	5	United States	2026–present
Gameoverse	1	Australia	2026–present
The Gaslight District	1	Australia	2025–present
Genshin: Elemental Warfare	24	Worldwide	2023–2026
Gil Next Door	1	United States; Ireland	2025–present
The Haunted House Special: Joseon Exorcism Annals	4	South Korea	2023
Hello Neighbor: Welcome to Raven Brooks	13	United States	2022–present
HoYoFair	20	Worldwide	2021–present
Killer Bean	2	United States	2020
Knights of Guinevere	1	Australia	2025–present
The Legend of Hanuman	52	India	2021–present
Long Gone Gulch	1	United States	2021
MechWest	4	United States	2024–present
Mr. Men Little Miss Mini Adventures	24	United Kingdom; Italy	2025–present
Murder Drones	8	Australia	2021–2024
My Little Pony: Tell Your Tale	93	United States; Canada	2022–2024
The Normal Mfer	10	United States; Israel	2025–present
Pauline Hanson's Please Explain	85	Australia	2021–2024
Pinkfong Wonderstar	13	South Korea	2020
Progenitor	6	United States	2023–2025
Recorded by Arizal	4	United States	2020
Song Machine	9	United Kingdom	2020
Soul Mart	TBA	United States	TBA
Strawberry Shortcake: Berry in the Big City	60	Canada	2021–2024
Sunset Paradise	10	Australia	2021
Wuthering Waves Fan Creation Special Program	3	Worldwide	2025–present
