= Annoying Orange (disambiguation) =

Annoying Orange is an American comedy animated web series.

Annoying Orange may also refer to:

- The High Fructose Adventures of Annoying Orange, an American television series based on the web series
- Annoying Orange: Kitchen Carnage, a 2011 video game based on the web series
- A nickname given to Donald Trump by his political opponents
