= Legs from Here to Homeworld =

- Steven Universe episode
- The title card for the episode is shown
- Episode no.: Season 5 Episode 25
- Directed by: Kat Morris (supervising); Liz Artinian (art)
- Written by: Danny Kilgore; Hilary Florido; Tom Herpich
- Story by: Matt Burnett; Ben Levin; Rebecca Sugar; Kat Morris; Joe Johnston
- Editing by: Paul Douglas
- Original air dates: July 21, 2018 (SDCC); July 22, 2018 (Online); December 17, 2018 (Television)
- Running time: 11 minutes

Guest appearances
- Uzo Aduba as Bismuth; Christine Ebersole as White Diamond and White Pearl; Lisa Hannigan as Blue Diamond; Patti LuPone as Yellow Diamond; Mary Elizabeth McGlynn as Dr. Priyanka Maheswaran; Aparna Nancherla as Nephrite

Episode chronology
← Previous "Reunited"	Next → "Familiar"

"Legs from Here to Homeworld" is the 25th episode of the fifth season of the American animated television series Steven Universe, and the 153rd episode of the series overall. It was directed by Kat Morris and Liz Artinian and written and storyboarded by Danny Kilgore, Hilary Florido, and Tom Herpich, from a story by Morris, Matt Burnett, Ben Levin, Joe Johnston, and series creator and executive producer Rebecca Sugar. It premiered at the Steven Universe panel at San Diego Comic-Con on July 21, 2018, before being released on the Cartoon Network app and website the following day; it was broadcast on television on December 17, 2018.

Following up on the events of the previous episode "Reunited", "Legs from Here to Homeworld" sees the Diamonds take Steven and the Crystal Gems back to Homeworld to seek help to cure all corrupted Gems on Earth. The episode ends with the introduction of White Diamond, a character theorized about for years by the fans; although she had been hinted at since early in the show's run and her hand could briefly be seen in a flashback in "Your Mother and Mine" earlier in season five, her existence and name had never been officially confirmed prior to the episode, and she was regarded as one of the biggest mysteries of the series.

The episode received acclaim from critics, who praised White Diamond's reveal, design, and interaction with Steven, as well as Christine Ebersole's performance as the character; many felt that White Diamond's introduction immediately established her as an impactful and intriguing character, with several reviewers calling her "terrifying".

== Plot ==
Yellow and Blue Diamond (Patti LuPone and Lisa Hannigan) have ceased attacking the Crystal Gems after learning that Pink Diamond and Rose Quartz are one and the same. They address Steven (Zach Callison) as Pink Diamond as well, despite his attempt to explain that he is a different person.

The two Diamonds also learn that their attack millennia ago in response to Pink's ostensible demise corrupted the remaining Gems on Earth into feral monsters, instead of obliterating them as intended. Steven convinces them to try to heal the corrupted Gems, but the three's combined attempt to restore the corrupted Gem "Centipeedle" to her original form Nephrite (Aparna Nancherla) produces only a temporary recovery. The Diamonds suggest they could permanently heal corrupted Gems with the aid of White Diamond, who has not left the Gem Homeworld in eons. Pearl (Deedee Magno Hall) warns Steven that White is like no other Gem, not even the other Diamonds.

As the Diamonds' spaceships were destroyed in the previous battle, in order to travel to Homeworld, Steven unearths Pink Diamond's long-abandoned ship, which is shaped like a giant pair of legs, from her junk pile in the desert. Steven, Pearl, Garnet (Estelle), Amethyst (Michaela Dietz), Connie (Grace Rolek), Yellow, and Blue prepare for the journey. Bismuth (Uzo Aduba), due to her animosity toward the Diamonds, decides to stay on Earth and look after the gems of Peridot and Lapis Lazuli, whose physical forms were destabilized during the battle. She advises Steven to take advantage of the fact that the Diamonds think he is Pink Diamond in order to assert himself among them. During the journey, the Diamonds become anxious at the prospect of facing White, fearing her response to learning the truth about the rebellion.

Upon arrival on Homeworld, the group is surprised to be greeted by a large crowd of cheering Gems. Although Yellow and Blue intend to speak with White first to defuse any possible backlash, White Diamond's Pearl (Christine Ebersole) unexpectedly appears and spirits Steven away. Steven is brought to White Diamond (also voiced by Ebersole), who welcomes "Pink Diamond" back without giving him the opportunity to speak, and sends him away to an isolated, empty pink room.

== Production ==
=== Development ===
A mural of White Diamond featured in the season two episode "It Could Have Been Great".

"Legs from Here to Homeworld" was directed by supervising director and co-writer Kat Morris and art director Liz Artinian. Danny Kilgore, Hilary Florido, and former Adventure Time crew member Tom Herpich wrote and storyboarded the episode, from a story by Kat Morris, Matt Burnett, Ben Levin, Joe Johnston, and series creator and executive producer Rebecca Sugar; Herpich originally worked as a background designer on the show's pilot "The Time Thing", and had re-joined the Steven Universe crew for "Reunited", of which he co-wrote the story.

=== White Diamond reveal ===
The existence of White Diamond had been hinted at via background art since early in the series, which led many fans to theorize about her for years. The Economic Times called White Diamond's identity "one of the biggest mysteries of the series."

The character's basic design was first seen in the second season episode "It Could Have Been Great", in which she is represented on a mural with the other Diamonds; her hand could also briefly be seen in a flashback in the season five episode "Your Mother and Mine". However, the character's existence had never been officially confirmed before the episode.

Cartoon Network mentioned the character's name two days before the episode's premiere, when they promoted a 3-D Photobooth at San Diego Comic-Con stating: "Fans also got a sneak peek of White Diamond’s eyes"; however, her name had never been mentioned in the series before the episode. Patti LuPone, who voices Yellow Diamond, unofficially confirmed the character in 2017 by telling a fan that her War Paint co-star Christine Ebersole was the voice of White Diamond. White Diamond's Pearl is also voiced by Ebersole, marking the first time Deedee Magno Hall does not voice a Pearl character.

Sugar stated that the character would be further explored in future episodes and that fans would also learn more about Pink Diamond through White's story.

== Release and reception ==
=== Premiere ===
The episode premiered at the Steven Universe panel during San Diego Comic-Con on July 21, 2018. It was released on the Cartoon Network app and website the following day. It was broadcast on television on December 17, 2018, and it was viewed by 0.631 million people.

=== Critical reception ===
The episode received critical acclaim. Although it was acknowledged as a transition episode, the introduction of White Diamond and her dialogue, design, and Christine Ebersole's performance as the character all received high praise. The scenes with Nephrite and Pink Diamond's ship were also positively received.

Hidden Remote called "Legs from Here to Homeworld" "a good episode in and of itself, but it's not until the final moments that it becomes something altogether frightening". They highly praised White Diamond, calling her "terrifying", and "equal parts captivating and horrifying", stating that "White looks completely unnatural, almost angelic. The design actually is exquisite in how unsettling it is, but what truly takes it over the edge is the voice of Christine Ebersole. She has this kind of uncomfortable ease with the way she speaks that it feels like talking to someone who's having a dissociative episode".

Comic Book Resources highly praised White Diamond, calling her "terrifying in the way that some of the strange and beautiful cosmic entities of DC and Marvel comics are. Her body is perfectly symmetrical, her face is an abstract glowing shape and her voice has a Mary Poppins, sing-song quality to it that dares you to defy her through measured politeness. [...] It's an introduction that is somehow everything and nothing like what we were expecting of the enigmatic Gem Empress." The Mary Sue called White Diamond "scary": "This was quite an impressive introduction to White Diamond as a future antagonist. Not only is their design both alien and unsettling, but paired with their stature and opened-toed heels (and perfectly polished nails), you know this ain’t the diamond to mess with. [...] Just looking at the crack on her Pearl (a crack they no doubt have the power to heal), it tells us all we need to know about the cruelty that White Diamond possesses."

In a group review by several reviewers, The Fandomentals said about White Diamond: "She's amazing. Absolutely amazing. Her design plain work". They also highly praised the scene with Nephrite, noting that the series' crew "interweave therapeutic practices and cognitive behavioral science into a story kids can understand", as the scene is "yet another beautiful metaphor for the healing process. When it comes to trauma, there's never just one part of a person affected. Physical trauma changes how people think about themselves and expression their emotions. Emotional trauma impacts how people behave and mental conditioning from abuse can warp people's ability to feel and express it, etc." They also noted that Pink Diamond's ship was "magnificent", adding "we could not love the leg ship more than we do".

Gizmodo also highly praised White Diamond, stating that "while Blue and Yellow Diamond have been framed as the most terrifying villains Steven and the Gems might ever face, White Diamond makes the two of them seem like mini bosses by comparison", while The Economic Times called her "an intimidating force". TheWrap praised Ebersole's performance, stating that she "chilled audiences with her condescending speech".

Den of Geek! gave a positive review, feeling that "[Yellow and White Diamond] offer something very important for Steven, a way to finally vent frustrations with his mom", but complaining that the episode "feels more like a preview of things to come. On its own? Totally fine little transition but it's less about the content here and more about what's coming next."
