= Kevin Nalty =

American comedian (born 1969)

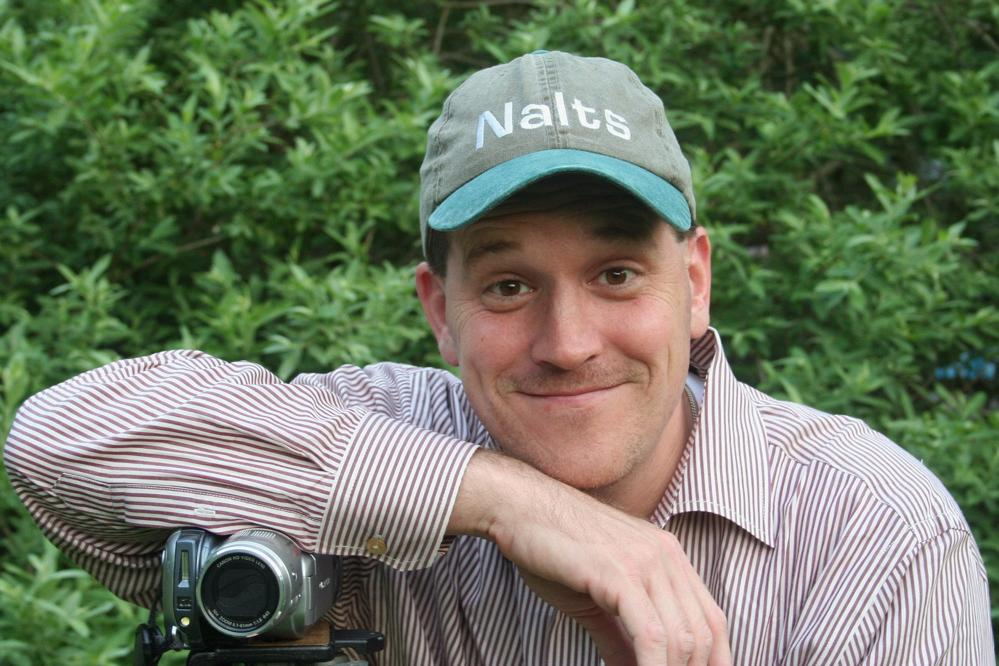
- Nalty in 2008
- Born: Kevin Hanemann Nalty; May 12, 1969 (age 57); New Orleans, Louisiana, U.S.
- Occupations: Vlogging, comedian, blogger
- Years active: 2006–present
- Notable work: "Farting in Public" "Viral Video Genius -- Loses His Cool When Confronted" "N.A.P.P.Y."
- Website: www.kevinnalts.com

Kevin Hanemann Nalty (born May 12, 1969 in New Orleans, Louisiana), known professionally as Nalts, is an American Internet personality and YouTuber.

Nalty began on YouTube as one of the top-20 most-viewed comedy channels, and was ranked as one of YouTube's Most Subscribed users during the site's early years. By 2016, he had 297 million views on the site.

He is the author of Beyond Viral: How to Attract Customers, Promote Your Brand, and Make Money with Online Video (2010). Nalty speaks at marketing conferences and events, and spoke about "viral video" in Boston at the 2011 International Society for Humor Studies conference in Boston. He juggles and is listed in the "Who's Who in the World of Video Marketing."

Nalty first gained notoriety for a video featured on YouTube's front page the first week of January 2007 - "Viral Video Genius - Loses His Cool When Confronted" - where he plays a skivvy-wearing, geeky intellectual passionate about viral video making. His second featured video, "Farting in Public," showed a young teenager named depicted (Nalty's nephew's friend) using a fart machine in public places. Another of his videos, "Crackberry Blackberry", was selected as an official honoree at the 11th Annual Webby Awards. Nalty writes plays and performs in community theater in New Hope Pa.

Nalty made a video to announce his departure from his role as a Merck Product Director, and appears in many articles about memorable resignations. He works as a pharmaceutical marketing and speaks about healthcare trends.

He is the voice of Knife in the popular web series Annoying Orange. He has been sponsored by Fox Broadcasting, MTV, Logitech, Microsoft, Holiday Inn Express, Crowne Plaza, and Mentos.

== Media appearances ==
Buzzfeed covered Nalty's history of pranks, he was on 2020 podcast discussing his divorce, and his videos have appeared on CNN, ABC Nightline, The Today Show, Good Morning America, CBS News, Fox News and the BBC segment "Click", where one of his videos was featured on the program. He juggles and appeared as a guest judge on "Viral Video Showdown," was featured in the film "I Want My Three Minutes Back," and his videos have been featured on MTV's "Pranked." He has also appeared on a live version of the digital talk show Tom Green Live, which was broadcast at the Digital Content NewFront in June, 2009. His blog, WillVideoForFood, lists media appearances in reverse chronological order.

== Personal ==
Nalty, divorced in 2020, has four adult children: Katie, Patrick, Grant, and Charlie. He lives in rural Pennsylvania with his cat Oliver. Nalty highlights the children in most of his videos. He graduated from Georgetown Preparatory High School in Rockville, Maryland, has an undergraduate degree from Georgetown, and an MBA in marketing and entrepreneurship from Babson College of Boston.

== See also ==
- List of YouTube celebrities
- YouTube gatherings
