= Dane Boedigheimer =

American filmmaker and actress (born 1978)

- Born: Dane Willard Boedigheimer; September 28, 1978 (age 48); Itasca County, Minnesota, U.S.
- Other name: Dane Boe
- Education: Minnesota State University Moorhead
- Years active: 1998–present
- Notable work: Annoying Orange; The High Fructose Adventures of Annoying Orange
- Spouse: Theresa Barket (m. 2012)

Dane Willard Boedigheimer (born September 28, 1978), better known by her (Note: Boedigheimer uses both she/her and they/them pronouns. This article uses she/her for consistency.) pseudonym Dane Boe, is an American internet personality, actress, voice actress, writer, animator, filmmaker, and musician. She is known for creating the web series Annoying Orange and the spin-off television series The High Fructose Adventures of Annoying Orange; Boedigheimer provides the voice of the title character along with others in both productions and has produced several original songs.

Boedigheimer began making videos with a 8mm camcorder as a teenager. Boedigheimer was a speech communications major at Minnesota State University Moorhead, and became a production assistant for MTV's Pimp My Ride three years after earning her degree. She later founded the company Gagfilms in 2005.

The talking food videos Boedigheimer had previously done for JibJab inspired and prepared her to create the first original Annoying Orange video. Due to the success of the video, she began creating more, and ultimately became an online YouTube franchise. The success of the Annoying Orange series has been parlayed into a spin-off television series called The High Fructose Adventures of Annoying Orange, a video game, a range of toys, a clothing line, and costumes.

== Early life and education ==
Dane Willard Boedigheimer was born in Itasca County, Minnesota, to Peter and Julie (née Barsness) Boedigheimer. Boedigheimer has a younger brother, Lucas. Her father was a roofer. Boedigheimer was raised in Harwood, North Dakota, in the Fargo–Moorhead area, where she frequently made home videos as a teen. For these videos, Boedigheimer began using her parents' 8mm video camera that she got for Christmas at the age of 12; "I was spending entire days making short videos with my younger brother. It all just blossomed from there. I remember sitting in my room for hours editing my videos with two VCRs. It was painstaking, but I loved it. There was something magical about making stories come to life right in front of my eyes, no matter how crappy those stories were!" This would later inspire Boedigheimer to work as a camera operator for local TV stations.

The first movie Boedigheimer made was a joint effort with her younger brother Lucas called "Pugzilla." The movie featured a toy barnyard set and some Matchbox cars. Boedigheimer stated "Pretty soon I started realizing maybe I could actually do this for a living." Boedigheimer attended West Fargo High School where she graduated in 1997.

During her college years, Boedigheimer studied filmmaking at Minnesota State University Moorhead between 1998 and 2003, where she met Spencer Grove as an undergraduate. She was a major in speech communications with an emphasis in film studies, which she has said to be a preparation for the creation of Annoying Orange; "The program (at MSUM) was very small when I was there, and you had to make things work with a small budget. I think that experience actually kind of helped." She also worked at a one-hour photo lab during her college years, stating "I only got in on one shoot, so that was the extent of that".

MSUM Professor Greg Carlson, who had Boedigheimer as a student in three of his classes, was impressed by how down-to-earth Boedigheimer was in school, and considered her "tremendously friendly, genuine and easy-going." He also said, "Dane just had a total exuberance for wanting to create stuff. You asked for one thing from him, he gives you three. He's that kind of person."

One of Boedigheimer's final projects at MSUM, a full-length feature film titled Trash TV, was shown at the Fargo Theatre, where there were more than 200 people who showed up to watch the movie. Boedigheimer describes the film as a clip show, with spoofs of commercials and movies.

== Career ==
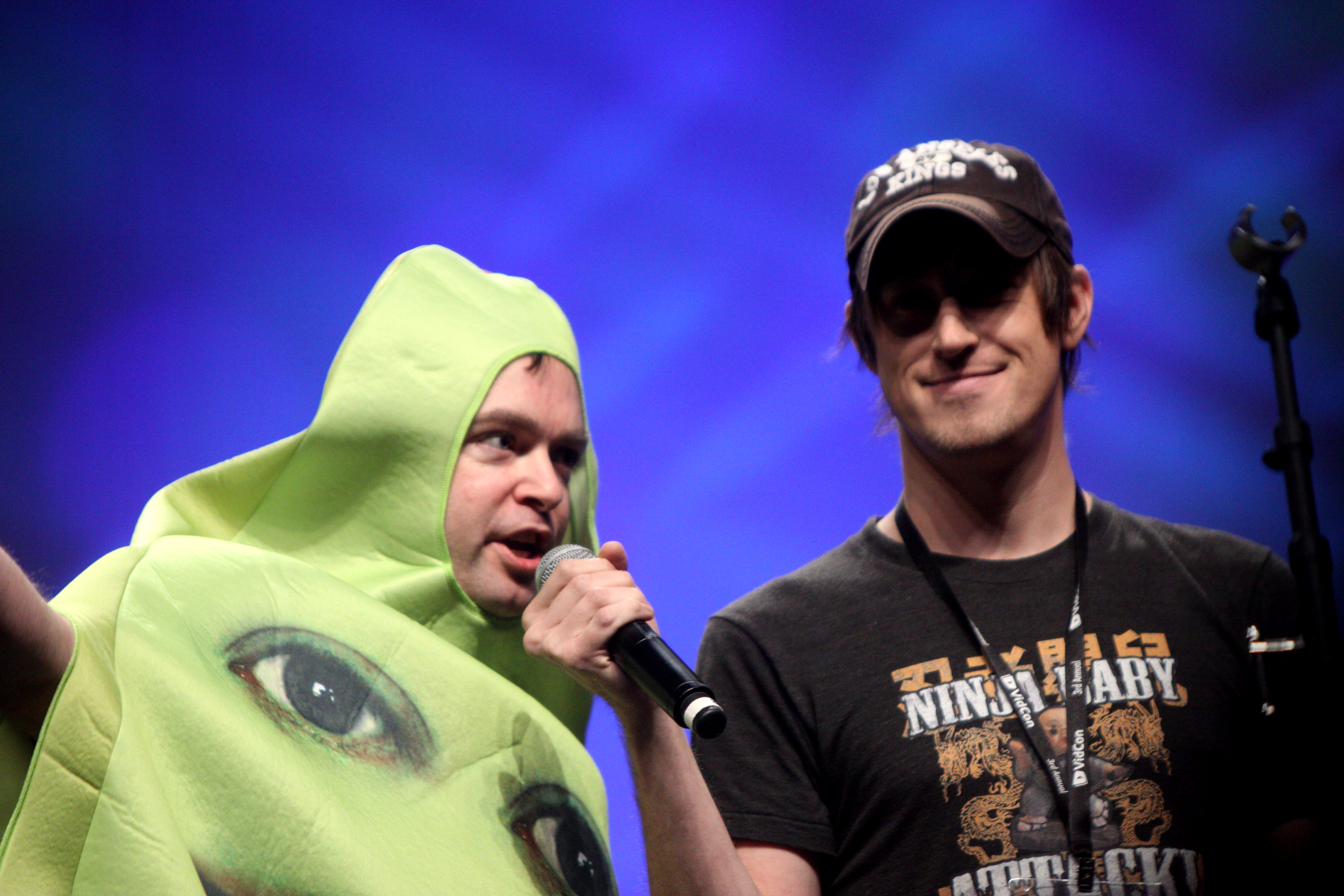
Boedigheimer (right) made films with her friend Bob Jennings (left), also known as Bobjenz.

After finishing college, Boedigheimer, her girlfriend, and Grove moved to Bakersfield, California, and then in 2004, upon Grove's recommendation, moved to Los Angeles, where, between October 2004 and December 2005, they both worked as production assistants for MTV's Pimp My Ride, with Boedigheimer earning $700 a week. However, the 60- and 80-hour workweeks would allow little to no time to do her movie-making at home. After finishing working for the show, Boedigheimer decided that she didn't want to pursue a career in television; "It wasn't me", she said. "I wanted to be creative and do things my own way."

On Valentine's Day 2005, Boedigheimer founded the company Gagfilms, which slowly built a core of fans. In 2006, in which she became a freelance filmmaker in January of that same year, Boedigheimer had opened two YouTube channels named Daneboe and Gagfilms, producing several video series. Boedigheimer was also a multimedia reporter at The Bakersfield Californian during this time, between June 2006 and August 2007.

=== Annoying Orange ===
Before Annoying Orange, Boedigheimer had done many talking food videos for her own channel and other sites including JibJab (2005–2008). She said in an interview that the idea for Annoying Orange was a culmination of the talking food videos, puns and special effects that she had come up with and done before.

The original video was planned to be titled The Annoying Apple, but when Boedigheimer started animating the video, she figured it would be easier to put features on an orange than an apple and make it more visible. Annoying Orange was initially never intended to be a series. However, as the video became popular, Many viewers requested more videos, and after the 4th episode, Boedigheimer decided to make it a full-time series. Following the success of the series, a channel dedicated to Annoying Orange was created under the name "realannoyingorange" on January 31, 2010. The success of the series would also receive the attention of Fargo advertising agency H2M, who, in 2006, created its own "Talking Orange", which is the spokesman for an ad campaign for the North Dakota Department of Transportation. Both of the two characters were two anthropomorphic oranges with ties to the Fargo-Moorhead area. Despite only slightly resembling the "Talking Orange", Annoying Orange was looked into by H2M's attorneys due to intellectual property issues. Boedigheimer stated that she had not seen the "Talking Orange" videos prior to the disagreement, also believing that the characters were not similar in any other aspect.

New episodes of Annoying Orange were initially released on a weekly, currently bi-weekly basis, with a few exceptions. The episodes are released every Friday on realannoyingorange's YouTube channel, now the official Annoying Orange channel.

== Awards and reception ==
In 2006, Boedigheimer's movie short, titled "Eggs", won top honors at Bolt.com's 1-Minute Film Festival. The video was conceived while cooking with her girlfriend in their Ming Avenue apartment. She later used the $5,000 award for a new camera.

Boedigheimer's videos have been viewed over 500 million times and have been featured on TV, popular entertainment, news, and video sharing websites. In 2010, Boedigheimer's YouTube channel had almost 350 million views and earned an income of $288,000 from ads. Due to the success from the television version of Annoying Orange, Boedigheimer was also one of the final presenters of the 64th Primetime Creative Arts Emmy Awards.

== Personal life ==
Boedigheimer married Theresa Barket, a frequent collaborator in her videos, in 2012. They live in Sierra Madre, California.

Boedigheimer is a transgender woman. She came out publicly as nonbinary and transgender in December 2023 on a YouTube interview with Smosh, and then as a trans woman on May 6, 2025. She has gone through gender-affirming hormone therapy since 2022 as well as facial feminization surgery and breast augmentation in 2024. Boedigheimer has red–green color blindness.

== Filmography ==
Year	Title	Creator	Writer	Animator	Actor	Role	Notes
2002	Donkey Punch	No	No	No	Yes	Shot Taker	Short film
2006–2011	From the Fridge	Yes	Yes	Yes	Yes	Various characters Herself	Web series (produced by GagFilms)
2008–2011	Scary Faces	Yes	No	No	Yes	Herself	Web series (produced by GagFilms)
2008–2009	Viral Killer	Yes	No	No	Yes	Kool Aid Killer	Web series (produced by GagFilms)
2008	SuperHero School	Yes	Yes	Yes	Yes	Man with cat	Short film
2009–2013	My Roommate Mario	Yes	No	No	Yes	Herself; Mario	Web series (produced by GagFilms)
2009–present	Annoying Orange	Yes	Yes	Yes	Yes	Orange; Pear; Midget Apple; Marshmallow; Herself; Various characters	Web series (produced by GagFilms)
2010	Smosh	No	No	No	Yes	Orange	Web series Episode: "Harry Potter Deleted Scenes!"
2012–2013	Ultimate Cartoon Fighting	No	No	No	Yes	Orange	Episode: "Goku vs. Everyone" (ep . 7)
2012–2014	The High Fructose Adventures of Annoying Orange	Yes	No	No	Yes	Orange; Pear; Midget Apple; Marshmallow Herself; Various characters	TV series for Cartoon Network
2013	Just Shut Up!	No	No	No	Yes	Dane	Episode: "Wild Animals! ft. Daneboe" (ep. 6)
2013–2014	The Misfortune of Being Ned	Yes	Yes	No	Yes	Orange	Annoying Orange's YouTube show
2013	Thunder McWylde	Yes	Yes	No	Yes	Thunder	Daneboe's YouTube show
2014	The Marshmallow Show	Yes	Yes	Yes	Yes	Marshmallow, Various characters	Annoying Orange's YouTube show
2014	D.E.R.P.	Yes	No	No	Yes	Various characters	Annoying Orange's YouTube show
2015	The Internetest safety video on the Internet	No	No	No	Yes	Orange	Delta Air Lines safety video; cameo
