= Annoying Orange: Kitchen Carnage =

2011 video game

Annoying Orange: Carnage
- Original icon in 2011
- Developer: Bottle Rocket
- Publishers: Eastedge Studios; 14th Hour Productions, LLC
- Platform: iOS
- Release: April 7, 2011
- Genre: Casual
- Mode: Single-player

Annoying Orange: Carnage (formerly Annoying Orange: Kitchen Carnage) is a 2011 casual mobile game developed by Bottle Rocket and published by Eastedge Studios. Based on the comedy web series Annoying Orange, players throw various produce items into blenders across a kitchen, earning them points for each successful throw. A total score will be calculated when a time limit has been reached.

Carnage was released for iOS on April 7, 2011. The game received mixed reviews from critics, who praised the game for its simple, progressive, and addictive gameplay, however posed concerns over its repetitive use of voice lines and its realistic depiction of violence.

== Gameplay ==
Annoying Orange: Kitchen Carnage is a casual arcade-style mobile game. The objective of Carnage is to throw various produce items across a kitchen and land them in a series of blenders to earn points in a set time limit. The number of points earned depends on the path travelled, such that bouncing from a wall will earn more points than a direct route to the blender. Rapidly throwing produce into blenders without missing will grant bonus points, and successfully throwing them in blenders fills a "juice meter", which if full, proceeds the player to the next level.

As each level progresses, more blenders will appear, earning the player a certain number of points depending on the speed of the blender's movement. A range hood and cutting board will occasionally be revealed, for which each successful throw earns the player a large number of points and extra time respectively. A display of the final score will be shown at the end of the game.

== Development and release ==
Carnage was developed by Bottle Rocket and published by Eastedge Studios. The game is based on the comedy web series Annoying Orange, and was released on April 7, 2011, for iOS devices. Dane Boedigheimer, creator of Annoying Orange, summarized Carnage as having similar content as the web series, in which she said it "transitions perfectly to a fast paced arcade-style game".

== Reception ==
Reception

Aggregate score
Aggregator	Score
Metacritic	68/100

Review scores
Publication	Score
Gamezebo	80/100
AppSpy	3/5
Slide to Play	3/4
Common Sense Media	4/5
148Apps	3/5
AppSafari	3.5/5
Modojo	3/5

Annoying Orange: Kitchen Carnage received "mixed or average" reviews from critics according to review aggregator Metacritic. Carnage was highlighted for its simple and addictive gameplay, while criticisms drew from its repetitive use of voice lines and realistic depiction of violence.

Critics commented on the addictive gameplay for its simplicity, progressiveness, and speed. Nadia Oxford writing for Slide to Play admired the addictiveness and pacing of the game, as Oxford called it having "a lot of bizarre split-second decisions". Andrew Nesvadba of AppSpy praised the variety of progressive factors in the levels, such as bonus points from tricky throws and new characters with each level. 148Apps's Phillip Levin found the gameplay to be easy to learn and recommended it for players who are looking for short-term gameplay, however called Carange as lacking replayability due to its simplicity. A reviewer writing for Modojo praised Bottle Rocket for "captur[ing] the spirit" of the web series, but wished for longer gameplay by allowing more options to extend the timer.

Despite the gameplay, the voice lines and graphics were criticized. In a review from Gamezebo, Talor Berthelson found the repetitive use of voice lines to be annoying, calling Orange as "constantly berating you in the background". Tracy Yonemoto of AppSafari acknowledged the addictive gameplay and compared it to Skee-Ball, however had the same opinion as Berthelson regarding the spoken lines. Nesvadba also expressed negatively to the voice lines, while noting that the feature can be turned off. Modojo opined that the graphics made it hard to determine where to throw as they described Carnage as a "2D game that makes you think in 3D". Common Sense Media reviewer Jonathan Liu gave Carnage an age rating of 13 and up due to the violent effects of the produce being sliced. He stated that the game was similar to Paper Toss and although found it entertaining, advised that it was not suitable for children because of its brand promotion and emphasis on violence.
