= The Swines =

American adult animated web series

- Genre: Adult animation; Comedy drama
- Created by: Stewart St John
- Written by: Stewart St John; Todd Fisher; Michael Plahuta
- Directed by: Stewart St John
- Voices of: Stewart St John; Todd Fisher; Michael Plahuta
- Country of origin: United States
- Original language: English
- No. of seasons: 2
- No. of episodes: 13

Production
- Executive producers: Stewart St John; Todd Fisher; Michael Plahuta
- Editor: Stewart St John
- Running time: 8–21 minutes
- Production company: WonkyBot Animation

Original release
- Network: YouTube
- Release: November 20, 2025 – present

The Swines is an American adult animated web series created by Stewart St John and produced by WonkyBot Animation.

== Episodes ==
=== Season 1 (2025–2026) ===
No. overall	No. in season	Title	Original release date
1	1	"Goodbye Hoggywood"	November 20, 2025
