= Star Dudes =

2000 parody web series

Poster for the original Star Dudes

Star Dudes is an Adobe Flash animated web series that premiered in 2000. Created by animator Rich Cando, the series presents the major events of several Star Wars films condensed down to less than five minutes per film. The stylized characters seen in the films speak only in word balloons, and all dialogue contains the word "Dude!"

One of the first Flash-animated series on the internet, the Star Dudes series attracted attention from the media, with profiles on the series appearing on TechTV's The Screen Savers, The Christian Science Monitor, The Independent, and Yahoo! Internet Life magazine.

In 2002, the third Star Dudes film, Return of the Dude, was featured in the Design+ exhibition at the Museum of Contemporary Art in Taipei, Taiwan. In 2005, the original Star Dudes exhibited as part of the Spielzeugmuseum Star Wars toy exhibition in Nuremberg, Germany.

Cando announced a fifth Star Dudes short in 2002, but to date it has not been completed.

== Episodes ==
- Star Dudes (2000)
- The Bad Dudes Strike Back (2000)
- Return of the Dude (2001)
- The Phantom Dude (2002)
- Attack of the Dudes (announced but incomplete)
- Revenge of the Dudes (announced but incomplete)
