= The Misfortune of Being Ned =

- Genre: Animation; Black comedy
- Created by: Dane Boedigheimer and Bobjenz
- Written by: Bobjenz; Aaron Massey; Spencer Grove
- Voices of: Steve Zaragoza; Kevin Brueck; Meghan Camarena; Bobjenz
- Country of origin: United States
- Original language: English
- No. of seasons: 2
- No. of episodes: 20

Production
- Producer: Bob Harper
- Running time: ~1 minute
- Production company: Collective Digital Studio

Original release
- Network: YouTube
- Release: October 9, 2013 – April 23, 2014

Related
- Annoying Orange

The Misfortune of Being Ned is an American animated short 1-minute web series created by the producers of the Annoying Orange web series. The series centers on the titular character of Ned, voice acted by Steve Zaragoza, a young boy who repeatedly finds himself in unfortunate situations that usually get him killed. Having debuted as part of the Annoying Orange "Shocktober" event on October 9, 2013, the series aired every Wednesday, and ended April 23, 2014.

== Characters ==
- Ned (voiced by Steve Zaragoza) is the titular protagonist of every episode. He is last seen going into a kitchen studio to meet the Annoying Orange whom he gets annoyed by. He suddenly wants to leave the kitchen but gets erased to a single head.
- Greg (voiced by Kevin Brueck) is a school bully and the main antagonist of the series
- Wendy (voiced by Meghan Camarena) is Ned's girlfriend in most episodes including Ned Wins and Jet Pack.
- Sketchy Dude (voiced by Bobjenz) a guy who gets Ned murdered frequently.

== Episodes ==
=== Series overview ===
Season	Episodes	Originally released	
Season	Episodes	First released	Last released
1	10	October 9, 2013	December 18, 2013
2	10	February 19, 2014	April 23, 2014

=== Season 1 (2013) ===
No.	Title	Original release date	Ned's Misfortune
1	"Free Balloons"	October 9, 2013	Ned gets hit with NORAD projectiles, plummets to the ground, and gets sprayed by van smoke.
Ned takes a ride on a free balloon, only to find himself attacked as an airborne threat. Note: This episode was featured as a sneak peek in Annoying Orange's Shocktober 2013, which is a pun of October.
2	"Spider-Ned"	October 16, 2013	Ned turns into a spider and gets attacked by the janitor.
Ned visits a medical research facility, and upon being bitten by a radioactive arachnid, turns into a spider.
3	"Pumpkin Ned"	October 23, 2013	Ned's head gets replaced by a pumpkin.
Ned goes out trick-or-treating, and in a last-minute attempt after forgetting to pick a costume, pretends to be the Headless Horseman before confronting the being himself.
4	"Hogwarts"	October 30, 2013	Ned turns into a pig from the disease Hogwarts.
In a parody of the introduction to Harry Potter and the Philosopher's Stone, Ned receives a letter in the mail notifying him that he has been admitted into Hogwarts... or so he thinks.
5	"Ned Goes to Mars"	November 6, 2013	Ned gets eaten by an alien from Mars.
Ned arrives on Mars after a long flight in space, only to be confronted by his rival, Greg.
6	"Going Up"	November 13, 2013	Ned gets shot by multiple arrows and his body explodes.
Ned catches an elevator which leads him straight to the arena from The Hunger Games.
7	"Spelling Bee"	November 20, 2013	Ned gets stung by a "spelling bee".
Ned spells a word right in the school spelling bee and his prize is... a spelling bee, literally a real bee.
8	"The Chronicles of Ned"	December 4, 2013	Ned gets eaten by a pride of lions.
Ned goes to a haunted house and finds a mystical wardrobe, Ned thinks it would take him to Narnia, but it takes him to a lions' den full of lions at a local zoo instead of Narnia.
9	"The Joke's on Ned"	December 11, 2013	Ned gets beaten by Batman after his face-paint, and the face paint costed 3 dollars for Ned.
Ned goes to a carnival; he has a lot of fun and has his face painted as a clown, but Batman mistakes Ned for the Joker.
10	"Merry Nedmas!"	December 18, 2013	Ned gets crushed, beaten and burnt into the toy machine thus becoming a jack-in-the-box, which is sent to Greg on Christmas Day.
Ned (who is dressed up as an elf) is working for Santa Claus, but he, however, ends becoming a jack-in-the-box when he has a look inside the toy machine.

=== Season 2 (2014) ===
On December 18, 2013, Daneboe announced that The Misfortune of Being Ned would be renewed for a second season. The season premiered on February 19, 2014, with more episodes during the year.

No.	Title	Original release date	Ned's Misfortune
11	"Ned Wins!!!"	February 19, 2014	Ned wakes up realizing it was just a dream and an evil teddy bear attacks him with an axe.
Ned climbs on Mount Everest, and defeats Greg the Godzilla, flies on a bald eagle and it got changed into his girlfriend and wins the heart of his girlfriend Wendy, he finds out that it was all just a dream.
12	"Ball Boy"	February 26, 2014	Ned gets thrown and hit like a football by the two football teams, thus after the Home team won the match, Ned earns an alligator and it eats him and the football staff needs a new football.
Two teams are having a Football Match, but when the football burst, Ned who is in charge of getting new footballs, ran out of footballs, and becomes the new football instead.
13	"Ice Fishing"	March 5, 2014	Ned is given superhero powers but no-one believes he's a real superhero and he gets a prank call from the Justice League saying he should join them.
Ned is thrown underwater when ice fishing with Wendy and Greg, and a merman (presumed to be Poseidon or Neptune) gives Ned powers to be Aquaman. At Comic Con, no one believes he is the real Aquaman.
14	"Family Reunion"	March 12, 2014	Ned's family reunion gets ruined when a volcano erupts and kills everyone.
Ned's family reunion is in chaos when Ned's family gets killed by natural and unnatural causes. Note: This episode reveals that Ned's family is jinxed.
15	"Jet Pack"	March 19, 2014	Ned gets killed when he crashes a jet pack and is run over by a bus.
Ned misses the school bus and is given a jet pack so he can get to school, but crashes it outside the school and gets ran over by the school bus.
16	"Video Games"	March 26, 2014	Ned is killed by a character in his new video game console.
Ned's parents get him a hologram gaming system but a character out of the game fights him and kills him.
17	"Ned & the Beanstalk"	April 2, 2014	Ned is eaten by a giant.
Ned plants some magic beans which grow into a huge beanstalk. He climbs it and is taken to a "giant spa" where he is pampered. However, after this he is eaten by Greg the Giant.
18	"Time Machine"	April 9, 2014	Ned is killed by the T-1000 and squashed by the Tardis.
Ned is sent to go back to the future but before he can gets stopped by a police car. Driving it is a future baddy sent to kill Ned. He stabs Ned before Ned is squashed by the Tardis which lands on top of him.
19	"Easter Egg Hunt"	April 16, 2014	Ned gets eaten by a T-rex.
Ned goes on an Easter egg hunt and tries to find a special egg. He finds it but it turns out it's a dinosaur egg and the baby dinosaur's mother devours Ned.
20	"Ned Gets Annoyed"	April 23, 2014	Ned loses everything but his head because of the eraser.
In the series finale, Ned goes to the kitchen studio to meet the Annoying Orange. However, he soon loses his body after Orange summons an eraser. Note: It is said at the end of the video that a new talk show titled The Marshmallow Show was announced for premiere on June 4.
