= Cálico Electrónico =

Spanish Flash series

- Also known as: Cálico Electrónico: La Serie Flash
- Created by: Nikodemo
- Voices of: Niko; Manel Muzas; Raúl Escolano; Karen Gutierrez; Kris Cembellín; Rafiki Cano; Santi Riscos; Sebastián Fábregas; Inocuo
- Country of origin: Spain

Original release
- Network: YouTube
- Release: June 1, 2004 – May 1, 2015

Cálico Electrónico: La Serie Flash was a Spanish Flash animated web series created by Nikodemo Animation in 2004.

Set in 'Electronic City', its protagonist is a superhero far from the 'classic' hero profile: a short, chubby and not-powered Spanish man ('aspañol' as is called in the series). He risks his life time and again to save the city, using gadgets picked up at the Electronicaweb store.

The story's usual plot proceeds as follows: A monster or a criminal attacks the city, Cálico tries to stop it and fails, goes to Electronicaweb, gets a new gadget, and saves the day. Some "bloopers" are displayed during the credits at the end of the episode.

Even though Cálico is the main character, many side series have run with it, featuring many characters from the original series.

On June 4, 2009, Nikodemo Animation was shut down completely by its owners due to bankruptcy, which meant the cancellation of all in-progress Cálico Electrónico series' related content, including, but not limited to, Rumbarola and animation series.

== Characters ==
=== Main ===
- Cálico Electrónico: Superhero, real name Cálico Jack
- Muzamán: Salesman of Electronicaweb & friend of Cálico Eléctrónico.
- Ardorín: Nephew of Cálico Jack, future self Cálico Lúbrico.

=== Secondary ===
- Perchita: Character inspired in Nobita, he is a drug addict.
- Donramon: Character inspired in Doraemon, he is a dealer.
- Alarico: Brother of Witerico and Chindasvinta.
- Witerico: Brother of Alarico and Chindasvinta.
- Chindasvinta: Sister of Witerico and Alarico.
- Sombra Oscura: Character that is hidden from the enemies with his outfit.
- Lobohombre: Character that transforms Aznar when in contact with full moon
- Chacho Migué: The gypsy salesman of Electroni Migué and Electronicaweb's direct competition.

== Chapters ==
Calico's series was 3 seasons long with 6 episodes per season, from 2004 to 2008.

=== Season 1 ===
- 1) El enemigo digital
- 2) Los Ri-txars invasores
- 3) El Lobombre
- 4) Los niños mutantes de Sanildefonso
- 5) Historia de amor
- 6) Corretón

=== Season 2 ===
- 1) El fin de Cálico
- 2) El fin de Cálico (Part II)
- 3) El día que conocí a un super-héroe
- 4) Cómo ser Cálico Electrónico
- 5) Porque yo lo valgo...
- 6) Cálico

=== Season 3 ===
- 1) Se ha escrito una escabechina
- 2) Se ha escrito una escabechina (Part II)
- 3) Los pelusos carambanales y otras boludeses
- 4) Mira quién lucha
- 5) El Ventri Loco
- 6) La generación de la bola

=== Others ===
- Noche de paz 2005
- Microsoft Developer Days
- Capítulo especial de Navidad 2007
- Cálico contra Xona-tan y los Ri-txars

== Cápsulas/Capsules ==
From June 2008 until its end, Nikodemos produced a weekly "capsule", which were short episodes. At the end of every capsule, some character from the Cálico universe answered the questions sent by the series' fans by SMS.

- Cápsula 1: "Culones"
- Cápsula 2: "Seres Superiores"
- Cápsula 3: "Semos Orinales"
- Cápsula 4: "REC II"
- Cápsula 5: "San Cayetano"
- Cápsula 6: "Dani no está"
- Cápsula 7: "El Increible Julc"
- Cápsula 8: "Héroe a distancia"
- Cápsula 9: "Pul Fittion"
- Cápsula 10: "¿Salen o no salen?"
- Cápsula 11: "El Sustituto"
- Cápsula 12: "El del Cabello Oscuro"
- Cápsula 13: "Horario Laboral"
- Cápsula 14: "Alaricoyo"
- Cápsula 15: "Despeñaperros M."
- Cápsula 16: "Jodidas Chuches"
- Cápsula 17: "Minijuegos"
- Cápsula 18: "El Reformao"
- Cápsula 19: "Special SMS"
- Cápsula 20: "Esto es Jalogüin"
- Cápsula 21: "La nueva Electronicaweb"
- Cápsula 22: "Tiburón"
- Cápsula 23: "Animalicos"
- Cápsula 24: "Si yo fuera rico"
- Cápsula 25: "Mi gatete Don Ramon"
- Cápsula 26: "El Segurata"
- Cápsula 27: "Trabajo Navideño"
- Cápsula 28: "¡Es una Fieshta!"
- Cápsula 29: "La Güi"
- Cápsula 30: "Jodida Suerte"
- Cápsula 31: "La Tribu de los Chachos"
- Cápsula 32: "Evacuación Máxima"
- Cápsula 33: "Sus muertos vivientes"
- Cápsula 34: "El Conquistador"
- Cápsula 35: "Yelouston"
- Cápsula 36: "Carnavá Carnavá"
- Cápsula 37: "Guachmen"
- Cápsula 38: "Apagón"
- Cápsula 39: "El dia der papa"
- Cápsula 40: "No soy un Supermán"

== Spin-offs ==
- Huérfanos Electrónicos
- Los Niños Mutantes De Sanildefonso
- Los Castings de Lobombre y Zombón
