= Sugar Zaza =

Israeli comedy YouTube channel

- Born: Or Paz; Tom Trager

YouTube information
- Channel: Sugar Zaza
- Years active: 2006–present
- Genre: Comedy
- Subscribers: 302 thousand
- Views: 117 million
- Last updated: September 1, 2024

Sugar Zaza (Hebrew: שוגר זאזא) is the nickname for the Israeli comedian duo of Tom Trager (Hebrew: תום טרגר; born January 6, 1988) and Or Paz (Hebrew: אור פז; born October 6, 1988). The two began working in 2006 as part of "Flix" website run by Tapuz, later creating television productions and beginning a YouTube channel for comedy sketches and web series.

== History ==
=== Early ventures ===
On Flix, the duo published many collaborative skits with other actors, the first being called "The Ackerman Family", released on September 19, 2006. The skit was a parody of American sitcoms, and was about 12 minutes long. They published 22 more skits up until the end of June 2008.

In early 2009, Trager and Paz published the first episode of the animated web television series, Ahmed and Salim. They independently produced and voiced all the characters for the show. The series follows two lazy brothers, Ahmed and Salim, whose father is a fascist anti-Semitic terrorist who wants them to follow in his footsteps, while all they want to do is play video games and surf the internet. The series has 22 episodes in total. It achieved online virality and global success. A 22-minute pilot for a television show was produced for the cable TV channel Bip. The channel was shut down at the end of 2010, and the series was never produced.

In 2010, the producers of Night Tube reached out to Trager and Paz with a request to produce another series, Mindy and the Magician. Following production, the deal fell apart after refusal to air the series by the duo due to the fact that the series was intended for too niche of a market, and was not something they were interested in sharing. Following the refusal, the content was aired anyways, and the Israel National Council for the Child criticized the creators, claiming that the series was inappropriate for its intended demographic and featured themes of pedophilia that shouldn't be shown to children, and filed a complaint to the police. The police said that the complaint lacked grounds and that there was no real way to pursue a conviction. In a later interview, both Trager and Paz claimed that the videos were never intended to be broadcast on television, and were created for a small group of people, and the videos were subsequently deleted when they began to gain traction online.

=== YouTube channel ===
After the end of production for Ahmed and Salim, the duo began a YouTube channel for publishing both web series and one-off comedic sketches. On November 9, 2011, they released the music video "The GAG Quartet - le Internet Medley", a medley of songs originating from YouTube videos and various internet memes. The video has been commercially successful and has over 43 million views as of December 2023.

On August 22, 2013, Sugar Zaza released "Director Zero", in which a character named Zero (portrayed by Trager) was introduced as a satire on the Ugly Israeli stereotype (the word zero is used in Hebrew as a synonym for loser). The video garnered hundreds of thousands of views, mostly domestically in Israel. In 2014, the duo launched a crowdfunding campaign on Headstart to produce a feature film based on Zero. The campaign received great support and raised ₪30,000. The rest of the budget was supplemented by Comedy Central Israel, who helped produce it. Movie Zero was broadcast in early 2015 on the channel, and was published a few days later on their YouTube channel, where it has garnered 3 million views as of December 2023.

In 2015, Trager, with help by Paz, began a new YouTube channel and Facebook series called "Megaphone" where he makes jokes about topics such as pride parades, the slut walk, homophobia, and other contemporary topics in Israeli society. In 2018, the two teamed up with Israeli businessman Oded Faran and created a merchandise shop called the "Unnecessary Virtual Store". They began changing the tone of their channel, transitioning from edgier, satirical jokes to a more family-friendly soft and absurdist style of humor, to the dismay of many of their longtime viewers.

In December 2022, the duo, in collaboration with Ron Minis, formed the punk band "Why Am I Alive?", and released their first album, titled "I Wish I Were Dead" alongside the singles "If my phone says 'seen' then why don't you answer?" and "Why do I need to tip if there is already shipping charges?". In March 2023, they began touring. In July 2025 the trio released a second album "Oof" with songs like "HTML is not a programming language", "Mealybug, leave my plant alone", "Things Or [Paz] doesn't eat" and "I don't know if I listen to Punk because I work at Tony Vespa, or I work at Tony Vespa because I listen to Punk".
