= Middle Class Matt =

American adult animated web series

- Genre: Adult animation
- Created by: Adam Lustick
- Written by: Adam Lustick
- Directed by: Chris Bailey
- Voices of: Adam Lustick
- Composer: Mariana Calegari
- Country of origin: United States
- Original language: English
- No. of episodes: 3

Production
- Executive producers: Adam Lustick; Brendan Burch; Wendy Wills; Matt Danner
- Producers: Brendan Burch; Wendy Wills
- Editor: James Rolstone
- Running time: 2–3 minutes
- Production company: Now What

Original release
- Network: YouTube
- Release: December 18, 2024 – present

Middle Class Matt is an American adult animated web series created by Adam Lustick and Produced by Now What, the series debuted on YouTube in 2024.

== Episodes ==
No.	Title	Original release date
1	"Matt vs. The Hedgelords"	December 18, 2024
2	"Matt vs. Childcare"	February 28, 2026
3	"Matt vs. The Wage Gap"	May 23, 2026
