= Bouzebal =

Moroccan cartoon

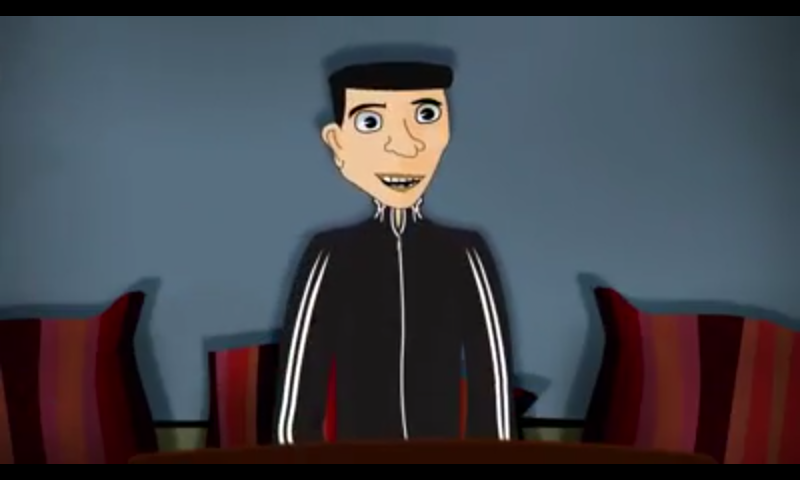
- A Moroccan animated web series
- Created by: Mohammed Nassib
- Original work: Meme
- Owner: Mohammed Nassib
- Years: 2011–present

Films and television
- Web series: Bouzebal (2011–present); Bouya (2016–present)

Miscellaneous
- Software used: Toon Boom Animate Pro 2; Adobe Photoshop; Adobe Illustrator; FL Studio; Samplitude Pro X2; Adobe Premiere Pro CC

Official website
- Official website

Bouzebal (Arabic: بوزبّال) is a Moroccan Rage comic character who is the main character of an animated web series on YouTube. The character, Bouzebal, was created by Mohamed Nassib, in August 2011, after he had the idea to create a webpage for the meme name "Bouzebal". The first animation in the youtube series was released in 2012 and was a great success. It is now the largest meme page in Africa and among the most active pages in Morocco with an average of more than 3 million page views per week.

The Bouzebal comics explore themes of marginality and social exclusion.

== Characters ==
- Bouzebal - A typical, slightly exaggerated, suburban Moroccan adolescent boy. Under-educated, he spends much of his time on the street, dreaming of being a football star. In an attempt to seem higher class, he litters his speech with many malformed French words and phrases.
- Kilimini - Coming from a millionaire family and considered to be very good looking, he is Bouzebal's sworn enemy. Bouzebal says he is "haughty" and his parents are "thieves". He is well educated in French and has been abroad for further education.
- Qriqiba - Disrespectful young man who uses his strength to dominate and scare the inhabitants of the neighborhood, Bouzebal's childhood friend he has a lot of arguments with him. His dream is to become a security guard.
- Qriqiba's mom - A widow of a certain age who is abrupt and stingy and loves gossip. As best she can, she always tries to set a good example and educate her sons.
- Bouzebal's mom - She loves when her son manages to arouse the jealousy of others, but she prefers her youngest child. She forced Bouzebal to become independent so as not to be fooled by others when he grew up and appreciate being given importance.
- Mshrmila - Bouzebal's girlfriend, a rough and suggestible brawler, thinks she can marry him someday. Very smart, she can help her friends solve problems as and when.
- Khozozo - A young man older than the main character addict to marijuana. He never speak, he accompanies Bouzebal and his acolytes in a lot of adventures.
- Bouzebal's dad - Brutal and mediocre, as vulgar as his son, he still manages to feed his family every day.
- Bouzebal's brother - The younger brother of the main character. Immature and manipulative, he likes to look for problems for his big brother. Later, thanks to his intelligence, he will find money to be able to support his father on a daily basis.
- Al-Dalma - Having failed in his studies, he smokes and takes drugs in different ways. Critic and courageous, it is the fury of the young with its large size and its scars due to its many street fights. He is martyring the rich of the city.
- Trio of Mikhiyate - Trio of smokers made of Daraba who threatens and negotiates with the victims, Katala who kills with two large swords even if he does not always need it and Dafana responsible for hiding the bodies.
- Sfaïga - A thief known for his speed, as he could not finish his schooling he committed to steal and assault people at night. Despite his dirty character he can be friendly with his knowledge.
