= Goodwin vs. Badwin =

Adult animated web series

- Genre: Adult animation; Black comedy
- Created by: Joshua Bowen; Peter Burton
- Written by: Joshua Bowen; Peter Burton
- Directed by: Tony Grillo
- Voices of: Ian Covell; Chris Clabo
- Composers: Brent Barkman; Steve Gadsden
- Countries of origin: United States; Canada
- Original language: English
- No. of episodes: 8

Production
- Producer: Joshua Bowen
- Running time: 2–3 minutes
- Production companies: Loogaroo Animation; Mondo Media; Sytle 5

Original release
- Network: YouTube
- Release: January 18 – November 1, 2012

Related
- Mrs. Brickles

Goodwin vs. Badwin is an adult animated web series created by Joshua Bowen & Peter Burton, it co-production with Loogaroo Animation, Sytle 5 and Mondo Media.

== Premise ==
Goodwin vs. Badwin follows the relationship between polar opposite twin brothers, Goodwin (the good twin) and Badwin (the bad twin) from their stint as womb mates to the politically incorrect and surreal adventures they share growing up in the world around them.

== Voice cast ==
=== Main ===
- Ian Covell as Goodwin
- Chris Clabo as Badwin

== Production ==
The series was animated by Loogaroo Animation.

== Episodes ==
No.	Title	Original release date
1	"Premature Evacuation"	January 18, 2012
2	"Hair Moans"	February 2, 2012
3	"Kidney 4 Sale"	February 16, 2012
4	"Mrs. Brickles"	March 1, 2012
5	"The China 4000"	August 24, 2012
6	"The Devil's Playdate"	September 7, 2012
7	"The Golden Crosses"	September 21, 2012
8	"Hide and Seek"	November 1, 2012

== Spin-off ==
Spin-off series Mrs. Brickles aired between June and July 2012.
