= Chuparsky University =

Ukrainian adult animated science fiction sitcom

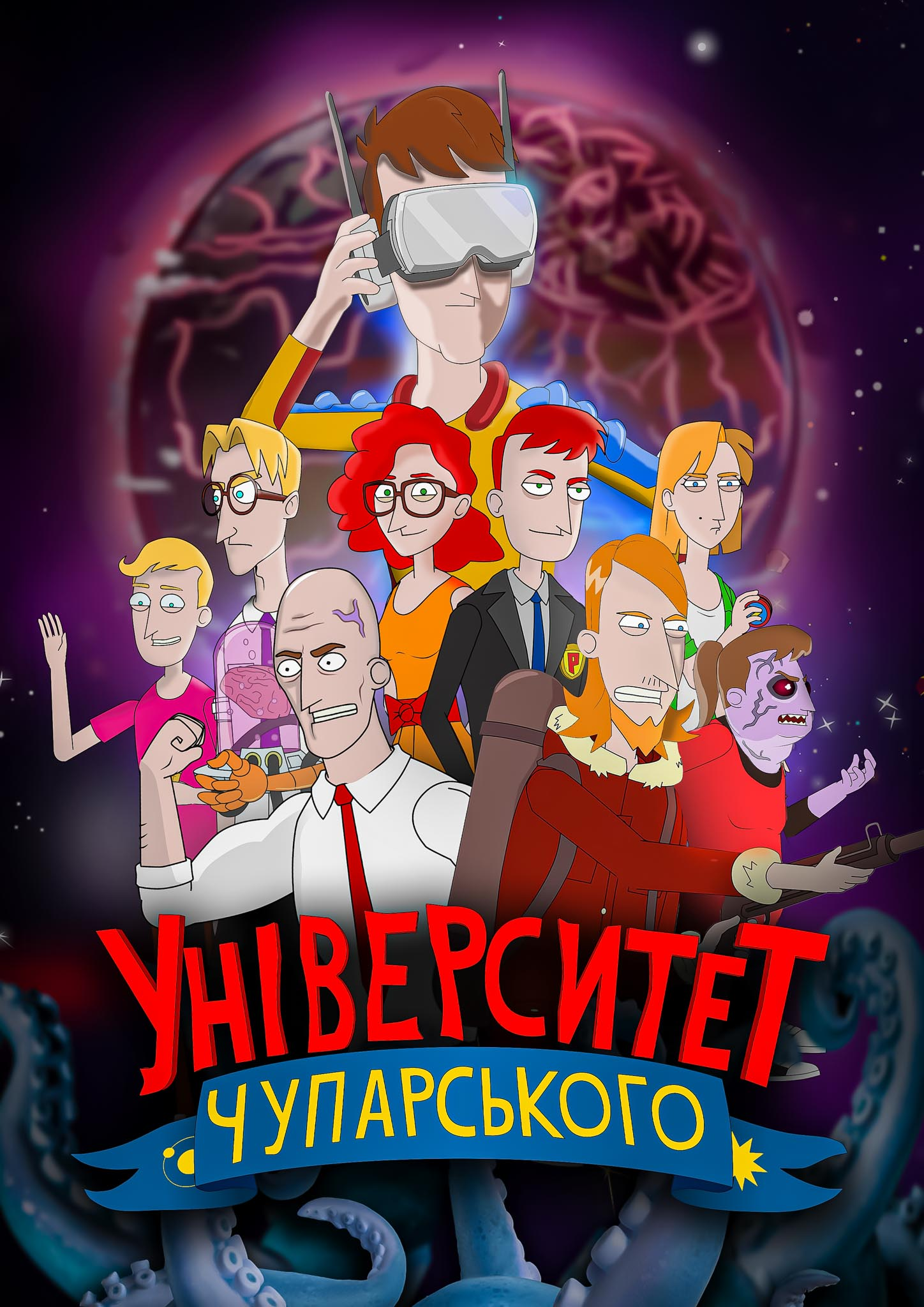
- Ukrainian: Університет Чупарського
- Genre: science fiction, animated sitcom
- Created by: Mykola Semeniuk, Mykhailo Karpan
- Country of origin: Ukraine
- Original language: Ukrainian

Original release
- Network: YouTube
- Release: 22 November 2022 – present

Chuparsky University (Ukrainian: Університет Чупарського, romanized: Universytet Chuparskoho) is a Ukrainian adult independent animated web series created, written, and directed by Mykola Semeniuk and Mykhailo Karpan, two Ukrainian enthusiast animators. The series premiered online on 22 November 2022 and is produced in Ukrainian, with English subtitles available. The series is published on the YouTube channel "Animarody", and a new episode comes out every 2–3 months. As of April 2026, there are 16 episodes in two seasons. The first season was published from 22 November 2022 to 14 September 2024, and the second season started on 9 December 2024.

== Plot ==
The series follows the misadventures of Ostap Chuparsky, Andriy Andrienko, and several other students of the fictional Chuparsky Technical University, who constantly get into trouble after misusing the high-tech gadgets, such as a quantum teleportator, time acceleration engine, or enlargement/reduction device, made by their genius professor Borys Murshteiko. Usually, those devices are locked inside Professor Murshteiko's lab, and the students use them without professors consent and knowledge (and therefore, use them wrong, which causes their misadventures), often motivated by the need to impress a peer of the opposite gender or just by a simple curiosity. The location of the university is never disclosed; however, there are plentiful visual hints that it is located in the city of Ivano-Frankivsk.

The series was inspired by the Rick and Morty franchise and is often nicknamed "Ukrainian Rick and Morty", because it bears many resemblances to the Rick and Morty animated series, such as the presence of a senior genius inventor and younger careless companions, the presence of such science fictional concepts as teleportation, human clones, parallel universes, alternative forms of intelligent life, etc. Also, just like Rick and Morty, it sometimes uses obscene language. Chuparsky University is voiced by the same voice actors who voice the Ukrainian dubbing of Rick and Morty, The Simpsons, and Futurama.

== Main characters ==
Ostap Chuparsky is an average male teenage student who is usually afraid to break the rules and who is critical of the crazy ideas of his best friend, Andriy. He is often dragged into misadventures by Andriy, despite usually foreseeing them in advance and warning about them. He is the grandson of the university founder. At the beginning of the series, he does not know that and thinks that he has the same family name just by coincidence. Andriy Andrienko is the best friend of Ostap, a quite frivolous teenage student, mostly interested in partying and dating. Often breaks rules or does reckless things out of boredom or out of a need to impress a girl. Roma Rudenko is an arrogant and misanthropic millionaire student who despises other students. He never misses an opportunity to boast about his wealth and humiliate anyone he deems poor. He solves any problem he encounters by throwing money at it. He is clearly not interested in education and entered the university only to not be disinherited; therefore, he goes to great lengths to skip classes without consequences. He also started the "Roma Rudenko Club", a sect of his followers, whom he uses for his own purposes, including intrigues and pranks. Alisa is a female student with an active sexual life, in which she is more interested than in studying. She is often dragged into misadventures by her male groupmates, but her wit, courage, and decisiveness usually let her come out on top of it. Babenko is a tomboy, the best friend of Alisa, whom she follows almost everywhere. She treats everything with scepticism and sarcasm, and remains tranquil in any situation. Liutetsiy Murshteiko is a slightly autistic, geeky, and naive student, the son of Professor Murshteiko, who named him after a chemical element. Other students often use him to gain access to the lab of his father. Professor Murshteiko is a genius professor who likes to spend his time developing different advanced high-tech gadgets in his lab, preferring it to giving lectures to students, which is boring for him. Due to an undisclosed accident in the past, he lost his right arm, which was replaced with a multifunctional metal prosthetic arm. This arm contains a whole lot of different tools, from a compass to a grenade launcher. When detached from the rest of the body, this arm exhibits signs of self-consciousness and can act on its own. Professor Yaytsedub is the dean of the Chuparsky University. He is a tough guy and a fierce-tempered man, very well physically developed and excellent in martial arts. He takes his position very seriously and puts maximum effort into maintaining discipline. He is actually a secret government agent, assigned as a dean to conduct oversight over potentially dangerous experiments of Professor Murshteiko and other professors.

== History ==
The series is created by Mykola Semeniuk, a programmer from Ivano-Frankivsk, and Mykhailo Karpan, a sound engineer from Kyiv. Mykola Semeniuk came up with the idea of a series in 2016. After releasing several series, which were later deleted, he took a break and returned to the series in 2020. About that time, Mykola Semeniuk made an acquaintance with Mykhailo Karpan, who decided to join the project. They made several short animated videos featuring characters of "Chuparsky University" and telling about their adventures before entering the university, and also an early pilot episode titled "Bad day club", featuring early models of characters and location.

The first episode was created solely by Mykola Semeniuk, for which he was a screenwriter, an artist, and an animator. After that, the episodes were created in collaboration with Mykola Semeniuk and Mykhailo Karpan. The series is financed by fundraising and by YouTube monetisation.
