= Space Adventure Legend Quest =

American adult animated web series

Space Adventure Legend Quest is an American adult animated web series created by SexualLobster for Machinima. It premiered on January 13, 2013, the series centers on the adventures of a space crew, led by the inept Captain Dreak, who try to find ways to pass the time in the infinite abyss.
