= The Kirlian Frequency =

Argentinian animated webseries

- Created by: Cristian Ponce
- Written by: Cristian Ponce; Hernán Bengoa; Diego Labat
- Directed by: Cristian Ponce
- Voices of: Nicolás Van de Moortele; Casper Uncal; María Dupláa; Letizia Bloisi; Ciro Herce; Milagros Molina; Jorge Alonso
- Composer: Marcelo Cataldo
- Country of origin: Argentina
- Original language: Spanish
- No. of seasons: 2
- No. of episodes: 10

Production
- Running time: 8-10 minutes
- Production companies: Tangram Cine; Decimu Labs

Original release
- Network: YouTube (2017-2018); Vimeo (2017-2018); Netflix (2019-2021); Flixxo
- Release: 30 April 2017 – 2021

The Kirlian Frequency (also known as La Frecuencia Kirlian or Ghost Radio) is an Argentine animated webseries released in 2017 on YouTube and Vimeo and, on 15 February 2019, the first five episodes were exclusively available on Netflix. The series revolves around a radio that broadcasts only at night, in a small town deep inside Buenos Aires Province where all kinds of macabre and supernatural events occur.

== Production ==
Production company Tangram Cine developed an indie-funded live-action pilot in 2009. Although it was heavily promoted on their social sites, its post-production was never finished and the pilot wasn't released. It was written and directed by Cristian Ponce and Pedro Saieg.

During the next eight years, the series mutated into different forms and was submitted to several development contests, either as a TV series project or as a feature film.

In 2015, its creator, Cristian Ponce decided to go back to the project, but this time as an animated series. Teaming up with Hernán Bengoa (with whom he had worked on two seasons of webseries Policompañeros Motorizados), they gave birth to a new incarnation of the project that was now based in a classic anthological structure, in the style of Twilight Zone or Tales from the Crypt, only tied together by the intervention of its main character, The Host. The new version was produced by Tangram Cine and Decimu Labs, and was developed almost in its entirety by a four-person crew: Cristian Ponce (screenwriter, director and animator), Hernán Bengoa (screenwriter and illustrator), Hernán Biasotti (sound designer) and Marcelo Cataldo (original soundtrack). It features voice acting by Nicolás Van de Moortele, Casper Uncal, María Duplaá, Letizia Bloisi, Ciro Herce, Milagros Molina and Jorge Alonso.

The series consists of ten episodes, and the first season originally released once every three months.

== Netflix ==
Halfway through 2018, The Kirlian Frequency virtually disappeared from every video platform and social network. Only at the end of January 2019 was its return announced, this time on Netflix, newly dubbed in English and Portuguese for its international release. It then disappeared once again and has not returned to the site.

== Episodes ==
Series	Episodes	Originally released
1	10	18 February 2019

No. overall	No. in season	Title	Original release date
1	1	"April Nation"	18 February 2019
2	2	"Masters of the Night"	18 February 2019
3	3	"A New Color"	18 February 2019
4	4	"The King of Christmas"	18 February 2019
5	5	"An Old Man and His Dog"	18 February 2019
6	6	"Bilder's Escape"	23 December 2019
7	7	"The Invaders"	31 October 2020
8	8	"Arcade Arcane"	31 October 2020
9	9	"Kirlian 6"	31 October 2021
10	10	"The Silence"	31 October 2021

== Awards ==
The Kirlian Frequency won the award for Best Script for an Animated Webseries at Bawebfest 2018 Festival.
