= Sociedade da Virtude =

- Genre: Animated sitcom
- Created by: Ian SBF; Thobias Daneluz
- Developed by: Ian SBF
- Composer: Ian SBF
- Country of origin: Brazil
- Original language: Portuguese

Production
- Producer: Lorena Nascimento
- Running time: 11 minutes (without commercials)

Original release
- Network: Adult Swim
- Network: YouTube
- Release: 12 May 2017

Sociedade da Virtude (English: Society of Virtue) is a Brazilian animated web series in the style of motion comics launched in 2017 by Ian SBF and illustrator Thobias Daneluz. The series satirizes the superhero universe through the use of sharp humor and social criticism.

The first sketches for the series were produced in late 2016, but it was not launched until May 2017. During the COVID-19 pandemic, the series took a hiatus until 2023 with the debut of Adult Swim as a channel in Brazil.

== Plot ==
The show focuses on different groups of superheroes with unique abilities in the city of Megalópolisville, many of whom are parodies of real comic book superheroes. The cast includes members of the Society of Virtue and R-Men, the enigmatic Red Panther, and the dark Urban Raven. Each of them has their own personality and abilities.

== Characters ==
Society of Virtue
Character	Parody of
Wilson/Big Bang	Superman
Jesse/Majestosa	Wonder Woman
Vigilante Noturno	Batman
Volt	The Flash
Arqueiro	Green Arrow
Juan Marine	Aquaman
Lampyridae	Bumblebee
R-Men
Monóculo	Cyclops
Urso	Beast
Vidro	Colossus
Professor R	Professor X
Querubim	Avenging Angel
Carol	Jean Grey

=== Others ===
The following characters are original creations from the series.

- Panteira Ruiva
- K
- Central
- Jonathan / Flaming Roach
- Samantha
- Corvo Urbano
- Comissário
- Fredick
- Bernard
