= Ginger Snaps (TV series) =

- Genre: Black comedy
- Created by: Sono Patel
- Written by: Sono Patel
- Voices of: Lauren Lapkus; Aparna Nancherla; Cree Summer; Kari Wahlgren; Ashley Tisdale; Maria Bamford; Josh Keaton; Carlos Alazraqui; Benjamin Diskin
- Composer: Quan Yeomans
- Countries of origin: United States; Australia
- Original language: English
- No. of seasons: 1
- No. of episodes: 9

Production
- Executive producers: Sono Patel; Bruce Kane; Judy Whittle
- Producers: Ivan Dixon; Greg Sharp; Patrick Crawley
- Running time: 7-9 minutes
- Production companies: Rubber House; BES Animation; Blue Ribbon Content

Original release
- Network: ABCd
- Release: June 22, 2017

Ginger Snaps is an adult animated sitcom created by Sono Patel. The series premiered on June 22, 2017 on ABCd.

It was not renewed for a second season despite the last episode's cliffhanger ending wherein Kishy and the other Ginger Snaps plan a rebellion against Calista.

== Plot ==
In the middle of a quiet US suburb, a power-hungry preteen dreams of making her cookie-selling troop the most powerful clique. With the moral compass of a film mobster, she is willing to use everything from her family, friends, and even a classmate's terminal cancer diagnosis as leverage in her quest for cookie world domination. Cookies must be sold, and power will be grabbed, no matter the cost.

== Characters ==
- Lauren Lapkus as Calista, a cynical, power-hungry preteen girl and the founder of the Ginger Snaps. Her main goal is to sell cookies and get money from them. She has issues expressing affection for others as refers to her friends as "business partners" and has yet to find a reason as to why she should care about her mother or sister.
- Aparna Nancherla as Kishy, a happy Asian girl who tries to be a Ginger Snap trooper. She is hated by Calista since Kishy is nice to everyone and does a more efficient job than her.
- Cree Summer as Rachel, she is Calista's Black second-in-command. She and Calista used to have a feud but eventually became friends.
- Kari Wahlgren as Jenny and Penny, two creepy twin redheads who are the muscle of the group. They are both skilled in many types of weaponry.
- Ashley Tisdale as Apple, she is the older sister of Calista. She is a cheerleader at school. She loves Calista's cookies and frequently tries to steal them. She and her sister don't seem to really appreciate each other and they both seem to only want to cause harm to each other.
- Josh Keaton as Hemmingway, a boy at Calista's school, whom she has a crush on, but Hemmingway really likes Kishy.
- Maria Bamford as Vivien, Calista and Apple's single mother. She doesn't have a good relationship with Calista and Vivien is seen frequently trying to make a connection with her.
- Benjamin Diskin as Patrick, a football jock and Apple's boyfriend.

== Episodes ==
No. overall	No. in season	Title	Directed by	Original release date
1	1	"Cancer Girl"	Ivan Dixon	June 22, 2017
Calista and Rachel lose their customer when a girl with cancer starts selling her own cookies.
2	2	"Supply and Demand"	Ivan Dixon	June 22, 2017
Kishy is sent to sell cookies at a possible pedophile's house.
3	3	"Blood"	Ivan Dixon	June 22, 2017
The twins try to find out who is stealing their cookies.
4	4	"Fatal-ish Attraction"	Patrick Crawley	June 22, 2017
The story of how Rachel and Calista met.
5	5	"Boy Drama"	Greg Sharp	June 22, 2017
Calista asks Hemmingway to the dance but he's already going with Kishy.
6	6	"Girl Drama"	Greg Sharp	June 22, 2017
Calista sends Jenny and Penny to destroy Kishy, but find out a big secret about her.
7	7	"Camping"	Patrick Crawley	June 22, 2017
After Vivien gets lost, Calista takes charge of the Ginger Snaps' camping trip, but Kishy's plans work out better than hers.
8	8	"School Dance"	Patrick Crawley	June 22, 2017
It's the school dance, and Calista keeps a close eye on Kishy.
9	9	"Initiation"	Greg Sharp	June 22, 2017
Kishy finally becomes a Ginger Snap, but now she has one task to take care of, getting rid of Calista.
