= Action Faction =

American adult animated web series

Action Faction is an American adult animated web series created by Jon Etheridge and Tony Schnur for Machinima. It premiered on January 13, 2013, follow a group of superheroes who must suddenly cope with an unexpected change.
