= Ahmed and Salim =

- Genre: Adult animation Black comedy Blue comedy
- Created by: Or Paz and Tom Trager
- Voices of: Or Paz and Tom Trager
- Country of origin: Israel
- No. of seasons: 2
- No. of episodes: 17

Production
- Running time: 3-7 minutes
- Production company: Sugar Zaza

Original release
- Network: YouTube
- Release: January 20, 2009 – August 24, 2011

Ahmed and Salim is an Israeli adult animated web series created by Or Paz and Tom Trager. The series is a satirical parody on religious fundamentalists, or, as the creators define it: "a sitcom about terrorists."

It debuted on January 20, 2009 and has since become an Internet hit with over 2 million views and worldwide fans.

There was an attempt to adapt the web series into a TV show. The creators produced a 22-minute pilot episode, which is a longer version of the 7th web episode, for the Israeli cable channel Bip on October 19, 2008. The pilot was rejected.

== Creators ==
Tom Trager and Or Paz, AKA Sugar Zaza, are Israeli animators and comedy writers, born in 1988. The two met during a high school film production in 2006. Since then, the two have been producing web sketches (both live-action and animated) in Hebrew, and posting them online.

Most of their productions are independent, and they used to write, story board, animate, edit and voice the characters from an apartment in Herzliya.

== Description ==
The Jerusalem Post describes the show as a "controversial animated series about two clueless characters who surf the Net and bungle terror attacks." The episodes revolve around two nerdy Arabs, Ahmed and Salim, whose father, Yasser, is a fascist anti-Semitic terrorist who wants them to follow in his footsteps, while all they want to do is play video games and surf the internet. The episodes will often feature Yasser sending them on a suicide mission ending with dire consequences to his own people due to Ahmed and Salim's naive and childlike nature.

The Columbus Ledger-Enquirer describes the series as depicting "young Arabs who spend their afternoons trying to bomb Israeli buses, gun down Jewish girls and incinerate crowded cafes".

Trager and Paz claim that although the show might look very anti-Islamic at first, they have no real political agenda other than just "making people laugh". The satire in their show is not aimed at Muslims, but at all the fundamentalists who take religion to an extreme place.

Another of their series, The Shtreimels, pokes fun at ultra orthodox Jews in a similarly crude manner.

=== Language ===
Though the characters have an Arabic accent, actual Arabic is only used occasionally. Some of the most common words during the episode are Fudge and Banana. Ahmed and Salim's language is a combination of gibberish, English, Spanish, French, Italian, Greek, Hebrew, Russian, Ukrainian and Arabic.

=== Running gags ===
Cursing
Ahmed and Salim use American and British slang when cursing. The British slang-word "wanker" is one of their favourite curse words, along with "dicko", "fudge-packer", "butt-burglar", "pussy", "cock-pirate" and "looza" (slang for "loser").

Shooting a wife
Yasser, the father, has a catchphrase, "Jar-fill mousa ya pussy!" ("Shut your mouth, you pussy!"), after which he usually shoots one of his wives without even looking.

Top spin shout
Most episodes end with someone yelling "Ahmed and Salim" in top shot while the camera spins. From Yasser to Habub, a father whose son was thought to have been killed, and even Israel's "Big-Brother" host Erez Tal.

Celebrity References
Often the "language" used by characters in this show substitutes words for other things (e.g.. iPhone=Expensive Shit, Doctor=House). However the most prominent are references to celebrities (e.g. Talentless Shemale Bitch=Lady Gaga, Gay=Elton John, Ass Face=Alec Baldwin, Suicide=Kurt Cobain).[Ahmed and Salim, iPhone 5]

== Popularity ==
According to The Columbus Ledger-Enquirer, the show has a "cult following" in Israel. The debut episode, in which the father "bemoans the fact that his sons haven't gone off on a suicide mission and killed lots of Jews," attracted 600,000 viewers on YouTube.

== Controversy ==
The series includes extreme scenes, which many viewers find offensive. In one of the episodes, Ahmed falls in love with a Jewish girl, who in turn develops a crush on younger brother Salim; their father resolves the conflict by shooting the girl dead. In another episode, which was taken off YouTube following complaints by shocked viewers, the father dreams he has become a "stinking Jewish rabbi" and his sons do what they were taught to do when encountering a Jew, namely shoot him in the testicles.

The show has drawn the critical attention of the Arabic press. The United Arab Emirates has banned Ahmed and Salim. Palestinian bloggers have denounced it.

== See also ==
- Block 13
