= Mort's End =

- Developed by: Alex Valkema
- Written by: Alex Valkema
- Directed by: Alex Valkema
- Starring: Alex Valkema, special guests
- No. of seasons: 3

Original release
- Release: 2009 – 2010

Mort's End is a webseries discovered on Blip.tv which aired between 2009 and 2010. Created by Alex Valkema, the show originally aired its first episode back when it was necessary to download each individual episode. During its two season run, the show has gained a wide cult following among those who visit the website and those who came across the viral marketing.

The programme aired for 3 seasons, with the final season planned to also include a possible musical episode with original songs. A spin-off series was in development involving the adventures of one of its main characters. The show was to be entitled Nick! but was never released, instead with a new series to take the place of the original series called "The Lost Transmissions" also seen at the very same Blip page. The plot follows the same cast of characters as they travel through the multiverse to get Mort back to his time period to stop what caused the last series to end. The final season aired in 2010 and followed the characters back to Mount Pointy Nipple to wed Gloria and Sheffield.

== Plot ==
The story picks up with Mort at the base of a mountain which he has aptly named "Mount Pointy Nipple". Mort, a green faced character with a strange haircut talks directly into the camera filming his whole life after "the event". Suddenly an African American man comes up from behind him. Up until this point, Mort had not seen anyone for years. This new contact is named Sheffield, and his back story starts the entire adventure.

The adventure goes from Mount Pointy Nipple to Sheffield's Home town in "Leesiana" to find his long lost love, Gloria, who he lost before the event occurred after a mix up put them into separate safety houses. So Mort, Sheffield, and Nick, whom they met after leaving their camera behind by accident, all set out for Leesiana where hilarious characters and antics ensue.

In the second season, the adventure continues with Sheffield, Nick, and Mort heading to Europe still in pursuit of Gloria, Sheffield's love. They cross the great wide ocean to finally get to where they believe Gloria to be.

== History ==
The idea of Mort's End came from drawing an image on paint, then attempting to animate by cutting the frames down. When that eventually failed, it turned into more of a Tom Goes to the Mayor type show where the dialogue was most of the humor and when the characters did move from position to position. Made using Windows Movie Maker and the free audio software Audacity (mainly for lowering the pitch of Sheffield's voice), the first season of Mort's End was clunky and poorly drawn. On the second season, Valkema began using Sony Vegas editing software and was able to bring some new editing techniques into the show, but would still mostly remain on the completely improvised dialogue to give the plot to each episode. The third and Final season came along using the same techniques. For "The Lost Transmissions" the format changed a little bit as it was rendered into 720p High-Definition.

.

== Final season ==
The final season aired in 2010 and followed the characters back to Mount Pointy Nipple to wed Gloria and Sheffield.

== Mort's End: The Lost Transmission ==
A few months after the final episode of Mort's End aired. A debate occurred if the show would go on, or if it was completely over. According to the Mort's End Facebook fan page, the series would go off into a new tangent in its new series Mort's End: The Lost Transmissions, which follows the same cast of characters as they travel through the multiverse to get Mort back to his time period to stop what caused the last series to end.

The original air date for the show was to be on June, 7th 2010, but due to some development issues, it was pushed back to an unknown date. The production office had later moved to a new location, and development for new episodes went to a standstill. Although the series had started and went into the first season's 3 episodes before beginning a 3-month hiatus.

== Soundtrack ==
The eclectic selection of music from Mort's End ranges from the very well known to local bands which no one has heard, which involves mostly hard rock and some lighter stuff such as Simon and Garfunkel.

== Episode list ==
Episode	Season 1	Season 2	Season 3
"The Pilot"
#1	"Ain't Got No Pilot"	"A Change of Seasons"	"The Beginning of The End"
#2	"The Second Going"	"The Two's Have It"	"Torgo 2: Electric Boogaloo"
#3	"In the Nick of Time"	"Three's a Crowd, dick"	"Strange Names are Coming"
#4	"On the Road Again Again"	"Mort: The Hands of Fate"	"Bay Watchers"
#5	"Half and Half"	"Strange A-Going's On"	"The Cliche Flashback Episode"
#6	"The Event: Nick's End"	"The Hands of Fate Karaoke Battle"	"The Morning After"
#7	"The Event: Sheffield's End"	"This Ain't No Jesus Fish"	"Episode 6: Part 2"
#8	"The Event: Mort's End"	"No time to Stop and smell the roses, dick"	"Wedding Bells and Shit"
#9	"Seconds Left in the Season"	"So Close, Yet so Creepy"	"Well, We've Made It This Far"
#10	"Season, Finale"	"My Only Friend, The end"	"Je Suis Mort" formerly "Mort's Finale"

Specials
"Mort's End Christmas Spectacular"

== Trivia ==
- Most of the dialogue done on the show is improvised. The only thing scripted is the special guests lines.
- Some of the comical references and homages range from Curb your Enthusiasm to Meat Loaf's I'd Do Anything for Love (But I Won't Do That)
- The character's voices tend to change from time to time.
- Seymour, a dog in the episode "Half and Half" and seen again in the Christmas Special, is Alex's real dog. He also has his own video series.
- The improvised lines can sometimes be messed up, generally these are kept for comedic purposes.
- Using the editing program Sony Vegas, there is some real footage from YouTube. Examples are the fireplace in the Christmas Episode, and what was on the TV in the 9th episode of season 2.
