= Lizzy the Lezzy =

- Genre: Animation; Stand-up comedy
- Created by: Ruth Selwyn
- Original languages: English, German, Spanish and Hebrew

Lizzy the Lezzy is an animated stand-up comedy series about a woman called Lizzy who talks mostly about lesbian interests. The sketches contain graphical sexual material but not graphic imagery.

Lizzy the Lezzy was created in October 2006 by the Israeli cartoonist Ruth Selwyn. This is the first animated stand-up material of its kind, and the videos have had over 4 million views online. The first episode was uploaded to Myspace and was soon spotted by Arlan Hamilton who writes one of the most popular lesbian blogs on the internet. The publicity from Hamilton's article led to The L Word Online suggesting to Selwyn that she make a funny stand-up video about The L Word. Lizzy then made fun of other lesbians and the resulting video was posted on AfterEllen.

In 2007, Logo TV acquired the first ten Lizzy stand-up comedy videos and broadcast them on its gay/lesbian animation show, Alien Boot Camp. Curve magazine included Lizzy in an article entitled "Networking Lesbians", and Lesbians on the Loose International featured Selwyn and Lizzy as well. Lizzy's stand-up "comedy" videos were also covered on The Bilerico Project's "Sunday Funnies" and on Jewcy where she was described as "the funniest lesbian on Myspace".

Lizzy videos were shown in many gay-themed film festivals, such as the 2008 Israeli Gay and Lesbian Film Festival, and the 2008 Lethal Lesbian 3 film event.

== Content ==
Each Lizzy video has a different theme. One has no sound (for deaf people); one has almost no visuals (for blind people) and there are episodes in French, German, Spanish and Hebrew, all of which contain English subtitles. Most of the videos on YouTube now also have closed captions in English and Spanish.

Selwyn decided to make a special Lizzy stand-up video for National Coming Out Day, which was shown on Lovegirls with Lizzy's funny "Coming Out Guide", and was seen by the Human Rights Campaign which subsequently asked her to create a special video for the L Word season five premier parties across the United States. In June 2009, Tegan and Selwyn posted a link to Lizzy's website on their Twitter page.

Lizzy is sometimes joined by her best friend Gary the Gay and they often talk to each other about the problems they have with being homosexuals. Lizzy also has friends called Kate the Straight, Nic the Bi-Chick and Stan the Macho Man, and these characters all appear in a book written and produced by Selwyn entitled Lizzy the Lezzy Gets Laid. The book contains a similar style of humour to the animated cartoons.

== Reception ==
Lizzy's lesbian comedy videos have been seen by more than 2 million people.

In 2015, activists Haneen Maikey and Mikki Stelder criticised the series for "pinkwashing" Israel's treatment of Palestinians, eroticising "colonial power dynamics", and argued that the series offers insight as to how the "Israeli LGBT community advances Israel's Zionist logic".

In late August 2018, the official Lizzy the Lezzy Facebook page was hacked by a troll who uploaded videos and images of transsexual pornography as well as images that contain the word "faggot". The page had over 2 million likes.
