= Annoying Orange =

American animated web series

- Official logo since 2009–2011
- Genre: Surreal humor; Cringe comedy; Black comedy; Toilet humor; Animated sitcom; Satire; Slapstick
- Created by: Dane Boedigheimer
- Showrunner: Dane Boedigheimer
- Written by: Spencer Grove; Dane Boedigheimer; Bob Jennings; Sara Christensen
- Directed by: Dane Boedigheimer; Bob Jennings
- Voices of: Dane Boedigheimer iJustine; Bob Jennings; Kevin Brueck; Aaron Massey; Jess Lizama; Jon Bailey
- Narrated by: Dane Boedigheimer
- Composers: Dane Boedigheimer; Kevin MacLeod
- Country of origin: United States
- Original language: English
- No. of seasons: 18
- No. of episodes: 855 (list of episodes)

Production
- Executive producers: Dane Boedigheimer; Aaron Massey; Kevin Nalty
- Production companies: Daneboe Productions; The Collective (2009–2016); Annoying Orange, Inc. (2012–present)

Original release
- Network: YouTube
- Release: October 9, 2009 – present

Related
- The High Fructose Adventures of Annoying Orange; The Misfortune of Being Ned

Annoying Orange is an American live-action/animated comedy web series created by Dane Boedigheimer (known online as DaneBoe). Set in a world of anthropomorphic food, the series follows its titular character, Orange, who always annoys others by telling crude jokes and puns and making annoying noises until their certain demises. The Annoying Orange YouTube channel has 13.9 million subscribers as of 2026.

The original web series has also expanded to multiple separate series, such as The Adventures of Liam the Leprechaun, The Misfortune of Being Ned, The Marshmallow Show, the television series The High Fructose Adventures of Annoying Orange, and a gaming channel, Annoying Orange Gaming, where they upload Let's Play videos.

The channel uploads biweekly episodes including a variety of mini-series, each dedicated to covering different themes of typical YouTube genre tropes such as Ask Orange, HOW2, The Juice, Foodsplosion, Shocktober, and more. The channel also frequently re-uploads older videos as parts of larger compilations, as seen with their weekly compilation mini-series Saturday Supercut.

== Plot ==
An episode of Annoying Orange from 2014.

The series is centered on Orange, who lives in a house's kitchen with other anthropomorphic food and objects with human faces. The formula for most episodes consists of Orange annoying other characters, hence his title. He can accomplish this by telling jokes and puns, usually punctuated with his signature laugh, burping, breaking wind, repeatedly calling them names or making noises with his mouth. Despite this, he usually means well towards others and tries to keep them safe. At the end of each episode, the targeted character meets a sudden, certain, and gruesome demise, usually being killed and/or mutilated by – most often – a chef's knife. Orange tries to warn them by crying out the weapon-in-use, such as "Knife!".

Orange has recurring mannerisms; he often begins an episode by repeatedly calling for a character's attention until the character responds. He can spit seeds from his mouth and has a passion for flatulence, TNT, kazoos, making noises (such as "nya, nya" and a motorboat engine) and touching his tongue to his eye. He also sometimes refers to the character as something playing on the object's name or appearance (such as calling a grapefruit "Apefruit"). If an object behaves in a way that Orange dislikes, he will often call that object an "apple" (the food equivalent of "asshole").

There are other characters that accompany Orange, such as his irritable and skeptical best friend, Pear (also voiced by Boedigheimer), although he rarely admits it. Other fruits include Passion Fruit, who is commonly associated as Orange's love interest; the arrogant Grapefruit, a tiny but hot-blooded Red Delicious apple known as Midget Apple (though he prefers the name Little Apple), the happy-go-lucky and slightly eccentric Marshmallow who always sees everything filled with enthusiasm, and an elderly lemon named Grandpa Lemon.

In seasons 15–17, an evil, corrupted version of Orange, dubbed Analog Orange, began to take over the channel. Whenever he is nearby, the screen gets an eerie glitch filter and he unleashes chaos in the kitchen. He first appeared in Shocktober 2023 episodes before getting an arc dedicated to him in 2024. It follows Pear and Grapefruit as they travel though Analog's home realm to try and destroy the seven orcruxs – the seven things Orange loves more than anything – in order to save the real Orange, who is trapped in a glass jar by Analog's dark magic, defeat Analog once and for all, and return the kitchen to its former glory. They succeed by the halfway point of season 17, but the kitchen is now inhabited by many clones of Orange with different personalities that were also freed following Analog's defeat.

== Characters ==
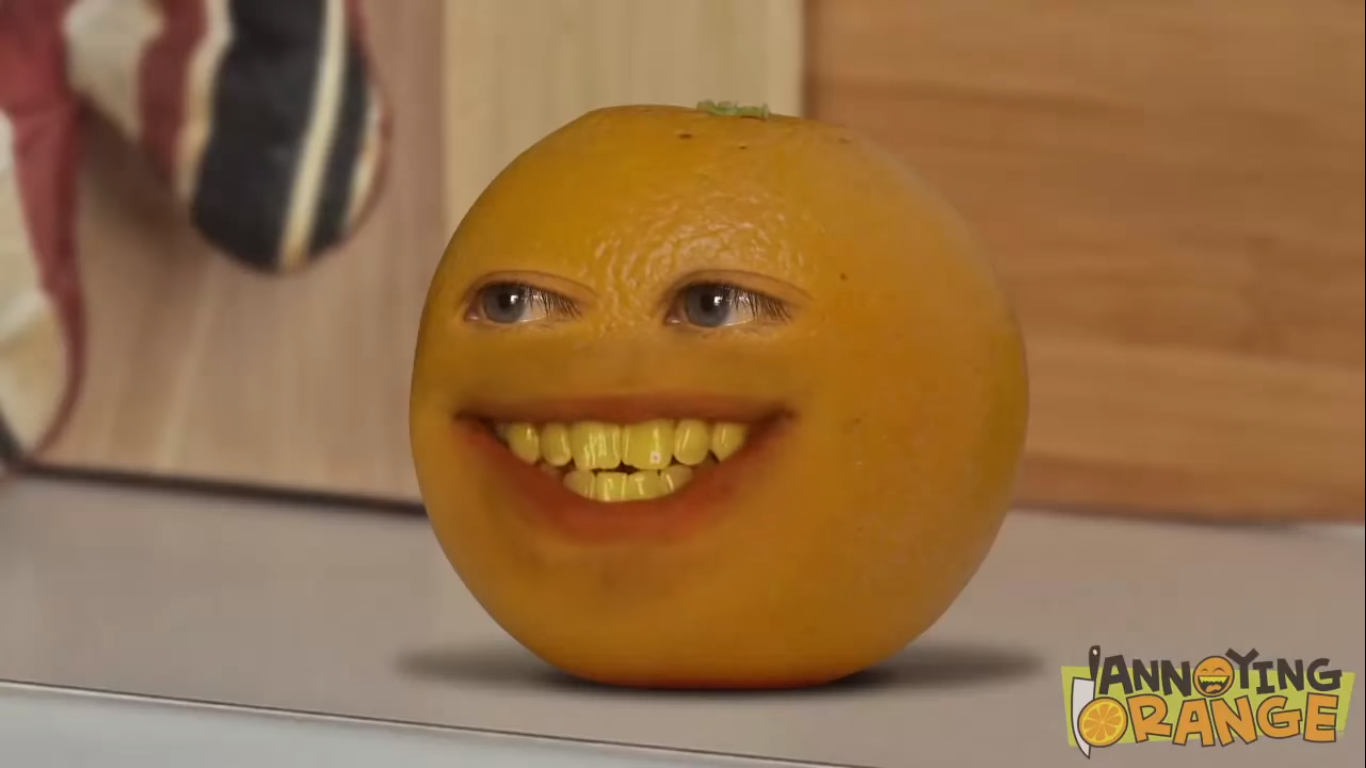
The titular orange.

=== Main ===
- Orange (voiced by Dane Boedigheimer) – An orange and the namesake of the series who tries to find any and every excuse to annoy someone. He can spit seeds from his mouth and has a passion for flatulence, TNT, kazoos, making noises (such as "nya, nya" and a motorboat engine) and touching his tongue to his eye. Orange enjoys making lots of puns and jokes, usually punctuated with his signature laugh. Despite this crude and antisocial behavior, Orange usually means well and is generally good-hearted, trying to warn the other fruits of their imminent demise, while also sticking close to his friends, even though his quirks often drag his friends into all sorts of ridiculous adventures.
- Pear (voiced by Dane Boedigheimer) – A Bartlett pear. The only fruit who puts up with Orange (at least most of the time), serves as the sole voice of reason in the kitchen, and is arguably his best friend, although he rarely admits it. Other foods regard Pear as a bore, owing to his passion for reading; he is often the butt of puns and jokes throughout the series.
- Little Apple (also called Midget Apple) (voiced by Dane Boedigheimer) – A small, grumpy and fittingly short-fused Red Delicious apple who prefers to be called "Little Apple", as he hates the appellation "Midget Apple" for being insensitive to fruits his size, and a running gag was that he will correct anyone who calls him "Midget Apple". He owns a monster truck and is often ridiculed for his height and illiteracy, mostly by Orange, which he constantly denies.
- Marshmallow (voiced by Dane Boedigheimer) – A cute, enthusiastic, eternally upbeat, squeaky-voiced, and cheerful marshmallow who is almost always very happy. They are given to say "Yay!" a lot, have an audacious giggle, and love unicorns (their mother herself is a unicorn), rainbows, cuddly animals, and all things cute. A running gag involved questioning Marshmallow's gender (although they were occasionally referred to by male pronouns in earlier episodes), which they refused to disclose for personal amusement. It was later revealed they were non-binary.
- Passion Fruit (voiced by Justine Ezarik) – A sweet, sassy passion fruit who gets along pretty well with Orange, being one of his closer friends, as well as love interest: Orange has a huge crush on her (although he is embarrassed to show his true feelings towards her), to which she is either completely oblivious or ignorant (most of the time, at least). In 2025, Passion's life was put on the line as she was the final Orcrux Orange had to destroy in order to stop the reign of Analog Orange, but was saved after his defeat.
- Grandpa Lemon (voiced by Kevin Brueck) – An elderly lemon who is the befuddled statesman of the kitchen. He thinks he is everyone's grandfather and has a consistent habit of falling asleep mid-sentence and mishearing words. Despite his old age, he drives a stunt-optimized motorcycle.
- Grapefruit (voiced by Bob Jennings from 2010 to 2021, Jon Bailey since 2021) – A brawny grapefruit who has a short temper – and who others (often Orange) often call fat, much to his displeasure. He has a bodybuilder's personality and likes to think of himself as "large and in charge", often bragging about things he's yet to accomplish or impressing female foods, although he usually fails at this due to his foul luck. He believes he is in a rivalry with Orange for Passion Fruit's affections, but she has no interest in him. Following Jon Bailey's recast as his new voice actor, running gags of him wanting his old voice back and saying "I'm walking here!" due to his New York accent began.

=== Recurring ===
- Apple (usually voiced by Dane Boedigheimer among others) – A feisty and earnest apple that is often the victim of Orange. He tries to give himself peace when he can and gets fed up when anyone – mostly Orange – triggers him. Despite dying from a knife in the first episode, he has reappeared in several later episodes. This is because Apple's not an individual fruit, but rather a set of clones sent to the kitchen one after another after a clone's death.
- Sis (voiced by Jess Lizama) – Orange's equally annoying sister, she was originally only a one-time character, but was turned into a recurring character, likely due to popularity, the noticeable lack of female main characters, and Passion's less frequent appearances in later episodes (Grapefruit even tries to hit on her as well, with little to no avail).
- Corey (voiced by Kevin Brueck) – Midget Apple's literal "half-brother", Corey is a golden delicious apple who managed to survive a knife attack, although losing his backside in the process, which he very frequently talks about or tries to replace in his appearances. He tends to be over-the-top and rather oblivious or dopey at times, since the knife injury also appears to have damaged his brain (including the half of his brain that experiences fear).
- Knife (voiced by Kevin Nalty, later by Dane Boedigheimer, singing voice by Peter Coffin) – A chef's knife who often kills various foods against his will. He is extremely terrified both by the fact that he is used for mutilating food and by a cruel knife sharpener who seems to enjoy Knife's suffering.
- Liam the Leprechaun (portrayed by Bob Jennings) – A short-tempered leprechaun who is always losing his pot of gold, and ever since first encountering Orange, has become among his most bitter enemies. In the episode "Leprechaun Flu", Liam dies after getting a serious case of the Leprechaun Flu, where he burps bunnies, sneezes rainbows, and explodes in coins. As such, and with Bob Jennings' departure from the series in 2021, Liam was retired as a character.
- Zoom, Zip and Zoop (Zoom and Zoop voiced by Bob Jennings, Zip voiced by Aaron Massey) – A trio of highly caffeinated canned energy drinks.
- Squash (voiced by Dane Boedigheimer) – A nervous butternut squash who invariably falls onto various foods by mistake and, to his horror and disgust, crushes them to death. Squash does not intend to hurt anyone and hates it when it happens.
- Copper Lincoln (voiced by Bob Jennings) – A miniature copper Abraham Lincoln statue who enjoys break dancing and was birthed by an ordinary penny after being swallowed and coughed up by a magic oyster. With Bob Jennings' departure from the series in 2021, Copper has been retired as a character.
- Dr. Bananas (voiced by Aaron Massey) – A banana mad scientist whose inventions have been known to be incredible achievements or to have caused certain death. Although sliced by Knife in his debut, he managed to reconnect his two halves with an invention and the side effect that electricity surges through his stitching, although this side effect appears to have gone away in later appearances.
- Nude Dude (voiced by Jack Douglass, later Kevin Brueck) – An apple who became permanently naked after being put into an electric peeler. Some episodes depict him with a censor bar over his groin area, despite him (and all other foods) having no visible genitalia.
- Captain Obvious (voiced by Steve Zaragoza, later Shannon Jones) – A sea captain onion who fittingly always points out the obvious, much to the annoyance of others.
- Lou the Tick (voiced by Michael "Mike 3D" Wingate) – A conspiracy theorist tick who lives in a tinfoil tent, always worrying about aliens possibly taking over the Earth. His name and species are a play on the word "lunatic".
- Baby Orange (voiced by Dane Boedigheimer) – Orange's nosy, disobedient, mischievous baby cousin who is often looked after by the rest of the main cast. Since he is just a baby, he doesn't know what danger lurks around and usually repeats "Why?" whenever someone warns him of it.
- Limburger Cheese (voiced by Rebecca Parham) – A block of stinky limburger cheese and a friend of Sis.
- Gaming Grape (voiced by Shannon Jones) – A grape who loves to play video games, much to the chagrin of his mother and Game Ball, his sports-fanatic older brother. He mostly appears on the Annoying Orange Gaming channel.

== Episodes ==
The first 4 Annoying Orange episodes released from October 9 to December 23, 2009, on the Dane Boe YouTube channel. From 2010 to 2022, the Annoying Orange channel uploaded two or three videos a week. As of late 2023, the channel uploads regular videos biweekly.

Season	Episodes	Originally released	
Season	Episodes	First released	Last released
1	4	October 9, 2009	December 23, 2009
2	54	January 15, 2010	December 24, 2010
3	57	January 7, 2011	December 23, 2011
4	57	January 6, 2012	December 28, 2012
5	77	January 18, 2013	December 30, 2013
6	54	January 3, 2014	December 26, 2014
7	61	January 2, 2015	December 25, 2015
8	53	January 1, 2016	December 30, 2016
9	53	January 6, 2017	December 29, 2017
10	55	January 5, 2018	December 28, 2018
11	60	January 5, 2019	December 27, 2019
12	61	January 3, 2020	December 25, 2020
13	53	January 1, 2021	December 31, 2021
14	51	January 7, 2022	December 30, 2022
15	39	January 6, 2023	December 25, 2023
16	30	January 5, 2024	December 20, 2024
17	24	January 10, 2025	December 26, 2025
18	TBA	January 2, 2026	present

== Conception ==
Before Annoying Orange, Boedigheimer had done many talking food videos for their (Note: Boedigheimer is transgender and uses she/her and they/them pronouns.) channel and other sites including JibJab. They said in an interview that the idea for The Annoying Orange was a combination of the talking food videos, puns and special effects they came up with and did before. The original video was planned to be titled The Annoying Apple, but when they started animating the video, they found it easier to put features on orange than an apple and make it clearer. The first Annoying Orange video initially was meant to be the only one, but due to his popularity, Boedigheimer decided to make more videos and eventually turn Annoying Orange into a full-time series. They created a YouTube channel dedicated to the franchise under the same name on 11 January 2010.

== Reception ==
The series was rated as the most viewed web series of February and March 2010 by Mashable, with over 52 million views. In April 2010, the series had amassed over 100 million views on YouTube. By August, it had received 1 million subscribers. In June 2011, the channel was ranked as the eighth most subscribed and 30th most viewed, with more than 2,000,000 subscribers. On 13 January 2012, the series hit 1 billion channel views and 2.3 million subscribers. The Annoying Orange YouTube channel currently has over 13 million subscribers and 9 billion views.

Despite the popularity of the web series with sections of the public, it has received generally unsavory, critical reviews, many citing its rude humor, obnoxious characters and poor special effects. Liz Shannon Miller considered the show to be "annoying for many reasons". In the web series column Pass the Mustard, Ned Hepburn called the show "pure, pure unfunny, highly concentrated, in droplet form, just purely nonsensical riffing from an Annoying Orange." Hepburn concluded, "the Annoying Orange series is one of the few that I had a physically bad reaction to. It was horrible." 411mania.com called the show "idiotic" and "creepy as hell", while other publications have referred to it as "third grade humor."

In 2014, the Annoying Orange YouTube channel was listed on New Media Rockstars Top 100 Channels, ranked at #32.

=== Lawsuit ===
The success of the series received attention from H2M, a Fargo, North Dakota advertising agency, which in 2006 created its own "talking orange" character to be the spokesman for a North Dakota Department of Transportation ad campaign. Both characters were anthropomorphic oranges with ties to the Fargo-Moorhead area. The Annoying Orange was looked into by H2M's attorneys as an intellectual property matter. Boedigheimer stated they had not watched H2M's talking orange videos before being informed about the disagreement, and also believed that the characters were not very similar. Boedigheimer and Grove were later sued by H2M in May 2013 for allegedly copying the character. The case was dismissed with prejudice 6 April 2015 by Chief Judge Ralph R. Erickson.

=== Pay withdrawal lawsuit ===
On 23 December 2014, Dane Boedigheimer announced that The Annoying Orange had not been funded by Collective Digital Studios since that November. This led her to take legal action to get paid.

== Merchandise and media ==
=== Collective merchandise ===
From late 2011 to 2015, The Collective produced many accessories, toys and clothing with toymaker The Bridge Direct and clothing retailers such as JCPenney, Shopko and rue21. The Collective also announced a partnership in December of that year with costume manufacturer Rubie's Costume Company to produce children and adult Halloween costumes and accessories featuring characters such as Orange, Pear, Marshmallow, and Midget Apple from the web series.

=== Plushies ===
In 2020, Annoying Orange partnered with Warren James, LLC and has produced memory-foam plushie toys depicting every major character. The inventory of plush toys includes Orange, Pear, Midget Apple, Marshmallow, Grandpa Lemon, Grapefruit, and Passion Fruit. The toys can be purchased on the official website individually, or in a bundle of seven.

=== Comics ===
A series of Annoying Orange comics were published by Papercutz.

1. Secret Agent Orange (11 December 2012) – Reference to James Bond.
2. Orange You Glad You're Not Me? (28 May 2013) – This is a reference to the joke that ends in the punchline orange you glad... ? and has other endings depending on the joke, like "that I didn't say 'apple'?".
3. Pulped Fiction (27 August 2013) – Parody of Pulp Fiction.
4. Tales of the Crisper (14 January 2014) – Parody of Tales from the Crypt.
5. Transfarmers: Food Processors in Disguise (8 April 2014) – Parody of Transformers.
6. My Little Baloney (5 August 2014) – Parody of My Little Pony.

=== Television series ===
Because of its rising popularity, a television adaptation of The Annoying Orange was greenlit for Cartoon Network in 2010, completed under the name The High Fructose Adventures of Annoying Orange. It ran from 2012 to 2014 with two seasons and a total of 60 episodes. The show was produced by Boedigheimer, Conrad Vernon and Tom Sheppard, co-executive-produced by Spencer Grove, Kevin Brueck, Robert Jennings and Aaron Massey, and produced with Gary Binkow, Michael Green and Dan Weinstein.

=== Advertising ===
In October 2026, The Annoying Orange was featured in advertisements alongside other internet memes as part of an ad campaign for Mozilla Firefox.

== Video games ==
=== Carnage ===
A video game developed by Bottle Rocket Apps under the name Kitchen Carnage was released for the iPod Touch and iPhone on 7 April 2011. The game was later released in HD for the iPad on 6 May 2011, and for Android devices on 14 October 2011. The Christmas version of the game was released in December 2011 and the free version of the game, Kitchen Carnage Lite, was released 2 March 2012, the game was delisted from the App Store and Google Play Store in October 2023, along with Splatter Up and Skewerz.

The game aims to throw different items across the kitchen into a series of blenders before the time runs out. The player is given apples and bananas at the start. When the second level is reached, tomatoes (replaced by baseballs for the 64-bit version) are added. Level 3 adds cantaloupes, level 4 pineapples, level 5 strawberries and level 6 adds Fred FiggleCorns. Kitchen Carnage was renamed to Carnage in 2021.

=== Splatter Up ===
Annoying Orange: Splatter Up is the second game by the Annoying Orange, after Carnage. The game is based on baseball, and the player slides a finger while a fruit enters the home plate. The faster the player slides, the farther he gets. The game sprites are the same as the Carnage game, the only one that does not appear in this game but appear in Carnage is Fred Figglecorn.

=== Skewerz ===
Skewerz is the most recent Annoying Orange game. The player is given fruits and vegetables to collect, and needs to catch them in the skewer. When collected, the player can send them to a blender called the Froomba.

== See also ==
- Syncro-Vox, a low-cost animation technique that has been used in the series
- Dane Boedigheimer, the creator of the series

== Notes ==
Achievements
Preceded by MysteryGuitarMan	Most Subscribed Channel on YouTube; Ranked 8th as of April 2011	Succeeded by CollegeHumor
