= Jun Suemi =

Japanese illustrator

- Born: 1959 (age 66–67); Ōita, Ōita, Japan
- Occupation: Video game illustrator
- Known for: Illustrator of several video games

Jun Suemi (末弥純 Suemi Jun, born 1959) is a Japanese illustrator, born in Ōita, Ōita, Japan.

== Illustration works ==
He has provided artwork, including monster design and graphic design, for various video games, fantasy and science-fiction books, the Guin Saga novel series written by Kaoru Kurimoto and the Kerberos Panzer Jäger radio drama by Mamoru Oshii.

=== Video games ===
- 聖拳アチョー (MSX) [1985] – Cover Art (Japanese Ver.)
- Dungeon Master (MSX) [1986] – Cover Art
- Silpheed (PC-88, Sega Mega CD) [1986/1993] – Cover Art (Japanese Ver.)
- Fire Hawk: Thexder - The Second Contact (MSX, PC-88) [1989] – Cover Art
- Veigues: Tactical Gladiator (PC-88, PC Engine) [1990] – Cover Art (Japanese Ver.)
- Brandish 2 The Planet Buster (PC-98, Super Famicom) [1993/1995] – Cover Art
- Brandish 3 Spirit of Balcan (PC-98) [1994] – Cover Art
- The Hybrid Front (Sega Mega Drive, Virtual Console) [1994] – Cover Art, Manual Illustrations
- Nosferatu (Super Famicom, Super NES) [1994/1995] – Cover Art
- First Queen IV ～バルシア戦記～ (PC-98, PlayStation, Windows 98) [1994/1996] – Cover Art
- Brandish Renewal (PC-98) [1995] – Cover Art
- Brandish 2 The Planet Buster Renewal (PC-98) [1995] – Cover Art
- Brandish 3 Spirit of Balcan Renewal (PC-98) [1995] – Cover Art
- Dark Seraphim (PC-98) [1995] – Cover Art
- Renny Blaster (PC Engine) [1995] – Cover Art
- Brandish 2 The Planet Buster Expert (Super Famicom) [1996] – Cover Art
- Brandish VT (PC-98) [1996] – Cover Art
- Not Treasure Hunter (PlayStation) [1996] – Cover Art
- Asuncia (PlayStation) [1997] – Cover Art
- Front Mission 2 (PlayStation) [1997] – Character Designer
- Brandish 4 眠れる神の塔 (Windows 95, Windows 98) [1998] – Cover Art
- Wizardry Llylgamyn Saga (Windows 95, Windows 98, PlayStation, Sega Saturn) [1999] – Cover Art
- Wizardry New Age of LLylgamyn (PlayStation) [1999] – Cover Art
- Zill O'll (PlayStation) [1999] – Cover Art, Character Designer
- Apsaras (Windows 98, Windows XP) [2000] – Cover Art, Character Designer
- Zill O'll Infinite (PlayStation 2) [2005] – Cover Art, Character Designer
- Rengoku: The Tower of Purgatory (PlayStation Portable) [2005] – Cover Art
- Rengoku II: The Stairway to H.E.A.V.E.N (PlayStation Portable) [2006] – Cover Art
- Over G: Energy Airforce (Xbox 360) [2006] – Character Designer
- 戦国絵札遊戯 不如帰 -Hototogisu- 乱 (PlayStation Portable) [2008] – Cover Art
- Zill O'll Infinite Plus (PlayStation Portable) [2009] – Cover Art, Character Designer
- Brandish: The Dark Revenant (PlayStation Portable) [2009] – Cover Art
- Trinity: Zill O'll Zero (PlayStation 3) [2010/2011] – Character Designer
- Fire Emblem: Three Houses (Nintendo Switch) [2019] – Promotional Art
