= List of rotoscoped works =

A list of works that were produced using rotoscoping.

== Animated films ==
- Fleischer Studios
  - Out of the Inkwell (1918 - 1929)
  - Minnie the Moocher (1932) - short (the dancing walrus rotoscoped from Cab Calloway dancing)
  - The Old Man of the Mountain (1933) - short (the dancing Old Man rotoscoped from Cab Calloway dancing)
  - Snow White (1933) - short (the singing Koko the Clown rotoscoped from Cab Calloway dancing)
  - Sally Swing (1938) - short
  - Gulliver's Travels (1939)
  - Superman shorts (1941 - 1943)
  - Mr. Bug Goes to Town (1941)
- Walt Disney Animation Studios
  - The Goddess of Spring (1934) - short (Persephone)
  - Snow White and the Seven Dwarfs (1937)
  - Pinocchio (1940) - (Blue Fairy)
  - Fantasia (1940)
  - Bambi (1942)
  - Make Mine Music (1946) - Two Silhouettes segment
  - Cinderella (1950)
  - Alice in Wonderland (1951)
  - Dude Duck (1951) - short (The pretty cowgirls)
  - Hello Aloha (1952) - short (The dancing Hula Girl)
  - Peter Pan (1953)
  - Lady and the Tramp (1955) - (human characters)
  - Sleeping Beauty (1959)
  - One Hundred and One Dalmatians (1961)
  - The Sword in the Stone (1963)
  - The Jungle Book (1967)
  - The Aristocats (1970)
  - Robin Hood (1973)
  - The Many Adventures of Winnie the Pooh (1977)
  - The Rescuers (1977)
  - The Small One (1978) - short
  - The Fox and the Hound (1981)
  - The Black Cauldron (1985)
  - A Goofy Movie (1995)
  - Pocahontas (1995)
  - Fantasia 2000 (1999)
- Don Bluth
  - The Secret of NIMH (1982) - (human characters)
  - An American Tail (1986) - (human characters)
  - All Dogs Go to Heaven (1989)
  - Rock-a-Doodle (1991)
  - Thumbelina (1994)
  - A Troll in Central Park (1994)
  - The Pebble and the Penguin (1995)
  - Anastasia (1997)
  - Bartok the Magnificent (1999)
  - Titan A.E. (2000)
- Ralph Bakshi
  - Wizards (1977)
  - The Lord of the Rings (1978)
  - American Pop (1981)
  - Hey Good Lookin' (1982)
  - Fire & Ice (1983)
- Other
  - The Adventures of Pinocchio
  - Alois Nebel
  - Apollo 10 1/2 (characters and archival footage)
  - The Arrow Flies in the Tale - short
  - The Brave Man's Heart - short
  - Brothers Lyu - short
  - The Case of Hana & Alice
  - Cross Country Detours - short (The deer, crying bobcat and shedding lizard)
  - A Christmas Carol
  - Chico & Rita
  - The Cow's Husband - short
  - Daffy - The Commando - short (Adolf Hitler)
  - Earthlink Sucks - short
  - The Even More Funtrip - short
  - Fard - short
  - The Adventures of Tintin
  - Felix the Cat: The Movie
  - Fellow-Friends - short
  - The Flower with Seven Colors - short
  - The Frog Princess
  - Geese-Swans - short
  - Germania Wurst - short
  - The Girl Who Leapt Through Time
  - The Golden Antelope
  - Grasshopper - short
  - Have a Nice Day
  - Heavy Metal
  - How People Got Fire - short
  - The Humpbacked Horse
  - I Lost My Body
  - I Love You - short
  - Jack Frost - short (The singing scarecrow)
  - Kashtanka
  - Kid's Story (The Animatrix short)
  - Welcome to Irabu's Office
  - The Legend about the Moor's Testament
  - Life is Cool
  - Little Boy Blue - short (The dancing scarecrow)
  - A Lively Market Garden - short
  - A Letter To Colleen
  - Loving Vincent
  - The Magic Bird - short
  - The Magic Shop - short
  - A Magical Treasure - short
  - Mashenka's Concert - short
  - A Miraculous Bell - short
  - Moidodir - short
  - The Night Before Christmas
  - Nobunaga Concerto
  - Nope
  - The Oak-Tree Thrower - short
  - The Old Oak-Trees Tale - short
  - Olimpia
  - Once Upon a Time in the Woods - short
  - The Peasants (2023 film)
  - Peace on Earth - short
  - Piercing I
  - Portraits de Voyages
  - Princess Iron Fan
  - Przygody Kubusia - short
  - Puzzle 3D - short
  - Renaissance
  - Rock & Rule
  - Sarmiko - short
  - A Scanner Darkly
  - The Scarlet Flower
  - Sister Alenushka and Brother Ivanushka - short
  - Snack and Drink - short
  - The Snow Maiden
  - The Snow Queen
  - The Spine of Night
  - The Straw Bull-Calf - short
  - The Sturdy Fellow - short
  - Taiga Tale - short
  - The Tale about the Dead Tsarevna and Seven Bogatyrs - short
  - The Tale about the Soldiers - short
  - The Tale of the Fisherman and the Fish - short
  - Tehran Taboo
  - Thugs with Dirty Mugs - short (The audience member who's silhouetted directly against the movie-screen)
  - Three Bags with Tricks - short
  - The Tin Soldier (1989) - short
  - The Twelve Brothers-Month
  - Undone (TV series)
  - Verlioka - short
  - Waking Life
  - A Walnut Switch - short
  - When The New Year Trees Lights Up
  - Why Can't We Walk Straight - short
  - Yard - short
  - Year of the Fish
  - The Yellow Stork - short
  - Yellow Submarine

== Live action films ==
- The Adventures of Hercules (fight between Hercules and Minos)
- The Birds
- Brenda Starr (comic strip sequences)
- Bride of Frankenstein (The homunculus scene)
- Cool World
- Chopping Mall (laser effects)
- Demon Wind (hand rotoscoped demonic effects throughout)
- A Fistful of Dollars (title sequence)
- Ghostbusters (to isolate elements for compositing)
- The Good, the Bad and the Ugly (title sequence)
- Guardians of the Galaxy (Rocket Raccoon was created by rotoscoping Oreo, a tame raccoon)
- Harry and the Hendersons (scenes from the film are rotoscoped for the end credits)
- The Inglorious Bastards (title sequence)
- Juno (title sequence)
- The Last Waltz (cocaine under Neil Young's nose was rotoscoped out in post-production)
- The Lord of the Rings film trilogy (For the character Gollum, rotoscoping live action shots with keyframe computer animation and motion capture)
- Sin City
- Spaceballs (schwartz-saber effects)
- Speed Racer (Many of the night race sequences involved rotoscoping the computer generated background scenes for a more non-realistic look)
- Star Wars Trilogy (lightsaber effects)
- Tower (combination of rotoscoped action, live & historical footage)
- Tron (combination of computer animation and live action)
- Who Framed Roger Rabbit (combination of traditional animation and live action)

== Video games ==
- Another World
- Batman Forever
- Blackthorne
- Commander Blood
- Dragon's Lair (NES version only)
- Dragon's Lair II: Time Warp (only used for the time machine)
- FAITH: The Unholy Trinity (Only used for the cutscenes)
- Flashback: The Quest for Identity
- "Heavenly Star", by Genki Rockets, as featured in the PSP game Lumines II
- Hotel Dusk: Room 215
- King's Quest VI: Heir Today, Gone Tomorrow
- Last Window: The Secret of Cape West
- Joy Mech Fight
- Just Dance
- Karateka
- The Last Express
- Lester the Unlikely
- Mortal Kombat (in early games in the series)
- Nosferatu
- Prince of Persia
- Project Firestart
- Space Ace (only used for Ace's spaceship "Star Pac", his motorcycle, and the tunnel in the game's dogfight sequence)
- Shaq Fu
- Star Wars: Dark Forces (Only used for the animations of Darth Vader)
- Street Fighter III: 3rd Strike (Only used for the animations of the capoeira character Elena)
- The Banner Saga
- Wing Commander II (Only used for the kiss scene between Blair and Angel)

== Music videos ==
- "21st Century Breakdown" by Green Day
- "Baby I'm Yours" by Breakbot
- "Bedshaped" by Keane
- "Breaking the Habit" by Linkin Park
- "Brothers in Arms" by Dire Straits
- "Calling All Girls" by Hilly Michaels
- "Destiny" by Zero 7
- "Drive" by Incubus
- "Eres" by Café Tacvba
- "Fell in Love with a Girl" by The White Stripes
- "Forsaken by Dream Theater
- "Frijolero" by Molotov
- "Frontline" by Pillar
- "Go with the Flow" by Queens of the Stone Age
- "Innuendo" by Queen
- "The Kids Aren't Alright" by The Offspring
- "Lemonade" by The Bawdies
- "Let It Slide" by Joanna Pacitti
- "Like to Get to Know You Well" by Howard Jones
- "Lone Digger" by Caravan Palace
- "Luv Your Life" by Silverchair
- "Momma's Boy" by Chromeo
- "Money for Nothing" by Dire Straits
- "No More Lies" by The Moody Blues
- "Opposites Attract" by Paula Abdul
- "Shadrach" by Beastie Boys
- "Shoot the Runner" by Kasabian
- "Take On Me", "Train of Thought", and "The Sun Always Shines On TV" by A-ha
- "Ten Thousand Strong" by Iced Earth
- "Tom Waits for No One" by Tom Waits
- "Toshishun" by Ningen Isu
- "Uno, Dos, Tres" by Motel
- "Heartless" By Kanye West
- "Wash In The Rain" by The Bees
- "What You Need" and "Need You Tonight" by INXS
- "You Got Me Up" by Jamie Lidell
- "You Know I Love You, Don't You" by Howard Jones
- "Bad Kids to the Back" by Snarky Puppy

== Television shows ==
- The Aquabats! Super Show! (segment in episode "The Return of The Aquabats!") (2013)
- Blackstar
- Carole & Tuesday
- Codefellas
- Delta State
- Dream Corp, LLC
- Doin' The Thin Thing from A Little Curious (1998)
- Easy For You! from A Little Curious (1999)
- Flowers of Evil
- Girl's High (ending animation sequences)
- He-Man and the Masters of the Universe
- It's Flashbeagle, Charlie Brown (dance club scenes)
- Josie and the Pussycats (band's performance sequences)
- Jem (intro)
- John Henry: The Steel Driving Man (A Tale from the United States of America) from Animated Tales of the World
- Kowabon
- The Lone Ranger (Filmation 1980)
- The New Adventures of Flash Gordon
- The New Adventures of Batman
- The New Adventures of Zorro (Filmation 1981)
- Rocket Launch from Sesame Street Pilot (1969)
- She's a Good Skate, Charlie Brown (figure skating scenes)
- Skyland
- Smiling Friends (S02 E05)
- Space Sentinels
- Sport Billy
- Tarzan, Lord of the Jungle
- Tarzan/Batman and the Super 7
- Undone
- What Have We Learned, Charlie Brown? (portions)

== Commercials ==
- Bubble Tape (1989)
- Fruit Wrinkles (1980s)
- Toyota Supra (1986)
- Nickelodeon IDs: Mengarie, Bicycles and Skating (1989)
- Charles Schwab (2008)
- Akbank (2010–2011)

== Comics ==
- The DaneMen (2005-2017)
