= Genwi =

American mobile content aggregation company

GENWI is a privately held technology company based in San Jose, CA that provides a mobile content enablement platform. GENWI is short for "Generation Wireless".

== History ==
GENWI was a free web-based news reader, or aggregator, initially released in March 2007. Genwi provided a news feed service by enabling users to publish their feeds to one profile and follow others' news feeds in the feed reader – this feed reader was called "Wire" and was capable of reading RSS, Media RSS, iTunes RSS and ATOM feeds. Genwi offered a suite of social networking features built into the RSS reader. Users were able to add friends, send messages, leave comments and share individual feed items. The site underwent a major redesign in November 2008 and was shut down in 2009.

In January 2010, GENWI, Inc. used the same technology that built their RSS reader to launch iSites.us, a smartphone app builder and management system, which enables businesses to build applications for iPhone and Android using RSS, ATOM or social feeds. GENWI uses cloud-based technology to keep more than 1,500 native apps up-to-date and to instantly build HTML5 apps for iPhone.

In September 2011, GENWI launched Condé Nast's "The Daily W" app and rebranded the iSites brand back to GENWI and now helps publishers and brands create engaging native and HTML5 apps with a cloud-based mobile content management system, or mCMS.

== See also ==
- Enterprise mobile application
- Mobile commerce
