= Codefellas =

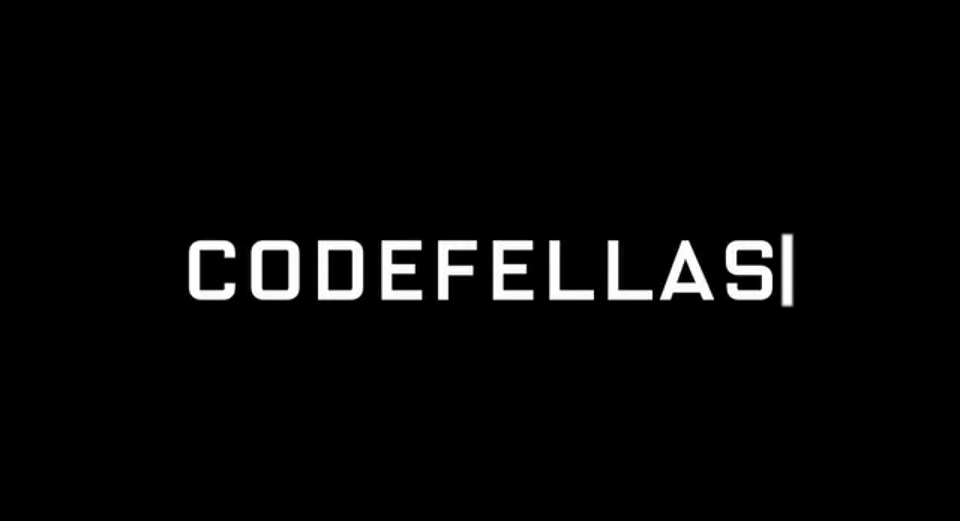
- Genre: Political satire
- Created by: David Rees; Brian Spinks
- Starring: Emily Heller; John Hodgman
- Country of origin: United States
- Original language: English
- No. of seasons: 1
- No. of episodes: 12

Production
- Executive producer: Robert Green

Original release
- Release: June 21 – December 10, 2013

Codefellas is an American animated political satire web series starring Emily Heller and John Hodgman distributed by Wired magazine. It was created by David Rees and Brian Spinks from an idea by Robert Green.

== Background ==
On June 6, 2013, former NSA contractor Edward Snowden leaked the existence of PRISM, an electronic surveillance program intended to monitor e-mail and phone call activity in the United States to identify possible terrorist threats, to the newspapers The Guardian and The Washington Post.

Condé Nast Publications, who produces Wired magazine, said Codefellas would provide "comedic relief in light of current events dominating the national news cycle." After Wired joined Condé Nast's Digital Video Network, five original web series were announced for Wired's video channel including Codefellas and Mister Know-It-All. Codefellas is Wired's first scripted series.

== Production ==
Codefellas was scripted by Get Your War On cartoonist David Rees and Brian Spinks, who produced Get Your War On for The Huffington Post.

Flat Black Films, the animation and software company who worked on the Richard Linklater films Waking Life and A Scanner Darkly, worked on the rotoscoping and lipsyncing.

Twelve episodes of Codefellas were planned and produced.

The first episode, "When Topple Met Winters", premiered on June 21, 2013.

The second episode, "Meet Big Data", premiered on June 26, 2013.

The third episode, "How to Hack a Website", premiered on July 10, 2013.

The fourth episode, "The AntiSocial Network", premiered on July 17, 2013.

The fifth episode, "Spy vs. Spy", premiered on July 24, 2013.

The sixth episode, "Blackmail at 4:20", premiered on July 31, 2013.

The seventh episode, "25 Reasons the NSA Should Hire Buzzfeed Staffers", premiered on August 14, 2013.

The eighth episode, "How to Kill Your Boss", premiered on August 21, 2013.

The ninth episode, "How to Hack a Telegram", premiered on August 28, 2013.

The tenth episode, "How to Cheat to Win", premiered on September 4, 2013.

The eleventh episode, "Shout to All My Lost Spies", premiered on September 11, 2013.

The twelfth episode, "The Cougar Lies with Spanish Moss", premiered on September 18, 2013.

== Story ==
In the first episode, "When Topple Met Winters", protégé hacker Nicole Winters (Emily Heller) who works for "Special Projects", an electronic surveillance governmental agency, receives a call from elderly Special Agent Henry Topple (John Hodgman) informing her that she has just been assigned to him to spy on the general public.

In the second episode, "Meet Big Data", Agent Topple checks up on how Winters is settling into her new job at "Special Projects". Topple asks Winters about her surveillance of e-mails and in turn reveals his lack of understanding with modern computing. The conversation then trails off into the secret history of how fake mustaches were involved with the United States' national security.

In the third episode, "How to Hack a Website", Agent Topple instructs Winters to hack a website. It is revealed that Topple merely used Winters's hacking expertise to remember the password to his old GeoCities e-mail. After Topple asks what e-mails are in his inbox, Winters finds an urgent message from 1998 on a secret project involving Topple's past partner Logan and a "test subject".

In the fourth episode, "The AntiSocial Network", Agent Topple calls Winters about a supposed alert from PRISM on a cyberterrorist group called "Evite" infiltrating their networks and a subsequent attack. In the course of conversation, it is revealed that it is only an invitation from Topple's co-worker Doug for his retirement party described as a "big blow-out." Blaming the terror alert from PRISM on boredom, Winters brings up Facebook, a social network. Topple then calls Facebook "the smartest way to keep people dumb since we started fluoridating the water." Winters then admonishes Topple for having her to have to fill out a "88-J" incident form because of revealing classified information so candidly. Since "88-J" incident forms are only filled out by supervisors, Topple realizes Winters was promoted to become Topple's superior.

In the fifth episode, "Spy vs. Spy", Winters calls Topple back since she was busy with a briefing. As Topple was not invited to the meeting, he passed the time watching telenovelas. Winters complains about his unprofessionalism and reveals that she had not slept well because of a list of troubles the night before. It turns out that the troubles were all perpetrated by Topple's ability to use national security at his disposal as he is still upset over Winters's recent promotion.

In the sixth episode, "Blackmail at 4:20", Topple finds his personal accounts with Walgreens, Amtrak, MCI, and so forth have been hacked because of Winters. In retaliation, Topple orders a "toilet water sample" and finds that Winters is a drug user, which is grounds for termination. Coming to a compromise, Winters discloses to Topple her secret project: stopping a North Korean computer virus. Per their agreement, Topple gets to collaborate with Winters on the secret project as well as getting full credit for it.

In the seventh episode, "25 Reasons the NSA Should Hire Buzzfeed Staffers", Topple sends Winters a fax of his analysis of the North Korean computer virus called "Staxnut". As the two converse on the computer virus, it is revealed that the computer virus could replace all American digital content with North Korean flag dancing. Given that North Korea is busy producing flags, there is still time to stop the virus. However, Topple realizes it would wipe out electronic dance music (and other media) he loathes and thus realizes his dilemma.

In the eighth episode, "How to Kill Your Boss", Winters informs Topple that she called Chief Deputy Rollins and that Rollins does not want Topple on the Staxnut project. Annoyed that he is not involved with the project, Topple lists off the people he has killed. In the course of the conversation, Winters receives an alert that the Chief Deputy was murdered.

== Reception ==
Agent Henry Topple (John Hodgman) getting in touch with "Special Projects" Nicole (Emily Heller).

=== Commercial ===
As of June 26, 2013, Codefellas' first episode "When Topple Met Winters" has garnered "more than 266,000 views."

=== Critical reception ===
Cory Doctorow of Boing Boing called Codefellas "pretty promising stuff!"

Eike Kühl of Die Zeit said the first two episodes "shine primarily by the bizarre dialogues of unequal protagonists."

Kate Hutchinson and Gwilym Mumford of The Guardian called Codefellas "very odd", saying "it acts well as an accompaniment to the more hyperactive comedy of Archer."

Charlie Anders of io9 called Codefellas "ridiculously funny."

E. D. W. Lynch of Laughing Squid called Codefellas "hilarious."

Sherwin Siy, VP of legal affairs for consumer advocacy group Public Knowledge, took issue with the premise, saying "It'd be a shame if people started to view pervasive government surveillance as another laughable daily chore, like traffic or boring meetings. On the other hand, it's entirely possible for good comedy to poke at and explore sensitive and enraging issues."

David Haglund of Slate said "I'm looking forward to the rest."

Bradford Evans of Splitsider called Codefellas "a fast, funny comedy that does for domestic spying what Archer does for international espionage."

Sam Gutelle of Tubefilter praised Codefellas as "somewhere between Doonesbury and Archer" and said that it "has a chance to become the first smash hit across Conde Nast's network of YouTube channels."

== See also ==
- Get Your War On
- List of rotoscoped works
- List of Web television series
