= Michael Perlis =

American business executive

- Born: Mike Perlis
- Education: Syracuse University (B.A.)
- Occupations: Vice Chairman and Strategic Adviser, Forbes Media

Michael S. Perlis is an American business executive who is vice chairman and strategic adviser at Forbes Media LLC. He previously worked for Playboy, SoftBank Capital, and Ziff Davis. Perlis was CEO of Forbes from December 2010 to October 2017, when he became vice chairman and strategic adviser. As of 2026 he serves as interim CEO of Condé Nast.

== Education ==
Perlis attended Syracuse University, graduating in 1976 with a BA in communications. He is on the Board of Advisors of Syracuse's Newhouse School of Public Communications.

== Career ==
Perlis began his career in media in Camden, Maine as co-founder of New England Publications. He later worked as publisher for International Data Group before moving on to Rodale Press in Emmaus, Pennsylvania as publisher of Runner's World, Bicycling, Active Sports Network, and other magazines. In September 1985, Rodale Press named Perlis as publisher of Runner's World magazine, a globally circulated monthly magazine for runners published by Rodale Press. After Rodale Press acquired the George A. Hirsch magazine Runner from CBS Magazines in January 1987 and merged it into Runner's World magazine, Perlis was replaced as publisher of Runner's World magazine by Hirsch. In 1989, Perlis left Rodale to work for Playboy Publishing Group.

He returned to the media industry in late 2010, accepting the president and CEO role at Forbes Media. At Forbes, Perlis has focused on the brand's digital footprint, overseeing the magazine's digital growth to over 30 million unique users a month.

In September 2026, Perlis became the interim-CEO of Condé Nast after the then CEO Roger Lynch stepped down.

== Personal ==
Perlis lives in Connecticut and Maine and is a trustee of Outward Bound.
