= WideAngle =

Mobile application

- Initial release: March 2013; 13 years ago
- Operating system: iOS
- Platform: iPad; iPhone
- Type: social media aggregation, photo sharing

WideAngle is a free social media and photo aggregating mobile application that initially launched for the iPad in March 2013 with an additional launch for the iPhone in May 2013. An Android version of the app was planned for release in 2013.

== History ==
WideAngle began development in the summer of 2012. The WideAngle team is currently made up of seven people. The iPhone version of WideAngle launched in May 2013. At the time, over 14 million Facebook and Instagram photos were viewed by users in 125 countries. WideAngle reached 100,000 users within 15 weeks after its initial launch in July 2013.

== Photo discovery ==
WideAngle combines photos from Facebook, Instagram, Photo Stream, text messages and iPad/iPhone devices. Personal photos from those sources and friends' photos from Instagram and Facebook are shown within the app. Photos can be sorted by date taken, location, source, camera type, resolution, event, saved status and an interactive map feature. New albums can be created within the app, and photos can be shared by email, Facebook, Twitter, Instagram, and other platforms from within the app.

== Social media aggregation ==
WideAngle combines photos from Facebook and Instagram. Users are able to read and add comments as well as like photos. Comments and likes added within WideAngle appear in the original social media platform. WideAngle planned to add more social media and photo sources as well as to launch an Android version of their app in the near future.
