= Going Deep with David Rees =

American television series

- Genre: Instructional
- Starring: David Rees
- Country of origin: United States
- Original language: English

Production
- Production location: United States
- Running time: 22 minutes

Original release
- Network: National Geographic Channel (2014); Esquire Network (2015)
- Release: 2014

Going Deep with David Rees is an American television program.

The first season was shown on the National Geographic Channel. The program is hosted by David Rees, and explores everyday things that we take for granted. It began in the summer of 2014. The second season premiered on Esquire Network on November 11, 2015.

== Episodes ==
=== Season 1 (2014) ===
Episode	Title	Summary	Original air date
1	"How to Make an Ice Cube"	In this season premiere, David learns how to make a perfect ice cube.	July 14, 2014
2	"How to Tie Your Shoes"	Tying the perfect shoelace knot is not always an easy task, David learns the best method from the experts.	July 14, 2014
3	"How to Dig a Hole"	David learns the in's and out's of digging the perfect hole.	July 21, 2014
4	"How to Flip a Coin"	David takes us on a coin flipping adventure, learning how to flip a coin the right way.	July 21, 2014
5	"How to Swat a Fly"	Flies are everywhere and David is trying to learn the correct method for swatting flies.	July 28, 2014
6	"How to Open a Door"	David learns the right way to open a door and gets himself hurt along the way.	July 28, 2014
7	"How to Throw a Paper Airplane"	David learns to fold and throw the perfect paper airplane.	August 4, 2014
8	"How to Light a Match"	David learns all about matches and fire.	August 11, 2014
9	"How to Climb a Tree"	After his parents denied him the experience as a child, David learns the best way to climb a tree.	August 18, 2014
10	"How to Shake Hands"	David learns the right way in shaking a hand.	August 25, 2014

=== Season 2 (2015) ===
Episode	Title	Summary	Original air date
1	"How to Pet a Dog"	David learns everything he can about how to properly pet a dog.	November 11, 2015
2	"How to Eavesdrop"	David learns how to eavesdrop on people who are talking about him.	November 18, 2015
3	"How to get Punched"	David learns how to properly punch and how to best take a punch.	November 25, 2015
4	"How to Bounce A Ball"	David learns how to bounce a ball.	December 2, 2015
5	"How to Sign Your Name"	David learns how to improve his signature, featured in the logo of the show.	December 9, 2015
6	"How to Take a Nap"	David explores the science of sleep and uncovers the benefits of napping.	December 16, 2015
7	"How to Make Toast"	David learns how to make a perfectly brown and crispy toast.	December 23, 2015
8	"How to Do The Dishes"	David learns the most effective method for washing dishes .	December 30, 2015
