= Cookie (American magazine) =

American lifestyle magazine

- March 2007 issue of Cookie
- Editor: Pilar Guzmán
- Categories: lifestyle magazine
- First issue: November 2005
- Final issue: November 2009
- Company: Condé Nast
- Country: United States
- Based in: New York City
- Language: English
- ISSN: 1556-410X

Cookie was a lifestyle magazine for the modern mother published from 2005 until November 2009 by Condé Nast. According to Conde Nast, it featured "an editorial mix of fashion, home décor, travel, entertainment and health for her and her family."

Cookie had a total circulation of 500,000. It was targeted to women, which made up 86% of their readership, with a median age of 36.9 and median household income of $82,442. The magazine started by publishing six issues per year, but by the time it folded it appeared ten times annually. The official website for the magazine was cookiemag.com.

On October 5, 2009, Condé Nast announced that Cookie would no longer be published and that the resources used to publish the magazine would be used elsewhere in the company.

== Awards and recognition ==
Cookie was named Launch of the Year by Ad Age for 2007. The magazine was also nominated for the prestigious ASME General Excellence Award in 2007 and in 2008.

== Editorial ==
The editorial office for Cookie was housed in the Condé Nast Building at 4 Times Square in New York City on the 8th floor.

Pilar Guzmán served as editor-in-chief for the entire run of the magazine. In 2008, she was named one of Crain's Top Forty Under 40: New York's Rising Stars.
