= The Hybrid Front =

1994 video game

- Cover art
- Developers: Sega; Oniro; H.I.C.
- Publisher: Sega
- Designers: Masahiro Noda; Kunio Aoi (character design); Jun Suemi
- Composers: Naofumi Hataya; Junko Shiratsu; Sachio Ogawa
- Platform: Mega Drive
- Release: JP: July 22, 1994
- Genre: Turn-based strategy
- Mode: Single-player

The Hybrid Front (ハイブリッド・フロント, Haiburiddo Furonto) is a turn-based strategy video game, released in Japan on July 22, 1994, for the Mega Drive. It was re-released for the Virtual Console on May 29, 2007.

== Story ==
The introduction begins with someone logging into a computer, accessing a history archive. Then, it shows a revolution that occurred sometime in the 2080s leading into a series of wars and conflict that lead up to the video game's main setting of the 26th century.

Since the second half of the 21st century, the depletion of fossil fuel resources have helped to deepen the conflict on Earth. By the end of the 20th century, second and third world countries with lesser economic and political standing had turned to corporate support to ensure civil stability, resulting in the passing of the Corporate Support Act, allowing for military empowerment by the creation of the private military contracting based Corporate Police Force shortly after. Into the 22nd century, Middle Eastern oil magistrates soon waned in power upon the proliferation of hydrogen energy technologies, and contributed majorly to spurring corporate entities to establish orbital satellite based industries and communities. Things never truly became peaceful even after the world was forced to switch over from using petroleum-based fuel to using hydrogen fuel. Global warming continued without any signs of giving up. The 22nd century would see humanity slowly recover from the "oil wars" that lasted from the late 20th century to the year 2132.

At the start of the 24th century, with the corporate powers having established enough self-sustaining infrastructure, they had proposed a seceding from the nations of Earth into their own collective power, which was immediately opposed by the United Nations. Ultimately, political tensions would rise from this bitter feud over the years and world war history would repeat itself with the First and Second Orbital Wars, culminating in the corporate powers' complete takeover of the satellite collective of Earth's orbital belt. Upon the end of the First Orbital War, the corporate powers would make themselves known as CoCoON (abbreviation for Cooperation Community of Orbital Negotiation), and the Second Orbital War, or the "Hammer War", was the establishing landslide victory for CoCoON, by their complete aerospace dominance, and possession of powerful orbital satellite weaponry, including the Italian consortium made meteorite cannon Metal Hammer, being used to strategically decimate Earth's major cities and centers of industry. Coming to a truce by force with CoCoON's total victory, the UN and Earth's nations would be reorganized as the PETO (abbreviation for Pan Earth Treaty Organization). While peace would soon come after this negotiation at the end of the Orbital Wars, CoCoON would develop a reputation as a hostile group of corporate war hawks; constantly revolting against the peaceful coalition of the PETO and forcing them to act as a puppet government while allowed to act and do as they pleased, having a complete monopoly over human civilization. However, central to PETO's last resort of resistance were those of independent post-Orbital War logistics runners and movers who were able to continue Earth's supply chain even in the anarchy of the wars, the Mules. Together, PETO's and the Mule's efforts will eventually come to show how they will make history and succeed in the resistance against CoCoon, as the legendary Hybrid Front.

== Gameplay ==
A screenshot of one of the earlier battles in progress

All units are color-coded; it serves as a guideline for players to determine allies from enemies when a large number of units are close together. Artillery with an obscured line of sight may still accidentally deliver their payload to non-hostile units. The blue color is given to the units whose allegiance is directly towards the player while neutral units are assigned an orange color and enemy units are all marked in red. Units can be placed either manually or automatically by pressing the Start button on the Sega Mega Drive. Mild violence is present in the game, although blood is absent. There are 26 levels in this game, all of which were designed by level designer Izumi Takemoyo.

The easiest battles in the game are assigned 15 player turns, while missions with an average difficulty allow the players to play between 20 and 25 turns. The hardest missions in the game give the players 30 turns to successfully complete the objectives.

Asteroids tend to interfere with both combat and movement during extraterrestrial missions. In addition to planet Earth and Mars, there is also a quick mission that takes place on the Moon. Missions on Earth are either fought indoors or outdoors; there is little difference in these battles except for the floor tiles and some of the scenery tiles.

=== Organizations ===
CoCoON (Cooperation Community of Orbital Negotiation)
They are a global corporate group which are roughly divided into six main groups. They are considered to be like large-scale contemporary international conglomerates and business groups. After surviving a natural resources crisis, they helped to diffuse humanity and develop technological advances. CoCoON maintains their own military thanks to having influence beyond that of a nation state. In recent years, they developed Mars (with PETO trying to spark a series of civil wars on that planet) and maintain a corporate hegemony over the Earth.
Pan Earth Treaty Organization
They are equivalent to the modern-day United Nations. Their government spans for regions but have a limited ability to govern and are dependent on couriers. An increasingly global reconstruction movement is an attempt by PETO in order to expand their control.
Mule
They are a contractor for armored transports. Indispensable to the people of this era, they are outlaws according to both CoCoON's and PETO's point of view. They participated in a massive rebellion called "Calcutta Disturbance History"; causing a temporary but severe tightening in the legal system.

=== Units ===
Despite the futuristic surroundings of the video game; most of the units are still based on the technology used by various military organizations of the late 20th century. Examples of units that can be given orders by the player includes main battle tanks, armoured fighting vehicles, self-propelled artillery and anti-aircraft tanks.

Other units (on land, sea, air and space) are found on later missions, carrying more powerful weapons to handle the missions as they evolve from quick low-intensity battles to Star Wars-inspired space battles, where they are fought on the level of controlling an entire brigade at the same time.

== Development ==
On June 30, 2025, an English fan translation of the game was released.

== Reception ==
Reception

Review scores
Publication	Score
Beep! MegaDrive	6.75/10
Famitsu	7/10, 6/10, 6/10, 6/10
Mega Force	59%

According to Famitsu, The Hybrid Front sold 3,818 copies during its lifetime in Japan. The game received a 21.0/30 score in a poll conducted by Mega Drive Fan and a 8.7772/10 score in a 1995 readers' poll conducted by the Japanese Sega Saturn Magazine, ranking among Sega Mega Drive titles at the number 19 spot. It also garnered mixed reviews from critics.

An editor for the Japanese gaming book Mega Drive Encyclopedia called The Hybrid Front a "masterpiece of strategy simulation", praising its epic storyline. They noted that the gameplay system was inherited from Advanced Daisenryaku, but it was simplified and easy to play, and that enemy attacks were not as fierce, making the game moderately difficult. In a series of articles for the Japanese gaming website Game*Spark, writer Ritsuko Kawai highlighted the game's meticulous setting and Jun Suemi's character design. Kawai pointed out that, due to the game's highly realistic design and the fact that early battles influence later plot developments, it is not suitable for contemplative players, but rather for those who enjoy challenging role-playing games like Fire Emblem: Thracia 776.

== Sources ==
- Official Page of The Hybrid Front (in Japanese)
- Information about The Hybrid Front (in Japanese)
- The Hybrid Front at GameFAQs
- Timeline for The Hybrid Front at NetYou.jp (in Japanese)
- List of scenarios for The Hybrid Front at NetYou.jp (in Japanese)
