= Benjamin Arthur (animator) =

American animator and illustrator

- Born: Benjamin Timothy Arthur; April 26, 1982 (age 44); San Francisco, California, U.S.
- Occupations: Animator, illustrator
- Years active: 2006–present
- Notable work: Hack Your Health: The Secrets of Your Gut (2024)
- Awards: Daytime Emmy Award (2025)
- Website: arthuranimation.com

Benjamin Timothy Arthur (born April 26, 1982) is an American animator and illustrator. He is known for the Emmy-winning Netflix documentary Hack Your Health: The Secrets of Your Gut (2024), and for science explainers produced with NPR correspondents, including A Mystery: Why Can't We Walk Straight? (2010), Look Up! The Billion-Bug Highway You Can't See (2010), and the microbiome short The Invisible Universe of the Human Microbiome (2014). He first drew attention with the rotoscoped short Once Upon a Time in the Woods (2006).

== Career ==
Arthur's commissioned animation for NPR and collaborating public-radio outlets helped popularize research topics for broad audiences, including human navigation and high-altitude insect migration. His animation accompanied NPR health correspondent Rob Stein's microbiome series, later recognized by the National Academies' Keck Futures Initiative Communication Awards.

In 2024–25, Arthur served as Animation/VFX Director on Netflix’s Hack Your Health: The Secrets of Your Gut (Tremolo Productions/Spillt), whose main titles and graphic design received a Daytime Emmy Award."52nd Annual Daytime Emmy Awards Winners" (PDF). theemmys.tv. NATAS. October 17, 2025.

== Selected works ==
- Hack Your Health: The Secrets of Your Gut (2024) — Animation/VFX Director (main titles); Daytime Emmy Award for Outstanding Main Title and Graphic Design (2025)"52nd Annual Daytime Emmy Awards Winners" (PDF). theemmys.tv. NATAS. October 17, 2025.
- A Mystery: Why Can’t We Walk Straight? (2010) — animation for NPR explainer by Robert KrulwichKrulwich, Robert (November 22, 2010). "A Mystery: Why Can't We Walk Straight?". WBUR/NPR.
- Look Up! The Billion-Bug Highway You Can’t See (2010) — animation for NPR explainer"Look Up! The Billion-Bug Highway You Can't See". North Country Public Radio (NPR syndication). July 15, 2010.
- The Invisible Universe of the Human Microbiome (2014) — animation for NPR/Rob Stein series"The Invisible Universe Of The Human Microbiome". Vimeo (NPR video). August 16, 2014."An adorable way to learn about the microorganisms living inside you". Salon. November 4, 2013. Archived from the original on November 6, 2013.
- The Influencing Machine (2011) — animated trailer for Brooke Gladstone & Josh Neufeld’s nonfiction bookNeufeld, Josh (May 19, 2011). "THE INFLUENCING MACHINE animated book trailer!". Josh Neufeld Comix and Stories.
- Once Upon a Time in the Woods (2006) — rotoscoped short film"Once Upon a Time in the Woods". YouTube. July 8, 2007.

== Awards and honors ==
- 2011: Third place, Multimedia Innovation — WHNPA “Eyes of History” Digital Storytelling (with NPR team)"2011 Eyes of History: New Media Contest". White House News Photographers Association. 2011.
- 2014: National Academies Keck Futures Initiative Communication Award — Film/Radio/TV category, to NPR/Rob Stein’s microbiome series featuring Arthur’s animation"2014 Winners and Finalists". National Academies Keck Futures Initiative (archived). October 15, 2014. Archived from the original on January 19, 2017.
- 2025: Daytime Emmy Award — Outstanding Main Title and Graphic Design for Hack Your Health: The Secrets of Your Gut (Animation/VFX Director)"52nd Annual Daytime Emmy Awards Winners" (PDF). theemmys.tv. National Academy of Television Arts & Sciences. October 17, 2025.
