= Mr. Know-It-All (web series) =

- Mister Know-It-All title card
- Genre: Advice
- Country of origin: United States
- Original language: English
- No. of seasons: 1

Original release
- Network: YouTube
- Release: June 14, 2013 – present

Mister Know-It-All (or Mr. Know-It-All) is an American animated web series distributed by technology news magazine Wired, based on the popular advice column.

== Background ==
After Wired joined Condé Nast's Digital Video Network, five original web series were announced for Wired's video channel including Mister Know-It-All and Codefellas.

== Production ==
Animation for Mister Know-It-All is produced by M. Wartella's studio, Dream Factory Animation, for Condé Nast and @radical.media in the style of illustrator Christoph Niemann. Music and sound design were created by Sam Retzer.

The first trailer was uploaded on June 4, 2013. The first episode, "Toddler Music", was uploaded on June 14, 2013, and the second episode, "Expired Medication", was uploaded on July 26, 2013.

== See also ==
- List of Web television series
