= David Rees (cartoonist) =

American humorist (born 1972)

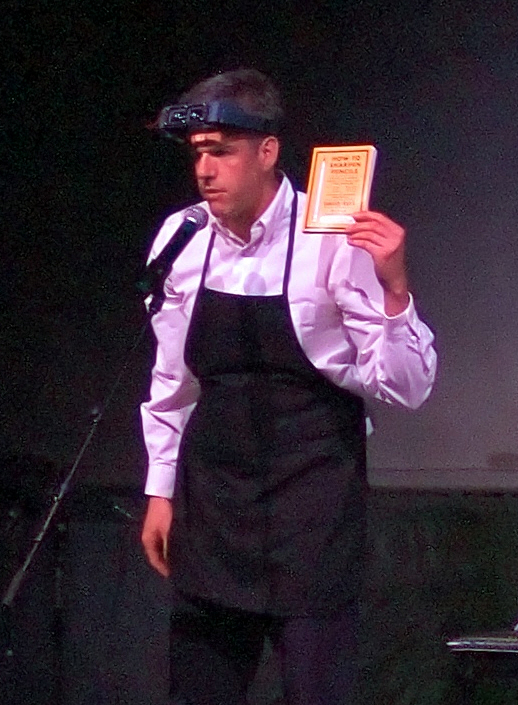
- Rees in 2012
- Born: June 22, 1972 (age 54) Chapel Hill, North Carolina, United States
- Areas: Cartoonist, writer, artist, television host
- Notable works: Get Your War On
- Spouses: Sarah Lariviere (m. 2002; div. 2012); Emily Yoshida (m. 2018; div. 2022)

David Thomas Rees (/riːs/ REESS; born June 22, 1972) is a humorist and cultural critic. He first rose to prominence as a cartoonist whose best-known work combined bland clip art with "trash talk". Rees later created an artisanal pencil sharpening service and published a related book on the subject. He co-created and hosted two seasons of the television series Going Deep with David Rees. He is also the co-creator and co-host of the podcast Election Profit Makers.

== Early life ==
Rees grew up in Chapel Hill, North Carolina, and was an avid reader of Rex Morgan, M.D. comics. According to Rees, while a young man he and three of his friends recorded over 2,000 songs as members of a "secret band".

He is a graduate of Oberlin College, and drew comics for the school's newspaper, The Oberlin Review.

== Career ==
=== Cartoonist ===
Rees first became known for his office-cubicle humor that was inspired by his experience working in a basement for Citicorp. He also pulled his humor from his experience as a part-time fact-checker for Maxim and Martha Stewart Weddings magazines.

There are five collected volumes of his work. His best known and most controversial comic is Get Your War On, which has been translated into French, Spanish and Italian. When the follow-up volume, Get Your War On II was published, Rees donated all the royalties of both books (more than $100,000) to Adopt-a-Minefield, an organization that works to remove landmines from post-conflict areas. He is also the author of the comic strips My New Fighting Technique is Unstoppable, My New Filing Technique is Unstoppable, and Adventures of Confessions of Saint Augustine Bear.

=== Artisanal Pencil Sharpening ===
In 2010, Rees worked as a civil servant for the United States Census Bureau, a position that revitalized his interest in pencils.

In July 2010, Rees announced an Artisanal Pencil Sharpening service. Rees said that, for prices starting at $15, people could buy a sharpened pencil or mail in a pencil to be sharpened by him. Rees claimed to be a craftsman in "the age-old art of manual pencil sharpening", saying his “artisanal service is perfect for artists, writers, and standardized test takers." He also sold art prints bundled with a sharpened pencil. According to The New Yorker, "This was before parody menus of farm-to-table restaurants had come out, before it was a cliché to make jokes about Mason jars and pickle-making, and artisanal culture desperately needed to be mocked. For fifteen dollars, Rees would hand-sharpen your pencil, bag up the shavings, and send it all back to you with a certificate of authenticity. It was deeply, satisfyingly ridiculous, and he was besieged with orders".

Rees released a book entitled How to Sharpen Pencils in April 2012. The New York Times called it a methodical, deliberate and gleeful subversion and satire that "capture[s] the inherently joyless tedium of conveying specialized instructional information, while tipping off the reader that the cod liver oil is laced with laughing gas." It noted the book contains sections such as a list of common and uncommon children’s names, a comparison of the taste of certain wines versus the taste of certain pencils, and a guide to impressions of Sean Connery and Robert De Niro, but the review also noted that you can actually use the book to learn how to sharpen pencils.

In 2016 Rees announced that he would be raising his price per pencil to $500 and said he did not know if anyone would accept the new price.

=== Television and podcasting ===
In July 2014 the TV show Going Deep with David Rees launched on the National Geographic Channel. The show featured Rees humorously investigating the science and process behind very basic tasks such as making ice, lighting matches and the tying of shoelaces. For the second season, the show moved to the Esquire Network.

Rees hosts the weekly podcast Election Profit Makers with his childhood friend Jon Kimball and Starlee Kine in which they discuss the prediction market website PredictIt.org. The podcast first appeared as a series of 17 episodes before the 2016 U.S. presidential election and returned in the months before the 2020 U.S. presidential election.

Rees co-created the animated television series Dicktown with John Hodgman, and starred as the character David Purefoy. It was released in 2020. Dicktown was renewed for a second season, which premiered in 2022.

=== Music ===
In late 2014 via his SoundCloud page, Rees released Aphex Swift, a collection of eight songs that combined the vocals of Taylor Swift and the electronic music of Aphex Twin. The collection received positive mentions ranging from The Verge, which called it "bizarrely good", to The A.V. Club and Time. In 2021, Rees released his first album of original noise music titled, YOU AINT GOIN NOWHERE, on the flower sounds music label.

=== Writing and blogging ===
Over his career Rees has written for a variety of publications. Since May 2005, Rees has been a contributing blogger at The Huffington Post. In 2013, Rees began writing for Wired's first scripted web series Codefellas.

== Personal life ==
Rees married Sarah Lariviere in 2002; they divorced in 2012.

In 2010, Rees lived in Beacon, New York.

== Bibliography ==
- Get Your War On. Brooklyn: Soft Skull, 2002. ISBN 1-887128-76-X.
- My New Fighting Technique is Unstoppable. New York: Riverhead, 2003. ISBN 1-57322-373-5.
- My New Filing Technique is Unstoppable. New York: Riverhead, 2004. ISBN 1-57322-382-4.
- Get Your War On II. New York: Riverhead, 2004. ISBN 1-59448-048-6.
- Get Your War On: The Definitive Account of the War On Terror, 2001–2008. Brooklyn: Soft Skull, 2008. ISBN 1-59376-213-5.
- How to Sharpen Pencils: A Practical and Theoretical Treatise on the Artisanal Craft of Pencil Sharpening. Melville House, 2012. ISBN 1-61219-040-5.

== Notes ==
- Interview in The Comics Interpreter vol. 2, #3
