= Unified Remote =

Unified Remote is a mobile application from Unified Intents for remote controlling programs on a user's computer from their smartphone. This application attempts to simplify the task of controlling many different programs from one app, and includes support for 70+ applications such as Spotify, YouTube, VLC Media Player, and Windows Media Player.

== Background ==
Unified Remote is the result of a hobby project of two Swedish students, Jakob Berglund and Philip Bergqvist, which later turned into a profitable start-up venture. The app was first launched as a free app on Android in 2010, with simple features and support for 13 remote controls for Windows applications. A year later, an improved version was released, as well as a paid (premium) version including more features and remote controls. The latest version was launched in 2014, which included an overhauled user interface and introduced support for iOS, Mac, and Linux.

== Growth ==
Since 2010, the company has gained popularity in online media within social media, news sites, and blogger communities. Most notably, the app has been featured on sites such as:

- CNET
- TheJournal
- PC World
- Gizmodo UK
- Lifehacker
- Android Police.

International media coverage includes:

- Brazil
- Poland
- Germany,
- Sweden

== Features ==
The application provides many remote controls for various programs. This includes basic mouse and keyboard input and support for media applications, presentation software, and even power functions. The server also provides an open API, which makes it possible for developers to create their own custom remote controls.
