= Mobile app =

Software application designed to run on mobile devices

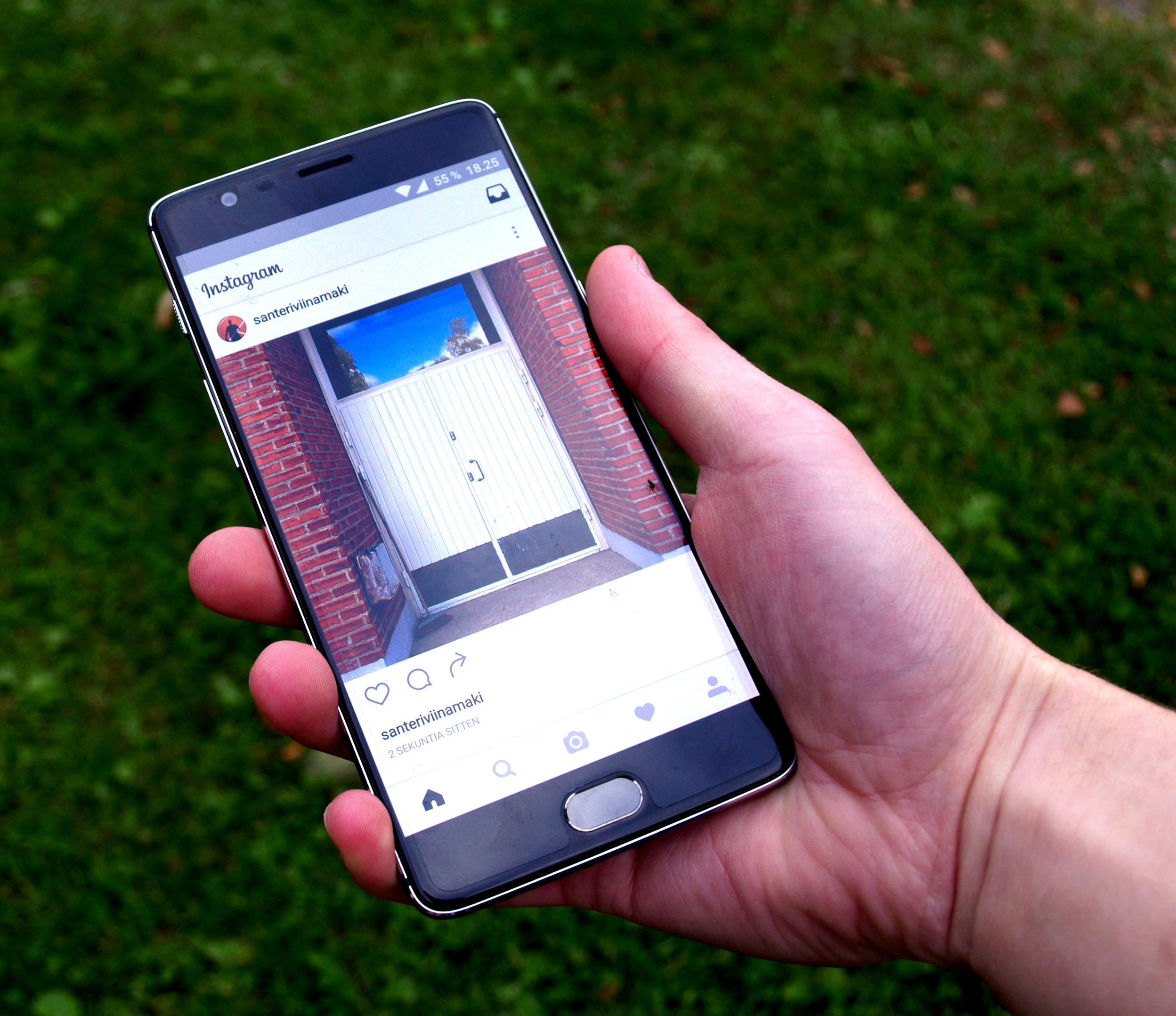
The Instagram photo sharing app on a smartphone

A mobile app or application is a computer program or software application designed to run on a mobile device such as a smartphone, tablet, or smartwatch. Mobile applications often stand in contrast to desktop applications which are designed to run on desktop computers, and web applications which run in mobile web browsers rather than directly on the mobile device.

Apps were originally intended for productivity assistance such as email, calendar, and contact databases, but the public demand for apps caused rapid expansion into other areas such as mobile games, factory automation, GPS and location-based services, order-tracking, and ticket purchases, so that there are now millions of apps available. Many apps require Internet access. Apps are generally downloaded from app stores, which are a type of digital distribution platforms.

The term "app", short for "application", has since become very popular; in 2010, it was listed as "Word of the Year" by the American Dialect Society.

Apps are broadly classified into three types: native apps, hybrid apps and web apps. Native applications are designed specifically for a mobile operating system, typically iOS or Android. Web apps are written in HTML5 or CSS and typically run through a browser. Hybrid apps are built using web technologies such as JavaScript, CSS, and HTML5 and function like web apps disguised in a native container.

== Overview ==
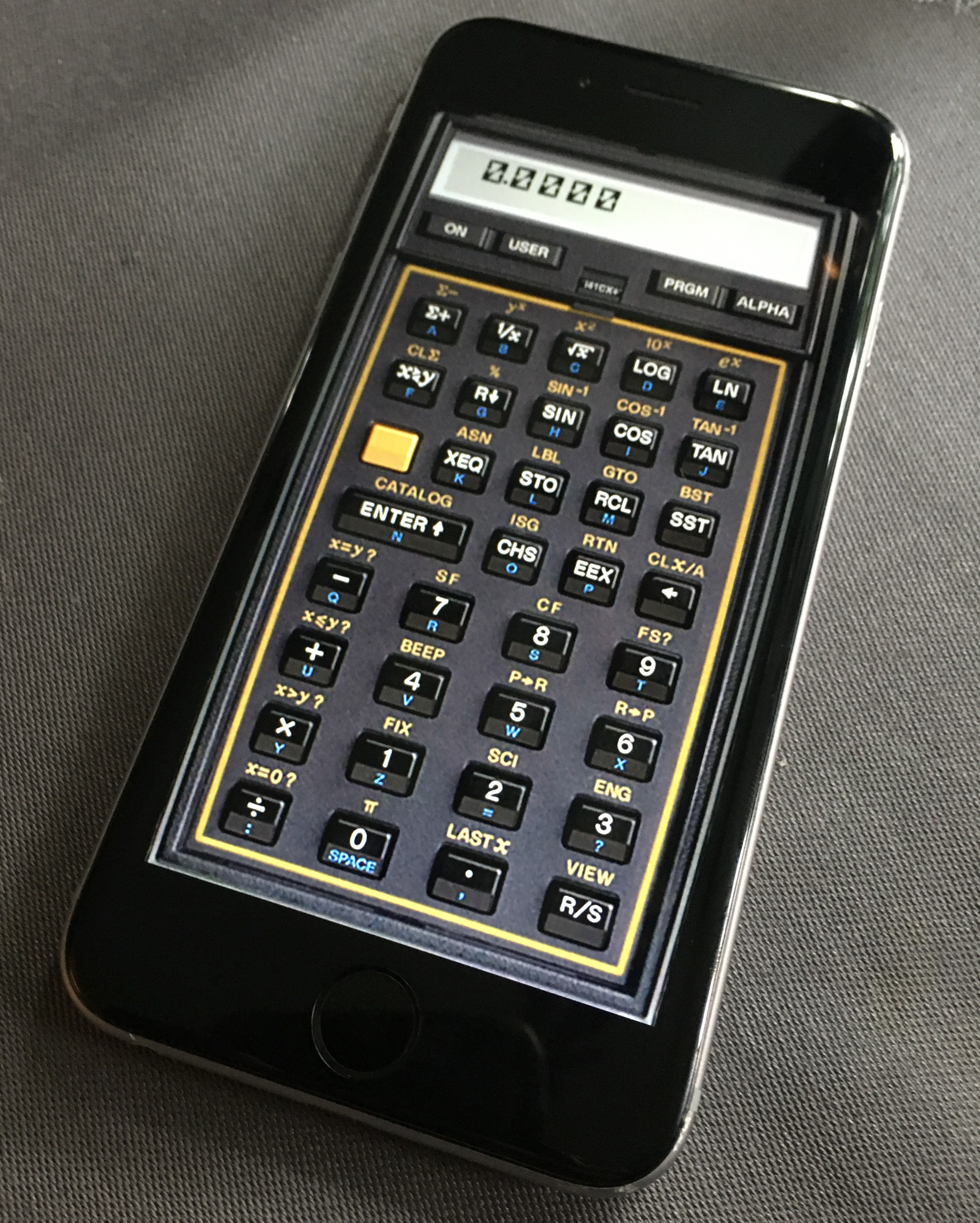
An emulation app for the programmable pocket calculator HP-41CX from 1983. Several such apps exist for full-functionally emulating old home computers, game consoles or even mainframe computers from up to several decades ago.

Most mobile devices are sold with several apps bundled as pre-installed software, such as a web browser, email client, calendar, mapping program, and an app for buying music, other media, or more apps. Some pre-installed apps can be removed by an ordinary uninstall process, thus leaving more storage space for desired ones. Where the software does not allow this, some devices can be rooted, jailbroken, or otherwise modified to eliminate the undesired apps.

Users can download non-preinstalled apps from distribution platforms such as app stores. These may be operated by the owner of the device's mobile operating system, such as the App Store or Google Play Store; by the device manufacturers, such as the Galaxy Store and Huawei AppGallery; or by third parties, such as the Amazon Appstore and F-Droid.

Usually, they are downloaded from the platform to a target device, but sometimes they can be downloaded to laptops or desktop computers. Apps can also be installed manually, for example by running an Android application package on Android devices.

Some apps are freeware, while others have a price, which can be upfront or a subscription. Some apps also include microtransactions or advertising. In any case, the revenue is usually split between the application's creator and the app store. The same app can, therefore, cost a different price depending on the mobile platform.

Mobile apps were originally offered for general productivity and information retrieval, including email, calendar, contacts, the stock market and weather information. However, public demand and the availability of developer tools drove rapid expansion into other categories, such as those handled by desktop application software packages. As with other software, the explosion in number and variety of apps made discovery a challenge, which in turn led to the creation of a wide range of review, recommendation, and curation sources, including blogs, magazines, and dedicated online app-discovery services. In 2014 government regulatory agencies began trying to regulate and curate apps, particularly medical apps. Some companies offer apps as an alternative method to deliver content with certain advantages over an official website.

With a growing number of mobile applications available at app stores and the improved capabilities of smartphones, people are downloading more applications to their devices. Usage of mobile apps has become increasingly prevalent across mobile phone users. A May 2012 comScore study reported that during the previous quarter, more mobile subscribers used apps than browsed the web on their devices: 51.1% vs. 49.8% respectively. Researchers found that usage of mobile apps strongly correlates with user context and depends on user's location and time of the day. Mobile apps are playing an ever-increasing role within healthcare and when designed and integrated correctly can yield many benefits.

Market research firm Gartner predicted that 102 billion apps would be downloaded in 2013 (91% of them free), which would generate $26 billion in the US, up 44.4% on 2012's US$18 billion. By Q2 2015, the Google Play and Apple stores alone generated $5 billion. An analyst report estimates that the app economy creates revenues of more than €10 billion per year within the European Union, while over 529,000 jobs have been created in 28 EU states due to the growth of the app market.

== Types ==
Mobile applications may be classified by numerous methods. A common scheme is to distinguish native, web-based, and hybrid apps.

=== Native app ===
All apps targeted toward a particular mobile platform are known as native apps. Therefore, an app intended for Apple device does not run on Android devices. As a result, most businesses develop apps for multiple platforms.

While developing native apps, professionals incorporate best-in-class user interface modules. This accounts for better performance, consistency and a good user experience. Users also benefit from wider access to application programming interfaces and make limitless use of all apps from the particular device. Further, they also switch over from one app to another effortlessly.

The main purpose of creating such apps is to ensure the best performance for a specific mobile operating system.

=== Web-based app ===
A web-based app is implemented with the standard web technologies of HTML, CSS, and JavaScript. Internet access is typically required for proper behavior or being able to use all features compared to offline usage. Most, if not all, user data is stored in the cloud.

The performance of these apps is similar to a web application running in a browser, which can be noticeably slower than the equivalent native app. It also may not have the same level of features as the native app.

=== Hybrid app ===
The concept of the hybrid app is a mix of native and web-based apps. Apps developed using Apache Cordova, Flutter, Xamarin, React Native, Sencha Touch, and other frameworks fall into this category.

Hybrid apps are made to support web and native technologies across multiple platforms. These apps are easier and faster to develop than pure native apps. Development involves the use of a single codebase that works in multiple mobile operating systems.

Despite such advantages, hybrid apps exhibit lower performance. Often, apps fail to bear the same look-and-feel in different mobile operating systems.

== Development ==
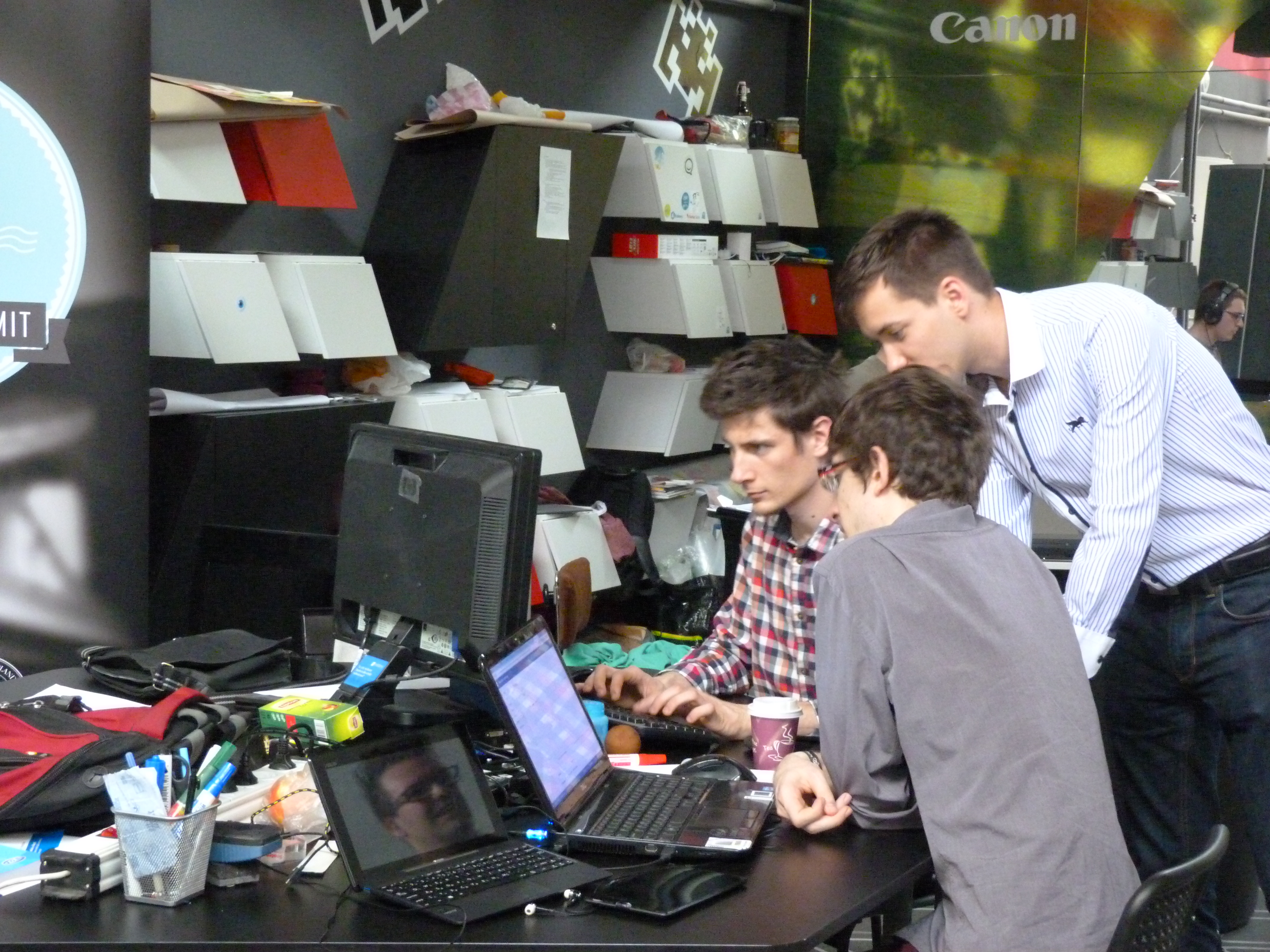
Developers at work

Developing apps for mobile devices requires considering the constraints and features of these devices. Mobile devices run on battery and have less powerful processors than personal computers and also have more features such as location detection and cameras. Developers also have to consider a wide array of screen sizes, hardware specifications and configurations because of intense competition in mobile software and changes within each of the platforms (although these issues can be overcome with mobile device detection).

Mobile application development requires the use of specialized integrated development environments. Mobile apps are first tested within the development environment using emulators and later subjected to field testing. Emulators provide an inexpensive way to test applications on mobile phones to which developers may not have physical access.

Mobile user interface (UI) Design is also essential. Mobile UI considers constraints and contexts, screen, input and mobility as outlines for design. The user is often the focus of interaction with their device, and the interface entails components of both hardware and software. User input allows users to manipulate a system, and the device's output allows the system to indicate the effects of the users' manipulation. Mobile UI design constraints include limited attention and form factors, such as a mobile device's screen size for a user's hand. Mobile UI contexts signal cues from user activity, such as location and scheduling that can be shown from user interactions within a mobile application. Overall, mobile UI design's goal is primarily for an understandable, user-friendly interface.

Mobile UIs, or front-ends, rely on mobile back-ends to support access to enterprise systems. The mobile back-end facilitates data routing, security, authentication, authorization, working off-line, and service orchestration. This functionality is supported by a mix of middleware components including mobile app servers, Mobile Backend as a service (MBaaS), and SOA infrastructure.

Conversational interfaces display the computer interface and present interactions through text instead of graphic elements. They emulate conversations with real humans. There are two main types of conversational interfaces: voice assistants (like the Amazon Echo) and chatbots.

Conversational interfaces are growing particularly practical as users are starting to feel overwhelmed with mobile apps (a term known as "app fatigue").

David Limp, Amazon's senior vice president of devices, says in an interview with Bloomberg, "We believe the next big platform is voice."

== Distribution ==
The three biggest app stores are Google Play for Android, App Store for iOS, and Microsoft Store for Windows and Xbox.

=== Google Play ===
Google Play (formerly known as the Android Market) is an international online software store developed by Google for Android devices. It opened in October 2008. In July 2013, the number of apps downloaded via the Google Play Store surpassed 50 billion, of the over 1 million apps available. As of September 2016, according to Statista the number of apps available exceeded 2.4 million. Over 80% of apps in the Google Play Store are free to download. The store generated a revenue of 6 billion U.S. dollars in 2015.

=== App Store ===
Apple's App Store for iOS and iPadOS was not the first app distribution service, but it ignited the mobile revolution and was opened on July 10, 2008, and as of September 2016, reported over 140 billion downloads. The original AppStore was first demonstrated to Steve Jobs in 1993 by Jesse Tayler at NeXTWorld Expo As of June 6, 2011, there were 425,000 apps available, which had been downloaded by 200 million iOS users. During Apple's 2012 Worldwide Developers Conference, CEO Tim Cook announced that the App Store has 650,000 available apps to download as well as 30 billion apps downloaded from the app store until that date. From an alternative perspective, figures seen in July 2013 by the BBC from tracking service Adeven indicate over two-thirds of apps in the store are "zombies", barely ever installed by consumers.

=== Microsoft Store ===
Microsoft Store (formerly known as the Windows Store) was introduced by Microsoft in 2012 for its Windows 8 and Windows RT platforms. While it can also carry listings for traditional desktop programs certified for compatibility with Windows 8, it is primarily used to distribute "Windows Store apps"—which are primarily built for use on tablets and other touch-based devices (but can still be used with a keyboard and mouse, and on desktop computers and laptops).

=== Others ===
- Amazon Appstore is an alternative application store for the Android operating system. It was opened in March 2011 and as of June 2015, the app store has nearly 334,000 apps. The store no longer supports installation on any device, and is instead focused on being the app market for Amazon's Fire lines of TVs and tablets.
- Galaxy Store, formerly Samsung Apps, was introduced in September 2009. As of October 2011, the Galaxy Store reached 10 million downloads. The store is available in 125 countries and is included on Samsung Galaxy devices with OneUI.
- The Electronic AppWrapper was the first electronic distribution service to collectively provide encryption and purchasing electronically
- F-Droid — Free and open Source Android app repositories and marketplace. F-Droid hosts a central repository of FOSS Android apps, and members of the community can host their own repositories containing their own sets of apps or updates that are not available in the default repository.

== Enterprise management ==
Mobile application management (MAM) describes software and services responsible for provisioning and controlling access to internally developed and commercially available mobile apps used in business settings. The strategy is meant to offset the security risk of a Bring Your Own Device (BYOD) work strategy. When an employee brings a personal device into an enterprise setting, mobile application management enables the corporate IT staff to transfer required applications, control access to business data, and remove locally cached business data from the device if it is lost or when its owner no longer works with the company. Containerization is an alternate approach to security. Rather than controlling an employee/s entire device, containerization apps create isolated pockets separate from personal data. Company control of the device only extends to that separate container.

=== App wrapping vs. native app management ===
Especially when employees "bring your own device" (BYOD), mobile apps can be a significant security risk for businesses, because they transfer unprotected sensitive data to the Internet without the knowledge and consent of the users. Reports of stolen corporate data show how quickly corporate and personal data can fall into the wrong hands. Data theft is not just the loss of confidential information, but makes companies vulnerable to attack and blackmail.

Professional mobile application management helps companies protect their data. One option for securing corporate data is app wrapping. But there are also some disadvantages like copyright infringement or the loss of warranty rights. Functionality, productivity and user experience are particularly limited under app wrapping. The policies of a wrapped app cannot be changed. If required, it must be recreated from scratch, adding cost. An app wrapper is a mobile app made wholly from an existing website or platform, with few or no changes made to the underlying application. The "wrapper" is essentially a new management layer that allows developers to set up usage policies appropriate for app use. Examples of these policies include whether or not authentication is required, allowing data to be stored on the device, and enabling/disabling file sharing between users. Because most app wrappers are often websites first, they often do not align with iOS or Android Developer guidelines.

Alternatively, it is possible to offer native apps securely through enterprise mobility management. This enables more flexible IT management as apps can be easily implemented and policies adjusted at any time.

== See also ==
- Appbox Pro (2009)
- App store optimization
- Enterprise mobile application
- Local-first software
- Mobile commerce
- Super-app
- Unified Remote
- WideAngle (2013)
