= Emily Heller =

American comedian, writer, actor, and podcast host

- Born: Alameda, California, U.S.
- Education: University of California, Santa Cruz
- Occupations: Comedian; actress; writer; producer; podcaster
- Relatives: Marielle Heller (sister)

Emily Heller is an American comedian, writer, actress, and podcaster. Her stand-up comedy career includes two Comedy Central specials, two albums, and guest appearances on Conan, Late Night with Seth Meyers, and The Late Late Show with James Corden. She was a writer and producer for the HBO series Barry (2018–2023).

== Early life ==
Heller was born in Alameda, California. She has an older sister, film writer and director Marielle Heller, and a brother. She graduated from The College Preparatory School in Oakland, California in 2003, and from the University of California, Santa Cruz in 2007, majoring in History of Art and Visual Culture.

== Career ==
Heller signed an overall development deal with CBS Studios in 2021.

== Filmography ==
=== As writer and producer ===
- Barry
- Medical Police
- People of Earth
- Crowded
- Surviving Jack

=== As actor/performer ===
- John Oliver's New York Stand-Up Show#Season 3 (2012) – July 27, 2012
- Codefellas – 2013 animated web series
- Ground Floor – 2014–2015 TBS series, season two
- BoJack Horseman – 2015, season two, episode 12
- Comedy Central Stand-Up Presents#Season 5 (2016) – September 23, 2016
- Ice Thickeners – 2019 stand-up comedy special on Comedy Central
- The George Lucas Talk Show – October 27, 2020, as guest; episode: "Revenge of the Sick"

== Discography ==
- Good For Her (Kill Rock Stars, 2015)
- Pasta (Kill Rock Stars, 2018)

== Other creative work ==
- Baby Geniuses podcast – co-host, with Lisa Hanawalt
- Emily's Garden Show, a recurring segment on the Lovett or Leave It podcast
- What Is...? A Jeopardy! Podcast, a weekly comedy podcast that recaps Jeopardy!, co-hosted with Canadian comedian John Cullen

== Awards and nominations ==
- 2016, Daytime Creative Arts Emmy Award for Outstanding Writing Special Class (32nd Independent Spirit Awards) – nominated
- 2018, Producers Guild of America Award for Best Episodic Comedy (Barry) – nominated
- 2018, Primetime Emmy Award for Outstanding Comedy Series (Barry) – nominated
- 2018, Writers Guild of America award for Best New Series, for Barry – won
- 2018, Writers Guild of America award for Best Comedy Series, for Barry – nominated
- 2019, Writers Guild of America award for Best Comedy Series, for Barry – won
