= Condé Nast =

American mass media company

- Type: Subsidiary
- Industry: Mass media
- Founded: 1909; 117 years ago
- Founder: Condé Montrose Nast
- Headquarters: One World Trade Center; New York City 10007; U.S.
- Area served: Worldwide
- Key people: Michael Perlis (CEO, interim); Anna Wintour (Artistic Director, Global Chief Content Officer)
- Products: Magazines
- Parent: Advance Publications
- Subsidiaries: Condé Nast Entertainment; Pitchfork; Edições Globo Condé Nast (30%)
- Website: www.condenast.com

Condé Nast (/ˌkɒndeɪ ˈnæst/) is an American mass media company founded in 1909 by Condé Montrose Nast and owned by Advance Publications. Its headquarters are located at One World Trade Center in the Financial District of Lower Manhattan, New York City.

The company's media brands attract more than 72 million consumers in print, 394 million in digital and 454 million across social media platforms. These include Vogue, The New Yorker, Condé Nast Traveler, Condé Nast Traveller, GQ, Glamour, Architectural Digest, Vanity Fair, Pitchfork, Wired, Bon Appétit, and Ars Technica, among many others. Former U.S. Vogue editor-in-chief Anna Wintour serves as Artistic Director and Global Chief Content Officer. In 2011, the company launched the Condé Nast Entertainment division, tasked with developing film, television, social and digital video, and virtual reality content.

== History ==
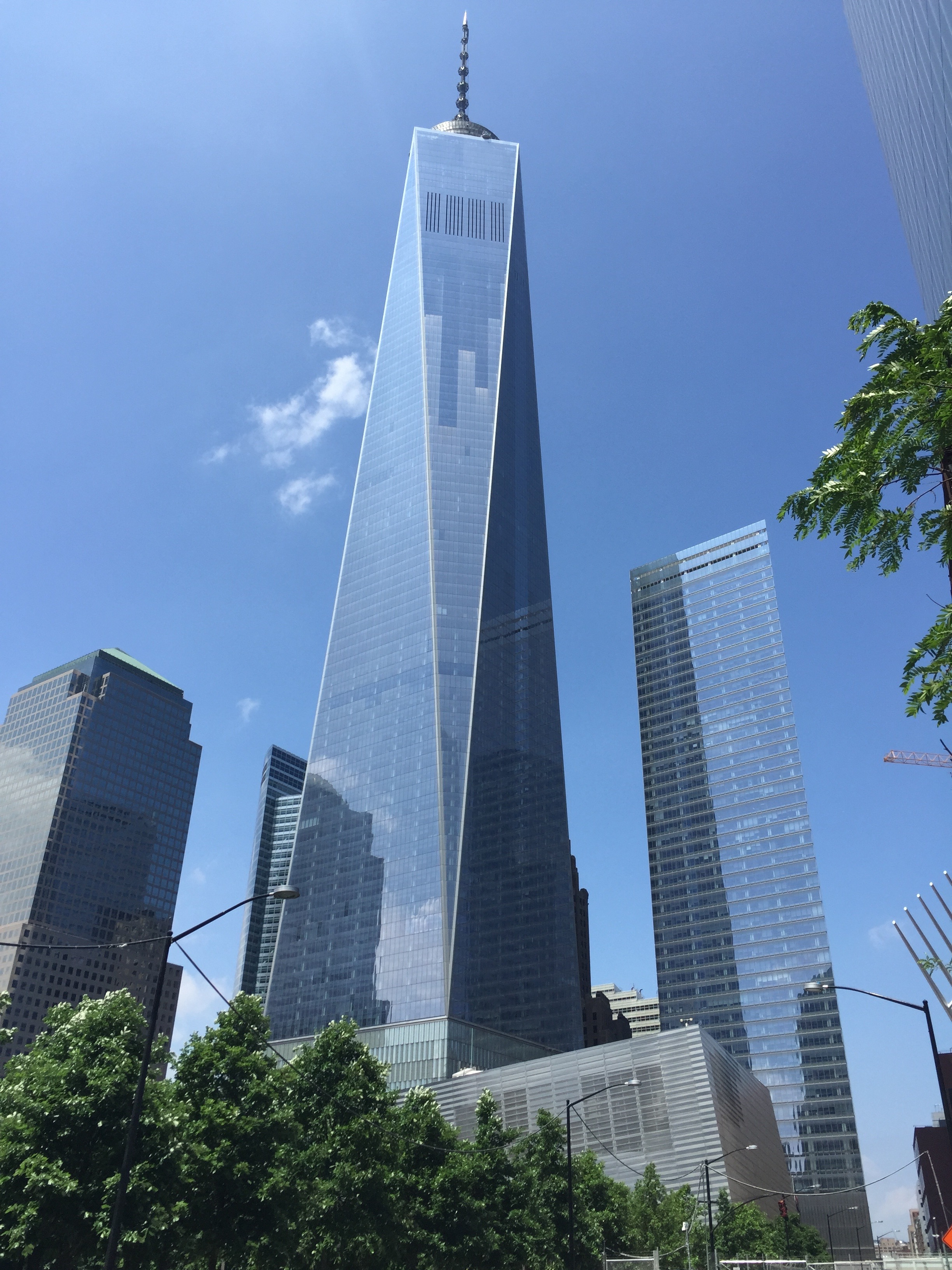
One World Trade Center, the Manhattan headquarters of the company

The company traces its roots to 1909, when Condé Montrose Nast, a New York City-born publisher, purchased Vogue, a printed magazine launched in 1892 as a New York weekly journal of society and fashion news.

Nast initially published the magazine under the corporate name Vogue Company. In 1922, he incorporated Condé Nast Publications as the holding company for his interests. Nast had a flair for nurturing elite readers as well as advertisers and upgraded Vogue, sending the magazine on its path of becoming a top haute couture fashion authority. Eventually, Nast's portfolio expanded to include House & Garden, Vanity Fair (briefly known as Dress and Vanity Fair), Glamour, and American Golfer, published from 1908 to 1920. The company also introduced British Vogue in 1916, and Condé Nast became the first publisher of an overseas edition of an existing magazine.

Condé Nast is largely considered to be the originator of the "class publication", a type of magazine focused on a particular social group or interest instead of targeting the largest possible readership. Its magazines focus on a wide range of subjects, including travel, food, home, and culture, with fashion the larger portion of the company's focus. This company also opened a printing facility in Old Greenwich, Connecticut, in 1924 but closed in 1964 to make way for more centrally located sites capable of producing higher volumes. During the Great Depression, Condé Nast introduced innovative typography, design, and color. Vogue's first full color photograph by Edward Steichen was featured on the cover in 1932, marking the year when Condé Nast began replacing fashion drawings on covers with photo illustrations―an innovative move at the time. Glamour, launched in 1939, was the last magazine personally introduced to the company by Nast, who died in 1942. The Nast family connection to the publishing business remained, with Nast's son Charles Coudert Nast serving as the company's longtime general counsel.

In 1959, Samuel I. Newhouse bought Condé Nast for US$5 million as an anniversary gift for his wife Mitzi, who loved Vogue. He merged it with the privately held holding company Advance Publications. His son, S. I. Newhouse, Jr., known as "Si", became chairman of Condé Nast in 1975. Under Newhouse, Condé Nast acquired Brides in 1959, revived Vanity Fair in 1983 after it was shuttered in 1936, and launched the new publication Self in 1979.

=== 2000–2009 ===
At the outset of the new millennium in January 2000, Condé Nast moved from 350 Madison Avenue to 4 Times Square. The move was viewed as a significant catalyst for the redevelopment of Times Square. In the same year, Condé Nast purchased Fairchild Publications (now known as Fairchild Fashion Media), home to W and WWD, from the Walt Disney Company. In 2001, Condé Nast bought Golf Digest and Golf World from the New York Times Company for US$435 million. On October 31, 2006, Condé Nast acquired the content aggregation site Reddit, later on spun off as a wholly owned subsidiary of Condé Nast's parent company in September 2011. The company folded the women's magazine Jane with its August issue in 2007, and later shut down its website. One of Condé Nast's oldest titles, the American edition of House and Garden, ceased publication after the December 2007 issue. Portfolio, Mademoiselle and Domino were folded as well. On May 20, 2008, the company announced its acquisition of a popular technology-oriented website, Ars Technica.

On October 5, 2009, Condé Nast announced the closure of three of its publications: Cookie, Modern Bride, and Elegant Bride. Gourmet ceased monthly publication with its November 2009 issue; the Gourmet brand was later resurrected as "Gourmet Live", an iPad app that delivers new editorial content in the form of recipes, interviews, stories, and videos. In print, Gourmet continues in the form of special editions on newsstands and cookbooks. That same year, Condé Nast announced the launch of Love magazine, a bi-annual British style magazine founded by fashion journalist Katie Grand. In 2020, Grand announced her departure and was replaced by Whembley Sewell.

=== 2010–2019 ===
In July 2010, Robert Sauerberg became Condé Nast's president. In May 2011, the company was the first major publisher to deliver subscriptions for the iPad, starting with The New Yorker; the company has since rolled out iPad subscriptions for nine of its titles. In the same month, Next Issue Media, a joint venture formed by five U.S. publishers including Condé Nast, announced subscriptions for Android devices, initially available for the Samsung Galaxy Tab.

In September 2011, Condé Nast said it would offer 17 of its brands to the Kindle Fire. The company launched Conde Nast Entertainment in 2011 to develop movies, television series, and digital video programming. In May 2013, CNÉ's Digital Video Network debuted, featuring web series for such publications as Glamour and GQ. Wired joined the Digital Video Network with the announcement of five original web series including the National Security Agency satire Codefellas and the animated advice series Mister Know-It-All.

In October 2013, the company ended its internship program after being sued by two former interns claiming they had been paid less than minimum wage for summer internships there. In November 2014, the company moved into One World Trade Center in Manhattan, where its headquarters are now located. On September 14, 2015, the company announced Sauerberg as its new CEO, with former CEO Charles H. Townsend taking the role of Chairman, and S.I. Newhouse Jr. taking the role of Chairman Emeritus in January 2016. On October 13, 2015, Condé Nast announced that it had acquired Pitchfork.

In July 2016, the company announced the launch of Condé Nast Spire, a new division of the company focusing on consumer purchasing data and content consumption through the company's own first-party behavioral data. The chairman of the company, Charles Townsend, retired at the end of 2016, and the Chairman Emeritus Newhouse died the following October.

In March 2018, Condé Nast announced the launch of the influencer-based platform Next Gen. The company's chief revenue and marketing officer, Pamela Drucker Mann, stated that the platform would feature both "in-house and external talent with significant and meaningful social followings". In April 2019, Condé Nast appointed the former CEO of Pandora Media, Roger Lynch, as the company's first global CEO. It also sold the magazine Brides to the digital media company Dotdash, and in May of the same year, announced the sale of Golf Digest to Discovery, Inc. In June of the same year, Condé Nast sold W to a new holding company, Future Media Group. W editor Stefano Tonchi later sued the company for wrongful termination, with Condé Nast suing Tonchi in response, seeking the return of "all monies paid to [Tonchi] during his period of disloyalty," claiming that he had acted as a "faithless servant" during the sale of W, and had interfered with the sale to benefit himself.

Roger Lynch was appointed CEO in April 2019, and in October 2019, announced plans to increase Condé Nast's revenue from readers.

=== 2020–present ===
In June 2020, following the global outbreak of the coronavirus COVID-19, it was reported that Condé Nast had experienced a drop in advertising revenues of 45% as a result of the pandemic. It was also reported that the company had, in previous years, sublet six of the company's 23 floors in the One World Trade Center, following the cancellation of a number of its publishing titles.

In November 2023, Condé Nast announced it would be cutting about 5 percent of its workforce which would impact approximately 270 employees. Some of the reasons given for this were pressures from digital advertising, decreasing social media traffic, and shifting audience preferences towards short-form video content on platforms like TikTok and YouTube Shorts.

In January 2024, union members from the company's publications set a strike for 24 hours aligned with the announcement of 96th Academy Awards nominees claiming that the company was "engaging in regressive bargaining and breaking the law in bargaining by rescinding an offer that they had previously made around layoffs". Anne Hathaway walked out of a Vanity Fair photo shoot the same day, January 23, in solidarity with the union.

In December 2024, Condé Nast announced additional layoffs specifically targeting top executives at the company.

In October 2025, the company announced that it would no longer feature new animal fur in its editorial content or advertising. The decision followed a nine-month campaign against Condé Nast and its business partners by the Coalition to Abolish the Fur Trade and years of protests by PETA.

In November 2025, the NewsGuild of New York filed an unfair labor practice charge against Condé Nast with the National Labor Relations Board on behalf of Condé United, the union that represents most Condé Nast employees, accusing the company of wrongfully terminating four employees who were engaging in "protected concerted activity" when they confronted the company's head of human resources over layoffs at Teen Vogue.

In September 2026, it was announced that Michael Perlis, Condé Nast's lead independent board member would become the interim-CEO after the then CEO, Roger Lynch stepped down to join Mattel.

== American digital assets and publications ==
=== Digital assets ===
- Allure
- Ars Technica
- Epicurious
- Glamour
- Pitchfork
- Teen Vogue
- La Cucina Italiana
- cna.st is an internet domain name of Condé Nast/Advance.

=== Printed magazines ===
- Architectural Digest
- Bon Appétit
- Condé Nast Traveler
- GQ
- The New Yorker
- Vanity Fair
- Vogue
- Wired

== Defunct publications ==
- American Golfer
- Backchannel
- Cargo
- Cookie
- Details
- Elegant Bride
- Golf for Women
- Golf Digest
- Gourmet
- House & Garden (US)
- Jane
- Love
- Lucky
- Mademoiselle
- Men's Vogue
- Modern Bride
- NowManifest (blog)
- Portfolio Magazine
- Self
- Style.com
- Swoon.com
- Vitals Men
- Vitals Women
- World of Hibernia
- WomenSports
- YM

== International publications ==
- 安邸 Architectural Digest China
- Architectural Digest España
- Architectural Digest France
- Architectural Digest Germany
- Architectural Digest India
- Architectural Digest Italia
- Architectural Digest Latinoamérica
- Architectural Digest México
- Architectural Digest Middle East
- Architectural Digest Polska
- Condé Nast Traveler China
- Condé Nast Traveler España
- Condé Nast Traveller Germany
- Condé Nast Traveller India
- Condé Nast Traveller Italia
- Condé Nast Traveller Middle East
- Condé Nast Traveller UK
- Glamour UK
- British GQ
- British GQ Style
- GQ Australia
- GQ China
- GQ Style China
- GQ España
- GQ France
- GQ Germany
- GQ Style Germany
- GQ India
- GQ Italia
- GQ Japan
- GQ Latinoamérica
- GQ México
- GQ Poland
- GQ Taiwan
- House & Garden (UK)
- La Cucina Italiana (Italy)
- Tatler (UK)
- The World of Interiors (UK)
- Vanity Fair España
- Vanity Fair France
- Vanity Fair Italia
- Vanity Fair London
- British Vogue
- Vogue Arabia
- Vogue Australia
- Vogue China
- Vogue Film China
- Vogue Man China
- Vogue Plus China
- Vogue Deutsch
- Vogue España
- Vogue France
- Vogue India
- Vogue Italia
- Vogue Japan
- Vogue Latinoamérica
- Vogue Hombre Latinoamérica
- Vogue México
- Vogue Hombre México
- Vogue Taiwan
- Wired Japan
- Wired Latinoamérica
- Wired México
- Wired UK

== Acquisitions and mergers ==
=== Acquisitions ===
Date	Company	Business	Country	Value (USD)	Ref.
December 30, 1987	Signature Magazine (Note: Citicorp-Signature Magazine was acquired from Citigroup.)	Magazine	United States	—	
November 30, 1988	Woman (Note: Harris Publications-Woman was acquired from Harris Publications.)	Magazine	United States	$10,000,000	
June 25, 1990	Cook's (Note: Pennington Publishing-Cook's was acquired from Bonnier AB.)	Magazines	United States	—	
April 22, 1992	K-III Magazines-Magazine Sub (Note: K-III Magazines-Magazine Sub was acquired from Primedia (now Rent Group).)	Subscriber lists	United States	—	
April 20, 1993	Knapp Communications	Magazines	United States	$175,000,000	
June 12, 1998	Wired Magazine (Note: Wired Magazine was acquired from Telefonica.)	Magazines	United States	$90,000,000	
January 8, 2000	Fairchild Publications (Note: Fairchild Publications was acquired from The Walt Disney Company.)	Magazines and newspapers	United States	$650,000,000	
September 5, 2001	Johansens (Note: Johansens, the parent company of Daily Mail, was acquired from Rothermere Investments.)	Accommodation guides	United States	—	
February 28, 2002	Modern Bride Group (Note: Modern Bride Group was acquired from Primedia (now Rent Group).)	Magazines	United States	$52,000,000	
March 28, 2002	Ideas Publishing Group (Note: Ideas Publishing Group was acquired from Advance Publications.)	Publishing	United States	—	
July 11, 2006	Lycos Inc-Wired News (Note: Lycos Inc-Wired News was acquired from Telefonica.)	Online news	United States	$25,000,000	
July 20, 2006	Nutrition Data	Internet service provider	United States	—	
October 31, 2006	Reddit	Social news	United States	—	
April 23, 2008	SFO*Media	Web sites	United States	—	
May 20, 2008	Ars Technica	Web sites	United States	—	
April 11, 2012	ZipList	Web sites & Mobile Apps	United States	$14,000,000	
October 13, 2015	Pitchfork	Web sites	United States	—	

=== Stakes ===
Date	Company	Business	Country	Value (USD)	Ref.
November 29, 1988	Wagadon (Note: Conde Nast Publications acquired a 40% interest in Wagadon.)	Magazines	United States	—	
January 19, 1994	Wired Magazine	Magazines	United States	—	
January 17, 2001	Ideas Publishing Group (Note: Conde Nast Publications acquired a majority interest in Ideas Publishing Group.)	Publishing	United States	—	

== See also ==
- Genwi (2011) launch of Condé Nast's "The Daily W" app
