= Trinity: Souls of Zill O'll =

2010 video game

- European cover art
- Developer: Omega Force
- Publisher: Tecmo Koei
- Director: Tomohiko Sho
- Designer: Kenichiro Yasuda
- Composer: Yoshihiro Ike
- Series: Zill O'll
- Platform: PlayStation 3
- Release: JP: November 25, 2010; NA: February 8, 2011; EU: February 11, 2011; AU: 2011
- Genre: Action role-playing
- Mode: Single-player

Trinity: Souls of Zill O'll, known in Japan as Trinity: Zill O'll Zero (トリニティ ジルオール ゼロ, Toriniti Jiru Ōru Zero), is a 2010 action role-playing video game developed by Omega Force, a part of the Zill O'll series, which had previously appeared on PlayStation, PlayStation 2 and PlayStation Portable. The game is a prequel, taking place five years before the events in Zill O'll.

Downloadable content that included additional quests and alternate costumes for the main party was released exclusively in Japan.

== Gameplay ==
The game features a three character party system; the player is allowed to only control one character but can freely switch between each of them with a single button to perform a variety of setups and combos. For example, one character can be set to cast a spell and the player can immediately switch to another to defend the magic caster. When the character controlled by the player leads the party into a group of monsters, the two other characters may automatically assist the player's character.

All three characters can perform two group attacks: the Trinity Attack or the Soul Burst. Like the musou feature found in several Warriors games, the party will gradually build a gauge - called a Trinity Gauge - that is adjacent to their characters' face icons. The party can unleash a Trinity Attack, a destructive attack in a wider range than usual, once the gauge is filled. Trinity Attacks can be strengthened as it possesses its own leveling system. Soul Bursts are stronger attacks unleashed by the entire party, but they are trickier to take effect. It advocates for each character to attack a foe simultaneously.

Each character has a different job class (warrior, mage and assassin) or Souls. Souls are packed with the techniques and abilities that vary based on the character. When a particular Soul runs out of abilities to learn, a new Soul may replace it. Skills from various Souls can cross over to create different techniques. Magic is learned in this manner and is categorized as either air, fire, earth or water. These abilities can either be bought at a Sorcerer's Guild within a town, found as a treasure in dungeons, or earned by acclimating Skill Points (SP) from defeated enemies in battle.

Environments are fully interactive to allow players to destroy it, pick up items on the field and unlock new pathways. Cutting away the field in such a fashion can be used to the player's advantage during battles with monsters.

== Plot ==
Areus, a half elf is destined to kill the emperor, his grandfather. When the evil emperor finds out about his fate he has his pregnant daughter and Areus's father murdered. Areus's mother manages to escape to a boat with the emperor's men in hot pursuit. Many years later Areus has become an adventurer who fights in the arena in a major city in order to get stronger to avenge his father.

Along his travels Areus meets two new characters who join him and have their own back story and secrets. Finding out and having them trust him isn't as easy as it sounds.

== Development ==
The game was developed by Omega Force and published by Tecmo Koei, and released in Japan on November 25, 2010, and in North America and Europe in February 2011.

The game design from previous differs from earlier iterations of the Zill O'll franchise by replacing the turn based battles with real time combat, which allows switching between a group of three playable characters.

In an interview with Akihiro Suzuki when asked about the visual style, he explained: "We're creating a very original visual style for the game. Ultimately, Trinity will resemble what we're calling a "living painting", something along the lines of a romanticist oil painting come to life. We believe that the world of fantasy and the unique sensation of oil paintings match really well somehow, so we are going to try and have a go at this mixture for the visuals. We looked at structures and architecture from our own world, both from ancient history and modern day, and pulled inspiration from different cultures and mythologies. In many ways, the game world we created for Trinity is a reflection of our own planet and the differences on it".

The games logo uses the Ouroboros which symbolizes self-reflexivity, cyclicality, re-creation, and things beginning anew as soon as they end similar to the phoenix.

=== Related media ===
During the Neoroma & Musou radio program a pre-recorded commercial for the game routinely plays at breaks. The director attended a live broadcast to answer basic questions of the gameplay. He also performed a similar task at the twentieth episode of Niconico Live Game no Jikan.

In November 2010, Omega Force began an illustration contest for Trinity: Souls of Zill O'll as a collaboration project with Nico Nico Seiga. Interested participants either drew any character of the game they wanted or illustrated a picture that emphasizes a bond shared between any of the characters. The "most excellent" and "notable" pieces could be entered as guest illustrations with full artist recognition. Players needed to complete specially marked quests to see the fan created pictures but their art would be in the game's actual gallery. The "most excellent" winner additionally won Zill Ơll merchandise for their efforts, which sets them apart from other winners. The contest lasted until January 10, 11:59 PM. Contest winners can now be seen on the contest page.

Dream's collaboration for the game was revealed at TGS 2010, where they performed their songs, Breakout and My Way ~ULala~ on stage. The image song will be on Dream's album Hands Up!, which also has an alternative TRINITY: Zill Ơll Zero version. The ladies also demonstrated the title's Time Attack event for those in the audience. The musical unit also had a video message for fans at the October talk show event, stating they felt closely to the game's theme in their own group. If the player inputs a specially marked number code on their booklets in the game, they will gain three exclusive weapons for their party. Players could do this until March 31, 2011.

== Reception ==
Reception

Aggregate score
Aggregator	Score
Metacritic	55/100

Review scores
Publication	Score
Destructoid	3/10
Famitsu	32/40
G4	2/5
Game Informer	6/10
GamePro	1/5
GameSpot	6.5/10
GameZone	6/10
IGN	5/10
PALGN	4/10
PlayStation: The Official Magazine	7/10

The game received "mixed or average" reviews according to the review aggregation website Metacritic. G4 praised the combat, but noted a lack of depth in all other areas. GameSpot stated: "Trinity: Souls of Zill O'll offers such varied and satisfying combat that it's easy to lose dozens of hours while you cleanse the world of evil", but added: "The setup has been done before, and Trinity doesn't offer interesting twists to make this tale compelling". In Japan, Famitsu gave it a score of one nine, two eights, and one seven for a total of 32 out of 40.
