= Nosferatu (video game) =

1994 video game

- Japanese cover art by Jun Suemi
- Developer: SETA Corporation
- Publisher: SETA Corporation
- Programmers: T. Nakamura; Hiroki Azumada; Yoshihiro Ando; Tetsuo Mochizuki
- Artists: Kōji Isoda; Kōzō Igarashi; Shingo Aoyama
- Composer: Masanao Akahori
- Platform: Super NES
- Release: JP: October 7, 1994; NA: July 1995
- Genres: Action, platform
- Mode: Single-player

Nosferatu (Japanese: ノスフェラトゥ, Hepburn: Nosuferatu) is a horror-themed action platform game developed and published by SETA Corporation for the Super Nintendo Entertainment System. It was released in Japan on October 7, 1994, and in North America in October 1995.

The player controls a young man known as Kyle, who rides to the vampire Nosferatu's castle in order to defeat him and save his beloved girlfriend Erin from his clutches.

== Plot ==
The game follows the story of a young man named Kyle who has his girlfriend Erin sequestered with the vampire Nosferatu (in the opening cutscene of the Japanese version, he is also referred to as Count Dracula); he has the objective of obtaining their blood. Kyle then goes up to the castle where Nosferatu lurks with the intent to rescue Erin, but getting there, he discovers that the huge place is full of traps and violent creatures. The game starts with Kyle being trapped in the dungeon of the castle, and the player must escape from there and walk through the castle until they reach the tower where Erin and Nosferatu are.

== Gameplay ==
The player fights the ape bosses of the second stage.

The game is played like Prince of Persia, however the player fights with his bare fists. Despite that, they can use many unique moves and special combos with attacking. He fights various monsters such as Frankenstein's monsters, zombies, gargoyles, ghosts, and robots. There are 7 bosses in the game they are the Werewolf, 2 Apemen, Ghoul, A Mud Elemental, Rock Golem and Count Dracula Himself as the final boss. There are three types of crystals used in the game in addition to an hourglass. Finding an hourglass extends the in-game time. Each crystal has its own abilities: red crystals give players a power-up at every three crystals, green crystals recover the health of the player while the blue crystal extends the player's health bar. The ending to the game will change if the player has died at least eight times by the time they complete the game.

== Development and release ==
Nosferatu was programmed by T. Nakamura, Hiroki Azumada, Yoshihiro Ando and Tetsuo Mochizuki. Kōji Isoda, Kōzō Igarashi and Shingo Aoyama served as graphic designers. Opus Corp handled the audio for the game, with Masanao Akahori composing the music, and Jun Enoki creating the sound effects. Nosferatu was released by SETA Corporation on October 7, 1994, in Japan. This was followed by its North American release in October 1995.

== Reception ==
Reception

Review scores
Publication	Score
AllGame	3/5
Computer and Video Games	72/100
Electronic Gaming Monthly	7/10, 6.5/10, 6.5/10, 7/10
Game Informer	6.75/10
GameFan	85/100, 80/100, 88/100
Official Nintendo Magazine	79/100
Super Play	75%
Total!	70/100
Games Amusement Pleasure	70%
Super Gamer	78/100

According to Famitsu, Nosferatu sold 8,383 copies in its first week on the market and 16,608 copies during its lifetime in Japan. The game received a 21.2/30 score in a readers' poll conducted by Super Famicom Magazine. It also received generally favorable reviews from critics.

GamePro's Mike Weigand judged the game to be a frustratingly difficult but still worthwhile cinematic platformer. He elaborated that the game is frustrating due to the sometimes slow character movements and lack of any password or save function, and that the strong atmosphere and slow-paced, strategic approach are its strong points. Electronic Gaming Monthly's four editors found the graphics and sound to be impressive, but they all complained about frustrations resulting from poor responsiveness in the controls. They all also said that the game was something of a disappointment in light of how long it had spent in development and how heavily hyped it had been. AllGame's Brett Alan Weiss praised the graphics and audio, making the game "imbued with cinematic style and flair", but criticized its controls. He also derided the game's combat, which he considered "redundant and largely unexciting".
