= Once Upon a Time in the Woods =

Once upon A Time in the Woods
- Directed by: Benjamin Arthur
- Starring: Julian Arthur, Ian Arthur, Benjamin Arthur
- Music by: Jonathan Arthur
- Animation by: Benjamin Arthur
- Color process: Black-and-white
- Production company: Still Life Studios
- Release date: August 12, 2006
- Language: English

Once Upon A Time in the Woods is a rotoscoped animated short by film-maker Benjamin Arthur. The short became popular on YouTube, and was reviewed positively by USA Today's Tech blog, as well as being featured in IDN (International Designer's Network Magazine), and multiple film festivals around the world. As of 2011, it has had over one million views on YouTube. The animated short also airs on a regular basis on the cable TV channel Current TV

== Synopsis ==
The animated short follows a six-year-old child as he runs through the woods, and begins a monologue about his previous life as a tree. He explains graphically what a tree feels when it is chopped down.

== Notes and comments ==
The video sparked debate on YouTube and other websites on the issues of global warming and clearcutting. For almost a year it remained one of the top 100 most commented films on YouTube. It is notable for the original rotoscope process created by the artist, which is currently being used in the curriculum of several universities.
