= Roger Lynch =

American business executive (born 1962)

- Born: October 24, 1962 (age 64); Baltimore, Maryland, U.S.
- Education: Dartmouth College (MBA); University of Southern California (BSc)
- Occupation: CEO of Mattel Formerly CEO of Condé Nast
- Children: 3

Roger Lynch (born October 24, 1962) is an American business executive who was chief executive officer of Condé Nast from 2019 to 2026. In September 2026, Mattel named him its next chairman and chief executive officer; he became chairman on October 2 and is due to become chief executive officer by November 2. Since joining Condé Nast in 2019, Lynch has been responsible for integrating the media company's U.S. and international businesses.

== Early life ==
Lynch spent much of his childhood in Baltimore, Maryland, where he had his first job at the age of 10 delivering newspapers. He studied at Loyola Blakefield in Baltimore.

He attended the University of Southern California and received a Bachelor of Science in physics. After graduation, he spent time working in aerospace and defense before enrolling at the Tuck School of Business for an MBA, where he graduated with highest distinction. After earning his MBA, he started working in technology investment banking at Morgan Stanley.

== Career ==
In 1999, Lynch was named president and CEO of Chello Broadband in Amsterdam, after which he became chairman and CEO of Video Networks International Ltd., an IPTV provider based in the UK.

Lynch joined Dish Networks in 2009, where he became the founding CEO of Sling TV, overseeing the platform's launch in 2015.

In 2017, Lynch was named president and CEO of Pandora, where he led the music streaming service to accelerated revenue growth and positive returns. Pandora was sold to SiriusXM in February 2019.

Lynch became CEO of Condé Nast in April 2019. In his first eight months, the company launched new editions of its titles in several countries around the world and made public commitments to reduce its environmental impact. Lynch also established a new global leadership team charged with helping the business expand worldwide, and in December 2020, he unveiled the company's new global content strategy.

Lynch is a member of the board of directors for Condé Nast, Mattel, the board of advisors at the Tuck School at Dartmouth College and the board of councilors at the Dornsife College of Letters, Arts and Sciences at the University of Southern California.

== Personal life ==
Lynch lives with his wife in New York City. He has three children. He plays the lead guitar in an all-CEO rock band. He has another home in Lake Arrowhead, California.
