= Enterprise mobile application =

Data hunter

The term enterprise mobile application is used in the context of mobile apps created/brought by individual organizations for their workers to carry out the functions required to run the organization. It is the process of building a mobile application for the requirements of an enterprise.

An enterprise mobile application belonging to an organization is expected to be used by only the workers of that organization. The definition of enterprise mobile application does not include the mobile apps that an organization create for its customers or consumers of the products or services generated by the organization.

== Example ==
An organization, whether for-profit or non-profit, may create a mobile app for its members to track inventory levels of supplies they distribute to their target communities or materials used in product manufacturing. Such a mobile app comes under the definition of enterprise mobile application. However, the same organization may also create another mobile app to sell their products to end users or spread awareness of their services to various communities, and that mobile app would not come under definition of enterprise mobile application.

== Enterprise mobile solution providers ==
Enterprise Mobile solution providers create and develop apps for individual organizations that can buy instead of creating the apps themselves. Reasons for Organizations buying the apps include time and cost savings, technical expertise. Today Enterprise Mobility is playing track role for enterprise transformation. Today, enterprises needs productivity is a fast way. Enterprise mobility helps business owners to build their work in a progressive way by assisting enterprise mobility solutions.

== See also ==
- Enterprise application integration
- Enterprise software
- Mobile app
