= Zill O'll =

1999 video game

- Developer: Koei
- Publisher: Koei
- Platforms: PlayStation; PlayStation 2 PlayStation Portable
- Release: JP: October 7, 1999; Infinite: JP: June 23, 2005; Infinite Plus: JP: January 22, 2009
- Genre: Role-playing
- Mode: Single-player

Zill O'll (Note: Japanese: ジルオール, Hepburn: Jiruōru) is a role-playing video game developed and published by Koei for the PlayStation. It saw a Japan-only release on October 7, 1999, and a re-release in 2000 under the "Koei the Best" line. A remake called Zill O'll Infinite was released in 2005 on the PlayStation 2, while an updated version of the remake called Zill O'll Infinite Plus was released in 2009 for the PlayStation Portable. A prequel, Trinity: Souls of Zill O'll, was released in 2010 for PlayStation 3.

While superficially similar to Final Fantasy franchises, the game has character creation and a nonlinear scenario system that allows the plot, including the ending, to be affected by player decisions, with time passing when moving from place to place. Non-player characters can die depending on the player's involvement in their quest. Nevertheless, it was poorly received in the West and seen as a Final Fantasy clone, ultimately never being localized.

== Release ==
Zill O'll was the 4th best-selling video game in Japan for the week between October 4, 1999, and October 10, 1999.

== Reception ==
The game's turn-based combat and other gameplay was often compared to the Final Fantasy series by critics. In a preview of the game for Tokyo Game Show 1998, Console Plus called the game's graphics more detailed than FFVII, and remarked on its "superb" cutscenes. Christian Nutt of GameSpot rated the game 4.8/10 points, calling it "Koei's Final Fantasy". Saying it had "very little original content", he characterized the graphics as "quite mediocre". While praising the fact that individual enemies were visible in dungeons, he nevertheless said that they moved "lethargically" and were easily avoided. New Zealand Station called the game "highly unoriginal" and "a straight rip off from Final Fantasy", saying that it "thankfully" had not made it to local shores.

Dengeki Online praised the game's high degree of freedom in an anniversary feature, remarking on how the player could change the story and which party members joined.

== Remakes ==
Zill O'll Infinite and Infinite Plus were remakes of the original game, released for PS2 and PSP, respectively, with new elements.
