= Appbox Pro =

Multipurpose App for iPhone, iPad, and iPod Touch

App Box
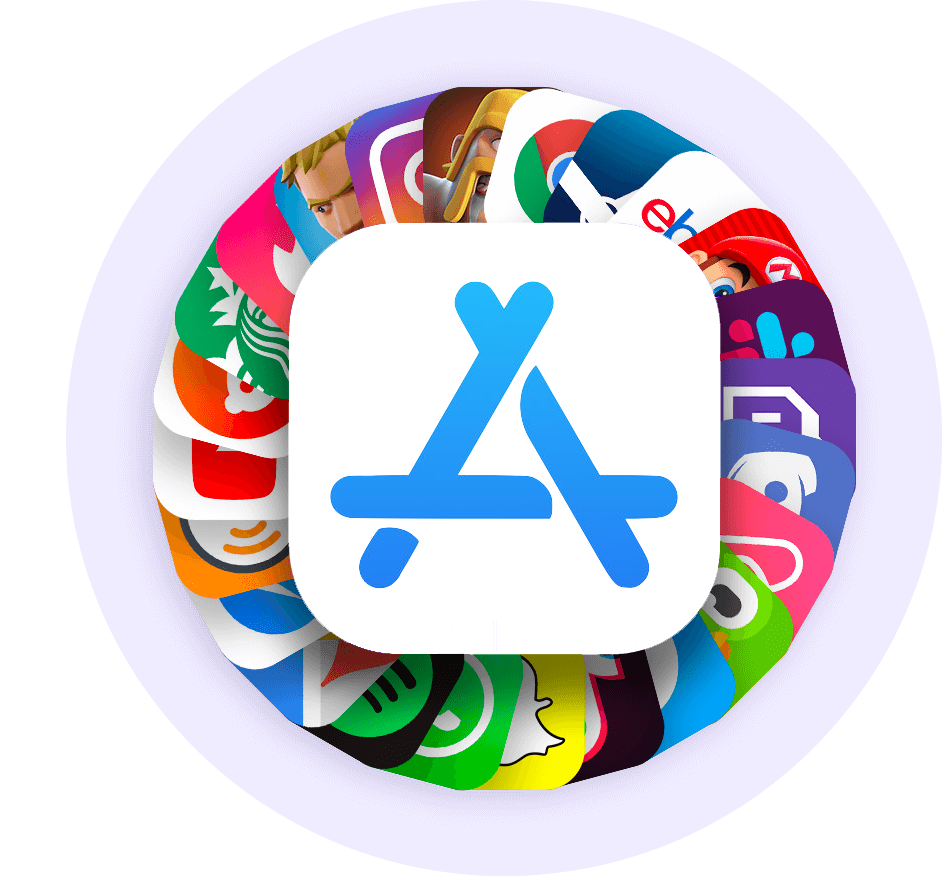
- appbox.pro
- Developer: Rosetta Stone
- Release: September 18, 2009
- Stable release: 2.0 / March 22, 2024; 2 years ago
- Operating system: iOS
- Platform: ARM: iPhone, iPod Touch, iPad
- Available in: Russian, English, Chinese, French, German, Italian, Japanese, Korean, Polish, Spanish
- Type: Multipurpose app
- License: Commercial
- Website: app.theappbox.ru

App Box is a multipurpose application for the iPhone, iPad, and iPod Touch. The application combines 28 single purpose applications into one.

It has a password-protected digital wallet, tip calculator, dice for random choosing, date calculator, days until countdown, holiday calendars from 104 nations, translator with 53 languages (42 spoken), unit converter, bubble level, ruler, mirror, currency converter, price comparison tool, sale price/tax calculator, loan calculator, menses tracker, a link to Google docs, horoscope, rock paper scissors, budgeting tools, a Kaomoji chooser and more.

The most recent update was on the 4th of September 2025 with version 4.8.7.

The app has an average rating of 3.4 out of 5 on the Apple App Store.
