= Brandish (series) =

- Genre: Action role-playing
- Developer: Nihon Falcom
- First release: Brandish; 1991
- Latest release: Brandish 4; 1996

Brandish (Japanese: ブランディッシュ, romanized: Burandisshu) is a series of action role-playing video games by Nihon Falcom.

== Brandish ==
The original Brandish video game was released in 1991 for the NEC PC-9801 and FM Towns. It was later ported to the Super Nintendo Entertainment System (Super NES) and PC Engine CD-ROM² in 1994–1995, including an expanded re-release titled Brandish Renewal; the Super NES version was published by Koei in Japan in 1994 and in North America in 1995. A complete remake of the original Brandish for the PlayStation Portable (PSP), featuring 3D graphics and titled Brandish: The Dark Revenant, was published by Nihon Falcom in Japan in 2009 and Xseed Games released a localized version on the PlayStation Store in 2015. Brandish Renewal was later re-released on Nintendo Switch in August 2025 as part of the EGG Console line by D4 Enterprise.

== Brandish 2 ==
The original game proved popular enough in Japan to warrant two direct sequels exclusively in Japan that continued the adventures of Ares and Dela. The first one was Brandish 2: The Planet Buster, originally released for the PC-98 in 1993 and ported to the Super Famicom (SNES) in 1995 (like Falcom's later Ys V, the game was released in "normal" and "expert" difficulty versions).

The Super Famicom and PC-98 versions received fan translations in 2009 and 2017 respectively.

== Brandish 3 ==
The next sequel was Brandish 3: Spirit of Balcan, originally released for the PC-98 in 1994.

== Brandish 4 ==
Brandish 3 was followed by Brandish VT, originally released in 1996 and renamed Brandish 4: The Tower of Sleeping God when it was re-released for Windows in 1998. This final game follows a similar gameplay format, now with isometric graphics, but with completely different storyline and characters.

== Crossovers ==
Dela makes an appearance in Falcom's 2010 Ys vs. Trails in the Sky as a support character.
