= Sherwin Siy =

American attorney (1980–2021)

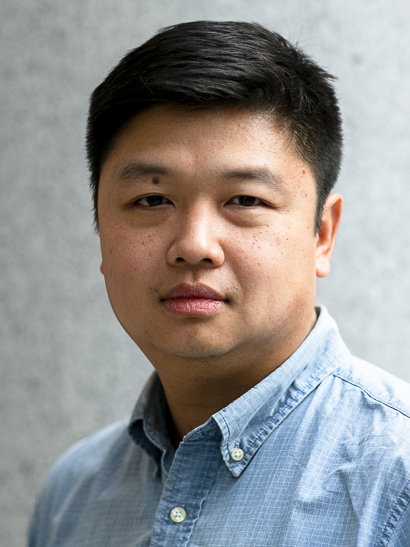
- Siy in 2019
- Born: July 29, 1980; Houston, Texas, U.S.
- Died: July 7, 2021 (aged 40); North Carolina, U.S.
- Education: Bachelor of Arts (Stanford University); Juris Doctor (University of California, Berkeley).

Statement of Sherwin Siy (during his time at the Wikimedia Foundation) Before the United States Senate Committee on the Judiciary Subcommittee on Intellectual Property - 'How Does the DMCA Contemplate Limitations and Exceptions Like Fair Use?'

Sherwin Siy (July 29, 1980 – July 7, 2021) was an American lawyer and activist who served as the lead public policy manager at the Wikimedia Foundation. He was an adjunct lecturer at George Washington University Law School and an adjunct instructor at American University School of Communication. He previously served as vice-president of legal affairs at the Washington, D.C.–based digital rights group Public Knowledge and as a special counsel for the Federal Communications Commission. He died of natural causes in North Carolina on July 7, 2021.

== Biography ==
Sherwin graduated with a Bachelor of Arts degree from Stanford University, and earned a Juris Doctor degree from University of California, Berkeley, School of Law.
