= Brandish (video game) =

1991 video game

- PC-98 cover art by Nobuteru Yūki
- Developers: Nihon Falcom; Mantra (DOS); NEC (PC Engine CD-ROM²); Koei (SNES)
- Publishers: Nihon Falcom (PC-9801, FM Towns, PSP); Mantra (DOS); NEC (PC Engine CD-ROM²); Koei (SNES)
- Director: Yoshio Kiya
- Producer: Masayuki Kato
- Programmer: Yukio Takahashi
- Artists: Isutoshi; Tsuyoshi Matsumuro; Hidekazu Suzuki
- Composers: Tenmon; Mieko Ishikawa
- Series: Brandish
- Platforms: PC-9801, FM Towns, Super NES, PC Engine CD-ROM²
- Release: NEC PC-9801, FM Towns: JP: October 25, 1991; PC Engine CD-ROM²: JP: June 17, 1994; SNES: JP: June 25, 1994; NA: February 1995; Brandish Renewal: JP: October 3, 1995
- Genre: Action role-playing
- Mode: Single-player

Brandish is a 1991 action role-playing game developed and published by Nihon Falcom. Originally released in 1991 for the NEC PC-9801 and FM Towns, it was later ported to the Super NES and PC Engine CD-ROM² in the mid 1990s, including an expanded re-release titled Brandish Renewal. The game was the first in the Brandish series and was followed by three sequels. A remake, Brandish: The Dark Revenant, was released for the PlayStation Portable in Japan in 2009 and worldwide in 2015.

== Gameplay ==
PC-98 version screenshot

Brandish is a top-down view dungeon crawler game. The original version of the game uses mouse controls from a real-time overhead view, where the player can move the warrior character Ares (known as Varik in the English version of the SNES port) forward and backward, turn, strafe, and attack by clicking on boxes surrounding the player character. The player's objective is to escape from a labyrinth of over 40 floors in 5 different areas such as the 'Ruins', 'Tower', 'Cave', 'Dark Zone', and 'Fortress', each filled with various monsters, traps and puzzles.

Brandish: The Dark Revenant turns the game's female antagonist Dela Delon (known as Alexis in the English version of the SNES port) into an optional alternate player character. Dela, a magician, plays differently from the protagonist, Ares the warrior. The game's "Dela Mode" is shorter (lasting about 10 hours as compared to some 20 hours with Ares) but harder than the main scenario.

== Plot ==
A long time ago, the small kingdom of Vittoria was built around a lofty tower, which pierced the sky. The people of the city, guarded by a mighty Dragon, lived in peace and abundance. However, King Bistalle, the ruler of Vittoria, desired to expand his kingdom and ordered the scholars to research the Tower. Soon he was brought a tome written in an ancient language. As they were deciphering the tome, some scholars feared that they might be laying their hands on the forbidden knowledge of the ancients. The tome reads: "The Great Guardian of Vittoria, the Dragon, and the Essence of Power lies in the top of the Tower; the one who possesses the Essence will possess all". Undaunted by these otherwise ominous words, Bistalle decided to make this Essence of Power his own. He secretly organized an army which soon attacked the Tower and overwhelmed the Dragon. But as Bistalle grasped at the Essence of Power, the Dragon gave up its own life to destroy it. The Essence, losing control, transformed the King into a hideous monster and sank the entire kingdom of Vittoria, including the great tower, under the ground. All people on the surface forgot about Vittoria and the Tower in its center, and a thousand years passed.

One day, a swordsman named Ares is pursued by his nemesis, the sorceress Dela Delon who seeks revenge for his slaying of her master. When Dela catches up with Ares and attacks, her magic causes the ground beneath them to collapse and both fall into the cursed Ruins of Vittoria. The player assumes the role of Ares and must escape from the dangerous ruin, with the vengeful Dela constantly in pursuit of him. She is also interested in escaping the maze herself and the two meet repeatedly. The ending changes slightly depending on whether or not Ares helps her out of danger during certain events late in the game.

== Release ==
Originally released by Nihon Falcom in 1991 for the NEC PC-9801 and FM Towns home computers (and also ported to MS-DOS exclusively in Korea by Mantra and Ssangyong in 1996), Brandish was later released for the Super Nintendo Entertainment System (SNES) and PC Engine CD-ROM². The PC Engine version was published by NEC and features CD quality music as well as vocal dialogue and narration. The PC-98 version was re-released as Brandish Renewal in 1995, with some new music and hard drive support.

The SNES port is the only English language version of the game ever released (excluding the PSP remake). It was published by Koei in 1994 in Japan and a few months later (February 1995) in North America. Due to Nintendo of America's policies at that time, the game was regionally censored in its depiction of Dela's revealing costume and the plot was considerably altered; these changes would later get fan-made ROM hacks reverting them along with the names.

Brandish Renewal was later re-released on Nintendo Switch on August 14, 2025, as part of the EGG Console line by D4 Enterprise.

== Reception ==
Reception

Aggregate score
Aggregator	Score	
Aggregator	SNES	TurboGrafx-16
GameRankings	68%	

Review scores
Publication	Score	
Publication	SNES	TurboGrafx-16
Famitsu	7/10, 7/10; 7/10, 7/10	8/10, 5/10; 8/10, 6/10
HonestGamers	8 / 10	
RPGFan	75%	
VG&CE	7 / 10	

GamePro gave the SNES version a mixed review, commenting that the combat, though simplistic, is "more fun than it sounds". They criticized the "practically nonexistent" sound effects and repetitive music, and complained that the way the automap does not rotate along with the scenery is confusing, but concluded that the game's long length and addictive maze-crawling make it worthwhile. They gave it ratings of 4.0 for control, 3.5 for graphics, 2.5 for sound, and 4.5 out of 5 for funfactor. VideoGames gave it a score of 7 out of 10; while noting its relatively weak graphics, the magazine called its gameplay as "solid". RPGFan gave it an overall score of 75%.

== Brandish: The Dark Revenant ==
Brandish: The Dark Revenant
- Japanese box art
- Developer: Nihon Falcom
- Publisher: Xseed Games: JP: Nihon Falcom
- Series: Brandish
- Platform: PlayStation Portable
- Release: JP: March 19, 2009; NA: January 13, 2015; PAL: April 15 2015
- Genre: Action role-playing
- Mode: Single-player

A comparison montage of gameplay screenshots from the SNES version (above) and the PSP remake (below)

Brandish: The Dark Revenant is a 3D remake of Brandish developed by Nihon Falcom for the PlayStation Portable. It was released in Japan in 2009 and worldwide by Xseed Games in 2015.

=== Reception ===
Reception

Aggregate scores
Aggregator	Score
GameRankings	79%
Metacritic	78%

Review scores
Publication	Score
Destructoid	8 / 10
Eurogamer	4/5
Gamer.nl	8.5 / 10
Gaming Age	B+
Hardcore Gamer	4.5 / 5
Push Square	7 / 10
RPG Site	7 / 10

Kurt Kalata of Hardcore Gaming 101 was positive to the game, calling the PSP version as the definitive version of the first Brandish, and the best game in the series. The English version of Brandish: The Dark Revenant received generally favorable reviews with a Metacritic score of 78%. It got an 8/10 from Destructoid, a 4.5/5 from Hardcore Gamer, and four out of five stars from USgamer. Other review scores included B+ from Gaming Age, 7/10 from Push Square, 79% from RPGFan, and 7/10 from RPG Site.

== Related media ==
Brandish Storybook (ブランディッシュ・ストーリーブック) (ISBN 978-4944000142) is a novelization of the game, co-authored by Katsunori Inoue and Suzuki Noriyuki and published in 1992. The story is told from the perspectives of both Ares and Dela. Another novel, Brandish Ares: Yobisamasu Unmei (ブランディッシュ・アレス 呼び覚ます運命) (ISBN 978-4893661463), is a prequel for the game, originally published in 1993. It was later made available for free (in Japanese) at Falcom's official website.

Several soundtracks with the music from the game were also released, including Perfect Collection Brandish (KICA1102) and Falcom Neo Classic (KICA1114-5) in 1992, Falcom Special Box '93 (KICA9012-5) and Falcom Ending Collection 1987–1992 (KICA1132-3) in 1993, Brandish Piano Collection (KICA1153) in 1994, Falcom Special Box '96 (KICA9026-28) in 1996, Falcom Classics (KICA1201) in 1997, and Brandish ~The Dark Revenant~ Original Sound Track (NW10102800) and Brandish Original Sound Track ～FM TOWNS & Renewal～ (BR-OST-FR) in 2009.

1995's audio drama CD Drama Brandish Gaiden (CDドラマ ブランディッシュ外伝) features voice acting by Yasunori Matsumoto (Ares), Kikuko Inoue (Dela), Junko Iwao, Yūko Mizutani, Kyōko Hikami, Yūko Miyamura, Minoru Inaba, Ryōtarō Okiayu, Yuri Amano, Kaori, Jūrōta Kosugi and Masako Katsuki (the cast is different from in the game's PC Engine CD-ROM² version). The drama was released as a part of Falcom Special Box '96 and Falcom Special Box '97 (KICA9029-31).

== Legacy ==
Brandish proved popular enough in Japan to warrant two direct sequels exclusively in Japan that continued the adventures of Ares and Dela: 1993's Brandish 2: The Planet Buster and 1994's Brandish 3: Spirit of Balcan. Another game, 1996's Brandish VT (Brandish 4), features a new story and characters. Dela also makes an appearance as a support character in Falcom's Ys vs. Trails in the Sky (2010), and her costume was added to Rachel's wardrobe in Dead or Alive 5 Last Round.
