= Ninja Sex Party discography =

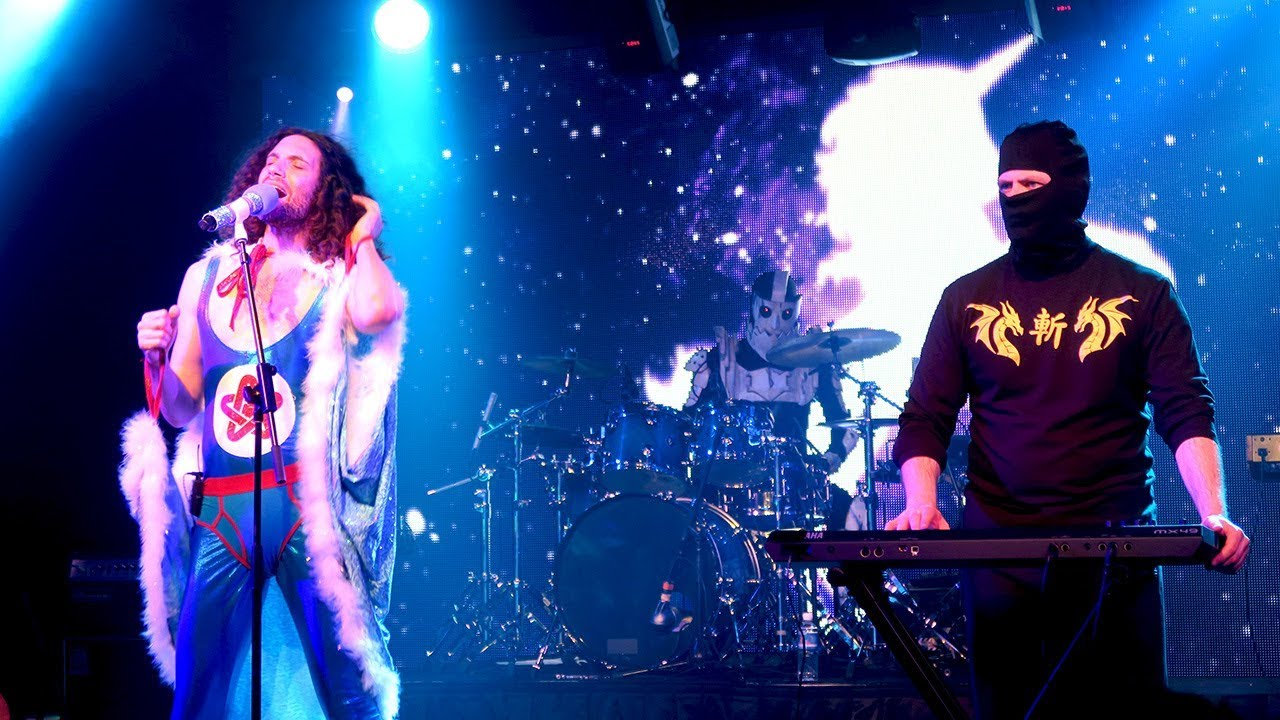
- Ninja Sex Party performing in Hawaii in 2019
- Studio albums: 10
- Live albums: 1
- Compilation albums: 1
- Singles: 29
- Music videos: 58
- Cover Albums: 4
- Live Albums: 1
- Rerecorded Albums: 1

Ninja Sex Party is a musical comedy duo based in Los Angeles, consisting of Dan Avidan and Brian Wecht.

== Albums ==
=== Studio albums ===
Title	Details	Peak chart positions							
Title	Details	US Albums	US Com.	US Ind.	US Rock	CAN	AUS	IRL Ind.	SCO
NSFW	Released: September 29, 2011; Label: Self-released; Formats: Digital, CD	56	1	5	—	—	—	—	—
Strawberries and Cream	Released: April 15, 2013; Label: Self-released; Formats: Digital, CD	56	1	5	—	—	—	—	—
Attitude City	Released: July 17, 2015; Label: Self-released; Formats: Digital, CD	56	1	5	—	—	—	—	—
Under the Covers (Cover Album)	Released: March 4, 2016; Label: Self-released; Formats: Digital, CD	17	—	2	3	73	82	18	65
Under the Covers, Vol. II (Cover Album)	Released: October 27, 2017; Label: Self-released; Formats: Digital, CD	19	—	1	2	89	—	—	—
Cool Patrol	Released: August 17, 2018; Label: Self-released; Formats: Digital, CD	21	1	1	2	—	—	—	—
Under the Covers, Vol. III (Cover Album)	Released: November 15, 2019; Label: Self-released; Formats: Digital, CD	42	—	—	3	—	— (Note: Under the Covers, Vol. III did not enter the ARIA Albums Chart, but peaked at number 12 on the ARIA Digital Album Chart.)	—	—
The Prophecy	Released: October 16, 2020; Label: Self-released; Formats: Digital, CD; Track listing: 1. Intro (The); 2. The Mystic Crystal; 1. I. Overture; 2. II. The Pleasure Orb; 3. III. Danny's Soliloquy; 4. IV. The Crossroads of Dragonbarf; 5. V. At the Peak of Mt. Nasty; 6. VI. Lovenut Meadows; 7. VII. Huzzah!; 3. It's Bedtime; 4. The Wishing Bear; 5. I Don't Know What We're Talking About (And I Haven't for a While); 6. Welcome to My Parents' House; 7. Wondering Tonight; 8. Ninja Brian's Kids Album; 9. The Decision Part 2: Ten Years Later; 10. Do Math with U 11. Thunder & Lightning; 12. Outro (Prophecy)	—	1	—	—	—	—	—	—
These Nuts	Released: March 8, 2024; Label: Self-released; Formats: Digital, CD, LP; Track listing: 1. Intro (These); 2. Get Ready (To Get Ready); 3. I Own a Car; 4. Let's Save the Earth; 5. Dance 'Til You Stop; 6. My Pet Python; 7. Death Metal; 8. Sports Anthem; 9. Seatbelts!; 10. Nut Heat; 11. Behind the Mask; 12. Dig Ol' Bick; 13. Galaxy Hamster; 14. The Boner of Peace (Part 3 of the Boner Trilogy); 15. Outro (Nuts)	—	2	—	—	—	—	—	—
Masterstrokes: 15 Years of Elegance	Released: November 16, 2024; Label: Self-released; Formats: Digital, CD, LP; Track listing: 1. Dinosaur Laser Fight; 2. If We Were Gay; 3. No Reason Boner; 4. The Decision; 5. FYI I Wanna F Your A 6. Unicorn Wizard; 7. Everybody Shut Up (I Have an Erection); 8. Next to You; 9. Dragon Slayer; 10. 6969; 11. Attitude City; 12. Road Trip; 13. Why I Cry; 14. Danny Don't You Know; 15. Cool Patrol; 16. First Date; 17. Orgy for One; 18. Release the Kraken; 19. Welcome to My Parents' House; 20. I Don't Know What We're Talking About (and I Haven't for a While); 21. The Mystic Crystal; 22. Thunder & Lightning	—	9	—	—	—	—	—	—
Under the Covers, Vol. IV (Cover Album)	Released: October 10, 2025; Label: Self-released; Formats: Digital, CD, LP; Track listing: 1. The Power of Love; 2. Just What I Needed; 3. Rosanna; 4. Don't You (Forget About Me); 5. Walk the Dinosaur; 6. Alone; 7. What a Fool Believes; 8. Invisible Touch; 9. Can't Fight This Feeling; 10. Life's What You Make It; 11. SOS; 12. Hey Jude	—	—	—	—	—	—	—	—

=== Rerecordings ===
Title	Details	Peak chart positions	
Title	Details	US Com.	US Rock
Level Up	Released: October 22, 2021; Label: Self-released; Formats: Digital, CD, LP	2	43

=== Live albums ===
Title	Details
The Very, Very, Very, Very Classy Acoustic Album	Released: December 27, 2021; Label: Self-released; Formats: Digital, LP, CD

== Singles ==
=== As lead artist ===
Year	Title	Peak chart positions	Album
Year	Title	US Rock Dig. Sales	Album
2011	"Dinosaur Laser Fight"	—	NSFW
2011	"FYI I Wanna F Your A"	—	Strawberries and Cream
2012	"Next to You"	—	Strawberries and Cream
2012	"Unicorn Wizard"	—	Strawberries and Cream
2013	"Dick Figures: The Movie: The Song"	—	Dick Figures: The Movie
2013	"Party of Three"	—	Attitude City
2014	"Dragon Slayer"	—	Attitude City
2014	"Attitude City"	—	Attitude City
2014	"Why I Cry"	—	Attitude City
2014	"Peppermint Creams"	—	Attitude City
2015	"Road Trip"	—	Attitude City
2016	"Cool Patrol"	—	Cool Patrol
2017	"Eating Food in the Shower"	—	Cool Patrol
2018	"Orgy for One"	—	Cool Patrol
2018	"Danny Don't You Know"	24	Cool Patrol
2018	"Heart Boner"	—	Cool Patrol
2019	"We Built This City"	—	Under The Covers, Vol. III
2019	"Down Under"	—	Under The Covers, Vol. III
2019	"The Mystic Crystal"	—	The Prophecy
2019	"The Decision Part 2"	—	The Prophecy
2020	"I Don't Know What We're Talking About"	—	The Prophecy
2020	"Thunder & Lightning"	—	The Prophecy
2020	"Wondering Tonight"	—	The Prophecy
2020	"Welcome to My Parents' House"	—	The Prophecy
2021	"6969 (Level Up)"	—	Level Up
2021	"Dinosaur Laser Fight (Level Up)"	—	Level Up
2023	"I Own A Car"	—	These Nuts
2023	"Let's Save The Earth"	—	These Nuts
2024	"Galaxy Hamster"	—	These Nuts
2025	"Zombie Handjob"	—	—

=== As featured artist ===
Year	Title	Album
2015	"The Hit" (Tupper Ware Remix Party feat. Ninja Sex Party)	2nite
2015	"Baby, NYC" (Tupper Ware Remix Party feat. Ninja Sex Party)	Believe in Your Dreams
2016	"The No Pants Dance" (Tupper Ware Remix Party feat. Ninja Sex Party)	Guardians of the Zone
2017	"Built 4 Love" (Tupper Ware Remix Party feat. Ninja Sex Party)	Ladyworld
2019	"Self Care Sunday" (FLULA feat. Ninja Sex Party)	—
2020	"My Own Worst Enemy" (NateWantsToBattle feat. Ninja Sex Party)	THNKS FR MR CVRS
