= Cool Patrol (song) =

Single by Ninja Sex Party

from the album Cool Patrol
- Released: October 18, 2016
- Studio: Various: Palmquist Studios; (Los Angeles, California); Santa Monica Recordings; (Santa Monica, California)
- Genre: Comedy rock
- Length: 3:16
- Label: Self-released
- Songwriters: Dan Avidan; Brian Wecht
- Producer: Jim Roach

Ninja Sex Party singles chronology
"Road Trip" (2015)	"Cool Patrol" (2016)	"Eating Food in the Shower" (2017)

"Cool Patrol" is a song by American musical comedy duo Ninja Sex Party. It was released as a single along with a music video on October 18, 2016, and is the first single from their sixth studio album, released on August 17, 2018.

Written by band members Dan Avidan and Brian Wecht, the song tells the story of Danny Sexbang and Ninja Brian, who, calling themselves the "Cool Patrol", help a bullied high-schooler become tougher and cooler. It is the band's first release with producer Jim Roach, and their first original song to feature TWRP as backup band. The music video features YouTube personality Jacksepticeye as the bullied kid; he also provides minor spoken parts in the song.

The song reached #1 on the iTunes Comedy chart.

== Production ==
The song was released as a single on October 18, 2016, almost two years before the release of the eponymous album.

== Music video ==
The music video was filmed in June 2016 and released on October 18, 2016 along with the single. It was originally announced five days earlier on October 13. It was directed and edited by regular NSP music video director Sean Barrett, with Svetlana Dekic as producer, and Gordon Yould as director of photography.

YouTube personality Jacksepticeye portrays "The Kid" central to the video, with Markiplier and SuperMega as the other members of the "Cool Patrol". It also features minor appearances by former Game Grumps editor Barry Kramer and Pamela Horton.

== Reception ==
The song reached #1 on the iTunes Comedy chart, and the music video reached a million views on YouTube in its first week.

== Personnel ==
Ninja Sex Party

- Dan Avidan – lead and backing vocals
- Brian Wecht – keyboards, piano, synthesizer

Production and additional musicians

- TWRP – backup band
  - Lord Phobos – guitar
  - Commander Meouch – bass guitar
  - Doctor Sung – keytar, synthesizer, keyboards
  - Havve Hogan – drums
- Jim Roach – production, engineer
- Jacksepticeye – spoken vocals
