= Dinosaur Laser Fight =

2011 song by Ninja Sex Party

Single by Ninja Sex Party

from the album NSFW
- Released: August 17, 2011
- Recorded: 2010–11
- Genre: Comedy rock; electronic rock; synth-pop
- Length: 1:59
- Label: Self-released
- Songwriter(s): Dan Avidan, Brian Wecht
- Producer(s): Dan Avidan, Brian Wecht

Ninja Sex Party singles chronology
"Dinosaur Laser Fight" (2011)	"FYI I Wanna F Your A" (2011)

"Dinosaur Laser Fight" is the debut single by American comedy rock duo Ninja Sex Party, released on August 17, 2011. The song is included as a track on the band's debut studio album NSFW.

== Music video ==
The music video for "Dinosaur Laser Fight" premiered on YouTube on August 17, 2011. The video was the ninth music video to be uploaded to the official Ninja Sex Party YouTube channel. The video, which depicts the fictitious characters of Danny Sexbang and Ninja Brian attempting to teach a science class, was directed by Eric Smith and Jim Turner. Arin Hanson, an animator also known as Egoraptor, provided the video's animated sequences. Avidan would later be integrated into Hanson's Let's Play webseries Game Grumps.

== Track listing ==
Digital download
No.	Title	Writer(s)	Producer(s)	Length
1.	"Dinosaur Laser Fight"	Dan Avidan, Brian Wecht	Avidan, Wecht	1:59

== Reception ==
The song has received positive reception. Sam Proof of CraveOnline wrote that it is a "hilarious song" and jokingly called it a "real history lesson". John Eckes of the website One of Us listed "Dinosaur Laser Fight" as the best Ninja Sex Party song, calling it "every boyhood fantasy I ever had mashed into one concentrated song of awesome".

== Personnel ==
Ninja Sex Party

- Dan Avidan – vocals
- Brian Wecht – keyboards, production

Additional personnel

- Arin Hanson – laser sounds, artwork

== Charts ==
Chart (2015)	Peak position
US Comedy Digital Tracks (Billboard)	55

== Release history ==
Country	Date	Format	Label
Australia	September 29, 2011	Digital download	Micro, Inc.
United Kingdom	September 29, 2011	Digital download	Micro, Inc.
United States	September 29, 2011	Digital download	Micro, Inc.

== Level Up version ==
"Dinosaur Laser Fight (Level Up)"

Single by Ninja Sex Party

from the album Level Up
- Released: October 16, 2021
- Recorded: 2021
- Genre: Comedy rock
- Length: 2:59
- Label: Self-released
- Songwriter(s): Dan Avidan, Brian Wecht
- Producer(s): Dan Avidan, Brian Wecht

Ninja Sex Party singles chronology
"6969 (Level Up)" (2021)	"Dinosaur Laser Fight (Level Up)" (2021)

A re-recorded version of "Dinosaur Laser Fight", from their 2021 album Level Up which contains new versions of previously released songs, was released as the album's second single.
