= Under the Covers =

Under the Covers may refer to:

== Music ==
- Under the Covers (Colton Ford album), 2009
- Under the Covers (Dwight Yoakam album), 1997
- Under the Covers (Ninja Sex Party album), 2016
- Under the Covers, Vol. II, a 2017 album by Ninja Sex Party
- Under the Covers, Vol. III, a 2019 album by Ninja Sex Party
- Under the Covers, Vol. 1, an album by Matthew Sweet and Susanna Hoffs covering songs from the 1960s
- Under the Covers, Vol. 2, an album by Matthew Sweet and Susanna Hoffs covering songs from the 1970s
- Under the Covers, Vol. 3, an album by Matthew Sweet and Susanna Hoffs covering songs from the 1980s
- Under the Covers: Essential Red Hot Chili Peppers, 1998
- Under The Covers, an album by Les Fradkin
- Under the Covers, an album by Maddy Prior
- Under the Covers, a cover album by Walk Off The Earth

== See also ==
- On Top of the Covers, a 2023 album by T-Pain
