= Danny Don't You Know =

Single by Ninja Sex Party

from the album Cool Patrol
- Released: June 25, 2018
- Studio: Various: Palmquist Studios; (Los Angeles, California); Santa Monica Recordings; (Santa Monica, California)
- Genre: Power ballad; comedy rock
- Length: 4:34
- Label: Self-released
- Songwriters: Dan Avidan; Brian Wecht; Jim Roach
- Producer: Jim Roach

Ninja Sex Party singles chronology
"Orgy for One" (2018)	"Danny Don't You Know" (2018)

"Danny Don't You Know" is a song by American musical comedy duo Ninja Sex Party. It was released as a single along with a music video on June 25, 2018, and was later featured on their sixth studio album Cool Patrol, released on August 17, 2018.

Written by band members Dan Avidan and Brian Wecht as well as producer Jim Roach, the song is a power ballad based on Avidan's life, and tells the story of a young, troubled Danny Sexbang being visited by his older self, who convinces him of his worth and tells him of all the good things awaiting him in the future. The music video, which became the #1 trending video on YouTube when released, features Finn Wolfhard as the young Danny. The band called "Danny Don't You Know" their "favorite-ever song", both musically and as a video.

== Music video ==
The music video was released on YouTube on June 25, 2018. Finn Wolfhard, a friend of Avidan since he had appeared on Avidan's web show Game Grumps in January 2017 and a fan of the band, was featured as a younger Danny Sexbang, with small appearances by Arin Hanson, Nathan Sharp, Markiplier, Pamela Horton, Tupper Ware Remix Party, Lasercorn, Mica Burton and former Game Grumps editor Kevin Abernathy.

The video was produced by Shawn Wallace, with Bret Rea serving as on-set producer, Gordon Yould as cinematographer, Traci Hays as production designer, and Nicole Case as art director.

== Reception ==
After its release, the music video became the #1 trending video on YouTube, and peaked at #24 on Billboard's Rock Digital Song Sales.

Classic Rock praised the song and video, calling it a "power ballad life lesson triumph" and stating "Ninja Sex Party instruct all the nerds of the world to rock on... and it's the message we all need in 2018".

The A.V. Club stated about the song "Is it gimmicky? Certainly—as much as Ninja Sex Party’s knowingly jokey music, whose glammed-up-but-smoothed-out bombast comes off like The Darkness if it were aping Starship instead of Queen. But it’s a self-aware sort of gimmickry, one that takes digs at the band members’ own distant and current lack of cool ('No one cares that you’re 35!' Sexbang sings at one point), and maybe that shamelessness is enough to ameliorate its naked desperation."

Pop Buzz stated about the video "The visual of Finn being encouraged by the older version of himself is actually pretty sweet once you get past all the spandex. Finn's character goes from being bullied in a classroom to rocking out on stage with his older self and it's all very inspiring, if we're being honest."

On September 17, 2018, "Danny Don't You Know" was performed live on Conan, with longtime touring band Tupper Ware Remix Party (TWRP) marking it as both bands' first live television debut.

== Personnel ==
Ninja Sex Party

- Dan Avidan – lead and backing vocals
- Brian Wecht – keyboards, piano, synthesizer

Production

- Jim Roach – production, engineer
- Eric Palmquist – additional engineering
- Thom Flowers – mixing
- Randy Merrill – mastering

Additional musicians

- TWRP – backup band
  - Lord Phobos – guitar
  - Commander Meouch – bass guitar
  - Doctor Sung – keytar, synthesizer, keyboards
  - Havve Hogan – drums
- Jim Roach – guitars

== Charts ==
Chart (2018)	Peak position
Rock Digital Song Sales (Billboard)	24
