= Unicorn Wizard =

Single by Ninja Sex Party

from the album Strawberries and Cream
- Released: October 25, 2012
- Recorded: 2011–12
- Genre: Comedy rock, synth-pop
- Length: 3:06
- Label: Self-released
- Songwriters: Dan Avidan, Brian Wecht
- Producers: Dan Avidan, Brian Wecht

Ninja Sex Party singles chronology
"Next to You" (2012)	"Unicorn Wizard" (2012)	"Dick Figures: The Movie: The Song" (2013)

"Unicorn Wizard" is a song written and performed by American comedy rock band Ninja Sex Party. The song was released as the band's fourth single on October 25, 2012, and was included as a track on the band's second studio album Strawberries and Cream.

== Music video ==
A music video for the song was uploaded to YouTube on October 25, 2012. The video, which was directed by Jim Turner and Annie Quick, features animated sequences produced by Newgrounds animators Zach Hadel and Chris O'Neill.

The video is the eighth most viewed upload on the channel, with 6.3 million views as of June 2019.

== Track listings ==
Digital download
No.	Title	Writer(s)	Producer(s)	Length
1.	"Unicorn Wizard"	Dan Avidan, Brian Wecht	Avidan, Wecht	3:06

== Reception ==
The song has received positive reviews. John Eckes of the website One of Us listed "Unicorn Wizard" as the second best Ninja Sex Party song, writing that "the whole song is dramatic and yet hilarious. They really pushed their imaginations on this one and I think it shows in every second of this".

== Personnel ==
Ninja Sex Party

- Dan Avidan – vocals
- Brian Wecht – keyboards, production
- Rachel Bitney Wecht – guest vocals

== Charts ==
Chart (2013)	Peak position
US Comedy Digital Tracks (Billboard)	55

== Release history ==
Country	Date	Format	Label
Australia	April 15, 2013	Digital download	Micro, Inc.
United Kingdom	April 15, 2013	Digital download	Micro, Inc.
United States	April 15, 2013	Digital download	Micro, Inc.
