= 6969 =

Song by Ninja Sex Party

- YouTube thumbnail of the song's music video

Single by Ninja Sex Party

from the album Attitude City
- Released: 17 July 2015
- Recorded: Arcadia, California
- Genre: Synthpop; comedy rock; progressive pop
- Length: 8:29
- Label: Self-released
- Songwriters: Dan Avidan; Brian Wecht
- Producer: Brian Wecht

"6969" is a song written and performed by the American comedy rock band Ninja Sex Party, from their album Attitude City. Heavily inspired by the song "2112" by Canadian rock band Rush, the song contains vocals by Steel Panther singer Michael Starr, and references Steel Panther's song "In the Future" from their album Balls Out.

Written by band members Dan Avidan and Brian Wecht, "6969" tells the story of Danny Sexbang and Ninja Brian travelling to the year 6969 assuming that it will be the ultimate peak in sexual activity throughout human history, only to find out that a totalitarian group known as the "Council of Dick Elders" has made sexual intercourse illegal. At over eight minutes, it was the longest track officially released by Ninja Sex Party until "The Mystic Crystal" in 2019.

== Lyrics and interpretation ==
The song's lyrics follow the fictitious characters of Danny Sexbang and Ninja Brian, who use a time-travelling spacecraft to journey to the planet Earth in the year 6969. Believing that the year would be the ultimate peak in sexual activity throughout human history, they instead find that society is a metaphorically sterilized dystopia ruled by an abstinent, totalitarian group known as the "Dick Elders". When Danny attempts to reason with them, they recall a prophecy that foretells their downfall, and so their guards fire at the duo with lasers. Danny and Brian escape and, after Danny meets a beautiful girl, they ignite a worldwide orgy that enrages the Elders. As the Elders prepare to murder the duo, Brian kills them. Having freed humanity from the Elders' regime, Danny has intercourse once again with the girl he met, whose name is revealed to be Kristen (though Danny mistakes it as "Katie"), and he and Brian depart from the future.

The song directly borrows a lyric from the Rush song "2112", as Sexbang sings the phrase "I know it's most unusual to come before you so".

== Music video ==
The music video for "6969" was released on iTunes and Apple Music on August 31, 2016, and premiered on YouTube on September 8, 2016.

The video follows the same plot as the song's lyrics, with appearances by Arin Hanson, Barry Kramer, Kevin Abernathy, Holly Conrad, and Ross O'Donovan. Markiplier and Suzy Berhow also make silent cameos in the video as a news reporter and a celebrating person respectively.

== Reception ==
The song has received generally positive reception from both fans of the band and from critics. Richard Garza of the Western Herald wrote that the track is "[Ninja Sex Party's] magnum opus. It is definitely the best song on a great album."

== Personnel ==
Ninja Sex Party

- Dan Avidan – vocals
- Brian Wecht – keyboards, production

Guests

- Michael Starr – guest vocals
- Arin Hanson – narrator

Production

- David Dominguez – co-producer, recording
- Dan Castellani, Jr. – mixing
- Hans DeKline – mastering

== Level Up version ==
"6969"

Single by Ninja Sex Party

from the album Level Up
- Released: October 8, 2021
- Recorded: 2021
- Genre: Synthpop; comedy rock; progressive pop
- Length: 8:29
- Label: Self-released
- Songwriters: Dan Avidan; Brian Wecht
- Producer: Brian Wecht

Ninja Sex Party singles chronology
"Welcome to My Parents' House" (2020)	"6969" (2021)	"Dinosaur Laser Fight" (2021)

A re-recorded version of "6969", from their 2021 album Level Up which contains new versions of previously released songs, was released as the album's first single.

== Release history ==
Country	Date	Format	Label
Australia	July 17, 2015	Digital download	Self-released
United Kingdom	July 17, 2015	Digital download	Self-released
United States	July 17, 2015	Digital download	Self-released
