= The Young Romans =

2010s American pop/indie duo

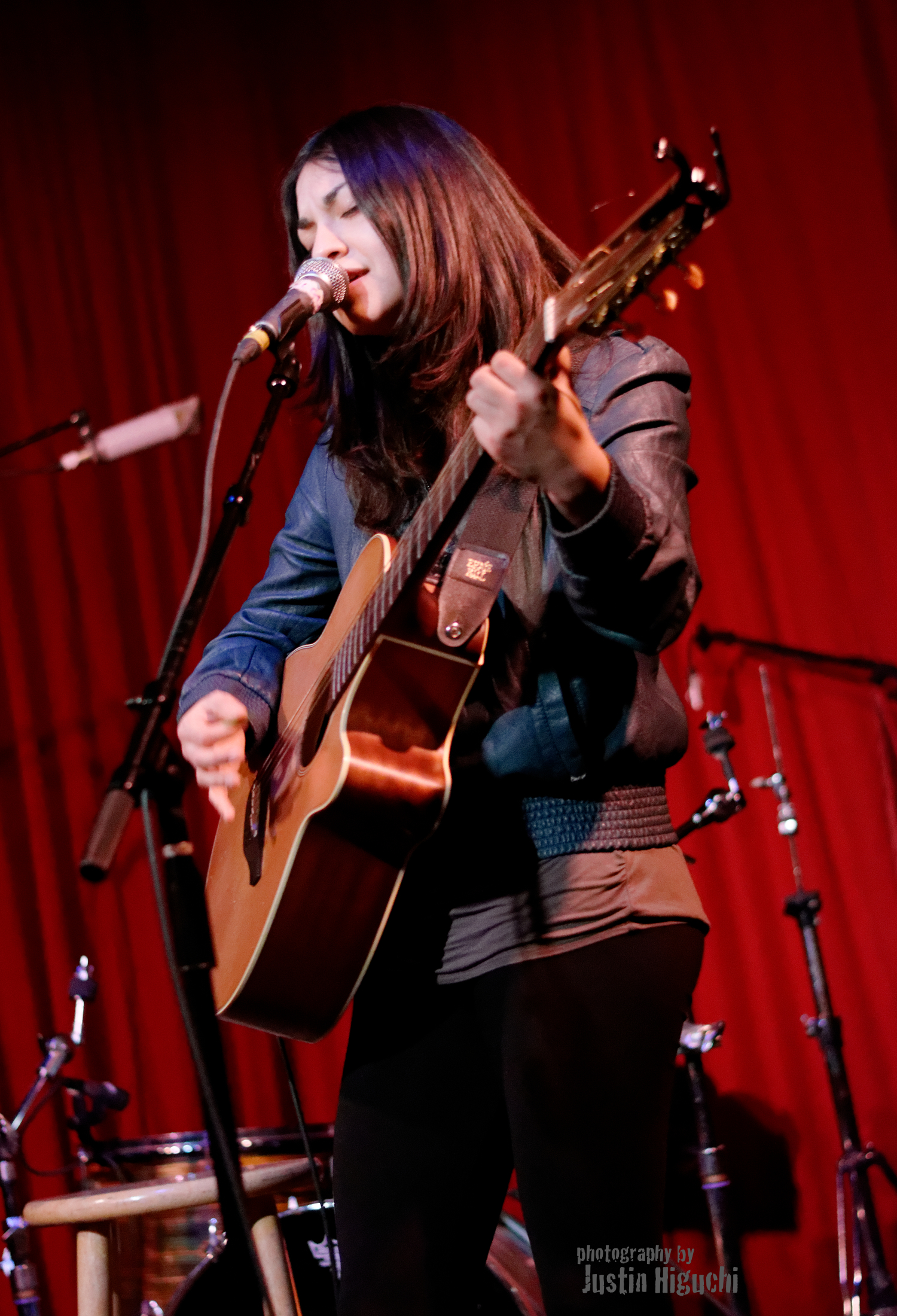

Background information
- Origin: Los Angeles, California, United States
- Genre: Indie pop
- Years active: 2010–2015
- Label: Red Parade Music Group
- Website: https://www.theyoungromans.com

The Young Romans were a pop/indie duo from Los Angeles, California active between 2010 and 2015. They consisted of singer/pianist Brad Hooks and Chilean-born singer/guitarist, Sari Mellafe.

In 2010, the group were signed to producer Jim Roach's label Red Parade Music and released their first EP, Yesterday Night. This was followed by their first album Tiger Child in 2012. A subsequent EP, Bells and Sirens, Pt. 1, was released in 2015.

"Where You Go" was featured as the end credits song in the 2011 film Salmon Fishing in the Yemen, and "Circles" was also featured in an episode of the third season of The Fosters in 2015.

== Discography ==
- Yesterday Night (2010) - EP
- Tiger Child (2012) - LP
- Bells and Sirens, Pt. I (2015) - EP
