= Cool Patrol =

Studio album by Ninja Sex Party
- Released: August 17, 2018
- Studios: Various: Palmquist Studios; (Los Angeles, California); Santa Monica Recordings; (Santa Monica, California); Buffalo Recording; (Los Angeles, California)
- Genre: Comedy rock
- Length: 37:28
- Label: Self-released
- Producers: Jim Roach, Jim Arsenault, Dave Dominguez

Ninja Sex Party chronology
| Under the Covers, Vol. II (2017) | Cool Patrol (2018) | Under the Covers, Vol. III (2019) |

Singles from Cool Patrol
- 1. "Cool Patrol" Released: October 18, 2016; 2. "Eating Food in the Shower" Released: February 16, 2017; 3. "Orgy for One" Released: March 6, 2018; 4. "Danny Don't You Know" Released: June 25, 2018; 5. "Heart Boner" Released: August 2, 2018

Cool Patrol is the sixth studio album by American musical comedy duo Ninja Sex Party, released on August 17, 2018. Following two cover albums, it marks their return to original and comedy-oriented material since Attitude City in 2015.

It is also their first release with new producer and co-songwriter Jim Roach, and their first original album to feature TWRP as backup band. Five tracks were released as singles between 2016 and 2018. Upon release, the album reached No. 1 on Billboard's Top Comedy Albums and Independent Albums charts, topping the first for seven consecutive weeks; it was ultimately the #1 comedy album of the year on their Year-end charts.

== Recording and production ==
=== Songwriting ===
Cool Patrol marked the first time that original Ninja Sex Party songs were not written solely by Avidan and Wecht, as their new producer Jim Roach co-wrote six of the fifteen tracks of the album; "Orgy for One" was released as a single on March 6, 2018, making it the first released song of the band not solely written by the duo. All the songs were written by Avidan and Wecht, with some co-written by Roach. Avidan stated that Roach "really shares our sensibilities, and kind of helps us with ideas, and he has kind of opened up our music world."

"Danny Don't You Know" is a power ballad; With Guitar also noted the presence of other genres through the album, such as new wave ("Cool Patrol"), synth-pop ("Orgy for One"), heavy metal ("Release the Kraken"), and madrigal ("Courtship of the Mermaid").

The idea for "Danny Don't You Know" came from January 2017, when actor Finn Wolfhard appeared as a guest in two episodes of Avidan's show Guest Grumps. According to Avidan, Wolfhard had been a fan of Ninja Sex Party since the age of nine, when his older brother Nick introduced him to either Ninja Sex Party or Game Grumps (of which Guest Grumps is a spin-off), stating "as young as he is, he's like, six or seven years deep being a fan with us. So he came to the office and he's just such a great kid, and we ended up taking pictures with him, but I happened to be wearing the same shirt as him, and it looks shockingly like an evolutionary timeline. [...] And so we just decided to sort of write a song around that, 'cause we asked him if he'd be cool with playing the young version of me in a video." Wecht added:"It's the only time we've ever written a song based on like, a photo basically." Writing the song was emotional for Avidan, "because it's sort of [me and Wecht's] life story. It's about me specifically, but we both had the same kind of nerdy upbringing."

Wecht further recalled: "Everyone was like, 'Finn, you look like you're young Dan.' Then we basically all had the same idea at the same time, which was, 'Why don't we write a song in which he is young Dan?'" Shortly after its release as a single on June 25, 2018, The band called "Danny Don't You Know" their "favorite-ever song", both musically and as a video, with Avidan stating on a latter interview that "everything seemed to come together right on that one".

Avidan and Wecht stated that "Release the Kraken" was their other favourite song on the album, with Avidan stating "We're big fans of like, progressive rock from the 70s and 80s rock too, and that [song] kind of has both in a weird way".

The ninth track, "Heart Boner (Part II of the Boner Trilogy)", is a follow-up to the song "No Reason Boner" released in February 2010 and later included in Ninja Sex Party's 2011 debut album NSFW. Wecht stated "The character of Danny Sexbang is this like emotionally stunted man-child. The most romantic thing he could possibly think of would be a heart boner", while Avidan added "The character is very genuine and very heartfelt, and he's not putting on an act, but a heart boner would be his image of the truest expression of love." According to Avidan, the song's subtitle was a nod to the tendency of progressive rock bands to make "big trilogies and series of songs over the course of 10 different albums." The song was written by Avidan, Wecht and Roach, with Dallas Kruse acting as arranger of the string section. Wecht called "GFY" "kind of like a marching band thing, very 'in your face.'"

=== Crew and production ===
In addition to Roach as producer and engineer, the production crew included Eric Palmquist as additional engineer, Thom Flowers as mixing engineer, and Randy Merrill as mastering engineer. "Cool Patrol" and "Courtship of the Mermaid" were produced by Jim Arsenault, who had produced the band's two previous Under the Covers albums, and Dave Dominguez; they were mixed by Steel Panther producer Jay Ruston, who was assisted by Jack Douglass. Shortly after the release, Avidan stated "It's the proudest I've ever been of anything we've done. It sounds like a real band. It doesn't seem like too much to ask, but it's a big deal to us."

Canadian band TWRP performed as the backup band on the album, as they did on the previous two albums; it was the first original Ninja Sex Party album to feature them. Other guests include Panic! at the Disco session member Kenneth "Kenny" Harris performing a guitar solo on "Orgy for One", and Bob Reynolds and Rashawn Ross performing saxophone and trumpet respectively on "Smooth Talkin'".

=== Recording and post-production ===
The album was recorded in three different studios: Palmquist Studios in Los Angeles, Santa Monica Recordings in Santa Monica, and Buffalo Recording in Los Angeles (the latter for the songs produced by Arsenault and Dominguez).

In November 2017, Avidan mentioned in an episode of Game Grumps that the band had finished most of the recording of Cool Patrol, and were aiming for a June 2018 release.

On March 6, 2018, the band confirmed that the audio production of the album was completed, and that they were aiming at a "probable July release" which would be preceded with two new original song releases in the meantime. As of May 8, 2018, all audio work on the album was finished, and the album design was being completed. During the post-production of Cool Patrol, the band recorded their next cover album, Under the Covers, Vol. III; in parallel, they also recorded The TryForce, the third album of Starbomb, a band both Avidan and Wecht are also members of; both Under the Covers, Vol. III and The TryForce are produced by Roach.

== Promotion ==
The tracklist was officially announced on August 1, 2018, although it had already been leaked on Classic Rock on June 26. The album became available for pre-orders on the same day, in two editions: standard, including a poster of the band, and Deluxe, signed by Avidan and Wecht.

=== Singles and music videos ===
The first single from the album, "Cool Patrol", was released as a single and music video on October 18, 2016, reached No. 1 on the iTunes Comedy chart. The video features YouTuber Jacksepticeye. "Eating Food in the Shower" was released as a single and music video on February 16, 2017. On March 6, 2018, the band released "Orgy for One" as a single and music video. The song would be re-recorded for the album release.

On June 25, 2018, the band released the music video for "Danny Don't You Know", along with the official release date of Cool Patrol, August 17. As planned when writing the song, Wolfhard appeared in the video as a younger Danny Sexbang. "Danny Don't You Know" became the No. 1 trending video on YouTube when released. On September 17, the band performed the song as a musical guest on Conan along with TWRP.

"Heart Boner" was released as a single on August 2, 2018, along with a music video mixing live action and animation.

"First Date" was released as an animated music video on August 10, 2018, animated by Simon Macko. "Release the Kraken" was also released as an animated music video on November 29, 2018, animated by KLN.

The music video for "Courtship of the Mermaid" was released on June 24, 2019, featuring cameos from Adam Kovic and Lawrence Sonntag of Funhaus. An animated video for "Mansion Party" was released on September 6, 2019, also animated by Simon Macko.

== Critical reception ==
With Guitar stated "Ninja Sex Party have a sound as epic as Danny Sexbang's fur-lined cape and more intense than Ninja Brian's ninja pants. From the raging metal guitars of 'Release the Kraken' and synth jam 'Orgy for One' to the bouncy new wave of the dance-along title track to the delicate madrigals and bone-fracturing sound effects of 'Courtship of the Mermaid', it's the most polished and sonically diverse Ninja Sex Party album to date."

"Danny Don't You Know" became the No. 1 trending video on YouTube when released as a single, and received notable praise from several media outlets. Classic Rock called the song it a "power ballad life lesson triumph", while Pop Buzz considered it "very inspiring". Louder called the song "brilliant", stating, "This is the sort of life-affirmation we all need every once in a while." The popularity of the song led to Ninja Sex Party performing the song with TWRP on the late-night talk show Conan on September 17, 2018, in their live television debut; this censored version, which replaced the word "fuck" with "heck" and "hell", was released as a studio recording on September 21, under the name "Danny Don't You Know (Cool as Heck Version)". Avidan stated that the reaction to "Danny Don't You Know" made him and Wecht very emotional: "People started having a much different reaction to it than they had with any of our previous songs by far. [...] Even people in our personal lives were reaching out to us and saying like 'This means a lot to me', and that had never happened before."

== Commercial performance ==
Cool Patrol debuted at No. 1 on Billboard's Top Comedy Albums and Independent Albums charts, topping the first for seven consecutive weeks.

It also peaked at No. 2 on the Top Rock Albums chart, and at No. 21 on the Billboard 200. It was ultimately the #1 comedy album of the year on Billboard's Year-end charts.

== Track listing ==
All tracks written by Dan Avidan and Brian Wecht, except where noted.

| No. | Title | Writer(s) | Length |
|---|---|---|---|
| 1. | "Intro (Cool)" | | 1:03 |
| 2. | "Cool Patrol" | | 3:17 |
| 3. | "Orgy for One" | Avidan, Wecht, Jim Roach | 3:23 |
| 4. | "Danny Don't You Know" | Avidan, Wecht, Roach | 4:35 |
| 5. | "Release the Kraken" | Avidan, Wecht, Roach | 3:20 |
| 6. | "Ninja Brian Goes to Soccer Practice" | | 0:31 |
| 7. | "First Date" | Avidan, Wecht, Roach | 2:45 |
| 8. | "Smooth Talkin'" | | 2:39 |
| 9. | "Heart Boner (Part II of the Boner Trilogy)" | Avidan, Wecht, Roach; string arrangement by Dallas Kruse | 4:13 |
| 10. | "Romance Novel" | | 1:56 |
| 11. | "Eating Food in the Shower" | | 2:09 |
| 12. | "Courtship of the Mermaid" | | 2:49 |
| 13. | "GFY" | | 1:07 |
| 14. | "Mansion Party" | Avidan, Wecht, Roach | 2:45 |
| 15. | "Outro (Patrol)" | | 0:56 |
| Total length: | | | 37:28 |

== Personnel ==
Credits adapted from the album's liner notes.

Ninja Sex Party

- Dan Avidan – lead and backing vocals
- Brian Wecht – keyboards and synthesizers, backing vocals on "GFY", uncredited spoken vocals on "Release the Kraken" and "Ninja Brian Goes to Soccer Practice"

Production

- Jim Roach – production and engineering (tracks 1, 3–11, 13–15)
- Jim Arsenault, Dave Dominguez – production and engineering on "Cool Patrol" and "Courtship of the Mermaid"
- Eric Palmquist – additional engineering (tracks 3–5, 7–9, 11, 14)
- Thom Flowers – mixing (tracks 1, 3–11, 13–15)
- Jay Ruston – mixing on "Cool Patrol" and "Courtship of the Mermaid"
- Jack Douglass – mixing assistant on "Cool Patrol" and "Courtship of the Mermaid"
- Randy Merrill – mastering
- Fernando Ecovar – photos
- Lazerhorse – album design

Additional musicians

- TWRP – backup band (tracks 2–5, 7–9, 11–12, 14)
  - Lord Phobos – guitar
  - Commander Meouch – bass guitar
  - Doctor Sung – synthesizers, keyboards
  - Havve Hogan – drums
- Jim Roach – guitars (tracks 3–5, 7–9, 14), drums and backing vocals on "GFY"
- Kenny Harris – guitar solo on "Orgy for One"
- Bob Reynolds – tenor saxophone on "Smooth Talkin'"
- Garrett Smith – trombone on "Smooth Talkin'"
- Rashawn Ross – trumpet on "Smooth Talkin'"
- Stephanie Aston, Kate Bass, Sarah Reynolds, Chloe Agnew, Jonathan Gordon, Nick Wuthrich, Jay Stephenson, Billy Malone – choir on "Courtship of the Mermaid"
- Zack Ramacier – trumpet on "GFY"
- Evan Waltmire – saxophone on "GFY"
- Andrew Alvarado – trombone on "GFY"
- Juliane Gralle – tuba on "GFY"
- Jacksepticeye – spoken vocals on "Cool Patrol" (uncredited)
- Arin Hanson – spoken vocals on "Release the Kraken", "Ninja Brian Goes to Soccer Practice" and "Eating Food in the Shower" (uncredited)

== Charts ==
| Chart (2018) | Peak position |
|---|---|
| US Billboard 200 | 21 |
| US Independent Albums (Billboard) | 1 |
| US Top Comedy Albums (Billboard) | 1 |
| US Top Rock Albums (Billboard) | 2 |
