= Under the Covers, Vol. III =

Studio album by Ninja Sex Party
- Released: November 15, 2019
- Studios: Various: Sonic Ranch Studios; (Texas); Santa Monica Recordings; (Santa Monica, California)
- Genres: Glam rock; funk; synth-pop; new wave; pop; progressive rock
- Length: 50:57
- Label: Self-released
- Producer: Jim Roach

Ninja Sex Party chronology
| Cool Patrol (2018) | Under the Covers, Vol. III (2019) | The Prophecy (2020) |

Singles from Under the Covers, Vol. III
- 1. "We Built This City" Released: November 1, 2019; 2. "Down Under" Released: November 8, 2019

Under the Covers, Vol. III is the seventh studio album by the American musical comedy duo Ninja Sex Party, originally released on November 15, 2019. It is the third cover album released by the duo, following Under the Covers (2016) and Under the Covers, Vol. II (2017). Like its predecessors, it features renditions of pop and rock songs from the 1970s and 1980s.

While the album was teased for a late 2019 release, the official release date of the album was announced at the band's 10th anniversary show in Chicago on October 12, 2019.

As with the band's previous three albums, Under the Covers, Vol. III features contributions from TWRP as a backup band on all songs except "Safety Dance".

== Track listing ==
| No. | Title | Writer(s) | Original artist | Length |
|---|---|---|---|---|
| 1. | "We Built This City" | Bernie Taupin, Martin Page, Dennis Lambert, Peter Wolf | Starship | 4:39 |
| 2. | "Photograph" | Steve Clark, Pete Willis, Rick Savage, Robert John "Mutt" Lange, Joe Elliott | Def Leppard | 4:15 |
| 3. | "Down Under" | Colin Hay, Ron Strykert | Men at Work | 3:11 |
| 4. | "Sledgehammer" | Peter Gabriel | Peter Gabriel | 4:33 |
| 5. | "Glory of Love" | Peter Cetera, David Foster, Diane Nini | Peter Cetera | 4:35 |
| 6. | "Always Something There to Remind Me" | Burt Bacharach, Hal David | Lou Johnson | 3:09 |
| 7. | "Closer to the Heart" | Neil Peart, Peter Talbot | Rush | 2:41 |
| 8. | "Nights on Broadway" | Barry Gibb, Robin Gibb, Maurice Gibb | Bee Gees | 4:39 |
| 9. | "Owner of a Lonely Heart" | Trevor Rabin, Jon Anderson, Chris Squire, Trevor Horn | Yes | 3:59 |
| 10. | "When You Were Mine" | Prince | Prince | 3:28 |
| 11. | "Safety Dance" | Ivan Doroschuk | Men Without Hats | 2:42 |
| 12. | "I Won't Back Down" | Tom Petty, Jeff Lynne | Tom Petty | 3:03 |
| 13. | "Don't Fear the Reaper" | Donald Roeser | Blue Öyster Cult | 6:03 |

== Personnel ==
Credits adapted from the album's liner notes.

Ninja Sex Party

- Dan Avidan – vocals, songwriting
- Brian Wecht – keyboards, production

Production

- Jim Roach – production and engineering
- Mario Ramirez – engineering
- Thom Flowers – mixing
- Randy Merrill – mastering
- Tucker Prescott – photos
- Lazerhorse – album design

Additional musicians

- Tupper Ware Remix Party – backup band (all tracks except "Safety Dance")
  - Lord Phobos – guitar
  - Commander Meouch – bass
  - Doctor Sung – talkbox, synthesizer
  - Havve Hogan – drums
- Super Guitar Bros – acoustic guitars on "Don't Fear the Reaper"
- Jeff Driskill – saxophone on "Sledgehammer"
- Rashawn Ross – trumpet on "Sledgehammer"
- Garrett Smith – trombone on "Sledgehammer"
- Dallas Kruse – string arrangements on "Don't Fear the Reaper" and "Glory of Love"
- The Era Queens – backing vocals on "Sledgehammer"
- Jim Roach – additional guitars and synths

== Charts ==
| Chart (2019) | Peak position |
|---|---|
| Australian Digital Albums (ARIA) | 12 |
| US Billboard 200 | 42 |
