= Under the Covers, Vol. II =

Studio album by Ninja Sex Party
- Released: October 27, 2017
- Genre: Rock; synth-pop; progressive rock; glam rock
- Length: 51:03
- Label: Self-released
- Producer: Jim Arsenault

Ninja Sex Party chronology
| Under the Covers (2016) | Under the Covers, Vol. II (2017) | Cool Patrol (2018) |

Singles from Under the Covers, Vol. II
- 1. "Pour Some Sugar on Me" Released: October 12, 2017; 2. "Rocket Man" Released: October 19, 2017

Under the Covers, Vol. II is the fifth studio album by American comedy duo Ninja Sex Party. It is their second cover album and a follow-up to their previous album Under the Covers. It follows the same musical orientation, consisting of covers of songs from the 1970s and 1980s and straying from the duo's usual comedic style. The album was released on October 27, 2017, to positive reviews.

It is their second album to feature Tupper Ware Remix Party as backup band; guitarist Satchel from Steel Panther is also featured as a guest on "Limelight", as well as the Super Guitar Bros on the final track, "Rocket Man". Four official music videos based on tracks from the album have been released, including "Pour Some Sugar on Me" released on October 12, "Rocket Man" released on October 19, "Heat of the Moment" released on October 26, and "Africa" released on November 1 the next year. On May 2, 2019, a music video for "In Your Eyes" was released, featuring animation by artist Imogen Scoppie. A third cover album, Under the Covers, Vol. III, was announced on October 4, 2019, on Ninja Sex Party's official Twitter page, with its official cover artwork was revealed on October 13. It later released on November 15.

== Production ==
On June 28, 2017, the band announced on their Facebook page that they had completed all the songs for the album, with a planned September/early October 2017 release date. The following day, they announced the tracklist.

Tupper Ware Remix Party, which have served as Ninja Sex Party's backup band since 2015, confirmed their involvement on July 2, stating that they helped "record and produce" ten of the twelve featured songs.

== Track listing ==
| No. | Title | Writer(s) | Original artist | Length |
|---|---|---|---|---|
| 1. | "Africa" | David Paich, Jeff Porcaro | Toto | 4:43 |
| 2. | "More Than a Feeling" | Tom Scholz | Boston | 4:29 |
| 3. | "Limelight" | Lyrics: Neil Peart / Music: Alex Lifeson, Geddy Lee | Rush | 4:24 |
| 4. | "Pour Some Sugar on Me" | Joe Elliott, Rick Savage, Phil Collen, Steve Clark, Mutt Lange | Def Leppard | 3:45 |
| 5. | "Something About You" | Wally Badarou, Phil Gould, Mark King, Mike Lindup | Level 42 | 4:24 |
| 6. | "In Your Eyes" | Peter Gabriel | Peter Gabriel | 5:23 |
| 7. | "Heat of the Moment" | John Wetton, Geoff Downes | Asia | 3:25 |
| 8. | "You Spin Me Round (Like a Record)" | Pete Burns, Steve Coy, Wayne Hussey, Tim Lever, Mike Percy | Dead or Alive | 4:07 |
| 9. | "Don't Lose My Number" | Phil Collins | Phil Collins | 4:44 |
| 10. | "I Wish" | Stevie Wonder | Stevie Wonder | 3:27 |
| 11. | "Your Wildest Dreams" | Justin Hayward | The Moody Blues | 3:55 |
| 12. | "Rocket Man" | Lyrics: Bernie Taupin / Music: Elton John | Elton John | 4:10 |

== Personnel ==
Ninja Sex Party

- Dan Avidan – lead and backing vocals
- Brian Wecht – keyboards, piano, synthesizer and programming

Additional personnel

- Tupper Ware Remix Party – backup band
  - Lord Phobos – guitar
  - Commander Meouch – bass guitar
  - Doctor Sung – keytar
  - Havve Hogan – drums
- Jim Arsenault – production
- Super Guitar Bros – acoustic guitar ("Rocket Man")
- Satchel – guitar ("Limelight")

== Charts ==
| Chart (2017) | Peak position |
|---|---|
| Canadian Albums (Billboard) | 89 |
| US Billboard 200 | 19 |
| US Independent Albums (Billboard) | 1 |
| US Top Rock Albums (Billboard) | 2 |
| US Top Album Sales (Billboard) | 4 |
| US Digital Albums (Billboard) | 15 |
