= Strawberries and Cream (album) =

Studio album by Ninja Sex Party
- Released: April 15, 2013
- Recorded: Brooklyn, New York and Arcadia, California
- Genres: Comedy rock; synth-pop
- Length: 24:59
- Label: Self-released
- Producer: Brian Wecht

Ninja Sex Party chronology
NSFW (2011)	Strawberries and Cream (2013)	Attitude City (2015)

Singles from Strawberries and Cream
- 1. "FYI I Wanna F Your A" Released: December 1, 2011; 2. "Next to You" Released: April 25, 2012; 3. "Unicorn Wizard" Released: September 24, 2012

Strawberries and Cream is the second studio album by the American musical comedy duo Ninja Sex Party. The album was released on April 15, 2013. Three tracks from the album, "FYI I Wanna F Your A", "Next to You", and "Unicorn Wizard", were released as singles prior to the album's release. The album was a modest success worldwide.

== Track listing ==
All tracks are written by Dan Avidan and Brian Wecht.

No.	Title	Length
1.	"Intro (Strawberries)"	0:40
2.	"Best Friends Forever!"	2:27
3.	"Unicorn Wizard"	3:04
4.	"Let's Get This Terrible Party Started"	2:06
5.	"Next to You"	2:30
6.	"Symphony in P Minor"	0:14
7.	"The Sacred Chalice, Pt. 1"	2:26
8.	"Everybody Shut Up (I Have an Erection)"	2:30
9.	"FYI I Wanna F Your A"	2:03
10.	"Shredded Metal"	1:07
11.	"Rhinoceratops vs. Superpuma"	2:36
12.	"The Ultimate Sandwich"	2:21
13.	"Outro (Cream)"	0:55

== Personnel ==
=== Ninja Sex Party ===
- Dan Avidan – vocals
- Brian Wecht – music, production, background vocals (tracks 7, 8 and 9)

=== Crew ===
- David Dominguez – co-producer, recording
- Dan Castellani, Jr. – mixing
- Hans DeKline – mastering

== Charts ==
=== Weekly charts ===
Chart (2015)	Peak position
US Billboard 200	55
US Top Comedy Albums (Billboard)	1
US Independent Albums (Billboard)	5
US Top Album Sales (Billboard)	21

=== Year-end charts ===
Chart (2015)	Position
US Top Comedy Albums (Billboard)	7
