= Dan Avidan =

American musician and YouTuber (born 1979)

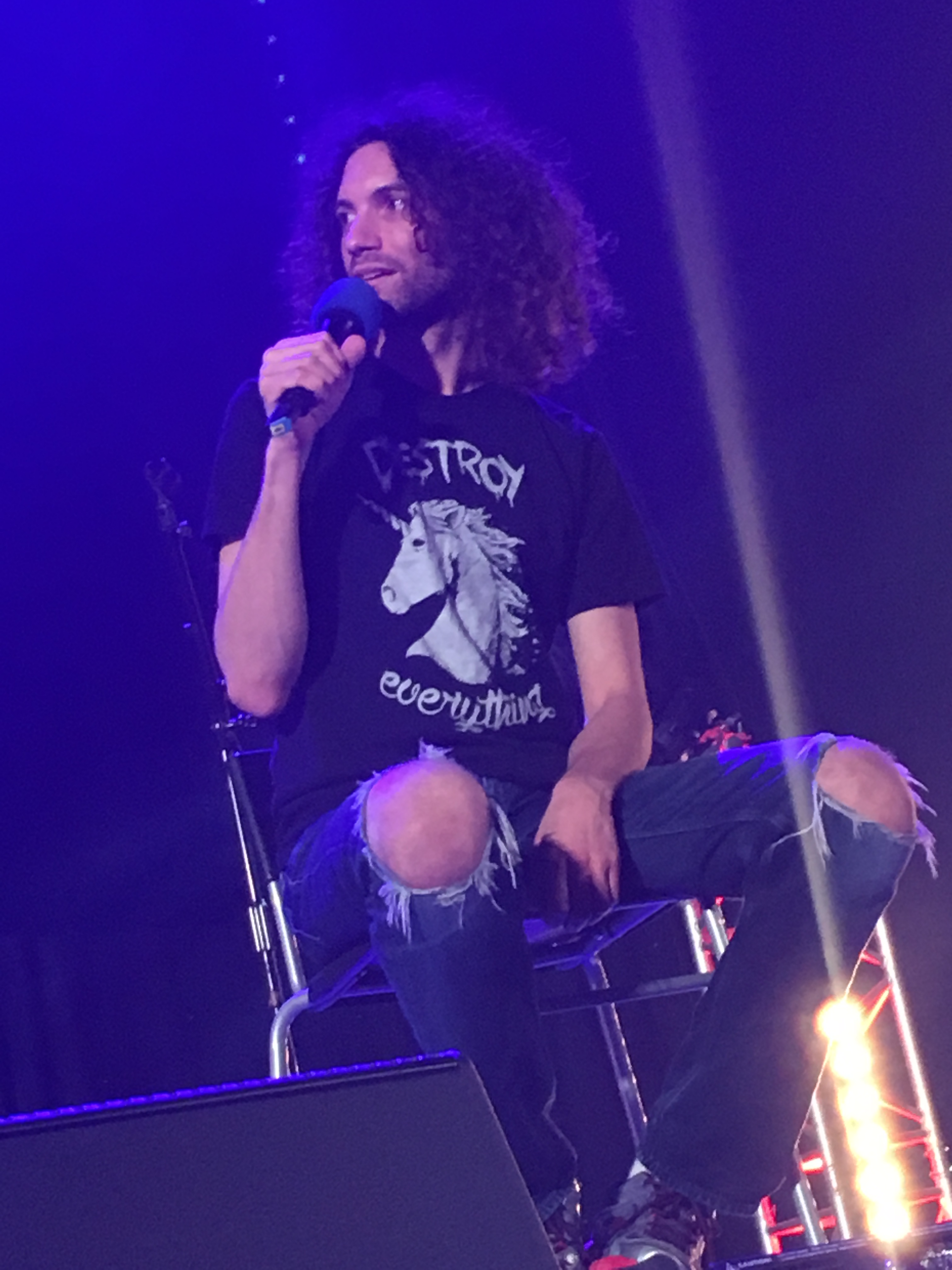
- Avidan at the Hammersmith Apollo in 2017
- Born: Leigh Daniel Avidan; March 14, 1979 (age 47); Springfield, New Jersey, U.S.
- Other name: Danny Sexbang
- Education: Boston University
- Occupations: Internet personality; musician; singer; rapper; songwriter; actor; comedian
- Spouse: Ashley Anderson

YouTube information
- Channel: Ninja Sex Party
- Years active: 2009–present
- Genres: Comedy; music; gaming
- Subscribers: 1.38 million
- Views: 360 million
- Musical career
- Origin: Philadelphia, Pennsylvania, U.S.
- Genres: Dan Avidan; Rock; electronic; alternative rock Danny Sexbang; Comedy rock; satire
- Instrument: Vocals
- Years active: 2002–present
- Member of: Skyhill, Ninja Sex Party, Starbomb, Shadow Academy
- Formerly of: The Northern Hues
- Last updated: July 10, 2026
- Website: ninjasexparty.com www.skyhillmusic.com www.shadowacademymusic.com

Leigh Daniel Avidan (born March 14, 1979), also known by his stage name Danny Sexbang, is an American musician, internet personality, actor, and comedian. He is one half of the musical comedy duo Ninja Sex Party with Brian Wecht, as well as the co-host of the Let's Play webseries Game Grumps with Arin Hanson. He is also part of the more rap-based comedy music trio Starbomb with Hanson and Wecht, and the vocalist for the rock duo Shadow Academy, known for its inspiration from classic novels, alongside Jim Roach. As of October 2023, Avidan also performs vocals for the electronic music duo Skyhill, originally co-founded by Avidan in 2007.

== Early life and education ==
Avidan was born and raised in Springfield, New Jersey, as the elder child of Debra (née Schwartz) and Avigdor "Avi" Avidan (Hebrew: אביגדור אבידן). His father was born and raised in Israel, and served in the Six Day War and Yom Kippur War before immigrating to America where he met Avidan's mother. His younger sister, Dana Avidan Cohn, is the executive style director of PopSugar. His maternal grandfather Bernard Schwartz assisted in inventing the body electrode.

After graduating from Jonathan Dayton High School in 1997, Avidan began pursuing advertising at Boston University in Boston, Massachusetts.

== Career ==
=== 2002–2005: The Northern Hues ===
In response to a Craigslist ad in late 2002, Avidan joined the indie rock band the Northern Hues, a Philadelphia-based ensemble composed of Aron Brand, Jeff Rains, Alex Yaker, Justin "J" Earley, and Ian Creech. Avidan acted as the group's lead-singer, and wrote most of the band's lyrics, having recently moved to Philadelphia. They released one self-titled EP on December 14th, 2004 and one live track recorded July 16th, 2005, at World Cafe Live in Philadelphia. In mid-2005, the band split up; Avidan attributes the separation to personality conflicts and creative differences between the band's members, as well as a collective inability to gain greater recognition and success.

=== 2006–present: Skyhill ===
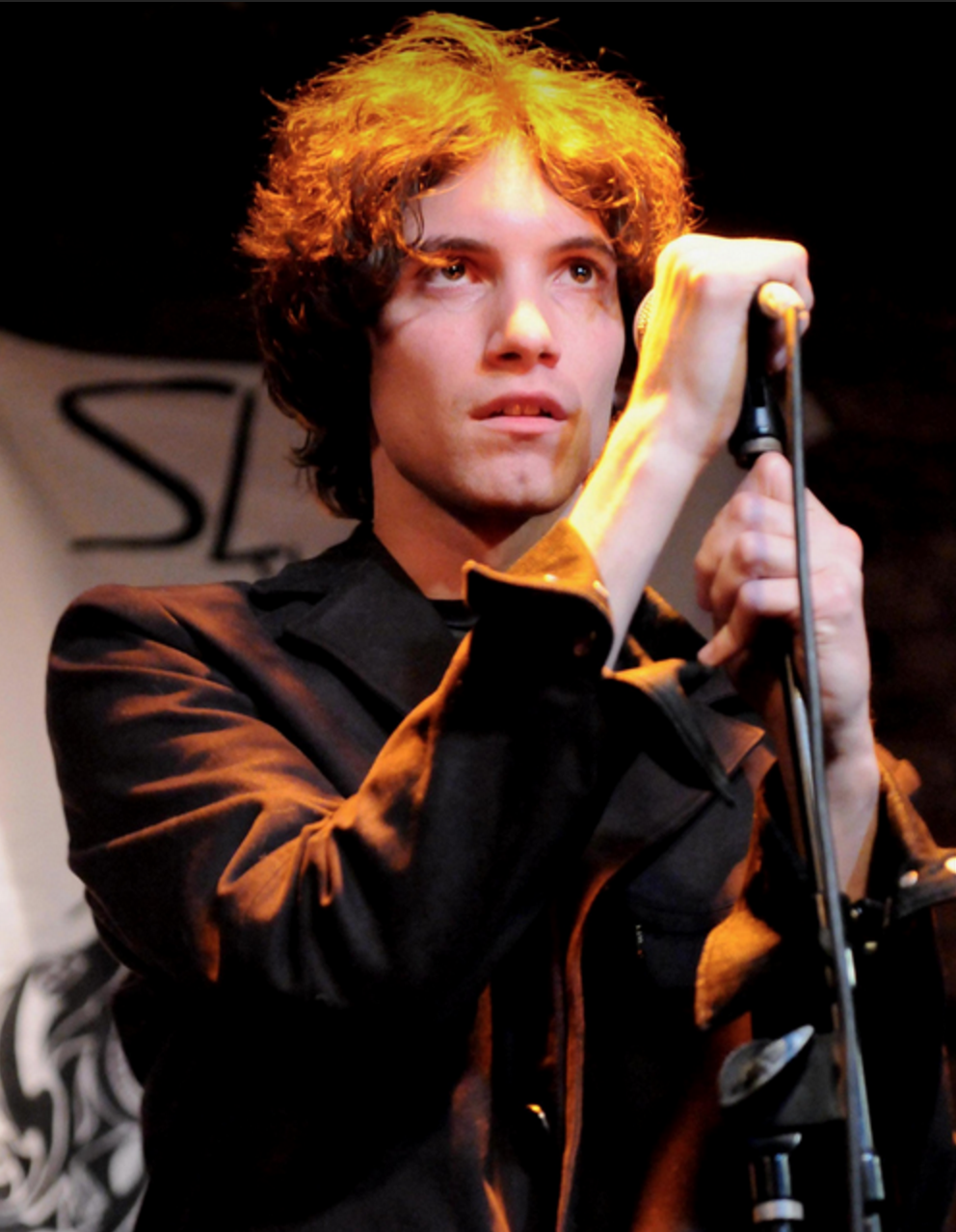
Avidan performing with Skyhill at The Bitter End in 2008

In the winter of 2006, Avidan teamed up with Peter Lennox to form a Brooklyn-based alternative rock duo named Skyhill. Again, Avidan acted as lead singer and assistant lyricist; the group released one full album, titled Run With the Hunted, on May 16, 2007. They toured New York in early 2008, before eventually separating due to lost passion. On October 7, 2015, Avidan and Lennox returned to release the standalone single "Firefly", which was acclaimed for the band's "maturing in both lyrics and sound" over their previous album. In July 2018, Avidan stated that Skyhill may start new projects in the future, but that nothing was in the works as of then.

On October 30, 2020, the group released the single "Howling at the Moon" on YouTube, with an eventual release on streaming services in mid-November of the same year. At the end of 2020, it was announced via the Skyhill website that the band would be working on a new album. The album, titled Out in the Moonlight, released on October 13, 2023.

=== 2009–present: Ninja Sex Party ===
In 2008, Avidan began studying storytelling and improv at the Upright Citizens Brigade Theatre in New York, under the guidance of Zach Woods and Margot Leitman, and had conceptualized the possibility of a new musical project. In need of another band member, Avidan was introduced to Brian Wecht, the musical director of another troupe, by mutual friends at the theatre in early 2009.

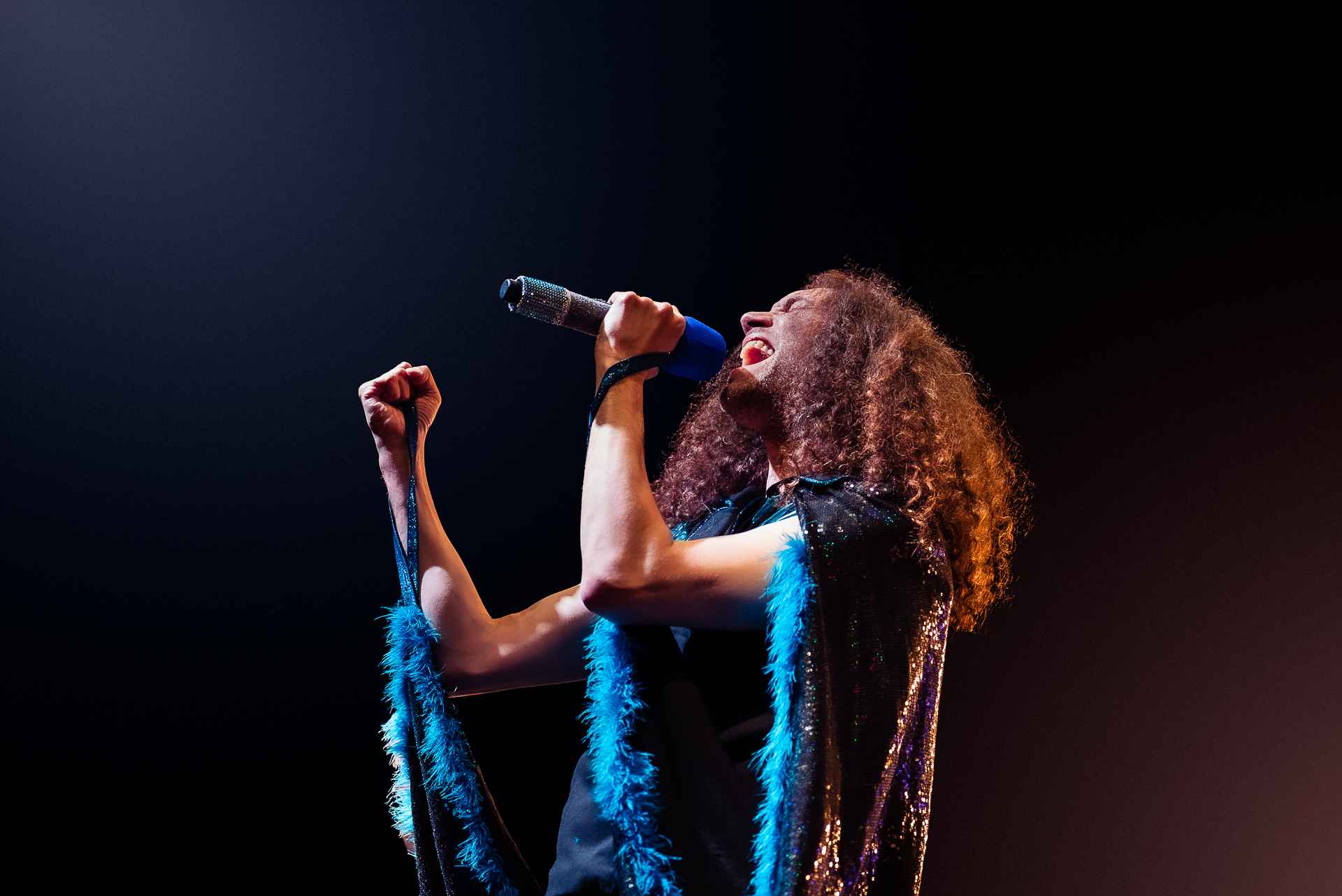
Avidan as "Danny Sexbang," performing at NX Newcastle April 29th, 2026

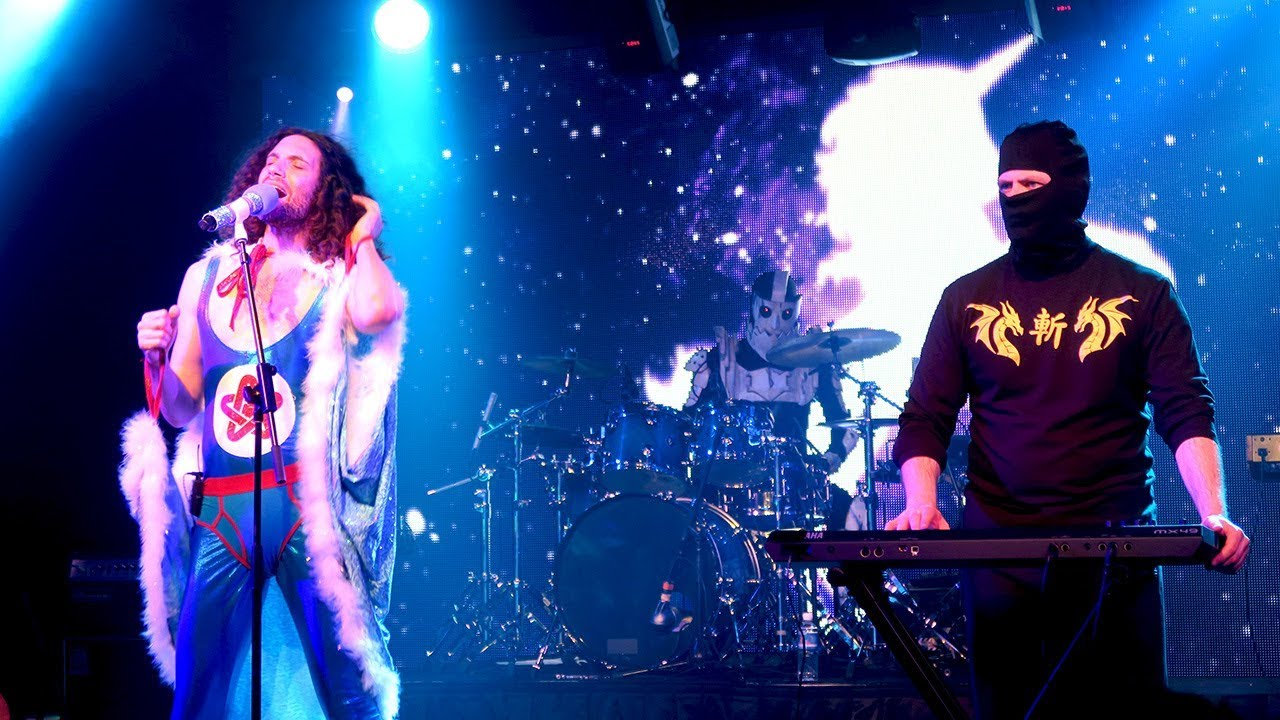
Ninja Sex Party performing with TWRP at The Republik in Honolulu on February 22, 2019

Avidan had already chosen the name "Ninja Sex Party," after "everybody's three favorite things," and worked together with Wecht to create characters to represent the band. They eventually settled on "Danny Sexbang" as Avidan's character, and "Ninja Brian" as Wecht's. The duo first gained popularity by performing as a musical guest on Leitman's improvisational comedy show Stripped Stories. Inspired by Tenacious D and Flight of the Conchords, the band is about "a Jewish superhero who wears a unitard, with his best friend, a ninja, and together they sing songs about dicks, and try to hit on women, unsuccessfully." They were also inspired by the work of The Lonely Island to produce music videos and post them to YouTube.

The group has released several studio albums and singles, many of which have charted on Billboard. As of November of 2025, they have released six original albums, four cover albums, one remastered compilation, a live album, and a re-recording album, the latter two of which cover songs from their previous albums. On September 17, 2018, the band, along with Tupper Ware Remix Party, performed a censored version of "Danny Don't You Know" on the late-night talk show Conan as a musical guest, making their live television debut.

The band has also appeared in various film festivals and conventions, including SXSW, Dragon Con, the now-defunct LACS and MAGFest.

=== 2013–present: Game Grumps, Starbomb, and other projects ===
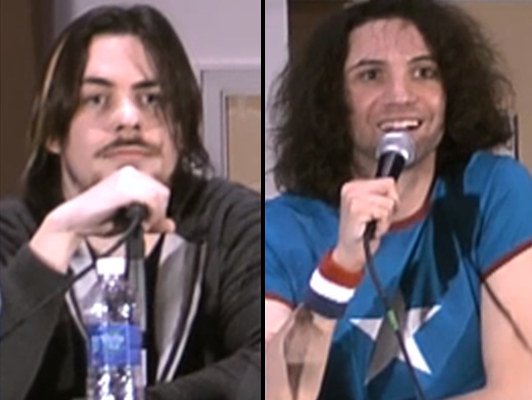
Arin Hanson (Egoraptor) and Avidan, hosts of Game Grumps, in 2015

In 2013, Arin Hanson, co-creator of the comedy gaming YouTube channel Game Grumps, brought Avidan on the show to replace Jon Jafari as co-host, after being introduced to Ninja Sex Party's content by fellow animator Ross O'Donovan. Hanson had previously animated part of the band's music video for "Dinosaur Laser Fight" in 2011. Avidan's first appearances on the show had been originally met with a negative response from fans, with the number of dislikes on each consecutive video increasing. However, fans eventually rejected their initial disapproval of a new co-host after witnessing the chemistry between the two hosts, further introducing the Game Grumps channel to more professional content and new audiences.

Avidan would join O'Donovan as co-host of the Game Grumps spin-off show Steam Train, where both hosts play PC games, as opposed to console games. Avidan remained a co-host of the show until its discontinuation. In addition to this, Avidan has acted as a co-host of other shows from the Game Grumps platform, including Grumpcade, Table Flip, and Steam Rolled, as well as providing narration for Hunting Monsters.

In late 2013, Avidan teamed up with Wecht and Hanson to announce a side project band named Starbomb, with Avidan as the backup singer. The band writes parody songs about video games, bringing together the sexually provocative music stylings of Avidan's Ninja Sex Party and the video game-based humor of Hanson. As of 2025, the group has released four albums, the first three of which have placed on various Billboard charts.

In 2015, Internet personalities Jesse Cox and Michele Morrow began developing an untitled comedy webseries for YouTube Premium, casting Avidan as eSports coach Alex Taylor, alongside Hanson's character, Ryland Smith. After Dan Harmon joined as an executive producer in 2016, the project gained media traction, and was formally announced at VidCon 2017 with the title Good Game. The esports-based series involves Avidan alongside Arin Hanson portraying best friends entering a gaming competition in order to win the grand prize of $1 million. Six serialized episodes were uploaded to the Game Grumps YouTube channel, with the first episode being free-to-view, and concurrent episodes requiring a YouTube Premium subscription. Avidan's performance was very well received by critics, and was cited as "truly fun, believable", and "shining a light on the potential of other projects."

In late 2021, Avidan announced that he had started a new rock band with fellow musician Jim Roach, named Shadow Academy. Their debut single "White Whale" was officially released alongside a music video on January 28, 2022. On February 25, 2022, they released their second single, "Once and Never More", alongside an animated music video. Their debut album was released on April 22, 2022.

=== Other ventures ===
In 2009, Avidan and producer William J. Sullivan collaborated to compose and sell multiple theme and background tracks for various shows while Avidan studied in New York, with clients ranging from Power Rangers RPM to White Collar.

In 2012, Avidan briefly partnered with Mondo Media to host a sketch comedy miniseries called Dirty Shorts, in which Avidan portrayed an exaggerated version of himself, similar to that of Danny Sexbang. The series was not received well, and was dropped after the first 12-episode season. Avidan has commented that the Mondo Media staff experience was welcoming, although he was not confident that the way his character was written would appeal to audiences. Avidan also co-created, co-wrote, and provided voice acting for the studio's short-lived animated comedy miniseries DJs in PJs with Wecht. Avidan returned to Mondo in September 2013 to compose "Dick Figures: The Movie: The Song" for the Dick Figures: The Movie soundtrack with Wecht.

Avidan performing with Steel Panther at the House of Blues in West Hollywood in 2015

Avidan has appeared on various YouTube webseries as a guest, including Did You Know Gaming?, a webseries dedicated to video game trivia, Good Mythical Morning, a variety show hosted by Rhett and Link, and Nacho Punch, a sketch comedy webseries.

On August 3, 2015, Avidan performed with Steel Panther at their West Hollywood House of Blues venue, singing "Party All Day". The two have collaborated on multiple occasions, with Steel Panther making a cameo in Ninja Sex Party's "Road Trip" music video, and providing vocals for "6969".

Avidan is the co-creator and co-host of the football-centric podcast Balls in Your Ear, along with Josh Sprague.

Avidan, alongside co-creator Kyle Carrozza, performed the theme song for the Cartoon Network series Mighty Magiswords. Avidan also provided the voice of the character Dan in the sixth episode of the second season, "Changeable Terraingable". According to Carrozza, Avidan's take on the character was an impression of his father.

In September 2017, the band Night Runner released an album entitled Thunderbird, which featured Avidan on the fourth track, called "Magnum Bullets". A music video was released in February 2020, with animation from Knights of the Light Table.

In May 2018, Tupper Ware Remix Party released an album entitled Together Through Time, which featured Avidan on the ninth track, called "Starlight Brigade". A music video was released in May 2019, also featuring animation from Knights of the Light Table. The video was aired on Adult Swim's late-night anime block Toonami on August 3, 2019.

On April 17, 2020, Avidan released a collaborative album of acoustic covers together with previous NSP collaborators Super Guitar Bros, titled Dan Avidan & Super Guitar Bros; the first single, a cover of Seal's "Kiss from a Rose", was released earlier that month.

On September 12, 2024, Avidan was announced as a voice actor for an indie stop motion studio called Apartment D Films, a studio both Ninja Sex Party and Game Grumps has collaborated with in the past. He will play the role of 'Ruff Ruff Red' in their upcoming series Ruff Ruff Danger Dogs.

== Personal life ==
Avidan announced his marriage to his wife, Ashley Anderson, who is an artist, on an episode of Game Grumps, which was uploaded on February 2, 2022.

== Discography ==
=== The Northern Hues ===
EPs

Title	Album details
The Northern Hues EP	Released: December 14, 2004; Label: Self-released; Formats: CD, Digital download
World Cafe Live 2005	Released: July 16, 2005; Label: Self-released; Formats: CD

=== Skyhill ===
Studio albums

Title	Album details
Run with the Hunted	Released: May 16, 2007; Label: Self-released; Formats: CD, Digital download
Out in the Moonlight	Released: October 13, 2023; Label: Self-released; Formats: CD, vinyl, digital download

Singles

Title	Year	Album
"Firefly"	2015	Non-album single
"Howling at the Moon"	2020	Out in the Moonlight
"The Last Domino"	2023	Out in the Moonlight

=== Ninja Sex Party ===
- NSFW (2011)
- Strawberries and Cream (2013)
- Attitude City (2015)
- Under the Covers (Cover Album, 2016)
- Under the Covers, Vol. II (Cover Album, 2017)
- Cool Patrol (2018)
- Under the Covers, Vol. III (Cover Album, 2019)
- The Prophecy (2020)
- Level Up (Rerecording, 2021)
- The Very, Very, Very, Very Classy Acoustic Album (Live Album, 2021)
- These Nuts (2024)
- Under the Covers, Vol. IV (Cover Album, 2025)

=== Starbomb ===
- Starbomb (2013)
- Player Select (2014)
- The TryForce (2019)
- Starbomb Boom: Rise of Lyrics (2024)

=== Shadow Academy ===
Studio albums

Title	Album details
Shadow Academy	Released: April 22, 2022; Label: Self-released; Formats: CD, Digital download, vinyl
Prisms	Released: August 8, 2025; Label: Self-released; Formats: CD, vinyl, digital download

Singles

Title	Year	Album
"Once and Never More"	2022	Shadow Academy
"Invisible"	2022	Shadow Academy
"White Whale"	2022	Shadow Academy
"One Way Mirror"	2025	Prisms
"Icarus"	2025	Prisms
"Prisms"	2025	Prisms

=== Solo ===
- Dan Avidan & Super Guitar Bros (2020)
- Dan Avidan & Super Guitar Bros 2 (2023)
- Dan Avidan & Super Guitar Bros 3 (2025)
- Dan Avidan & Super Guitar Bros 4 (2026)

=== As a guest ===
- William J. Sullivan – "Backside" (2014)
- Kyle Carrozza – "Mighty Magiswords" (2015)
- Night Runner – "Magnum Bullets" (2017)
- TWRP – "The No Pants Dance" (2017)
- TWRP – "Starlight Brigade" (2018)^{1}
- Skyfactor – "A Thousand Sounds" (2018)
- NateWantsToBattle – "My Own Worst Enemy (Lit cover ft. Dan Avidan of Ninja Sex Party)" (2020)
- TWRP – "Black Swan" (2020)
- TWRP – "The Eve of the War" (2022)
- Red Spring Studio – "Every Time We Touch" (2024)

^{1}For Tupper Ware Remix Party songs in which Avidan sang as a member of Ninja Sex Party, see TWRP songs featuring NSP.

== Filmography ==
=== Film ===
Year	Title	Role
2019	A Heist with Markiplier	Alien 2
2022	In Space with Markiplier	Sexy Crew
Unreleased	The Players' Score: A Video Game Music Documentary	Himself

=== Television ===
Year	Title	Role	Notes
2018	Mighty Magiswords	Dan (voice)	Episode: "Changeable Terraingable"
2018	Conan	Himself	Musical guest (as Ninja Sex Party)

=== Web series ===
Year	Title	Role	Notes
2012	Dirty Shorts	Himself	12 episodes
2012	DJs in PJs	Slice (voice)	2 episodes
2013–present	Game Grumps	Himself	Co-host
2013–2014	Nacho Punch	Uncredited	2 episodes
2013	Idiots Always Ask	Himself	3 episodes
2013	The Indoor Kids	Himself (voice)	Episode: "Getting Grumpy With The Game Grumps"
2014	Dick Figures	Danny Sexbang	Episode: "DFTM Fan Music Video feat. Ninja Sex Party"
2014	Co-Optitude	Himself (voice)	Episode: "Twisted Metal"
2015	Did You Know Gaming?	Himself (voice)	Episode: "Guitar Hero"
2015	Red vs. Blue	Lap Fed (voice)	2 episodes
2015	On the Spot	Himself	Episode: "RTX 2015 (ft. Game Grumps)"
2015	Your Grammar Sucks	Danny Sexbang	"YOUR GRAMMAR SUCKS #100"
2015–2017	Good Mythical Morning	Himself	2 episodes
2016	Jash	Waiter	Episode: "#DoYourJob"
2016	MatPat's Game Lab	Himself	Episode: "Can Gamers Defuse BOMBS?"
2016	The Legacy Music Hour	Himself (voice)	Episode: "Technical Difficulties"
2017	Harmontown	Himself (voice)	Episode: "Down with Sighty"
2017	Good Game	Alex Taylor	6 episodes
2018	YouTubers React	Himself	Various episodes
2018	SuperMegaCast	Himself	Episode: "Dan's Big Secret"
2018–present	10 Minute Power Hour	Himself	Co-host
2021	Eddsworld	Super Lad	Episode: "The Beaster Bunny"
2021	Space Quest - The Movie	Xenonian Official	Fan movie

=== As writer ===
Year	Title	Notes
2012	DJs in PJs	2 episodes
2013	The Mythical Show	3 episodes
2013	"Have You Ever"	Co-writer; The Mythical Show music video
2013	"CLOWN SHARK SONG"	Co-writer; The Mythical Show music video
2013	"YO MAMA BATTLE (of Compliments)"	Co-writer; The Mythical Show music video
2013	"Famous Last Words 2"	Co-writer; The Mythical Show sketch
2013	"Breaking Bad: The Middle School Musical"	Co-writer; The Mythical Show music video
2013	"Epic Rap Battle: Nerd vs. Geek"	Co-writer; Rhett & Link music video

=== Video games ===
Year	Title	Role
2015	Default Dan	Secret Playable Character
2016	Pulsar Arena	Danny Sexbang
2017	Pinstripe	Daniel the Monster
2017	Dream Daddy: A Dad Dating Simulator	Robert
2018	Monster Prom	Fellow Student
2019	River City Girls	Billy Lee
2020	House Party	Dan
Unreleased	Hex Heroes	Danny

== Awards ==
Year	Award Show	Category	Work	Result	Ref
2010	INNY Awards	Best Original Comedy Song	"I Just Want to (Dance)"	Won	
2010	INNY Awards	Best Comedy Video Short	"I Just Want to (Dance)"	Won	
2014	Webby Awards	People's Voice – Comedy: Individual Short or Episode	"Breaking Bad: The Middle School Musical"	Won	
2014	Webby Awards	Webby Award – Comedy: Individual Short or Episode	"Breaking Bad: The Middle School Musical"	Nominated	

== See also ==
- List of YouTubers
