= Ninja Sex Party =

American musical comedy duo

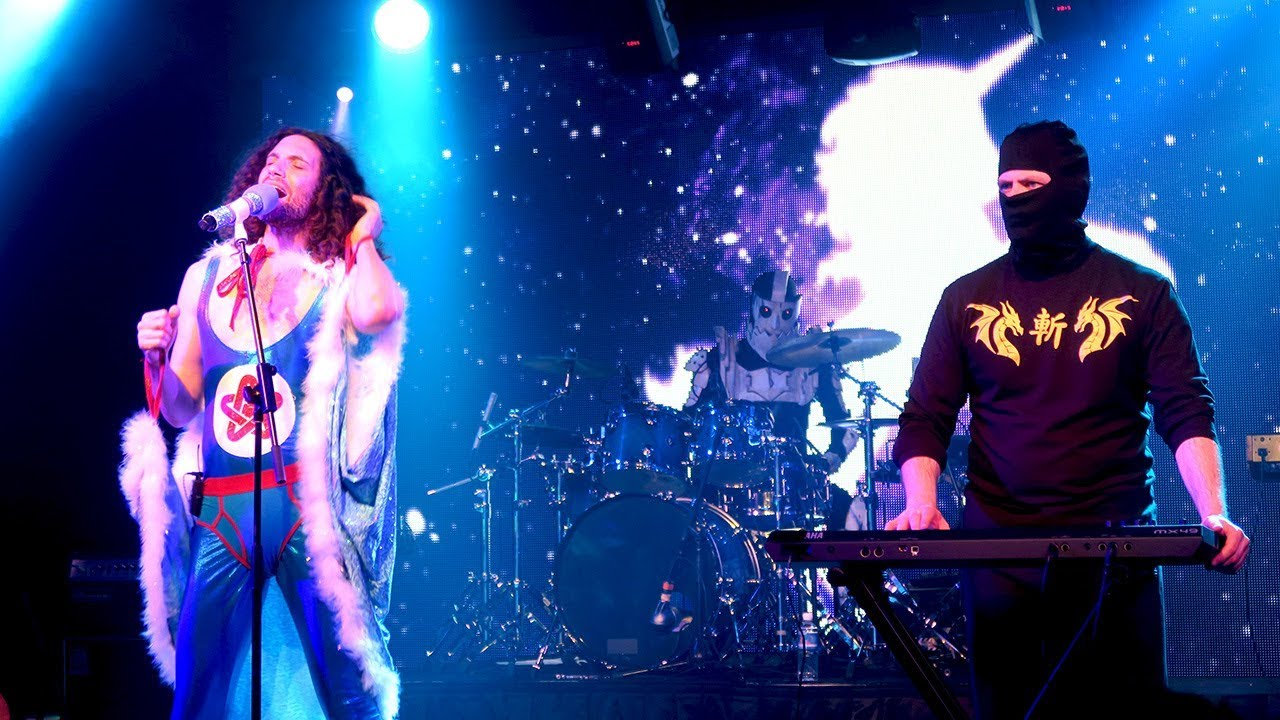
- Avidan (left) and Wecht performing in 2019, with TWRP drummer Havve Hogan in the background

Background information
- Also known as: NSP
- Origin: New York City, U.S.
- Genres: Comedy rock; electronic rock; comedy; rock
- Years active: 2009–present
- Spinoffs: Starbomb
- Members: Danny Sexbang; Ninja Brian
- Website: ninjasexparty.com

Ninja Sex Party (often abbreviated as NSP) is an American musical comedy rock duo consisting of singer Dan Avidan and keyboardist Brian Wecht. They formed in 2009 in New York City and are currently based in Los Angeles. They are also part of the musical trio Starbomb with friend and collaborator Arin Hanson.

The work of Ninja Sex Party typically consists of rock or synth-pop-oriented humorous songs, frequently on the topics of sex, seduction, love or fantasy, with Avidan and Wecht respectively portraying the characters of Danny Sexbang, an idiotic, exuberant, hypersexual Jewish man who tries to hit on women with varying degrees of success; and Ninja Brian, a non-verbal, extremely homicidal ninja with whom Danny is best friends.

To date, NSP has released thirteen studio albums (six consisting of original material, four cover albums, one remix album, one live album and a compilation album), in addition to four albums as a part of Starbomb. Their Under the Covers cover album series that began in 2016 saw them take on a non-comedic approach to music for the first time, covering various songs from the 1970s, 1980s and 1990s.

Wecht initially acted as record producer and performed all instrumentation on their early albums, until they started working with producer Jim Arsenault (and later Jim Roach) and backing band TWRP in 2015. Wecht and Avidan have appeared in TWRP's own works, either as individuals or as Ninja Sex Party. Since May 2018, Wecht also portrays Ninja Brian on his own live comedy show titled Ninja Brian's All-Star Variety Luau Spectacular. Every non-cover album that the group has released has reached #1 on the Comedy Albums chart, and their highest-peaking album on the Billboard 200 chart was #17 despite being independent.

== Career ==
=== Formation and early career (2009–2012) ===
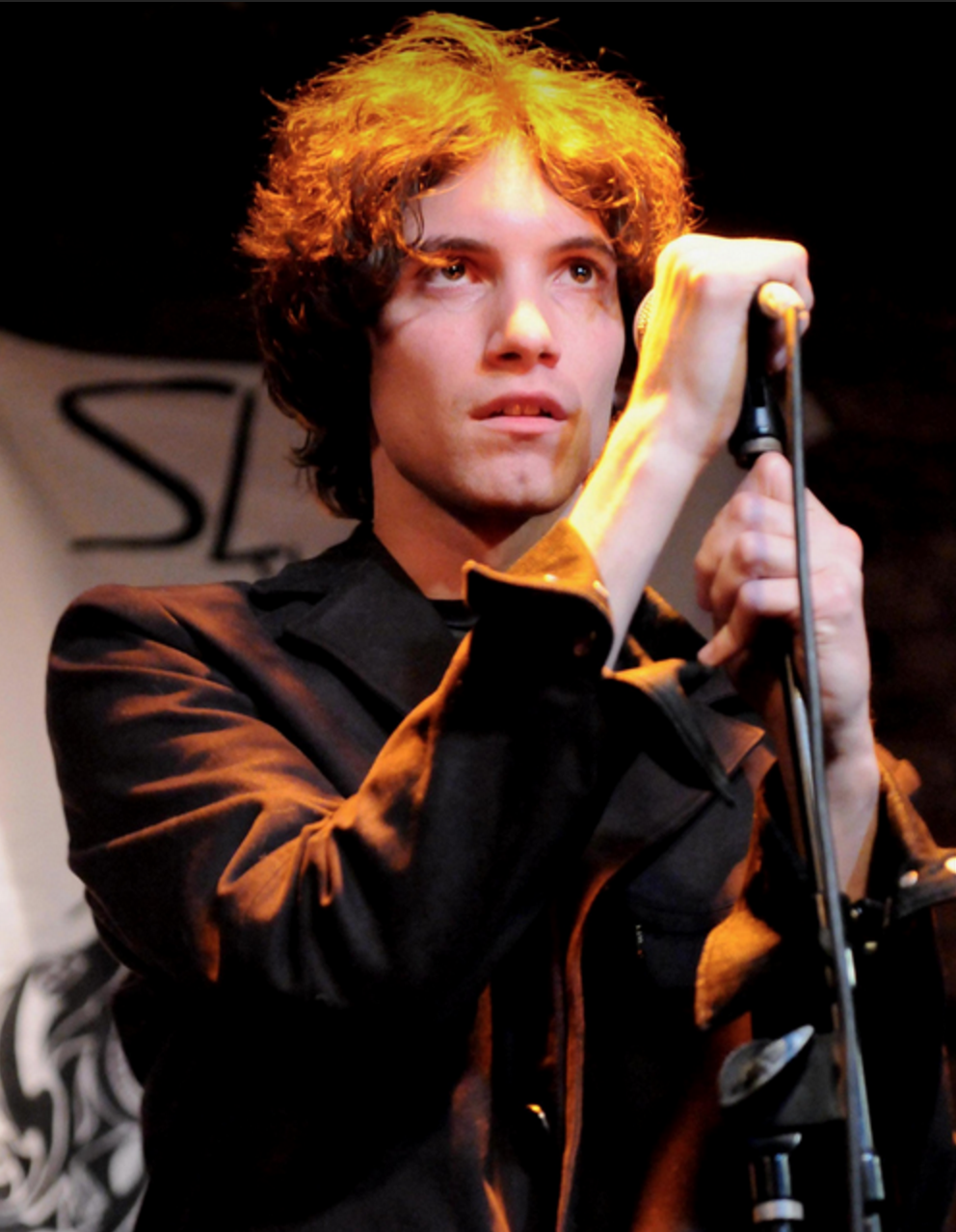
Avidan performing with his previous band Skyhill in 2008

Avidan, who previously sang in bands such as The Northern Hues and Skyhill, initially conceptualized the band. In need of a band member, Avidan was introduced to Wecht, who was the musical director of a comedy troupe in New York, by a mutual friend at the Upright Citizens Brigade Theatre, Julie Katz, a member of Wecht's comedy troupe (who would later be featured in their music video "The Decision"), to whom Avidan had asked if she knew any musicians. The band was formed in February/March 2009 with Avidan going by his stage-name/character "Danny Sexbang" and Wecht going by "Ninja Brian". However, the character "Danny Sexbang" was originally named "Danny Sweetnuts" before being changed to "Sexbang" as Avidan felt the name seemed "stronger."

Inspired by The Lonely Island and Flight of the Conchords, Ninja Sex Party is about "a Jewish superhero who wears a unitard, with his best friend who's a ninja, and together they sing songs about dicks, and try to hit [unsuccessfully] on women." The original goal of the project was to attempt to create a sitcom series similar to Flight of the Conchords.

They began performing together that summer, appearing in various film festivals, including SXSW, Dragon Con, and the LACS. They were awarded the "Trophy of Awesomeness" on Vimeo's video website. They won "Best Comedy Video Short" and "Best Comedy Song" in Improvisation News' 2010 INNY Awards. Their video "Sex Training" also appeared on the Comedy page of The Huffington Post. All their early music videos were directed, shot, and edited by Jim Turner, who was the only person paid for his involvement; all other people participating were friends working for free.

In 2011, they released their first album NSFW, which stands for Not Safe For Women on iTunes, which contained both original songs, and all of their previously released songs on YouTube.

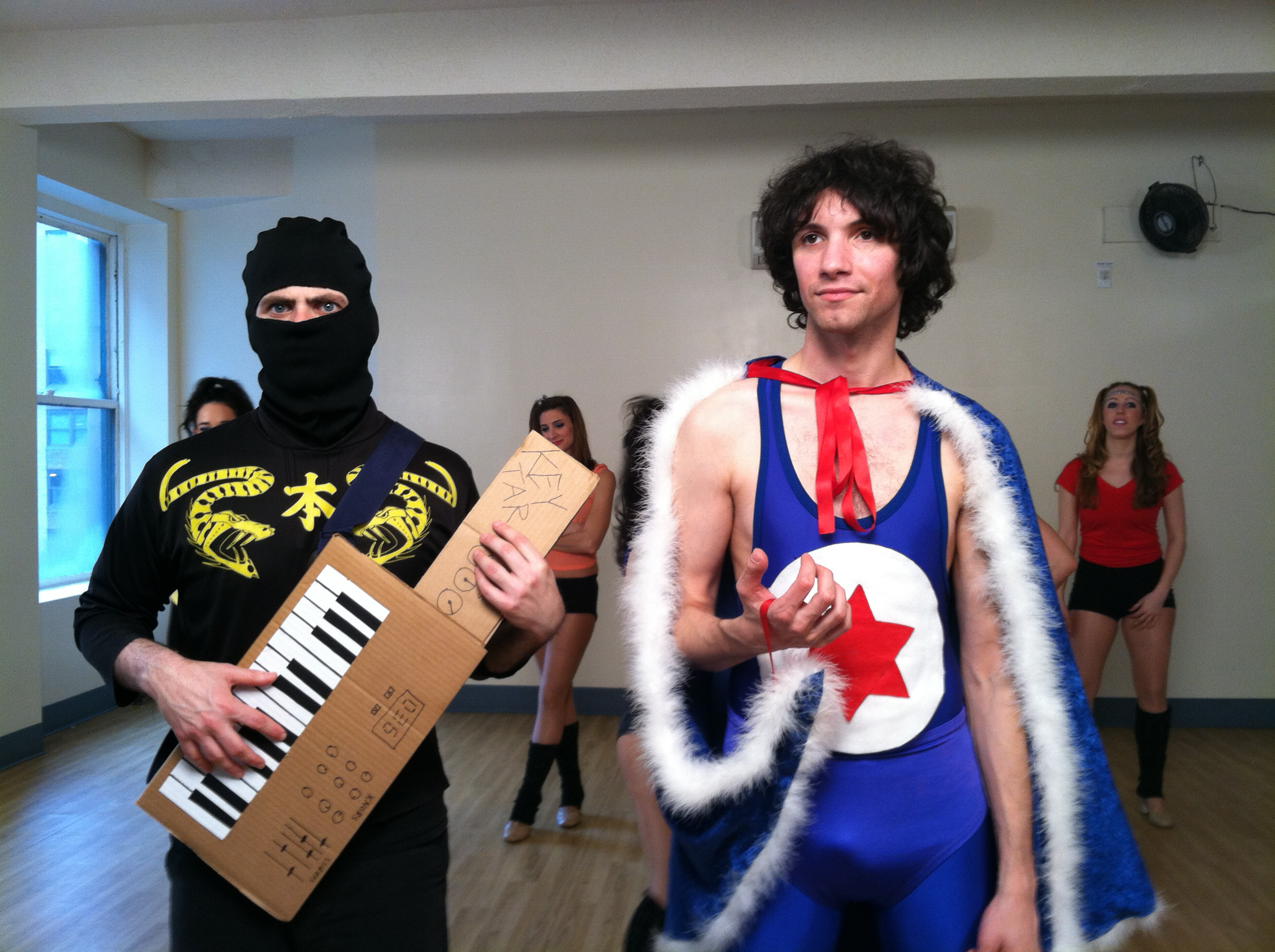
Filming of the music video for "Next to You" in 2012

=== Commercial success and side projects (2013–2015) ===
The band released their second album, Strawberries and Cream, in April 2013. On the week of May 4, 2013, the album debuted at #9 on Billboard's Comedy Albums charts.

In July the band released the single "Party of Three", off their third album. The song featured an appearance by animator and Internet personality Arin Hanson.

In September 2013, the band composed "Dick Figures: The Movie: The Song" for Mondo Media's Dick Figures: The Movie soundtrack.

In late 2013, Avidan, Wecht, and Hanson teamed up to create a side project band named Starbomb, with Avidan as the lead singer-songwriter. The band writes parody songs about video games, bringing together the sexually provocative music stylings of Ninja Sex Party and the video game-based humor of Hanson.

On the week of February 15, 2014, Starbomb, the group's eponymous album, would hold the #1 spot in Comedy Albums for 4 consecutive weeks. Starbomb also reached #1 on the Billboard Top Heatseekers charts for 2 consecutive weeks, starting with the week of January 4, 2014. In July 2014, Ninja Sex Party performed a concert for San Diego Comic-Con at Petco Park. They also released the music video for "Why I Cry" during the concert.

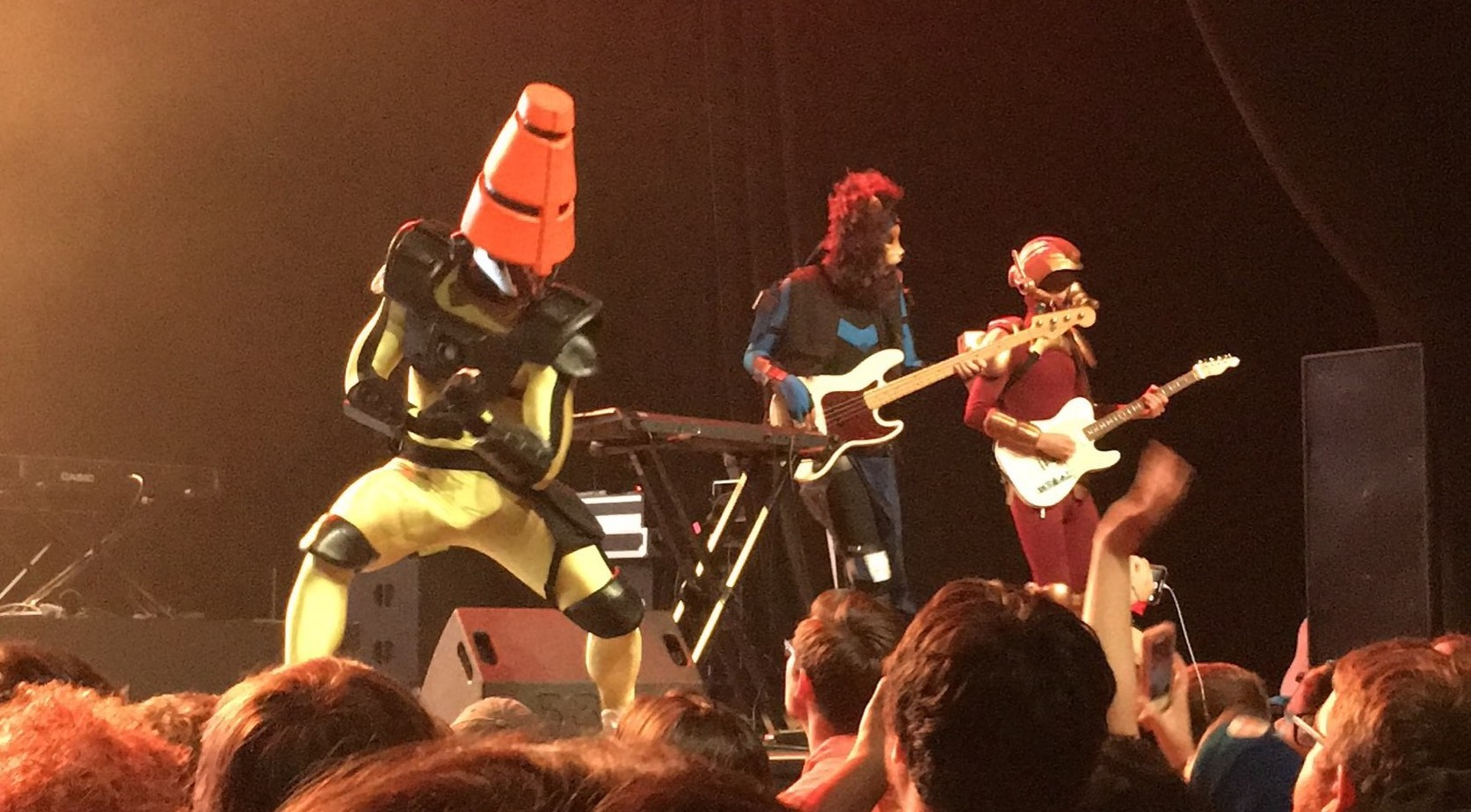
TWRP (from left to right: band members Doctor Sung, Commander Meouch and Lord Phobos) became Ninja Sex Party's backup band in 2015.

In 2015, two singles were released by the band TWRP, collaborating with Ninja Sex Party, titled "The Hit" and "Baby, NYC"; from that point on, TWRP became NSP's backing band on both live shows and studio releases, while also serving as their opening act on live shows.

Their third album, Attitude City, released on July 17, 2015. It was one of the top 20 best-selling albums on Amazon, and peaked at #1 on Billboard's US Comedy Albums chart.

On August 3, 2015, Ninja Sex Party performed with Steel Panther at their House of Blues venue, singing "Party All Day." The bands have collaborated on multiple occasions, with Steel Panther making a cameo in the band's "Road Trip" music video, singer Michael Starr providing vocals for "6969", and Satchel performing guitars on "Limelight".

On October 7, 2015, Avidan released the single "Firefly" with Peter Lennox. The two had previously worked together as the atmospheric band Skyhill from 2006 to 2007.

=== Under the Covers albums and Cool Patrol (2016–2019) ===
On February 23, 2016, a music video was released for their cover of "Take On Me"; the video for their cover of "Everybody Wants to Rule the World" was released one week later, on March 1, 2016. On March 4, 2016, Under the Covers was released to the public. The album features guests appearances by TWRP and Super Guitar Bros. The album debuted on the Billboard charts at #9 in Top Album Sales, #2 in Independent Albums, #3 in Rock Albums, and #17 in the Top 200 Albums.

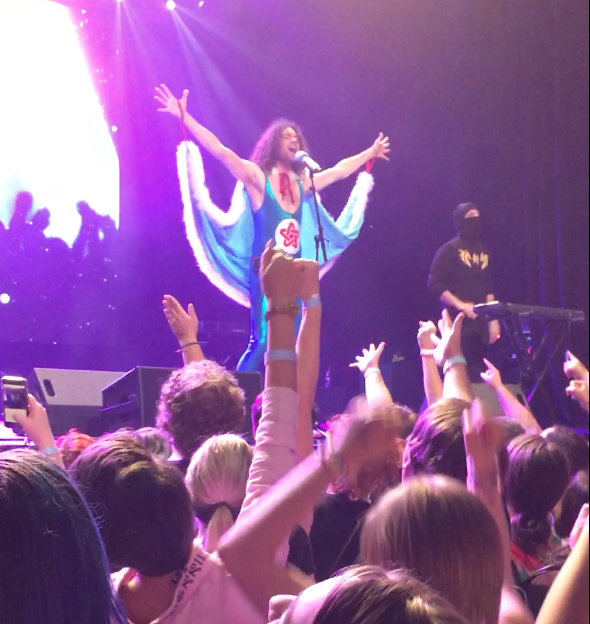
Ninja Sex Party performing in Dallas in August 2018, as a part of their "Tour de Force" tour.

In 2017, they released their second cover album, Under the Covers, Vol. II.

In May 2018, Wecht debuted Ninja Brian's All-Star Variety Luau Spectacular, his own recurring live musical comedy show in which he portrays his Ninja Brian character, minus Avidan. The band also started a new tour, titled Tour de Force, concurrently with the release of the new album.

On June 25, 2018, the band released the music video for the song "Danny Don't You Know", along with the official release date of Cool Patrol, August 17. The video featured actor Finn Wolfhard, a friend of Avidan since he had appeared on Game Grumps in January 2017 and a fan of the band, as a younger Danny Sexbang. The band called "Danny Don't You Know" their "favorite-ever song", both musically and as a video. Cool Patrol was released on August 17, 2018, and reached #1 on the Billboard Top Comedy Albums chart.

In August 2018, Avidan and Wecht hosted an AMA on Reddit where Avidan confirmed that "(Don't Fear) The Reaper" by Blue Öyster Cult, "Sledgehammer" by Peter Gabriel, "Glory of Love" by Peter Cetera, and "Down Under" by Men at Work would appear on Under the Covers, Vol. III. The duo then went on to tell RIFF Magazine that the album would also include covers of songs by Rush, Def Leppard, the Bee Gees, and Michael Jackson.

On September 17, 2018, Ninja Sex Party, along with TWRP, performed a censored version of "Danny Don't You Know" on the late-night talk show Conan as a musical guest, making their live television debut. This censored version, which replaced the word "fuck" with "heck" and "hell," was released on Spotify on September 21 under the title "Danny Don't You Know (Cool as Heck Version)".

In December 2018, the band was selected by Billboard as the #1 Comedy Album Artist of the year, with Cool Patrol being selected as the #1 comedy album of the year.

On August 1, 2019, German YouTube personality and musician Flula Borg released the song "Self-Care Sunday", featuring Ninja Sex Party. In November 2019, the band released Under the Covers, Vol. III.

=== The Prophecy, The Very, Very, Very, Very Classy Acoustic Album and Level Up (2019–2021) ===
On November 25, 2019, the band premiered a new original song, "The Mystic Crystal", their longest song yet at almost 12 minutes. The video was subsequently released on June 9, 2021.

On December 14, 2019, the band released "The Decision Part 2: Ten Years Later", a music video celebrating the band's 10 year anniversary and acting as a sequel to "The Decision", Ninja Sex Party's second-ever song originally released on December 14, 2009; the video also revealed the title of their next original album, The Prophecy.

On April 1, 2020, they released the music video for "I Don't Know What We're Talking About".

In September 28, The Prophecy was released. The album debuted at #1 on Billboard's Comedy Albums chart.

On April 30, 2021, Ninja Sex Party (alongside producer Jim Roach on acoustic guitar) streamed "The Very, Very, Very, Very Classy Acoustic Performance", a stripped back mix of both Ninja Sex Party originals and covers.This performance was later released as The Very, Very, Very, Very Classy Acoustic Album that year on December 27, 2021.

The album Level Up was released on October 22, 2021, and debuted at #1 on the Billboard Comedy Albums chart.

=== These Nuts (2023–2024) ===
On February 17, 2023, the band announced the title for These Nuts alongside the music video for "I Own A Car". They would then release two more music videos, "Let's Save The Earth" on October 23, 2023, and "Galaxy Hamster", on January 26, 2024.

On March 8, 2024, the band's studio album These Nuts was officially released.

On May 28, 2024, the band posted on their social media, with the title "You are CORDIALLY invited to "NSP's 15 Year Anniversary: A Digital Concert Experience"!!!". Tickets for the event were for their Patreon subscribers only, including their free and paid subscribers. The extras that fans could purchase were tickets to their Q&A session after the performance, and a signed CD and LP of their upcoming "Masterstrokes" album.

On August 19, 2024, Masterstrokes: 15 Years of Elegance, a compilation album spanning 22 remasters of select songs from across Ninja Sex Party’s discography was released.

== Public image ==
Wecht manages all Ninja Sex Party social media accounts, as well as Starbomb's and formerly Game Grumps.

The mobile game Shooting Stars features a boss named Grump Dan, who is a reference to Danny Sexbang.

== Members ==
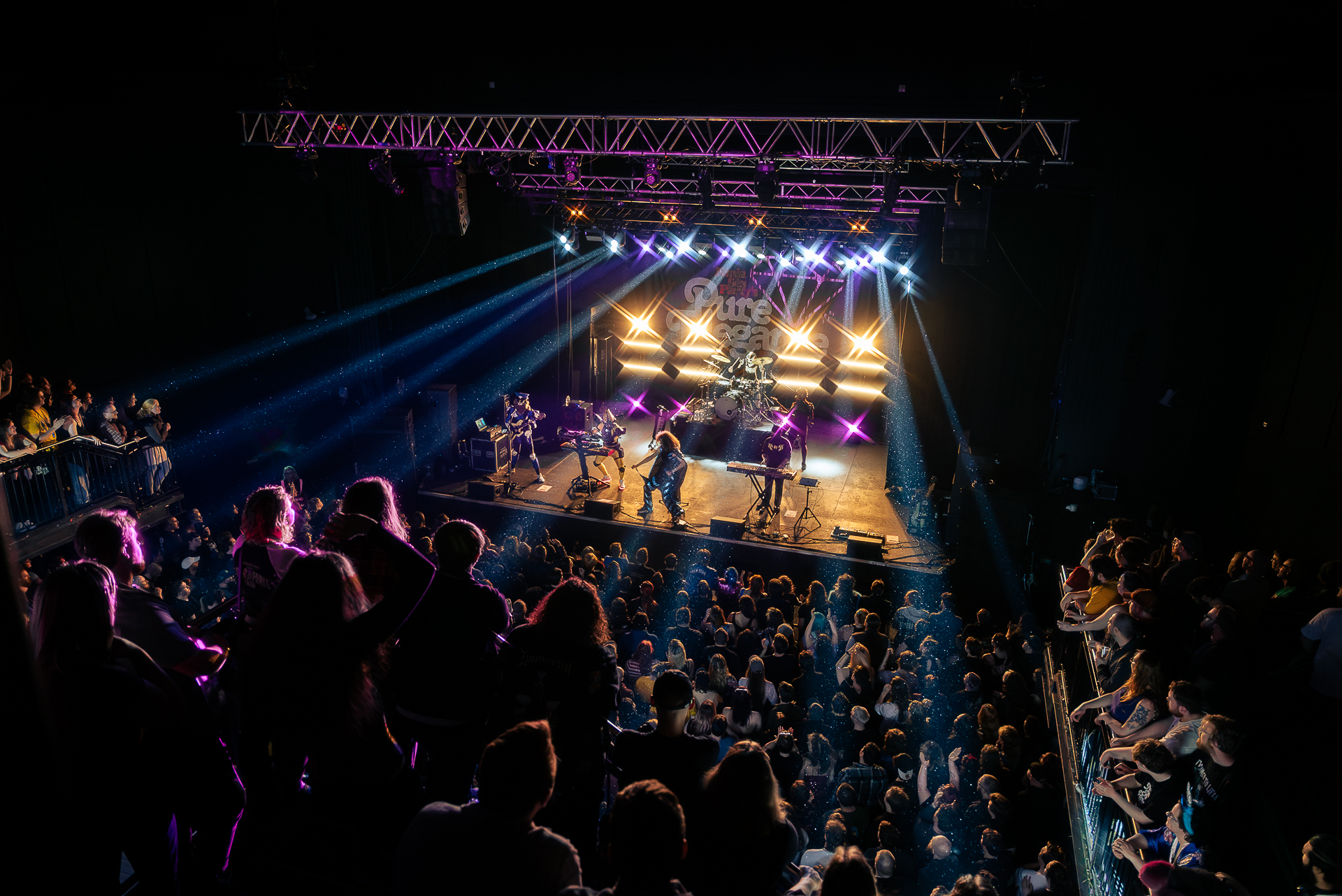
Ninja Sex Party performing with TWRP in Newcastle upon Tyne, England 2026

Band members

- Dan Avidan (Danny Sexbang) – lead vocals (2009–present)
- Brian Wecht (Ninja Brian) – keyboards, programming, spoken word, backing vocals (2009–present)

Session and touring musicians

- Arin Hanson – spoken word, backing vocals (2011–present; also performs Starbomb songs at NSP live shows)
- TWRP – backup band, opening act (2015–present)
  - Lord Phobos – guitars
  - Commander Meouch – bass, backing vocals
  - Doctor Sung – keyboards, synthesizers, keytar, talk box
  - Havve Hogan – drums

Timeline

== Discography ==
Original albums

- NSFW (2011)
- Strawberries and Cream (2013)
- Attitude City (2015)
- Cool Patrol (2018)
- The Prophecy (2020)
- Level Up (2021)
- The Very, Very, Very, Very Classy Acoustic Album (2021)
- These Nuts (2024)
- Teatime at Castle Fabulous (TBA)

Cover albums

- Under the Covers (2016)
- Under the Covers, Vol. II (2017)
- Under the Covers, Vol. III (2019)
- Under the Covers, Vol. IV (2025)
