= Brian Wecht =

American internet personality and musician (born 1975)

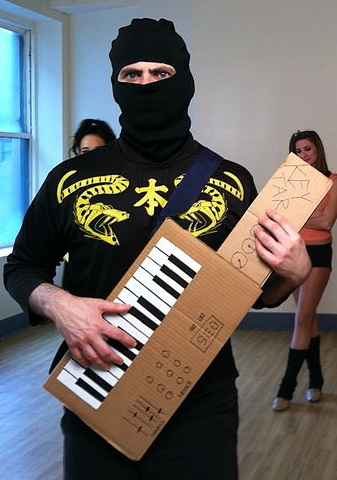
- Wecht as his Ninja Brian character in 2012
- Born: Brian Alexander Wecht; April 22, 1975 (age 51); Pompton Plains, New Jersey, U.S.
- Other names: Ninja Brian; Trey Magnifique
- Education: Williams College (B.A.), University of California, San Diego (PhD)
- Occupations: Theoretical physicist; musician; songwriter; record producer; Internet personality
- Years active: 2009–present
- Spouse: Rachel Bitney
- Children: 1
- Musical career
- Genres: Comedy rock; synth-rock; electronic rock
- Instruments: Keyboards; saxophone; clarinet
- Member of: Game Grumps; Ninja Sex Party; Starbomb
- Scientific career
- Fields: Theoretical physics
- Thesis: Topics in string theory and supersymmetry: a-maximization, nongeometric compactifications, and tachyon cosmology (2004)
- Doctoral advisor: Kenneth A. Intriligator

Brian Alexander Wecht, also known by his character name Ninja Brian, is an American musician, Internet personality, podcaster, and theoretical physicist. He is best known as a member of comedy musical duo Ninja Sex Party and video game-based comedy music trio Starbomb. He has also appeared on the Let's Play webseries Game Grumps, all three alongside Dan Avidan.

Wecht originally worked as a theoretical physicist, and notably held research positions at Harvard University, the Massachusetts Institute of Technology, the Institute for Advanced Study, the University of Michigan, and the Queen Mary University of London. Specialized in particle physics, his work included research on string theory, supersymmetry, and quantum field theory. He retired in 2015, choosing to join Game Grumps while focusing on his musical career. He is also the co-creator of The Story Collider, a science-based story telling podcast recorded in front of a live audience.

In Ninja Sex Party, Wecht plays the character of "Ninja Brian", a non-verbal, homicidal masked ninja, in both live shows and music videos. He performed all instruments on early Ninja Sex Party albums, until TWRP started acting as their backing band in 2015. Wecht also co-hosts the podcast Leighton Night with Brian Wecht and portrays Ninja Brian on his live comedy show titled Ninja Brian's All-Star Variety Luau Spectacular.

== Career ==
=== Education ===
Wecht attended Williams College and the University of California, San Diego where he obtained his PhD in particle physics in 2004. Wecht held research positions at Harvard University, the Center for Theoretical Physics at the Massachusetts Institute of Technology, the Institute for Advanced Study, and the University of Michigan, prior to becoming a faculty member at the Queen Mary University of London. While there, Wecht worked on string theory, supersymmetry, and quantum field theory.

Wecht has an extensive record of highly cited contributions. He retired in 2015 to join Game Grumps and dedicate himself to his music career.

=== Ninja Sex Party ===
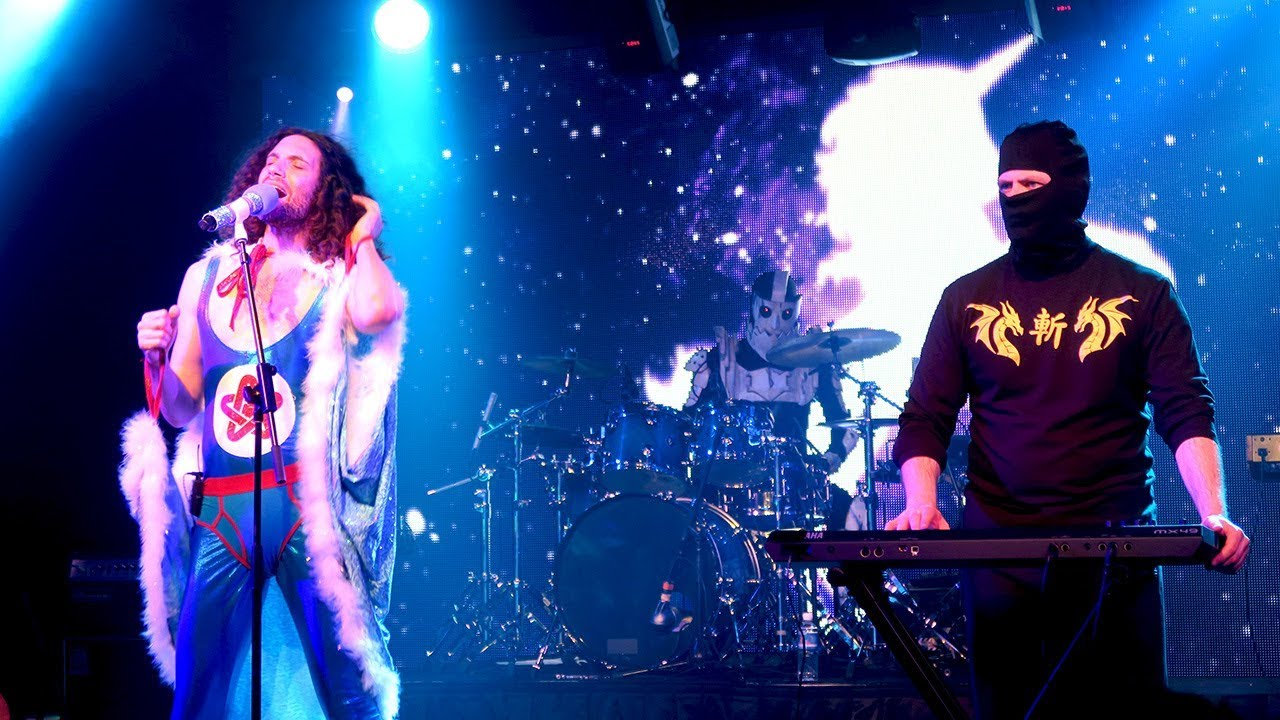
Ninja Sex Party performing in 2019

Prior to meeting Dan Avidan, Wecht was the musical director of an improv comedy troupe in New York. In 2009, Avidan, who had conceptualized Ninja Sex Party and was in search of a bandmate and/or producer, was introduced to Wecht by Julie Katz, a member of Wecht's comedy troupe (who would later be featured in Ninja Sex Party's music video "The Decision"), to whom Avidan had asked if she knew any musicians.

Specializing in humorous songs, both on stage or in their music videos, the duo started by appearing on various film festivals. They regularly published original songs on their YouTube channel, which progressively helped them in becoming popular, as well as studio albums on a regular basis. Although he only played keyboards on stage, Wecht performed all instruments on early Ninja Sex Party albums, including piano and drum machines, while Avidan was in charge of all vocals, except for occasional backing or spoken vocals by Wecht. Ultimately, the duo was joined by backing band TWRP in 2015, after which Wecht focused solely on keyboards for studio recordings.

=== Starbomb ===
Wecht's bandmate Dan Avidan had been the co-host of the Let's Play webseries Game Grumps since 2013. The same year, Wecht, Avidan, and Avidan's Game Grumps co-host Arin Hanson formed Starbomb. This new comedy band followed the humorous style of Ninja Sex Party, but focused on video game parodies. The project was officially revealed on December 3, 2013. It was quickly followed by a self-titled album on December 17. A second album, Player Select, was released on December 16, 2014, followed by Starbomb's third album, The TryForce, was released on April 19, 2019. Their fourth album "Starbomb Boom: Rise of Lyrics" was released on October 24, 2024.

=== Game Grumps ===
Wecht officially joined the Game Grumps team alongside Avidan and Hanson on November 5, 2015, becoming their new social media manager; he had occasionally appeared in their videos, mainly alongside Avidan to promote Ninja Sex Party. The team officially introduced him via a humorous sketch featured at the beginning of their BurgerTime video, "revealing" him to be the secret mastermind behind Game Grumps all along.

He is occasionally featured in some of their videos, mostly in Grumpcade and Steam Train, but also in several non-gameplay videos. He was the co-writer, composer and puppeteer on their promotional short I Burgie Burgie, and its sequel All Hail Burgie.

=== Others ===
Wecht appeared in an episode of Hot Pepper Game Review episode on September 16, 2013, "reviewing" the video game Dark under his Ninja Brian persona after eating a "very spicy" chili pepper; the episode is a joke, as Ninja Brian simply stares at the camera in silence for the entire episode, not blinking a single time in almost four minutes. Although his mouth is not visible, Wecht confirmed that he did actually eat the pepper while filming.

He also appeared in the fourth episode of the second season of Child Genius in 2014, having set questions about string theory for the participants, and reacting to their different answers.

He voiced the character of Quizzmaster Quinn in the video game Dream Daddy: A Dad Dating Simulator, a 2017 visual novel video game made by members of Game Grumps. He also appeared in two episodes of Good Game, a webseries starring Avidan and Hanson.

Alongside fellow Game Grumps member Barry Kramer and Rooster Teeth writer Miles Luna, Wecht co-wrote the episode "Grey vs. Gray" of Red vs. Blue.

In 2019, Wecht appeared in the music video for Canadian rapper Freddie Dredd's song "Cha Cha", playing a cameraman.

In 2020, Wecht began co-hosting the podcast Leighton Night with Brian Wecht alongside writer and game developer Leighton Gray.

Alongside Jim Roach, Wecht creates music for kids in a band called "Go Banana Go!" which has released three albums, Hi-ya! (2020), Dark Side of the Banana (2022), and Hot Fudge Saturday (2024).

Wecht released his first jazz album under the alias "Trey Magnifique" on November 10, 2023.

== Discography ==
=== Go Banana Go! ===
- Hi-ya! (2020)
- Dark Side of the Banana (2022)
- Hot Fudge Saturday (2024)

=== As Trey Magnifique ===
- Mature Situations (2023)

=== Ninja Sex Party ===
- NSFW (2011)
- Strawberries and Cream (2013)
- Attitude City (2015)
- Under the Covers (2016)
- Under the Covers, Vol. II (2017)
- Cool Patrol (2018)
- Under the Covers, Vol. III (2019)
- The Prophecy (2020)
- Level Up (2021)
- The Very, Very, Very, Very Classy Acoustic Album (2021)
- These Nuts (2024)
- Under the Covers, Vol. IV (2025)
- Zombie Handjob (2025)

=== Starbomb ===
- Starbomb (2013)
- Player Select (2014)
- The TryForce (2019)
- Starbomb Boom: Rise of Lyrics (2024)

== Personal life ==
Wecht is married to Rachel Wecht (née Bitney). The couple have a daughter, Audrey, who was born in 2014; nicknamed "Ninja Audrey", she appeared on several special Grumpcade episodes in 2017 with her father to celebrate Father's Day.

Wecht has a PhD and one of his inspirations for becoming a theoretical physicist was the television series Quantum Leap. He is strongly pro-vaccine, and is critical of the use of pseudoscience over scientifically-proven treatments for serious illnesses and diseases.

== Bibliography ==
=== Forewords ===
- Wecht, Dr. Brian (2017). Foreword. You Suck at Piano: A Piano Method for Adults. By Pierson, Dr. Joel. Mascot Books. ISBN 978-0-9993936-0-4.
