= TWRP (band) =

Canadian rock band

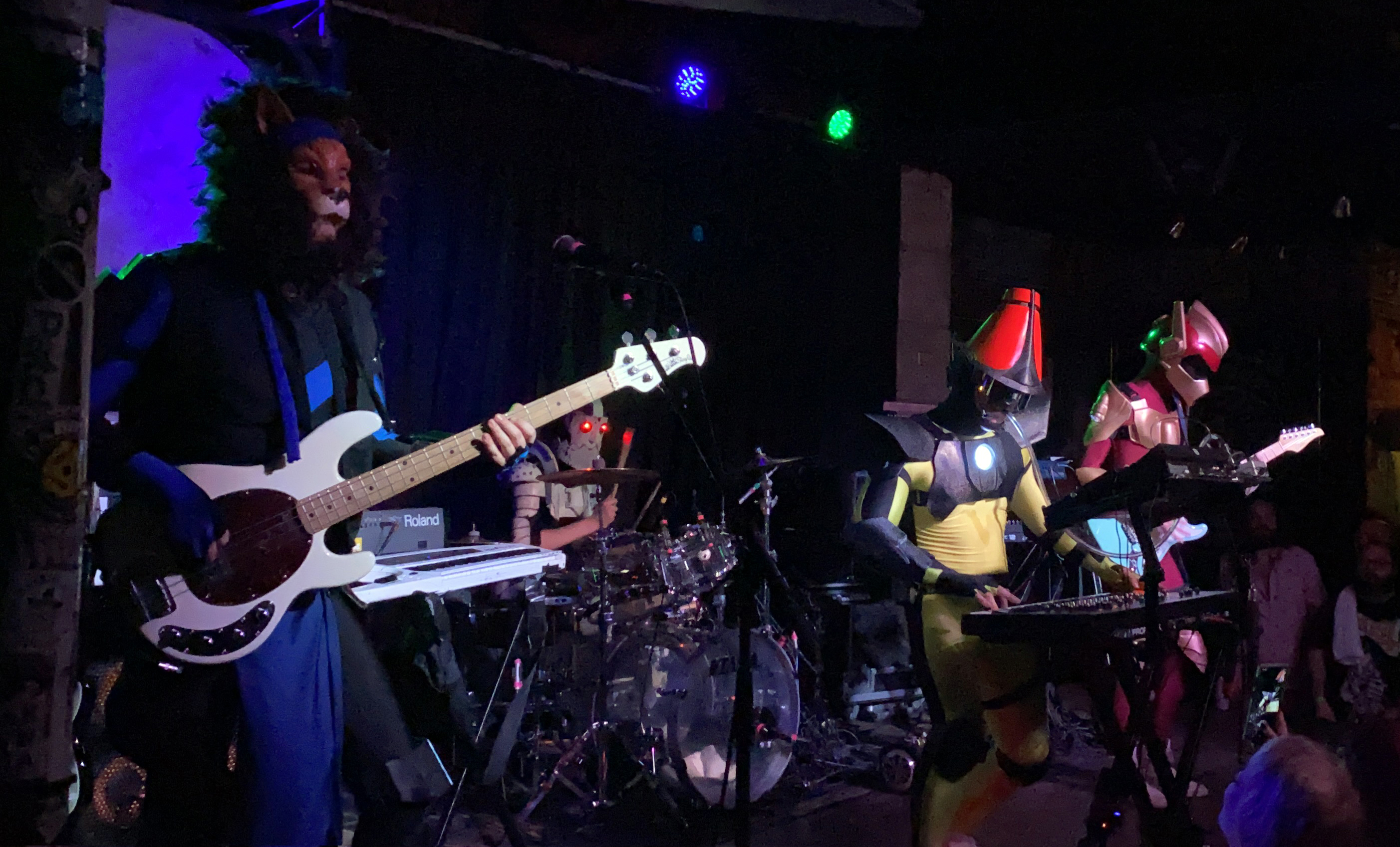
- TWRP performing in Tampa in March 2020. From left to right: Commander Meouch, Havve Hogan, Doctor Sung, and Lord Phobos.

Background information
- Also known as: Tupper Ware Remix Party
- Origin: Halifax, Nova Scotia, Canada
- Genres: Electronic rock; synth-pop; electro-funk; funk rock
- Years active: 2007–present
- Members: Doctor Sung; Havve Hogan; Lord Phobos; Commander Meouch
- Past members: Stone LaChismo; Bombustron; Atomicawk Startrotter
- Website: twrpband.com

TWRP (disemvoweling of twerp), formerly known as Tupper Ware Remix Party, is a Canadian rock band originally from Halifax, Nova Scotia. Founded in 2007, the band moved to Toronto in 2011 with a change in members and musical direction. Their current lineup consists of keyboardist and vocalist Doctor Sung, guitarist Lord Phobos, bassist Commander Meouch, and drummer Havve Hogan.

The band always performs in full costume, with their faces and real names unknown; they also have a fictional band history, involving Doctor Sung finding his bandmates through space and time. TWRP released their first album, Poised to Dominate, in 2010. It was followed by Together Through Time (2018), Return to Wherever (2019), Over the Top (2020), New & Improved (2021), Digital Nightmare (2024), and The Longest Weekend (2025). They have also released six EPs including The Device (2012) and Ladyworld (2017).

They are also known for their collaborations with Ninja Sex Party, having become their opening act and backing band in 2015 on both live performances and studio releases, starting with the album Under the Covers. They are also the backing band on The TryForce, the third album of Starbomb, another band featuring the members of Ninja Sex Party.

On 17 September 2018, TWRP appeared on Conan as the backing band for Ninja Sex Party, in a clean version of "Danny Don't You Know".

== Band members ==
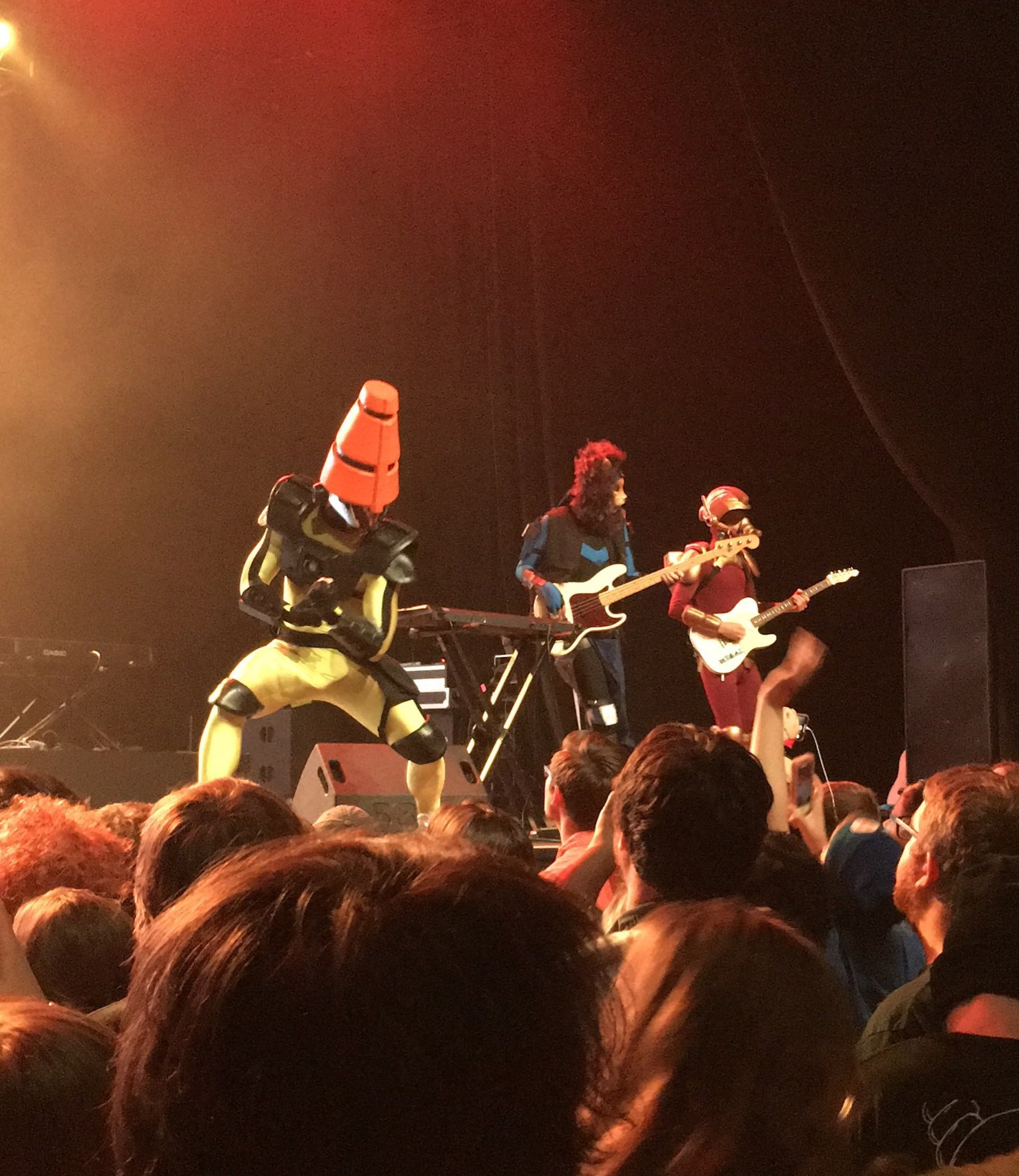
TWRP performing in Dallas in August 2018. From left to right: Doctor Sung, Commander Meouch and Lord Phobos.

Current

- Doctor Sung – talk box, vocoder, vocals, keyboards, synthesizers, keytar, percussion (2007–present)
- Havve Hogan – drums, electronic percussion (2007–present)
- Lord Phobos – electric guitar, acoustic guitar, pedal steel guitar, keyboards (2011–present)
- Commander Meouch – bass, keyboards, backing vocals (2012–present), vocoder (2012)

Former

- Stone LaChismo – bass (2007–2011)
- Bombustron – guitars, vocals, tambourine, electronic percussion, keyboard (2007–2011, 2011, 2012–2014)
- Atomicawk Startrotter – bass (2011–2012)

Timeline

== Discography ==
=== Studio albums ===
- Poised to Dominate (2010)
- Together Through Time (2018)
- Return to Wherever (2019)
- Over the Top (2020)
- New & Improved (2021)
- Digital Nightmare (2024)
- The Longest Weekend (2025)

=== Compilation albums ===
- Omnibus (2017)
- Welcome to TWRP (2018) (Note: Japanese exclusive release)
- Lil' Shiny Tunes Vol. 1 (2021) (Note: Bandcamp exclusive release)

=== EPs ===
- Sex Is a Machine That Likes to Dance (2007)
- The Device (2012)
- 2nite (2015)
- Believe in Your Dreams (2015)
- Guardians of the Zone (2016)
- Ladyworld (2017) (Note: Platforms which automatically determine whether a release is an album or EP, such as Spotify, may mistakenly list Ladyworld as an album because it contains 7 tracks.)
- Friends of the Blues (2023)

=== Singles ===
- "LazerHorse" (2011)
- "Only the Best" (2020)
- "Need Each Other" (2020)
- "Bright Blue Sky" (2021)
- "Found Your Love" (2021)
- "Polygon" (2021)
- "Eve Of The War" (2022)
- "Have You Heard?" (2023)
- "VHS" (2023)
- "Ladybug" (2023)
- "A Human's Touch" (2024)
- "My Big Day Off" (2025)
- "Critters" (2025)
- "Ain't Stoppin' For Nothin'" (2026)

=== As Ninja Sex Party's backing band ===
- Under the Covers (2016)
- Under the Covers, Vol. II (2017)
- Cool Patrol (2018)
- Under the Covers, Vol. III (2019)
- The Prophecy (2020)
- Level Up (2021)
- These Nuts (2024)
- Under The Covers, Vol. IV (2025)

=== As Starbomb's backing band ===
- The TryForce (2019)
- Leveled Up (2022)

=== Guest appearances ===
- Planet Booty – "Only If You Say Yes" (2021)

== Appearances in other media ==
- The band's song "The Perfect Product" from their album Together Through Time appears in the 2022 video game New Tales from the Borderlands as Episode 3's intro song.
- The band's song "The No Pants Dance" from their EP The Device appears in the 2017 video game Auto Age: Standoff
- In 2020, the band provided music for Chris Hadfield's educational web series Endeavor with Chris Hadfield as featured on the Elevate YouTube Channel
- In 2024, the band was featured on Tom Cardy's YouTube Channel, along with Montaigne, in the music video for the song "Online"
