= Jim Roach (producer) =

- Born: October 28, 1977 (age 48); Southern California
- Occupations: Songwriter, musician, producer
- Instruments: Guitar, bass, synthesizer, drums
- Member of: Shadow Academy
- Formerly of: The Snax

Jim Roach (born October 28, 1977) is an American multi-instrumentalist producer, songwriter, and owner of Red Parade Music Group, an indie record company based in Los Angeles, California.

== Life and career ==
Roach was born in Southern California, grew up in San Diego, and graduated from Westmont College in Santa Barbara, California with a Bachelor of Arts in Rhetoric and Communication Studies. While in college, he was heavily involved with music (despite dropping his music minor) and was in and out of several bands – most notably the Southern California punk rock group Tasty Snax, where he met and became bandmates with Dave "Phoenix" Farrell, who is now the bass player for the well-known multi-platinum band Linkin Park.

In 2002, after Tasty Snax disbanded, Roach was approached (by two of his classmates, Benjamin Holsteen and Eric Palmquist) to play guitar on a demo for their new band called The Rosewood Fall. The Rosewood Fall recorded their demo in late 2002 and in 2003, the band signed with Linkin Park's own label Machine Shop Recordings. In May 2004, they released their Demonstrate EP.

After being dropped from the label, Roach took a job as the touring drummer and music director for gold selling Geffen artist Hoku. Her success was widely recognized after her hit single "Perfect Day" made it in the feature film Legally Blonde. After years of touring with Hoku, he went on to produce her second album Listen Up.

In 2005, Roach was drafted by EMI/Re:Think Records to play lead guitar on the road and in the studio with the band This World Fair out of Minneapolis. He stayed with the band for a stint of touring and for the making of their album at Sonic Ranch Studios in Texas.

After several years of being on the road and in the studio as a drummer, bass player, guitar player, and songwriter for these major label groups, Roach resigned from his role as a working musician. In the fall of 2005, he shifted his attention to work exclusively in the studio with artists that were looking to hone their sound and songs.

In recent years, Roach's musical repertoire has also expanded to include film and television placement, having penned, produced, and mixed the end credit songs in films such as Golden Globe nominated Salmon Fishing in the Yemen, Tyler Perry's upcoming film Temptation: Confessions of a Marriage Counselor, and The Darkest Hour, starring Emile Hirsch; as well as multiple songs in films like The Internship starring Owen Wilson and Vince Vaughn, Disney’s PROM and TV shows on ABC, FOX, and CBS.

In 2012, Roach formed a joint-venture publishing company called Kung Fu Culture Publishing with music supervisor Dave Jordan and his company, Format Entertainment. Jordan and his team of supervisors have handled the music for films like the Iron Man trilogy, Transformers, The Bourne Identity, Captain America, Alvin and the Chipmunks, The Devil Wears Prada, both Sex and the City films, Arthur, and many more. In television Jim has written songs for shows like Jane by Design (ABC Family), Drop Dead Diva (Lifetime), Level Up (U.S. TV series) (Cartoon Network), Breaking In (TV series) (FOX), as well as several placements on VH1 and MTV.

As the owner of indie label Red Parade Music, Roach has signed artists such as Jesse Thomas, The Young Romans, Go Tell The Eskimo, Skyler Stonestreet, and Javier Dunn - artists who managed to place on the Billboard charts within their first release. Notably, the one-man label is permissive to its artists, focusing on aiding them while staying independent.

In 2015 he and comedian Kyle Dunnigan won an Emmy in the category of Outstanding Music & Lyrics for writing "Girl You Don't Need Makeup" which was written for comedian Amy Schumer and her show "Inside Amy Schumer."

Aside from writing and producing Jim is an executive producer for Apple Music / Beats1 where he developed shows for St. Vincent, Josh Homme of Queens Of The Stone Age, Haim, Ezra Koenig of Vampire Weekend, Corey Taylor of Slipknot and Chilly Gonzales.

Roach is the primary producer for the comedy bands Ninja Sex Party and Starbomb; and in 2022, he released a single alongside Dan Avidan who's from both those bands, as their new rock duo Shadow Academy. Their self-titled debut album was released the same year.

== Discography ==
Year	Project	Song	Credits
2011	PROM (Disney)	"Fill in the Blank"	Writer, producer
2011	The Darkest Hour	"The Uprising" (end credits track)	Writer, producer
2012	Salmon Fishing In The Yemen	"Where You Go" (end credits track)	Writer, producer
2013	Tyler Perryʼs The Marriage Counselor	"Guide You Home" (end credits track)	Writer, producer
2013	The Avengers (Extra Scenes DVD Feature)	“Eastbound and Down” Remake	Producer
2018	Ninja Sex Party – Cool Patrol	Full album	Writer, producer, guitarist, drummer, backing vocalist
2019	Starbomb – The TryForce	Full album	Producer
2019	Ninja Sex Party – Under the Covers, Vol. III	Full album	Producer
2021	Ninja Sex Party – The Very, Very, Very, Very Classy Acoustic Album	Full album	Producer, guitarist, vocals for "Danny Don't You Know"
2022	Shadow Academy – Shadow Academy	Full album	Assistant writer, producer
2023	Skyhill – Out In The Moonlight	Full album	Producer
2024	Starbomb – Starbomb Boom: Rise of Lyrics	Full album	Writer, producer
