= Backup band =

Band that accompanies a leading artist

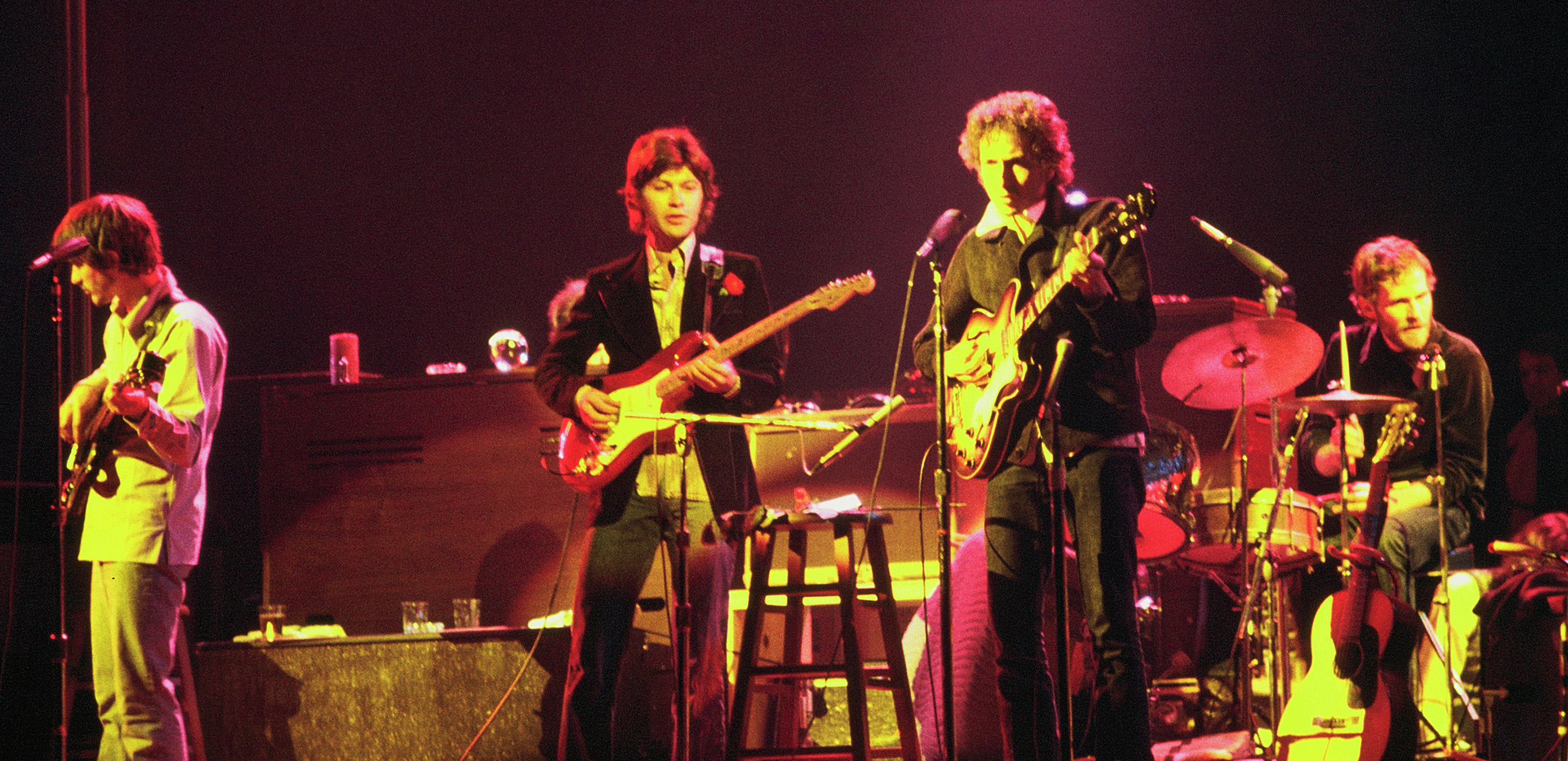
Bob Dylan and the Band performing in Chicago in 1974

A backup band or backing band is a musical ensemble that typically accompanies a single artist who is the featured performer. The situation may be a live performance or in a recording session, and the group may or may not have its own name, such as "The Heartbreakers" (the band of Tom Petty), or "Bob Wills and his Texas Playboys" in the 1930s. Often, backup bands contain sidemen who are skilled but not known to the public; these musicians may be replaced or substituted at any time without noticeable impact on the performance.

A number of cohesive stand-alone groups of musicians have emerged from the shadow of the starring celebrity (whom they are backing) to achieve a stature of their own. An example is the Eagles in 1971, emerging from being the backing band for Linda Ronstadt. Another example is The Band, a group who backed Bob Dylan on his world tour in 1966, his first tour with electric instruments.

A backing band may also be a cadre of elite studio musicians who serve as a house band for major studios. The same musicians may perform on records by a number of different artists. Examples are Stax Records' band, Booker T. & the M.G.'s; Detroit's The Funk Brothers; and Nashville's A-Team.

== Examples ==
Notable backing bands (with lead artist) include:

- Ace in the Hole (George Strait)
- All-Starr Band (Ringo Starr)
- Booker T. & the M.G.'s (Otis Redding)
- Bluesbreakers (John Mayall)
- Coral Reefer Band (Jimmy Buffett)
- Crazy Horse (Neil Young)
- Double Trouble (Stevie Ray Vaughan)
- Drifting Cowboys (Hank Williams)
- E Street Band (Bruce Springsteen)
- Flying Cunts of Chaos (Serj Tankian)
- Full Tilt Boogie Band (Janis Joplin)
- Joy Boys (Col Joye)
- Manassas (Stephen Stills)
- Miami Sound Machine (Gloria Estefan)
- Mink DeVille (Willy Deville)
- Neverland Express (Meat Loaf)
- New Bohemians (Edie Brickell)
- Parliament Funkadelic (George Clinton)
- Scarlet Fever (CeeLo Green)
- Spearhead (Michael Franti)
- The Aces (Desmond Dekker)
- The Attractions (Elvis Costello)
- The Bad Seeds (Nick Cave)
- The Belmonts (Dion DiMucci)
- The Blackhearts (Joan Jett)
- The Blockheads (Ian Dury)
- The Bluebelles (Patti LaBelle)
- The Cardinals (Ryan Adams)
- The Crickets (Buddy Holly)
- The Dakotas (Billy J. Kramer)
- The Delaware Destroyers (George Thorogood)
- The Detroit Wheels (Mitch Ryder)
- The First National Band (Michael Nesmith)
- The Flecktones (Bela Fleck)
- The Foggy Mountain Boys (Flatt & Scruggs)
- The Four Seasons (Frankie Valli)
- The Free Nationals (Anderson .Paak)
- The Funky Bunch (Marky Mark)
- The Glitter Band (Gary Glitter)
- The Heartbreakers (Tom Petty)
- The Hooligans (Bruno Mars)
- The Impressions (Curtis Mayfield)
- The J.B.'s (James Brown)
- The Jordanaires (Elvis Presley)
- The Magic Band (Captain Beefheart)
- The Maytals (Toots Hibbert)
- The Miracles (Smokey Robinson)
- The Modern Lovers (Jonathan Richman)
- The Mothers of Invention (Frank Zappa)
- The New Power Generation (Prince)
- The News (Huey Lewis)
- The Nice (P.P. Arnold)
- Nighthawks Orchestra (Vince Giordano)
- The Pacemakers (Gerry Marsden)
- The Pips (Gladys Knight)
- The Raelettes (Ray Charles)
- The Raiders (Paul Revere)
- The Range (Bruce Hornsby)
- The Revolution (Prince)
- The Rides (Stephen Stills)
- The Rumour (Graham Parker)
- The Scene (Selena Gomez)
- The Section (Jackson Browne, James Taylor)
- The SFA (Jonathan Davis)
- The Shadows (Cliff Richard)
- The Shondells (Tommy James)
- The Silver Bullet Band (Bob Seger)
- The Sixers (Stephen Kellogg)
- The Spiders from Mars (David Bowie)
- The Steep Canyon Rangers (Steve Martin)
- The Stooges (Iggy Pop)
- The Strangers (Merle Haggard)
- The Stray Gators (Neil Young)
- The Sunshine Band (Harry Wayne "KC" Casey)
- The Supremes (Diana Ross)
- The Tennessee Three (Johnny Cash)
- The Texas Playboys (Bob Wills)
- The Tremeloes (Brian Poole)
- The Union Gap (Gary Puckett)
- The Vandellas (Martha Reeves)
- The Voidoids (Richard Hell)
- The Wailers (Bob Marley)
- The Waves (Katrina Leskanich)
- TWRP (Ninja Sex Party, Starbomb)
- Twisted Brown Trucker (Kid Rock)
- Union Station (Alison Krauss)
- Wings (Paul McCartney)
