= Hex Heroes =

- Developer: Prismatic Games
- Designer: Mario Castañeda
- Composer: Grant Kirkhope
- Platforms: Microsoft Windows, macOS, Linux
- Genres: Party, real-time strategy
- Modes: Single-player, multiplayer

Hex Heroes is an unreleased party, real-time strategy game. Originally in development for Wii U since 2014, it failed to release before the console's eShop closed in March 2023. The game remains unfinished, with plans to release on Microsoft Windows, macOS and Linux. It is ostensibly being developed by Prismatic Games, and designed by Mario Castañeda, who previously co-created The Bridge. The game has received no updates since September 2021, leading to speculation that it is in development hell or has been cancelled.

== Gameplay ==
The Wii U version would have supported up to five players, one using the Wii U GamePad and four using Wii Remotes, who harvest resources, build structures, fend off enemies, and explore territories. The player with the GamePad manages resources and teammates, makes decisions, and surveys the land from a view. Players can choose from different classes, each playing a unique role.

== Characters ==
The game features a number of characters from various franchises. Each character serves as a swap for each in-game class but has their own unique animations and personalities.

Character	Series
Alicia	Heart Forth, Alicia
Zoya	Trine
Egoraptor	Game Grumps
Danny	Game Grumps
Ross & Orph	Game Grumps
Juan	Guacamelee!
Max	Mutant Mudds
Shovel Knight	Shovel Knight
Rusty	SteamWorld Dig
Lady Faye IV	Rogue Legacy
Subject W	Paradise Lost: First Contact
Cyrus	Wizorb
The Drifter	Hyper Light Drifter
Turing	Read Only Memories
Hat Kid	A Hat in Time

== Development ==
The idea came out from a game jam. The developers had reached out to Nintendo through its indie self-publishing program. A project was created on Kickstarter to help raise $80,000 to develop the game. The developers had got in touch with Grant Kirkhope and after a couple of months brought him on board. Cameo characters, which the developers wanted to include but were unable to, were Beck, Shantae, Raz, and Steve.

In April 2014, the game was successfully funded, having reached $86,000, though it hadn't reached any of its stretch goals.

Hex Heroes was displayed at the 2015 GX3 convention held in December, and was well-received, landing Prismatic an investor. The game was displayed at the 2016 GDC Play conference held in March, and was named as an honorable mention for the Best in Play award.

In 2018, Nintendo denied to Prismatic access to their development kit to the Switch. Nintendo closed the 3DS and Wii U eShop in March 2023, preventing the game from being released digitally. The game is currently incomplete and there is no indication that it will be completed.

== Marketing ==
To help promote the game, the game's designer Mario Castañeda narrated an episode of Did You Know Gaming? covering the Super Nintendo Entertainment System.
