= Dance Showdown =

- Genre: Dance competition
- Created by: DanceOn
- Starring: Dominic Sandoval
- Country of origin: United States
- Original language: English
- No. of seasons: 4
- No. of episodes: 27

Original release
- Network: YouTube
- Release: April 5, 2012 – December 22, 2015

D-trix Presents Dance Showdown (formerly known as Dance Showdown Presented by D-trix) is a dance competition web-series created by DanceOn, a YouTube-funded channel created by Amanda Taylor. DanceOn broadcasts the series on YouTube. The series premiered on April 5, 2012.

== Judges ==
=== Season 2 ===
- Laurieann Gibson, a VMA-winning choreographer,
- Joey Fatone, former member of 'N Sync, and runner-up on the fourth season of the American version of Dancing with the Stars

with

- Dave Days (First Show), a YouTube celebrity and musician
- Ryan Higa (Second Show), a YouTube celebrity known for the former most subscribed YouTube channel, nigahiga
- Shane Dawson (Third Show), a YouTube celebrity known for his channel, ShaneDawsonTV

=== Season 3 ===
- Joey Fatone, former member of 'N Sync, and runner-up on the fourth season of the American version of Dancing with the Stars.
- Laurieann Gibson, a VMA-winning choreographer.
- Kassem Gharaibeh, a YouTube celebrity, better known by his stage name, KassemG

=== Season 4 ===
- Laurieann Gibson, a VMA-winning choreographer.
- Steve Kardynal, a YouTube celebrity and comedian and finalist of the third season of DanceShowdown,
- Dominic Sandoval, host of DanceShowdown, Dancer, YouTube Star named D-Trix, season 3 contestant and later all star of So You Think You Can Dance, and winner of seasons 3 and 8 of America's Best Dance Crew along with Quest Crew

== Season 1 ==
The first season premiered on April 5, 2012 and for ten episodes until May 31, 2012. For the first season the series was named Dance Showdown Presented by D-trix. Dominic Sandoval, better known as D-trix was the host of the first season. The winner, WoodysGamertag was awarded $25,000.

Contestants:

- xJawz (Sam Betesh)
- Tay Zonday
- Good Neighbor
- Itskingsleybitch
- Hannah Hart
- Obama Girl (Amber Lee Ettinger)
- Hot For Words (Marina Orlova)
- JLovesMac1
- SeaNanners (Adam Montoya)
- Lana McKissack
- WhatsUpElle (Elle Walker)
- WoodysGamertag (Matthew Woodworth)

Professional Dancers:

- Lauren Froderman
- Bryan Tanaka
- Ian Eastwood
- Kherington Payne

== Season 2 ==
The second season premiered on October 5, 2012. The judges featured for the second season included Joey Fatone, Ryan Higa, Shane Dawson, Dave Days, Laurieann Gibson. Dominic Sandoval returned as the host of the series for the second season. The winner, Jesse Wellens from PrankvsPrank, was awarded $100,000 after winning the Viewer's Vote and the Judge's Pick.

Contestants:

- Alphacat (Iman Crosson)
- Andrew Garcia
- Brittani Louise Taylor
- Chester See
- ChimneySwift11
- ExoticJess
- Meghan Rosette
- MissHannahMinx (Hannah Wagner)
- ONLYUSEmeBLADE (Brian Risso)
- PrankvsPrank (Jesse Wellens)
- StilaBabe09 (Meredith Foster)
- Screen Team Show

Professional Dancers:

- Lauren Froderman
- Mike Song
- Brinn Nicole
- Anze Skrube

== Season 3 ==
On October 21, 2013, a teaser for the third season was released. Fatone and Gibson returned as judges, but KassemG was presented as a new third judge. DanceOn partnered with Coca-Cola and the (RED) Campaign, to create a special episode of Dance Showdown. The winner, Egoraptor, was awarded $50,000 after winning the Viewer's Vote and the Judge's Pick.

Contestants:

- Lindsey Stirling
- MysteryGuitarMan (Joe Penna)
- Sam Pepper and Lancifer
- Steve Kardynal
- Strawburry17 (Meghan Camarena)
- Egoraptor (Arin Hanson)
- GlamLifeGuru (Tati Westbrook)
- Macbby11 (Alisha Marie)

Professional Dancers:

- Anze Skrube
- Emily Sasson
- Anisha Gibs
- Brinn Nicole
- Anthony Lee
- Maxine Hupy
- Matt Steffanina
- David Moore

== Season 4 ==
On September 17, 2015, a teaser trailer for Season 4 was released. Season 4 was won by Vine sensation, Gabbie Hanna and her partner Matt Steffanina. The final episode of Dance Showdown was published on December 22, 2015.

Contestants:

- AJ Rafael
- Jorge Narvaez
- Arika Sato
- Jackie Hernandez
- Gabbie Hanna
- Brian Brushwood

Professional Dancers:

- Bryan Tanaka
- Ian Eastwood
- Kherington Payne
- Lauren Froderman, winner of the seventh season of So You Think You Can Dance. Froderman is also the only returning professional dancer from the previous season.
- Brinn Nicole, a dancer on Snoop Dogg's world tour.
- Anže Škrube, the choreographer of the music video for No One and a nine-time gold medalist at the Slovenian National Championship
- Mike Song, finalist on America's Best Dance Crew
- Maxine Hupy
- Matt Steffanina
