= JonTron =

American YouTube personality (born 1990)

- Born: Jonathan Aryan Jafari; March 24, 1990 (age 36); Rancho Palos Verdes, California, U.S.
- Occupation: YouTuber
- Spouse: Charlotte Claw (m. 2019)
- Children: 1

YouTube information
- Channels: JonTronShow; JonTronLoL; JonTronStarcraft
- Years active: 2010–present
- Genres: Gaming; comedy; surreal comedy
- Subscribers: 6.36 million
- Views: 1.43 billion
- Last updated: October 18, 2026

Jonathan Aryan Jafari (born March 24, 1990), better known as JonTron, is an American YouTuber and comedian. He created the eponymous YouTube web series JonTron, where he reviews and parodies video games, films and other media.

Jafari is the co-creator and former co-host of the Let's Play webseries Game Grumps, and co-created the video game entertainment website Normal Boots. As of August 2026, his YouTube channel JonTronShow has 6.37 million subscribers and 1.43 billion views.

== Early life ==
Jafari was born in Rancho Palos Verdes, California, on March 24, 1990, to Afshin and Irene Jafari. His father is of Iranian descent and his mother is of Hungarian descent. He attended Palos Verdes Peninsula High School from 2004 to 2008.

== Career ==
=== Early career ===
Jafari created a Newgrounds account under the name "BirdmanXZ6" in 2003, and uploaded five animations depicting anthropomorphic onions. In 2006, he made a YouTube account under the same name. Jafari uploaded videos on ScrewAttack.com in 2010, reviewing games such as GoldenEye 007.

=== JonTron ===
On August 31, 2010, Jafari created a YouTube channel called JonTronShow. He stated that he chose the name JonTron because it was "reminiscent of technology" and that the show was originally going to be called JonTron 2.0. He uploaded a two-part review of the Nintendo 64 version of the game Daikatana, the first installment in his JonTron series. In each episode of JonTron, Jafari reviews singular games, as well as games of a particular theme, franchise, or genre. He is usually accompanied by his green-cheeked parakeet, Jacques, who speaks with a robotic voice. Jafari usually incorporates elements of sketch comedy into these episodes, to display his reactions to the video game that he is reviewing. According to Jafari, in an episode of the Internet gaming webseries Game Grumps, Jacques was originally to speak in a stereotypical jive voice, with Jafari's mouth being super-imposed onto the character's face, rather than his eyes glowing red whenever he talked. In his early days, he reviewed video games, showing fondness for Nintendo games, as well as those developed by British game developer Rare, particularly their works from the 1990s, although expressing highly critical views surrounding their later titles, such as Star Fox Adventures and Banjo-Kazooie: Nuts & Bolts. Jafari has reviewed numerous video game adaptations of popular franchises, such as Hercules, Barbie, Home Alone, Star Wars and Conan the Barbarian, as well as relatively unknown games for the NES like Monster Party and Takeshi's Challenge. He has also reviewed various unlicensed games, particularly based on the Pokémon franchise, as well as the 1997 film Titanic and Disney films. In the latter, he observed China as being "farther away from U.S. jurisdiction, and much better at Disney bootlegging" and also remarked on unofficial online games based on the company's films. Jafari occasionally uploads skits, as well as film reviews. For his Halloween Specials, he reviewed the anthology horror television series Goosebumps and Are You Afraid of the Dark?.

According to Jafari, in an episode of Game Grumps, JonTron began achieving notability after a post on Reddit featuring Jafari's review of the Super Nintendo Entertainment System game DinoCity reached #1 on the website. In 2011, Jafari created two now-defunct spin-off Let's Play channels, "JonTronStarcraft" and "JonTronLoL", each hosting a few videos of Jafari's gameplay in real-time strategy game StarCraft and MOBA game League of Legends respectively. Both channels have fewer than 25,000 subscribers. JonTronShow reached 1 million subscribers in May 2014. In 2013, Paul Tamburro of CraveOnline said: "Mixing a large dollop of offbeat humour with a light sprinkle of insightful commentary, JonTron's reviews of games of old have inspired many imitators, but none have proven to be more hilarious." Time magazine listed JonTron as 2015's seventh most searched Internet meme on Google.

In May 2015, Jafari released a spin-off web series on his YouTube channel titled JonTron's StarCade, in which he reviews games based on the Star Wars franchise. The webseries included cameos from numerous other Internet personalities and actors, such as Egoraptor, Markiplier, Nathan Barnatt, Ross O'Donovan, and Kyle Hebert. The series was produced by Maker Studios, a subsidiary of The Walt Disney Company, and concluded in December 2015, after nine episodes.

Jafari occasionally uploads videos in which he comments on matters that he finds important, which are usually related to gaming. This occurred most recently in 2016, with a video made in response to Blizzard Entertainment shutting down private servers of the massively multiplayer online role-playing game World of Warcraft. Jafari mostly criticized the shutdown of one of the most popular private servers, Nostalrius, which was a copy of the 1.12 version of the game. Jafari's video helped to raise awareness on this subject, and lead to thousands of signatures on a Change.org petition.

Throughout 2019 and 2020, Jafari has continued to broaden the range of media covered on his show, instead of solely traditional video games. Notable examples of topics are Flex Tape, rapper Soulja Boy's SouljaGame console, actress Gwyneth Paltrow's company Goop and its web series The Goop Lab, actor Dan Aykroyd's Crystal Head Vodka brand, and the 2007 TV series Kid Nation.

JonTron is largely credited with public awareness of Flex Tape and Phil Swift, and its transformation into an Internet meme. The original video on the subject has received over 72 million views as of June 2024, and the sequel has over 29 million, and features a cameo from Swift himself.

=== NormalBoots ===
NormalBoots was created in late 2010 by Screw Attack colleagues Jafari and Austin "PeanutButterGamer" Hargrave to act as a hub where Jafari and Hargrave could post content and receive advertisement revenue. Soon after its creation, Indie Games Searchlight and Cold Morning joined the group. In June 2011, the YouTube channel Continue? joined, while in August of the same year, Underbelly joined. In October 2011, Cold Morning left, and in June 2012, Underbelly left. However shortly after each departure new YouTubers joined, with The Completionist joining in November 2011, and Did You Know Gaming?, joining in July 2012. The site was closed down in November 2012, as Google AdSense offered better revenue options for the content creators.

NormalBoots was relaunched on January 24, 2014, so that the members could upload videos that weren't "YouTube-friendly". Jafari alongside the remaining members of NormalBoots, apart from Indie Games Searchlight, came back, with two new YouTubers joining, ProJared and Satchell Drakes. On May 17, 2017, the group announced that they were going to reconnect due to the creators drifting apart. A new YouTube channel was created to unite the creators. During this time Jafari decided to leave to focus on his own channel but would still remain as a founding member.

=== Game Grumps ===
Jafari met animator Arin "Egoraptor" Hanson, of whom he had been a fan since the early 2000s, when the latter messaged him on YouTube shortly after his review of DinoCity grew popular. The two eventually became close friends, and in July 2012, Jafari and Hanson announced they would be starting a Let's Play series titled Game Grumps through videos on both their channels. On July 18 of the same year, Jafari and Hanson uploaded their first serials of Game Grumps: Kirby Super Star, Mega Man 7 and The Legend of Zelda: A Link to the Past. On the Game Grumps channel, Jafari and Hanson played games together, typically ones that were retro or nostalgic in style, along with comedic commentary.

On June 25, 2013, Jafari left Game Grumps in order to focus on JonTron, and was replaced by Ninja Sex Party singer Dan Avidan on the same day. Some fans criticized the sudden and unexpected announcement, as well as the channel announcing the debut of the spin-off series Steam Train on the same day that Jafari's departure was disclosed.

=== Collaborations ===
Jafari has collaborated with multiple YouTube channels, including Ethan and Hila Klein's channel h3h3Productions. From October 2015 to August 2016, Hila Klein was a producer for JonTron. He has made an appearance on James Rolfe's Let's Play series James & Mike Mondays. He made a cameo appearance in Angry Video Game Adventures. Jafari was a featured vocalist in an episode of The Gregory Brothers' viral webseries Songify the News. At the same time, The Gregory Brothers remixed Jafari's review of the bootlegged game, Titenic, and it was released on iTunes.

Jafari has done voice-over work for Did You Know Gaming?, covering episodes on The Legend of Zelda, Banjo-Kazooie, Donkey Kong, Pokémon, Pikmin, Animal Crossing, Dragon Quest, Sonic Boom: Rise of Lyric, and games of Disney franchises. He has covered the development of Star Wars for their spin-off series Did You Know Movies? on fellow YouTube channel, The Film Theorists.

In 2013, before his departure from Game Grumps, Jafari and Hanson appeared in a promotional video produced by Polaris for the Warner Bros. movie Pacific Rim. Around the same time, Jafari appeared in Ninja Sex Party's music video for "Let's Get This Terrible Party Started", which was directed by Hanson. To promote the 2013 World Series, Jafari appeared in an a cappella cover of "Take Me Out to the Ball Game", produced by PepsiCo and musician Mike Tompkins, and uploaded to Maker Studios' Maker Music channel.

In November 2016, Jafari released an album called Love Is Like Drugs with The Gregory Brothers, which reached number two on the Billboard chart of comedy albums of the week of November 26. Later, on December 2, 2018, he collaborated with pitchman Phil Swift in the video "Flex Tape II: The Flexening".

In October 2026, Jafari together with YouTuber Internet Historian started co-hosting a gaming channel named Consolation Guys which uploads weekly.

=== Other work ===
Jafari played Banjo-Kazooie in June 2014 on a Twitch stream, to collect donations for Teach For America's GoFundMe campaign. Jafari stated that if the $25,000 proposed goal was hit, he would reprise a cover of Katy Perry's song "Firework" originally recorded for his 2011 review of DinoCity. The full version of the cover was uploaded to Jafari's YouTube channel on February 14, 2016.

In 2016, Jafari was featured as a character alongside other NormalBoots collaborators in the dating sim and visual novel Asagao Academy.

Jafari has provided voice-over work for A Hat in Time, a video game by Gears for Breakfast.

== Political views ==
=== Partisanship ===
In an interview with Breitbart News, Jafari stated that he voted for Barack Obama both times, and that he supported Bernie Sanders in the 2016 primaries, but has said that he does not identify as conservative or liberal, preferring instead to decide on a case-by-case basis.

=== 2017 comments ===
Jafari discussed politics on a Carl Benjamin livestream on January 27, 2017. On March 12, Jafari posted a tweet defending comments made by Iowa representative Steve King on United States' immigration policy: "We can't restore our civilization with somebody else's babies." Jafari later appeared on a Destiny livestream to speak further on topics of race, stating that "nobody wants to become a minority in their own country" and claiming that there are "large swathes of [American residents of Mexican descent] who want to break parts of America off back into Mexico." He also claimed to have seen statistics that wealthy black people commit more crimes than poor white people, and asked rhetorically whether European colonization of Africa was a good thing.

Shortly afterwards, many outlets criticized his statements. The Southern Poverty Law Center and Anti-Defamation League described Jafari's claim about Mexican-Americans as a racist myth and conspiracy theory. There was also backlash within his fanbase, with partners noting a loss of subscribers. Jafari posted a statement on YouTube on March 19, addressing some of his controversial arguments from the stream.

In response to the controversy, a launch day update to the April 2017 game Yooka-Laylee replaced Jafari's voice parts. Jafari's voice was still used in A Hat in Time, which resulted in mixed reactions and some saying they would refuse to purchase the game if he was included. On May 18, 2017, NormalBoots announced that Jafari would no longer be an active member by "mutual understanding", though he had not been kicked out and would still be considered an honored founder.

In November 2017, Jafari appeared on a podcast with h3h3Productions where he explained about his statements; he stated that he should not have gone into such subjects without any prior preparation, and that while he did not hold any racist views, he wishes people could "[talk] about these things without witch hunting each other".

== Personal life ==
In July 2013, coinciding with Jafari's departure from Game Grumps, he announced that he had moved from Los Angeles to New York City.

Jafari is married to Charlotte Claw; the ceremony took place on October 23, 2019. On Christmas Day in 2024, the two announced that they were expecting a child together. On April 16, 2025, their son William Albert Jafari was born.

== Filmography ==
=== Web series ===
Year	Title	Role	Notes
2010–present	JonTron	Himself	Official YouTube channel
2012–13	Game Grumps	Himself	636 episodes; co-host; also creator and theme music composer
2012–13	TOME: Terrain of Magical Expertise	Sniperwheel	3 episodes
2012–16	Did You Know Gaming?	Himself	12 episodes
2014	With Lyrics	Wii Shop Channel customer	1 episode
2014	Nostalgia Critic	Himself	4 episodes; Nostalgiaween intro
2015	Songify the News	Himself	Episode 8: Of Murder & Catfish
2015	Did You Know Movies?	Himself	Episode: Star Wars On-Set Secrets
2015–16	Cinemassacre	Himself	4 episodes
2016	Smart Guys	Guy	Episode 3: "Recruitment"
2018	HowToBasic	Himself	Episode: "Face Reveal"
2018	OneyPlays	Himself	Episode: "Oney Plays Newgrounds Games with JonTron"

=== Video games ===
Year	Title	Role	Notes	Ref.
2016	Asagao Academy: Normal Boots Club	Jon		
2017	Yooka-Laylee	Space Outhouse	Replaced with another voice in day 1 patch.	
2017	A Hat in Time	Receptionist Bird		

=== Film ===
Year	Title	Role	Notes
2016	2.0	Injured Spec Op (voice)	Television film

== See also ==
- List of YouTube personalities
