= Ross O'Donovan =

Australian animator and Internet personality (born 1987)

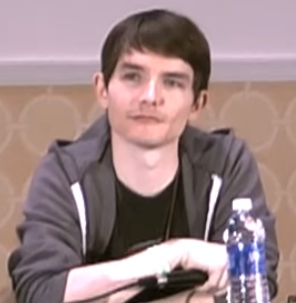
- O'Donovan at MAGFest in 2015
- Born: Ross Kenry O'Donovan; 17 June 1987 (age 39); Perth, Western Australia
- Occupations: Animator; cartoonist; voice actor; Internet personality
- Spouse: Holly Conrad (m. 2012; div. 2018)

YouTube information
- Channels: RubberNinja; RubberRoss
- Years active: 2004–present
- Genres: Animation; comedy; gaming
- Subscribers: 2.3 million (combined): 1.75 million (RubberRoss); 564 thousand (RubberNinja)
- Views: 267.3 million (combined): 243.1 million (RubberRoss); 24.16 million (RubberNinja)
- Last updated: 12 December 2025

Ross Kenry O'Donovan (born 17 June 1987), also known as RubberNinja and RubberRoss, is an Australian animator, voice actor, director, writer, and internet personality. He is the creator and co-writer of the Glitch Productions web series Gameoverse. He is known for his solo work as a streamer on Twitch, as well as his YouTube and Newgrounds cartoons and animations. He co-hosted the internet show Steam Train, a spin-off of YouTube Let's Play series Game Grumps.

== Early life ==
O'Donovan was born on 17 June 1987 in Perth, Western Australia to Irish Catholic parents. His father, Donough is a GP and a traditional Irish music guitarist who was born in Dublin. His sister, Rebecca is a journalist in Australia, and is married to Australian cricketer Shaun Marsh. O'Donovan attended Corpus Christi College. After graduating from college, he studied and instructed animation at the Film and Television Institute of Western Australia in Fremantle.

== Career ==
O'Donovan began his career by posting animated shorts to Newgrounds under the name "RubberNinja". He would later establish a YouTube channel and begin uploading content there. His best known work was the series Gamer Tonight, which was produced for the ABC2 video game-based program Good Game. The series featured a fictitious talk show whose host, voiced by frequent-collaborator Arin Hanson, would interview various types of gamers.

In August 2014, O'Donovan uploaded a video expressing his concerns with animation videos on YouTube. Discussing the changes made to YouTube's algorithms, he stated that the website was now accommodating live-action videos over animated videos due to the algorithm's emphasis on retention time and upload frequencies which would impede animation channels.

=== Game Grumps ===
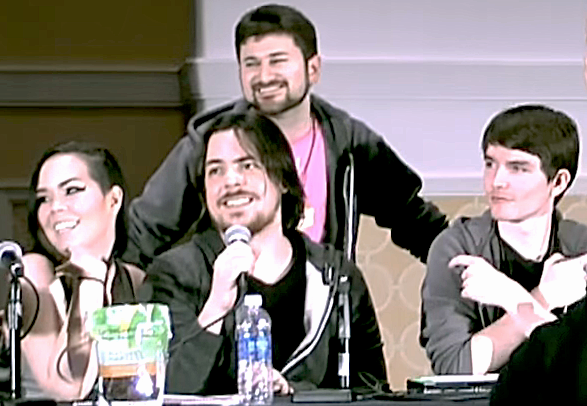
O'Donovan (right) with fellow Game Grump members Suzy Berhow (left), Arin Hanson (bottom center), and Barry Kramer (top center) in 2015

In 2013, after Jon Jafari's departure from the YouTube Let's Play series Game Grumps, co-host Arin Hanson, launched a second show on the Game Grumps platform. Originally conceptualized by O'Donovan, the show Steam Train had O'Donovan joined by Ninja Sex Party vocalist Dan Avidan, where both would play PC games (the title referencing online retailer Steam).

In June 2015, O'Donovan launched a 5-episode miniseries on the Game Grumps channel called Guild Grumps. O'Donovan mentored 4 members of the Game Grumps crew in a 5-day race to advance from Level 90 to Level 100 in the Warlords of Draenor expansion of World of Warcraft.

=== After Game Grumps ===
In 2020, O'Donovan left Game Grumps on good terms, to prioritize making his own content. He has returned on multiple occasions as a guest and made a brief cameo in a video commemorating the series' 10th anniversary. His new YouTube channel, RubberRoss, reached over 1 million subscribers in 2022.

In August 2020, O'Donovan was the target of a controversial advertising campaign by Burger King and the ad agency Ogilvy. The companies used a feature on Twitch that allows viewers to donate small amounts of money in order to broadcast unsolicited advertisements. Clips from these streams were later used in a video advertisement. O'Donovan made a series of tweets criticizing the campaign, calling the practice "scummy as hell". The tweets, as well as additional statements from O'Donovan, were used in articles by BBC, Kotaku, and PC Gamer while reporting on the issue.

Since September 2021, O'Donovan's YouTube videos have primarily consisted of him and other artists collaborating within the online Gartic Phone game.

In January 2026, Australian studio Glitch Productions announced that it partnered with O'Donovan and Arin Hanson for the release of Gameoverse, a reboot of a 2009 webseries by O'Donovan. The pilot episode released in May on Glitch Productions's YouTube channel.

== Personal life ==
On 29 September 2012, O'Donovan married Holly Conrad, a cosplayer, propmaker, and special effects artist who was featured in Comic-Con Episode IV: A Fan's Hope and Heroes of Cosplay. On 19 September 2018, Conrad and O'Donovan announced on their respective Twitter pages that they would be splitting up amicably, citing Conrad's decision to move to Seattle.

On 9 April 2021, O’Donovan announced on Twitter that his mother had died due to lung cancer.

== Philanthropy ==
As of 2015, O'Donovan and Game Grumps have raised over $70,000 by hosting charity livestreams on Twitch.

== Awards and nominations ==
Year	Ceremony	Category	Result	Ref.
2022	The Streamer Awards	Best Art Streamer	Nominated	
2023	The Streamer Awards	Best Creative Arts Streamer	Won	

== Filmography ==
=== Web series ===
Year	Title	Role	Notes
2009	There Will Be Brawl	Excitebike Hooligan	Episode: "Pandora's Box"
2012–2013	PeanutButterGamer's Hardcore Series	Himself	7 episodes
2013–2021	Game Grumps	Himself (voice)	Co-host of Steam Train and Doodle Doods
2015	Did You Know Gaming?	Himself (voice)	Episode: "Super Mario Maker"
2015	JonTron's StarCade	Ross Leader	2 episodes
2015–2016	Red vs. Blue	Ross/Deuce (voice)	2 episodes
2019	Meta Runner	Announcer (Voice)	Episode: "One Shot"
2021	Scott the Woz	Himself	Episode: Borderline Forever
2026–present	Gameoverse	Various	Reboot of the 2009-2010 webseries of the same name. Voice; Also creator, co-writer, director, executive producer, visual development, character designer, and rough animator

=== Video games ===
Year	Title	Role
2017	Paradigm	Double Denim Bridge Troll
2017	Pinstripe	Mr. Dicky
2019	River City Girls	Shinji
2019	Monster Prom	Tate/Leonard
2019	Shantae and the Seven Sirens	Bolo
2020	Monster Prom 2: Monster Camp	Gerard/Al/Tubular Eddy, the Anti-Gambling Aardvark
Unreleased	Hex Heroes	Himself

=== Music videos ===
Year	Title	Artist	Notes
2014	"Why I Cry"	Ninja Sex Party	
2014	"Peppermint Creams"	Ninja Sex Party	
2015	"Minecraft is for Everyone"	Starbomb	Lead animator
2016	"6969"	Ninja Sex Party	
2021	"The Mystic Crystal"	Ninja Sex Party	
