= Death Rally =

1996 video game

- Developers: Remedy Entertainment; Cornfox & Brothers (remake); Mountain Sheep (remake)
- Publishers: Apogee Software (MS-DOS); Remedy Entertainment
- Composer: Jonne Valtonen
- Series: Death Rally
- Platforms: MS-DOS, Microsoft Windows, iOS, Android, Fire OS
- Release: MS-DOS; 7 September 1996; Microsoft Windows; 20 October 2009; iOS (remake); 31 March 2011; Android (remake); 13 April 2012; Microsoft Windows (remake); 3 August 2012; Fire OS (remake); 3 September 2012
- Genres: Vehicular combat, racing
- Modes: Single player, multiplayer

Death Rally is a vehicular combat racing video game developed by Remedy Entertainment, published by Apogee Software and distributed by GT Interactive. Originally known as HiSpeed during development, it was released on 7 September 1996 for MS-DOS. In the game, the player starts with $495 and a weak car named Vagabond (based on the VW Beetle), and must compete in deadly races where all cars are armed (although a game without guns is an option). The player wins money by finishing in front positions, collecting money bonuses during the race, fulfilling missions and destroying other cars. The ultimate goal of the game is defeating the "Adversary", the undisputed king of Death Rally, in a one-on-one race.

In October 2009, Remedy updated Death Rally with compatibility for Microsoft Windows and re-released the game as freeware. A remake of the game was developed by Remedy in cooperation with Mountain Sheep and Cornfox & Brothers. The remake was released for iOS in March 2011, for Android in April 2012, for Windows in August 2012, and for Fire OS in September 2012.

== Gameplay ==
Each car can be equipped with a number of upgrades that increase defensive capabilities (armor), handling (tires) and speed (engine). While the default chain gun cannot be upgraded on any car, better cars are available for purchase, with default guns that have stronger firepower. The six cars available, from weakest to strongest, are the Vagabond (the starting car), Dervish, Sentinel (which is the best car available in the shareware version), Shrieker, Wraith, and Deliverator. Additional power-ups can be purchased in the Black Market. These include bumper spikes, land mines and rocket fuel. Before each race, the player can also ask for a loan and/or bribe a mechanic to tamper with the car of the highest-ranked opponent in the race (with the exception of the Adversary's car); this causes a random amount of damage from 25% to 49%. Reaching 1st place on the leaderboard allows players to take on the game's final racer, the Adversary, who drives a souped-up Deliverator with very powerful miniguns. Defeating the Adversary means that players become the new champion of Death Rally.

== Freeware re-release ==
In May 2009, programmer Jari Komppa contacted Remedy and volunteered to prepare an open-source release of Death Rally. Since releasing the game as open-source could not be agreed upon, Komppa instead started working on porting the game to Windows. Based on Komppa's work, Remedy released Death Rally for Windows as proprietary freeware on 20 October 2009. The re-released version does not support multiplayer network games because the original code used for IPX networks would have been too expensive to adapt to the Windows architecture.

An article chronicling Komppa's work was printed in an April 2010 issue of Game Developer magazine and later posted online.

== Remake ==
iOS version of Death Rally with on-screen touch controls

A full remake of the game was developed by Cornfox & Brothers and its parent Mountain Sheep, and was released by Remedy Entertainment for iOS and Android on 31 March 2011. The remake includes in-game cameo appearances from various different game characters, including Barry Wheeler from Alan Wake, John Gore from Minigore (voiced by Arin Hanson) and Mighty Eagle from Angry Birds. Duke Nukem also appears as an opponent, as he did in the original game. By December 2011, the remake had been downloaded 1.8 million times, recouping its eight-month development costs in three days.

== Reception ==
Reception

Aggregate score
Aggregator	Score
Metacritic	iOS (remake): 77/100; PC (remake): 62/100

Review scores
Publication	Score
Destructoid	iOS: 8/10
GameSpot	DOS: 8.5/10; PC: 4/10
IGN	iOS: 7.5/10
Next Generation	DOS: 3/5
Pocket Gamer	iOS: 7/10
TouchArcade	iOS: 5/5
148Apps	iOS: 4/5
AppSpy	iOS: 4/5
TouchGen	iOS: 4/5

Both the original game and the remake have received a generally positive response. The iOS version holds aggregate scores of 77 out of 100 based on 19 reviews on Metacritic. The 2012 Windows port of the remake was not as well received, holding aggregate scores of 62 out of 100 based on 11 reviews.

GameSpot's Chris Hudak called the original game "simply the best top-down racer to come along in years, maybe even ever." A Next Generation critic commented, "Once again Apogee reminds us shareware can be fun. Death Rally is a simple, playable, enjoyable combat racing game with a retro top-down perspective and a whole lot of action." He particularly praised the numerous ways of destroying opponents and the many humorous touches.

Reviewing the 2012 Windows remake, Brett Todd criticised the controls, the repetition of tracks, the lack of any sense of speed and the necessity for grinding. He concluded "Arcade racers generally need to have an on-the-edge atmosphere where death can come at any moment via bullet or screwing up a turn. This new take on Death Rally, however, is more like riding with Miss Daisy, a genteel, distant driver as intense as a late-night cup of chamomile tea. There are just too many flaws here, with the flimsy controls, dreary tracks, and eternal grinding, for even the most desperate arcade gearhead to get anything out of this game."

Destructoid's Maurice Tan scored the iOS remake 8 out of 10. He criticised the lack of a tutorial, but concluded that "Death Rally is a lot of fun to play, it looks great, runs smooth, and it's very addictive." IGN's Levi Buchanan scored it 7.5 out of 10, writing "Death Rally left me smiling. Gaining new cars, equipping upgraded weapons, and blasting rivals is certainly fun and this is the best such mayhem has looked on the App Store." Pocket Gamer's Tracy Erickson scored it 7 out of 10, criticising the lack of customisable controls and the design of some of the tracks; "Death Rally provides plenty of cool weapons and rides, yet the absence of [...] tighter track designs prevent it from being truly killer."

Jordan Minor of 148Apps scored it 4 out of 5, writing "A game like Death Rally can't help but be a little mindless. After all, it's about cars blowing each other up. Just know that it's dumb fun with emphasis on the fun." AppSpy's Andrew Nesvadba also scored it 4 out of 5, praising the basic gameplay mechanics; "The real driving force behind Death Rally comes from watching bars fill up after each match and constantly picking up pieces of scrap that go towards new cars and weapons – it's shallow, but strangely appealing despite the repetitive gameplay." TouchGen's Pat Dunn also scored it 4 out of 5, writing "the game is solid. The level variants are fun and different enough to keep you playing for at least a couple run throughs of the game. Also, the fact that each weapon and car has multiple upgrades keeps you wanting to play in order to perfect the upgrade aspects of the game." TouchArcade's Jared Nelson was slightly more impressed, scoring it 5 out of 5 and writing "Death Rally is one of the finest top-down racers in the App Store. Death Rally isn't perfect mind you, but it's an absolutely gorgeous title with satisfying combat-heavy racing and an engaging upgrade system."

Death Rally was selected in 2017 for a collection of 100 classical Finnish games, which were presented on the opening of the Finnish Museum of Games in Tampere.

The game sold 90,000 units.
