= Player Select =

2014 studio album by Starbomb

Studio album by Starbomb
- Released: December 16, 2014
- Recorded: Summer 2014
- Studios: Los Angeles, United States
- Genres: Comedy hip hop; synth-pop; nerdcore; novelty
- Length: 25:55
- Label: Self-released
- Producer: Brian Wecht

Starbomb chronology
Starbomb (2013)	Player Select (2014)	The TryForce (2019)

Professional ratings
Review scores
Source	Rating
AllMusic	3.5/5 stars

Player Select is the second studio album by American comedy supergroup Starbomb, composed of Dan Avidan and Brian Wecht of American comedy duo Ninja Sex Party and Flash animator and Internet personality Arin Hanson. The album was released December 16, 2014 on iTunes, Amazon Music, Spotify and CDBaby. Following in the direction of the previous album, Player Select is mostly a video game parody album featuring the often-provocative adult comedy of Ninja Sex Party and incorporating the video-game humor of Hanson.

== Background ==
Starbomb was a very hinted-at project with leaks and rumors circulating in June and July 2013 shortly after Avidan joined the online Let's Play webseries Game Grumps. It was half-confirmed by Avidan during his guest appearance on the July 12, 2013, stream of Polaris video gaming show Friendzone!, stating that he was thinking of names for a new music project he was starting with Brian Wecht, his partner in Ninja Sex Party.

Due to the majority of the first Starbomb album's criticism being aimed at its constant use of extremely sexual lyrics, Player Select takes a different approach by severely reducing the amount of sexuality in its lyrics. This was a conscious, self-imposed challenge that Hanson, Avidan, and Wecht agreed upon while writing the album in an effort to stay fresh and avoid repeating themselves. The resulting album focuses more on satirizing plot or character details regarding certain games, such as how Luigi consistently questions the violent nature of the Super Smash Bros. franchise throughout the song "Smash!"

== Promotion ==
Player Select was also a half-confirmed album in a statement from the track "Outro" from the previous album. No other news was heard of the album until fan speculation of a second album started circulating in October and November 2014. The album and its release date, cover art and title were finally confirmed by all three members of Starbomb via three consequent videos featuring the group in their Los Angeles studio, each containing a separate snippet from one track of the album. The video that Hanson posted contained a snippet from "The Hero of Rhyme," Avidan and Wecht's video had a snippet from "Mortal Kombat High," and the video on the Game Grumps channel had a snippet of "Robots in Need of Disguise." Included in each video were links to pre-order the album digitally through iTunes and Amazon Music, or the physical CD through CDBaby.

== Track listing ==
All tracks are written by Arin Hanson, Dan Avidan, and Brian Wecht.

No.	Title	Parody of	Length
1.	"Intro"		1:24
2.	"Smash!" (featuring Markiplier and Saucy Cosplays)	Super Smash Bros.	2:37
3.	"Robots in Need of Disguise"	The Transformers	2:32
4.	"The Hero of Rhyme"	The Legend of Zelda	1:57
5.	"Toad Joins the Band"	Super Mario	0:54
6.	"The New Pokérap"	Pokémon	1:51
7.	"Glass Joe's Title Fight"	Punch-Out!!	2:18
8.	"Mortal Kombat High"	Mortal Kombat	2:18
9.	"Inky's Lament"	Pac-Man	1:20
10.	"God of No More"	God of War	2:16
11.	"Atari Mystery Hour"	Pong	0:41
12.	"Minecraft is for Everyone" (featuring Notch)	Minecraft	2:04
13.	"The Simple Plot of Metal Gear Solid"	Metal Gear Solid	2:46
14.	"Outro"		0:37
Total length:			25:55

== Personnel ==
Starbomb

- Danny Sexbang – vocals
- Egoraptor – vocals
- Ninja Brian – music

Additional personnel

- Mark Fischbach – vocals (track 2)
- Emily Hughes – background vocals (track 2)
- Markus Persson – background vocals (track 12)

Technical

- Egoraptor – producer
- Ninja Brian – producer
- Dan Castellani – mixing
- David Dominguez – engineer
- Hans Dekline – mastering

== Charts ==
=== Weekly charts ===
Chart (2015)	Peak position
US Billboard 200	58
US Digital Albums (Billboard)	14
US Independent Albums (Billboard)	2
US Top Album Sales (Billboard)	46
US Top Comedy Albums (Billboard)	1
US Top Rap Albums (Billboard)	4

=== Year-end charts ===
Chart (2015)	Position
US Top Comedy Albums (Billboard)	3

== Release history ==
Region	Date	Format	Label	Catalog no.
Australia	December 16, 2014	Digital download, stream	Self-released	none
United Kingdom	December 16, 2014	Digital download, stream	Self-released	none
United States	December 16, 2014	Digital download, stream	Self-released	none
United States	December 16, 2014	CD	Self-released	889211198962
