= Starbomb =

American video game-based comedy music group

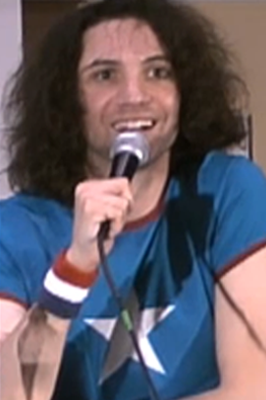
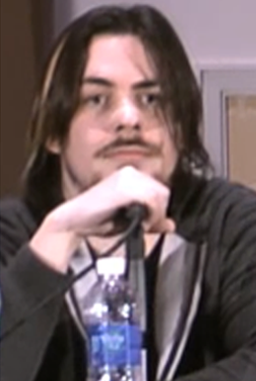
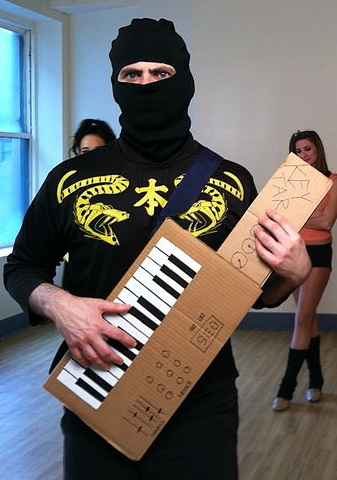
- Members of Starbomb Dan Avidan, Arin Hanson and Brian Wecht

Background information
- Origin: Los Angeles, California, U.S.
- Genres: Comedy hip hop; synth-pop; nerdcore; rap rock
- Years active: 2013–2019; 2023–present
- Spinoff of: Ninja Sex Party
- Members: Dan Avidan; Arin Hanson; Brian Wecht
- Website: starbomb.com

Starbomb is an American musical comedy group composed of Dan Avidan and Brian Wecht of musical comedy duo Ninja Sex Party together with Internet personality Arin Hanson. The songs of Starbomb consist of video game parodies; Avidan provides sung vocals, Hanson provides rapping vocals, and Wecht performs instruments. All three are also known as a part of YouTube Let's Play web series Game Grumps. The band have collaborated with TWRP, a Canadian music group known for collaborations with NSP.

The group has released four studio albums, Starbomb (2013), Player Select (2014), The TryForce (2019), and Starbomb Boom: Rise of Lyrics (2024). Starbomb has also released several music videos, which occasionally feature known Internet, film, and video game fandom personalities such as Markiplier and Ashly Burch. Although the project was not announced until 2013, Hanson stated that the band had actually been formed "way before", without specifying when.

== History ==
=== Formation and Starbomb (2013) ===
In summer 2013, Avidan began making comments about creating a new music project with Wecht and Hanson. The project wasn't officially announced until December 2, 2013, when the group released a preview of their song "I Choose You to Die" on Ninja Sex Party's official YouTube channel. They also announced that their first album, the self-titled Starbomb, would be released only two weeks later on December 17, 2013. Leading up to the album's launch date, the group released further previews on the Ninja Sex Party and Game Grumps YouTube channels, the latter of which was hosted by Avidan and Hanson.

In the weeks following its release, Starbomb placed on multiple Billboard charts, reaching #1 on Comedy Albums and Heatseekers Albums. Music videos for several of the album's songs such as "Luigi's Ballad" (in which Rachel Bloom voiced Princess Peach) and "It's Dangerous to Go Alone" were released to YouTube that same year and in spring of the following year. Destructoid commented on the album's release, stating that "While the concept itself may seem a bit juvenile, the awesome music (provided by Ninja Sex Party) and hilarious situations are more than enough to keep the more 'mature' fan entertained."

=== Player Select (2014) ===
Starbomb's final song, "Outro", hinted at a future album. However, no official confirmation of a second album was forthcoming until fall of the following year. On December 16, 2014, Starbomb's second album, Player Select, was released. Like its predecessor, snippets of the album's songs were released on YouTube prior to its release. Additionally, Player Select placed on several Billboard charts, and achieved #1 on Comedy Albums. Player Select also charted on position #3 on Billboard's end of year charts for US Comedy Albums. AllMusic gave the album an overall favorable review, remarking that "Plenty of swearing and 8-bit innuendo make this for the adult retro gamer and not the kids, but the laughs are plentiful and big."

=== The TryForce (2015–2019) ===
In the video for "The Simple Plot of Metal Gear Solid", released on December 25, 2015, Hanson indicated there would be a third album.

On March 31, 2017, it was announced Hanson would join Ninja Sex Party for the Rock Hard 2017 tour, performing as Starbomb. However, on July 5, 2017, Hanson announced that he would not make the remainder of the Rock Hard Tour dates.

On November 7, 2017, the official Instagram for the band posted images of Hanson and Wecht working on a new project, with the caption, "Interesting things are happening...". On November 15, 2017, a third album was teased again, with the Starbomb Twitter account posting "hey @tomhanks do u want to do a guest verse on our next album, this is a serious offer" which never received an official response.

On a November 28, 2017, episode of Game Grumps, Avidan and Hanson confirmed that they had finished recording the third Starbomb album in El Paso, Texas. The writing and recording process was very different from previous albums, as the trio challenged themselves by spending only one day writing and recording each song; they also mentioned a tentative release date of December 2018. Tupper Ware Remix Party, Ninja Sex Party's frequent recording and touring partner band, will be featured on the album. On a July 29, 2018, episode of Game Grumps, Hanson and Avidan announced that the title of the upcoming album was The TryForce, "as in, we're trying our best! We're a force that tries", with a planned December 2018 release. On August 19, 2018, Ninja Sex Party mentioned in a Facebook post that The TryForce would be produced by Jim Roach, who had produced their album Cool Patrol; Wecht had acted as producer on previous Starbomb albums.

Regarding the songwriting process, Hanson stated in July 2018 that the third album was an equal effort between the three members, in opposition to previous albums in which he felt that Avidan and Wecht were responsible for most of the songwriting. He stated "my footprint on the first two albums wasn't super huge. It was... Ninja Sex Party does video game songs, featuring Egoraptor, you know, whereas the third Starbomb album really feels like we all wrote it together." Later the same month, Avidan agreed that the new album would be more of a team effort in a video.

On December 23, 2018, the official Starbomb Twitter account released an image that was presumed to be a small portion of the album cover for The TryForce. Over the course of the next few months, they also released several more portions of the image.

On January 8, 2019, in a Game Grumps video titled "2019 Game Grumps Updates + More!", Avidan and Hanson stated that The TryForce would be due for a late March 2019 release. On February 4, 2019, Starbomb announced in a new animated music video (for their first album's "Regretroid") that the album would instead be released on April 19, 2019. On March 29, 2019, a Game Grumps video titled "NEW STARBOMB ALBUM (2019)" confirmed that pre-orders for The TryForce would be available April 5, 2019.

On April 5, 2019, a music video for "Blowing the Payload", Starbomb's first original song since 2014, was released on Egoraptor's YouTube channel, titled, "Overwatch RAP". On April 12, 2019, another new video, for the song, "A Boy and His Boat", titled, "BEST Zelda Rap IN THE WORLD!!!" was uploaded to the same channel. On April 19, 2019, the album's release date, a music video for "Welcome to the Mario Party" was uploaded to the channel, titled, "SICKEST Mario Party RAP!!". On April 26, 2019, another new video, for the song, "Filling in the Name Of", titled, "Tetris RAP ANIMATED! The Long Piece is the BEST PIECE!!" was uploaded to the same channel.

On April 19, 2019, the album was released, along with several new merchandise items.

=== Starbomb Boom: Rise of Lyrics (2023–2024) ===
In a tweet on February 27, 2023, Starbomb announced that a fourth album was in development. On March 22, 2024, a sneak peek of the album was tweeted. In an Instagram post on August 12, 2024, Starbomb announced the music video for the song "Pokémon Smash or Pass", which was released on Friday, August 16. In an Instagram post on October 23, 2024, they announced the release date for the music video for the song "Kiss The Elden Ring", alongside the album itself. Both then released that same week, on October 25, 2024. The album’s name is in reference to Sonic Boom: Rise of Lyric, a game famously played by Arin and Dan on Game Grumps.

== Discography ==
=== Studio albums ===
Title	Album details
Starbomb	Released: December 17, 2013; Label: Self-released; Format: Digital download, streaming, CD
Player Select	Released: December 16, 2014; Label: Self-released; Format: Digital download, streaming, CD
The TryForce	Released: April 19, 2019; Label: Self-released; Format: Digital download, streaming, CD
Starbomb Boom: Rise of Lyrics	Released: October 25, 2024; Label: Self-released; Format: Digital download, streaming, CD, Vinyl

=== Compilations ===
Title	Album details
The Essential Collection	Released: March 4, 2022; Label: Self-released; Format: Vinyl

== Members ==
Band members

- Dan Avidan (aka Danny Sexbang) – lead and backing vocals, rapping (2013–2019, 2023–present)
- Arin Hanson (aka Egoraptor) – rapping, backing and lead vocals, production (2013–2019, 2023–present)
- Brian Wecht (aka Ninja Brian) – keyboards, programming, production (2013–2019, 2023–present)

Session and touring musicians

- TWRP – backup band, opening act (2015–2019)
  - Lord Phobos – guitar
  - Commander Meouch – bass guitar, backing vocals
  - Doctor Sung – keytar, synthesizer, modified vocals
  - Havve Hogan – drums

== Commercial performance ==
Chart	Peak position	Album	Year
US Independent Albums (Billboard)	42	Starbomb	2013
US Comedy Albums (Billboard)	1	Starbomb	2013
US Heatseekers Albums (Billboard)	1	Starbomb	2013
US Rap Albums (Billboard)	17	Starbomb	2013
US Independent Albums (Billboard)	2	Player Select	2014
US Comedy Albums (Billboard)	1	Player Select	2014
US Rap Albums (Billboard)	4	Player Select	2014
Australian Digital Albums (ARIA)	9	The TryForce	2019
Canadian Albums (Billboard)	96	The TryForce	2019
Scottish Albums (Official Charts)	44	The TryForce	2019
US Billboard 200	22	The TryForce	2019
US Digital Albums (Billboard)	6	The TryForce	2019
US Independent Albums (Billboard)	2	The TryForce	2019
US Top Album Sales (Billboard)	4	The TryForce	2019
US Top Comedy Albums (Billboard)	1	The TryForce	2019
US Top Rap Albums (Billboard)	10	The TryForce	2019

=== Year-end charts ===
Chart (2015)	Position	Album	Year
US Comedy Albums (Billboard)	3	Player Select	2015
