= House Party (video game) =

2022 adult adventure game by Eek! Games

- Steam store banner
- Developers: Eek! Games, LLC
- Publishers: Eek! Games, LLC
- Writers: Henry Kulick, Bobby Ricci, Don Strickland
- Engine: Unity
- Platform: Microsoft Windows
- Release: WW: July 15, 2022
- Genres: Adventure, dating sim
- Mode: Single-player

House Party is an adventure video game developed and published by American studio Eek! Games, LLC on digital distribution platforms for Microsoft Windows. The game became available under early access in June 2017 and was officially released with it leaving early access on July 15, 2022. House Party became a commercial success with high sales, although its strong sexual content and themes have led it to be banned by the Twitch platform.

== Gameplay and setting ==
The game begins with an introductory cutscene showing the player character receiving a text from either their friend Derek or Brittney, depending on the gender of the player character chosen, with an invitation to a house party that their friend is currently attending. After arriving to the party by a ridesharing app, the player stumbles and drops their phone, cracking its screen and effectively breaking it. They then pick up their phone and enter through the front door of the house, in which the party is in progress.

Upon entering, the player is able to converse with any of the party guests using a drop down conversation menu to select a dialogue option or action. The player may receive opportunities from these guests, which involve objectives in which the player can solve by picking up, talking to, or using items on a variety of other objects and people in the game. Completing these objectives will either positively or negatively affect your disposition with the guests it involves. Some opportunities are similar in vein to a quest line, with which completing one will give the player access to a new one that will allow them to further increase their disposition with the character giving the opportunity. Upon completing an opportunity chain for a particular character, the player may be able to engage in explicit sexual activities with said character. Due to the branching nature of these opportunities that may cut off opportunities with other characters, not all of them can be completed in a singular playthrough of the game, encouraging replayability. Additionally, Eek! Games offer tools on their website to craft a custom story including full dialogues, interactions, and logic dictating how the player's night goes and import it into the game.

== Development ==
In July 2018, the game was removed from sale on Steam after a number of complaints over the game's content. House Party is now available in two different versions, the base game is rated "Mature" via Steam in which sex scenes are censored with black censor bars. There is an Explicit Content Add-On DLC rated "Adult Only”, (satisfying Steam's terms of service agreement) that removes the censorship.

In 2018, Eek! Games held a competition to invite members of the public to audition to be included as part of the game with the gaming community to vote for their favorite. Of the entrants, two winners would be selected, one from the male entrants and other from the female entrants. On November 2, 2018, it was announced that streamer and influencer "Lety Does Stuff" and the members of Game Grumps, Arin Hanson and Dan Avidan, were selected as the winners.

On April 11, 2019, Eek! Games announced the winners of their indie music artist contest. Popskyy and his song "FUNKBOX" were the winner, along with special mentions to Fokushi with the song "Dreamer", Treclar with the song "Whip-its", Kitanic Demon with the song "Chillax with KitanicDemon" and Fletnyx with the song "Chocolate Chip Cookies". In March 2022, it was announced that the game would finally be coming out of early access, alongside the option to play as a female character and the addition of the singer Doja Cat as a new guest in the game.

== Release ==
The game's early access launch was a success; according to the developer, the game sold over 30,000 copies in the first few weeks, and 300,000 total sales during the first year. As of February 2023, the game has sold over 800,000 copies worldwide.

Due to its strong sexual content and themes, Twitch blocked users from streaming gameplay footage of the title, regardless of which version of the game was being played.

== Reception ==
Reception

Aggregate score
Aggregator	Score
GameRankings	20.00%

Because of the controversial nature of the game, it was quickly popularized by gaming streamers and influencers such as the Game Grumps, PewDiePie, Jacksepticeye, NerdCubed, and others.

The game so far has few reviews by critics, John Walker of Rock, Paper, Shotgun named the game as "Worst Game of the Year" for 2017, criticizing its portrayal of women as misogynistic.
