= Ian Eastwood =

U.S. dance artist

- Born: April 16, 1993 (age 32); Chicago, Illinois
- Occupation: dancer, choreographer, director
- Years active: 2007-present
- Height: 1.78 m (5 ft 10 in)
- Career
- Current group: The Young Lions, Rock Steady Crew
- Former groups: Most Wanted Crew
- Website: www.ian-eastwood.com

Ian Anthony Eastwood (born April 16, 1993) is an actor, dancer, choreographer, director and previous member of the dance group, Mos Wanted Crew, featured on America's Best Dance Crew. He was featured on NBC's new TV show World of Dance as Ian Eastwood and the Young Lions. He has also worked with The Millennium Dance Complex, Coastal Dance Rage, and Movement Lifestyle. He appeared on Dance Showdown and Return of the Superstars. He has also starred in the 2016 movie High Strung.

== Early life ==
Eastwood was born in Chicago, Illinois. He is the son of Peter and Julia Eastwood. He started dancing at the age of 10 years old and later moved to Hollywood after graduating high school to pursue a career in dance.

== Videography ==
=== Film ===
Title	Year	Role	Notes
2016	High Strung	Rik	

=== Television ===
Title	Year	Role	Network	Notes	Ref.
America's Best Dance Crew	2012	Himself; Dancer	MTV	Member of Mos Wanted Crew (Season 7)	
Dancing with the Stars	2012	Performer	ABC	Guest, (Season 15, Episode 04)	
106 & Park	2014	Himself	BET	Together with Vic Mensa	
World of Dance	2017	Himself	NBC	Competing with the Young Lions	

=== Commercials ===
Company and product	Year	Featured song(s)	Description	Ref.
Ubisoft Music video game	2011	"I Gotta Feeling" (2016) "Boom Boom Pow" "Let's Get It Started" (Spike Mix) "Don't Stop the Party" "The Time"	"The Black Eyed Peas Experience". Eastwood and others dancing the game.	

=== Music videos ===
Title	Year	Artist	Notes	Ref.
"Beauty and a Beat"	2012	Justin Bieber	Dancer	
"Replay"	2013	Zendaya	Dancer	style="text-align:left;"
"Harlem Hopscotch"	2014	Maya Angelou		
"Paper Hearts"	2014	Tori Kelly	Dancer, Lead Choreographer	
"Feel That"	2014	Vic Mensa	Dancer, Lead Choreographer	
"Danger"	2014	Lee Taemin	Lead Choreographer	
"Daybreak Rain"	2014	Shannon	Lead Choreographer	
"Sober"	2015	Childish Gambino	Lead Choreographer	
"View"	2015	SHINee	Lead Choreographer	
"Cliffs Edge"	2015	Hayley Kiyoko	Lead Choreographer	
"Chained Up"	2015	VIXX	Lead Choreographer	
"Sunday Candy"	2015	Donnie Trumpet & the Social Experiment	Dancer, Lead Choreographer, Co-Director	
"R.I.P. 2 My Youth"	2015	The Neighbourhood	Dancer, Lead Choreographer	
"No Pressure"	2015	Justin Bieber	Dancer, Lead Choreographer	
"Neverland"	2016	Zendaya	Dancer, Lead Choreographer	
"JULY"	2016	Kris Wu	Dancer, Lead Choreographer	
"LOSE CONTROL"	2016	Zhang Yixing	Dancer, Lead Choreographer	
"Angels"	2016	Chance The Rapper	Dancer, Lead Choreographer	|
"Summer on You" (Dance Video)	2018	PrettyMuch	Director, Choreographer	
"Rock Witchu" (Dance Video)	2019	PrettyMuch	Director, Choreographer	
"E.T.A."	2020	Justin Bieber	Dancer, Choreographer	|
"Stars"	2021	PrettyMuch	Choreographer	
"Smackables"	2021	PrettyMuch	Director, Choreographer, Dancer, Editor	
"Corpus Christi"	2021	PrettyMuch	Choreographer	
"Trust"	2021	PrettyMuch	Director, Choreographer	
"Standing Next To You"	2023	Jungkook	Dancer	
