= Arin Hanson =

American Internet personality (born 1987)

- Hanson in 2023
- Born: Arin Joseph Hanson; January 6, 1987 (age 39); Margate, Florida, U.S.
- Other name: Egoraptor
- Occupations: YouTuber; actor; rapper; animator; boxer
- Spouse: Suzanne Berhow (m. 2013)

YouTube information
- Channel: Egoraptor
- Years active: 2004–present
- Genres: Animation; comedy; music; gaming
- Subscribers: 2.84 million
- Views: 609 million
- Last updated: November 11, 2026
- Website: egoraptor.net

Arin Joseph Hanson (born January 6, 1987), also known as Egoraptor, is an American YouTuber, actor, rapper, and animator. He is well known for his Flash cartoons, as well as being the co-founder and co-star of the popular YouTube Let's Play series Game Grumps.

Hanson has created numerous shorts and web series on Newgrounds and YouTube, including The Awesome Series, which parodies video game franchises like Pokémon and Metal Gear, and Sequelitis, a series of animated video essays in which he humorously compares a video game and one of its sequels. He has also voice-acted for television and video games. He regularly collaborates with Ninja Sex Party, a musical comedy duo consisting of Game Grumps co-host Dan Avidan and Brian Wecht, with whom he formed the nerdcore/parody musical trio Starbomb.

== Early life ==
Arin Joseph Hanson was born to Lloyd and Maurette Hanson on January 6, 1987, in Margate, Florida. For a few years, his family lived in New Hampshire, but Hanson largely grew up in Florida. From an early age, he had an interest in art and experimented with stop motion animation. Hanson's mother pulled him out of high school after the first day of his sophomore year; he instead pursued and received a GED.

== Career ==
=== Animation ===
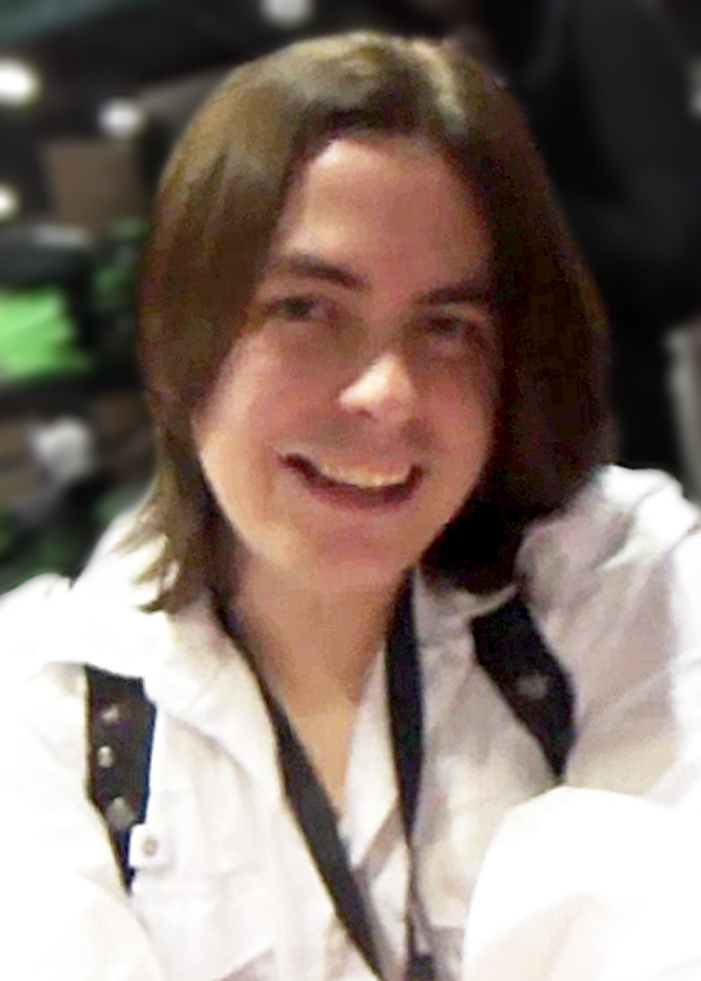
Hanson at Anime Expo in 2011

Hanson joined Newgrounds under the name "Egoraptor" on September 16, 2001. He released his first animation on DeviantArt, titled "Final Fantasy 7 Flash Spoof", on September 18, 2004. He submitted his first Awesome animation, "Metal Gear Awesome," to Newgrounds on February 23, 2006. Hanson went on to upload other comedic video game-related animations, as well as four separate animated webseries (which he then uploaded to YouTube later on); Awesome, short animated videos that parody video games, Lemon 'n Bill, a comedic series in which an anthropomorphic bullet and lemon get trapped within video game worlds, Girlchan in Paradise, a parody of shōnen anime. After producers at MTV saw "Metal Gear Awesome", Hanson was then approached by the channel to produce animated shorts for MTV's online gaming show, The G-Hole.

Hanson continued animating through the early 2010s with Sequelitis, a series in which Hanson compares a video game and its sequel along with animations throughout the video. A fourth and final episode of the series was released in 2014.

=== Voice acting ===
In 2006, Hanson starred as the sole voice actor in the animated short J.I.M. on Newgrounds, created by Lee McGuire.

In 2006, Hanson got his very first role in voice acting as the voice of Bruce Banner in the video game Marvel: Ultimate Alliance. However, after doing his voice work, Hanson's voice went ultimately unused, and the character was played by Robin Atkin Downes instead for unknown reasons, although his voice was used in the Wii port. Hanson's voice would later go on to be used in the 2016 re-release of Marvel: Ultimate Alliance, in place of Robin Atkin Downes.

In 2009, Hanson provided the voice for the character John Gore in the video game Minigore, and later reprised the role in the 2011 remake of Death Rally.

In 2012, Hanson provided his voice for the game Detective Grimoire, a Kickstarter project which was successfully funded on August 3, 2012. Hanson has also voiced various characters for Hex Heroes, Dragon Age: Inquisition, Target Acquired, Red vs. Blue, Cyanide & Happiness, and Rick and Morty.

From 2016 to 2018, Hanson was a regular on Cartoon Network's Mighty Magiswords providing the voice of Gateaux, the monosyllabic partner of sorceress Moribidia, played by Mary Faber. He also plays other recurring characters such as Fibby Croax, Delivery Man Steve, Zonq, as well as many other various additional characters. According to series creator, Kyle Carrozza, Hanson was originally approached for character design on the show, but he declined. Although aware of his voice work, Carrozza was not aware of Hanson's SAG-AFTRA membership until he informed him, which led to him being cast on the show.

In 2016, Hanson was added as an Announcer in Move or Die. Hanson has also voiced multiple characters in the Disney series The Owl House. Two of those characters being the Snaggleback and The Titan.

In 2026, Hanson voiced Kaufmo in the The Amazing Digital Circus episode "Remember".

=== Game Grumps ===
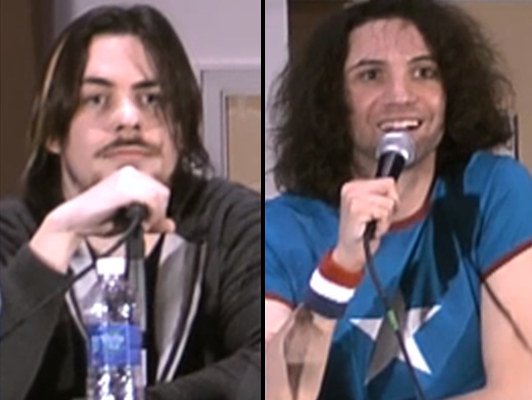
Hanson (left) with Avidan, pictured in 2015; both hosts of Game Grumps

In July 2012, Hanson and his colleague Jon Jafari (known for his comedy webseries JonTron) created a joint YouTube channel, called Game Grumps. In late June 2013, Dan Avidan, of the band Ninja Sex Party, replaced Jafari when he retired from Game Grumps to focus on his personal channel. On Game Grumps, Hanson and Avidan play video games and talk, to an often comedic effect. Hanson has also appeared on the channel's spin-off shows Steam Train and GrumpCade, along with other Game Grumps members in a similar format to the parent show; he and Avidan also front the 10 Minute Power Hour, in which they engage in various activities.

The popularity of Game Grumps led to live performances at the Hollywood Improv in late March 2016. Completely sold out, the event led to future performances in New York and other locations on the East Coast, which itself led to further shows across the United States and internationally through their own touring company.

=== Collaborations ===
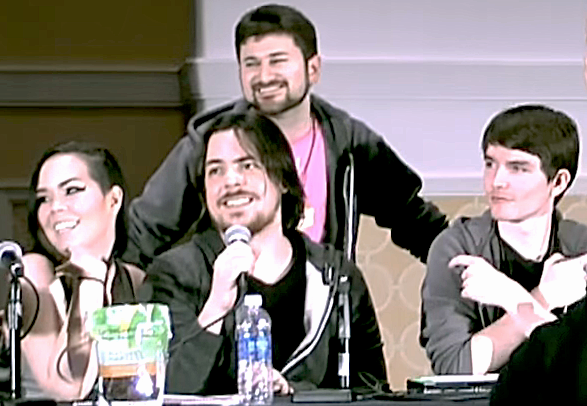
Hanson (bottom center) with other members of Game Grumps in 2015

In 2008, Hanson worked together with Ross O'Donovan on the animated webseries Gamer Tonight where he provided the voice of the host, which was broadcast on the Australian television show Good Game. He also voiced a character in asdfmovie4 in 2011, a series by TomSka.

In February 2012, Hanson appeared as a contestant on the Sony game show The Tester, during its third season, as a community-voted contestant, but was falsely accused of using the show to promote himself. He later admitted that he applied to spite a former bully, while on the show itself he behaved in a way he described as actively trolling it, until he was reprimanded on camera. When asked about his experience, and whether or not he would do it again, he replied negatively. Hanson won the third season of the dance competition web series Dance Showdown, alongside professional dancer, Maxine Hupy. Hanson has also done narration work for several episodes of Did You Know Gaming? Besides providing additional work for online series on YouTube and Newgrounds, Hanson has been featured in several videos for the website ScrewAttack, including a collaboration with James Rolfe and Keith Apicary.

In May 2022, Hanson fought against Harley Morenstein of Epic Meal Time in a boxing match which was part of the charity event Creator Clash, hosted by fellow content creator iDubbbz.

=== Music ===
In 2013, Hanson performed the intro and outro to Gammer's mix on Disc 3 of the compilation Clubland X-Treme Hardcore 9.

In 2013, Hanson, along with Game Grumps co-host and Ninja Sex Party singer-songwriter Dan Avidan and instrumentalist Brian Wecht, formed the band Starbomb. They released their first album, named Starbomb in December 2013, which went on to become No. 1 on the Billboard Comedy Charts. Starbomb went on to release their second album one year later December 2014, titled Player Select. In early 2016, Hanson performed with Starbomb at their first live event at SXSW.

On April 15, 2014, Fat Refund, a rap song, was released on the channel StamperTV, a collaboration between several animators and voice actors including Rice Pirate, Marc M., Stamper, and Hanson himself.

Hanson has also provided some spoken vocals for several songs by the band Tupper Ware Remix Party.

Starbomb released their third studio album, The TryForce, on April 19, 2019.

Starbomb released their fourth studio album, Starbomb Boom: Rise of Lyrics, on October 25, 2024.

=== Other work ===
In 2013, Hanson made an appearance on the webseries Hot Pepper Gaming. He reviewed Monster Hunter 3 Ultimate after eating a habanero pepper. In 2014, he returned to the show, reviewing the game Metal Gear Solid V: Ground Zeroes while eating a Bhut jolokia. In 2015, Hanson again appeared on the show, reviewing the game Metal Gear Solid V: The Phantom Pain while consuming Sichuan peppers.

Hanson also starred alongside Avidan in Good Game, a YouTube Original Series. In addition to acting in the series, Hanson also served as an executive producer.

In January 2018, Hanson and Game Grumps manager Brent Lilley co-founded tour management company Real Good Touring, which organizes tours for internet personalities and independent performers.

Hanson's channel name "Egoraptor" has been featured as a cheat code in the 2019 Metroidvania game Bloodstained: Ritual of the Night, along with several other prominent YouTube personalities.

In March 2020, Hanson released his first novel, Ghost Hunters Adventure Club and the Secret of the Grande Chateau, under the pen name "Dr. Cecil H. H. Mills" (proclaimed by Hanson to be his uncle, and a controversial literary figure, but obviously portrayed by Hanson himself in interviews and advertisements). A sequel, Ghost Hunters Adventure Club and the Express Train to Nowhere was released in 2022.

== Personal life ==
Hanson met his wife, Suzanne "Suzy" Berhow (b. July 3, 1989), at a convention in 2002 and the two started dating some years later. Hanson proposed to her in 2011, and they married on October 25, 2013, at the Natural History Museum of Los Angeles County. Berhow uses the pseudonym Mortem3r online and has her own gaming channel titled KittyKatGaming, in which Hanson was often featured from 2015 to 2019.

In July 2009, Hanson moved from his parents' house in West Palm Beach, Florida, to California. He formerly lived with Berhow in Glendale, California.

Hanson is bisexual.

== Boxing record ==
2 fights	1 win	1 loss
By knockout	1	1

No.	Result	Record	Opponent	Type	Round, time	Date	Location	Notes
2	Win	1–1	Jarvis Johnson	TKO	2 (5), 1:08	April 15, 2023	Amalie Arena, Tampa, Florida, U.S.	
1	Loss	0–1	Harley Morenstein	TKO	2 (5), 1:27	May 14, 2022	Yuengling Center, Tampa, Florida, U.S.	

== Filmography ==
=== Film ===
Year	Title	Role
2019	A Heist with Markiplier	Alien 1
2022	In Space with Markiplier	Narrator
2022	Anomaly Found – Chase Brody	Assessor

=== Television ===
Year	Title	Role	Notes	Source
2008	Gamer Tonight	Talk Show Host	Voice	
2015	Rick and Morty	Cyborg Photographer	Voice, episode: "The Wedding Squanchers"	
2016	Very Important House	Fantastic Being	Voice, pilot only	
2016–18	Mighty Magiswords	Gateaux	Voice	
2020–23	The Owl House	Snaggleback, Papa Titan, various others	Voice, recurring role	
2022	Bee and Puppycat	Wesley Wizard	Voice, recurring role	

=== Web series ===
Year	Title	Role	Notes
2005	Metal Gear Crisis	Solid Snake	Voice, 2 episodes
2009	Life in the Portal	Egoraptor	Episode: "Madness"
2009–10	Gameoverse	All Characters	Voice, 4 episodes
2010–21	Eddsworld	Super Guy	Various episodes
2011	asdfmovie	Mugger, Kid Getting Mugged	Voice, episode: "asdfmovie4"
2011, 2015	JonTron	Vitalia, Darth Vader, Himself	2 episodes
2011, 2013	PONY.MOV	Rarity, Pinkie Pie	3 episodes
2012	The Tester	Himself	Contestant; 3 episodes
2012–present	Game Grumps	Himself	Co-host; also co-creator and theme music composer
2012–16	Did You Know Gaming?	Himself	Voice, 11 episodes
2013–15, 2021	Cyanide & Happiness Shorts	Ted Bear, Cliff Miller	Voice, 5 episodes
2013–14	Dance Showdown	Himself	Contestant and eventual winner
2015–19	KittyKatGaming	Himself	Occasional guest Also performed the show's opening sequence (2015–2018).
2015	Red vs. Blue	Crash Site Fed, Cobb	Voice, 3 episodes
2015	A Brief History	Himself	Episode: "The History of Castlevania"
2016	Bee and PuppyCat	Omelette, Elder Squat Bird	Voice, 4 episodes
2017	Good Game	Ryland Tate	Main role; 6 episodes Also executive producer
2017	The Official Podcast	Himself	Episode 58
2017–18	SuperMegaCast	Himself	3 episodes
2018	YouTubers React	Himself	3 episodes
2019–20	Un-Unexplained	Super Computer	11 episodes
2019	I Think I've Got This With Chip Chapley	Ted Bear	Episode "Are We Real?"; Audio re-used from Cyanide & Happiness Shorts
2020	Onyx Equinox	Tezcatlipoca	Voice
2021	Scott the Woz	Himself	Episode: "Borderline Forever"
2022	Ground Keith and Miss Citrus	Ground Keith	Main role
2022	Happyland Incorporated	Various	All male voices
2024–present	NOXP	Duncan	3 episodes
2025–present	Deep Space Discounts	Xancis	1 episode
2026–present	Gameoverse	Various	Pilot episode Voice; Also Executive Producer, Co-Writer, Voice Acting Director, and Audio Editor
2026	The Amazing Digital Circus	Kaufmo	Episode: "Remember"
2010	Wacky Game Jokez, 4 Kidz!	Himself	Episode 2: “Game Chat”

=== Video games ===
Year	Title	Role	Notes	Source
2007	Blue Rabbit's Climate Chaos	All voices		
2009	Minigore	John Gore		
2011	Death Rally	John Gore		
2014	Detective Grimoire	Agent Folder, Mr. Harper		
2014	Dragon Age: Inquisition	Additional voices		
2016	Target Acquired	Spike Tommery		
2016	Move or Die	Announcer		
2006	Marvel: Ultimate Alliance^{1}	Bruce Banner	2016 re-release	
2016	Accounting	The Bomb		
2017	Dream Daddy: A Dad Dating Simulator	Joseph	Also executive producer	
2018	Monster Prom	Scott Howl		
2019	River City Girls	Jimmy Lee		
2019	Never Give Up	All voices		
2020	House Party	Himself		
2020	Borderlands 3	Mancubus Bloodtooth		
2020	Final Fantasy VII Remake	Additional voices	English dub	
2022	Gunvolt Chronicles: Luminous Avenger iX 2	Ace	English dub	
2022	Omega Strikers	X		
2023	Advance Wars 1+2: Re-Boot Camp	Max		
2026	Mewgenics	Cats	Creature role	
TBA	The Cyanide & Happiness Adventure Game	Ted Bear	In development	
Unreleased	Hex Heroes	Himself	Cancelled	

^{1}Hanson's dialogue was recorded for the original 2006 release. Although he was replaced by Robin Atkin Downes in the final game, his dialogue was used for the 2016 re-release on PC, PS4 and Xbox One.

== Discography ==
=== Starbomb ===
- Starbomb (2013)
- Player Select (2014)
- The TryForce (2019)
- Starbomb Boom: Rise of Lyrics (2024)

=== Guest appearances ===
- Ninja Sex Party – "Dinosaur Laser Fight" (2011)
- Clubland X-Treme Hardcore 9: Disc 3, Part 2: Mixed by Gammer - "Intro (Knight In Shining Armour) & Outro (We Killed The Rave)" (2013)
- Geezy – "Hashtag" (2013)
- StamperTV – "FAT REFUND" (2014)
- Ninja Sex Party – "6969" (2015)
- Tupper Ware Remix Party – "Groove Crusaders" (2016)
- Tupper Ware Remix Party – "Atomic Karate" (2017)
- Tupper Ware Remix Party – "Phantom Racer" (2018)

== Bibliography ==
=== Illustrator ===
- Hanson, Arin (2018). "Illustrator". Afraid of Everything. By Tierney, Adam. Adam Tierney. ISBN 978-0-692-92317-7. Archived from the original on November 23, 2018.

== See also ==
- List of YouTubers
- Adobe Flash
