= Elle Walker =

American vlogger based in Los Angeles

- Other names: WhatsUpELLE and WhatsUpMoms on YouTube, Facebook, Twitter
- Years active: 2010–present
- Known for: Sketch comedy, vlogging
- Spouse: Ross Walker
- Children: Presley Walker, Ford Walker, and Tess Walker

YouTube information
- Channels: @WhatsUpMOMS; @whatsupelle
- Subscribers: 4.64 million (WhatsUpMoms); 412 thousand (WhatsUpELLE)
- Views: 3.86 billion (WhatsUpMoms); 157 million (WhatsUpELLE)

Elle Walker is an American vlogger based in California best known for her work on the YouTube channels WhatsUpMoms and WhatsUpELLE.

== Youtube ==
Walker initially joined the YouTube community in 2008 with her channel Whatever Hollywood, but the channel was disbanded in 2010. Walker then joined the YouTube community later in 2010 with her channel WhatsUpELLE Beginning in May 2013, she began working almost exclusively on her second channel, WhatsUpMoms, with her co-founders and friends, Meg, Connie, and Brooke. Connie died in November 2013 and is remembered fondly in many of the video postings. The channel has over 3 million subscribers and has attracted almost 2,500,000,000 views combined. They have also won many family category awards. It features fast-paced and humorous content about motherhood, including a viral parody of the Iggy Azalea song "Fancy" and a comedic message to "Friends Without Kids" The channel has attracted collaborators such as Michelle Obama and advertisers including Kohler, Puffs, and Disney. Most recently, What's Up Moms has signed on three new collaborators, Esther Anderson from Story of This Life, Kathryn from Do It On a Dime, and Karen Alpert, a New York Times bestselling author.

== Personal life ==
Walker graduated from Stanford University in 2002 with a bachelor's degree in Technology and Society where she was a member of the Kappa Alpha Theta sorority. She married Ross Walker in 2013 with whom she has three children: Presley, Ford, and Tess.
