= Gameoverse =

Australian independent-animated web series

- Genre: Action comedy
- Created by: Ross O'Donovan
- Based on: Gameoverse (2009) by Ross O'Donovan
- Written by: Arin Hanson; Ross O'Donovan
- Directed by: Ross O'Donovan
- Voices of: Erica Lindbeck; jschlatt; Arin Hanson; Christopher Sabat; Ross O'Donovan; Elsie Lovelock
- Composers: Jake Kaufman; Grant Kirkhope
- Country of origin: Australia
- Original language: English
- No. of episodes: 1

Production
- Executive producers: Kevin Lerdwichagul; Luke Lerdwichagul; Ross O'Donovan; Arin Hanson
- Producer: Charles Mohl (Note: Credited as line producer)
- Editor: Adam Smith
- Running time: 32 minutes
- Production company: Glitch Productions

Original release
- Network: YouTube
- Release: 15 May 2026 – present

Gameoverse is an Australian independent animated web series created and directed by Ross O'Donovan, co-written by Arin Hanson, and produced by Glitch Productions. It is set in a universe where video game worlds are destroyed whenever a hero defeats a villain.

The series was conceived in 2009, and is the studio's second traditionally animated series after Knights of Guinevere. The pilot episode was released on 15 May 2026 on Glitch Productions' YouTube channel, and an eight-episode season was announced on 23 October 2026.

== Premise ==
Gameoverse takes place in a universe of video game worlds; within the Gameoverse, if a world's hero successfully defeats its main villain and completes the game, that world proceeds to be annihilated. Two rival groups, the Farcade and the Syntax, struggle against each other to either prevent or facilitate this destruction, respectively. The series follows Kit, a Farcade agent who travels from world to world attempting to save them by helping each game's villains, while contending with the Syntax, who assist heroes to expedite their worlds' annihilation. (Note: Attributed to multiple sources:)

== Characters ==
Main protagonists of Gameoverse (excluding Flappers) from left to right: Kaboodle, Gobbles, and Kit

=== Main ===
- Kit (voiced by Erica Lindbeck), the catgirl heroine of a destroyed video game world who works as an agent of the Farcade, aiding villains from other worlds to prevent their destruction. (Note: Attributed to multiple sources:) According to Lindbeck, instead of a normal casting process, her casting as Kit took place after Ross O'Donovan offered her the role via a direct message on X. O'Donovan enjoyed Lindbeck's work in the Dragon Ball franchise and believed her "vocal grit" suited Kit's character.
- Kaboodle (voiced by jschlatt), Kit's brash and cynical mechanical backpack sidekick
- Gobbles (voiced by Arin Hanson), an anxious but friendly magenta "Learnosaurus" who was the hero of an in-universe children's edutainment game, Gobbles and the Learnosaurs
- Flappers (voiced by Hanson), the enthusiastic but air-headed titular hero of the in-universe game Flappers the Super Dolphin
- Warrick (voiced by Christopher Sabat), the leader of the Syntax, a group of video game villains that seek to destroy worlds and harvest their "float" energy by aiding their heroes
- Fold (voiced by Ross O'Donovan), a member of the Syntax made of paper that can take any shape
- Miss Information (voiced by Elsie Lovelock), a human member of the Syntax

=== Supporting ===
- Scratch (voiced by AmaLee), a deceased resident of Kit's world
- Orph (voiced by Vinny Vinesauce), a deceased chef from Kit's world
- Malice (voiced by Lisa Reimold), a cybernetic catgirl who is the villain of Kit's game world and a member of the Syntax, accompanied by her non-speaking companion, Mayhem
- Snappers (voiced by Michael Cusack), a fire-breathing shark who is the antagonist of Flappers the Super Dolphin
- Floaties (voiced by O'Donovan), minions of the Syntax
- Crab Girl (voiced by Matt Watson), a member of the Syntax

== Episodes ==
No.	Title	Animation directed by	Storyboarded by	Original release date
1	"Pilot"	Sean P. Cunningham	Nicole Rodriguez, Eleisiya Arocha & Li Cree	15 May 2026
While scouting the game world of Flappers the Super Dolphin, Kit, Kaboodle, and Gobbles are attacked by the Syntax, causing the group to crash-land on the planet and for Kaboodle to become separated from them. Kit and Gobbles meet Flappers, both unaware he is the game's hero, while Kaboodle meets its villain, Snappers, and trains him to defeat Flappers. Syntax agents Fold and Miss Information are sent down to stop Kit, tricking Flappers into completing the game's objectives. Kit and Gobbles discover the situation, and Kit blurts out the game world's truth in a panic, nearly triggering the destruction of the game. While Kit and Gobbles reunite with Kaboodle, Flappers, with the help of Fold, continues through the game and wins his battle against Snappers, causing the world to be destroyed. The trio escape the world alongside Flappers, while Snappers is taken to the Syntax's ship and killed when he refuses to join them. Syntax leader Warrick offers Malice and Mayhem—the villains of Kit's world—an opportunity for revenge.
2	TBA	TBA	TBA	21 May 2027
3	TBA	TBA	TBA	27 August 2027
4	TBA	TBA	TBA	29 October 2027

== Production ==
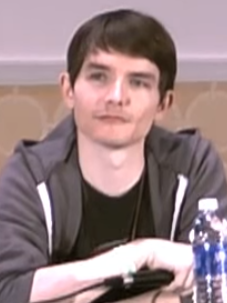
Creator and director Ross O'Donovan at MAGFest 2015

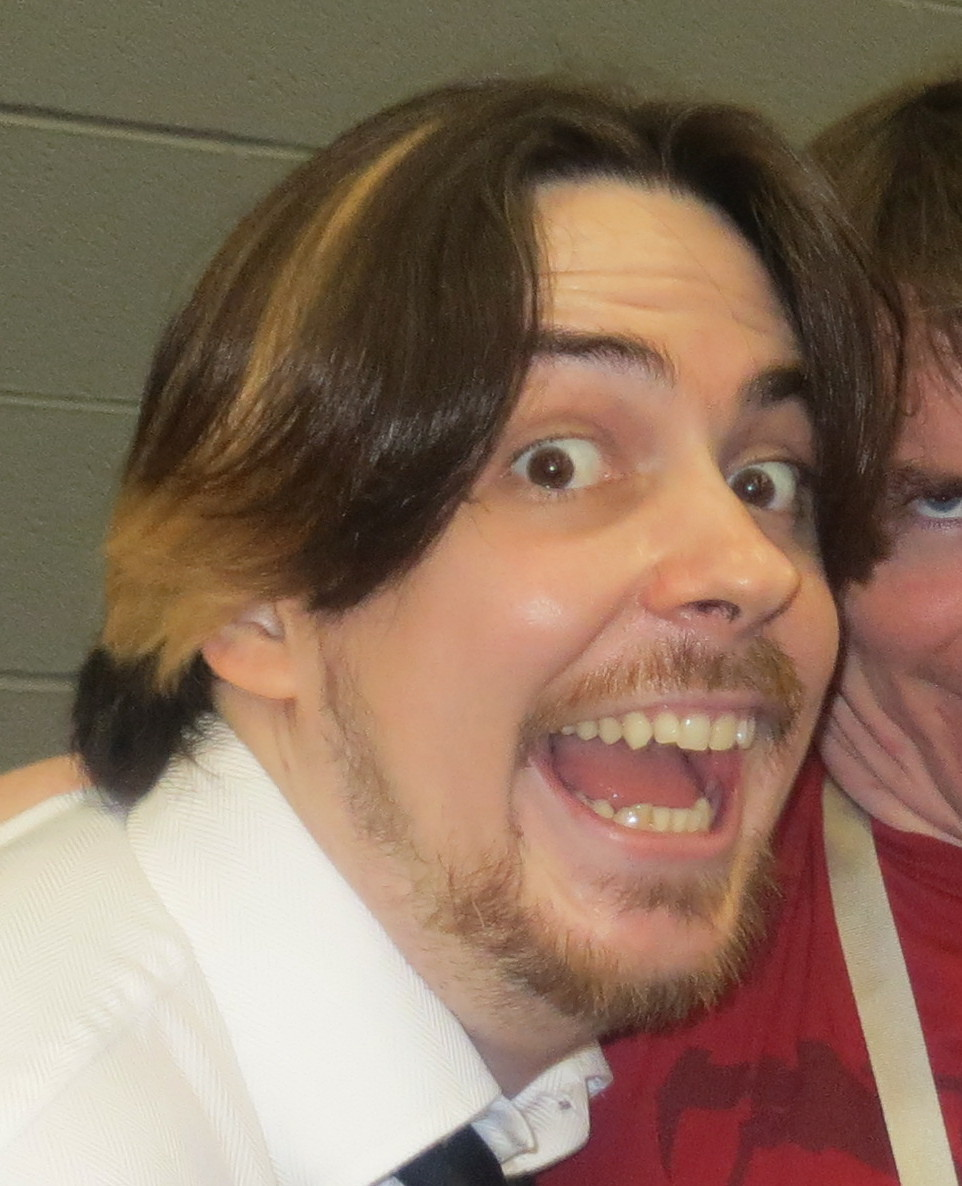
Co-writer Arin Hanson, pictured at RTX 2014

=== Background ===
Gameoverse was created by independent animator Ross O'Donovan, also known as RubberRoss, and was developed over the course of eleven years beginning in 2015. The series is derived from a 2009 web series of the same name, also created by O'Donovan. This earlier series differed from the 2026 version in many ways; it featured different characters, lower animation quality, and a simpler plot. O'Donovan posted the series to the animation website Newgrounds, where he met his friend Arin Hanson, who began helping him develop the series.

=== Development ===
Sometime between 2013 to 2015, (Note: Year varies per source. A press release published by Glitch Productions quoted O'Donovan as stating that development began in 2015. Writing for Animation Magazine, Kambole Campbell briefly noted that O'Donovan estimated the year to either be 2013 or 2014. After being asked "How about the Gameoverse reboot?" during a 2014 AMA interview hosted on Reddit, O'Donovan assured: "I'm carefully working on it right now. Don't bite your tongue!!") O'Donovan began consolidating plans for a substantially reworked version of Gameoverse. Over the following years, he produced multiple versions of what the show could be. In 2017, while visiting Los Angeles, Glitch Productions founders Luke and Kevin Lerdwichagul viewed an early animatic of the project; Kevin later described being "immediately struck by its world-building, creativity and depth". O'Donovan said that a condition he treated as non-negotiable throughout this period was that the series be produced in 2D.

In a 2026 interview, Arin Hanson stated that the team spent years pitching Gameoverse to various studios without success, and that he financed the project himself during this period. After the studio approached O'Donovan again with a commitment to 2D production, he and Hanson agreed to restart the script from scratch; Hanson described the writing process as involving "700 different rewrites and iterations".

== Release ==
In January 2026, Glitch Productions announced that it partnered with O'Donovan and Arin Hanson for full release of Gameoverse on its YouTube channel. In an announcement, CEO of Glitch Productions Kevin Lerdwichagul described the collaboration as a "natural fit with the company's indie animation mission". The first teaser trailer appeared on the studio's X account on 18 January, and a trailer for the series was released on YouTube on 23 January.

The series' pilot episode was released on 15 May 2026. The episode features music created by composers Grant Kirkhope and Jake Kaufman. Official merchandise for the series was also made. On May 27, Glitch Productions released a short 2D animated commercial for the series' merchandise on X, created by animating duo Smallbu. On 23 October 2026, Gameoverse was announced to be in production for a full season, consisting of eight episodes.

== Reception ==
=== Critical response ===
Prior to the pilot's release, Comicon.com wrote that it liked the series' premise and its parody of "1990s-era edutainment games". After pilot's release, David Kaldor of Bubbleblabber, described characters and animation of the pilot as "very engaging" but the pilot's worldbuilding as "confusing". He called the pilot a "solid start" and said he believes the series will "reach greatness" after the greenlight. Anime Superhero News wrote that although the pilot was not "groundbreaking", it was "fun for what it is", and compared the pilot to the 1994 animated TV series ReBoot.

Semyon Tryasin of 2×2 said that Gameoverse reminds him of the animated series OK K.O.! Let's Be Heroes, and that Kit and Kaboodle are reminiscent of characters from Capcom's Mega Man video game series. Poch Eulalia of Manila Bulletin said the series have confusing but intriguing premise and an "exciting feel to it" animation-wise. He also said the pilot was a success, saying it "quickly taken the Internet by storm" and is likely to be greenlit. Jason Hon of Screen Rant said that the pilot "does a terrific job of building a cast and adventure that begs to be further explored". He said the pilot has built an audience that is excited for the series' future. Marco Vito Oddo of ComicBook.com claimed that Gameoverse has established itself as "one of the most significant animation debuts of the year."

=== Viewership and cultural impact ===
Following the release of Gameoverse's pilot, it sparked significant discussion on social media, with fan art and memes about the series being made. Within a day since release, it reached 4 million views, then, in the next three days, over 10 million views, and over 20 million views in less than two weeks, surpassing the view count of Knights of Guinevere (2025). By October 2026, the pilot reached over 31 million views.
