= TRDR Pocket =

Handheld video game console

- Type: Handheld game console
- Released: May 2021
- Operating system: Android 10
- CPU: Helio P60 (Core 8 MT6771)
- Memory: 4GB DDR3-SDRAM
- Storage: 64 GB ROM, 1 SD card slot
- Display: 3.5 in, 720p Capacitive display, multi-touch support, 1000:1 colour ratio
- Controller input: 1 analog control stick, D-pad, 13 face buttons, 2 shoulder buttons, compatible with PlayStation DualShock controller and Xbox controller
- Connectivity: Wi-Fi 802.11/b/g/n/ac (2.4 GHz), Micro USB, Mini HDMI, headphone port
- Power: 4000 mAh battery
- Website: https://trdrpocket.com/

The TRDR Pocket, also marketed under the name SouljaGame, is an Android-based handheld game console released in 2021.

The console is distributed by Go Games. It has a touchscreen, a Helio P60 processor, HDMI output, 3GB of RAM, 32GB of internal storage, and 4G internet connectivity. It runs on the Android 10 operating system. It runs emulations of video games originally released on other consoles, such as the Nintendo Switch, Nintendo 3DS, PlayStation Vita, Neo Geo, Game Boy, Game Boy Color, and Game Boy Advance.

The console gained widespread coverage when American rapper Soulja Boy resold it under his own brand name, SouljaGame. Go Games said that Soulja Boy was a brand ambassador.
