= Minigore =

2009 video game

- Developer: Mountain Sheep
- Publishers: Chillingo, GameClub
- Platform: iOS
- Release: July 30, 2009
- Genres: Survival horror, action, shooter
- Modes: Single-player, multiplayer

Minigore is a 2009 survival horror action twin-stick shooter game for iOS, developed by Mountain Sheep and published by Chillingo. On December 6, 2012, a sequel, Minigore 2: Zombies, was released on multiple platforms. Minigore was not updated for iOS 11 and was removed from the App Store until returning in 2019 under publisher GameClub.

== Gameplay ==
In-game image showing the dual-stick controls.

Players control the main character, John Gore (voiced by Arin Hanson, AKA 'Egoraptor'), in a world called Hardland. Gameplay revolves around Gore shooting creatures called "furries", who are trying to kill him. A cloverleaf will generate randomly after a certain number of furry kills. Collecting three clovers will turn Gore into a minotaur, granting him invincibility and allowing him to stomp on enemies. This lasts for about 15–20 seconds. The player has three lives and accumulates points for each furry killed. There are Game Center leaderboards and achievements.

Update 3 added more playable characters, such as Enviro-Bear, Jerry Gore, Evan Hsu, Xmas Gore, Sensei Evan, Kid Gore and Santa. It also introduced a grenade launcher and upgradeable weapons, a day and night cycle, and a snowy forest level.

Update 3.5 featured Gangster Gore, Lizzy, Ninja Man and Zombieville Guy, a Kid Gore redux. Characters could now also wield dual weapons and support was added for OpenFeint 2.4.

Update 3.6 included the character Hook Champ and also added special traits for Gangster Gore, Sensei Evan and Sway's Ninja.

Update 3.7 included the character Predator Furry, Zombie Gore, and Easter Bunny. It also introduced graphical improvements to the map screen.

Update 3.8 included graphic enhancements for the Retina Display. It also featured weapon recoil effects and options to increase or decrease performance.

Update 3.9 included new furries called fur-bombs, a new hidden difficulty called "Inferno", and auto-aim.

Update 4 introduced co-op multiplayer, another character pack, changes to the encyclopedia, and some graphical upgrades.

Update 5 featured three new encyclopedia pages and several new characters, including the Penguin and the Penguin Mob, along with some bug fixes.

Update 6 featured a new character called Bike Baron.

== Reception ==
Reception

Aggregate score
Aggregator	Score
GameRankings	76.67%

Review scores
Publication	Score
GameSpot	8/10
IGN	7/10
148Apps	4/5
AppSpy	4/5
Pocket Gamer	7/10

Minigore received mainly positive reviews. It holds an aggregate score of 76.67% on GameRankings, based on six reviews.

Richard Martin of 148Apps scored the game 4 out of 5, criticizing the lack of depth in the initial release, but praising the well executed core gameplay; "It's really fun, no learning curve whatsoever, it looks good, and it will definitely appeal to the iPhone's A.D.D. audience." AppSpy's Dave Flodine also scored it 4 out of 5, again finding the game had a lack of depth but was solid in and of itself; "The presentation is of a high quality, but the gameplay never really ramps up enough to be overwhelming." GameSpot's Chris Reed scored it 8 out of 10, making similar observations as 148Appps and AppSpy; "Minigore doesn't have a ton of depth, but the core game provides stylish, fun shooting action that leaves you wanting more."

Pocket Gamer's Jon Jordan scored it 7 out of 10, praising its "great graphics and audio," but criticizing the lack of content, which he assumed "will arrive in future updates." IGN's Matt Casamassina also scored it 7 out of 10. He praised the artwork and in-game humor, but called the game "a very straightforward shooter without any genuine surprises [...] The experience is so straightforward that you will inevitably be left wanting more unless the simple promise of the highest score is enough to keep you shooting the same enemies on the same stage endlessly." As with Jon Jordan, he expressed the hope that future updates would add some depth to the game.
