= A Hat in Time =

2017 video game

- Developer: Gears for Breakfast
- Publisher: Humble Bundle (Note: PC versions were self-published by Gears for Breakfast)
- Director: Jonas Kaerlev
- Composer: Pascal Michael Stiefel
- Engine: Unreal Engine 3
- Platforms: macOS; Nintendo Switch; PlayStation 4; Windows; Xbox One
- Release: macOS, Windows: WW: October 5, 2017; PlayStation 4: NA: December 5, 2017; EU: December 6, 2017; Xbox One: WW: December 6, 2017; Nintendo Switch: WW: October 18, 2019
- Genre: Platform
- Modes: Single-player, multiplayer

A Hat in Time is a 2017 platform game developed by Danish game studio Gears for Breakfast and published by Humble Bundle. The game was developed using Unreal Engine 3 and funded through a Kickstarter campaign, which nearly doubled its fundraising goals within its first two days. The game was self-published for macOS and Windows in October 2017, and by Humble Bundle for the PlayStation 4 and Xbox One consoles two months later. A version for the Nintendo Switch was released in October 2019.

The game centers around Hat Kid, an alien girl trying to get back to her home by recovering lost "Time Pieces", an in-game collectible. The gameplay consists of running through an open world environment by platforming, dodging obstacles, and obtaining collectibles. It is inspired by earlier 3D platformers such as Super Mario 64, Banjo-Kazooie, Spyro the Dragon and Psychonauts. It has been favorably compared to classic platformers and has been considered an indie success after the long decline of platforming games. There also have been several DLC expansions with different modes and custom levels as well as online multiplayer. The PC version of the game allows the use of mods through the Steam Workshop.

== Gameplay ==
A Hat in Time is a platform game set in an open world environment and played from a third-person perspective. The gameplay style has been described by several editors to be similar to Nintendo 64 platformers such as Super Mario 64 and Banjo-Kazooie. The player travels between four open levels (along with a fifth linear level and two extra levels via downloadable content), which can be freely explored without time limits. The player can collect various items, solve puzzles, and use an umbrella (or other cosmetic options via downloadable content) to combat enemies. The primary objective is to collect Time Pieces, 56 of which can be found in the game, which unlock additional levels as more are collected. After being defeated, the enemies drop "Pons", currency that can be used to unlock additional challenges and purchase badges that increase Hat Kid's abilities. The player can collect Yarn Balls in each level, which can be stitched into new hats to wear. Each hat grants Hat Kid a different ability, such as a faster sprint or brewing explosive potions. Other collectibles include "Relics", which can be used to unlock "Time Rift" bonus levels, and "Rift Tokens", which can be exchanged at a machine for bonus materials such as music remixes and additional cosmetics. Initial actions taken earlier in the game have an effect on later levels, as the main character revisits each area several times before the game is finished.

=== Death Wish ===
Death Wish is a challenge mode that was released with the Seal the Deal downloadable content (DLC) pack in September 2018. This mode comprises various challenges that use already existing levels. The player interacts with the Snatcher, a contract-obsessed ghost who first appears in the third chapter of the base game. The player takes on a challenge to earn up to three stamps upon completion, each related to a different component of the challenge. If the player fails three times they can activate "Peace and Tranquility" which will make that task easier, but it will not always allow them to activate it for challenges with a limit of lives. There are 111 Death Wish stamps, and 114 with the Nyakuza Metro DLC.

=== Vanessa's Curse ===
A new multiplayer mode called "Vanessa's Curse" was released on November 27, 2021. This mode features a competition within a large mansion between the Snatcher and Vanessa. All players will start on the Snatcher's team, where they must collect a certain number of crowns hidden throughout the mansion before time runs out. Eventually, Vanessa will curse one of the players. Any cursed players will immediately change sides and can no longer collect crowns. While on Vanessa's team, the goal is to curse all the other players by touching them. The Snatcher and Vanessa will occasionally provide power-ups or make the mission easier for the players if their team is losing, but they will affect both teams if they are even. The round ends if the required number of crowns are collected, if the timer runs out, or if all the players are cursed. If time runs out or if the players manage to collect enough crowns, Snatcher wins, but if all the players are cursed, then Vanessa wins.

== Plot ==
A Hat in Time follows Hat Kid, a little alien girl wearing a top hat trying to return to her home world via spaceship. While on her journey, she passes over a planet, and a member of the planet's Mafia comes to collect a toll for the Mafia Town government. When Hat Kid refuses to pay, the Mafia man busts the spaceship door open, causing Hat Kid and all of her "Time Pieces", magical hourglasses that power her ship, to fall to the planet below. Hat Kid lands in Mafia Town and meets Mustache Girl, a local troublemaker who hates "bad guys". Mustache Girl agrees to look for the missing Time Pieces in exchange for Hat Kid's help fighting the Mafia, and the two defeat the Mafia Boss. When Mustache Girl realizes the Time Pieces can rewind time, she wants to use them to become a crime-fighting time traveler, but Hat Kid refuses, as she is aware that messing with time is dangerous. Angered by this refusal, Mustache Girl declares the two enemies and sets off to find the Time Pieces on her own.

Hat Kid ventures across the planet looking for Time Pieces, encountering many foes and subsequently befriending them all. These include DJ Grooves and the Conductor, two rival bird directors competing for a movie award; the Nomads, a group of mountain villagers infected by a dangerous plague; and the Snatcher, a malevolent spirit who steals her soul to force her to do his bidding and defeat his former lover, the featureless witch Vanessa. The game's DLC adds new scenarios in which Hat Kid searches for Time Pieces: in "Seal the Deal", Hat Kid works for the Walrus Captain on the Arctic Cruise ocean liner, while in "Nyakuza Metro", she is pressed into service by the Nyakuza crime boss Empress, who later places a bounty on her head. One DLC reveals that the Snatcher and Vanessa were once a prince and princess, but when the princess thought the prince was cheating on her as a result of a misunderstanding, she imprisoned the prince. Over time, they turned into corrupted beings; the prince became the Snatcher and the princess became Vanessa. Mustache Girl exploits Hat Kid's absence to break into her ship and steals the collected Time Pieces, using them to turn the planet into a fiery inferno where her word is law. Hat Kid confronts her, but Mustache Girl uses the Time Pieces to open a time rift and make herself all-powerful.

The enemies Hat Kid has fought come to her aid in battle, some sacrificing themselves so that Hat Kid can use their dropped Heart Pon healing collectibles to power herself up. Hat Kid finally defeats Mustache Girl and uses the Time Pieces to reset the timeline, restoring the planet to normal and reviving all those who were lost. The player can then choose whether Hat Kid ultimately offers a Time Piece to Mustache Girl or not. Though her former foes are sad to see her leave, Hat Kid restores the Time Pieces to her vault and resumes her voyage home. In a post-credits scene, Hat Kid is shown sleeping in bed surrounded by toys resembling the other characters.

== Development ==
The initial idea for A Hat in Time was started by director Jonas Kærlev, who graduated with a master's degree in computer science at Aalborg University in Denmark. He launched the project as an answer to his feeling of an ongoing shortage of 3D platformers, specifically developed by Nintendo. Some inspirations include Psychonauts, Spyro the Dragon and Banjo-Kazooie. In an interview with Polygon, Kærlev revealed that he and Gears for Breakfast initially did not expect the Kickstarter success A Hat in Time eventually received. Kærlev thought that there would be little demand for the game due to Donkey Kong 64's effects on the genre, which he perceived as overwhelming the player with too much collecting. Development for the game started in August 2012 and was planned for a Q2 2013 release but was significantly delayed. At the start of development, Kærlev was the sole developer of the game but over time the development grew into Gears for Breakfast, a team spanning four countries and entirely volunteer-based. Through the Kickstarter campaign the game surpassed the initial goal of $30,000 with a final total of $296,360. In July 2013, it was announced that the game had been greenlit for release via Steam. The soundtrack was mostly composed by Pascal Michael Stiefel, with several guest composers such as Grant Kirkhope contributing additional tracks to the game.

A port of the game for Nintendo's Wii U console was in the developer's minds ever since the Kickstarter's announcement, considering that the game is heavily inspired by Nintendo-published platformers, but actual development did not materialize. Upon various requests for it to be ported for the Nintendo Switch, Gears For Breakfast initially claimed on Twitter that such a port will not happen, which was met with mixed reactions. However, during Gamescom in August 2018, a Nintendo Switch port was confirmed and it was later released on October 18, 2019. The two DLCs released for PC were also ported to the Switch version at a later date.

=== Downloadable content (DLC) ===
In March 2018, an update added mod support via Steam Workshop.

The first DLC, Seal the Deal, was released for the PC version on September 13, 2018, and was available at no charge for 24 hours after its release. The DLC was later released alongside the game's Nintendo Switch launch on October 18, 2019. It added the new Arctic Cruise chapter, a new challenge mode known as "Death Wish", six additional Time Rift stages, as well as new cosmetics and photo mode filters. In addition, local splitscreen co-op was also added, featuring the new character Bow Kid.

The second DLC, Nyakuza Metro + Online Party, was announced on April 25, 2019, and released on May 10 on PC. It was released for the Nintendo Switch on November 21, 2019. Its new, titular chapter is set in a Japan-inspired underground city, where Hat Kid becomes a member of a cat-themed street gang. A baseball bat weapon is introduced, as well as new badges, cosmetics, and stickers (which can be used as emotes and used to decorate the player's weapon). A new online multiplayer mode was also introduced, where groups of up to 50 players can play in a single world at once. Online Party is only available through Steam and was "one of the first games to premiere" using Valve's Steam Networking API 2.0. The DLC is available at no charge for those that had backed the game's Kickstarter campaign.

In November 2020, Gears for Breakfast announced on Twitter that both Seal the Deal and Nyakuza Metro would be released on PlayStation 4 and Xbox One in Q1 2021. On March 31, 2021, both DLC packs were released on those platforms, with support for 60 FPS when playing on PlayStation 5 or Xbox Series X/S using backwards compatibility.

== Reception ==
Reception

Aggregate score
Aggregator	Score
Metacritic	PC: 79/100; PS4: 79/100; NS: 76/100; XONE: 74/100

Review scores
Publication	Score
Destructoid	8.5/10
Eurogamer	Recommended
Game Informer	8/10
GameSpot	7/10
IGN	8/10
Nintendo Life	8/10
Nintendo World Report	7/10
PC Gamer (US)	86/100
Push Square	6/10

The PC, PlayStation 4 and Nintendo Switch versions of A Hat in Time received "generally favorable" reviews from critics, aside from the Xbox One version receiving "mixed or average" reviews, according to review aggregator website Metacritic.

Chris Carter from Destructoid gave the game an 8.5 out of 10, calling it an "impressive effort with a few noticeable problems holding it back." PC Gamer's Dominic Tarason rated the game 86/100 saying, "Some scuff-marks aside, A Hat in Time is a creative, playful, and polished tribute to a genre that doesn't get nearly enough love on PC." In the Game Informer review, Kyle Hilliard stated the "dated PlayStation 2 era" graphics are the game's weakest element, but praised the gameplay, sound design and music, awarding the game 8 out of 10.

=== Sales ===
Two weeks after its release, A Hat in Time had sold 50,000 copies. By July 2018, the game had sold over 500,000 copies. By December 2018, the game had sold over 1 million copies.

=== Accolades ===
The game was nominated for "Best PC Game" in Destructoid's Game of the Year Awards 2017, for "Best Platformer" in IGN's Best of 2017 Awards, and for "Game, Original Family" at the National Academy of Video Game Trade Reviewers Awards.
