= Did You Know Gaming? =

Video game-based blog and YouTube channel

DidYouKnowGaming?
- Website type: Gaming blog
- Available in: English; Spanish; Portuguese
- Owner: Shane Gill
- Website: didyouknowgaming.com
- Commercial: Yes
- Launched: May 14, 2012
- Current status: Active

YouTube information
- Channel: DidYouKnowGaming?
- Years active: 2012–present
- Genre: Gaming
- Subscribers: 2.38 million
- Views: 648 million
- Last updated: November 13th, 2025

Did You Know Gaming? (abbreviated DYKG) is an American video game–focused blog and web series which launched in May 2012. The site features video content focusing on video game related trivia and facts, with occasional journalistic investigations into gaming's lost secrets and forgotten products. Each video is narrated by a number of popular internet personalities and industry professionals including JonTron, Arin Hanson, Smooth McGroove, David Hayter and more.

Since the website's launch, it has been featured on numerous major news and gaming outlets including Huffington Post, MCV, Game Informer, MTV, Nerdist, and the Houston Press.

In 2017, Did You Know Gaming? opened a second channel, called DYKG Clips (formerly Did You Know Gaming? 2).

== History ==
The site launched on May 14, 2012, by Shane Gill who came up with the idea for a trivia focused website based on gaming after being inspired by a number of Facebook trivia groups. By July 2012, the official Facebook page had reached nearly 20,000 fans in under eight weeks. As of January 2022, the official YouTube channel has currently over 2,300,000 subscribers and over 580 million views.

On January 25, 2014, Did You Know Gaming partnered with a relaunched Normal Boots, a collaborative website for hosting gaming themed content created by Jon Jafari and Austin Hargrave. A spin-off series' has also been created on the channel "The Film Theorists" called Did You Know Movies. It has long since moved to the NormalBoots YouTube channel in where the majority of the original videos were reworked.

On July 7, 2017, Did You Know Gaming? announced a new channel, featuring content created by Dazz, creator of The Spriters Resource and the Region Locked series, alongside Greg who also works on Region Locked. The channel features a more off-the-cuff style primarily focused around providing additional content to complement the main channel. The channel hosted its own version of two of the channels main shows, Did You Know Gaming? Extra and Region Locked Light. As of April 2021, the second channel has over 160,000 subscribers and more than 4.1 million views.

On November 21, 2017, they announced that Region Locked Light would be cancelled and that Did You Know Gaming? Extra would be moved to the main channel. They, as of the date, had almost no plans for the channel. One of their ideas was using the channel to promote smaller trivia and gaming channels.

On June 29, 2020, they announced Did You Know Gaming? 2 would be rebranded as DYKG Clips which compiles clips from Did You Know Gaming? and Did You Know Gaming Extra.

On April 23, 2022, they announced they would release the one-hour videos from DYKG Clips as podcasts.

On April 28, 2023, the channel was hacked by cryptocurrency scammers.

== Content ==
The site releases videos presenting trivia based on different franchises. Series which have been covered are Star Fox, Pikmin, Super Smash Bros. Metroid and many more. One specific series called Easter Egg Hunting looks at secrets and Easter Eggs found in games based on a particular show or in a specific game such as South Park, Doctor Who and Metal Gear Solid.

== VGFacts ==
VGFacts is a sister website of Did You Know Gaming? which launched in March 2013 and also features gaming related trivia. Created in partnership with The Spriters Resource, the site features trivia covering thousands of games, series and consoles as well as articles discussing various topics, including contributions from game publisher Konami.

== Reception ==
The site has received generally positive reception from critics.

CEO of Destructoid, Hamza Aziz, has praised the site saying "The Did You Know Gaming series is a pretty wonderful look at the lesser known facts of your favorite videogames."

Steve Napierski, author of the webcomic series Dueling Analogs, has posted about Did You Know Gaming? multiple times saying that "Not sure if you've noticed from the amount of Did You Know Gaming? videos I have reposted on Dueling Analogs, but I am definitely a fan of them."
