= Steve Kardynal =

American YouTuber and comedian (born 1990)

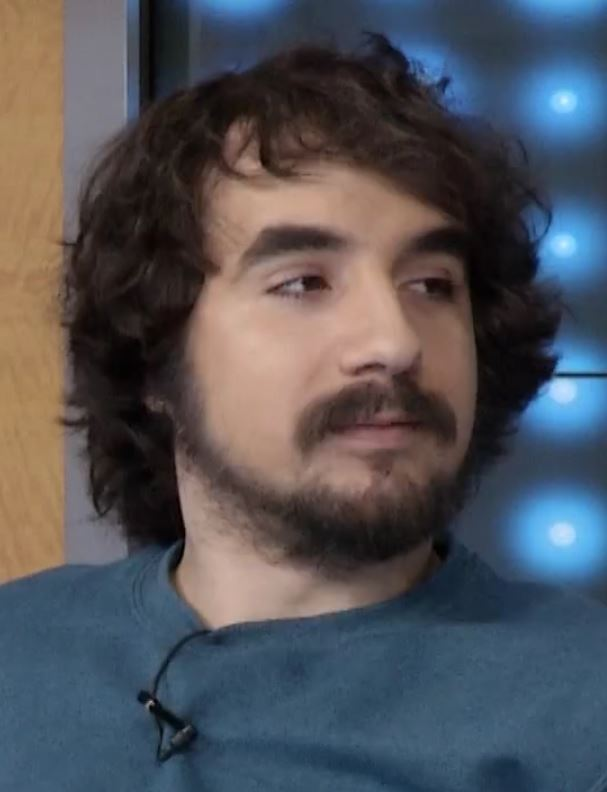
- Kardynal in 2014
- Born: Stephen Kardynal; January 7, 1990 (age 36); Macomb Township, Michigan, U.S.
- Occupations: Comedian, YouTuber

YouTube information
- Channel: SteveKardynal
- Years active: 2009–present
- Genres: Comedy; parodies; lip syncing
- Subscribers: 4.91 million
- Views: 578 million
- Last updated: October 21, 2025

Stephen Kardynal (born January 7, 1990) is an American comedian and YouTuber from Michigan.

== Career ==
Kardynal has produced a series of Chatroulette videos, where he shows himself often dressing up as a woman and lip syncing and dancing to pop songs, along with the reactions of unsuspecting people who connect with him on Chatroulette. Songs he has covered on Chatroulette are "Call Me Maybe", "Wrecking Ball", "Telephone" (which was featured on NBC's The Tonight Show with Jay Leno), "All I Want for Christmas Is You", "Peacock" and "Let It Go".

Kardynal has also produced the "Songs In Real Life" series, where people in different scenarios describe what is happening to them via singing while the song is playing and editing out their voice during relevant song lyrics.

In 2014, Kardynal's YouTube Channel was listed on New Media Rockstars Top 100 Channels, ranked at #46.

== See also ==
- List of YouTube personalities
