= Game Grumps =

Let's Play web series

- Current title card since 2018, featuring caricatures of hosts Dan Avidan (left) and Arin Hanson (right)
- Genre: Let's Play; Improv comedy
- Created by: Arin Hanson; Jon Jafari
- Presented by: Arin Hanson (2012–present); Jon Jafari (2012–2013); Dan Avidan (2013–present)
- Theme music composer: Arin Hanson
- Country of origin: United States
- Original language: English
- No. of episodes: 9,300+

Production
- Editor: Tony MacDowell (2021–present)
- Running time: 10–75 minutes

Original release
- Release: July 18, 2012 – present

Related
- Ten Minute Power Hour

Game Grumps (stylized in pascal case) is an American Let's Play web series hosted by Arin Hanson (2012–present) and Dan Avidan (2013–present). Created in 2012 by Hanson and Jon Jafari, the series centers around its hosts playing video games. Jafari left the show in 2013 to focus on his own YouTube webseries, JonTron, with Avidan succeeding his role.

Since Jafari's departure, the channel has expanded to include many other hosts, besides the main two, who have floated in and out of the channel over time as a part of spin-off shows. Those include Ross O'Donovan, Barry Kramer, Suzy Berhow, and Brian Wecht, as well as various guest hosts. As of 27 September 2025, Game Grumps has over 5.44 million subscribers and over 7.05 billion total video views. Game Grumps have also developed and published three video games—Dream Daddy: A Dad Dating Simulator, Soviet Jump Game, and Homebody.

== Format ==
Episodes usually consist of two hosts or more playing a video game, featuring their commentary (often humorous), experience with (and opinions of) the chosen game, as well as related and unrelated discussions, along with stories from their lives. These commentaries often feature voice characterizations performed by the hosts, especially in the case of Hanson and Avidan. Many of the displayed games are sent in to the Grumps' PO box in Glendale, California, by fans.

Secondarily to this is the Ten Minute Power Hour, in which The Grumps often are made to perform tasks, play classic children’s games, or play with an assortment of toys with one theme. These tasks are most often done without prior knowledge of what they will be performing. Occasionally, the main topic of the episode will be food, in which case they often (intentionally or unintentionally) eat an uncomfortable amount of food, in both quantity and variety of often sickening flavors. These are most often showcased upon the secondary Game Grumps channel, The Grumps.

== History ==
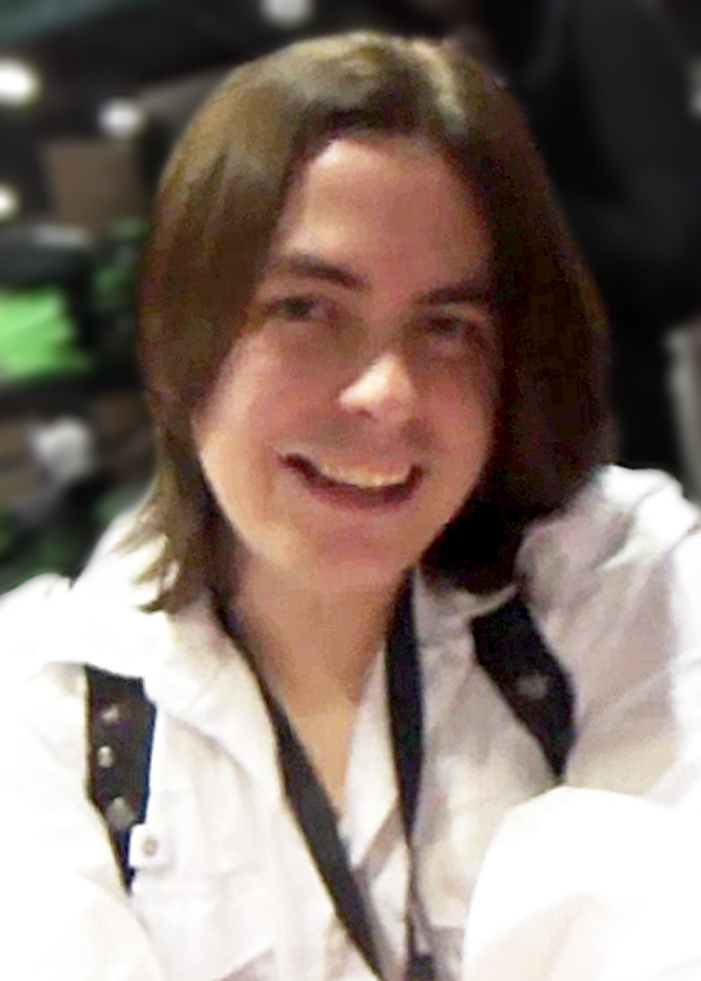
Arin Hanson (pictured in 2011) and Jon Jafari created Game Grumps in 2012 and hosted it together until 2013.

Game Grumps was created by Jon "JonTron" Jafari and Arin "Egoraptor" Hanson on July 10, 2012, and began with a video of the two playing Kirby Super Star uploaded on July 18, 2012 to video sharing site YouTube. According to Jafari and Hanson, the idea for the show came about when the two were arguing over whether or not the character Wolf from the fighting game Super Smash Bros. Brawl was too similar to the character Fox in terms of their fighting styles. After animator Ross O'Donovan told the duo about their tendency to be "grumpy" with each other over video games, Hanson came up with the idea of a podcast revolving around this concept, though the show ultimately became a video series on YouTube rather than a podcast. In September 2012, Barry Kramer was brought onto the show as an editor. Hanson and Jafari worked on the show together until June 25, 2013, when Jafari announced he would be leaving the show due to desires to focus on his own show. Many fans were upset by Jafari's departure from Game Grumps, with many expressing disappointment in the decision's last-minute announcement, as well as the channel's decision to announce the beginning of Steam Train on the same day. After Jafari's departure, Ninja Sex Party vocalist Dan Avidan succeeded him as co-host of the main show. Avidan also joined animator Ross O'Donovan as co-host of the show Steam Train where both play PC games. This expanded the channel's output to three videos a day: two standard Game Grumps episodes and a single Steam Train episode. Steam Train later expanded to include Hanson as a co-host at times, as well as featuring one of the group's editors, Barry Kramer, and Hanson's wife Suzy Berhow.

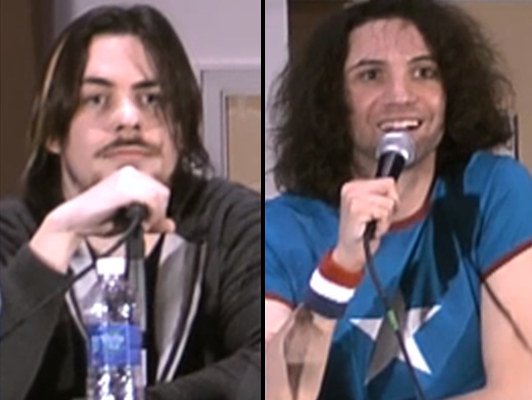
The current hosts of Game Grumps, Arin Hanson (left) and Dan Avidan (right), in 2015

In December 2013, Kramer and Berhow began hosting Table Flip, where they dress in Victorian/19th century American period clothing and play tabletop games, such as card games, board games, and tile-based games with other YouTube personalities. The series was professionally produced by Polaris, with seven cameras and extensive editing in post-production to fit the content to the show's 45 to 60 minute format on Polaris's website rather than the Game Grumps YouTube channel. The final episode of Table Flip aired on October 14, 2016. In November 2014, Kevin Abernathy was hired to assist Kramer with video editing and production. Although Abernathy took on editing for most of the series, Kramer continued to edit Steam Train. Since Abernathy's departure from the show in mid-2016, Kramer, Ryan Magee, and Matt Watson had taken the editing duties.

In January 2015, to celebrate reaching two million subscribers, a new show called Grumpcade was launched, featuring any combination of co-hosts playing console games. The show also features guest YouTube personalities, including game critics ProJared, The Completionist, and YouTuber Markiplier. Shortly after, in February 2015, GrumpOut, a channel dedicated to recreational and live-action video projects, was created. In November 2015, Avidan's Ninja Sex Party bandmate Brian Wecht officially joined the team, leaving behind his career as a theoretical physicist.

In February 2016, it was announced that Avidan and Hanson would appear at Hollywood Improv for a special performance of Game Grumps Live on March 30 and 31. Later, in April 2016, it was announced that Avidan and Hanson would appear at Levity Live in Nyack, New York for more performances of Game Grumps Live on April 29 and 30.

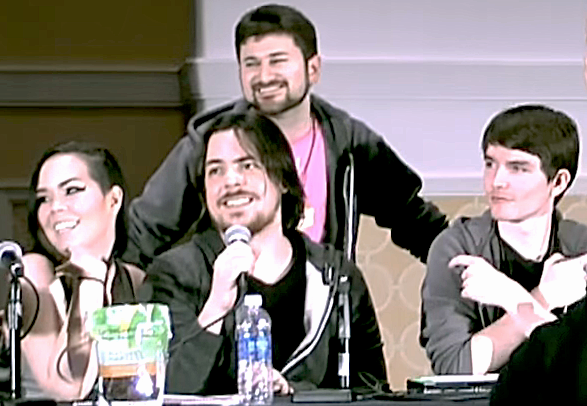
Suzy Berhow (left), Arin Hanson (center, bottom), Barry Kramer (center, top), and Ross O'Donovan, pictured in 2015, were all members of Game Grumps.

On January 6, 2017, it was announced that the show's middle slot would no longer upload on a consistent schedule. While Steam Train and Grumpcade were not canceled, the format was changed so that they would be released only on an occasional basis. A few substitute shows were created to fill the empty slot on certain days. These include Doodle Doods, an artistic show hosted by fellow animators and YouTubers O'Donovan and Chris O'Neill (OneyNG), The G Club, a media-centric podcast show, and Dragons in Places, an audio-only podcast detailing a Dungeons & Dragons campaign.

In December 2017, Kramer announced that he would be departing from the show to focus on his own pursuits; he was replaced by Ryan Magee and Matt Watson.

Since 2015, Game Grumps has also been developing an animated series titled Gameoverse, created by O'Donovan. By June 21, 2017, the development team had expanded to include writer Chad Quandt, concept artist Ashley Swaby, and story artist Krooked_Glasses.

== Personnel ==
Over time, Game Grumps has accumulated a variety of hosts, editors and other personnel since Jafari's departure in 2013, some of which are not mentioned below. All members have appeared in various roles outside of their main position.

=== Main hosts ===
Hosts of the main Game Grumps series.

Current

- Arin Hanson – Main host (2012–present); Steam Rolled host (2013–2016); 10 Minute Power Hour host (2018–present)
- Dan Avidan – Main host (2013–present); Steam Train host (2013–2014); Steam Rolled host (2013); 10 Minute Power Hour host (2018–present)

Former

- Jon Jafari – Main host (2012–2013); primary editor (2012)

=== Other members ===
Official members according to the Game Grumps in various videos. These members have hosted various shows of their own, or have made appearances in Grumpcade, Steam Train and other series.

Current

- Suzanne (Suzy) Berhow – Steam Rolled host (2013–2016); Table Flip host (2013–2016); various roles (2013–present)
- Brian Wecht – Various roles (2015–present)

Former

- Ross O'Donovan – Steam Train host (2013–2018); Steam Rolled host (2013–2016); various roles (2013–2020), Mario Maker level producer (2015–2020)
- Barry Kramer – Primary editor (2012–2015); Steam Rolled host (2013–2016); Table Flip host (2013–2016); The G Club host (2017); various roles (2012–2017)
- Allie Jean – PR manager, producer, occasionally appears on Game Grumps episodes (2018–2023)

=== Primary editors ===
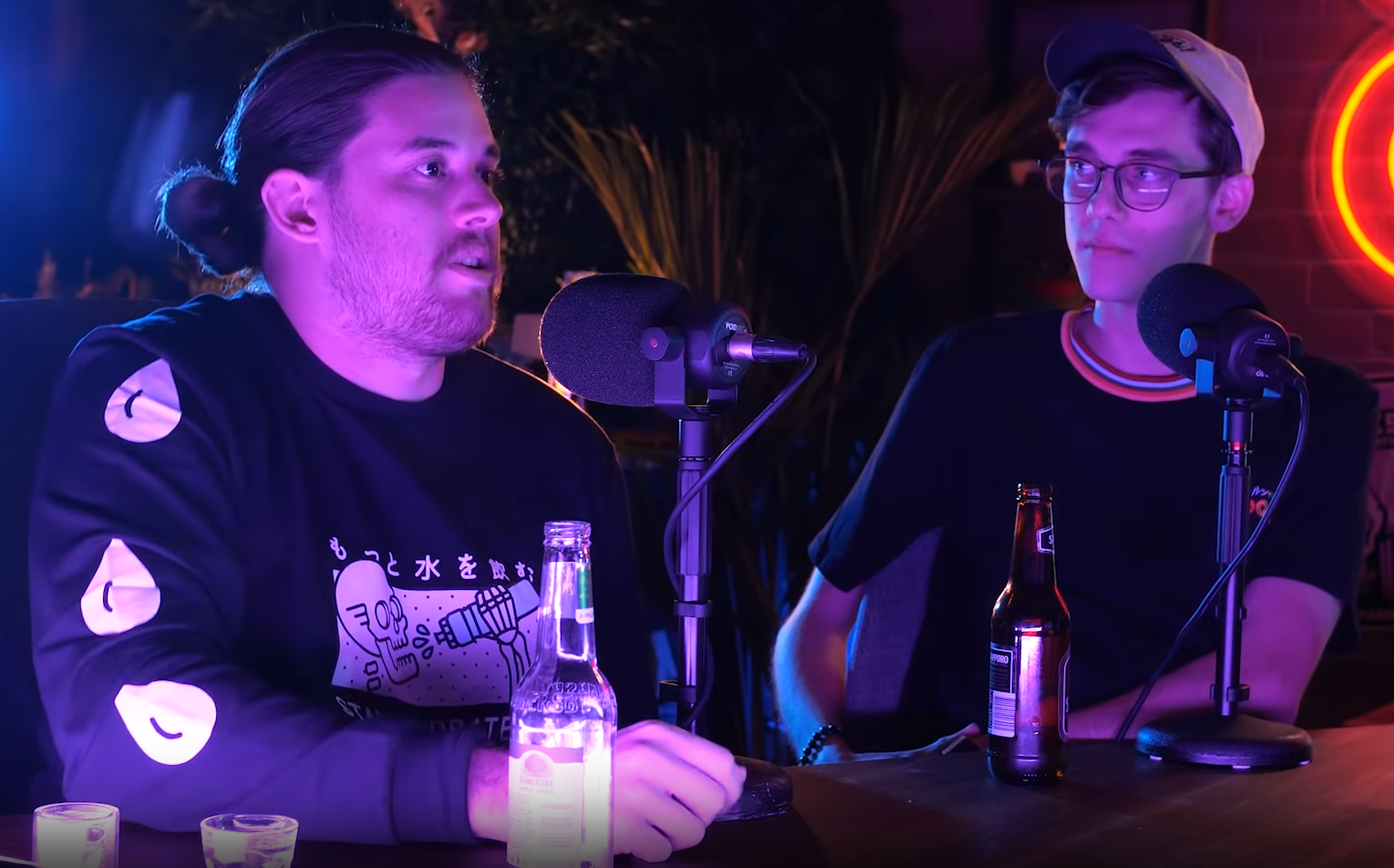
Former editors Ryan Magee and Matt Watson pictured in 2019

Aside from Jon Jafari and Barry Kramer, Game Grumps has had multiple editors who were not considered official members, but made occasional appearances in videos.

Current

- Ben Perry – Primary editor (2019–present); various roles (2019–present)

Former

- Kevin Abernathy – Primary editor (2015–2016); various roles (2015–2016)
- Ryan Magee – Primary editor (2016–2019); various roles (2016–2019)
- Matt Watson – Primary editor (2016–2019); various roles (2016–2019)

== Other ventures ==
=== Non-gaming content ===
In recent years, Game Grumps have expanded to content that is either only tangentially or not at all related to video games. These include live-action comedy shows 10 Minute Power Hour and Good Content, Good Game, a YouTube Premium exclusive show, and two Game Grumps-published books, Ghost Hunters Adventure Club and the Secret of the Grande Chateau and Ghost Hunters Adventure Club and the Express Train to Nowhere, supposedly written by Hanson's estranged uncle Dr. Cecil H. H. Mills; Mills is physically portrayed by Hanson under "old man" makeup. The first book was released on March 10, 2020, and published by Permuted Press. The audiobook version of Ghost Hunters Adventure Club and the Secret of the Grande Chateau was released on Audible on August 19, 2020, narrated by Hanson in character as Dr. Cecil H. H. Mills. The second book in the series, Ghost Hunters Adventure Club and the Express Train to Nowhere, was published on June 7, 2022, accompanied by its own theme song.

=== Philanthropy ===
In late 2013, the Game Grumps put various games, of which they had received multiple copies, on eBay for auction, with all the proceeds going to the children's charity Child's Play. After the auctions ended, they had raised a total of over $7,000.

In June 2015, a 5-episode miniseries was released called Guild Grumps. O'Donovan mentored Hanson, Avidan, Kramer and Berhow in a 5-day race to advance from Level 90 to Level 100 in World of Warcraft. Each participant had $1,000 to donate to a charity of their choice, if they reached the goal. If they did not, their donation would be split between those who won. In the end, O'Donovan was the sole winner, and, combined with the participants' distributed funds, donated $5,000 to cancer research.

As of 2015, Game Grumps had raised over $70,000 by hosting charity livestreams on Twitch.

On February 17, 2018, Game Grumps held a 6-hour livestream on Twitch in which they played several games, including Mad Max, Half-Life 2, Fallout, and Overwatch, raising around $77,000 for the Crisis Text Line. Later in the same year, Game Grumps did another 6-hour livestream to raise money for Camp Kesem, raising over $37,000.

On June 4, 2020, in wake of the George Floyd protests and Black Lives Matter movement, Game Grumps announced that they had donated a total of $20,000 to charities that support Black-owned Businesses, Black LGBTQ+ support groups, and various bail funds to assist arrested protesters.

=== Promotions ===
In 2013, before Jafari's departure to work on his own JonTron series, Jafari and Hanson appeared in a promotional video for the Warner Bros. Pictures movie Pacific Rim produced by Polaris. The video also featured other internet personalities Jesse Cox, Brooke "Dodger" Lawson, Mike Lamond and John Bain. In the video they played new recruits under training by "The Lieutenant Commander" played by Robert Kazinsky.

In 2015, the Game Grumps were featured in the official reveal trailer for the Shovel Knight Amiibo figure.

=== Video game development ===
On June 13, 2017, Game Grumps announced on their official X account that they were developing a video game of their own. A teaser trailer for the game was released on June 18, 2017, titled Dream Daddy: A Dad Dating Simulator. After some delays, Dream Daddy was released on Steam on July 20, 2017 on both Windows and MacOS. The game was later ported to the PlayStation 4 and Nintendo Switch. On the day of its release, Hanson stated that Game Grumps was now a video game development studio.

In November 2019, the channel posted two videos covering games for the Dendy video game console. It was followed by a video on December 3, 2019, where Arin Hanson "discovered" a multiplayer battle royale game for the console. The following day it was revealed to be an elaborate promotion for Soviet Jump Game, the second video game to be published by Game Grumps, with a trailer released that same day. The game was released for free on Steam on July 17, 2020.

On June 1, 2023, Game Grumps released their third video game on Steam, Homebody, a psychological horror game published by Rogue Games.

== Legacy and influence ==
The show and its hosts have since been referenced in a number of video games such as DLC Quest and The Angry Video Game Nerd Adventures. Virtual avatars of Hanson and Avidan are also featured, and voiced by themselves, in House Party.

In the third issue of the 2016 Doctor Who Ninth Doctor comic series, an alien girl is seen wearing a "Hey I'm Grump! I'm Not So Grump!" shirt.

A specially modified version of the demo for The Stanley Parable was played on the channel's side show Steam Train which addressed two of the show's hosts, Dan Avidan and Ross O'Donovan.

In an interview with Entertainment Weekly, Olympic swimmer Tom Shields said that Game Grumps was one of his favorite shows and that he watched it "almost daily." He mentioned that the show's hosts "helped him normalize a lot of things. It's kind of a new phenomenon in his life."

In 2021, Game Grumps was cited as an example of a "comfort creator" in an article from The New York Times.

=== Guest Grumps ===
Guest Grumps is a spin-off series in which each episode features a special guest star. The following list is in order from their first appearance on the show.

- Grant Kirkhope
- Markiplier
- Steve-O
- Jacob Anderson
- Claudio Sanchez
- Rob and Patricia Schneider
- Brent Weinbach
- Finn Wolfhard
- Thomas Middleditch and Kumail Nanjiani
- Michael Ian Black
- Paul F. Tompkins and Tim Baltz
- Dan Harmon
- Michael Ornstein
- Rhett & Link
- "Weird Al" Yankovic
- Jamie Lee Curtis and her daughter, Ruby
- Brian Regan
- Ben Schwartz
- Michelle Visage and her daughter, Lillie Case
- Super Guitar Bros
- TheOdd1sOut
- Insym
- RubberNinja
- Jaiden Animations
- Flamingo
- Wilbur Soot
- Matthew Mercer
- Value Select
- Skweezy Jibbs
- The Anime Man, CDawgVA, and Gigguk of Trash Taste
- Jacksepticeye
- Jirard "The Completionist" Khalil
- Sneegsnag and Ranboo
- CrankGameplays
- Roberta Williams
- Rav

== Awards and nominations ==
Awards and nominations for Game Grumps
Year	Award Show	Category	Result	Ref.
2013	Shorty Awards	Gaming	Nominated	
2016	Shorty Awards	Gaming	Nominated	
