= Steel Panther discography =

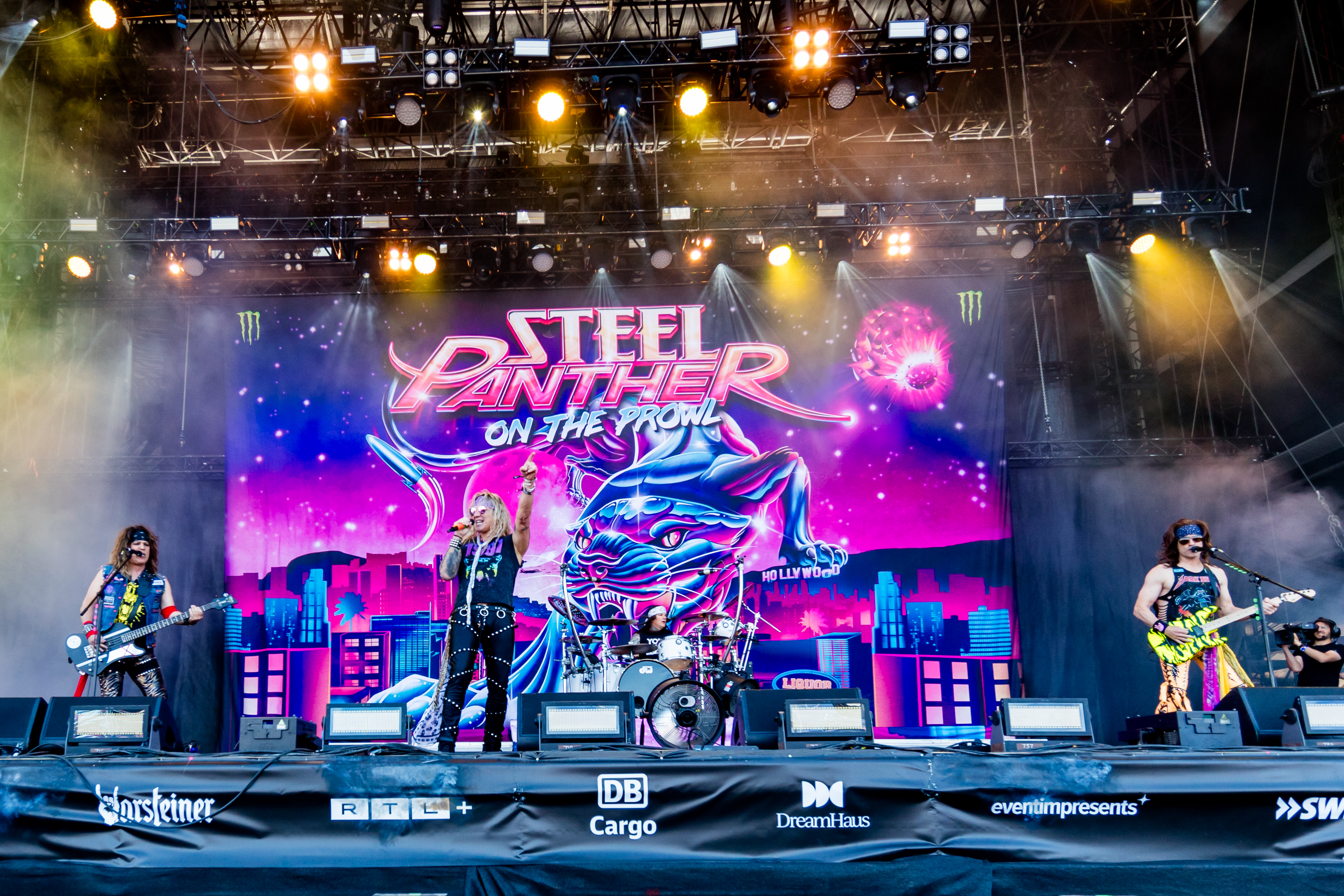
- Studio albums: 6
- EPs: 1
- Singles: 17
- Video albums: 2

The discography of American comedy metal band Steel Panther consists of six studio albums, one extended play, two video albums and seventeen singles.

== Albums ==
=== Studio albums ===
List of studio albums, with selected chart positions
Title	Album details	Peak chart positions											Certifications
Title	Album details	US	US Com.	US Hard Rock	US Rock	AUS	BEL (FL)	CAN	GER	JPN	SWI	UK	Certifications
Feel the Steel	Released: June 8, 2009 (EUR); Label: Universal; Formats: CD, LP, digital download	98	1	14	42	—	—	—	—	38	—	52	BPI: Gold
Balls Out	Released: October 31, 2011 (US); Label: Universal; Formats: CD, LP, digital download	40	1	5	12	50	—	41	—	85	87	37	
All You Can Eat	Released: April 1, 2014 (US); Label: Universal; Formats: CD, LP, digital download	24	1	5	7	2	113	14	15	102	22	12	
Lower the Bar	Released: March 24, 2017; Label: Universal; Formats: CD, LP, digital download	40	1	2	5	10	28	39	14	—	30	26	
Heavy Metal Rules	Released: September 27, 2019; Label: Self-released; Formats: CD, LP, digital download	131	1	7	24	13	98	57	32	—	19	43	
On the Prowl	Released: February 24, 2023; Label: Self-released; Formats: CD, LP, cassette, digital download, streaming	—	—	—	—	—	153	—	32	—	35	—	
"—" denotes a recording that did not chart or was not released in that territory.

=== Video albums ===
List of video albums, with selected chart positions
Title	Album details	Peak chart positions						Certification
Title	Album details	US	US Video	AUS	GER	UK	UK Video	Certification
British Invasion	Released: October 22, 2012 (UK); Label: Guitar Anarchy; Formats: DVD, Blu-ray	—	3	—	97	—	3	ARIA: Gold
Live from Lexxi's Mom's Garage	Released: February 26, 2016	153	—	19	62	58	—	

== Extended plays ==
List of extended plays, with selected details
Title	EP details
Hole Patrol	Released: 2003 as Metal Shop (US and Canada); Re-released: 2005 as Metal Skool (US and Canada); Label: None (self-released); Formats: CD

== Singles ==
List of singles, with selected chart positions, showing year released and album name
Title	Year	Peak chart positions				Album	
Title	Year	US Com.	US Heri. Rock	UK	UK Rock	Album	
"Death to All But Metal"	2008	—	—	—	—	(Single released before album)	
"Community Property"	2009	—	30	—	—	Feel the Steel	
"Eyes of a Panther"	2009	—	—	—	—	Feel the Steel	
"Don't Stop Believin'"	2009	—	—	—	—	Non-album singles	
"Sexy Santa"	2009	—	—	—	—	Non-album singles	
"Fantasy"	2009	—	—	—	—	Non-album singles	
"I Want It That Way"	2010	—	—	200	—	Non-album singles	
"If You Really, Really Love Me"	2011	—	—	—	—	Balls Out	
"17 Girls in a Row"	2011	7	—	—	—	Balls Out	
"Party Like Tomorrow Is the End of the World"	2013	1	—	—	25	All You Can Eat	
"The Burden of Being Wonderful"	2014	8	—	—	—	All You Can Eat	
"Gloryhole"	2014	—	—	—	4	All You Can Eat	
"You're Beautiful When You Don't Talk"	2014	—	—	—	6	All You Can Eat	
"The Stocking Song"	2014	—	—	—	—	Non-album single	
"She's Tight"	2016	1	—	—	25	Lower the Bar	
"Anything Goes"	2016	—	—	—	—	Lower the Bar	
"Poontang Boomerang"	2017	—	—	—	—	Lower the Bar	
"I Got What You Want"	2017	—	—	—	—	Lower the Bar	
"All I Wanna Do Is Fuck (Myself Tonight)"	2019	—	—	—	—	Heavy Metal Rules	
"Always Gonna Be A Ho"	2019	—	—	—	—	Heavy Metal Rules	
"Gods of Pussy"	2019	—	—	—	—	Heavy Metal Rules	
"Fuck 2020"	2020	—	—	—	—	Non-album single	
"Beautiful Girls/D.O.A."	2021	—	—	—	—	Non-album single	
"Never Too Late (To Get Some Pussy Tonight)"	2022	—	—	—	—	On the Prowl	
"1987"	2022	—	—	—	—	On the Prowl	
"Friends with Benefits"	2023	—	—	—	—	On the Prowl	
"The Mother's Day Song"	2026	—	—	—	—	Non-album single	"—" denotes a recording that did not chart or was not released in that territory.

== Other charted songs ==
List of songs, with selected chart positions, showing year released and album name
Title	Year	Peak chart positions		Album
Title	Year	US Com.	UK Rock	Album
"Weenie Ride"	2011	8	—	Balls Out
"If I Was the King"	2014	—	5	All You Can Eat
"—" denotes a recording that did not chart or was not released in that territory.

== Music videos ==
List of music videos, showing year released and director
Title	Year	Director	Ref.
"Death to All But Metal"	2009	Unknown	
"Community Property"	2009	Brendan Malloy	
"Fat Girl"	2010	Dean Cameron	
"If You Really Really Love Me"	2011	Michael Alperowitz	
"Party Like Tomorrow Is The End Of The World"	2013	Rob Riggle	
"The Burden of Being Wonderful"	2014	Kirker Butler	
"Gloryhole"	2014	Frankie Nasso	
"Pussywhipped"	2014	Dean Cameron	
"She's Tight"	2016	Nathan Cox	
"Poontang Boomerang"	2017	Nathan Cox	
"I Got What You Want"	2017	Unknown	
"Wasted Too Much Time (ft. Stone Sour)"	2017	Stix Zadinia	
"All I Wanna Do Is Fuck (Myself Tonight)"	2019	Frankie Nasso	
"Always Gonna Be A Ho"	2019	Frankie Nasso	
"Fuck Everybody"	2019	Unknown	
"Gods of Pussy"	2019	Frankie Nasso	
"Heavy Metal Rules"	2020	Frankie Nasso	
"Let's Get High Tonight"	2020	Frankie Nasso	
"Fuck 2020"	2020	Unknown	
"Never Too Late (To Get Some Pussy Tonight)"	2022	J.T. Arbogast	
"1987"	2022	J.T. Arbogast	
"Friends With Benefits"	2023	Hugh G. Dildeaux	
"Eyes Of A Panther"	2023	Unknown	
"On Your Instagram"	2023	Unknown	
