= Into the Pit =

Into the Pit may refer to:

- Into the Pit (Ultimatum album), 2007
- Into the Pit (Fight album), 2008
- "Into the Pit", a song by Testament from the album The New Order
- "Into the Pit", a song by Fight from the album War of Words
- "Into the Pit" a short story from an anthology book of the same name as part of the Five Nights at Freddy's franchise
  - The video game adaptation of the short story
