= Into the Pit (Fight album) =

Box set by Fight
- Released: July 4, 2008
- Recorded: 1993–1995
- Genre: Heavy metal, groove metal
- Length: 154:01
- Label: Metal God Entertainment

Fight chronology
K5 - The War of Words Demos (2007)	Into the Pit (2008)

Professional ratings
Review scores
Source	Rating
AllMusic	3.5/5 stars

Into the Pit is a box set consisting of three CDs and one DVD, released by heavy metal band Fight, which was fronted by Judas Priest vocalist Rob Halford. It includes Fight's two studio albums War of Words and A Small Deadly Space and the half-live, half-remixes EP Mutations.

The box set was released as a normal edition and as a limited edition. Only 2,500 copies are made of the limited edition, and they are numbered. Also included in the limited edition is a flyer signed by Rob Halford.

== Track listing ==
=== CD1: War of Words (Remixed and Remastered) ===
1. "Into the Pit" – 4:24
2. "Nailed to the Gun" – 3:40
3. "Life in Black" – 4:35
4. "Immortal Sin" – 4:42
5. "War of Words" – 4:53
6. "Laid to Rest" – 4:43
7. "For All Eternity" – 4:50
8. "Little Crazy" – 3:51
9. "Contortion" – 4:36
10. "Kill It" – 3:34
11. "Vicious" – 3:14
12. "Reality, a New Beginning" – 4:43

All tracks composed by Rob Halford. Remixed in 2007 by Roy Z, re-mastered by Andy Horn.

=== CD2: Mutations (EP) (Remastered) ===
1. "Into the Pit" (live, November 14, 1993, NYC) – 4:11
2. "Nailed to the Gun" (live, November 14, 1993, NYC) – 3:35
3. "Freewheel Burning" (live, November 14, 1993, NYC) – 4:45
4. "Little Crazy" (live, November 14, 1993, NYC) – 4:57
5. "War of Words" (Bloody Tongue Mix) – 6:46
6. "Kill It" (Dutch Death Mix) – 3:51
7. "Vicious" (Middle Finger Mix) – 6:05
8. "Immortal Sin" (Tolerance Mix) – 5:49
9. "Little Crazy" (Straight Jacket Mix) – 5:55
10. "Culture of Corruption Mix" (War of Words – bonus remix) – 3:47
11. "Lost Faith Mix" (Kill It – bonus remix) – 3:53

All tracks composed by Rob Halford except "Freewheel Burning" by Downing, Halford and Tipton. Remixed in 2007 by Attie Bauw, re-mastered by Andy Horn.

=== CD3: A Small Deadly Space (Remixed and Remastered) ===
1. "Beneath the Violence" (Halford, Tilse, Travis) – 5:06
2. "Legacy of Hate" (Chaussee, Halford, Tilse) – 4:39
3. "Never Again" (Halford, Tilse, Travis) – 3:57
4. "Mouthpiece" (Chaussee, Halford) – 3:21
5. "I Am Alive" (Halford, Tilse) – 5:03
6. "A Small Deadly Space" (Chaussee, Halford, Travis) – 5:21
7. "Gretna Greene" (Chaussee, Halford, Tilse) – 3:56
8. "Human Crate" (Halford, Tilse) – 6:04
9. "Blowout in the Radio Room" (Halford, Tilse) – 4:14
10. "In a World of My Own Making" (Halford, Tilse) – 7:01

All tracks composed by as shown above. Remixed in 2008 by Roy Z, re-mastered by Maor Appelbaum.

=== DVD: Live in Phoenix ===
1. "Into the Pit"
2. "Nailed to the Gun"
3. "Life in Black"
4. "Immortal Sin"
5. "War of Words"
6. "Laid to Rest"
7. "For All Eternity"
8. "Little Crazy"
9. "Contortion"
10. "Kill It"
11. "Vicious"
12. "Reality – A New Beginning"
13. "Light Comes Out of Black"

All tracks composed by Rob Halford.

Metal God 1993–1995 Footage

1. "Epic Sony War of Words Commercial 1993"
2. "Fight War of Words Amsterdam Studio Footage"
3. "War of Words Worldwide Release Party"
4. "The Metal God Bungee Jumps in Cairns, Australia 1994"
5. A Small Deadly Space promotional music video "Blowout in the Radio Room"
