= K5 – The War of Words Demos =

Compilation album by Fight
- Released: November 28, 2007
- Recorded: Phoenix, Arizona, July 1992
- Genre: Heavy metal, groove metal
- Label: Sony Music
- Producer: Rob Halford

Fight chronology
A Small Deadly Space (1995)	K5 – The War of Words Demos (2007)	Into the Pit (2008)

K5 – The War of Words Demos is a compilation album by heavy metal band Fight, released on November 28, 2007. It mostly consists of demo recordings originally made in July 1992 in Phoenix, Arizona, of what would become their 1993 debut release War of Words, and also includes five new songs.

== Track listing ==
All tracks are written by Rob Halford, except where noted.

No.	Title	Length
1.	"Into the Pit"	4:35
2.	"Nailed to the Gun"	3:33
3.	"Now You Die" (new 2007)	3:36
4.	"Life in Black"	4:51
5.	"Kill It"	3:32
6.	"Contortion"	4:19
7.	"Forbidden" (new 2007)	4:41
8.	"War of Words"	4:56
9.	"Psycho Suicide"	4:46
10.	"Down" (new 2007)	4:38
11.	"Vicious"	3:13
12.	"Beast Denies" (new 2007)	4:46
13.	"Laid to Rest"	5:21
14.	"Jesus Saves"	3:38
15.	"Dead Men Talk" (new 2007)	5:10
16.	"For All Eternity"	4:36
Total length:		70:11

Japanese edition bonus track
No.	Title	Writer(s)	Length
1.	"Solar Angels" (Live from Tokyo, Japan)	Halford, Glenn Tipton, and K. K. Downing	4:35
Total length:			74:46

=== Notes ===
- "Beast Denies" is an early version of "Reality, a New Beginning" from War of Words, but with different lyrics
- "Dead Men Talk" contains some parts that would later end up in the song "Human Crate" from A Small Deadly Space
- "Psycho Suicide" would be re-recorded and be featured as a hidden track after a two-minute silence on "In a World of My Own Making" from A Small Deadly Space

== Personnel ==
Fight

- Rob Halford – vocals
- Brian Tilse – guitars
- Russ Parrish – guitars
- Jay Jay – bass
- Scott Travis – drums

Production

- Produced by Rob Halford
- Executive producer – John Baxter
- Tracks 1–4, 6, 8–10, and 15–16 are multitrack mixes, mixed by Roy Z in 2006
- Tracks 5, 7, and 11–14 are DAT demos, mixed by Rob Halford in 1992
- Mastered by Tom Baker
- Cover illustration/art design – Marc Sasso
- Booklet layout/additional art – Attila Juhasz
- Photography – Neil Zlozower, William Hames, John Baxter
