= Mutations (Fight album) =

Compilation album by Fight
- Released: July 12, 1994
- Genre: Heavy metal, groove metal, industrial metal
- Length: 45:51
- Label: Epic
- Producer: Attie Bauw and Rob Halford

Fight chronology
Mutations (1994)	K5 - The War of Words Demos (2007)

Alternative cover
- 2008 Remastered edition cover

Professional ratings
Review scores
Source	Rating
Allmusic	2.5/5 stars

Mutations is a compilation album released by the heavy metal band Fight in 1994. It features live recordings alongside studio remixes of songs from War of Words.

== Track listing ==
All tracks are written by Rob Halford, except where noted.

Live recordings, Nov. 14, 1993, NYC
No.	Title	Length
1.	"Into the Pit" (live)	4:10
2.	"Nailed to the Gun" (live)	3:34
3.	"Freewheel Burning" (live, written and composed by Rob Halford, K. K. Downing, and Glenn Tipton)	4:45
4.	"Little Crazy" (live)	4:56

Remixes
No.	Title	Length
5.	"War of Words" (Bloody Tongue Mix)	6:48
6.	"Kill It" (Dutch Death Mix)	3:51
7.	"Vicious" (Middle Finger Mix)	6:06
8.	"Immortal Sin" (Tolerance Mix)	5:49
9.	"Little Crazy" (Straight Jacket Mix)	5:55

2008 bonus tracks
No.	Title	Length
10.	"War of Words" (Culture of Corruption Mix)	3:47
11.	"Kill It" (Lost Faith Mix)	3:53

== Personnel ==
Fight

- Rob Halford – vocals
- Brian Tilse – guitars
- Russ Parrish – guitars
- Jay Jay – bass
- Scott Travis – drums

Production

- Produced by Attie Bauw and Rob Halford
- Executive producer – John Baxter
- Recorded and mixed by Attie Bauw
- Remastered by Andy Horn (2008 edition)
- Art design – Marc Sasso
