= Laid to Rest (disambiguation) =

Laid to Rest is a 2009 American slasher film.

Laid to Rest may also refer to:

- "Laid to Rest", a song by Lamb of God from Ashes of the Wake, 2004
- "Laid to Rest", a song by Fight from War of Words, 1993
