= Balls Out =

Balls Out may refer to:

- Balls Out (album), a 2011 album by Steel Panther
- Balls Out (2014 film), an American live-action/animated sports comedy film directed by Andrew Disney
- Balls Out: Gary the Tennis Coach, a 2009 American sports comedy film directed by Danny Leiner
- "Balls Out", a 2005 song by the Bloodhound Gang from the album Hefty Fine
