= Attitude City =

Studio album by Ninja Sex Party
- Released: July 17, 2015
- Recorded: Arcadia, California
- Genre: Comedy rock; synth-pop
- Length: 33:51
- Label: Self-released
- Producer: Brian Wecht

Ninja Sex Party chronology
Strawberries and Cream (2013)	Attitude City (2015)	Under the Covers (2016)

Singles from Attitude City
- 1. "Party of Three" Released: October 22, 2013; 2. "Dragon Slayer" Released: February 21, 2014; 3. "Attitude City" Released: June 24, 2014; 4. "Why I Cry" Released: August 12, 2014; 5. "Peppermint Creams" Released: November 19, 2014; 6. "Road Trip" Released: April 22, 2015; 7. "6969" Released: July 17, 2015; 8. "Cookies!" Released: July 28, 2015; 9. "Samurai Abstinence Patrol" Released: May 10, 2016

Attitude City is the third studio album by the American musical comedy duo Ninja Sex Party. The album was released on July 17, 2015. Six tracks from the album, "Party of Three", "Dragon Slayer", "Attitude City", "Why I Cry", "Peppermint Creams", and "Road Trip" were all released as singles on their YouTube channel prior to its release. It was a commercial success, especially in the comedy music sector.

The song "6969" features Steel Panther singer Michael Starr, and references Steel Panther's song "Into the Future" from their 2011 album Balls Out, which is also set in the year 6969.

== Track listing ==
All tracks are written by Dan Avidan and Brian Wecht.

Attitude City track listing
No.	Title	Length
1.	"Intro (Attitude)"	1:16
2.	"Road Trip"	2:46
3.	"Attitude City"	3:10
4.	"Why I Cry"	3:04
5.	"Dubstep"	0:16
6.	"Dragon Slayer"	3:19
7.	"Party of Three"	3:22
8.	"Buttsex Goldilocks"	0:38
9.	"Samurai Abstinence Patrol"	2:52
10.	"Peppermint Creams"	2:26
11.	"Cookies!"	1:24
12.	"6969"	8:29
13.	"Outro (City)"	0:49

== Personnel ==
=== Ninja Sex Party ===
- Dan Avidan – vocals
- Brian Wecht – music, production

=== Guests ===
- Super Guitar Bros – acoustic guitar (track 3)
- Arin Hanson – guest vocals (tracks 7, 8, 9 and 12)
- Michael Starr – guest vocals (track 12)

=== Crew ===
- David Dominguez – co-producer, recording
- Dan Castellani, Jr. – mixing
- Hans DeKline – mastering

== Charts ==
=== Weekly charts ===
Weekly chart performance for Attitude City
Chart (2015)	Peak position
US Billboard 200	55
US Comedy Albums (Billboard)	1
US Independent Albums (Billboard)	5
US Top Album Sales (Billboard)	21

=== Year-end charts ===
2015 year-end chart performance for Attitude City
Chart (2015)	Position
US Comedy Albums (Billboard)	7

2016 year-end chart performance for Attitude City
Chart (2016)	Position
US Comedy Albums (Billboard)	10
