= Mark Chaussee =

American guitarist

- Born: Minneapolis, Minnesota, U.S.
- Genres: Heavy metal, hard rock
- Occupation: Musician
- Instrument: Guitar

Mark Chaussee is an American heavy metal and hard rock guitarist born in Minneapolis, Minnesota. He played guitar in World of Hurt, The Coup De Grace, Fight, Danzig, Jimmy Coup, and Marilyn Manson.

== Career ==
=== World of Hurt ===
World of Hurt from Minneapolis, Minnesota is the first known band of Mark Chaussee.

=== The Coup De Grace ===
James Mecherle's band The Coup De Grace is the first world-known band of Mark Chaussee. "He played in The Coup De Grace for a while and we had the best of times! So much fun together!" – February 28, 2007, Jimmy Coup.

=== Fight ===
In Rob Halford's post-Judas Priest band Fight: guitarist (1994–1995). He was discovered through a tape he sent to Rob Halford's management. Joined the band as a replacement for the recently departed Russ Parrish. "We put Mark in a tight situation – pretty cruel actually. We stuck him in a small studio and said, "Play". He was great." – Rob Halford, A Small Deadly Space Press Kit, 1995. Participated in recording of an album A Small Deadly Space (1995) and tour across the US and Canada.

=== Danzig ===
Chaussee participated in recording of two songs (Sacrifice and Serpentia) on the Danzig album Blackacidevil (1996) as an invited musician.

=== Returning in The Coup De Grace ===
Right after leaving Danzig, Chaussee rejoined his second band The Coupe De Grace and participated in recording of a demo and touring the Midwestern United States in 1999.

=== Stereomud ===
After the unsuccessful audition in Killswitch, he joined Stereomud in the summer of 2000, but met with similar results. "After rehearsing for a few days we recorded our first demo in Atlanta and all agreed we had something special going on. The band was formed, almost... Once we had about 10 songs, the band decided that we could use another guitarist to augment the sound. I called up my friend Mark Chaussee who came in and played with us for about two months. Things didn't work out with Mark and we tried out a bunch of other guys." – Erik Rogers (Stereomud vocalist), PRP.

=== Jimmy Coup ===
In 2003, Chaussee returned with James Mecherle, now known as Jimmy Coup, to work on a "full-on metal" album with ex-The Coup De Grace guitarist Steve Wresh and drummer Brett Degendorfer. "It's gonna have lots and lots of guitars, killing double leads, tough vocals and hit hard. All the shit I love!" – Jimmy Coup, Unearthed Archives.

=== Marilyn Manson ===
Chaussee joined Marilyn Manson in autumn 2004 replacing the recently departed John 5, as a temporary live guitarist (2004–2005) for the Against All Gods world tour in support of Marilyn Manson's greatest hits collection Lest We Forget (2004), where tours proceeded from October, 27th, 2004 till August, 31, 2005.

Chaussee's style of play featured an original and exotic heavy sound, similar to "old-school" heavy metal – crude and unpolished, contrasting the glam-rock influences of former guitarist John 5 and the former style of the band as a whole. Mark lent a more rigid, gloomy and aggressive sound to the band. "I thought Mark added something great and different to the tour. We haven't had the opportunity to write songs together" – Marilyn Manson.
