= The Lounge Kittens =

English comedy lounge band

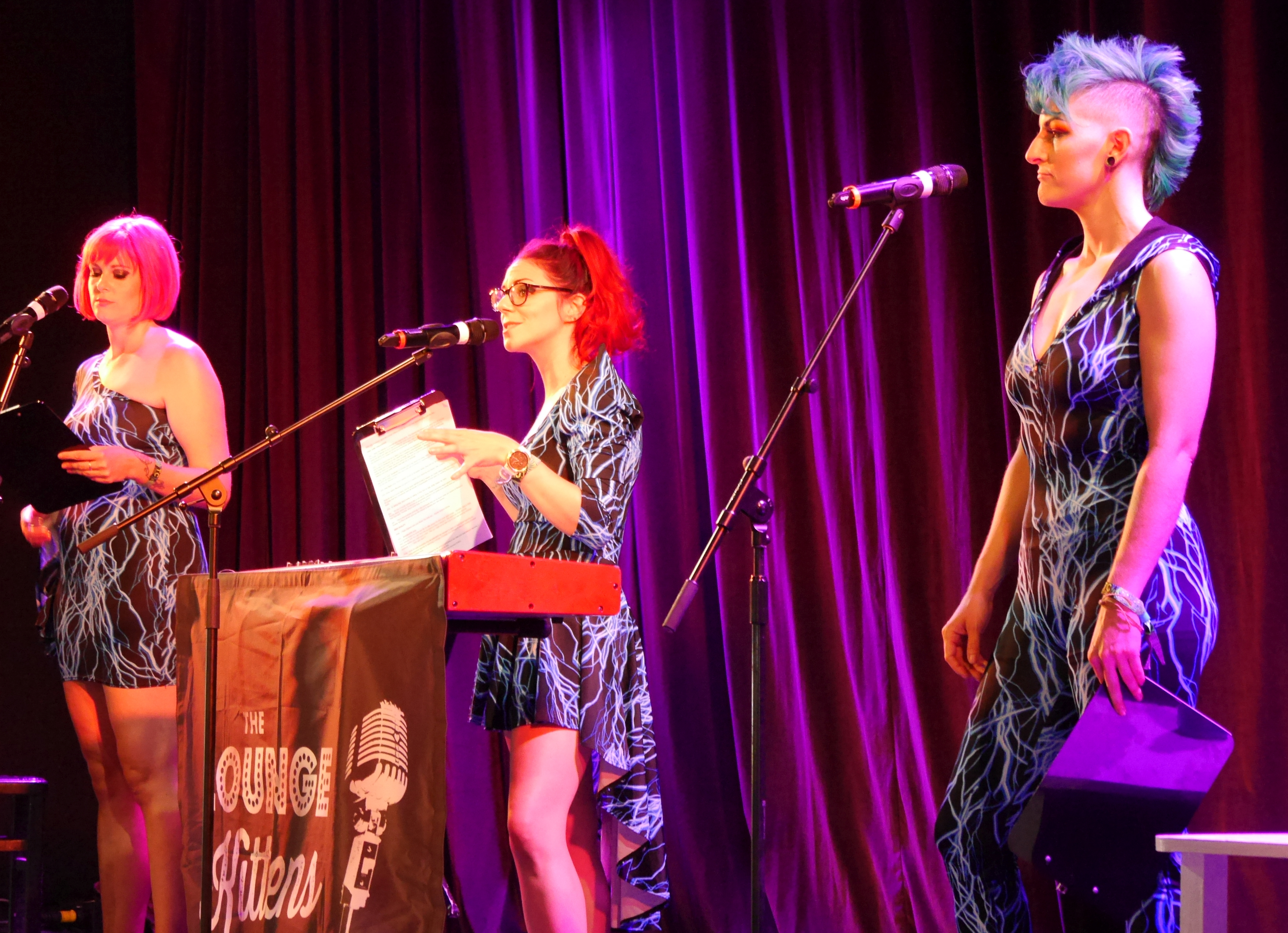
- The Lounge Kittens at the Glastonbury Festival in June 2019. From left to right: Zan Lawther, Jenny Deacon, and Timia Gwendoline.

Background information
- Origin: Southampton, England, UK
- Genres: Lounge music, parody, comedy rock
- Years active: 2012–2020
- Members: Jenny Deacon; Timia Gwendoline; Zan Lawther
- Website: www.theloungekittens.com

The Lounge Kittens were an English comedy lounge band formed in Southampton in 2012. They perform covers of classic popular songs, in particular rock and heavy metal songs, in a lounge style focusing on vocal harmonies accompagned by a piano. The trio consists of vocalists Jenny Deacon, Timia Gwendoline, and Zan Lawther, sometimes called Red Kitten, Blue Kitten, and Pink Kitten respectively because of the colour of their hair, with Deacon also performing piano.

Their songs are released via their YouTube channel and accompanied by tongue-in-cheek videos which take token ideas from the original artists' videos. They released their debut EP Just The Tip... in 2015 and their first full-length album Sequins & C-Bombs the following year. In 2019 they released a second EP, Have Another....

On 23 September 2019, the trio announced that they would split-up, explaining that band was never "financially viable" and that the members' financial struggles were "to the point where it's all just a bit too hard", wanting to end The Lounge Kittens on a high note before it "stops being any fun." They performed a three-show farewell tour in early 2020, culminating with their final show taking place on 29 February 2020 in Southampton.

== Biography ==
Deacon and Gwendoline met in 2012 at a production of Company at the University of Southampton, owing their meeting to the fact that they were both wearing the same black, white, and silver glitter socks. Deacon runs a Rock Choir in Southampton where she and Gwendoline met Lawther. During a night out at Southampton's iconic rock club The Dungeon, the idea for The Lounge Kittens was born out of singing along to Vengaboys song "We Like to Party (The Vengabus)".

The Lounge Kittens sing in three-part harmony and credit Richard Cheese and The Andrews Sisters as their influences; 'Imagine if Richard Cheese seduced all three of the Andrews Sisters...and each had a little Lounge Baby. The Lounge Kittens would be the scandalous by product of that sordid affair'. Their first demo recordings, made in early February 2014, were an eclectic trio of musical styles: "Firework" by Katy Perry, "Rollin'" by Limp Bizkit, and "Ob La Di Ob La Da" by The Beatles. Their repertoire boasts over 40 songs, including songs by The Prodigy, House of Pain, Elton John, Rammstein, and Iron Maiden. and they cite their musical tastes cover Rock, Jazz, Punk, Psychobilly, Ragga, Hip Hop, Folk, Ska, Pop, Soul, Metal, Dance, House, Grunge, and others.

== Music and videos ==
On 26 February 2014 the Lounge Kittens posted a video to YouTube of their cover version of Limp Bizkit's "Rollin'". On 28 February they sent a tweet to Fred Durst, the Limp Bizkit frontman, with a link to their video. Four hours later Durst replied 'loving it' and promptly posted the video on his band's Facebook page. Following the endorsement from Durst, The Lounge Kittens video went viral and subsequently had appearances on Kerrang!'s and Metal Hammer's Facebook pages. Within a week the video had nearly 75,000 views.

Following on from the success of "Rollin'", The Lounge Kittens worked on increasing their repertoire. Deacon had the idea to arrange an Aerosmith song in a tango style. Deacon says 'I was imagining the kind of naughty, sexy, but totally clueless image we could make through a tango... The tango is about power, so I naturally turned to rock love songs'. In June 2014 the video to the song "I Don't Want To Miss A Thing" was released.

Later in 2014 The Lounge Kittens released their own version of Slipknot's "Duality". The video's release coincided with the release of Slipknot's fifth album and UK tour. Gwendoline says 'The Lounge Kittens as a band are all about duality', referring to their combination of lounge music and rock/metal songs. The slapstick comedy chases in the video complement the polka rhythms in Deacon's piano. 'Slipknot's Duality has got such a frantic energy about it' says Deacon, 'especially when you accompany the video alongside it – with super dark angst and dirty rhythm, and I really wanted to convey the same atmosphere but still take it away from its origins. The first two Lounge Kittens videos had received some criticism from fans of the original songs, but the backlash from Slipknot fans on their interpretation of "Duality" was unforeseen. In an interview for TeamRock Radio Gwendoline mentions that while the criticism for the first two videos had been fairly tame and laughable, the criticism for "Duality" had been vulgar. They add 'However, for every one bad comment there are three good comments'.

In December 2014 The Lounge Kittens released their version of Andrew W.K.'s "Party Hard" as a downloadable single. Rather than sing a Christmas song Gwendoline says the focus of the band was on partying at Christmas and dubs "Party Hard" as 'the ultimate party anthem'. The band's aim was to get to Christmas number 2, Lawther saying 'number 2 is more satisfying than number 1'.

Following a huge demand from fans, The Lounge Kittens released the EP Just The Tip... on 26 February 2015. This coincided with the release of their cover of Steel Panther's "Gloryhole" the following day and the start of their Fluffing For Steel Panther tour. The release features all of the songs they had previously released videos for, with the exception of "SeanAPaul Medley" whose video came after the EP's release. Deacon said their song choice was 'to show the true variety of our musical passions, genre tastes, naughtiness and vocal range'.

Upon their return from tour with Steel Panther, the Lounge Kittens released the sixth and final song from their album; "SeanAPaul Medley". This is an arrangement of seven songs by Sean Paul; "Temperature", "Get Busy", "Like Glue", "Got 2 Luv U", "Hold My Hand", "She Doesn’t Mind", and "Ever Blazin'".

On 16 September 2016 the band released the crowd funded album titled Sequins & C-Bombs which comprises 15 new tracks including Bounce which was the feature of a promotional video release and Facebook Live event which occurred at St Pancras Station in London on 15 September 2015.

== Live ==
The success of "Rollin'" led The Lounge Kittens to making several appearances in 2014 at Sonisphere and Glastonbury festivals. At Sonisphere The Lounge Kittens drew in a large crowd to their shows on the Satellite Stage and Rocky Royalty area. After seeing their performance, Fred Durst invited The Lounge Kittens to open Limp Bizkit's show on the main stage, singing a part of their own rendition of "Rollin'". At Glastonbury festival The Lounge Kittens performed six shows at five venues in just two days.

In September 2014 and February 2015 The Lounge Kittens headlined their own UK tours; Girls On Tour and Fluffing for Steel Panther respectively.

In March and April 2015 The Lounge Kittens supported Steel Panther on the UK and European legs of their All You Can Eat tour.

In June 2015 The Lounge Kittens played The Encore Stage at Download Festival.

In December 2016 The Lounge Kittens supported Status Quo with REO Speedwagon on "The Last Night Of The Electrics" tour

On 23 September 2019, the trio announced that they would split-up, stating: "It is with the heaviest of hearts that we announce 3 final performances to mark the end of TLK. Despite your unwavering support and generosity, we have struggled to keep TLK financially viable over the years and although it’s never been 'about the money' when we add the financial strain to the demands of our own lives and our individual wants and needs, we have simply come to the point where it’s all just a bit too hard. What we don’t want to happen is to reach the point where it’s all too hard and it stops being any fun because the fun, dear Kittens, was always the only reason to do any of this. We want to assure you that through a lot of honest conversation, our decision was made with love and care for each other, and for you all. We decided that if we were going to call time on the band, then there’s only one way we want to go out – the three of us standing together and having a big fucking last laugh. We would like our final shows to be a huge celebration of everything that we’ve achieved over the past 6 years (and by 'we', we mean us three, the whole of our extended Team Kitten and all of you lot). We hope you will take up your place in the squad one last time. A social media post cannot adequately describe what being in TLK has done for each of us and we understand that some of you hold your memories and experiences of TLK just as closely as we do. [...] As always, big Kitten love. It’s been a helluva ride!"

In February 2020, The Lounge Kittens performed their final three shows ("An Evening With The (Departure) Lounge Kittens & Friends") in Manchester, London and Southampton. The final show was at The 1865, Southampton on 29 February 2020.

== Discography ==
=== Albums and EPs ===
==== Just The Tip... (2015) ====
Track	Title	Original Artist	Video Release Date
1	Party Hard	Andrew W.K.	3 December 2014
2	Duality	Slipknot	17 October 2014
4	Get Busy Blazin', Hold My Temperature Like Glue	Sean Paul	8 April 2015
4	Rollin'	Limp Bizkit	26 February 2014
5	I Don't Want to Miss a Thing	Aerosmith	2 June 2014
6	Gloryhole	Steel Panther	27 February 2015

==== Sequins & C-Bombs (2016) ====
Track	Title	Original Artist	Video Release Date
1	Poison	Alice Cooper	16 August 2016
2	Bounce	System of a Down	15 September 2016
3	Yeah	Usher	19 April 2017
4	Jump Around	House of Pain	—N/a
5	Love Is Only a Feeling	The Darkness	16 December 2016
6	Dirty Deeds Done Dirt Cheap	AC/DC	16 June 2016
7	Africa	Toto	26 July 2016
8	Smack My Firestarter to Outer Space	The Prodigy	—N/a
9	Bodies	Drowning Pool	—N/a
10	Want You Bad	The Offspring	—N/a
11	Changes	David Bowie	—N/a
12	Sad but True	Metallica	4 March 2020
13	Rammers (Medley)	Rammstein	—N/a
14	The Cave	Mumford & Sons	—N/a
15	The Beautiful People	Marilyn Manson	16 October 2016

==== Have Another... (2019) ====
Track	Title	Original Artist	Video Release Date
1	Gold Dust	DJ Fresh	13 March 2019
2	Violent Pornography	System Of A Down	—N/a
3	The Middle	Jimmy Eat World	9 January 2019
4	Cheerleader	Omi	—N/a
5	One Step Closer	Linkin Park	31 October 2019
6	Love Walked In	Thunder	—N/a

==== Do It LIVE (2020) ====
Track	Title	Original Artist	Venue
1	Welcome	—N/a	St Pancras Old Church
2	Rollin' (Air Raid Vehicle)	Limp Bizkit	St Pancras Old Church
3	Duality	Slipknot	Band on the Wall
4	Violent Pornography (With Full Band)	System of a Down	Union Chapel
5	We're Definitely Going to Hell	—N/a	St Pancras Old Church
6	All Night Long (All Night) (With Full Band)	Lionel Richie	Union Chapel
7	The Middle	Jimmy Eat World	Band on the Wall
8	Foxtrot Uniform Charlie Kilo	Bloodhound Gang	St Pancras Old Church
9	Jump Around	House of Pain	St Pancras Old Church
10	Gold Dust (With Full Band)	DJ Fresh	Union Chapel
11	Gloryhole	Steel Panther	Union Chapel
12	Hail Satan!	—N/a	St Pancras Old Church
13	One Step Closer (With Full Band)	Linkin Park	Band on the Wall
14	Angry White Guy Polka	"Weird Al" Yankovic	Union Chapel
15	We've Been the Lounge Kittens	—N/a	St Pancras Old Church
16	Medley: A Vocal Tribute to Avicii (With Full Band)	Avicii	St Pancras Old Church
17	Buh-Bye	—N/a	The 1865

=== Singles ===
"Party Hard" - 14 December 2014
"Medley: A Vocal Tribute to Avicii" - 21 February 2019

=== Other ===
"Sad but True" - 3 June 2015. The Lounge Kittens feature on a free cover CD in Kerrang! with their version of the Metallica song.
