= Fuck Everyone =

Fuck Everyone may refer to:

- "Fuck Everyone", a song by Everlast from Forever Everlasting
- "F**k Everyone", a song by Lola Young from I'm Only F**king Myself

== See also ==
- "Fuck Everybody", a song by Steel Panther from Heavy Metal Rules
