= Fight (band) =

British-American metal band

- Fight in 1993

Background information
- Origin: Phoenix, Arizona, U.S.
- Genres: Heavy metal; groove metal; thrash metal
- Years active: 1992–1995; 1997
- Label: Epic Records
- Spinoff of: Judas Priest
- Past members: Rob Halford; Brian Tilse; John "Jay Jay" Brown; Scott Travis; Russ Parrish; Robby Lochner; Mark Chaussee

Fight was an American heavy metal band formed in Phoenix, Arizona by British vocalist Rob Halford following his departure from Judas Priest in 1992.

== History ==
The band's origins date back to 1991 after Halford attended a Pantera show during their tour supporting Cowboys From Hell. Inspired by their sound, he invited them to tour with Judas Priest in Europe, befriending them to advance his desire for a more aggressive American metal sound. During the early rehearsal sessions for the Operation Rock & Roll tour, Halford started writing material of his own, influenced by the hardcore direction of up and coming American metal bands of the 1990's. This would have become just a solo project while he remained in Judas Priest, but for a misunderstanding. His contract required he notify the band of his solo project, and while he intended to work on this during "a break" they all needed after the Painkiller tour, the official notice was taken as quitting the band. The relationship with the band deteriorated from there, resulting in an eleven year break.

Halford would spend much of 1992 appearing with bands such as Black Sabbath, Pantera and Skid Row, all the while writing and recording demos through the early part of 1993. Halford met Jay Jay, who would become his tattoo artist, and discovered that he was bass guitarist for a local Phoenix based hardcore band called Cyanide. After attending one of their shows, Halford hired Jay Jay and guitarist Brian Tilse. Guitarist Russ Parrish from Jeff Pilson's band War & Peace joined soon after, and the lineup was finalized with the addition of drummer Scott Travis, who was still a member of Judas Priest. The band known as Fight was formed.

The band's debut album War of Words was released on September 14, 1993. An EP titled Mutations was released on July 12, 1994, containing live tracks and studio remixes. Russ Parrish left the band in early 1994 and was temporarily replaced by Robby Lochner for the live shows until new guitarist Mark Chaussee from The Coup de Grace joined later that year. The second album A Small Deadly Space was released on April 18, 1995, but was not as successful as War of Words. Although they had plans to tour in support of the album into 1996 and release a third album, change in the music industry and the diminished interest in the band resulted in their dismissal from Epic Records and their disbandment in the Fall of 1995.

On December 20, 1997, Fight reunited with three of the original members for a one-off performance at the Mason Jar in Phoenix.

Halford would not rule out the possibility of the band's reformation.

== Discography ==
=== Studio albums ===
Title	Album details	Peak chart positions			Sales
Title	Album details	USA	SWE	GER	Sales
War of Words	Released: September 9, 1993; Label: Epic; Formats: CD, digital download	83	49	56	US: 223,902+
A Small Deadly Space	Released: April 18, 1995; Label: Epic; Formats: CD, digital download	120	48	—	US: 67,407+
"—" denotes a recording that did not chart or was not released in that territory.

=== Compilation albums ===
Title	Album details
Mutations	Released: July 12, 1994; Label: Epic; Formats: CD
K5 – The War of Words Demos	Released: 2007; Label: Sony Music; Formats: CD, digital download
Into the Pit	Released: July 4, 2008; Label: Metal God Entertainment; Formats: CD (box set)

=== Video albums ===
Title	Album details
War of Words – The Film	Released: 2007; Label: Metal God Entertainment; Formats: DVD
