= Michael Starr (singer) =

American singer (born 1965)

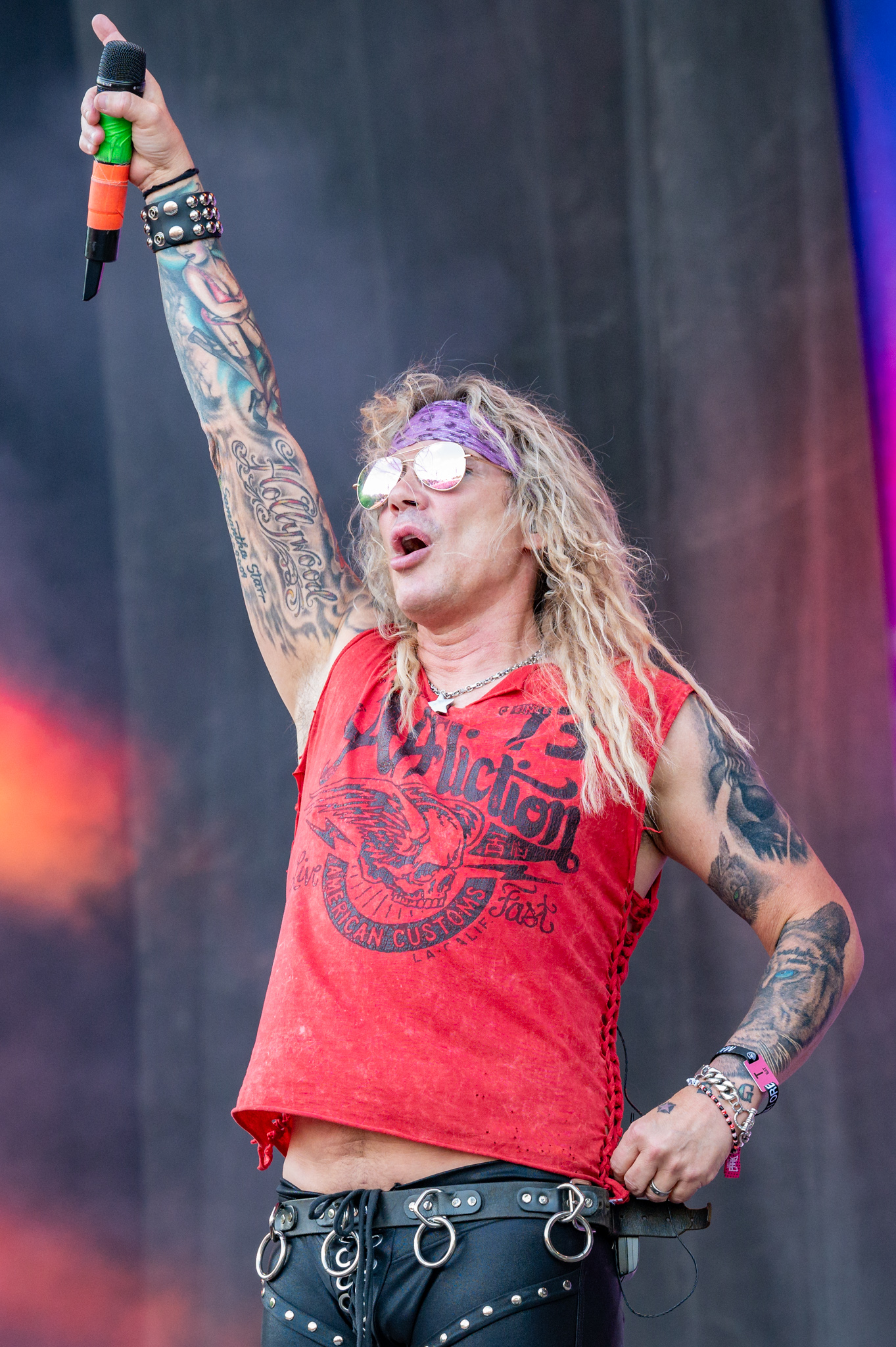
- Starr performing in June 2023

Background information
- Also known as: David Lee Ralph; Michael Diamond; Michael Saenz
- Born: Ralph Michael Saenz; May 17, 1965 (age 61); Chicago, Illinois, U.S.
- Origin: Los Angeles, California, U.S.
- Genres: Glam metal; hard rock
- Occupations: Singer; songwriter
- Years active: 1980s–present
- Member of: Steel Panther
- Formerly of: L.A. Guns; Nanowar of Steel

Ralph Michael Saenz (born May 17, 1965), better known as Michael Starr, is an American musician who is best known as the lead vocalist of the comedic glam metal band Steel Panther.

== Early and personal life ==
Saenz was born in Chicago on May 17, 1965. He is of Spanish and Swedish descent. He was raised primarily in the Van Nuys neighborhood of Los Angeles, where his father was a college professor. He is often cited as having a Ph.D. in English from University of California, Berkeley; however, this is a common misconception, as Saenz had lied about his education to get an apartment when his credit was being checked.

== Career ==
Saenz was the lead singer for the David Lee Roth-era Van Halen tribute band Atomic Punks from May 1994 to December 2008, where he used the stage name David Lee Ralph. He formed the band with future bandmate, Steel Panther guitarist Russ Parrish. Saenz was briefly the lead singer for L.A. Guns, singing on the Wasted EP. He also has sung for the band 7% Solution.

Saenz formed Steel Panther, a satirical metal band, in 2000 with Parrish under the name Metal Shop (soon changed into Metal Skool, Danger Kitty [for a commercial], then into Steel Panther). The band has become successful worldwide, and has many celebrity fans who have performed onstage with them.

He provided background vocals for AFI on the albums Sing the Sorrow and Decemberunderground. Saenz also briefly appeared in the 2001 film Rock Star, playing the part of a singer auditioning for the fictitious band Steel Dragon.

== Discography ==
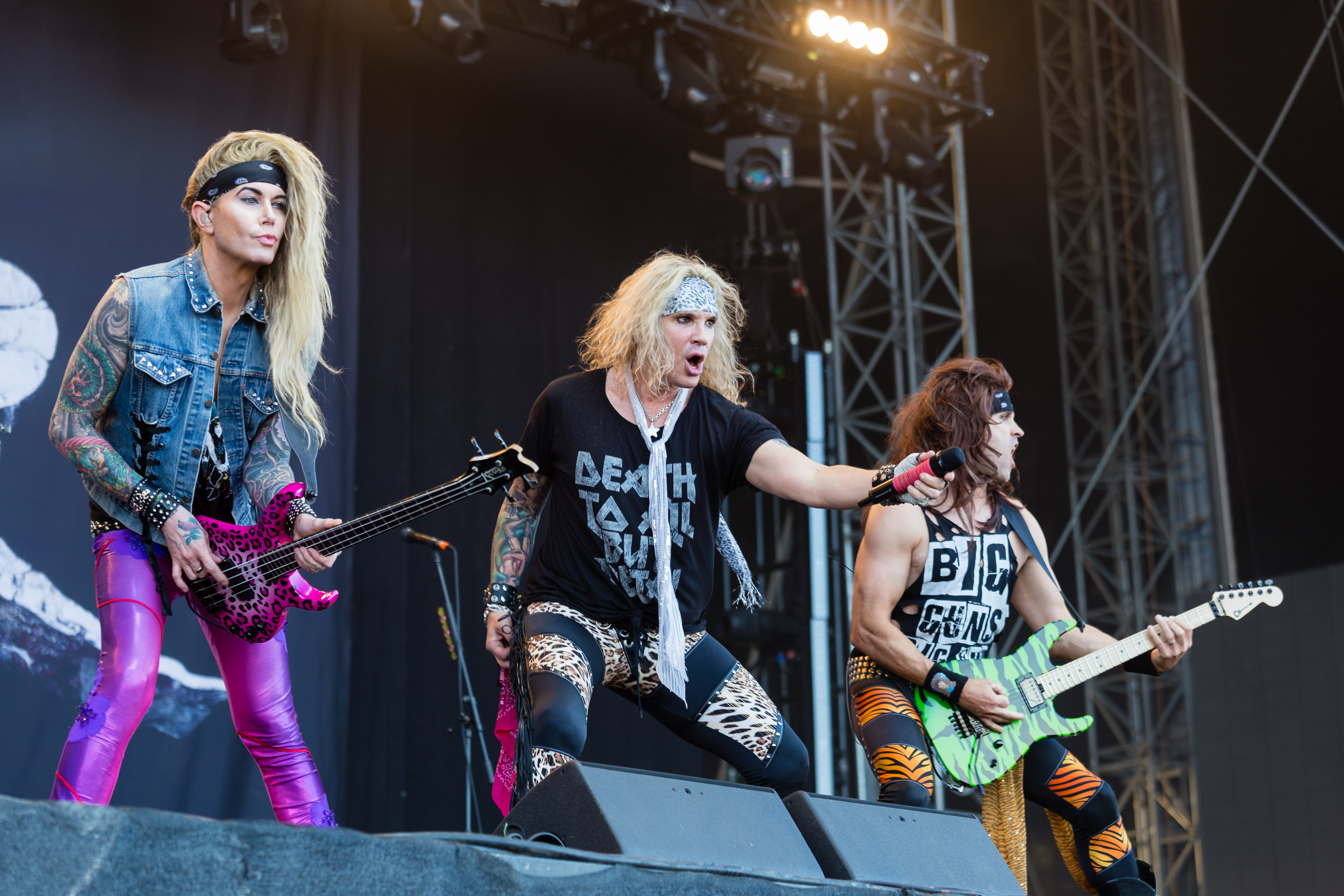
Starr (center) with Steel Panther at Nova Rock 2017

=== With 7% Solution ===
- Better Late Than Never (Mitch Perry Album) (1998)

=== With Long Gone ===
- Long Gone (2017)

=== With L.A. Guns ===
- Wasted (1998)

=== With Steel Panther ===
- Hole Patrol (2003)
- Feel the Steel (2009)
- Balls Out (2011)
- All You Can Eat (2014)
- Lower the Bar (2017)
- Heavy Metal Rules (2019)
- On the Prowl (2023)

=== With Metal Sludge ===
- Hey That's What I Call Sludge – Vol 1 (2003)

=== Guest appearances ===
- Fozzy – Do You Wanna Start a War (vocals on "Tonight")
- Gus G. – I Am the Fire (vocals on "Redemption")
- Ninja Sex Party – Attitude City and Level Up (vocals on "6969")
- Nanowar of Steel – Uranus
- Various artists – Peacemaker (featured artist in "Pumped Up Kicks")
- Crashdïet - Automaton (Vocals on "Powerline")
- Sophie Lloyd – Imposter Syndrome (vocals on "Runaway")
