= Dragon Slayer (song) =

Single by Ninja Sex Party

from the album Attitude City
- Released: February 19, 2014
- Recorded: 2013–2014
- Genre: Comedy rock, electronic rock, synthpop
- Length: 3:18
- Label: Self-released
- Songwriter(s): Dan Avidan, Brian Wecht
- Producer(s): Dan Avidan, Brian Wecht

Ninja Sex Party singles chronology
"Party of Three" (2013)	"Dragon Slayer" (2014)	"Attitude City" (2014)

"Dragon Slayer" is a song written and performed by American comedy rock band Ninja Sex Party. The song was originally recorded for the band's third studio album Attitude City. The track was released as the band's sixth single on February 19, 2014, becoming the second single to be released in promotion of Attitude City.

== Packaging ==
The single cover for "Dragon Slayer" was painted by London-based artist Katie Scott. The artwork, originally posted by Scott on her Facebook page in November 2013, features Danny Sexbang sitting on a dragon corpse, holding a bloodied sword with two half-naked girls sitting at his feet. Ninja Brian stands in the background holding a pocket knife. She had previously created the artwork for British alternative rock band Bombay Bicycle Club's third studio album A Different Kind of Fix.

== Music video ==
The music video for "Dragon Slayer", directed by Game Grumps co-host Arin Hanson, and featuring cameo appearances from Hanson, Game Grumps editor Barry Kramer, Steam Train co-host Ross O'Donovan, and internet personality Comic Book Girl 19 premiered on YouTube on February 21, 2014.

The video broke the threshold of 1 million views in June 2014, becoming the sixth music video by the band to have achieved such. The video is the fifth most viewed upload on the channel, with over 7 million views as of June 2019.

== Track listings ==
Digital download
No.	Title	Writer(s)	Producer(s)	Length
1.	"Dragon Slayer"	Dan Avidan, Brian Wecht	Avidan, Wecht	3:18

== Personnel ==
Ninja Sex Party

- Dan Avidan – vocals
- Brian Wecht – keyboards, production

== Charts ==
Chart (2014)	Peak position
US Comedy Digital Tracks (Billboard)	17

== Release history ==
Country	Date	Format	Label
Australia	February 19, 2014	Digital download	Micro, Inc.
United Kingdom	February 19, 2014	Digital download	Micro, Inc.
United States	February 19, 2014	Digital download	Micro, Inc.
