= Under the Covers (Ninja Sex Party album) =

2016 Ninja Sex Party album

Studio album by Ninja Sex Party
- Released: March 4, 2016
- Genres: Rock; new wave; progressive rock; glam rock
- Length: 45:50
- Label: Self-released
- Producer: Jim Arsenault

Ninja Sex Party chronology
Attitude City (2015)	Under the Covers (2016)	Under the Covers, Vol. II (2017)

Under the Covers is the fourth studio album by American comedy duo Ninja Sex Party, and their first cover album. The concept for the album and title were revealed on July 28, 2015, and the album released on March 4, 2016. Unlike their previous albums, Under the Covers is composed only of covers of songs from the 1970s and 1980s and strays from the duo's traditional comedic style.

It is their first album released with Tupper Ware Remix Party as their backup band; NSP keyboardist Brian Wecht previously performed all instruments on the band's albums. On February 23, 2016, a music video was released for their cover of "Take On Me"; the video for their cover of "Everybody Wants to Rule the World" was released one week later, on March 1, 2016. The video cover of "Wish You Were Here" was released December 25, 2016. A follow-up, Under the Covers, Vol. II, was released on October 27, 2017.

== Track listing ==
No.	Title	Writer(s)	Original artist	Length
1.	"Take On Me"	Magne Furuholmen, Morten Harket, Pål Waaktaar	A-ha	3:59
2.	"Everybody Wants to Rule the World"	Roland Orzabal, Ian Stanley, Chris Hughes	Tears for Fears	4:14
3.	"Subdivisions"	Geddy Lee, Alex Lifeson, Neil Peart	Rush	5:28
4.	"Your Love"	John Spinks	The Outfield	3:42
5.	"Misunderstanding"	Phil Collins	Genesis	3:34
6.	"Rock with You"	Rod Temperton	Michael Jackson	3:43
7.	"Madrigal"	Lee, Lifeson, Peart	Rush	2:35
8.	"The Burning Down"	Doug Pinnick, Ty Tabor, Jerry Gaskill	King's X	2:24
9.	"Jump"	Eddie Van Halen, Alex Van Halen, Michael Anthony, David Lee Roth	Van Halen	3:54
10.	"We Close Our Eyes"	Danny Elfman	Oingo Boingo	4:37
11.	"The Last Unicorn"	Jimmy Webb	America	2:48
12.	"Wish You Were Here"	David Gilmour, Roger Waters	Pink Floyd	4:58
Total length:				45:50

== Personnel ==
Ninja Sex Party

- Dan Avidan – lead and backing vocals
- Brian Wecht – keyboards, piano, synthesizer and programming

Additional personnel

- Tupper Ware Remix Party – backup band
  - Lord Phobos – guitar
  - Commander Meouch – bass guitar
  - Doctor Sung – keytar
  - Havve Hogan – drums
- Super Guitar Bros – acoustic guitar ("Wish You Were Here")

=== Production ===
Bed tracks for the album were recorded by Thomas D'Arcy at Taurus Recording in Toronto, ON. The album's seventh and eleventh tracks were mixed by Dan Castellani, Jr. at Galactic Music and Audio, while the other tracks were mixed by Colin Crowell. Audio mastering for the album was completed by Kristian Montano at the Lacquer Channel Mastering recording studio, located in Toronto, Ontario. Its CD copies were manufactured and printed in Pennsauken, New Jersey by the company Disc Makers.

- Jim Arsenault – producer
- Brent Lilley – producer, engineering
- Brian Wecht – production
- Thomas D'Arcy – engineer

== Charts ==
Chart (2016)	Peak position
Canadian Albums (Billboard)	73
Australian Albums (ARIA)	82
UK Albums (OCC)	150
US Billboard 200	17
US Independent Albums (Billboard)	2
US Rock Albums (Billboard)	3
US Top Album Sales (Billboard)	9
US Digital Albums (Billboard)	14
