= Steel Panther =

American rock band

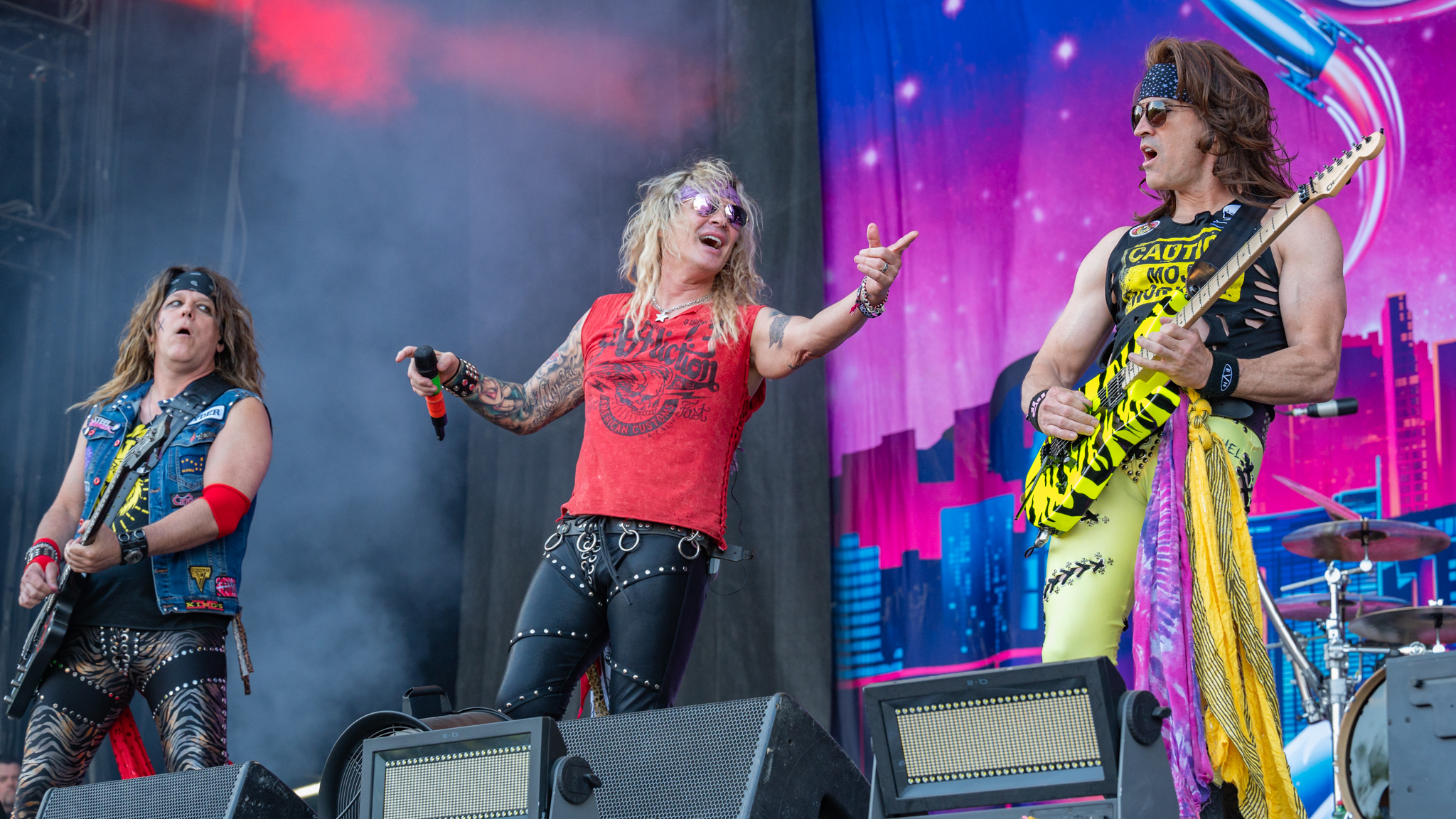
- Steel Panther at Rock im Park in 2023. Left to right: Spyder, Michael Starr and Satchel

Background information
- Also known as: Metal Shop (2000–2003); Danger Kitty (2003); Metal Skool (2003–2008)
- Origin: Los Angeles, California, U.S.
- Genres: Glam metal; comedy rock; heavy metal; hard rock
- Years active: 1997–present
- Labels: Republic; Open E; Kobalt
- Members: Michael Starr; Satchel; Stix Zadinia; Spyder
- Past members: Lexxi Foxx; Ray Luzier
- Website: steelpanther.com

Steel Panther is an American comedic glam metal band from Los Angeles, California. Fronted by lead singer Michael Starr, the band formed in 1997 and in 2000 became Metal Shop and was also known as Metal Skool before adopting the name Steel Panther in 2008. The band is known for its profane and humorous lyrics, and for parodying the stereotypical glam metal lifestyle.

== History ==
=== Metal Shop / Metal Skool (1997–2007) ===
The quartet began to gain popularity on the Sunset Strip during the early 2000s under the name Metal Shop (soon changed into Metal Skool, then into Steel Panther). Their original lineup consisted of lead vocalist Ralph Saenz ("Michael Starr"), guitarist Russ Parrish ("Satchel"), bassist Travis Haley ("Lexxi Foxx") and drummer Ray Luzier until he was replaced in 2003 by Darren Leader ("Stix Zadinia"). The band did weekly shows on Monday nights at the Viper Room, and subsequently the Key Club, playing covers of hair metal hits while sharing their passion for the bands that made the songs famous. Despite the name changes and Saenz and Parrish putting in time in the Van Halen tribute band Atomic Punks, they finally managed to gain some success. In 2003, they released Hole Patrol, their self-produced debut extended play. The band appeared in a Discover Card advertisement as Danger Kitty and in the sitcom Drew Carey Show as themselves. Also in 2003, their song "Death to All But Metal" was included in a compilation CD called Hey, That's What I Call Sludge! Vol. 1 put out by the Metal Sludge web site. Their cover of the song "Fantasy" by Aldo Nova was used as the opening musical theme for the MTV program Rob Dyrdek's Fantasy Factory. On November 27, 2007 Metal Skool played original songs as well as covers of KISS songs at the Gene Simmons roast; they can be seen in the background of Gene Simmons' reality show Gene Simmons Family Jewels. That year, they also appeared as themselves on Las Vegas in the episode "The High Price of Gas".

=== Feel the Steel (2008–2010) ===
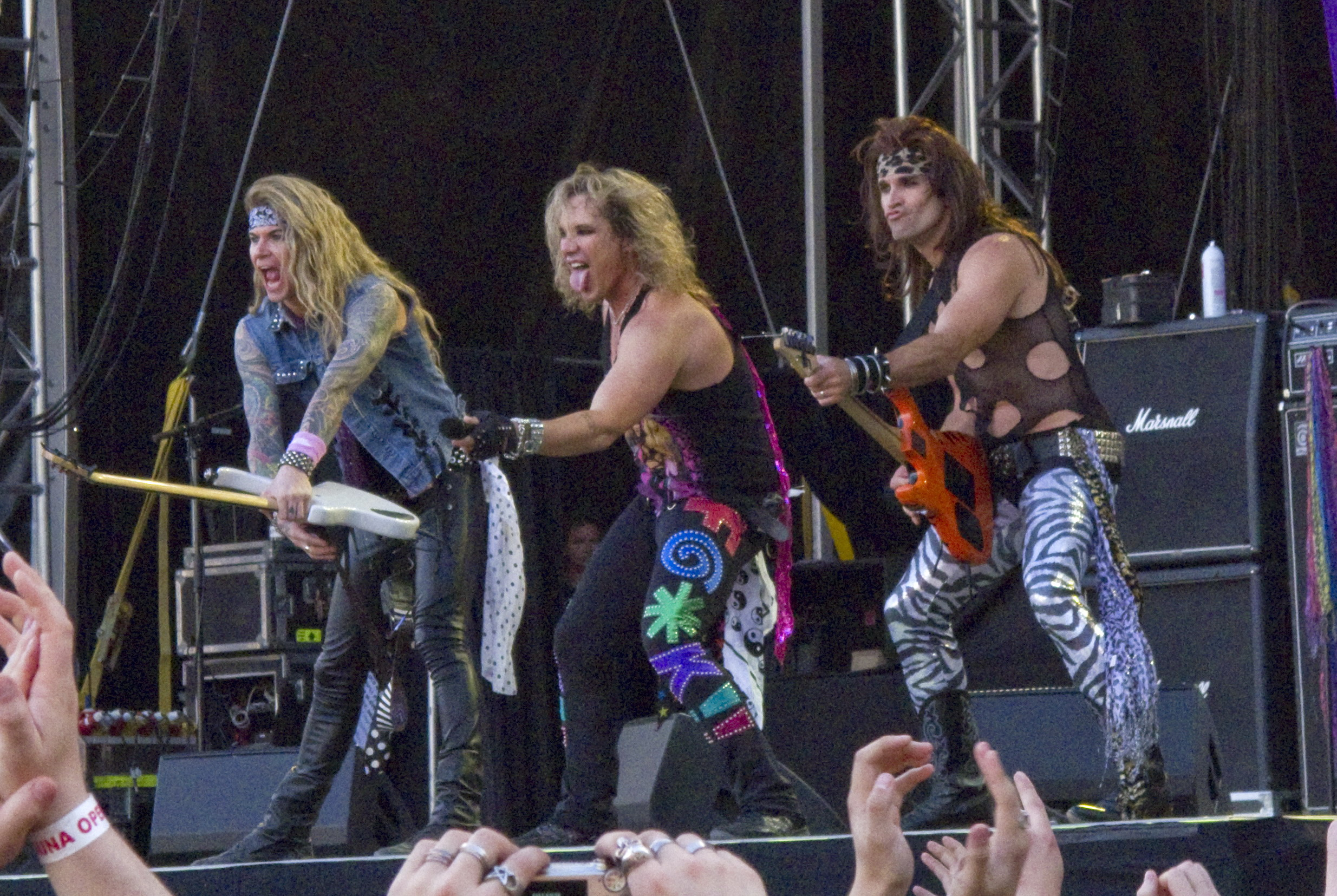
Steel Panther performing at the 2010 Sauna Open Air Metal Festival in Tampere, Finland

In April 2008, the band changed their name from Metal Skool to Steel Panther, making a new debut at The Rockin' Saddle Club in Redlands, California. In an interview with Michael Starr, he states that the band's name wasn't inspired by Steel Dragon, the band with Zakk Wylde and Mark Wahlberg in the movie Rock Star (in which Starr makes a cameo appearance). In May 2008, the band signed a contract with Republic Records (owned by record label Universal Records) announcing plans for a new studio album.

Steel Panther released Feel the Steel on June 8, 2009 in the United Kingdom and on October 6, 2009 in North America through Universal Republic, making it their major record label debut. Feel the Steel debuted at No. 1 on the Billboard Comedy chart, No. 123 on the Billboard 200 chart and would eventually peak at No. 98 on the Billboard 200 chart. The record features hit singles, "Community Property" and "Death to All but Metal" as well as notable guest vocal performances from Corey Taylor, Justin Hawkins, and M. Shadows. The track "Eyes of a Panther" is featured on the soundtrack for the video game Skate 3. Sometime collaborator Dean Cameron, also credited with co-writing "Supersonic Sex Machine" on the band's next album Balls Out, directed and co-wrote a pilot presentation in an attempt to land Steel Panther their own television program.

=== Balls Out and British Invasion (2011–2013) ===
Steel Panther released their second album Balls Out on October 31, 2011 in the UK and on November 1, 2011 in North America also through Universal Republic. Balls Out continued their revival of the heavy metal genre and debuted at No. 1 on the UK iTunes Rock chart surpassing Megadeth's TH1RT3EN and Lou Reed's and Metallica's Lulu. Balls Out also debuted at No. 4 on the US iTunes Rock chart, No. 40 on the Billboard 200 chart and at No. 1 on the Billboard Comedy chart with first-week sales of 12,000 copies in the US.

Due to their growing popularity, Steel Panther were invited by Def Leppard to join them and co-headliners Mötley Crüe as "Special Guests" on the Mirrorball Tour in December 2011. Exactly one week after ending the UK arena tour in London with Def Leppard and Mötley Crüe, Steel Panther opened for Guns N' Roses at the Forum in Los Angeles, CA on December 21, 2011.

On December 6, 2011, Steel Panther announced their second solo UK tour in support of their newest album Balls Out. Tickets for the shows went on sale on December 9, 2011, with many ticket providers selling out their allocations within a month. Brazzers sponsored the Australian tour of Steel Panther in early October 2012, which sold out in Brisbane, Sydney (two shows), Melbourne, and Adelaide. Another headline UK tour took place in November 2012. In late 2012, Steel Panther's European tour was crowned a huge success. They played sold-out shows, particularly in Germany.

Steel Panther released their first Live DVD British Invasion in September 2012. The DVD was released worldwide on October 22, 2012. The DVD was filmed at Brixton Academy in London and features a two-hour concert/documentary based on the band's sold-out British tour.

Steel Panther played on the main stage at Download Festival in June 2012, during which they were joined on stage by Corey Taylor of Slipknot to play "Death to All But Metal". Taylor wore wellies on stage. They played in front of a crowd of over 100,000 people. Steel Panther toured Australia in December 2013, supported by Buckcherry and Fozzy. Shows were sold out in Brisbane, Sydney, Melbourne, Adelaide and Perth between December 6 and 12.:

=== All You Can Eat (2014–2015) ===
In late 2013, Steel Panther announced a new tour in the year 2014, titled the "Spreading the Disease (S.T.D.) Tour". They toured Europe throughout February and March 2014. In support of their latest album, Steel Panther began touring North America in May 2014, their first headlining tour of America. In June, they moved the tour to Europe and continued to tour through August 2014.

The band released their third studio album All You Can Eat on April 1, 2014 on the independent label Open E Music, via Kobalt Label Services. The album was officially announced in September 2013. The first single from the album is "Party Like Tomorrow Is the End of the World". The second single, "The Burden of Being Wonderful", was released January 21, 2014.

The third single, "Gloryhole", was released in April 2014 on Steel Panther's VEVO channel. On March 26, 2014 the album was leaked online and available for downloading on various websites, most likely after being streamed by the German tabloid Bild. The online stream was approved by Steel Panther.

In June 2014, the band announced a short UK Tour with 4 dates scheduled for March 2015, supported by Skindred and The Lounge Kittens. The band sold out almost every venue on the tour, which included Wembley Arena, London. In April 2015, the group had a cameo in the music video for the Ninja Sex Party song "Road Trip" to tell of their sexual exploits that year. Michael Starr contributes vocals to "6969" on NSP's third album Attitude City as the head Dick Elder.

Steel Panther started a YouTube series called Steel Panther TV in Fall 2014 with segments like Science Panther, Love on the Rocks, Cineminute, World of Music, and Demolicious.

=== Lower the Bar and Heavy Metal Rules (2016–2021) ===
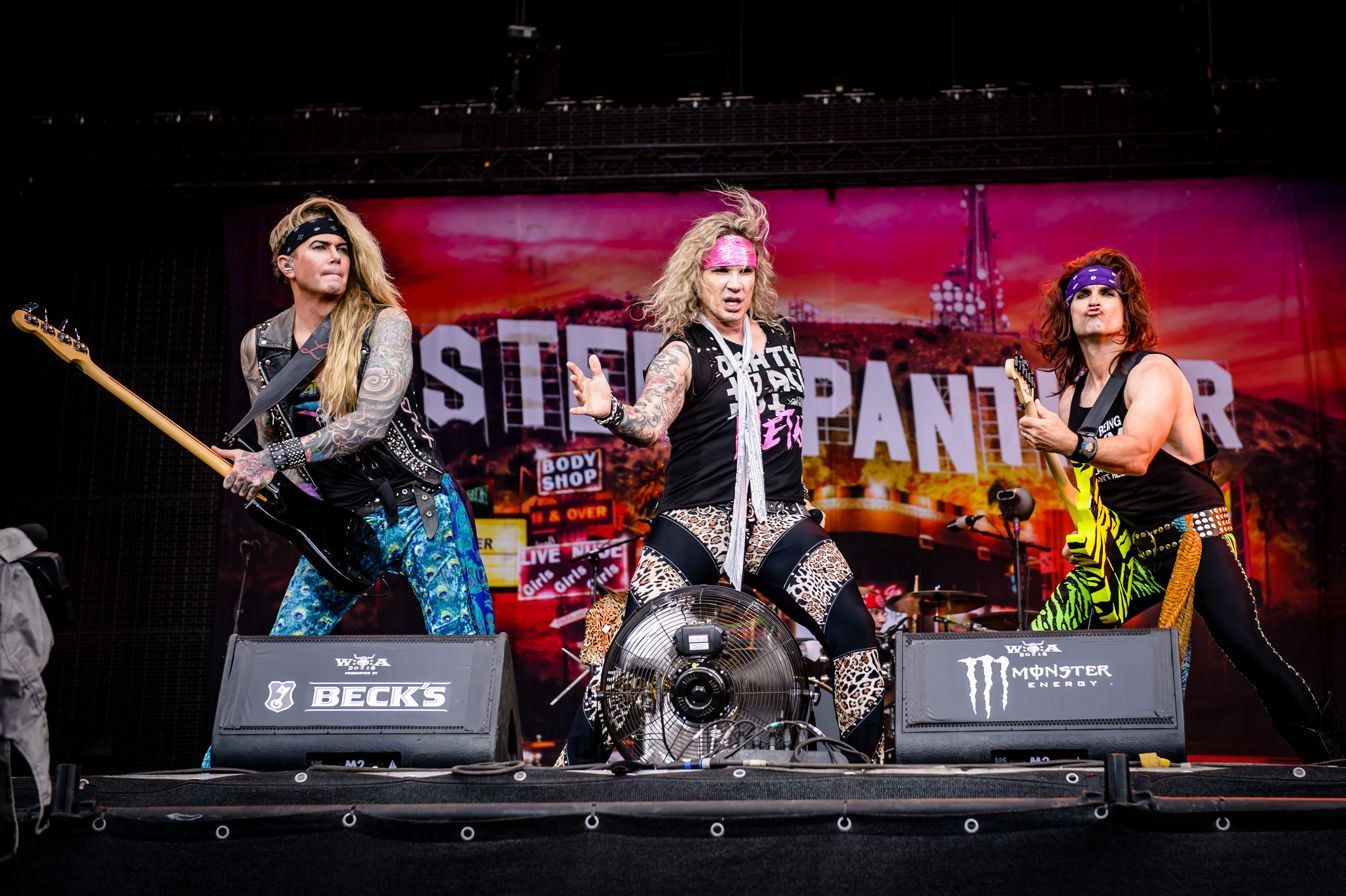
Steel Panther at Wacken Open Air 2018 in Germany

Steel Panther's acoustic album Live from Lexxi's Mom's Garage became available for pre-order on January 7, 2016, with the new song "That's When You Came In" preceding the album's release on February 26. The band went on the Adult Swim call-in show FishCenter Live to promote the album on January 22, 2016.

In September of the same year, Steel Panther released a cover of Cheap Trick's "She's Tight" with the announcement that their fourth studio album Lower the Bar would be released on March 24, 2017. Robin Zander and Bobbie Brown made cameo appearances in the music video for "She's Tight".

Their fifth album Heavy Metal Rules was announced in July 2019, and scheduled for a September 27, 2019 release. The music video for the first single from the album, "All I Wanna Do Is Fuck (Myself Tonight)", debuted on July 8, 2019. The second single titled, "Always Gonna Be a Ho", was released on August 9, 2019. The third single "Gods of Pussy" was released on September 6, 2019. Music videos for the title track, Fuck Everybody, and Let's Get High Tonight were also released on the band's YouTube channel though were not released as singles. In December 2020, they released "Fuck 2020" as a non-album single and music video. The song is an alternative version of "Fuck Everybody" from Heavy Metal Rules with new lyrics reflecting the COVID-19 pandemic. In March 2021, they released covers of the Van Halen classics "Beautiful Girls" and "D.O.A." as non-album singles. A video was released for the songs where they are in a video meeting setup reminiscent of Zoom.

=== New bassist, On the Prowl, and upcoming seventh studio album (2021–present) ===
In December 2018, the band announced that long-time bassist Lexxi Foxx would be missing the upcoming tour to go to "sex rehab". Foxx's stand-in was Joe "Spyder" Lester, the band's tour manager, as well as Starr and Satchel's former bandmate from The Atomic Punks. Lexxi returned to the band for the next tour, but still missed some dates, where he was filled in for by both Spyder and Tanner "T.K." Keegan.

In July 2021, it was revealed that Foxx had left the band. The band cited it was a mutual decision, jokingly stating that Foxx was pursuing his own business "Sexxy Lexxi's Prettiest Pets". In August, the band opened up virtual auditions for a new bass player. The band introduced new touring bassist Rikki Dazzle in October 2021, though Michael Starr revealed the band were still looking for a permanent member. In December, the band launched the "Road to the Road" promotion, featuring a bracket of 32 selected auditions to narrow down to a field of 10 finalists. The pre-selected finalists included Dazzle and Rikki Thrash (who would both tour with the band in November and December), as well as Spyder; in September of 2022, Spyder was selected as the new full-time bassist for the band.

The band's self-produced sixth studio album, On The Prowl, was released in 2023. Also in 2023, Steel Panther had a successful audition for America's Got Talent.

In October 2024, Feel the Steel was certified Gold in the UK, after reaching 100,000 copies sold.

The band is currently working on a new studio album, with hopes of releasing the material in 2026.

== Band members ==
Current

- Ralph "Michael Starr" Saenz – lead vocals, acoustic guitar (1997–present)
- Russ "Satchel" Parrish – guitars, backing vocals (1997–present)
- Darren "Stix Zadinia" Leader – drums, percussion, keyboards, piano, backing vocals (2003–present)
- Joe "Spyder" Lester – bass, backing vocals (2021–present; touring substitute 2018, 2019, 2021)

Former

- Travis "Lexxi Foxx" Haley – bass, backing vocals (1997–2021)
- Ray Luzier – drums, percussion (1997–2003)

Touring

- Tanner "T.K." Keegan – bass, backing vocals (2019, 2022)
- Phil "Silk Pockett" Buckman – bass, backing vocals (2021)
- Rikki Dazzle – bass, backing vocals (2021–2022)
- Sam "Rikki Thrash" Dobbs – bass, backing vocals (2021–2022)
- Tavis "Tracii Boom Boom Thunders" Stanley – bass, backing vocals (2022)

== Discography ==
Studio albums

- Feel the Steel (2009)
- Balls Out (2011)
- All You Can Eat (2014)
- Lower the Bar (2017)
- Heavy Metal Rules (2019)
- On the Prowl (2023)

== Videography ==
- Fat Girl (Thar She Blows) – The Video (2005) – home DVD featuring the music video for the title track and behind-the-scenes footage.
- Behind the Music: Steel Panther (2009) – iTunes podcast featuring a fake Behind the Music story for Steel Panther. (Features stars like Matt Sorum, Kat Von D, Jani Lane, Dee Snider and Dave Navarro)
- British Invasion (2012) first live release
- Live from Lexxi's Mom's Garage (2016) second live release

== Awards ==
- Best Debut: Feel the Steel – Metal Hammer Germany
- 2012 Live Act of the Year – Loudwire Music Awards
- 2013 Live Act of the Year – Loudwire Music Awards
- 2014 Video of the Year: "Party Like Tomorrow Is the End of the World" – Metal Hammer Golden Gods Awards

== See also ==
- Comedy rock
- Glam rock
- Hair metal
- Heavy metal genres
- Heavy metal music
- MTV
- Parody music
- Shock rock
