= On the Prowl (Steel Panther album) =

Studio album by Steel Panther
- Released: February 24, 2023
- Recorded: 2022
- Genre: Glam metal; comedy rock
- Length: 47:27
- Label: Steel Panther Inc.
- Producer: Steel Panther

Steel Panther chronology
Heavy Metal Rules (2019)	On the Prowl (2023)

Singles from On the Prowl
- 1. "Never Too Late (To Get Some Pussy Tonight)" Released: 2022; 2. "1987" Released: 2022; 3. "Friends With Benefits" Released: 2023

Professional ratings
Review scores
Source	Rating
Blabbermouth.net	8/10

On the Prowl is the sixth studio album by American glam metal band Steel Panther, released on February 24, 2023. This is the band's first album to feature new bassist Spyder.

== Track listing ==
On the Prowl track listing
No.	Title	Length
1.	"Never Too Late (To Get Some Pussy Tonight)"	4:00
2.	"Friends With Benefits"	3:54
3.	"On Your Instagram"	4:47
4.	"Put Your Money Where Your Mouth Is"	3:23
5.	"1987"	3:27
6.	"Teleporter"	3:59
7.	"Is My Dick Enough" (featuring Dweezil Zappa)	3:42
8.	"Magical Vagina"	3:50
9.	"All That and More"	4:35
10.	"One Pump Chump"	2:18
11.	"Pornstar"	3:39
12.	"Ain't Dead Yet"	3:25
13.	"Sleeping on the Rollaway"	2:28
Total length:		47:27

== Personnel ==
- Michael Starr – lead vocals, backing vocals
- Satchel – guitars, backing vocals, acoustic guitar
- Spyder – bass
- Stix Zadinia – drums, piano

== Charts ==
Chart performance for On the Prowl
Chart (2023)	Peak position
Austrian Albums (Ö3 Austria)	27
Belgian Albums (Ultratop Flanders)	153
German Albums (Offizielle Top 100)	32
Scottish Albums (OCC)	21
Swiss Albums (Schweizer Hitparade)	35
UK Album Downloads (OCC)	22
UK Independent Albums (OCC)	8
UK Rock & Metal Albums (OCC)	4
