= Feel the Steel =

Studio album by Steel Panther
- Released: June 8, 2009
- Recorded: 2008–2009
- Genre: Glam metal, heavy metal, comedy rock
- Length: 44:26
- Label: Universal Republic
- Producer: Jay Ruston

Steel Panther chronology
Hole Patrol (2003)	Feel the Steel (2009)	Balls Out (2011)

Singles from Feel the Steel
- 1. "Death to All but Metal" Released: January 26, 2009; 2. "Community Property" Released: June 2, 2009; 3. "Eyes of a Panther" Released: 2009

Feel the Steel is the debut studio album by American glam metal jokester band Steel Panther. It was released first in Europe on June 8, 2009, on Universal Republic Records. The tracks "Fat Girl", "Stripper Girl" and "Hell's on Fire" are re-recordings from the band's 2003 EP Hole Patrol (which was released under their old name Metal Shop) while "Death to All but Metal" is a re-recording from their 2004 contribution to the Metal Sludge compilation Hey That's What I Call Sludge! Vol. 1. Unlike the debut album and their Metal Sludge compilation tracks, Feel the Steel is composed entirely of songs, lacking any spoken word comedy skits present on earlier releases. The video for "Death to All but Metal" features comedian Sarah Silverman. The album debuted on #123 and peaked at #98 on the Billboard 200 chart and peaked at #1 on the Billboard Top Comedy Albums chart.

The album was released June 8, 2009, in the UK, October 6 in North America and December 11 in Australia.

== Reception ==
Professional ratings
Aggregate scores
Source	Rating
Metacritic	55/100
Review scores
Source	Rating
Allmusic	2.5/5 stars
BBC	(favorable)
Hot Press	(4/5)
The Independent	(favorable)
Kerrang!	4/5 stars
Mojo	3/5 stars
NME	(3/10)
Q	3/5 stars
Rock Sound	9/10 stars
Sputnikmusic	(4/5)

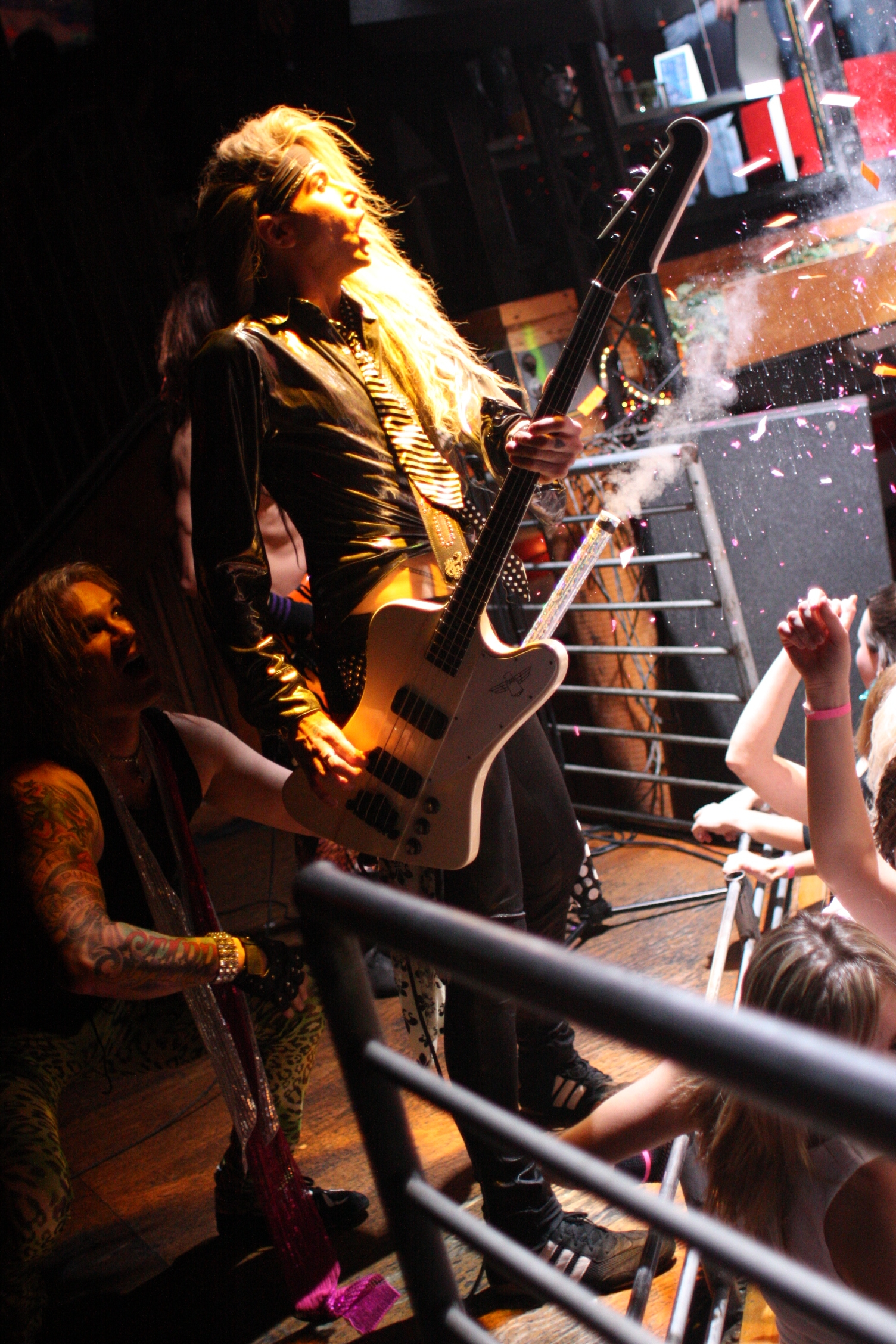
Ralph Saenz/Michael Starr (left) and Travis Haley/Lexxi Foxx (center) performing with Steel Panther in San Diego

Initial critical response to Feel the Steel was mixed. According to Metacritic, which assigns a normalized rating out of 100 to reviews from mainstream critics, the album has received a score of 57, based on four reviews. Negative reviews found the album unfunny by taking the jokes too far. Jason Lymangrover of Allmusic wrote that "Steel Panther's ability to create songs that sound like they came from 1987 is commendable. That's about as close to clever as it gets, though. As David St. Hubbins said, "It's such a fine line between stupid and clever," and Saenz's locker-room humor wears thin quickly."

Sophie Bruce of the BBC stated "Quite simply, Feel the Steel is an utter feelgood masterpiece." The Independent wrote that "it's essentially Spinal Tap/Bad News brought forward five years to the coked-up cock-rock era, complete with titles such as 'Eatin' Ain't Cheatin'' and dangerous levels of dumb-ass homophobia, sexism, racism and sizeism. The songs are at times terrifyingly authentic. Is it new? Don't be stupid. Is it funny? Hell yeah." NME placed the 2009 video for "Fat Girl", from this album, at number 41 on its list of the "50 worst music videos ever".

== Track listing ==
All tracks are written by Steel Panther, except "Girl from Oklahoma" by Steel Panther and Dean Cameron.

No.	Title	Length
1.	"Death to All but Metal" (featuring Corey Taylor)	2:30
2.	"Asian Hooker"	4:02
3.	"Community Property"	3:39
4.	"Eyes of a Panther"	3:37
5.	"Fat Girl (Thar She Blows)"	4:38
6.	"Eatin' Ain't Cheatin'"	3:51
7.	"Party All Day (Fuck All Night)" (featuring Justin Hawkins) (listed as "Party All Day" in the iTunes store and Spotify)	3:03
8.	"Turn Out the Lights" (featuring M. Shadows)	4:24
9.	"Stripper Girl"	3:35
10.	"The Shocker"	4:10
11.	"Girl from Oklahoma"	3:57
Total length:		41:24

Bonus tracks
No.	Title	Length
12.	"Hell's on Fire"	3:02
13.	"I Want Your Tits" (UK bonus track)	3:20
Total length:		47:46

15th Anniversary Edition bonus tracks
No.	Title	Writer(s)	Length
12.	"You Don't Make Me Feel Dumb" (previously unreleased bonus track)	Steel Panther, Dean Cameron	4:43
13.	"I Want Your Tits" (UK bonus track)		3:20
Total length:			49:28

== Personnel ==
- Michael Starr – lead vocals, backing vocals
- Satchel – guitars, backing vocals, acoustic guitar, talkbox
- Lexxi Foxxx – bass, backing vocals
- Stix Zadinia – drums, backing vocals

=== Additional musicians ===
- Justin Hawkins – co-lead vocals (track 7)
- M. Shadows – co-lead vocals (8)
- Allison Robertson – lead guitar (7)
- Scott Ian – rhythm guitar (2)
- Ray Luzier – drums (2)
- Corey Taylor – co-lead vocals (1) backing vocals (2 and 4)
- Matthew Nelson – backing vocals (4, 5, 6 and 10)
- Brett Anderson – backing vocals (4)
- Joe Lester – backing vocals (3, 5, 6 and 10)
- Rene Ruston – female voice (6)
- Michael Lord – orchestration (3)

== Charts ==
Chart (2009)	Peak position
Japanese Albums (Oricon)	38
Scottish Albums (OCC)	45
UK Albums (OCC)	52
UK Rock & Metal Albums (OCC)	3
US Billboard 200	98
US Top Hard Rock Albums (Billboard)	14
US Top Rock Albums (Billboard)	42

== Certifications ==
Region	Certification	Certified units/sales
United Kingdom (BPI)	Gold	100,000^{‡}
^{‡} Sales+streaming figures based on certification alone.

== Release history ==
Country	Date
Europe	June 8, 2012
Japan	August 5, 2009
United States	October 6, 2009
Scandinavia	November 16, 2009
Australia	December 11, 2009
