= Lower the Bar =

Studio album by Steel Panther
- Released: March 24, 2017
- Recorded: 2016
- Genre: Glam metal, comedy rock
- Length: 39:13
- Label: Open E Music, Kobalt
- Producer: Jay Ruston

Steel Panther chronology
All You Can Eat (2014)	Lower the Bar (2017)	Heavy Metal Rules (2019)

Singles from Lower the Bar
- 1. "She's Tight" Released: September 29, 2016; 2. "Anything Goes" Released: December 16, 2016; 3. "Poontang Boomerang" Released: February 9, 2017; 4. "I Got What You Want" Released: 2017

Professional ratings
Review scores
Source	Rating
Classic Rock	3.5/5 stars
Classic Rock Germany	6/10 stars
Metal Hammer	6/7 stars
Metal Hammer UK	3.5/5 stars
Rock Hard	8.5/10 stars

Lower the Bar is the fourth studio album by American glam metal band Steel Panther. It was originally scheduled for release on February 24, 2017, but was delayed to the following month.

Robin Zander and Bobbie Brown made cameo appearances in the music video for Cheap Trick's cover "She's Tight".

== Track listing ==
All tracks are written by Steel Panther, except "She's Tight" written by Rick Nielsen.

No.	Title	Length
1.	"Goin' in the Backdoor"	3:10
2.	"Anything Goes"	3:01
3.	"Poontang Boomerang"	3:22
4.	"That's When You Came In"	3:46
5.	"Wrong Side of the Tracks (Out in Beverly Hills)"	3:07
6.	"Now the Fun Starts"	3:43
7.	"Pussy Ain't Free"	3:56
8.	"Wasted Too Much Time" (featuring Stone Sour in the video)	3:50
9.	"I Got What You Want"	4:13
10.	"Walk of Shame"	4:11
11.	"She's Tight" (Cheap Trick cover; featuring Robin Zander)	2:54
Total length:		39:13

Deluxe CD bonus tracks
No.	Title	Length
12.	"Red Headed Step Child"	3:40
13.	"Momentary Epiphany"	2:57
Total length:		46:00

Japanese bonus track
No.	Title	Length
14.	"Gloryhole (Live from Wacken 2016)"

== Personnel ==
- Michael Starr – lead vocals, backing vocals
- Satchel – guitars, backing vocals, acoustic guitar
- Lexxi Foxx – bass, backing vocals
- Stix Zadinia – drums, backing vocals, piano

=== Additional musicians ===
- Chris Catton – backing vocals (track 9)
- Michael Catton – backing vocals (track 9)
- Rudy Sarzo – bass (track 5)
- Michael Lord – piano (track 13)

== Charts ==
Chart (2017)	Peak position
Australian Albums (ARIA)	10
Austrian Albums (Ö3 Austria)	15
Belgian Albums (Ultratop Flanders)	28
Belgian Albums (Ultratop Wallonia)	65
Canadian Albums (Billboard)	39
French Albums (SNEP)	127
German Albums (Offizielle Top 100)	14
New Zealand Heatseekers Albums (RMNZ)	10
Scottish Albums (OCC)	16
Swiss Albums (Schweizer Hitparade)	30
UK Albums (OCC)	26
UK Album Downloads (OCC)	12
UK Independent Albums (OCC)	4
UK Rock & Metal Albums (OCC)	2
US Billboard 200	40
US Top Comedy Albums (Billboard)	1
