= Parody music =

Composition technique

Parody music, or musical parody, involves changing or copying existing (usually well known) musical ideas, and/or lyrics, or copying the particular style of a composer or performer, or even a general style of music.

In music, parody has been used for many different purposes and in various musical contexts: as a serious compositional technique, as an unsophisticated re-use of well-known melody to present new words, and as an intentionally humorous, even mocking, reworking of existing musical material, sometimes for satirical effect.

Examples of musical parody with completely serious intent include parody masses in the 16th century, and, in the 20th century, the use of folk tunes in popular song, and neo-classical works written for the concert hall, drawing on earlier styles. "Parody" in this serious sense continues to be a term in musicological use, existing alongside the more common use of the term to refer to parody for humorous effect.

== Etymology ==
The word "parody" derives from the post-classical Latin parodia, which came from the Greek παρῳδία (lit. 'burlesque poem/song').

== History ==
=== Renaissance ===
The earliest musical application of this Greek term was only in 1587, on the title-page of a parody mass by the German composer Jakob Paix, as the equivalent of the previously usual Latin expressions missa ad imitationem or missa super …, which were used to acknowledge the source of borrowed musical material. Such preferences for Greek terms were a product of Renaissance humanism, which was strong in Germany by that time though the word's use was infrequent and casual. It was only in modern times that the term "parody technique" came into general use as a historical musicological term, especially after the publication of Peter Wagner’s Geschichte der Messe in 1913. Although the practice of borrowing preexisting polyphonic textures dates back to the 14th century, these earlier manifestations are closer to the technique of contrafactum than to the parody of 16th-century music. In the latter part of the 15th century, composers began to include the other voices of a polyphonic model in basically cantus firmus structures, such as Jacob Obrecht's Missa Fortuna desperata and Missa Rosa playsante. In Grove's Dictionary of Music and Musicians, Michael Tilmouth and Richard Sherr write of the genre:

The essential feature of parody technique is that not merely a single part is appropriated to form a cantus firmus in the derived work, but the whole substance of the source – its themes, rhythms, chords and chord progressions – is absorbed into the new piece and subjected to free variation in such a way that a fusion of old and new elements is achieved.

Many of the most famous composers of the 16th century, including Victoria, Lassus and Palestrina, used a wide range of earlier music in their masses, drawing on existing secular as well as religious pieces. (Note: During the Renaissance, a prevailing view of the balance between originality and homage to earlier artists was summed up by Sir Philip Sidney in his Defence of Poesy as "Art, Imitation and Exercise". Art, one's personal skills and talents, was expected to follow Imitation, the life or works of great predecessors, and the two must combine in Exercise, the synthesis of Art and Imitation.)

=== Baroque ===
After the beginning of the Baroque period, there continued to be parodies with serious intent. Examples include J. S. Bach's reuse of three cantatas in his Christmas Oratorio, and of many movements in the Mass in B Minor, which, to a large extent, he compiled from his own prior works. Bach frequently and systematically did this, parodying his own occasional works to preserve them for more frequent use.

As musical fashions changed, however, there was little cause to re-use old modal tunes and compositional styles. After the middle of the 17th century, composers sought to create "a unique musical treatment appropriate to the text and the circumstances of performance". Thereafter the serious parody became rare until the 20th century.

=== Concert works and opera ===
The parodic elements of Bach's "Cantate burlesque", Peasant Cantata are humorous in intent, making fun of the florid da capo arias then in fashion. Thereafter "parody" in music has generally been associated with humorous or satiric treatment of borrowed or imitative material. Later in the 18th century, Mozart parodied the lame melodies and routine forms of lesser composers of his day in his Musical Joke. A century later, Saint-Saëns composed The Carnival of the Animals as a musical joke for his friends; several of the movements contain musical parody, radically changing the tempo and instrumentation of well-known melodies. (Note: "Tortoises dancing to Offenbach's Orpheus in the Underworld at an agonisingly slow pace; the Elephant who artfully transfers Berlioz' Dance of the Sylphs to the ponderous double bass, for a truly elephantine character".) Bartók's Concerto for Orchestra (1943) features the appearance (followed by a trombone raspberry) of a theme from Shostakovich's Leningrad Symphony. (Note: In 1942, Bartók listened to the first broadcast performance of the symphony, "and was struck both by the endless repetitions of the first movement's main theme ... and by the resemblance of part of that theme to a Viennese cabaret song of his acquaintance. This is what 'interrupts' the otherwise tranquil and expressive 'Intermezzo': the ironic point being that Bartók treats the 'interruption' in precisely what is the harshly satirical, sarcastic, circus-ring manner of Shostakovich himself in other contexts.")

In theatrical music, the 18th century ballad opera, which included satirical songs set to popular melodies of the time, involved some of the broadest musical parodies. In Così fan tutte Mozart parodied the elaborate solemnities of opera seria arias. His own The Magic Flute was the subject of Viennese parodies in the decades after his death. Parodies of Wagner range from Souvenirs de Bayreuth by Fauré and Messager (sending up music from the Ring cycle by turning the themes into dance rhythm) to Anna Russell's Introduction to the Ring, which parodies the words and music of the cycle by presenting their supposed absurdities in a mock-academic lecture format. (Note: For example: "Hagen gives Siegfried a magic potion that makes him forget all about Brünnhilde and fall in love with Gutrune Gibich, who, by the way, is the only woman Siegfried has ever come across who hasn't been his aunt – I'm not making this up, you know!")

Offenbach, a frequent parodist (of among others Gluck, Donizetti and Meyerbeer), was himself parodied by later composers from Saint-Saëns to Sondheim. In the Savoy operas, Sullivan parodied the styles of Handel, Bellini, Mozart, Verdi and others. His own music has been parodied ever since. The parodic use of well-known tunes with new lyrics is a common feature of Victorian burlesque and pantomime, British theatrical styles popularised in the 19th century.

Serious parody was revived, in modified form, in the 20th century, with such works as Prokoviev's Classical Symphony and Stravinsky's neo-classical works including The Fairy's Kiss and Pulcinella. However, Tilmouth and Sherr comment that although these works exhibit "the kind of interaction of composer and model that was characteristic of 16th-century parody", they nevertheless employ "a stylistic dichotomy far removed from it". The same authors comment that the use of old music in the scores of Peter Maxwell Davies similarly "engenders a conflict foreign to the total synthesis that was the aim of 16th-century parody".

== Parody in popular music ==
Popular music has used parody in a variety of ways. These include parodies of earlier music, for comic or (sometimes) serious effect; parodies of musical and performing styles; and parodies of particular performers.

Before the 20th century, popular song frequently borrowed hymn tunes and other church music and substituted secular words. "John Brown's Body", the marching song of the American Civil War, was based on the tune of an earlier camp-meeting and revival hymn, and was later fitted with the words "Mine eyes have seen the glory of the coming of the Lord", by Julia Ward Howe. This practice continued into the First World War, with many of the soldiers' songs being based on hymn tunes (for instance "When this lousy war is over", to the tune of "What a Friend We Have in Jesus" and "We are Fred Karno's Army", to the tune of "The Church's One Foundation").

Folk song has often been written to existing tunes, or slight modifications of them. This is another very old (and usually non-humorous) kind of musical parody that still continues. For instance, Bob Dylan took the tune of the old slave song "No more auction block for me" as the basis for "Blowin' in the Wind".

=== Parodies of earlier works in popular music ===
In the 1940s Spike Jones and his City Slickers parodied popular music in their own way, not by changing lyrics, but adding wild sound effects and comedic stylings to formerly staid old songs. The 1957 Broadway musical Jamaica parodied the then very fashionable commercial variety of Calypso music. A musical using heavy parody was the 1959 show Little Mary Sunshine, which poked fun at old-fashioned operetta.

Parodists of music from the concert hall or lyric theatre have included Allan Sherman, known for adding comic words to existing works by such composers as Ponchielli and Sullivan; and Tom Lehrer, who has parodied Sullivan, folk music, ragtime and Viennese operetta. The pianist Victor Borge is also noted for parodies of classical and operatic works.

The musical satirist Peter Schickele created P. D. Q. Bach, a supposedly newly discovered member of the Bach family, whose creative output parodies musicological scholarship, the conventions of Baroque and classical music, as well as introducing elements of slapstick comedy.

=== Parodies of performing styles and performers ===
Stan Freberg created parodies of popular songs in the 1950s and 1960s, mocking the musical conventions of the day, such as his cover of Elvis Presley's "Heartbreak Hotel" where he complains of "too much echo". The bandleader and pianist Paul Weston and his wife, singer Jo Stafford, created the musical duo, "Jonathan and Darlene Edwards", as a parody of bad cabaret acts. The British group The Barron Knights became famous for their parodies of pop performers in the 1970s, whilst The Bar-Steward Sons of Val Doonican currently perform comedy parodies of popular songs from a wide of genres primarily on folk instruments.

Parodists with differing techniques have included "Weird Al" Yankovic and Bob Rivers, who have generally put new lyrics to largely unchanged music, and Richard Cheese and Lounge Against the Machine or The Lounge Kittens keeps the lyrics intact but alters the musical style, performing rap, metal, and rock songs in a lounge style. Country Yossi, a pioneering composer and singer in the Jewish music genre, reworks the lyrics of country music and other mainstream hits to convey Orthodox Jewish themes. Another example of musical parody is Mac Sabbath, a Black Sabbath tribute band who utilize McDonald's-themed props and costumes with altered lyrics satirizing the fast food industry. Parody in the 21st century has included the 2005 musical Altar Boyz, which parodies both Christian rock and the "boy band" style of pop.

== See also ==
- Comedy rock
- Composer tributes (classical music)
- Mashup
- Soramimi
- Pastiche
- Victorian burlesque

== Notes and references ==
Notes

Sources

- Boyd, Malcolm (2000). Bach. Oxford and New York: Oxford University Press. ISBN 0-19-514222-5.
- Hughes, Gervase (1959). The Music of Sir Arthur Sullivan. London: Macmillan. OCLC 500626743.
- Kimbrough, Robert (1983). Sir Philip Sidney: selected prose and poetry. Madison, Wisconsin: University of Wisconsin Press. ISBN 0-299-09130-9.
