= A Small Deadly Space =

Studio album by Fight
- Released: April 18, 1995
- Genre: Groove metal
- Length: 54:39
- Label: Epic
- Producer: Attie Bauw and Rob Halford

Fight chronology
War of Words (1993)	A Small Deadly Space (1995)

Alternative cover
- 2008 Remixed and Remastered edition cover

Singles from A Small Deadly Space
- 1. "Blowout in the Radio Room" Released: April 4, 1995; 2. "I Am Alive" Released: 1995

Rob Halford chronology
War of Words (1993)	A Small Deadly Space (1995)	Voyeurs (1998)

Professional ratings
Review scores
Source	Rating
AllMusic	4/5 stars
Collector's Guide to Heavy Metal	7/10
Rock Hard	7.5/10

A Small Deadly Space is the second and final studio album by heavy metal band Fight, released in April 1995. The album exudes a much darker and grungier sound than War of Words. A music video was made for "Blowout in the Radio Room".

== Track listing ==
Lyrics written by Rob Halford and Brian Tilse except where noted.

No.	Title	Writer(s)	Length
1.	"I Am Alive"		4:56
2.	"Mouthpiece"	Halford, Mark Chaussee	3:22
3.	"Legacy of Hate"	Halford, Tilse, Chaussee	4:34
4.	"Blowout in the Radio Room"		4:10
5.	"Never Again"	Halford, Tilse, Scott Travis	3:51
6.	"Small Deadly Space"	Halford, Chaussee, Travis	5:19
7.	"Gretna Greene"	Halford, Tilse, Chaussee	3:52
8.	"Beneath the Violence"	Halford, Tilse, Travis	4:43
9.	"Human Crate"		6:09
10.	"In a World of My Own Making: I. "(no audio)" – 2:00; II. "Psycho Suicide" (Hidden Track) – 4:37"		13:43

Japanese edition bonus track
No.	Title	Writer(s)	Length
11.	"Acid Test" (Instrumental)	Tilse, Travis	5:43

== 2008 Remixed and Remastered edition ==
No.	Title	Writer(s)	Length
1.	"Beneath the Violence"	Rob Halford, Brian Tilse, Scott Travis	4:43
2.	"Legacy of Hate"	Halford, Tilse, Mark Chaussee	4:34
3.	"Never Again"	Halford, Tilse, Travis	3:51
4.	"Mouthpiece"	Halford, Chaussee	3:22
5.	"I Am Alive"		4:56
6.	"Small Deadly Space"	Halford, Chaussee, Travis	5:19
7.	"Gretna Greene"	Halford, Tilse, Chaussee	3:52
8.	"Human Crate"		6:09
9.	"Blowout in the Radio Room"		4:10
10.	"In a World of My Own Making"		7:00

== Notes ==
- "In a World of My Own Making" is a 7:06 song. A 2-minute silence occurs before a hidden track titled "Psycho Suicide" is played. It is included in the Japanese edition, but is not listed. It is not included in the remixed and remastered edition
- The remixed and remastered edition features a different track order. "Beneath the Violence" features a different vocal take with occasional different lyrics

== Personnel ==
Fight

- Rob Halford – vocals
- Brian Tilse – guitars, piano
- Mark Chaussee – guitars
- Jay Jay – bass
- Scott Travis – drums

Production

- Produced by Attie Bauw and Rob Halford
- Executive producer – John Baxter
- Recorded by Attie Bauw

2008 Remixed and Remastered Edition

- Remixed by Roy Z
- Remastered by Maor Appelbaum
- Art design – Marc Sasso

== Charts ==
Chart (1995)	Peak position
Swedish Albums (Sverigetopplistan)	48
UK Rock & Metal Albums (OCC)	23
US Billboard 200	120
