= Heavy Metal Rules =

Studio album by Steel Panther
- Released: September 27, 2019
- Recorded: 2018–2019
- Genre: Glam metal, comedy rock
- Length: 35:55
- Label: Steel Panther Inc.
- Producer: Jay Ruston; Steel Panther

Steel Panther chronology
Lower the Bar (2017)	Heavy Metal Rules (2019)	On the Prowl (2023)

Singles from Heavy Metal Rules
- 1. "All I Wanna Do Is Fuck (Myself Tonight)" Released: 2019; 2. "Always Gonna Be a Ho" Released: August 9, 2019; 3. "Gods of Pussy" Released: 2019

Professional ratings
Review scores
Source	Rating
Blabbermouth.net	7.5/10
Kerrang!	2/5
Metal Hammer	2/5 stars
NME	1/5 stars
Ultimate Guitar	7.7/10

Heavy Metal Rules is the fifth studio album by American glam metal band Steel Panther, released on September 27, 2019. This is the band's last album to feature bassist Lexxi Foxx.

== Background ==
During the recording of the album, vocalist Michael Starr was diagnosed with nodules of the vocal chords, and had to undergo surgery to remove them which put the album on hold for several months. The album is named after the "philosophy" of the "Zebraman" from the 1986 documentary film Heavy Metal Parking Lot.

== Critical reception ==
Heavy Metal Rules received generally mixed to negative reviews from critics, being criticized for its lyrics and overall lack of refreshment, being called unfunny and repetitive. However, the band's performances, particularly the guitars and the drums, were praised. NME's Jordan Bassett gave the album a wholly negative review, awarding the album one star out of five and stated that the band is "not funny", summarizing that their "gag involves dumb guitar riffs and even dumber lyrics about sex, babes and metal" and describing it as "gleeful misogyny" and "incel rock". Bassett concluded by writing that "If you have never had sex, you might like this album. [...] It's only got one star because the NME content management system doesn't currently support 0 stars." Giving the album a score of two out of five, Luke Morton of Kerrang! felt that the band "continue to run the joke into the ground" on the album, opining that their "glam parody shtick is stale" and calling the album largely "forgettable". Writing for Metal Hammer, Adam Reese rated the album two stars out of five and said that the album features "more swears than songs", writing that the band's "impact has begun to diminish over recent releases". Although highlighting the "tasty riffs" on "Always Gonna Be a Ho" and the "batter[ing]" on the songs "All I Wanna Do Is Fuck (Myself Tonight)" and "Fuck Everybody", Rees concluded that "Heavy metal does indeed rule, as do an on-form Steel Panther, but album five isn't the best case for either."

A positive review came from Dom Lawson of Blabbermouth.net, who gave the album 7.5 out of 10 and wrote that "rather than battling with the law of diminishing comic returns, the band's musical brilliance and irrepressible sense of mischief has pushed them to make their finest record in a decade". Reviewing the album for Ultimate-Guitar.com, Travis Lausch judged that while the band continue "to be unrepentant against the political correctness grain", "when taken as a parody of 80s hair metal with tongue firmly planted in cheek [...] they can actually come off as quite entertaining, and there's no denying one basic fact about this band: [they] can play." In conclusion, Lausch felt that "There's a lot to love for fans of shred guitar, hair metal riffing, and musical debauchery, overall."

Loudwire named it one of the 50 best metal albums of 2019.

== Track listing ==
No.	Title	Length
1.	"Zebraman"	0:34
2.	"All I Wanna Do Is Fuck (Myself Tonight)"	3:53
3.	"Let's Get High Tonight"	3:48
4.	"Always Gonna Be a Ho"	4:20
5.	"I'm Not Your Bitch"	4:04
6.	"Fuck Everybody"	3:40
7.	"Heavy Metal Rules"	3:47
8.	"Sneaky Little Bitch"	4:28
9.	"Gods of Pussy"	3:51
10.	"I Ain't Buying What You're Selling"	3:30
Total length:		35:55

== Personnel ==
- Michael Starr – lead vocals, backing vocals
- Satchel – guitars, backing vocals, acoustic guitar
- Lexxi Foxx – bass
- Stix Zadinia – drums, piano
- Spyder – bass (On "I'm Not Your Bitch")

=== Technical personnel ===
- David Jackson – art direction, cover, photography (band)
- Trevor Niemann – design (packaging), layout
- Francesco Cameli – engineering
- John Douglass – additional engineering
- Alejandro Baima – assisted engineering
- Daniel Morris – assisted engineering
- Paul Logus – mastering
- Steel Panther – production
- Jay Ruston – production, engineering, mixing

== Charts ==
Chart (2019)	Peak position
Australian Albums (ARIA)	13
Austrian Albums (Ö3 Austria)	20
Belgian Albums (Ultratop Flanders)	98
Canadian Albums (Billboard)	57
German Albums (Offizielle Top 100)	32
Scottish Albums (OCC)	13
Swiss Albums (Schweizer Hitparade)	19
UK Albums (OCC)	43
US Billboard 200	131
