= All You Can Eat (Steel Panther album) =

Studio album by Steel Panther
- Released: April 1, 2014
- Recorded: 2013
- Genre: Glam metal, heavy metal, comedy rock
- Length: 48:09
- Label: Open E Music
- Producer: Jay Ruston, Steel Panther

Steel Panther chronology
Balls Out (2011)	All You Can Eat (2014)	Lower the Bar (2017)

Singles from All You Can Eat
- 1. "Party Like Tomorrow Is the End of the World" Released: October 29, 2013; 2. "The Burden of Being Wonderful" Released: January 21, 2014; 3. "Gloryhole" Released: March 18, 2014; 4. "Pussywhipped" Released: October 3, 2014; 5. "Fucking My Heart in the Ass" Released: April 2015

Professional ratings
Aggregate scores
Source	Rating
Metacritic	69/100
Review scores
Source	Rating
Allmusic	2/5 stars
Kerrang!	4/5 stars
Rock Sound	7/10
Uncut	3.5/5 stars

All You Can Eat is the third studio album by American glam metal band Steel Panther, released on April 1, 2014 on the independent label Open E Music via Kobalt Label Services. The album was officially announced September 2013. The first single from the album is "Party Like Tomorrow is the End of the World". The second single, "The Burden of Being Wonderful", was released January 21, 2014. The third single, "Gloryhole", was released in April 2014 on Steel Panther's VEVO channel.

On March 26, 2014 the album was leaked online and available for downloading on various websites, most likely after being streamed by the German tabloid Bild. The online stream was approved by Steel Panther.

The album's artwork is a parody of the mural painting The Last Supper by Leonardo da Vinci.

== Track listing ==
The track listing of All You Can Eat was announced on January 13, 2014.

No.	Title	Length
1.	"Pussywhipped"	4:37
2.	"Party Like Tomorrow Is the End of the World"	4:01
3.	"Gloryhole"	4:32
4.	"Bukkake Tears"	4:47
5.	"Gangbang at the Old Folks Home"	3:47
6.	"Ten Strikes You're Out"	3:24
7.	"The Burden of Being Wonderful"	3:29
8.	"Fucking My Heart in the Ass"	4:14
9.	"B.V.S."	3:57
10.	"You're Beautiful When You Don't Talk"	3:49
11.	"If I Was the King"	3:42
12.	"She's on the Rag"	3:50
Total length:		48:09

Japanese bonus track
No.	Title	Length
13.	"People Are Stoopid"	3:27
Total length:		51:36

iTunes bonus track
No.	Title	Length
13.	"She's on the Rag" (alternate version)	4:46
Total length:		52:55

== Personnel ==
Steel Panther

- Michael Starr – lead vocals
- Satchel – guitars, backing vocals, acoustic guitar
- Lexxi Foxx – bass, backing vocals
- Stix Zadinia – drums, backing vocals, piano

Additional musicians

- Vivian Campbell (of Def Leppard) – guitar solo on "Gangbang at the Old Folks Home"
- Kiara Ana Perico – Violin and viola on "The Burden of Being Wonderful"

Production

- Jay Ruston & Steel Panther – production
- Jay Ruston – engineering & mixing
- Nick Rucker – additional overdub engineering
- Ara Sarkasian – assistant engineer
- James Ingram – additional mix engineer & Pro Tools editor
- Paul Logus – Mastering at Taloowa Mastering, New York
- David Jackson – photography & art design

Recorded at Clear Lake Audio, Burbank, California. Overdubs mixed at TRS West, Sherman Oaks, California.

== Charts ==
Chart (2014–15)	Peak position
Australian Albums (ARIA)	2
Austrian Albums (Ö3 Austria)	13
Belgian Albums (Ultratop Flanders)	113
Canadian Albums (Billboard)	14
Dutch Albums (Album Top 100)	65
Finnish Albums (Suomen virallinen lista)	37
French Albums (SNEP)	116
German Albums (Offizielle Top 100)	15
Japanese Albums (Oricon)	102
New Zealand Albums (RMNZ)	34
Scottish Albums (OCC)	12
Swiss Albums (Schweizer Hitparade)	22
UK Albums (OCC)	12
UK Rock & Metal Albums (OCC)	1
US Billboard 200	24
US Top Hard Rock Albums (Billboard)	5
US Top Rock Albums (Billboard)	7
