= Satchel (musician) =

American guitarist

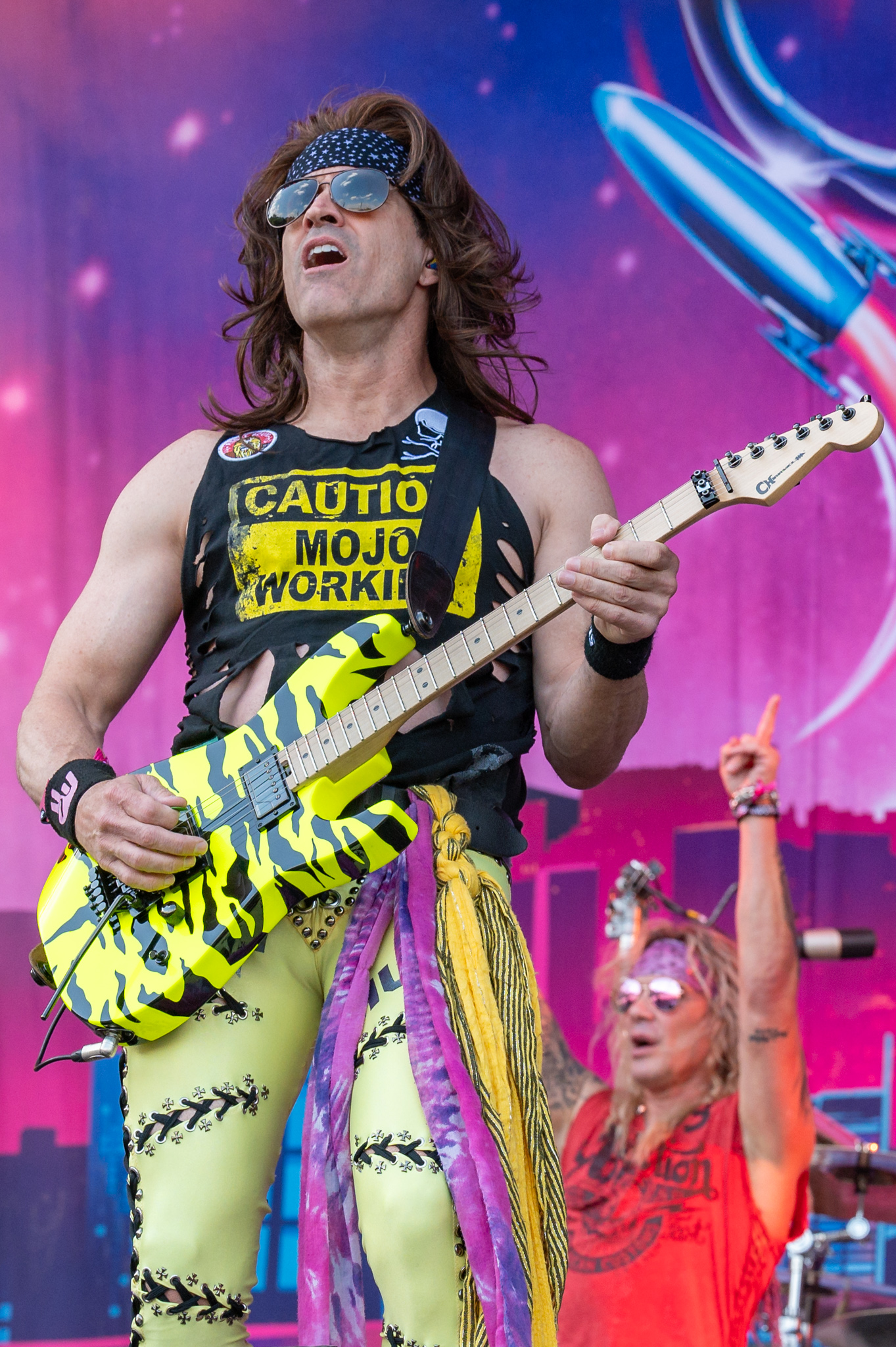
- Satchel performing with Steel Panther in 2023

Background information
- Also known as: Rikki Ratchet; Russ Parrish
- Born: Russell John Parrish; November 24, 1970 (age 55); Redwood City, California, U.S.
- Origin: Los Angeles, California, U.S.
- Genres: Glam metal; hard rock
- Occupation: Guitarist
- Years active: 1992–present
- Member of: Steel Panther
- Formerly of: Fight

Russell John Parrish (born November 24, 1970), better known as Satchel, is an American musician. He is the lead guitarist for the comedic glam metal band Steel Panther.

== Early life ==
Russell John Parrish was born in Redwood City, California. He graduated from the Guitar Institute of Technology at the Musicians Institute in Hollywood in 1989.

== Career ==
After graduating, Parrish became an instructor through the early 1990s while playing with Racer X offshoot Bad Dog with vocalist Jeff Martin and The Electric Fence with Martin on drums and Paul Gilbert alternating guitar and bass. When Paul Gilbert joined Mr. Big, Parrish rented a room in Gilbert's Los Angeles home and house-sat for him when Gilbert would go on tour, simultaneously recording demos in Gilbert's home studio. He has worked extensively with Gilbert and has writing credits on several Paul Gilbert tracks. Parrish is seen playing bass (alongside Jeff Martin on drums) in the tuning section of Gilbert's "Terrifying Guitar Trip" video.

He played guitar for Jeff Pilson's band, War & Peace, appearing on the Time Capsule album, a collection of demos released on Shrapnel Records. After the breakup of War & Peace, Parrish was playing in a Thin Lizzy cover band when Jeff Martin introduced him to Judas Priest singer Rob Halford, resulting in Parrish joining Halford's band Fight and recording the War of Words album.

Upon exiting Fight he joined Cleveland's Outta The Blue, a local glam metal band that closed their show with Racer X covers, and who later became The Szuters. In 1995, Parrish played guitar in Kevin Gilbert's touring band in support of Gilbert's Thud album. He can be seen performing with Gilbert on Welcome to Joytown – Thud Live at the Troubadour, a DVD and CD released in 2009, documenting the band's 1995 concert at The Troubador in Los Angeles. In 1996, Parrish played guitar with Sebastian Bach on the song "Rock Bottom" for an Ace Frehley tribute album, Spacewalk (A Salute to Ace Frehley). From 2002 to 2006, he also played guitar in a Van Halen tribute band with future Steel Panther bandmate Ralph Saenz (aka Michael Starr) called The Atomic Punks. Around the same time, he was in a Rush cover band called Moving Pictures with Atomic Punks drummer Scott Patterson. In the early 2000s, he was the leader of his own band, The Thornbirds, with Darren Leader (future Steel Panther drummer Stix Zadinia), Jeff Duncan, and occasional Steel Panther songwriter Dean Cameron.

In 2000, Parrish was simultaneously playing in various bands and acting in the production "Rockalypse Now", a play written by Dean Cameron. Around this time, he and Ralph Saenz started glam metal cover band Metal Shop as the characters Rikki Ratchet and Michael Diamond, respectively, and appeared in a Discover card commercial as "Danger Kitty", a fictional one-hit-wonder band that spends all their royalty money on opulence and goes bankrupt. In 2003, Metal Shop (now renamed to Metal Skool) released their debut album, Hole Patrol, and began incorporating original songs into their live sets. The "classic" Steel Panther lineup was also cemented by this point, with Lexxi Foxx (real name Travis Haley) on bass and Stix Zadinia (real name Darren Leader) on drums, and with the Rikki Ratchet and Michael Diamond aliases being replaced with Satchel and Michael Starr, respectively. Six years later, the band renamed to Steel Panther and released their first album under the name, entitled Feel the Steel. They have become successful worldwide, with numerous celebrity fans and selling out arenas and festivals, including Download Festival in the UK.

Parrish also appeared with Corey Taylor in the Ronnie James Dio tribute album titled This Is Your Life on the track "Rainbow in the Dark".

== Equipment ==
In his early days, Parrish used a white Ibanez RG770 with sharktooth inlays as his primary guitar. During the Fight era, he primarily played a Heartfield/Fender Talon and was endorsed by Fender. His amps at that time were Ampegs VL 1002, designed by tube amp guru Lee Jackson, they are clearly visible in Fight's live footage, too. Parrish endorsed Kramer Guitars during early Steel Panther, utilizing the Pacer model into EVH 5150 III 100 watt amplifiers through EVH Cabs. He ran his Kramer Pacer to his amp through a Line 6 G90 Wireless Relay system.

In 2014 Kramer released a signature model featuring both a yellow leopard paint and purple leopard paint. It has the same body as a Pacer vintage but has one volume knob, a Seymour Duncan SH-4 and SH-2. In 2017, he was endorsed by Charvel.

In July 2018, the "Pussy Melter", a delay toneprint (preset) which had been manufactured by TC Electronic in an endorsement deal with Satchel, was removed from sale and discontinued following criticism of its alleged sexist marketing strategy. It was subsequently renamed "The Butthole Burner".

== Influences ==
Parrish has cited Tony Iommi, Ritchie Blackmore, Buck Dharma, Eddie Van Halen, Alex Lifeson, and Yngwie Malmsteen as his main guitar influences.

== Discography ==
Year	Album	Band	Credited as
1993	Time Capsule	War & Peace	Russ Parrish
1993	War of Words	Fight	Russ Parrish
1994	Smoke On The Water: A Tribute To Deep Purple	Various	Russ Parrish
1996	Spacewalk: A Salute to Ace Frehley	Various	Russ Parrish
2003	Hey That's What I Call Sludge Vol. 1	Various	Russ Parrish
2003	Hole Patrol	Metal Skool	Rikki Ratchet
2004	All the Same	The Thornbirds	Russ Parrish
2009	Feel the Steel	Steel Panther	Satchel
2011	Balls Out	Steel Panther	Satchel
2014	All You Can Eat	Steel Panther	Satchel
2017	Lower The Bar	Steel Panther	Satchel
2017	Under the Covers, Vol. II	Ninja Sex Party	Satchel
2019	Heavy Metal Rules	Steel Panther	Satchel
2023	On The Prowl	Steel Panther	Satchel
