= Balls Out (album) =

Studio album by Steel Panther
- Released: October 28, 2011
- Recorded: August 2010–May 2011
- Genre: Glam metal, heavy metal, comedy rock
- Length: 47:37; 54:55 (with bonus tracks)
- Label: Universal Republic
- Producer: Jay Ruston

Steel Panther chronology
Feel the Steel (2009)	Balls Out (2011)	All You Can Eat (2014)

Singles from Balls Out
- 1. "17 Girls In A Row" Released: 2011; 2. "If You Really Really Love Me" Released: 2011

Balls Out is the second studio album by the American glam metal band Steel Panther. It was released on October 28, 2011, on Universal Republic Records.

== Production and release ==
In an interview in May 2011, guitarist Satchel said that the band had begun recording new material in August 2010, and by May 2011 had completed all fifteen songs planned for the album.

The album was officially announced on July 19, 2011 and the title was announced on August 22. The album is produced by Jay Ruston, who previously worked with the band on their album Feel the Steel.

On September 6, it was announced that the album's release date had been pushed back from October 18 to 31, though it was released in Europe on iTunes on October 28.

The first singles of the album are "If You Really, Really Love Me" in the United Kingdom and "17 Girls In A Row" in the United States.

Guest appearances on the album are made by Dane Cook on "In the Future" and by Chad Kroeger and Nuno Bettencourt on "It Won't Suck Itself".

The album is indexed (Liste A, only allowed to be sold to adults after request) in Germany by the Bundesprüfstelle für jugendgefährdende Medien (BPjM) since September 2012.

== Reception ==
Professional ratings
Aggregate scores
Source	Rating
Metacritic	68/100
Review scores
Source	Rating
Allmusic	3.0/5 stars
Brave Words & Bloody Knuckles	9/10 stars
Kerrang	3/5 stars
Revolver	(4/5)
Rock Sound	3/5 stars
Rockstar Weekly	5/5 stars

=== Commercial ===
The album debuted at #41 in Canada, and debuted at #40 on the Billboard 200 chart with first-week sales of 12,000 copies in the United States.

=== Critical ===
Balls Out has received generally positive reviews from critics. Metacritic has given the album a score of 68, based on four reviews. Allmusic gave Balls Out a rating of three out of five stars, and said that "[a]s a hair metal album, Balls Out is finely crafted and well produced, evoking the glossy sound of the era, but as a joke, it’s pretty one-note, so either you’re going to get it or it's going to grate on you."Brave Words & Bloody Knuckles gave the album a rating of nine out of ten stars, saying that "[f]rom start to finish, Balls Out is 14 bundles of fun." Canadian music and entertainment website Rockstar Weekly gave the album a perfect 5 stars saying "For those lucky enough to understand the joke, Balls Out is the standout album of the year. It just plain kicks ass."

== Track listing ==
The track listing of Balls Out was announced on August 26, 2011.

No.	Title	Length
1.	"In the Future" (featuring Dane Cook)	1:28
2.	"Supersonic Sex Machine"	3:10
3.	"Just Like Tiger Woods"	3:41
4.	"17 Girls in a Row"	3:41
5.	"If You Really Really Love Me"	2:25
6.	"It Won't Suck Itself" (featuring Chad Kroeger and Nuno Bettencourt)	2:54
7.	"Tomorrow Night"	2:58
8.	"Why Can't You Trust Me"	4:01
9.	"That's What Girls Are For"	3:39
10.	"Gold Digging Whore"	3:55
11.	"I Like Drugs"	4:20
12.	"Critter"	3:38
13.	"Let Me Cum In"	3:30
14.	"Weenie Ride"	4:21
Total length:		47:38

Japanese bonus tracks
No.	Title	Length
15.	"Do You Wanna Do Me"	3:18
16.	"Handicapped Slut"	4:01
Total length:		54:56

== Personnel ==
- Michael Starr – lead vocals, backing vocals
- Satchel – guitars, backing vocals, acoustic guitar
- Lexxi Foxxx – bass, backing vocals
- Stix Zadinia – drums, backing vocals, piano on "Weenie Ride"
- Jay Ruston & Steel Panther – production
- Michael Lord – orchestration on "Weenie Ride"
- Jay Ruston – engineering & mixing
- Nick Rucker – additional overdub engineering
- Ara Sarkasian – assistant engineer
- F. Scott Schafer – photography

=== Guests ===
- Chad Kroeger (Nickelback) – co-lead vocals on "It Won't Suck Itself"
- Nuno Bettencourt (Extreme) – guitar solo on "It Won't Suck Itself"
- Heidi Murphy – female vocals on "It Won't Suck Itself"
- Dane Cook – narration on "In the Future"
- Joe Lester, Matt Nelson, Brett Anderson, Eden Blackman & Jay Ruston – background gang vocals

Recorded at Clear Lake Audio, Burbank, California. Overdubs mixed at TRS West, Sherman Oaks, California.

== Charts ==
Chart (2011)	Peak position
Australian Albums (ARIA)	50
Canadian Albums (Billboard)	41
Japanese Albums (Oricon)	85
Scottish Albums (OCC)	37
Swiss Albums (Schweizer Hitparade)	87
UK Albums (OCC)	37
UK Rock & Metal Albums (OCC)	3
US Billboard 200	40
US Top Hard Rock Albums (Billboard)	5
US Top Rock Albums (Billboard)	12
