= War of Words (Fight album) =

Studio album by Fight
- Released: September 9, 1993
- Studios: Wisseloord, Hilversum
- Genres: Heavy metal; thrash metal; groove metal
- Length: 59:18
- Label: Epic
- Producers: Attie Bauw and Rob Halford

Fight chronology
War of Words (1993)	A Small Deadly Space (1995)

Alternative cover
- 2008 Remixed and Remastered edition cover

Singles from War of Words
- 1. "Little Crazy" Released: 1993; 2. "Nailed to the Gun" Released: April 22, 1993; 3. "Immortal Sin" Released: 1994

Rob Halford chronology
Painkiller (1990)	War of Words (1993)	A Small Deadly Space (1995)

War of Words is the debut album by the American heavy metal band Fight, released on September 9, 1993, by Epic Records. This is the first release Rob Halford recorded after his departure from Judas Priest in 1992. He brought with him drummer Scott Travis from the band and recruited three new members. The music is a mixture between the heavy metal sound created by Judas Priest and a groove/thrash metal sound similar to that of Pantera. Halford is also credited with playing guitar but only recorded vocals for the album. Music videos were made for "Nailed to the Gun", "Immortal Sin" and "Little Crazy".

== Reception ==
Professional ratings
Review scores
Source	Rating
AllMusic	4/5 stars
Collector's Guide to Heavy Metal	6/10
Rock Hard	9/10

The Philadelphia Inquirer called War of Words "a solid album of thrashing mosh-pit rock".

In 2005, War of Words was ranked number 386 in Rock Hard magazine's book The 500 Greatest Rock & Metal Albums of All Time.

== Track listing ==
All tracks are written by Rob Halford.

No.	Title	Length
1.	"Into the Pit"	4:13
2.	"Nailed to the Gun"	3:38
3.	"Life in Black"	4:34
4.	"Immortal Sin"	4:39
5.	"War of Words"	4:29
6.	"Laid to Rest"	4:40
7.	"For All Eternity"	4:42
8.	"Little Crazy"	3:49
9.	"Contortion"	4:35
10.	"Kill It"	3:30
11.	"Vicious"	3:11
12.	"Reality, a New Beginning: I. "(no audio)" – 5:00; II. "Jesus Saves" (Hidden Track) – 3:38"	13:18

Japanese edition bonus track
No.	Title	Length
1.	"Kill It (Dutch Death Mix)"	3:36

== Note ==
"Reality, a New Beginning" is a 4:40 song. A 5-minute silence occurs before a hidden track titled "Jesus Saves" is played only on the CD release not on the cassette version. The remixed and remastered edition includes the song as a bonus track

== Personnel ==
Fight

- Rob Halford – vocals, guitar (credited)
- Brian Tilse – guitars, keyboards, backing vocals
- Russ Parrish – guitars, keyboards, backing vocals
- Jay Jay – bass, backing vocals
- Scott Travis – drums, percussion, backing vocals

Production

- Produced by Attie Bauw and Rob Halford
- Executive producer – John Baxter
- Recorded by Attie Bauw

2008 Remixed and Remastered Edition

- Remixed by Roy Z
- Remastered by Andy Horn
- Art design – Marc Sasso

== Charts ==
Chart (1993)	Peak position
German Albums (Offizielle Top 100)	56
Swedish Albums (Sverigetopplistan)	49
US Billboard 200	83
