= List of Mighty Magiswords episodes =

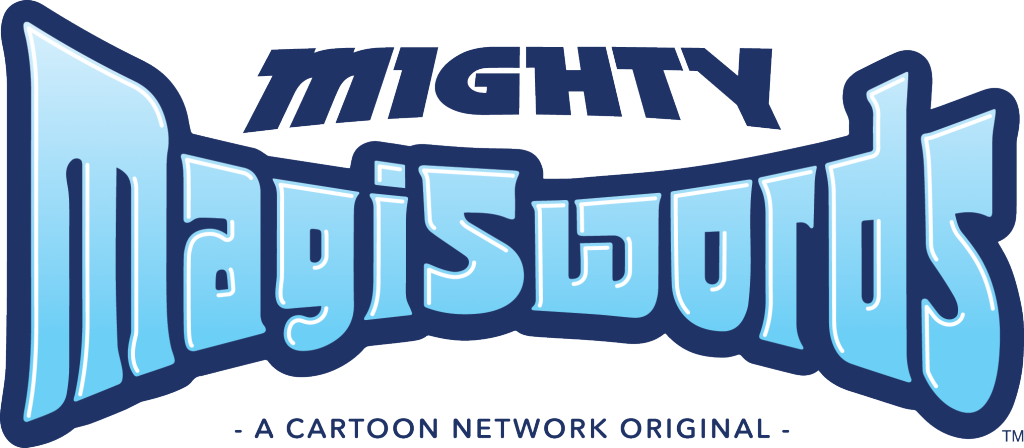

The following is a list of episodes from the series Mighty Magiswords created by Kyle Carrozza. On February 9, 2017, Mighty Magiswords was renewed for a second season as well as a new mobile game, Surely You Quest (in tie with its previous mobile game, MagiMobile).

From September 29, 2016 to May 17, 2019, 92 episodes of the series aired.

== Series overview ==
Season	Episodes	Originally released	
Season	Episodes	First released	Last released
Pilot		August 15, 2016	
1	52	September 29, 2016	April 29, 2018
2	40	April 30, 2018	May 17, 2019

== Episodes ==
=== Season 1 (2015) ===
No.	Title	Original air date	Production code
1	"To Boulderly Go"	May 6, 2015	201
Vambre and Prohyas' quest for the boulder treasure leads them to Prug the Dragon. Debut Magiswords: Pencil Magisword, Celery Magisword, Dolphin Magisword, Chainsaw Magisword, Radiator Magisword, Tomato Magisword, Mummy Magisword and Boulder Magisword
2	"Pig Iron"	May 6, 2015	202
Vambre and Prohyas compete for the Oinkus Magisword against Super Mighty Robot Piggeh. Debut Magiswords: Rad Rocket Magisword, Magnet Magisword, Exploding Bubble Magisword, Excaliburger Magisword and Oinkus Oinkus Magisword
3	"Dolphinominal"	July 1, 2015	204
Phil the thief swipes Prohyas' beloved Dolphin Magisword. Debut Magiswords: Accordion Magisword and Attractive Voice Magisword
4	"Bark Attack"	July 1, 2015	203
A Mysterious Hooded Woman hires Prohyas & Vambre to retrieve the Golden Spectacles from the Tree-J in the Deepest Darkest Woods. Debut Magiswords: Blow Dryer Magisword and Lobster Claw Magisword
5	"Hands Down"	August 3, 2015	206
The Warriors finally get some business doing yard work for Old Man Oldman. Debut Magiswords: Snowball Magisword, Sleeping Dragon Magisword and Nail Clipper Magisword
6	"The Land Before Slime"	August 3, 2015	205
Vambre and Prohyas head to the Dinosaur Kingdom to recover a lost baby dinosaur. Debut Magiswords: Hoversword Magiswords
7	"Zombie Reasonable"	September 1, 2015	207
On their quest to find the Zombie Pumpkin Magisword, the Warriors encounter Hoppus, and fight over who saw it first. Debut Magiswords: Zombie Pumpkin Magisword and Carrot Magisword
8	"Attacktus"	September 1, 2015	208
The Warriors are sent to the Barren Faceland to water a cactus, which grows into a giant cactus beast that attacks them. Debut Magiswords: Cheese Magisword and Cactus Magisword
9	"No Robots for Old Men"	October 1, 2015	209
Old Man Oldman is back with his secret weapon – Grup taped to the Robopiggeh. Debut Magisword: Ground Pound Magisword
10	"Whose Hyas Is It Anyway?"	October 1, 2015	210
The Warriors travel to futuristic Galacton and must figure out a way to get the Confusing Alien Magisword from Nohyas. Debut Magisword: Confusing Alien Magisword

=== Season 2 (2016–17) ===
No.	Title	Original air date	Production code
1	"Warriors for Hire"	August 15, 2016	301
Prohyas and Vambre's Warrior service is open for business. Vlogs: "Prohyas Talks About Magiswords: Mummy Magisword" and "Vambre Vlogs About Magiswords As Well: Retractable Ladder Magisword" Debut Magiswords: Retractable Ladder Magisword, Electric Eel Magisword and Plunger Magisword
2	"The Desolation of Grup"	August 22, 2016	302
The Warriors are hired to "vanquish" a dragon. Vlogs: "Prohyas Talks About Magiswords: Rad Rocket Magisword" Debut Magiswords: Electric Razor Magisword and Microphone Magisword
3	"Pool Fools"	August 29, 2016	303
Tired of their local public swimming pool, the Warriors travel to the Dinosaur Kingdom. Vlogs: "Prohyas Talks About Magiswords: Exploding Bubble Magisword" Guest Voice: Mr. Lawrence as Ralphio Debut Magiswords: Little Blue Bomb Magisword, Laser Pointer Magisword and Claw Magisword
4	"Too Many Warriors"	September 5, 2016	305
The Warriors and their archrivals: "Witch Way" are both hired to battle. Vlogs: "Prohyas Talks About Magiswords: Excaliburger Magisword" Guest Voices: Candi Milo as Morbidia, Arin Hanson as Gateaux and Luke Ski as Docky Boardman
5	"Walkies!"	September 12, 2016	311
Vambre and Prohyas are hired by Old Man Oldman to walk his new stray dog. Vlogs: "Prohyas Talks About Magiswords: Tomato Magisword" Debut Magiswords: Bling Bling Magisword, Boomerang Magisword, Dummystein Magisword, Slingshot Magisword, Hook Magisword, Giant Egg Magisword and Pogo Stick Magisword
6	"Identity Theft"	September 19, 2016	308
The Warriors must foil Prohyas' evil doppelganger "Nohyas." Vlogs: "Prohyas Talks About Magiswords: Celery Magisword" Guest Voices: Lindsay Smith-Carrozza as Witchy Simone, Phil LaMarr as Noville and Mr. Lawrence as Ralphio Debut Magiswords: Dairy Product Magisword and Microwave Magisword
7	"Stairways & Spiders"	October 11, 2016	307
The Warriors find themselves on a long and treacherous staircase guarded by a huge talking spider. Guest Voice: Pete Holmes as Teri the Spider Debut Magiswords: Bunch of Little Holes Magisword, Mop Magisword and Spider Web Magisword
8	"Vambre's Brain"	October 24, 2016	310
Vambre can't get her brain to go to sleep and it takes control of her body. Guest Voice: Candi Milo as Vambre's Brain Debut Magiswords: Flashlight Magisword and Cuppa Joe Magisword
9	"Do We Decimal System?"	November 7, 2016	312
The Warriors seek a secret book in the Library of Shhh! and their best friend from warrior school "Witchy Simone" follows them. Guest Voice: Lindsay Smith-Carrozza as Witchy Simone
10	"Can I Keep It?"	November 11, 2016 (MagiMobile); November 21, 2016 (CN Video)	313
Prohyas smuggles a Slime monster into Warriors' headquarters and things get hairy when the little guy starts to multiply. Debut Magiswords: Fireworks Magisword and Missing Sock Magisword
11	"The Saddest Little Bunny"	November 11, 2016 (MagiMobile); December 5, 2016 (CN Video)	315
The Warriors encounter a stoic warrior bunny whom they misinterpret as "sad" and try to cheer him up. Guest Voice: Hal Lublin as Omnibus Debut Magiswords: Sharkblade Magisword, Instant Wrap Magisword, Wickersnapper Magisword and Onion Magisword
12	"Bookish"	November 11, 2016 (MagiMobile); December 19, 2016 (CN Video)	316
Prohyas acts as matchmaker to a bookstore clerk who has a crush on Vambre. Guest Voice: Phil LaMarr as Noville Debut Magiswords: Hypno Magisword and Swish Navy Magisword
13	"Working Grup"	November 11, 2016 (MagiMobile); February 11, 2017 (CN Africa YouTube channel); February 13, 2017 (CN Video)	319
Vambre and Prohyas visit Grup's job to test some traps. They find the Frog Missile Magisword and they try to contain themselves to not steal it. Guest Voices: Luke Ski as Skullivan and Lindsay Smith-Carrozza as Lady Hiss Debut Magisword: Frog Missile Magisword
14	"Phil’s in the House"	November 11, 2016 (MagiMobile); February 13, 2017 (CN Video)	317
To exact his revenge on the Warriors, Phil the Pilferer hides in The Warriors' house and turns the siblings against each other. Guest Voices: Jim Cummings as Buford and Maurice LaMarche as Prohyas' Belch, Con and Man 4 Debut Magiswords: Wad of Gum Magisword and Footprint Magisword
15	"Keeper of the Mask"	November 11, 2016 (MagiMobile); February 17, 2017 (CN UK YouTube channel); May 26, 2017 (CN Video)	304
Vambre and Prohyas are on a quest to attain the Masked Magisword… but the Keeper of the Mask (voiced by Jim Cummings) sets a challenge before they can claim their prize: a mask with the facial expression of "mindless bliss" must be produced or the sword stays in the temple! Guest Voice: Jim Cummings as Keeper of the Mask Debut Magisword: Mask Magisword
16	"Do You Know the Muffin King?"	November 11, 2016 (MagiMobile); March 5, 2017 (CN UK YouTube channel); May 26, 2017 (CN Video)	305
The Warriors are treated to a banquet by the grateful Kotassians and Vambre accidentally eats their king. Guest Voice: "Weird Al" Yankovic as Papa Kotassium Debut Magiswords: Monobrow Magisword, Clapping Magisword and Flour Power Magisword
17	"The Curse of Dummystein"	November 11, 2016 (MagiMobile); March 9, 2017 (CN UK YouTube channel); May 26, 2017 (CN Video)	306
Vambre gives Prohyas the silent treatment, only to have her voice stolen away by a ventriloquist dummy Frankenstein.
18	"Play That Song Again"	November 11, 2016 (MagiMobile); March 30, 2017 (CN UK YouTube channel); May 26, 2017 (CN Video)	314
Vambre gets on Prohyas for playing the same song too much, and he exacts revenge. Guest Voices: Candi Milo as Vambre's Brain and Phil LaMarr as Long James Debut Magiswords: Golden Curls Magisword and Muscly Arm Magisword
19	"Flonk Stakes"	November 11, 2016 (MagiMobile); May 26, 2017 (CN Video)	318
At Ralphio's House of Swords, the Warriors square off against an old school mate who is breaking all their beloved magiswords. Guest Voice: Paul Schrier as Flonk
20	"Flashback Farms"	November 11, 2016 (MagiMobile); May 26, 2017 (CN Video)	320
Trying to cheer Vambre up, Prohyas recalls when they were kids on their parents' Broccoli Farm. Guest Voices: Renee Albert as Kablammica Warrior, Dana Gould as Norman Warrior and Luke Ski as Docky Boardman

=== Season 3 (2017): Adventure Academy ===
No.	Title	Original air date	Production code
1	"Adventure Academy: Adventure Academy 101"	June 30, 2017	211
A student introduction gets interrupted by a Monster Attack Dummy that comes to life and the Warriors take it upon themselves to defeat it with Magiswords. Guest Voices: Rob Paulsen as Professor Cyrus, Mary Faber as Morbidia, Arin Hanson as Gateaux and Phibby Croax, Townsend Coleman as Neddy the Mallet, Luke Ski as Cattus the One Blade, Lindsay Smith-Carrozza as Witchy Simone, Rider Strong as Familiar and Kate Micucci as Bimm Debut Magiswords: Unravel Magisword and Shuffle Magisword
2	"Adventure Academy: Dino Ducking"	June 30, 2017	212
Prohyas and Morbidia are chosen to dodge a gauntlet of charging mechanical dinosaurs in today's lesson from Professor C, but Prohyas panics and defeats the mechanized beasts with Magiswords instead. Guest Voices: Rob Paulsen as Professor Cyrus and Mary Faber as Morbidia Debut Magiswords: Fossil Magisword and Bite Beast Magisword
3	"Adventure Academy: Sluggernaut"	June 30, 2017	213
Professor Cyrus wears a giant slug costume as Vambre and Neddy battle him on the round woody stage, but Vambre avoids a gooey brawl using Magiswords to make her the slug slayer. Guest Voices: Rob Paulsen as Professor Cyrus, Townsend Coleman as Neddy the Mallet, Rider Strong as Familiar, Kate Micucci as Bimm, Lindsay Smith-Carrozza as Witchy Simone and Mary Faber as Morbidia Debut Magiswords: Sea Salt Magisword and Cayenne Pepper Magisword
4	"Adventure Academy: Weather or Naut"	June 30, 2017	214
In a lesson on how to control a Weather Gnome, Witchy Simone casts a spell that causes a blizzard and Prohyas must tame the weather with Magiswords. Guest Voices: Rob Paulsen as Professor Cyrus and Lindsay Smith Carrozza as Witchy Simone Debut Magiswords: Springtime Magisword and Toboggan Magisword
5	"Adventure Academy: Ham of Glory"	June 30, 2017	215
Phibby Croax wants to fight in the extreme and has no patience to learn the ham-fisted fighting style in the day's lesson called the Ham Of Glory, so Prohyas breaks out Magiswords to teach Phibby not to be a meathead. Guest Voices: Rob Paulsen as Professor Cyrus and Arin Hanson as Phibby Croax Debut Magiswords: Rump Roast Magisword and Pillow Magisword
6	"Adventure Academy: Dragonators"	June 30, 2017 (MagiMobile)	216
Guest Voices: Rob Paulsen as Professor Cyrus, Mary Faber as Morbidia and Arin Hanson as Gateaux Debut Magiswords: Catnip Mouse Magisword and Slime Magisword
7	"Adventure Academy: Fickle Fishing"	June 30, 2017 (MagiMobile)	217
Guest Voices: Rob Paulsen as Professor Cyrus and Kate Micucci as Bimm Debut Magiswords: Fishstick Magisword and Glamour Gown Magisword
8	"Adventure Academy: Barren Quicksand"	June 30, 2017 (MagiMobile)	218
Guest Voices: Rob Paulsen as Professor Cyrus and Rider Strong as Familiar Debut Magiswords: Butterfly Magisword and Cement Truck Magisword
9	"Adventure Academy: Royal Tower Rescue"	June 30, 2017 (MagiMobile)	219
Guest Voices: Rob Paulsen as Professor Cyrus and Luke Ski as Cattus the One Blade Debut Magiswords: Acorn Arsenal Magisword and Chillax Mist Magisword
10	"Adventure Academy: Whack a Shark"	June 30, 2017 (MagiMobile)	220
Guest Voices: Rob Paulsen as Professor Cyrus and Arin Hanson as Gateaux and Phibby Croax Debut Magiswords: Extended Flick Magisword and Fish Head Magisword
11	"Adventure Academy: Trollblin Thumb Wrestling"	June 30, 2017 (MagiMobile)	221
Guest Voices: Rob Paulsen as Professor Cyrus, Arin Hanson as Phibby Croax and Kate Micucci as Bimm Debut Magiswords: Opposable Thumb Magisword and Mechanical Mole Magisword
12	"Adventure Academy: Enchanted Tree Chopping"	June 30, 2017 (MagiMobile)	222
Guest Voices: Rob Paulsen as Professor Cyrus and Enchanted Tree and Lindsay Smith-Carrozza as Witchy Simone Debut Magiswords: Pencil Sharpener Magisword and Veg-A-Splode Magisword
13	"Adventure Academy: Barking Broccoli Spider Barkdown"	June 30, 2017 (MagiMobile)	223
Guest Voices: Rob Paulsen as Professor Cyrus, Townsend Coleman as Neddy the Mallet, Lindsay Smith-Carrozza as Witchy Simone and Kate Micucci as Bimm Debut Magiswords: Smelly Shoe Magisword and Permanent Vacation Magisword
14	"Adventure Academy: Passe Pirate"	June 30, 2017 (MagiMobile)	224
Guest Voices: Rob Paulsen as Professor Cyrus and Rider Strong as Familiar and Pirates Debut Magiswords: Baby Booty Magisword and Normcore Magisword
15	"Adventure Academy: Meatier Milking"	June 30, 2017 (MagiMobile)	225
Guest Voices: Rob Paulsen as Professor Cyrus and Luke Ski as Cattus the One Blade Debut Magiswords: Bubble Pop Magisword and Soothing Brush Magisword
16	"Adventure Academy: Snow Decoy"	June 30, 2017 (MagiMobile)	226
Ghastly terrors of Transylbiria can be evaded by making snow decoys, but when Morbidia uses magic, her Abominable Snow Decoy must be destroyed by Vambre's Magiswords. Guest Voices: Rob Paulsen as Professor Cyrus and Singing Snowman, Mary Faber as Morbidia and Arin Hanson as Gateaux and Phibby Croax Debut Magiswords: Droopy Clothes Magisword and Warm Hug Magisword
17	"Adventure Academy: Sheepy Jungle Shearing"	June 30, 2017 (MagiMobile)	227
Prohyas and Bimm need more than just electric clippers to sheer the constantly growing Sheepy Jungle fluff, they need Magiswords! Guest Voices: Rob Paulsen as Professor Cyrus and Kate Micucci as Bimm Debut Magisword: Stuffed Animal Magisword and Looming Loom Magisword
18	"Adventure Academy: Delirious Dancing"	June 30, 2017 (MagiMobile)	228
Professor Cyrus shares that "sick dance moves" can disorient opponents in the Barren Faceland, but when faced with angry frilled running lizards in class Vambre finds that Magiswords help her dance moves. Guest Voices: Rob Paulsen as Professor Cyrus and Townsend Coleman as Neddy the Mallet Debut Magiswords: Body Poppin' Magisword and Dancing Bear Magisword
19	"Adventure Academy: The Thousand Eye Stare"	June 30, 2017 (MagiMobile)	229
A staring contest with Blinky the Flower Boy seems simple enough, too simple, yet when Gateaux makes a spell to make the opponent more formidable, Vambre's Magiswords are needed. Guest Voices: Rob Paulsen as Professor Cyrus and Arin Hanson as Gateaux Debut Magiswords: Ointment Magisword and Rainbow Glasses Magisword
20	"Adventure Academy: Oasis of Fear"	June 30, 2017 (MagiMobile)	230
In the final lesson of the semester, Prohyas and Phibby Croax attempt to make their own Oasis of Fear, but Prohyas has other Magisword-related ideas in mind. In the end, as Vambre and Prohyas mope about all the Magiswords they've lost during the school year, Bunky delivers them a small piece of a map that would lead them to where all of their Magiswords are stored. Guest Voices: Rob Paulsen as Professor Cyrus and Arin Hanson as Gateaux and Phibby Croax Debut Magiswords: Glo-Stick Magisword and Fightwig Magisword

== Segments list ==
Cartoon Network ordered and finished 15 Mighty Magiswords micro-shorts for the CN Anything app. The object of the app involves a situation involving the Warriors for Hire and it's up for the players to "Choose Your Magisword" to help the Warriors succeed on their goal. The segments air in out of order and several clips of them can be found in some Mighty Magiswords promos. Creator Kyle Carrozza released the entire collection on his secondary YouTube channel on June 26, 2023.

No.	Title	Production code
1	"Prohyas and Hoppus vs. Veggie"	101/102
Prohyas helps Hoppus pull a veggie. Magiswords used: Pencil Magisword, Dolphin Magisword
2	"Prohyas vs. Hoppus"	129/130
Hoppus challenges Prohyas for the Celery Magisword Magiswords used: Celery Magisword, Tomato Magisword
3	"Vambre vs. Phil #1"	119/120
Phil becomes Prohyas' hat for money but Vambre states that's not how hats work. Magiswords used: Cheese Magisword, Blow Dryer Magisword
4	"Vambre vs. Phil #2"	109/110
Vambre wants to buy a cloak but Phil stole her wallet. Magiswords used: Mummy Magisword, Magnet Magisword
5	"Prohyas vs. Tree-J"	125/126
Prohyas wants to get the Tree-J to pipe down Magiswords used: Zombie Pumpkin Magisword, Dolphin Magisword
6	"Prohyas vs. Quicksand"	117/118
Prohyas is stuck in quicksand. Magiswords used: Lobsterclaw Magisword, Magnet Magisword
7	"Warriors for Hire vs. the Heat"	107/108
Prohyas and Vambre are dying in the heat. Magiswords used: Chainsaw Magisword, Dolphin Magisword
8	"Prohyas vs. Nohyas"	111/112
Prohyas meets his doppelganger, Nohyas, who wants his Magiswords. Magiswords used: Cheese Magisword, Electric Razor Magisword
9	"Prohyas vs. the Dolphin Magisword"	113/114
Prohyas lets his Dolphin Magisword use any magisword she likes for being good all week. Magiswords used: Sleeping Dragon Magisword, Excaliburger Magisword
10	"Warriors for Hire vs. King Rexxtopher #1"	121/122
The Warriors for Hire try to get King Rexxtopher's Claw Magisword Magiswords used: Boulder Magisword, Accordion Magisword
11	"Warriors for Hire vs. King Rexxtopher #2"	103/104
The Warriors for Hire fight Rexxtopher when he demanded them to stop eating dinosaurs. Magiswords used: Pencil Magisword, Snowball Magisword
12	"Warriors for Hire vs. Snowmanpire"	105/106
The Warriors for Hire encounter a Snowmanpire in Transylberia. Magiswords used: Onion Magisword, Radiator Magisword
13	"Vambre vs. Transylberia"	123/124
Vambre is freezing in Transylberia due to her bare legs. Magiswords used: Radiator Magisword, Attractive Voice Magisword
14	"Vambre vs. UFO"	115/116
Vambre is being annoyed by a UFO in Galacton Magiswords used: Rad Rocket Magisword, Boulder Magisword
15	"Vambre vs. Hambus"	127/128
Vambre takes offense when Hambus oinks at her. Magiswords used: Blow Dryer Magisword, Oinkus Oinkus Magisword

== Television episodes ==
=== Pilot (2016) ===
Title	Written and storyboarded by	Original release date	Prod. code
"Warriors for Hire"	Kyle Carrozza	August 15, 2016	301
Note: The webisode can be considered as the main pilot of the series.

=== Season 1 (2016–18) ===
No. overall	No. in season	Title	Written and storyboarded by	Story by	Original release date	Prod. code	U.S. viewers (millions)
1	1	"The Mystery of Loch Mess"	Zoë Moss and Luke Ski	Mr. Lawrence and Kyle A. Carrozza	September 29, 2016	601	1.16
Prohyas and Vambre must save captured innocents from Queen Porcina. Guest voices: Judy Tenuta as Queen Porcina, Mary Faber as Morbidia, and Arin Hanson as Gateaux and Delivery Man Steve Debut Magiswords: Bacon Magisword and Birdcall Magisword
2	2	"Squirrelled Domination!"	John Berry and Drew Green	Mr. Lawrence and Kyle A. Carrozza	September 29, 2016	602	1.16
The Warriors are hired to gather some golden acorns, but Vambre remembers she has a fear of squirrels and tries to avoid it. Guest voices: Candi Milo as Dolphin Magisword and Vambre's Brain Debut Magisword: Gummy Sticky Hand Magisword
3	3	"Case Clothed"	Krystal Ureta and Clay Lindvall	Mr. Lawrence and Kyle A. Carrozza	October 6, 2016	603	1.08
Princess Zange hires the Warriors to be her secret service while she goes shopping. Guest voices: Hal Lublin as Pirate 01, 02, 08 and Shopkeeper Debut Magisword: Flyswatter Magisword
4	4	"Surely You Jesto"	Mike Kazaleh	Mr. Lawrence and Kyle A. Carrozza	October 13, 2016	604	0.95
The Warriors think that housesitting for Omnibus is boring work. Guest voice: Tom Kenny as The Taunting Jester Magisword Debut Magisword: Taunting Jester Magisword
5	5	"Cleanliness Is Next to Grupliness"	Zoë Moss and Luke Ski	Mr. Lawrence and Kyle A. Carrozza	October 20, 2016	605	1.13
The Warriors notice Grup has an obnoxious odor and tries to clean him, but Grup tries to avoid them, being afraid of water. Debut Magiswords: Raincloud Magisword and Diving Suit Magisword
6	6	"Mushroom Menace"	Krystal Ureta and Clay Lindvall	Mr. Lawrence and Kyle A. Carrozza	October 27, 2016	607	1.08
The Warriors for Hire and the Zombie Pumpkin Magisword must save The Mysterious Hooded Woman's home from the evil Smashroom. Guest Voice: Hal Lublin as The Great Omnibus, Smashroom and Ice Posey Note: Originally aired as a sneak peek before the series premiered on September 29, 2016. Debut Magiswords: Kite Magisword and Foam Finger Magisword
7	7	"Flirty Phantom"	Mike Kazaleh	Mr. Lawrence and Kyle A. Carrozza	October 27, 2016	608	1.03
Lost in Transylberia, the Warriors come to a haunted house for help and meet a young ghost lady inside that wants to spend the rest of her afterlife with Prohyas. Guest voice: Kate Micucci as Penny Plasm, and Ken Mitchroney as House and Sales Deer Debut Magiswords: One Big Hole Magisword and Jackhammer Magisword
8	8	"The Wrath of Neddy"	John Berry and Drew Green	Richard Pursel and Kyle A. Carrozza	November 3, 2016	606	1.01
The Cave Weirdos are displaced from their cave by Neddy the Mallet and turn to the Warriors to help them reclaim their place. Guest voice: Townsend Coleman as Neddy the Mallet Debut Magisword: Beehive Magisword
9	9	"Working for Scales"	Zoë Moss and Luke Ski	Mr. Lawrence and Kyle A. Carrozza	November 7, 2016	609	0.92
Princess Zange is sick and requires a dinosaur scale for a tea remedy, but King Rexxtopher is fiercely against the Warriors stepping foot inside his Dinosaur Kingdom to get it. Guest voice: Kyle Massey as Mr. Spoony, Ankylosaurus and Brachiosaurus Debut Magisword: Bag of Snakes Magisword
10	10	"Felonious Prose"	John Berry and Drew Green	Kyle A. Carrozza and Richard Pursel	November 8, 2016	610	0.81
The Warriors search for a contact lens is compromised by Vambre's obsession with a Veronica Victorious novel. Guest voice: Jim Cummings as Buford Debut Magisword: Underpants Magisword
11	11	"Potion in the Ocean"	Krystal Ureta and Clay Lindvall	Richard Pursel and Kyle A. Carrozza	November 9, 2016	611	0.99
Witchy Simone joins the Warriors on a mission deep in the Fickle Sea to find an eye of newt for her magic potion, but Man Fish the Fish Man won’t let them harm his sea newt pal. Guest voices: Bill Kopp as Man Fish the Fish Man and Eel, and Dana Gould as Norman Warrior and Pirate Fish Debut Magisword: Roundabout Magisword
12	12	"Bad Bad Cop"	Bob Camp	Kyle A. Carrozza and Mr. Lawrence	November 10, 2016	612	1.07
Vambre and Prohyas pretend to be cops in their attempts to shake down a dangerous bunch of pirates to find a broccoli smuggler. Debut Magiswords: Big Bad Boot Magisword and Squeaky Nightstick Magisword
13	13	"Gotta Get Grup to Get Down"	Zoë Moss and Luke Ski	Mr. Lawrence, Kyle A. Carrozza, and Luke Ski	November 11, 2016	613	1.24
Grup wants the warriors to help him become the biggest music star in Rhyboflaven, but it proves to be a difficult task. Debut Magisword: Telescope Magisword
14	14	"Thick as Thieves"	John Berry and Drew Green	Kyle A. Carrozza and Mr. Lawrence	November 14, 2016	614	0.87
Phil the Pilferer robs Vambre and Prohyas of their very best Magiswords so he can snag the Sheepy Mantis, but the Warriors find out that no Magisword is lame as they manage to keep Phil from becoming Thief of the Year. Debut Magiswords: Homing Device Magisword, Dirt Magisword and Sticky Note Magisword
15	15	"Biggest Fan"	Krystal Ureta and Clay Lindvall	Richard Pursel and Kyle A. Carrozza	November 15, 2016	615	0.95
The Warriors are followed around by their #1 fan and try to get rid of her. Guest voice: Erica Luttrell as Glori Debut Magiswords: Rubber Stamp Magisword, Walk the Plank Magisword, X-Ray Magisword and Perfume Magisword
16	16	"Dungeons and Dayjobs"	Dave Alvarez and Bob Camp	Richard Pursel and Kyle A. Carrozza	November 16, 2016	616	0.98
A botched mission leaves the Warriors in debt, so they take day jobs at Slugburger and sling Slugburgers for Witchy Simone. Guest voice: Jess Harnell as Bag Puppets Debut Magisword: Paper Bag Magisword
17	17	"Little Sword of Horrors"	Zoë Moss and Luke Ski	Kyle A. Carrozza, Mr. Lawrence, and Richard Pursel	November 17, 2016	617	1.10
Prohyas grows a new Magisword from a seed, not knowing that his Carnivorous Plant Magisword is a menace to society. Debut Magiswords: Mega-Drill Magisword, Excavator Magisword, Cuddle Puppy Magisword and Carnivorous Plant Magisword
18	18	"Champions of Breakfast"	John Berry and Drew Green	Kyle A. Carrozza and Richard Pursel	November 18, 2016	618	1.06
Prohyas and Vambre argue over which breakfast food is better by battling with their breakfast Magiswords. Guest voices: Jack McBrayer as Snax, and Jess Harnell as Füd Fït Debut Magiswords: Abacus Magisword, Pan Flute Magisword, Trouser Magisword, Waffle Magisword and Pancake Magisword
19	19	"Gut Feelings"	Krystal Ureta and Clay Lindvall	Kyle A. Carrozza, Richard Pursel, and Clay Lindvall	December 1, 2016	619	1.03
The Warriors try to help Hoppus find his missing vegetables. Guest voices: Renee Albert as Kablammica Warrior, and Gilbert Gottfried as Prohyas' Stomach Debut Magiswords: Stirring Spoon Magisword, Cardboard Replica Magisword, Bok Choy Magisword and Rutabaga Magisword
20	20	"The Tome of Morrow"	Gabe del Valle and Jessie Greenberg	Kyle A. Carrozza and Richard Pursel	January 27, 2017	621	0.95
The Warriors are sent on a quest to retrieve a magical book. Guest voice: Jeff Bennett as Sir Grimmsibald Femursworth
21	21	"Share and Share Dislike"	Zoë Moss and Luke Ski	Kyle A. Carrozza	February 3, 2017	622	1.01
When Prohyas and Vambre get the new Shooting Star Magisword, they can't seem to share it. Guest voice: Dave "Gruber" Allen as Frostferatu
22	22	"Grup Jam"	Dave Alvarez and Norma Klingler	Kyle A. Carrozza and Richard Pursel	February 17, 2017	620	0.75
Grup invents the “new” sport of basketball, but the stakes are too high for the Warriors to let him play the Galacton team, as the winner shall rule the Kingdom of Rhyboflaven. Guest voices: Eddie Pepitone as DeBizz, Dave Coulier as Murray Williams, and Phil LaMarr as The Tall Uninteresting One
23	23	"Bad Man Oldman"	Gabe del Valle and Mike Pelensky	Kyle A. Carrozza and Richard Pursel	July 1, 2017	625	0.75
After the Warriors ruin Old Man Oldman's house roof, he plans to get revenge on them.
24	24	"Witchy Simone Ruins Everything"	Zoë Moss and Luke Ski	Kyle A. Carrozza and Richard Pursel	July 2, 2017	626	0.54
Gateaux hires the Warriors to split up Witchy Simone and Morbidia.
25	25	"Strange Nedfellows"	John Berry and Drew Green	Kyle A. Carrozza and Richard Pursel	July 3, 2017	627	0.83
Omnibus hires the Warriors to retrieve a special salmon named Queen Salmon for his aquarium, and Neddy decides to tag along with the Warriors just to eat the salmon.
26	26	"Action Comedy"	Gabe del Valle and Mike Pelensky	Kyle A. Carrozza and Richard Pursel	July 4, 2017	629	0.61
Rhyboflaven's fictional superhero Broccoli Punch has a new, spectacular show, but when Flonk masquerades as the star, the Warriors disguise themselves as broccoli bad guys. Guest voices: Paul Schrier as Flonk Stakes, and Johnny Yong Bosch as Broccoli Punch
27	27	"Random Acts of Memory"	Zoë Moss and Luke Ski	Kyle A. Carrozza and Richard Pursel	July 5, 2017	630	0.81
The Warriors learn that Nohyas has been using a Selective Memory Magisword to erase select interactions with Prohyas's bizarre doppelganger. Note: This episode contains a short of "Adventure Academy". Note 2: This episode also contains bonus scenes for the shorts "To Boulderly Go" and "No Robots for Old Men". Guest voices: Rob Paulsen as Professor Cyrus, Arin Hanson as Phibby Croax and Luke Ski as Cattus the One Blade
28	28	"Elect to Decline"	John Berry and Drew Green	Kyle A. Carrozza and Richard Pursel	July 6, 2017	631	0.78
Noville wants to impress Vambre with a new Magisword from the Cave of Stuff, but the Cave Weirdos are in election mode and horrible smear campaigning makes Noville's simple task impossible.
29	29	"They See Me Trollblin"	Gabe del Valle and Mike Pelensky	Kyle A. Carrozza and Richard Pursel	July 7, 2017	633	0.81
The tiny Kotassians hire the Warriors to exterminate two humongous Trollblins that have invaded their village. Guest voices: "Weird Al" Yankovic as Papa Kotassium, Rosearik Rikki Simons as The Red Trollblin, and Mark Fite as The Green Trollblin
30	30	"Hideous Hound"	Zoë Moss and Luke Ski	Kyle A. Carrozza and Richard Pursel	July 8, 2017	634	0.65
Prohyas pets an unsightly stray dog, and, from that moment on, the poor pooch appears on a variety of Warrior missions, driving Vambre insane.
31	31	"Getting Ahead"	John Berry and Drew Green	Kyle A. Carrozza and Richard Pursel	July 9, 2017	635	0.67
When the headless body of Omnibus knocks at their door, the Warriors use Magiswords to try to make a head they can talk to.
32	32	"The Cave of Gelatinous; Doom!"	Victor Courtright, Clay Lindvall, and Krystal Ureta	Kyle A. Carrozza and Richard Pursel	July 10, 2017	636	0.73
The Warriors don't have a worthy adventure to use their impressive new skull-and-crossbones-emblazoned Bonehead Magisword until they are sent on a quest to battle a mighty slime beast in the Dungeon of Gelatinous Doom.
33	33	"Pachydermus Interruptus"	Gabe del Valle and Mike Pelensky	Kyle A. Carrozza and Richard Pursel	July 11, 2017	637	0.74
A battle with Man Fish the Fish Man leaves Warriors For Hire HQ in shambles, so landlord, Mr. Pachydermus, has the Warriors repair the damage, but without Magiswords.
34	34	"Squideo Games"	Andrew Scherman and Ang Vondra	Kyle A. Carrozza and Richard Pursel	July 12, 2017	638	0.68
When Vambre and Prohyas are hired for separate gigs, they end up having to battle each other to claim a rare Squideo from Lake Sprite in Galacton.
35	35	"Sibling Sorcery"	Drew Green and Zoë Moss	Kyle A. Carrozza and Richard Pursel	July 13, 2017	639	0.56
When Phil the Pilferer steals the Golden Broomstick Magisword Award intended for Witchy Simone's famous younger sister, Witchy Sparkles, the Warriors lead the search in getting it back. Guest Voices: Haley Mancini as Witchy Sparkles, and Robbie Rist as Frankie Jupiter
36	36	"Don't Read the Comments"	John Berry and Luke Ski	Kyle A. Carrozza and Richard Pursel	July 14, 2017	640	0.80
An obsession with comments and criticisms about him on the Board of Opinions drives Prohyas nuts, affecting Warrior missions for the worse and raising Vambre's ire.
37	37	"Hoppus the Hunted"	Clay Lindvall and Krystal Ureta	Kyle A. Carrozza and Richard Pursel	July 17, 2017	641	0.73
The bunny sorceress, Danelda, has been on the search for Hoppus so she can take him back to their rabbit village, but Hoppus is too enamored by Kablammica and her broccoli soup to ever go back. Guest Voice: Michaela Dietz as Danelda, and Dana Gould as Norman
38	38	"Transylbabies"	Gabe del Valle and Mike Pelensky	Kyle A. Carrozza and Richard Pursel	July 17, 2017	642	0.73
A mission to babysit Snowmanpire babies in Transylbiria leads Vambre and Prohyas to attack the local monster townsfolk in misguided attempts to keep the Snowbabies safe.
39	39	"Bureaucrophobia"	Drew Green and Zoë Moss	Kyle A. Carrozza and Richard Pursel	July 18, 2017	643	0.74
Teri Gargantuan is in trouble and her spider kids hire the Warriors to save their mom from a mad mercenary spider hunter. Guest Voices: Pete Holmes as Teri Gargantuan and Thaddeus Thirdwell III, Brian Posehn as Tracy and Logan Gargantuan, and Fred Stoller as Bobbipher Gargantuan and Robot Face 1.
40	40	"Continue?"	John Berry and Luke Ski	Kyle A. Carrozza and Richard Pursel	July 18, 2017	644	0.74
The Mysterious Hooded Woman hires the Warriors to retrieve the Orb of Sphericity from a temple in Galacton. The odd thing is, this temple has save points! When the Warriors are defeated, they respawn, but Vambre remembers what happened and Prohyas does not.
41	41	"Hunting for Scavengers"	Clay Lindvall and Krystal Ureta	Kyle A. Carrozza and Richard Pursel	July 19, 2017	645	0.71
An impish weather gnome sends the Warriors, Ned and Witch Way on a competitive quest for three weird items, making them wonder what they'll be used for. Guest Voice: Victor Courtright as Mr. Flummocks and Amoeba
42	42	"Get That BORFL!"	Gabe del Valle and Mike Pelensky	Kyle A. Carrozza and Richard Pursel	July 20, 2017	646	0.76
A restful chill day for the Warriors and Princess Zange in the Royal Spa gets upended when a cute little Borfl runs amok throughout Castle Rhyboflaven, with the Warriors resorting to Magiswords to thwart the critter. Guest Voice: Rosearik Rikki Simons as the Borfl, the MagiMobile voice and the Robo Tank, and Gabrielle Sanalitro as the Auto Style Magisword
43	43	"Unconventional; Dolphinism"	Drew Green and Zoë Moss	Kyle A. Carrozza and Richard Pursel	July 21, 2017	647	0.73
Since Prohyas is taking Dolphin Magisword to the Dolphin Convention, Vambre asks Witchy Simone to join her on a search for the Narwhal Magisword, angering a deadly Sealdebeast guard that lures dolphins away from the convention in the process. Guest Voice: Bonnie Gordon as Dolphin-Chan, Barnacle 1 and the Narwhal Magisword
44	44	"Letter Wronging; Campaign"	John Berry and Luke Ski	Kyle A. Carrozza and Richard Pursel	July 22, 2017	649	0.61
While Vambre takes a well-needed break, Prohyas and Noville try to solve a mystery involving letters disappearing from books! Can they get this done without calling Vambre and ruining her day off?
45	45	"The Saga of Robopiggeh!"	John Berry, Drew Green, Clay Lindvall, and Krystal Ureta	Kyle A. Carrozza and Richard Pursel	July 23, 2017	623	0.56
46	46	"The Saga of Robopiggeh!"	John Berry, Drew Green, Clay Lindvall, and Krystal Ureta	Kyle A. Carrozza and Richard Pursel	July 23, 2017	624	0.56
In the first half-hour special, a botched rescue attempt damages their robot pal, RoboPiggeh, and Vambre and Prohyas must battle the evil cyborg, Tara-Byte, in Galacton, who is determined to dismantle their broken pal for being obsolete. Guest voices: Maria Bamford as Tara-Byte, and Micky Dolenz as Wendell the Love Grub
47	47	"Bad Heir Day"	Clay Lindvall and Krystal Ureta	Kyle A. Carrozza, Richard Pursel, Clay Lindvall, and Krystal Ureta	April 15, 2018 (Note: This episode first aired on September 3, 2017 in the Philippines. In the US, it was first released on the Cartoon Network App on December 8, 2017.)	628	0.59
When Princess Zange's Autostyle Magisword is stolen, it's up to the Warriors to retrieve it so their royal leader can face her subject without having bad hair.
48	48	"Docky & Buford's; Decidedly Pathetic; Adventure"	Clay Lindvall and Krystal Ureta	Kyle A. Carrozza and Richard Pursel	April 15, 2018 (Note: This episode first aired on September 17, 2017 in South-East Asia. In the US, it was first released on the Cartoon Network App on December 8, 2017.)	632	0.59
Docky Boardman and Buford want to beef up business for the Rhyboflaven Boardwalk, but in their hunt for a new attraction, they get eaten by a mammoth-sized Ramblyboo and it's up to the Warriors to get them out.
49	49	"School's In, Oh Bummer!"	John Berry and Luke Ski	Kyle A. Carrozza, Richard Pursel, and Luke Ski	April 22, 2018 (Note: This episode was first released on the Cartoon Network App on December 8, 2017.)	648	0.51
It turns out that Vambre and Prohyas didn't graduate the Adventure Academy after all and need to go back to school to earn their diplomas.
50	50	"Taming of the Swords"	Gabe del Valle and Mike Pelensky	Kyle A. Carrozza and Richard Pursel	April 22, 2018	650	0.51
The Warriors attempt to tame two of their most problematic Magiswords, Taunting Jester and Carnivorous Plant, with the help of their expert Magiswordsmith mother, Kablammica.
51	51	"Quest for Knowledge!"	Drew Green, Zoë Moss, John Berry, and Luke Ski	Kyle A. Carrozza and Richard Pursel	April 29, 2018 (Note: This episode was first released on the Cartoon Network App on December 8, 2017. On TV, it first aired on December 17, 2017 in South-East Asia and Australia.)	651	0.47
52	52	"Quest for Knowledge!"	Drew Green, Zoë Moss, John Berry, and Luke Ski	Kyle A. Carrozza and Richard Pursel	April 29, 2018	652	0.47
After a flashback showcasing the origins of the Warriors' passion for Magiswords, they return to Adventure Academy where Professor Cyrus sets V and P and their former classmates on a quest to find the Legendary Knowledge Magisword, while some undesirable evil lurks beneath their noses. Note 1: This episode picks up where "School's In, Oh Bummer!" left off. Guest voices: Kate Micucci as Bimm and Rider Strong as Familiar with Erica Luttrell as Glory

=== Season 2 (2018–19) ===
No. overall	No. in season	Title	Written and storyboarded by	Story by	Original release date	Prod. code	U.S. viewers (millions)
53	1	"Collection Infection"	Gabe del Valle and Mike Pelensky	Kyle A. Carrozza and Richard Pursel	April 30, 2018 (Note: This episode first aired on March 3, 2018 in South-East Asia.)	653	0.42
Having pared down their Magisword collection, the Warriors are forced into unconventional battle choices on a dangerous mission into the Deepest Darkest Woods.
54	2	"To Balderly Go"	Clay Lindvall and Krystal Ureta	Kyle A. Carrozza and Richard Pursel	May 1, 2018 (Note: This episode first aired on March 4, 2018 in South-East Asia.)	654	0.39
Prohyas is crushed when his good hair day becomes a no hair day and Vambre has to battle a furry monster alone while her bro is in shock without his locks. Guest voices: Jinkx Monsoon as Hairmosa
55	3	"For the Love of Narwhal!"	Drew Green and Zoë Moss	Kyle A. Carrozza and Richard Pursel	May 2, 2018 (Note: This episode first aired on March 7, 2018 in Australia.)	655	0.45
Vambre rejects Darlin' Narwhal Magisword as being unfit for battle, but when Prohyas trains and brings out its full potential, Vambre resorts to improper extremes to get it back. Guest voices: Bonnie Gordon as Nana Mewfles and the Darlin' Narwhal Magisword, Mark Fite as Prohyas' heart and Pickle C, and Rosearik Rikki Simons as Dill and the Electric Eel Magisword
56	4	"Winning at Whining"	John Berry and Luke Ski	Kyle A. Carrozza and Richard Pursel	May 3, 2018 (Note: This episode first aired on March 8, 2018 in Australia.)	656	0.43
Vambre's challenge to Prohyas: Don't whine for the entirety of the next mission and you can have the Magiswords we get at the end. Guest voices: Renie Rivas as Scarriet and Nohandas
57	5	"Suitable Armor"	Gabe del Valle and Mike Pelensky	Kyle A. Carrozza and Richard Pursel	May 4, 2018 (Note: This episode first aired on March 9, 2018 in Australia.)	657	0.50
A veteran warrior insists that Vambre is underdressed for battle and takes it upon herself to garb Vambre in armor as Prohyas fights the beast solo without armor. Guest voices: Roz Ryan as Steel Magnolia and Rosearik Rikki Simons as Catthulu
58	6	"Changeable Terraingable"	Clay Lindvall and Krystal Ureta	Kyle A. Carrozza and Richard Pursel	May 7, 2018 (Note: This episode first aired on March 10, 2018 in Australia.)	658	0.42
Personality conflicts between Vambre and Prohyas come to a head as the Warriors miraculously manage to ace a mission at an ever-changing labyrinth. Guest voices: Dan Avidan as Dan
59	7	"Fixing-a-Flonk!"	Drew Green and Zoë Moss	Kyle A. Carrozza and Richard Pursel	May 8, 2018 (Note: This episode first aired on March 13, 2018 in Australia.)	659	0.43
Wanting to stop Flonk from being an evildoer for good, Prohyas tries to find Flonk a permanent venue for his nasty comedy. Vambre, however, wants to deliver him to the cops as usual. Guest voices: Paul Schrier as Flonk
60	8	"What's My Name? Starring Vambre and Prohyas Warrior!"	Luke Ski and Andrew Scherman	Kyle A. Carrozza and Richard Pursel	May 9, 2018 (Note: This episode first aired on March 14, 2018 in Australia.)	660	0.42
The Warriors go to extreme measures so folks remember their names.
61	9	"Ain't That a Kick in the Side?"	Gabe del Valle and Mike Pelensky	Kyle A. Carrozza and Richard Pursel	May 10, 2018 (Note: This episode first aired on March 15, 2018 in Australia.)	661	0.46
After Witch Way teases Prohyas by calling him "Vambre's sidekick", Prohyas intensifies his efforts to prove them wrong.
62	10	"Vambre's Guilty Pleasure"	Clay Lindvall and Krystal Ureta	Kyle A. Carrozza and Richard Pursel	May 11, 2018 (Note: This episode first aired on March 16, 2018 in Australia.)	662	0.44
Vambre tries her best to keep her tough Warrior reputation intact and still go to the cutesy-wootsy Piggiepie Jones stage show.
63	11	"Catbook: The Status of Cattus"	Drew Green and Zoë Moss	Kyle A. Carrozza and Richard Pursel	May 14, 2018 (Note: This episode first aired on March 19, 2018 in Australia.)	663	0.37
The Warriors want someone to enjoy collecting Magiswords as much as they do, so they go crazy trying to interest Cattus the One Blade into obtaining more.
64	12	"GOAT!"	John Berry and Luke Ski	Kyle A. Carrozza and Richard Pursel	May 15, 2018 (Note: This episode first aired on March 20, 2018 in Australia.)	664	0.40
Prohyas becomes obsessed with riding an uncooperative goat to get over a mountain. Guest voices: Rikki Simons as the Goat
65	13	"Team of Broccoli"	Gabe del Valle and Mike Pelensky	Kyle A. Carrozza and Richard Pursel	May 16, 2018 (Note: This episode first aired on April 8, 2018 in South-East Asia.)	665	0.36
The Warrior Family's broccoli crop is stolen and the Warriors and Danelda team up to track it down underground.
66	14	"Mall of Shame"	Clay Lindvall and Krystal Ureta	Kyle A. Carrozza and Richard Pursel	May 17, 2018 (Note: This episode first released on the Cartoon Network Website on April 29, 2018.)	666	0.45
Vambre gets locked inside Mount Ma'all so Prohyas tries to get her out while Vambre does her best to escape from the inside. Guest voices: Paget Brewster as Veronica Victorious
67	15	"Agent of Destruction"	Drew Green and Zoë Moss	Kyle A. Carrozza and Richard Pursel	May 18, 2018	667	0.45
DeBizz helps the Warriors become more famous as their agent, but Vambre returns to adventuring while Prohyas gets caught up in the DeBizz fame trap.
68	16	"Straining Day"	John Berry and Luke Ski	Kyle A. Carrozza and Richard Pursel	May 21, 2018	668	0.35
The Warriors teach Witchy Simone and her Slugburger crew how to use Magiswords. Prohyas teaches the basics while impatient Vambre tries to teach "the good stuff" too fast. Guest voices: Greg Cipes as Noel Trobblin
69	17	"Dunkadelic"	Gabe del Valle and Mike Pelensky	Kyle A. Carrozza and Richard Pursel	May 22, 2018	669	0.47
After suffering trauma from being the dunk-ee in a dunking booth, Prohyas has trouble getting through the dunk based traps in Man Fish's lair.
70	18	"The Incredible Tiny Warriors"	Clay Lindvall, Krystal Ureta, Drew Green, and Zoë Moss	Kyle A. Carrozza and Richard Pursel	May 23, 2018	670	0.39
71	19	"The Incredible Tiny Warriors"	Clay Lindvall, Krystal Ureta, Drew Green, and Zoë Moss	Kyle A. Carrozza and Richard Pursel	May 23, 2018	671	0.39
The Warriors must use a Legendary Magisword to defeat a giant king who wants to eat celebrities. This proves difficult when being eaten by the King makes Vambre feel very small.
72	20	"Helping Cattus Help"	John Berry and Luke Ski	Kyle A. Carrozza and Richard Pursel	May 24, 2018	672	0.40
The search for a mythical creature gets rather metaphysical when the equally elusive Cattus' assists the mission.
73	21	"Warts and All"	Gabe del Valle and Mike Pelensky	Kyle A. Carrozza and Richard Pursel	May 6, 2019 (Note: This episode was first released on the Cartoon Network App on August 23, 2018.)	673	0.24
Witchy Simone accidentally turns Vambre into a frog and Prohyas and Witchy try to change her back.
74	22	"Too Commercial!"	Clay Lindvall and Krystal Ureta	Kyle A. Carrozza and Richard Pursel	May 6, 2019	674	0.24
The Warriors go Advertising crazy; Grup has to stop them for their own good.
75	23	"Like Water for Bimm"	Drew Green and Zoë Moss	Kyle A. Carrozza and Richard Pursel	May 7, 2019 (Note: This episode was first released on the Cartoon Network App on August 23, 2018. On TV, it first aired on November 12, 2018 in France.)	675	0.25
Vambre helps to get Bimm over her mission crippling fear of water.
76	24	"The Pecking Order"	John Berry and Luke Ski	Kyle A. Carrozza and Richard Pursel	May 7, 2019	676	0.25
Professor Cyrus hires the warriors to take Frank-Paul through a treacherous mountain pass so he can molt at the top of Mt. Chickicken.
77	25	"Manlier Fish the Fishlier Man"	Gabe del Valle and Mike Pelensky	Kyle A. Carrozza and Richard Pursel	May 8, 2019	677	0.25
With the help of a conch shell genie, Man Fish upgrades himself in various ways to defeat the warriors.
78	26	"The Lanolion Sleeps Tonight"	Clay Lindvall and Krystal Ureta	Kyle A. Carrozza and Richard Pursel	May 8, 2019	678	0.25
Bimm and Familiar shadow the Warriors on a mission in the Sheepy Jungle, but put under such close scrutiny, the Warriors find that they're unable to be themselves!
79	27	"The Ballad of Sailor Sidney"	Drew Green and Zoë Moss	Kyle A. Carrozza and Richard Pursel	May 9, 2019	679	0.23
A Warrior mission to find missing Sailor Sidney for the Keelhaul Cove Pirates.
80	28	"Extreme Dreams"	John Berry and Luke Ski	Kyle A. Carrozza and Richard Pursel	May 9, 2019	680	0.23
Phibby Croax hires the Warriors for "The Most Extreme Experience Ever".
81	29	"Forever a Fishstick"	Gabe del Valle and Mike Pelensky	Kyle A. Carrozza and Richard Pursel	May 10, 2019	681	0.23
After a Misfire with Fishstick Magisword, Prohyas copes with completing Warrior missions as a fish stick.
82	30	"Sorry for Party OCHing"	Clay Lindvall and Krystal Ureta	Kyle A. Carrozza and Richard Pursel	May 10, 2019	682	0.23
The Warriors struggle to keep poise at Princess Zange's exclusive party.
83	31	"A Mind Is a Terrible Thing"	Drew Green and Zoë Moss	Kyle A. Carrozza and Richard Pursel	May 13, 2019	683	0.15
The Warriors easily thwart Phil's latest plan with Legendary Knowledge Magisword, so Phil repeatedly tries to steal it from them.
84	32	"Bewitched, Bothered, and Bothered Some More"	John Berry and Luke Ski	Kyle A. Carrozza and Richard Pursel	May 13, 2019	684	0.15
Flonk hires the Warriors to make Witch Way change his brother Helmut from a frog back to human.
85	33	"Train on a Snake"	Gabe del Valle and Mike Pelensky	Kyle A. Carrozza and Richard Pursel	May 14, 2019	685	0.17
Lady Hiss hires the Warriors to train her to be super tough.
86	34	"King of the Zombeez"	Clay Lindvall and Krystal Ureta	Kyle A. Carrozza and Richard Pursel	May 14, 2019	686	0.17
Frostferatu hires the Warriors to rid his castle of Zombeez when Neddy and a power mad zombie-bee queen take over.
87	35	"Hiccup the Volume"	Drew Green and Zoë Moss	Kyle A. Carrozza and Richard Pursel	May 15, 2019	687	0.23
Monkey Chunks has hiccups and Biblia Tick hires the Warriors to get rid of them.
88	36	"Ghosthaste"	John Berry and Luke Ski	Kyle A. Carrozza and Richard Pursel	May 15, 2019	688	0.23
Vambre becomes enamored of a Poltergeist within Ghost Magisword and Prohyas must save her sister before she becomes a ghost herself.
89	37	"Hangry Hangry Hoppus"	Gabe del Valle and Mike Pelensky	Kyle A. Carrozza and Richard Pursel	May 16, 2019	689	0.20
The Warriors battle a monster version of Hoppus, the rabbit transformed by the Cursed Garlic Magisword.
90	38	"Pachydermus Packard and the Camp of Fantasy"	Clay Lindvall and Krystal Ureta	Kyle A. Carrozza and Richard Pursel	May 16, 2019	690	0.20
A doctor orders Mr. Pachydermus to have an adventure, so he attends the Warriors' super-annoying "Fantasy Camp".
91	39	"Let's Team Up Because We Aren't Bad Friends"	Drew Green, Zoë Moss, John Berry, and Luke Ski	Kyle A. Carrozza and Richard Pursel	May 17, 2019	691	0.18
92	40	"Let's Team Up Because We Aren't Bad Friends"	Drew Green, Zoë Moss, John Berry, and Luke Ski	Kyle A. Carrozza and Richard Pursel	May 17, 2019	692	0.18
After finishing a battle with Francis Thingshooter, Prohyas and Vambre start thinking that maybe it is not fair to leave their friends out of their adventures. Omnibus then gives the Warriors a task: to find him a dinosaur that is believed to not exist called the Stegaroptorix. The Warriors see this as an opportunity to bring their friends Witchy Simone and Noville on a mission with them to Dinosaur Island. Through all the attempts to enlighten them, they don't seem to care much for it. Eventually King Rexxtopher catches the Warriors, saying they shouldn't be here, the Warriors (along with Simone and Noville) then decide to fight King Rexxtopher's team of dinosaurs. After the battle, the rare dinosaur runs into the forest, seeing this as an opportunity for a great adventure. When apparently nothing seems to interest them, Prohyas brings out a special guest star: Rad from OK K.O.! Let's Be Heroes. When they still seem uninterested, the Warriors bring the forest trees to life to trap Witchy Simone and Noville. When they find out that the reason they've been trying to leave and not caring is because they have their own lives now, Noville with a girlfriend and Witchy Simone with her job. They realize this and feel bad. Then Mr. Spoony arrives and saves them, they all decide to battle off the evil trees. Rad is given his own Magisword (a Magisword resembling K.O.'s hand that shoots Pow Cards). Eventually the Warriors apologize, but it annoys everyone. Prohyas and Vambre teaming up will not destroy every evil tree in the forest. The series concludes with the Warriors riding on the Stegoroptorix to Omnibus' house.

== Mighty Magiswords Vlogs! ==
These vlogs feature Vambre and Prohyas presenting each of their Magiswords to the audience watching them. These vlogs were recorded at creator Kyle Carrozza's desk in his CN office using a basic idea for each vlog with the dialogue completely ad-libbed, and were animated in-house at Cartoon Network Studios.

Although the first season vlogs were available on Cartoon Network's official YouTube channel and aired frequently on TV during promos, the second season vlogs were only aired and released on Cartoon Network's international channels. Creator Kyle Carrozza uploaded the entire collection in English on his secondary YouTube channel on April 3, 2022.

=== Season 1 Vlogs (2016–17) ===
No.	Title	Original air date	Production code
1	"Tomato Magisword"	September 29, 2016	101A
2	"Dolphin Magisword"	September 29, 2016	101B
3	"Zombie Pumpkin Magisword"	September 30, 2016	102A
4	"Mummy Magisword"	September 30, 2016	102B
5	"Retractable Ladder Magisword"	October 1, 2016	103A
6	"Rad Rocket Magisword"	October 2, 2016	103B
7	"Exploding Bubble Magisword"	October 3, 2016	104A
8	"Celery Magisword"	October 4, 2016	104B
9	"Clapping Magisword"	October 5, 2016	105A
10	"Pogo Stick Magisword"	October 6, 2016	105B
11	"Radiator Magisword"	October 7, 2016	106A
12	"Cactus Magisword"	October 8, 2016	106B
13	"Electric Razor Magisword"	October 9, 2016	107A
14	"Attractive Voice Magisword"	October 10, 2016	107B
15	"Soul Patch Magisword"	October 11, 2016	108A
16	"Ground Pound Magisword"	October 12, 2016	108B
17	"Excaliburger Magisword"	October 13, 2016	109A
18	"First Impressions"	October 22, 2016	109B
19	"Flashlight Magisword"	October 27, 2016	110A
20	"Play Date"	October 30, 2016	110B
21	"Spiderweb Magisword"	November 3, 2016	111A
22	"Odd Numbers Song"	November 5, 2016	111B
23	""Why?" Song"	November 10, 2016	112A
24	"We Ain't Got No Business"	November 12, 2016	112B
25	"Magisword Unboxing"	November 17, 2016	113A
26	"Prohyas Unboxing: Monobrow Magisword!"	November 24, 2016	113B
27	"Prohyas Unboxes a New Magisword!"	November 26, 2016	114A
28	"Onion Magisword"	December 3, 2016	114B
29	"My Day"	December 8, 2016	115A
30	"Dreams"	December 10, 2016	115B
31	"Meet Lady Hiss!"	December 15, 2016	116A
32	"Meet Skullivan!"	December 17, 2016	116B
33	"Wickersnapper Magisword"	December 24, 2016	117A
34	"Microphone Magisword"	December 29, 2016	117B
35	"Purple Pete – Song"	December 31, 2016	118A
36	"Colors"	April 17, 2017 (MagiMobile)	118B
37	"Cuppa Joe Magisword"	April 17, 2017 (MagiMobile)	119A
38	"Electric Eel Magisword"	April 17, 2017 (MagiMobile)	119B
39	"Enchanted Pork"	May 5, 2017 (MagiMobile)	120A
40	"Sharkblade Magisword"	May 5, 2017 (MagiMobile)	120B
41	"Laser Pointer Magisword"	May 5, 2017 (MagiMobile)	121A
42	"Vambre Reviews Veronica Victorious"	May 5, 2017 (MagiMobile)	121B
43	"Dummystein Magisword"	May 5, 2017 (MagiMobile)	122A
44	"Onion Magisword"	May 5, 2017 (MagiMobile)	122B
45	"Little Blue Bomb Magisword"	May 5, 2017 (MagiMobile)	123A
46	"Lost Sandwich"	May 5, 2017 (MagiMobile)	123B
47	"Meet Super Mighty Robot Piggeh!"	May 5, 2017 (MagiMobile)	124A

=== Season 2 Vlogs: Vloggin' on the Roof (2022) ===
No.	Title	Original air date	Production code
1	"Grabby Giraffe Magisword"	April 3, 2022	124B
2	"Magnet Magisword"	April 3, 2022	125A
3	"Monster Suit Magisword"	April 3, 2022	125B
4	"Chillax Mist Magisword"	April 3, 2022	126A
5	"Catnip Mouse Magisword"	April 3, 2022	126B
6	"Choo-Choo Magisword"	April 3, 2022	127A
7	"Bite Beast Magisword"	April 3, 2022	127B
8	"Extendo Flick Magisword"	April 3, 2022	128A
9	"Glow Stick Magisword"	April 3, 2022	128B
10	"Slime Magisword"	April 3, 2022	129A
11	"Sun Face Magisword"	April 3, 2022	129B
12	"Rainbow Glasses Magisword"	April 3, 2022	130A
13	"Kite Magisword"	April 3, 2022	130B
