= Christmas in Tattertown =

1988 film

- Created by: Ralph Bakshi
- Written by: Tom Minton; Jim Reardon
- Directed by: Ralph Bakshi
- Voices of: Charlie Adler; Adrian Arnold; Arthur Burghardt; Jennifer Darling; Keith David; Sherry Lynn; Patrick Pinney
- Composer: Gary Anderson
- Country of origin: United States
- Original language: English
- No. of episodes: 1

Production
- Executive producer: Tom Klein
- Producer: Ralph Bakshi
- Animators: Ed Bell; Kent Butterworth; Charlie Downs; Tony Fucile; Steve Gordon; Mike Kazaleh; Steve Markowski; Tom Minton; Virgil Ross; Irven Spence; Phil Young
- Editor: Brad Gunther
- Running time: 30 minutes
- Production company: Bakshi Animation

Original release
- Network: Nickelodeon
- Release: December 21, 1988

Christmas in Tattertown is a 1988 animated television Christmas special created and directed by Ralph Bakshi. The special was an unsold pilot episode for a series, Tattertown, about a place where everything discarded in the world came alive. It aired on the cable television network Nickelodeon.

== Synopsis ==
A high-strung, self-absorbed young girl named Debbie opens a magic book, sucking her, a stuffed dog, and her doll Miss Muffet into the realm of Tattertown, a Fleischeresque world where discarded items come to life. Miss Muffet rejoices at her newfound sentience and freedom until Debbie attempts to reassert her dominance. Muffet runs off and transforms herself into Muffet the Merciless, set on conquering Tattertown. Sidney the Spider, a villain who had previously made failed attempts at conquering Tattertown, takes Muffet to the "Deadster Zone", the home of "unsavory characters" such as war toys and weapons, to recruit the denizens into her army.

A homesick Debbie decides to introduce the concept of Christmas to Tattertown, where no one has ever heard of the holiday. She recruits Mr. Tannenbaum, a stereotypically Jewish evergreen merchant, to serve as the Christmas tree. When Muffet learns of Debbie's plans, she flashes back to past trauma of rough handling during the Christmas season and vows to stop Debbie's efforts. She decides to launch an airstrike on Tattertown disguised as Santa Claus, with Sidney as all eight reindeer, but when the real Santa flies over Tattertown, the air fleet crashes into itself, creating a fireworks display that impresses Santa and the town. Frustrated that the Tattertown residents' idea of Christmas doesn't match her view of it, Debbie plays the original recording of Bing Crosby's "White Christmas" as a last resort. Tattertown is overcome by love and compassion, all except an enraged Muffet, who lands in jail.

While the residents did consider "White Christmas" to be a beautiful song, it is never resolved whether anyone ever grasped the true meaning of Christmas.

== History ==
Bakshi originated the idea for Tattertown in high school, where it was originally a comic strip called Junk Town. The strip made light of the human condition by showing the value of things we throw away.

Bakshi worked with Nickelodeon to bring his strip to life as a regular television series, which would have served as Nickelodeon's first original animated series. In 1988, they commissioned him to create a pilot for the series. The pilot was animated by Ed Bell, Kent Butterworth, Charlie Downs, Tony Fucile, Steve Gordon, Mike Kazaleh, Steve Markowski, Tom Minton, Virgil Ross, Irven Spence, and Phil Young, with overseas animation done by Wang Film Productions and supervised by David Marshall. The music was composed by Gary M. Anderson. The pilot aired on December 21, 1988, during the network's Nick at Nite block of programming.

Originally the series was to be picked up in 1989 for 39 episodes, but after a controversy involving an episode from Bakshi's other series Mighty Mouse: The New Adventures, the project was abandoned. Nickelodeon renamed the pilot Christmas in Tattertown and aired it annually as a special until 1992. Bakshi has retained rights to the pilot and the characters. In an interview on his official website conducted on August 2, 2007, he confirmed a DVD release; however, no such release has happened.

In 1995, the special aired in syndication under the title A Tattertown Christmas alongside the Rocko's Modern Life Christmas special "Rocko's Modern Christmas!".

== Cast ==
- Charlie Adler - Stuffed Dog / Sidney the Spider / Wendell / Additional Voices
- Keith David - Miles the Saxophone / Plane #2 / Additional Voices
- Jennifer Darling - Muffet
- Sherry Lynn - Debbie / Doll / Hanger / Additional Voices
- Adrian Arnold - Harvey
- Arthur Burghardt - Santa Claus / Policeman / Additional Voices
- Patrick Pinney - Herbert Tannenbaum / Tad / Pie / Wreath / Magazine / G-Man / Microphone / Spoon / Fly / Lumberjack / Plane #1 / Additional Voices

== See also ==
- List of programs broadcast by Nickelodeon
