= Villainous (TV series) =

Mexican animated television and web series

- Spanish: Villanos
- English: Villainous
- Genre: Black comedy; Comedy horror; Science fantasy; Parody; Satire; Surreal comedy
- Created by: Alan Ituriel
- Based on: Villainous 2012 web series by Alan Ituriel
- Written by: Alan Ituriel, Diego Valenzuela, and Merril Hagan (webisodes); Diego Valenzuela, Dave Tennant, and Alan Ituriel (pilot)
- Directed by: Alan Ituriel
- Voices of: Alan Ituriel; Todd Sayre (pilot/shorts); Melaney Sems (pilot/shorts); Mark Fischbach; Amanda Rose (pilot/shorts); Yian Ruiz (TV series; dub); Cindy Eliz Pérez (TV series; dub)
- Composer: Kevin Manthei
- Country of origin: Mexico
- Original languages: Spanish; English
- No. of seasons: 1
- No. of episodes: 6

Production
- Executive producers: Mayte Sanz; Humberto Cervera
- Running time: 1 minute (webisodes); 11 minutes (specials); 11–14 minutes (episodes)
- Production companies: Animated Imagination Studios; Cartoon Network Latin America Original Productions

Original release
- Network: Cartoon Network; Cartoon Network Anything
- Release: May 18, 2017 – February 19, 2019
- Network: Max; Cartoon Network Mexico
- Release: October 29, 2021

Villainous (Spanish: Villanos) is a Mexican animated television and web series produced by Animated Imagination Studios (previously for Cartoon Network and HBO Max, until 2025, when it was mentioned that its spin-off, Villanous: Ties of Thieves, will be released by Animated Imagination Studios on their YouTube channel). It was created by Alan Ituriel, a veteran of the animation industry in Mexico. It is based on a 2012 web series of the same name which Ituriel had previously created and was initially picked up by Cartoon Network Latin America as a miniseries of ten one-minute episodes for the Cartoon Network Anything app (further episodes, along with a series of specials, were released later). The series is co-produced by Cartoon Network (through its Latin America Original Production unit) and A.I. Animation Studios. The series has since expanded onto a media franchise consistent of books and tie-ins.

On October 11, 2021, Ituriel's Animated Imagination Studios revealed that the series would be released on HBO Max Latin America and Cartoon Network Mexico, and premiered on both platforms on October 29, 2021. The series premiered on Max in the United States on May 23, 2023.

On May 15, 2025, it was announced that an exclusive web series spin-off entitled Villainous: Ties of Thieves (Spanish: Villanos: Lazos de Ladrones) was in production, set to be released in late 2025, but was delayed. On April 26, 2026, it was announced that the second part of the first season would premiere in 2027, with 20 episodes.

== Plot ==
Villainous follows Black Hat Org., run by the evil mastermind Black Hat (whose name is a synonym for villain, a reference to black-hatted evil cowboys from western films), and his team of three less-villainous aides. Black Hat Org's mission is to assist other villains to solve their heroic problems. They sell evil inventions created by Dr. Flug and offer various services, such as advice on how to defeat the hero or take care of the hero themselves. However, things usually end up going wrong as the brilliant innovations and plans tend to have small and often comical flaws.

== Characters ==
=== Main ===
- Black Hat (voiced by Alan Ituriel) is an ancient and malevolent mastermind of unknown origin or species who runs Black Hat Org. He has seemingly limitless power, and can shapeshift, teleport, manipulate space and reality, conjure objects at will, and open portals to other dimensions with his claws. He also owns a snake named Lil 'Jack, carries a walking stick he created from his own shadow, and can make people go out of their minds if he sings.
- Dr. Kenning "Flug" Flugslys (voiced by Yian Ruiz (English, TV series), Todd Sayre (English, pilot/shorts) and José Antonio Macías (Spanish)) is a nervous, nerdy, but somewhat kind and respectful scientist who wears multiple paper bags over his head and works for Black Hat. Despite his kind nature, Flug can be violent, malicious, and cruel when need be. One of his aliases is "La Bolsa de Torta" (The Sandwich Bag).
- Demencia (voiced by Cindy Eliz Pérez (English, TV series), Melaney Sems (English, pilot/shorts) and Melissa Gedeón (Spanish)) is Black Hat's crazed fan and assistant who wears a tracking device. Her outfit is inspired by reptiles and she has a love for destruction, chaos, and mischief. If she crouches down, because of her hair's massive length and color, her hair covers her body and she resembles a lizard. She can crawl on walls, has enhanced senses, has seemingly superhuman levels of strength despite her thin build, and has shown several times to be cannibalistic.
- 5.0.5. (voiced by Mark "Markiplier" Fischbach) is an immortal bear-like experiment created by the Organization. Intended to be an evil creature, he instead became very loving and enjoys hugging his friends. He has a single flower sprouting from his head that wilts and grows based on his emotions, and closes when he is asleep. 5.0.5 sees Dr. Flug as a father more than a creator and sees Demencia as his troublesome sister. Black Hat, however, sees him as a personal punching bag to relieve stress.

=== Supporting ===
- Cam Bot is a sentient camera who films all of Black Hat Org.'s ads.
- Penumbra / Dr. Penelope Numan Braxton (voiced by Jinon Deeb (English, redubbed pilot), Amanda Rose (English, original pilot) and Rebeca Manríquez (Spanish)) is a villainess who has a disorder that causes her to burn in daylight. Half of Arteno's population were infected with this condition by a toxic cloud and were dubbed Numbras. Arteno City now treats the Numbras as second-class citizens and has segregated them to the north side of the city.

=== P.E.A.C.E. ===
- Ringworm (voiced by Stephen Schoer Silva (Spanish) and Sean Davis (English)), a hero with ringworm who can generate ring bolts.
- Bicep (voiced by Roly Gutierrez (English) and Daniel del Robe (Spanish)), a boxer-themed superhero who resembles Sylvester Stallone's Rocky Balboa character from the Rocky film series, whom has superhuman strength.
- G-Lo / Gloria Grentina (voiced by Yenni Ann (English) and Alicia Velez (Spanish)), a gelatinous heroine with extendable limbs. She was Bicep's sidekick but after Bicep got beat up by Black Hot's henchman Dr. Flex, she became a sidekick for hire.
- Bulldozer (voiced by Diego Valenzuela (Spanish) and David Steel (English)), a buff construction worker-themed superhero with a wrecking ball for a hand whom he names "Berry" and also talks for her. He claims to be afraid of nothing except for bears (including 505).

=== Other characters ===
- Airlock / Amanda Hamilton Weaver (voiced by Jinon Deeb (English, unmasked), Doug Turkel (English, masked) and Rebeca Patiño (Spanish)), a superheroine with a robotic arm who resembles Samus Aran from the Metroid game series.
- Black Hot / Sexy Black Hat (voiced by Mark Fischbach (English), Alan Ituriel (Spanish)), a "clone" of Black Hat created by the Evil ray in "The Perception of Evil", He was created by Demencia. In "BH's Bizzare Bad-Venture" he runs away and created his own organization with stronger opposites of the employees: Dr. Flex (voiced by Roly Gutierrez (English) and José Antonio Macías (Spanish)), Violencia (voiced by Connie Fernandez (English), and Melissa Gedeón (Spanish)) and 6.0.6. (a cactus).
- Bonnivet (voiced by series animator Carolina Páez (Spanish, Villainous) and Patricia Azán (English & Spanish, Ties of Thieves)), a character that first appears in "The Lost Cases of Elmore", is a Supreme Leader of some type.
- Curie is the pet rat of Penumbra which was once used for experiments in a laboratory in Atreno City until Penumbra rescued it.
- Dark Phantom / Ezequiel Aterborn VI (voiced by Daniel Hoyo on Orientation #10, Pascual Meza in S1E6 (Spanish) and Sahid Pabon (English)), first appears in "The Lost Cases of Rhyboflavin" and is a professional villain, who is secretive. He is accompanied by his henchman Ghoul (voiced by Jason Kesser (English) and Alejandro Orozco (Spanish)).
- Earl, also called Dopey Black Hat, is a "clone" of Black Hat created by Monstrous Black Hat in "The Perception of Evil".
- El Valiente / Pedro Moreno (voiced by Jose Aparicio (English) and Guillermo Coria (Spanish)), a famous Mexican luchador whose mind was controlled by the cursed wrestling mask Mascara Macabra (voiced by Jose Aparicio (English) and Humberto Vélez (Spanish)), whom he won from a match against him. The mask gives him superhuman strength yet drives him to obsession over being victorious. His wife, former P.E.A.C.E. operative Adelita Guerrero (voiced by Margarita Coego (English) and Magdalena Leonel (Spanish)) approached the Black Hat Organization to rescue him from the mask.
- Emilia (voiced by Lourdes Arruti (Spanish) and Jackie Rodriguez (English)), an orphaned ghost girl who lives in a haunted house along with other children spirits.
- Hatbot-lers robots created in the image of Black Hat.
- Hatbot-Sentinels also known as Hatbots, are Black Hat-looking robots that belong to a Black Hat Organization robot line specifically designed to cause havoc during Christmas time celebrations.
- Goldheart / Herbert Leth (voiced by Oliver Roberts (English, original pilot) and Edson Matus (Spanish)) is a superhero who was Dr. Flug's rival and former nemesis during his years in high school, Flug still has a grudge against him and finds out by Miss Heed that he's going to stop villainy once and for all.
- Illuminarrow / Elizabeth Easton (voiced by Nola Klop (English, Ties of Thieves) and Regina Tiscareno (Spanish. Ties of Thieves)), a villain with an Eye of Providence motif who was created by Ami Guillén and Aleck Parker as a joke. Ami did not accept Illuminarrow as her daughter and abandoned her, hence her evilness.
- Lady Naga is a female villainess who briefly appears in "Q&A Black Hat Organization replies" during a slideshow while Flug lists off examples of respectable female villains.
- The Men Without Hats is an unknown organization that plans to overthrow Black Hat, there presence are shown as secret messages at the end of the title sequence.
- Metauro / Dimas Reldón Soler (voiced by Diego Valenzuela), a "professional villain" that was threatened and used to advertise Black Hat Organization's evil plans for villains.
- Miss Heed / Cecilia Amanda Kelly (voiced by Katherine Clavelo (English) and Cristina Hernández (Spanish)), a very well-known superheroine, influencer, and designer who has her own merchandise that includes perfumes, action figures, and dolls. It is revealed that she was a friend of Flug's during high school, who aims for the affections of Goldheart. She has the ability to evaporate liquids, and she uses it to blow air kisses modified with the formula of her perfume and put her foes in an obedient love-trance. Though she may be a hero she has an obsession for attention due to her controlling heroes, villains and civilians as mindless followers and planned to make a stronger perfume to mind control the entire globe to become the most beloved hero in the world just so Goldheart could love her again.
- Monstrous Black Hat, a "clone" of Black Hat created by the Evil ray in "The Perception of Evil". He was created by 5.0.5.
- The Pirate, an unnamed character who first appeared in the webisode "Hooked". He is a ship captain, and the victim of an unnamed magical boy's taunting.
- Sunblast / Saúl Solis (voiced by Roly Gutiérrez (English, redubbed pilot), Herschel "IV" Hatcher (English, original pilot) and Manuel Pérez (Spanish), a powerful superhero of Arteno City and Penumbra's arch-enemy, he acts more like a school bully instead of a hero as he cares more for his popularity from Arteno's citizens and hates nerds. He was then defeated by Dr. Flug and his colleagues and shrink him down which Penumbra takes custody of him where they later become friends.
- V.I.R.U.S. (voiced by Sean Davis (English) and Raúl Anaya (Spanish)), an artificial intelligence that inhabits a space station who plans to expose vital information on the internet (which was actually the leaked final episode of Flug's favorite show "Code: Turkey"), the government hired superheroine Airlock to erase him from the internet which leads him to ask Black Hat's associates for help.
- Vanity Bolt, a character that first appears in "The Lost Cases of Rhyboflavin". Dark Phantom is his enemy.

== Production and release ==
The original Villainous webisodes were written, animated, and voiced by Alan Ituriel in 2012 for ThatPlaceToHangOut.com, an art website he jointly worked on. He had to use royalty-free music and voice all characters. He later said he was inspired by Guillermo del Toro and Captain Hook in Peter Pan. During the production of the new series, Cartoon Network was able to sign on YouTuber and popular Internet gamer Markiplier as the voice of 5.0.5. and attached a professional composer, Kevin Manthei, both upon request by Ituriel, to the project. Ituriel remained in control over most aspects as director, writer, storyboard artist, animator and voice of Black Hat. The English version is initially recorded first at TRACKS Productions using an Atlanta-based cast (with the exception of Ituriel and Markiplier) while the Spanish version was dubbed afterward at Dubbing House in Mexico. Apart from Ituriel, Markiplier, and Manthei, Carolina Paez was an animator, as was Kevin Martínez, and Diego Valenzuela wrote various episodes. A teaser trailer was also released on September 8, 2018.

The Villainous concept was pitched by Alan Ituriel at a contest run at the Pixelatl Festival in Cuernavaca, called IdeaToon Summit, in 2014. He met some Cartoon Network executives there and the concept was judged to fit the 6-11 year old demographic for CN Anything original content. Villainous has garnered very positive reception on Cartoon Network's online platforms, like the Cartoon Network's Anything application in 2016, leading CN to decide to continue their own "Pitch Me" competition through at least 2017 in an aim to find more web original shows. Villainous is the first of what CN hopes to be many successful short projects for their app and YouTube channel.

A TV pilot was released on June 8, 2019, with the Spanish-language version released seven days earlier, while a full-length series is currently in development. Ituriel later confirmed that season one was in production, while also announcing a new character, with a backdoor pilot later debuting as the Victor and Valentino episode "Villainy in Monte Macabre". Unlike the shorts, due to Warner Bros. merger with Discovery and the COVID-19 pandemic, while simultaneously produced in both languages (with scripts still written in English), the series was recorded in Spanish first at SDI Media in Mexico and dubbed in English afterwards replacing most of the original cast save for Alan Ituriel and Markiplier with a Miami-based cast at VOA Studios Miami, released on November 24, 2022.

On October 11, 2021, it was revealed that the series would be released on HBO Max Latin America and Cartoon Network Mexico, and it premiered on both platforms on October 29, 2021. The series made its American debut on Max on May 23, 2023. In November 2024, the fandom community of the series released a campaign to get Cartoon Network to release season 2 after multiple delays and a 3-year hiatus, under the hashtag "#RELEASEVILLAINOUS".

== Episodes ==
Note: Episodes are produced in English and dubbed in Spanish afterward. (Note: Below are the original English and Spanish dub titles for the one-minute shorts that Cartoon Network has approved and the small, fifteen-second shorts that are released on the CN Anything app to promote the show, ordered by their official YouTube compilation.)

Season	Episodes	Originally released	
Season	Episodes	First released	Last released
Shorts	29	May 18, 2017	February 19, 2019
Pilot		June 1, 2019	
1	5	October 29, 2021	

=== Shorts (2017–19) ===
==== Phase One (2017) ====
The first wave of English and Spanish-language shorts which were released on a video on the Cartoon Network Latin America YouTube channel.

No.	Title	Directed by	Written by	Storyboarded by	Original release date
1	"The Perception of Evil"; Transliteration: "La Percepción del Mal"	Joon Seong Ahn, Alan Ituriel, & Chan-Young Park	Seonhwa Geum, Merrill Hagan, Alan Ituriel, Dave Tennant, & Diego Valenzuela	Ui Seok Cho, Seonhwa Geum, Seung Hyun Go, Alan Ituriel, Chey Lee, & Sang-Yeon Park	May 18, 2017
Black Hat shows viewers a device that can make a person's most vile thoughts come to life. Dr. Flug creates an unpleasant sandwich, leading Black Hat to create a clone of himself. While he is satisfied, 5.0.5 unknowingly takes the device to make a deformed Black Hat, then drops it, leading that Black Hat to create a more deformed version of himself. Demencia sees this and thinks the device creates clones, creating a huge, muscular version of Black Hat, which then ends the episode.
2	"Ice Cream of Fear"; Transliteration: "Helado de Miedo"	Unknown	Unknown	TBA	May 18, 2017
Black Hat finds 5.0.5 who is enjoying ice cream until it falls to the floor. Seeing him sad, Black Hat puts the ice cream back in the hand of 5.0.5, but it has turned into a demon. Black Hat takes this back, then scares it into submission.
3	"Bigger, Badder"; Transliteration: "Más Grande, más Malo"	Unknown	Unknown	TBA	May 18, 2017
Black Hat greets viewers, then presents a new product: a ray gun that shrinks or grows whatever object its laser hits. Dr. Flug describes the product, and Black Hat is satisfied, using it on 5.0.5., but accidentally grows him to the size of Godzilla. 5.0.5. then breaks out of the manor, causing chaos outside, and Black Hat attempts to advertise 5.0.5. as a weapon of mass destruction to make the best of a bad situation.
4	"Squeak"; Transliteration: "Chirrido"	Unknown	Unknown	Alan Ituriel, Carolina Páez, Diego Mejia, and Kevin Martínez	May 18, 2017
5.0.5. is drawing on a chalkboard and Demencia scratches her nails on the board, doing so until Black Hat does the same. However, he rips open a portal to a demon dimension, causing dismay to Demencia and 5.0.5.
5	"Horribly Heavy"; Transliteration: "Horriblemente Pesado"	Unknown	Unknown	TBA	May 18, 2017
Black Hat shows his new product, an anti-gravity ray gun but when Dr. Flug explains that it is actually a field generator for anti-gravity field. Testing it, Black Hat causes everything in the room to end up floating and becomes enraged at Dr. Flug. Afterward, Demenica chews on it, deactivating it, but she presses it, and it floats to 5.0.5., who nervously eats the device.
6	"Wearing Evil"; Transliteration: "Vistiendo la Maldad"	Unknown	Diego Valenzuela	TBA	May 18, 2017
Disguised as 5.0.5., Black Hat breaks a jeweled egg, and attempts to fix the egg. Demencia, dressed like Black Hat, tries to scare who she thinks is 5.0.5., then reveals herself. She laughs until Black Hat shrieks at her and transforms to his usual form, easily fixing the egg by snapping his fingers.
7	"Bad Security"; Transliteration: "Seguridad Mala"	Unknown	Unknown	TBA	May 18, 2017
Black Hat shows off a security system, but cannot return to the manor because Dr. Flug never thought of making a deactivation switch. Black Hat then kicks Dr. Flug over the fence so he can disarm the system. After surviving everything the security system throws at him, the doctor ultimately deactivates the system, and Black Hat enters his manor.
8	"The Portrait of Evil"; Transliteration: "El Retrato del Mal"	Unknown	Diego Valenzuela	TBA	May 18, 2017
5.0.5., dressed like a maid, enters the room and fixes a crooked painting of Black Hat. Then, Demencia comes down the wall and moves it back to its original, crooked angle, and 5.0.5. fixes it. The two go back and forth until the Black Hat in the portrait itself slams it against the painting, sending the whole manor askew, sending 5.0.5. and Demencia out of the manor.
9	"Sculpting Evil"; Transliteration: "Esculpiendo Maldad"	Unknown	Diego Valenzuela	TBA	May 18, 2017
Black Hat introduces a new product named the Medusa Device, saying it creates statues of its user. Unsatisfied with Flug's example, he creates a more flattering statue of himself. 5.0.5. creates a cute statue of himself and Black Hat, and Dr. Flug fixes it. Demencia then messes with the statue and tries flirting with Black Hat, angering him. Everyone begins creating statues until Black Hat breaks the chaos. He tries to create a new statue but is not successful because the device's battery has run out. The final statue ends up being the cutest one made. Black Hat rips his face off in frustration.
10	"The Note of Destruction"; Transliteration: "La Nota de Destrucción"	Unknown	Diego Valenzuela	TBA	May 18, 2017
Before Dr. Flug can drop a chemical into a flask, Demencia interrupts him with her electric guitar. Black Hat moves Demencia out of the way with an enormous organ. He plays a chord and creates a sound wave so powerful that 5.0.5.'s eyes fall out.

==== Orientation Videos for Villains (2017–19) ====
This is a series of 10-to-11-minute English and Spanish-language specials that feature Black Hat and Dr. Flug criticizing villains from other Cartoon Network shows. The Q&A special is an exception, at 14 minutes and without a focus on a particular villain.

No.	Title	Directed by	Written by	Storyboarded by	Original release date
1	"The Lost Cases of Ooo"; Transliteration: "Los casos perdidos de Ooo"	Alan Ituriel and Dennis "Snonny" Moreno Porfis (live-action sequence)	Alan Ituriel, Diego Valenzuela, Humberto Cervera Baron and Diego Mejia	TBA	November 5, 2017
Black Hat and Dr. Flug criticize the villainy of Earl of Lemongrab from Adventure Time (2010–2018).
2	"The Lost Cases of Rhyboflavin"; Transliteration: "Los casos perdidos de Rhyboflaven"	Unknown	Alan Ituriel, Diego Valenzuela, Humberto Cervera and Kyle A. Carrozza (only for Magiswords facts)	TBA	December 2, 2017
Black Hat criticizes Nohyas from Mighty Magiswords (2016–2019).
3	"The Lost Cases of Boxmore"; Transliteration: "Los casos perdidos de Boxmore"	Alan Ituriel and Carolina Páez	Carolina Páez, Diego Valenzuela, Humberto Cervera Baron, Alan Ituriel and Ian Jones-Quartey (only for OK KO! facts)	TBA	January 9, 2018
Black Hat analyzes the villainy of Lord Boxman from OK K.O.! Let's Be Heroes (2017–2019).
4	"The Lost Cases of Townsville"; Transliteration: "Los casos perdidos de Saltadilla"	Unknown	Tout Le Monde	TBA	February 3, 2018
Black Hat and Dr. Flug criticize the villainy of Mojo Jojo from The Powerpuff Girls (1998–2005).
5	"The Lost Cases of Elmore"; Transliteration: "Los casos perdidos de Elmore"	Unknown	Unknown	TBA	March 18, 2018
Black Hat and Dr. Flug analyze the villainy of Rob/Dr. Wrecker from The Amazing World of Gumball (2011–2019).
6	"Guide for an Evil Conquest"; Transliteration: "Guía para una conquista malvada"	Unknown	Unknown	TBA	April 9, 2018
Dr. Flug explains how an evil conquest should be while he looks at Vilgax from Ben 10 (2016–2021).
7	"The Lost Cases of the Future"; Transliteration: "Los casos perdidos del futuro"	Unknown	Alan Ituriel, Diego Valenzuela and Diego Mejia	TBA	May 5, 2018
Black Hat and Dr. Flug examine the villainy of Aku from Samurai Jack (2001–2017).
8	"The Lost Cases of Beach City"; Transliteration: "Los casos perdidos de Ciudad Playa"	Unknown	Alan Ituriel, Diego Valenzuela and Diego Mejia	TBA	June 2, 2018
Dr. Flug and Demencia look at Peridot and Jasper from Steven Universe (2013–2019).
9	"The Lost Cases of the Park"; Transliteration: "Los casos perdidos del parque"	Kevin Martinez (animation)	Alan Ituriel, Diego Mejia and Benji Santiago	TBA	July 14, 2018
Black Hat and Dr. Flug examine Anti-Pops from Regular Show (2010–2017).
10	"The Lost Cases of the Tree House"; Transliteration: "Los casos perdidos de la casa del árbol"	Diego Mejia (animation supervisor and co-director)	Alan Ituriel, Carolina Páez, Benji Santiago, Diego Mejia and Mr. Warburton (KND parts only)	TBA	August 18, 2018
Dr. Flug examines The Delightful Children from Down the Lane from Codename: Kids Next Door (2002–2008).
11	"Q&A: Black Hat Organization Responds"	Unknown	Unknown	TBA	February 19, 2019
Black Hat, Dr. Flug, 5.0.5, and Demencia answer a Q&A.

==== Phase Two (2017–19) ====
No.	Title	Directed by	Written by	Storyboarded by	Original release date
1	"Horrible Holidays"; Transliteration: "Horribles fiestas"	Unknown	Diego Valenzuela	TBA	December 21, 2017
Dr. Flug, Demencia, 5.0.5, and Cam Bot hang out for the holidays.
2	"The Foul Flower"; Transliteration: "La flor fétida"	Unknown	Diego Valenzuela	TBA	February 18, 2018
Dr. Flug and Black Hat try to grow a fowl flower.
3	"Dementia WuZ Here"; Transliteration: "Demencia eZtubo aquí"	Unknown	Diego Valenzuela	TBA	March 8, 2018
Demencia hijacks the feed, showing herself going on missions where she steals bombs, attacks a rabbit and a snake, claiming she can deal with or infiltrate any situation. Later, Dr. Flug is threatened by Black Hat when he notes reports of a slithering slug.
4	"Black Hat Organization: 2018 Anniversary"; Transliteration: "Black Hat Organization: Aniversario 2018"	Unknown	Diego Valenzuela	TBA	May 15, 2018
Black Hat, Dr. Flug, Demencia, 5.0.5, and Cam Bot celebrate the 2018 anniversary of Black Hat.
5	"Trap-ical Resort"; Transliteration: "¡Verano!"	Unknown	Diego Valenzuela	TBA	June 15, 2018
The terrifying "resort" of Black Hat.
6	"Black Hat Challenge"; Transliteration: "Desafío Black Hat"	Unknown	Diego Valenzuela	TBA	October 30, 2018
The first challenge is outlined by Black Hat and those that work for him.
7	"Black Hat Challenge II"; Transliteration: "Desafío Black Hat II"	Unknown	Diego Valenzuela	TBA	October 30, 2018
The second challenge is outlined by Black Hat and those that work for him.
8	"Black Hat Challenge III"; Transliteration: "Desafío Black Hat III"	Unknown	Diego Valenzuela	TBA	October 30, 2018
The third challenge is outlined by Black Hat and those that work for him.

=== Pilot (2019) ===
No.	Title (Note: Spanish title taken from tweet by Alan Ituriel on May 28, 2019)	Written by	Storyboarded by	Original release date	English air date
1	"The Dreadful Dawn"; Transliteration: "El Atroz Amanecer"	Diego Valenzuela, Dave Tennant & Alan Ituriel	Ariadna "Ami" Guillén & Alan Ituriel	June 1, 2019	June 4, 2019
Black Hat gets a contract from Penumbra to defeat a hero named Sunblast, ruining her plan to block out the sun. Dr. Flug and his team (Demencia and 5.0.5) go to Atreno City to capture him, although they face a challenge in doing so, due to Demencia and 5.0.5 not following Flug's careful plan. Note: The pilot is considered part of season 1.

=== Season 1 (2021) ===
No. overall	No. in season	Title	Storyboarded by	Original release date	English air date
2	2	"Boo!-Lldozing"; Transliteration: "¡Boo-Lldozer!"	Ariadna "Ami" Guillén, Carlos Ramirez Bernal, Lucia Delgado Mixcoatl, Ornella Antista and Diana Vanessa Montoya Galvaldon	October 29, 2021	May 23, 2023
Three kids, resembling those from Scooby-Doo, visit a dump, with one spray-painting "this dump sucks" and they are terrified when the boards move, with their spray painting changed to "I'll thump you kids." A ghost comes out of the fence. The ghost then returns to her dwelling and sees a broadcast that the dump will be demolished by a person named "Bulldozer," with her and her fellow ghosts scared, and Black Hat hijacks the TV, offering to help them. Dr. Flug runs from a hero, Ringworm, who is trying to hurt him and is attacking Demencia. Both are captured. Thanks to 5.0.5., Demencia punches Ringworm in the face, terrifying 5.0.5., while Dr. Flug also escapes his bounds. Dr. Flug and Demencia criticized 5.0.5. and he cries. Black Hat brings them back to his headquarters, with Ringworm delivered to trolls who will eat him. Dr. Flug, Demencia, and 5.0.5. are ordered to stop Bulldozer. Dr. Flug gives 5.0.5. the job to clean the ship, to his detriment. Demenica and Flug enter the house, with Flug running in fear of its supernatural quirks, while Demencia meets the ghost kids. Flug is brought back inside and the ghost shows him around their sentient home, known as the Bandit House, while Demencia takes selfies along the way. The ghost family are afraid that Bulldozer will take down the house, but Flug makes the ghosts happy when he says they will come with a plan to scare Bulldozer away. 5.0.5, inside the ship, tries to remain scary. Nothing seems to be stopping Bulldozer, as he easily overpowers them with his wrecking ball hand named Berry. He makes it to the heart of the house but 5.0.5 appears, and Bulldozer is sent into a PTSD stress episode, due to his Arkoudaphobia. The ghosts, Flug, and Demencia praise 5.0.5. On the way back home, Flug apologizes to 5.0.5., and they realize that they left Demencia behind, who plays games with the ghost kids. In a post-credits scene, a still-terrified Bulldozer is still roaming the forest, and eventually ends up in the cave where Grizzly, Panda, and Ice Bear of We Bare Bears are living.
3	3	"The VVV"; Transliteration: "LA VVV"	Ariadna "Ami" Guillén, Julto Villegas, Carlos Ramirez Bernal, Lucia Delgado Mixcoatl	October 29, 2021	May 23, 2023
Flug is woken up during the night by a woman named Adelita Guerrero, who wants to make a deal with Black Hat to defeat a wrestler named El Valiente by taking off his mask. Black Hat agrees and sends his employees to the arena. where El Valiente is wrestling a werewolf. Black Hat hacks into the video and audio system of the arena, threatening El Valiente. Demencia prepares to fight him and rips off his mask. It turns out that El Valiente is a man named Pedro and that their client is his wife. She explains the mask is actually a parasite who searches for great wrestlers. The mask takes control of Demencia and prepares to fight Dr. Flug. He is unsure he can win, but he later offers money to whoever can take off the mask from Demencia. This fails and he thinks he has no chance in defeating her. He gets badly beaten and she is declared the victor until Black Hat appears. He tells Demencia to take off the mask and she does with ease, surprising everyone in the arena. Black Hat throws the mask to Flug who contains it in a glass chamber, trapping it. Black Hat teleports Demencia, 5.0.5, and Flug to an abandoned plain, before leaving them there, and they talk back to their headquarters, having fun along the way. In a post-credits scene, the mask is begging Flug, Demencia, and 5.0.5. to let him out, as they are taking items out of the fridge to eat.
4	4	"Satellite Secrets"; Transliteration: "Secretos Satelitales"	Ariadna "Ami" Guillén, Carlos Ramirez Bernal, Lucia Delgado Mixcoatl, Julto Villegas, Ana Guerrero, Gerardo Oviedo Rodriguez and Alan Ituriel	October 29, 2021	May 23, 2023
A man speaks to a group of people about the threat faced by a sentient computer virus named V.I.R.U.S. and they agree that government hero Airlock can stop the threat. Back in the headquarters, Flug is testing new security measures and looking at his specimens. Flug prides himself on getting everything done and watches a morning broadcast, while 5.0.5. makes breakfast for him and Demencia. Black Hat summons them and mentions V.I.R.U.S. is their new client. He contracts them with backing up V.I.R.U.S.'s hard drives and defeating Airlock. They are transported to a space station where V.I.R.U.S.'s memory is stored, Flug is unsure he'll make it to his show in time while Demencia and 5.0.5. are excited about being on the station.. When they see Airlock is arriving, Demencia goes to stop her, while Flug goes to back up V.I.R.U.S.'s hard drives. Back on Earth, Black Hat is messing with several TV shows, using his powers. Airlock gets inside and faces Demencia who she thinks she's trapped, while the space station starts falling out of orbit. Flug gets to the control panel and starts backing up the V.I.R.U.S.'s data, but Airlock arrives and fights Flug, to destroy V.I.R.U.S.. With the help of 5.0.5. and Demencia, the hero is defeated. They get back to the headquarters and the virus interrupts a broadcast Flug was looking forward to, annoying him. In a post-credits scene, the hero is eaten by a space monster.
5	5	"BH's Bizzare Bad-Venture"; Transliteration: "La musculosa malventura de MBH"	Ariadna "Ami" Guillén, Ornella Antista, Carlos Ramirez Bernal, Lucia Delgado Mixcoatl and Alan Ituriel	October 29, 2021	May 23, 2023
A hero urges the citizens to remain calm. She is comforted by another hero, who is killed by one of Black Hat's machines. Flug wakes up suddenly, answering a question about one of their devices, while 5.0.5. draws and Demencia eats cereal. Flug determines that the hero was killed by an imposter, who challenges them to a duel. All three agree to meet this imposter, even if it is a trap. Their doppelgangers are on trial. They find a hideout that looks just like their home, surprising Demencia and the others. They are surprised by the other versions of themselves. When they see the other version of Black Hat, Demencia falls in love with it. This Black Hat tells his origin story and then leaves. The 5.0.5., Demencia, and Flug fight their doppelgangers. They get the upper hand when 5.0.5.'s flower makes the other Demencia sneeze, while Demencia defeats the other Flug by deflating him. This other Black Hat traps 5.0.5., Demencia, and Flug in a cage, while Flug tries to convince him that they are not rivals, while he leaves. They bring the doppelgangers back with them to headquarters. In a post-credit scene, their other doppelgangers are sentenced.
6	6	"The Heedeous Heart"; Transliteration: "El corazón cruel"	Ariadna "Ami" Guillén, Carlos Ramirez Bernal, Lucia Delgado Mixcoatl and Alan Ituriel	October 29, 2021	May 23, 2023
Two villains break into a museum and when one of them tries to call Black Hat, the one turns on them, with the remaining villain surrounded, and Heed giving him something that makes them love her. Back at headquarters, Flug tidies up his lab. He burns up his unpleasant materials and pulls out an old photo of him in his academy days, with Miss Heed as one of his classmates, and his thesis of studying human emotions. One of the villains goes to Black Hat and tasks Flug with chasing down Miss Heed, who is one of the heroes. They go the city where Miss Heed is staying, which is protected by heroes and villains. Demencia plays a video of Miss Heed on her phone, and they crash in the city. The other villain ends up being on Miss Heed's side, with 5.0.5., Demencia, and Flug surrounded. 5.0.5. sees she is the same in Flug's photo while Demencia and Flug fight the heroes and villains. Heed gets to Flug, causing him to defend her from Demencia. He carries off Heed, while 5.0.5. and Demencia escape, later arguing with each other. Demencia dreams about getting with Black Hat, marrying him, and leaving everyone else behind. She comes back to reality. Heed continues to have Flug under her spell, making a concoction of some kind for her. Demencia and 5.0.5. execute their plan to save Flug, with Demencia seeing that Heed is obsessed with getting more followers and make Golden Heart her friend. Flug snaps out of the spell and somehow escapes her room. Demencia beats him up a bit until he says that he isn't under the spell. Demencia captures the camera and gets it to stream live Heed confessing her love to Flug and kiss him, shocking her fans and Demencia. Demencia and 5.0.5. escape, while the heroes surround Heed, who came out a vat of some substance, and pleads for mercy. She is shown next in a prison of some kind, starting to lose her mind. Flug comes to visit her and she says she needs special attention. Flug listens and walks away, saying she needs to learn to love herself first. She pleads for him to return and he does not. A post-credits scene has a newscaster reporting on Flug and Heed kissing one another and how she got sent to a maximum security prison. Golden Heart sees this and is annoyed, asking Flug what he has done.

== Reception ==
The reception of the series has been relatively positive. In June 2017, Victor Pineda Trujillo said that the mini-shorts had "a touch of humor from the 90's cartoons," is about overcoming demons of your life, has wonderful artwork, and a great message. In 2019, E.M. Lee reviewed the show's pilot, noting the enormous fanbase of the series, said the pilot was worth waiting for, and argues that the episode is very creative, having "highly entertaining" characters, which have an interesting dynamic with each other. Lee also praised the animation and argued that it introduces the "core set pieces" of the series, giving the audience "enough to get them interested in the rest of the series." Other reviewers said that Villainous is suited for fans of The Grim Adventures of Billy & Mandy and Invader Zim while some said it gained online popularity for "lampooning popular Cartoon Network Shows." In March 2018, Catherine Lencione of Michigan Journal, a student publication of the University of Michigan–Dearborn, called the show unique and fun, with "colorful animation and character designs," saying it has the possibility of evolving "into something great."

== In other media ==
- Black Hat makes a cameo in the OK K.O.! Let's Be Heroes episode, "Crossover Nexus". Flug would later state in the Q&A special that an identical duplicate of Black Hat that was created in the short "Perception of Evil" was the character that appeared in the episode.
- The Black Hat Magisword, which debuted in the Villainous short, "The Lost Cases of Rhyboflavin", makes subsequent cameos in the second-season episodes of Mighty Magiswords, including "Ghosthaste".
- A crossover with Victor and Valentino entitled "Villainy In Monte Macabre" premiered on October 19, 2020, on the US Cartoon Network, with the cast reprising their roles, serving as a backdoor pilot for the Villainous television series. In the special, Victor and Valentino team up with Dr. Flug and Demencia to try to find a squid monster who is disguised as a human in Monte Macabre, unaware that the monster is the hero and they are the villains. The events of this crossover special take place during the second season of Victor and Valentino.
- Some characters have official Instagram accounts where their progress can be seen.
