= David Álvarez (artist) =

Puerto Rican comic book artist

David Álvarez (born 1976) is the creator of the comic strips Yenny and Kotto Kotorra, and is illustrator and storyboard artist for DC Comics, the Looney Tunes series, Disney and other companies.

== Early years ==
Álvarez was born in San Juan, Puerto Rico. As a child, he enjoyed drawing and by the time he was five years old, he would spend hours on end watching Disney Movies. He tried to draw the characters that he saw with unusual expressions on their faces. Álvarez received his primary and secondary education in his hometown.

== Yenny ==
Álvarez enrolled in the University of Puerto Rico after graduating from high school and continued to study art. In 1998, while still a student, he began to draw his first comic strip, Zacha and Anyelin, which was published in the local newspaper. He paid for his college expenses with the money earned. The comic strip eventually became known as "Yenny". Yenny is a beautiful girl with a pet iguana who wants to become a model; the only problem is that she has enormous feet. With the success of Yenny, Álvarez decided to self-publish a comic book called Changuy with David Martínez, about a Batman-like crow.

== Warner Bros. ==
Álvarez read in an animation magazine that Warner Bros. was making new projects, among them Space Jam. He sent samples of his work and after a year of waiting was finally contacted and began working for them as a freelance artist. The first story that he drew was an Animaniacs story and the second story was a Sylvester story called "Frankentweety".

Álvarez developed the idea of including cameos of obscure Looney Tunes characters within the storyboard panels. Among the people he has worked with and whom he considers his inspiration are Chuck Jones, Tex Avery and Bob Clampett. He also illustrated a short Chuck Jones tribute story written by Dan Slott.

On August 29, 2018, comics with DC villains with the Looney Tunes, which were illustrated by Álvarez, were released. In 2019, Alvarez disclosed that he was working as a character designer in Space Jam: A New Legacy, however, when the film was released in July 2021, Álvarez found that he was not credited, which led to controversy & spawned the trend #CreditAllArtists.

== Later years / The ChickenDuck Show / Changuy ==
David Álvarez plans on introducing and publishing his characters in the United States market. He also does freelance work for Disney and other companies. He currently lives in San Juan, Puerto Rico with his wife and child. David also freelanced storyboards for Cartoon Network's Mighty Magiswords created by Kyle Carrozza, whom he frequently collaborated with.

He also created the character ChickenDuck (based on a character from his strip Kee Kee Koki), made two shorts based on him (with Kyle Carrozza voicing ChickenDuck and other characters in the second short) and made an Indiegogo for a potential online series called "The ChickenDuck Show". A Kickstarter campaign was originally launched but was cancelled in favor for Indiegogo. The Indiegogo campaign did not meet its goal but David stated that storyboards for the series is still in the works, hinting that production is still being continued.

On June 20, 2019, David Álvarez launched a Kickstarter campaign for a Changuy origin issue entitled Rise of the Chango, which did not reach its initial goal of $3,000. Álvarez is also a character designer in the upcoming Snorks reboot

== See also ==
- List of Puerto Ricans
