= Christopher Crommett =

CNN's senior vice president in charge of CNN en Español

- Born: Christopher Scot Crommett; 21 July 1958 (age 68); Lewiston, Maine, U.S.
- Occupations: News management, music
- Known for: Co-Founder and former EVP/GM, CNN en Español
- Children: 2

Christopher Crommett (born July 21, 1958) was the head of CNN en Español, CNN's Spanish language division, from 2002 to 2009. Crommett has been a frequent speaker/presenter on news media and management matters, and consultant to businesses in the U.S. and Latin America. Crommett served as the consultant on the widely-cited documentary What the Hell Happened to Blood, Sweat & Tears? (2023), directed by John Scheinfeld.. Crommett is also a classically-trained singer (tenor), songwriter, composer, and producer.

== Early years ==
Crommett was born in Lewiston, Maine in 1958. When he was almost two years old, his family moved to Puerto Rico, where he was raised and received his primary and secondary education. His father, Eugene E. Crommett, was a professor at the University of Puerto Rico and a priest of the Episcopal Church. His mother, Martha W. Crommett, was an English teacher. Christopher gained early journalistic experience by writing for and editing his high school (Academia del Perpetuo Socorro) newspaper. He studied the trumpet and sang in various ensembles, including the professional chorus of Ópera de Puerto Rico.

In 1978, while enrolled at Haverford College, near Philadelphia, Pennsylvania, Crommett took a summer job at WOSO-AM, a bilingual radio station in San Juan. He subsequently took a one-year leave from college during which he worked at WOSO as an announcer, newscaster, reporter, and producer. In the summer of 1980, he covered both the Republican National Convention and Democratic National Convention for WOSO.

After graduating from Haverford in 1981, WOSO hired him as news director and host of a classical music program. He also frequently reported on major Puerto Rico news for the CBS Radio Network. In 1982–83, Crommett served for 12 months as press secretary to Puerto Rico's Resident Commissioner Baltasar Corrada del Río, in Washington, D.C., before returning to WOSO.

He later was the founding news anchor and assistant news director at WPRV-TV, Channel 13, the only English-language TV station in Puerto Rico at the time, before becoming news director for three years at all-news pioneer WKAQ-AM Radio Reloj.

== Family ==
In 1989, Crommett moved with his wife at the time, Ana, and daughter, Julie Ann, to the New York area to accept the position of news director at the Univision station, WXTV 41. He later served in a similar capacity at WADO-AM in New Jersey, where his son Michael was born.

== CNN ==
In 1990, Crommett joined CNN as a producer-writer, playing a key role in CNN's Spanish-language coverage of such global events as the Persian Gulf War. (At the time, CNN produced the evening newscast for the Telemundo network.) Crommett held various positions, including assignment manager and managing editor for Noticiero CNN Internacional. In 1998, he was promoted to the position of vice president and news director for the newly created CNN en Español 24/7 news network. In February 2002, he became the general manager of CNN en Español.

As head of CNN's Spanish-language division, Crommett directed all aspects, including newsgathering, editorial content, programming, production, operations, personnel, budget and finances, of the CNN en Español television network that reached 28 million pay TV households throughout the United States and Latin America. Select CNN en Español programming or content was also seen in Canada and Spain and distributed to numerous web and wireless clients.

Based in Atlanta, CNN en Español operates bureaus/production centers in Mexico, Washington and Buenos Aires, has its own news-gathering personnel in New York, Los Angeles, Miami and Jerusalem, and a worldwide network of more than 50 Spanish-speaking contributing journalists. Crommett also oversaw CNN en Español RADIO and served on the board of directors of CNN+, CNN en Español's sister channel in Spain.

Under Crommett's direction, CNN en Español personnel twice received the Alfred I. duPont-Columbia Award, in 2001 for Outstanding Investigative Reporting and again in 2006 for Coverage of the Tsunami Disaster. CNN en Español staff were also honored with two Peabody Awards and the Maria Moors Cabot Award, and garnered many prestigious awards in numerous Latin American countries including Mexico, Argentina, Venezuela, Colombia and Costa Rica.

== Personal life ==
Crommett is a lifetime member and former regional director of the National Association of Hispanic Journalists, and has earned several professional distinctions and multiple journalism awards.

He served for several years on the boards of the Atlanta Symphony Orchestra and of the nonprofit, HERO (Health & Education Relief Organization.

A singer (opera, musical theatre, zarzuela, standards), he performed frequently in the Atlanta, Georgia area, appearing with Atlanta Lyric Theatre and Capitol City Opera Company, among other ensembles.

In 2006, he produced the CD Butterflies in the Rain Forest/Music for Meditation & Celebration, consisting of music composed by Gerónimo Lluberas (1956–2003). In December 2010, he produced a second CD, Navidad de mi niñez, with 16 songs arranged by Gary Anderson, including traditional Puerto Rican Christmas "aguinaldos" or carols, universal favorites, and five songs which Crommett composed.

Crommett is the father of:

- Julie Ann Crommett, Equity and Inclusion Strategist (Disney, Google, NBC-Universal)
- Michael Crommett, Director of Photography/Cinematographer (Humans of New York: The Series; Koshien: Japan's Field of Dreams).

Crommett currently lives in Los Angeles.

== See also ==
- List of Puerto Ricans
