= Mike Kazaleh =

American animator and comic artist

- Area: Cartoonist
- Notable works: Teenage Mutant Ninja Turtles, The Simpsons, Futurama

Mike Kazaleh is an American animator and comic artist, and a one-time member of Rowrbrazzle from Detroit. His comic works include Ren and Stimpy, The Adventures of Captain Jack, Teenage Mutant Ninja Turtles Adventures and a number of other cartoon works.

== Career ==
Kazaleh entered the comics field through the underground comic Dope Comix at Kitchen Sink Press. Between 1986 and 1992, he worked on such Fantagraphics Books titles as The Adventures of Captain Jack, Anything Goes, Doomsday Squad, Usagi Yojimbo and Fontaine the Fox. In the early 1990s, he joined Archie Comics, where he did artwork on Teenage Mutant Ninja Turtles Adventures. He has also worked on such Marvel Comics titles as Mighty Mouse, Ren and Stimpy, and Tummy Trouble.

He has done work for DC Comics' "Johnny DC" all-ages line, including Camp Lazlo comics for the Cartoon Network Block Party, and an issue of Super Friends, a book based on Mattel's line of toddler-marketed action figure of the DC heroes.

In addition, Kazaleh is active in animation. He directed TV spots for Geoffrey & Jeffrey from 1983 to 1985, and then worked as an assistant animator at Filmation Associates. Other animation credits include Bakshi Animation, 20th Century Fox, and Warner Bros.

Kazaleh storyboarded episodes for Cartoon Network's Mighty Magiswords, working alongside Archie Comics' TMNT fan and creator of the show, Kyle Carrozza and the comics' artist Ken Mitchroney, who is the supervising director of the series.
