= Gary M. Anderson =

American musician

Gary Michael Anderson (born October 30, 1947) is an American musician.

He attended Berklee School of Music as a Down Beat Hall of Fame Scholarship recipient, and went on to graduate Summa Cum Laude. He served there as a full-time professor and a member of the Berklee Saxophone Quartet, received the institution's Outstanding Achievement Award, and has since been named one of Berklee's Fifty Outstanding Alumnus.

For five years, beginning in 1973, Anderson toured with Woody Herman's Thundering Herd as music director, playing saxophone and arranging. Anderson is credited on seven albums.

After leaving the Herman's band in 1978, Anderson settled in NYC where he composed, arranged, and orchestrated for television, films, and stage. Gary received numerous Daytime Emmy nominations for work with gameshows (Price Is Right, Matchgame, Family Feud, etc.) daytime dramas (One Life To Live, Guiding Light, All My Children, etc.) and animation (Mighty Mouse, Malcolm & Melvin, Hulk Hogan's Rock & Roll Wrestling, etc.). He received a Grammy award in music production for the 30th Anniversary of the Sesame Street soundtrack, "Elmopalooza" and a special Emmy in music production for The 1988 Goodwill Games. Anderson worked as an orchestrator on over 50 movies with composer Charles Gross as well as Broadway stage work with Marvin Hamlisch, Charles Strouse, Bob Fosse and mentor, Ralph Burns.

Recently re-located to Las Vegas, Nevada, Anderson continues his multi-faceted work and participates in summer jazz clinics around the country.
