= Kyle A. Carrozza =

American animator (born 1979)

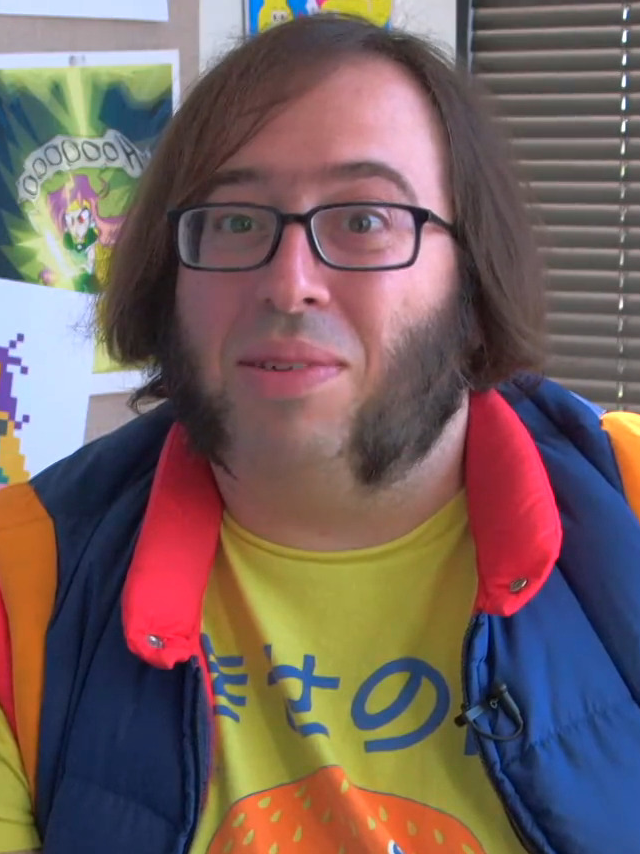
- Carrozza in 2015
- Born: Kyle Adam Carrozza; May 19, 1979 (age 47); Catskill, New York, U.S.
- Occupations: Animator; storyboard artist; screenwriter; voice actor; accordionist
- Years active: 1997–2024
- Known for: Mighty Magiswords
- Spouse: Lindsay Smith (m. 2014; sep. 2024)

Kyle Adam Carrozza (born May 19, 1979) is an American former animator, screenwriter, storyboard artist, musician and voice actor. He is best known as the creator of Cartoon Network's Mighty Magiswords (2015–2019) and the animated short MooBeard: The Cow Pirate for Nickelodeon's Random! Cartoons. Carrozza worked as a storyboard artist for Cartoon Network, Nickelodeon, Disney Channel, Disney Junior, and Apple TV+. As a musician, he composed and performed under the name TV's Kyle and was featured on Dr. Demento's radio show and The Funny Music Project. In June 2024, Carrozza was arrested on two counts of child pornography possession, effectively ending his career.

== Early life ==
Carrozza was born on May 19, 1979, in Catskill, New York. His father worked as a teacher for Catskill Middle School and as a photographer. He studied under cartoonist Brian Mitchell during the summertime. He graduated from Catskill High School in 1997 and in the Art Institute of Philadelphia in 1999.

== Career ==
=== Animation ===
Carrozza created Mighty Magiswords, which premiered in 2015 and was billed as Cartoon Network's first digital series made specifically for online. The shorts were later developed into a TV series which premiered on September 29, 2016. The characters in the series were created by Carrozza in 1996, and the project was first pitched to Cartoon Network in 2005–2006 (as Legendary Warriors for Hire), and to Mondo Media in 2007–2008 as Dungeons and Dayjobs, before Cartoon Network picked it up in 2013. The series concluded in 2019 with the remaining duration being released on Cartoon Network Video and Boomerang.

=== Music ===
Carrozza began producing music in the late 1990s, releasing most of his songs online under the name "TV's Kyle". His songs were played on the radio comedy show Dr. Demento and on the Funny Music Project.

== Personal life ==
Carrozza married Lindsay Smith, a character designer and voice actress, in 2014. She filed for divorce on August 16, 2024, two months after his arrest.

== Arrest ==
On June 20, 2024, Carrozza was arrested for possession on two counts of child pornography. Several former colleagues, such as Mighty Magiswords storyboard artist Luke Sienkowski (professionally known as Luke Ski), and The FuMP, announced their disassociation with him as a result. On their X accounts, Sienkowski stated "I will no longer be working with Kyle A. Carrozza" and that "Our animation podcast has been taken down by the network that was hosting it," in reference to the podcast Carrozza and Sienkowski ran for Otaku Generations entitled Kyle and Luke Talk About Toons, while The FuMP stated that "we have removed Kyle's listing from the Artists page and removed his songs from the random player at the bottom of the site. However, we are not going to delete his songs from the archive entirely. To do so would be to rewrite history and deny he was ever an important part of The FuMP." Meanwhile, Needlejuice Records, who collaborated with Carrozza on a successful Kickstarter campaign for his music, also announced their disassociation with him and have removed all his music from their roster.

== Influences ==
Carrozza cites the works of Bob Clampett, Jamie Hewlett, many Spümcø alumni (e.g. John Kricfalusi, Vincent Waller, Bob Camp, Jim Smith, Chris Reccardi, Nick Cross, Eddie Fitzgerald, Lynne Naylor, etc.), Ken Mitchroney, Bill Kopp, Doug TenNapel, Bruce Timm, and Jhonen Vasquez as his main inspirations. Carrozza was also heavily influenced by anime and tokusatsu shows (e.g. Super Sentai, Kamen Rider, etc.) and would frequently implant references to them in his works. Carrozza's music styling was influenced by the works of "Weird Al" Yankovic, They Might Be Giants and numerous artists, with the two former inspiring his use of the accordion in his works.

== Filmography ==
=== Film ===
Year	Title	Storyboard Artist	Notes
2011	God Bless America	No	Actor: American Superstarz Guitarist (uncredited)
2015	The SpongeBob Movie: Sponge Out of Water	No	Character layout artist
2024	The Casagrandes Movie	Yes	

=== Animation ===
Year	Title	Storyboard Artist	Writer	Notes
1997	Animaniacs	No	No	In-between animator and clean-up artist for "Bully for Skippy" (uncredited)
2005	Random! Cartoons	Yes	Yes	"MooBeard: The Cow Pirate"
2005–2006	Danger Rangers	Yes	No	Storyboard revisionist
2010–2012	Fanboy & Chum Chum	Yes	No	Storyboard revisionist and artist
2012	Fish Hooks	Yes	No	Storyboard artist
2013	Doc McStuffins	Yes	No	Flash animator for episode "Big Head Hallie", storyboard artist for "The Doc Files" shorts
2015–2019	Mighty Magiswords	Yes	Yes	Creator, showrunner, story, writer, voice actor, executive producer, storyboard artist, composer, theme songwriter, character design, background design, model designer
2017	Villainous	No	Yes	Writer
2020–2023	Animaniacs	Yes	Yes	Storyboard artist
2021–2023	The Snoopy Show	Yes	No	Storyboard artist
2024	The Fairly OddParents: A New Wish	Yes	No	Storyboard artist; uncredited on digital releases
2024	Camp Snoopy	Yes	No	Storyboard artist (season 1)

=== Web series ===
Year	Title	Role
2012	Bravest Warriors	Storyboard artist: "CatBug"
2021	Wha Cha Got?	Storyboard artist: "Spatula"
2023–2024	Well ABRIDGE Me, Princess!	Theme songwriter, composer, voice actor, voice director

=== Video games ===
Year	Title	Role
1999	JumpStart Explorers	Character designer, animator and voice
1999	JumpStart Around the World	Voice
2000	JumpStart Adventure Challenge	Character designer
2007	Ratatouille	Tester
2007	ABCmouse	Character designer and graphic designer

=== Voice roles ===
Year	Title	Voice role
1999	JumpStart Explorers	Additional voices
1999	JumpStart Around the World	Brady Bear
2008	Random! Cartoons	Ungus the Unpleasant / Ungentlemanly Pig (MooBeard: The Cow Pirate)
2015–2019	Mighty Magiswords	Prohyas / Announcer / Grup the Dragon / Additional Voices
2018	The Powerpuff Girls	Harmadillo
2023	SCOOP D'ÉTAT	Sun
2023–2024	Well ABRIDGE Me, Princess!	Castellaneta Moblin / Simon Belmont / Additional Voices
2024	The Fairly OddParents: A New Wish	Pe-Az No. 1 / Pe-Az No. 2 / Pe-Az No. 3 (original broadcast/release only)
