= Mighty Magiswords =

American animated television and web series

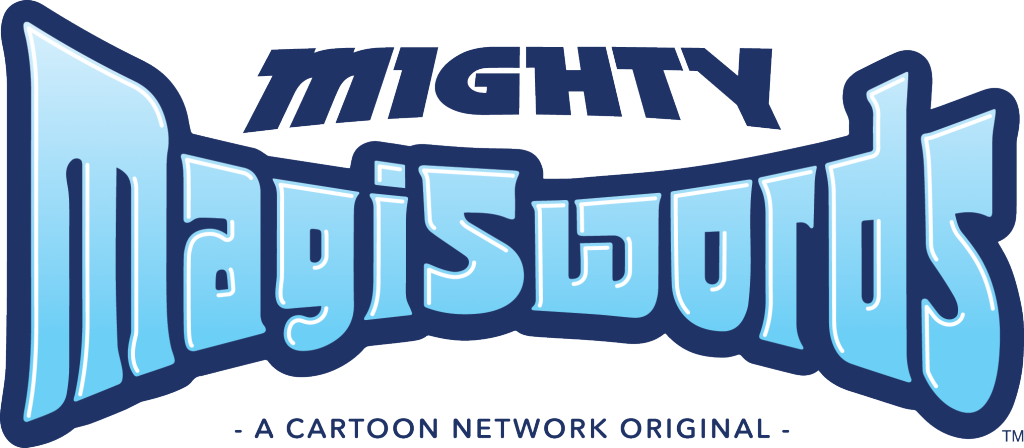
- Genre: Action; Adventure; Comedy; Fantasy
- Created by: Kyle A. Carrozza
- Directed by: Nick Bertonazzi Jr. (animation)
- Voices of: Kyle A. Carrozza; Grey Griffin
- Theme music composer: Andy Paley; Kyle A. Carrozza
- Opening theme: "Mighty Magiswords", performed by Dan Avidan and Kyle A. Carrozza
- Composers: Andy Paley; Jake Posner; Kyle A. Carrozza
- Country of origin: United States
- Original language: English
- No. of seasons: 2; 3 (web series)
- No. of episodes: 92 (list of episodes)

Production
- Executive producers: Kyle A. Carrozza; Tramm Wigzell; Jennifer Pelphrey; Brian A. Miller; Rob Sorcher
- Producer: Brent Tanner
- Editor: Tom Browngardt
- Running time: 11 minutes (TV series); 3–5 minutes (webisodes)
- Production company: Cartoon Network Studios

Original release
- Network: Cartoon Network Video
- Release: May 6, 2015 – June 30, 2017
- Network: Cartoon Network
- Release: September 29, 2016 – May 17, 2019

Mighty Magiswords (stylized as Mighty MagiSwords) is an American animated web and television series created by Kyle A. Carrozza for Cartoon Network Video as the network's first original web series. The webisodes officially premiered online on May 6, 2015, along with interactive games on the app Cartoon Network Anything.

On June 13, 2016, it was confirmed that Mighty Magiswords had been picked up as a full-length television series, which premiered on Cartoon Network on September 29, 2016. A sneak peek of the episode "Mushroom Menace" aired on September 5, 2016, prior to the official premiere date. On February 9, 2017, Mighty Magiswords was renewed for a second season, which premiered on April 30, 2018, along with the release of a new mobile game, Surely You Quest, in addition to the previous mobile game, MagiMobile.

The series ended on May 17, 2019, with the remaining episodes, which had been released on the Cartoon Network Video app around a year earlier, premiering simultaneously on Cartoon Network and Boomerang for two weeks. The series was available on HBO Max until August 2022, when it was removed.

== Premise ==
The series follows Prohyas Robert Warrior and Vambre Marie Warrior, siblings and "Warriors for Hire" who go on adventures and quests around the world in search of magical swords called Magiswords.

=== Magiswords ===
Magiswords are swords that have a specific magical ability based on their design. There are many Magiswords scattered throughout the land, which Vambre and Prohyas search for while using Magiswords they have previously obtained. Some Magiswords can be bought at the Mount Ma'all at Ralpho's House of Swords, while others can be found in certain areas of the Rhyboflaven Kingdom. Sometimes, the full potential of the Magiswords must be unlocked through Prohyas and Vambre's combined efforts. Some Magiswords are living beings, such as the Zombie Pumpkin Magisword, the Dolphin Magisword, and the Carnivorous Plant Magisword.

== Cast ==
- Kyle A. Carrozza – Prohyas, Announcer, Old Man Oldman, Zombie Pumpkin Magisword, Grup the Dragon, Nohyas, Robopiggeh, Goomer, Frankylo, The Underground Hand Beast, Attacktus, Prug, Monkey Chunks, Biblia Tick
- Grey Griffin – Vambre, Princess Zange, The Mysterious Hooded Woman, Füd
- Eric Bauza – Hoppus, Phil, King Rexxtopher
- Mr. Lawrence – Ralphio, Jest-O, Loch Mess Monster, Dinosaur
- Phil LaMarr – Noville, Long James, Sidney
- Billy West – Herman, Pterodactyl, Spiffy the Sphinx
- Candi Milo – Morbidia ("Too Many Warriors" only), Vambre's Brain, Dolphin Magisword (sneezes only)
- Rob Paulsen – Professor Cyrus, Enchanted Tree, Singing Snowman, Mr. Tundrala, Weather Gnome, Tentacle Monster
- Hal Lublin – Omnibus, Smashroom, Ice Posey, Pirates (01, 08), Shopkeeper

== Episodes ==
Season	Episodes	Originally released	
Season	Episodes	First released	Last released
Pilot		August 15, 2016	
1	52	September 29, 2016	April 29, 2018
2	40	April 30, 2018	May 17, 2019

== Background and production ==
Mighty Magiswords was created by Kyle Carrozza, an animator, voice actor, musician, and storyboard artist who, at the time, wrote songs for The FuMP and was previously creator, storyboard artist and voice actor for his short MooBeard: The Cow Pirate, which aired as part of the Nicktoons Network series Random! Cartoons. Produced in Flash animation, Mighty Magiswords was the first original cartoon on Cartoon Network made specifically for online since Web Premiere Toons. The series' characters were created by Carrozza in 1996, with the series being pitched to Cartoon Network in 2005–2006 as "Legendary Warriors for Hire" and to Mondo Media in 2007–2008 as "Dungeons and Dayjobs", before being picked up by Cartoon Network in 2013. Most of the series was animated in-house at Cartoon Network Studios, who also did animation revisions, interstitials, and additional content. The original shorts were animated by their newly established Flash unit, while overseas mid-production was done at Malaysian animation studio Inspidea. Production for the series wrapped in 2018, with the remaining episodes being released simultaneously from May 6 to May 17, 2019.

== Broadcast ==
The Mighty Magiswords short-form series premiered on Cartoon Network in Australia and New Zealand on January 16, 2016. Cartoon Network Australia aired a sneak peek premiere of the full-length series on December 10, 2016. Mighty Magiswords premiered as a full series in Australia on January 16, 2017.

Mighty Magiswords premiered on Cartoon Network in the United States on September 29, 2016, and aired re-runs on its sister channel Boomerang from May 29, 2018, to June 8, 2018, then returned to the network's schedule on April 29, 2019. Mighty Magiswords fully premiered on Cartoon Network UK on April 8, 2017, and aired on CITV on April 6, 2018.

On Cartoon Network Africa, the web series premiered in January 2017, and the show fully premiered in March 2017. The series also premiered in India on May 6, 2017.

== Reception ==
Emily Ashby of Common Sense Media wrote, "...Short on substance or value. Kids may not learn much from watching, but they'll undoubtedly enjoy the characters' antics and the laughable mayhem that ensues when each new magisword gets put to use."
