= 2026 in Misfits Boxing and MF Pro =

MF Sports
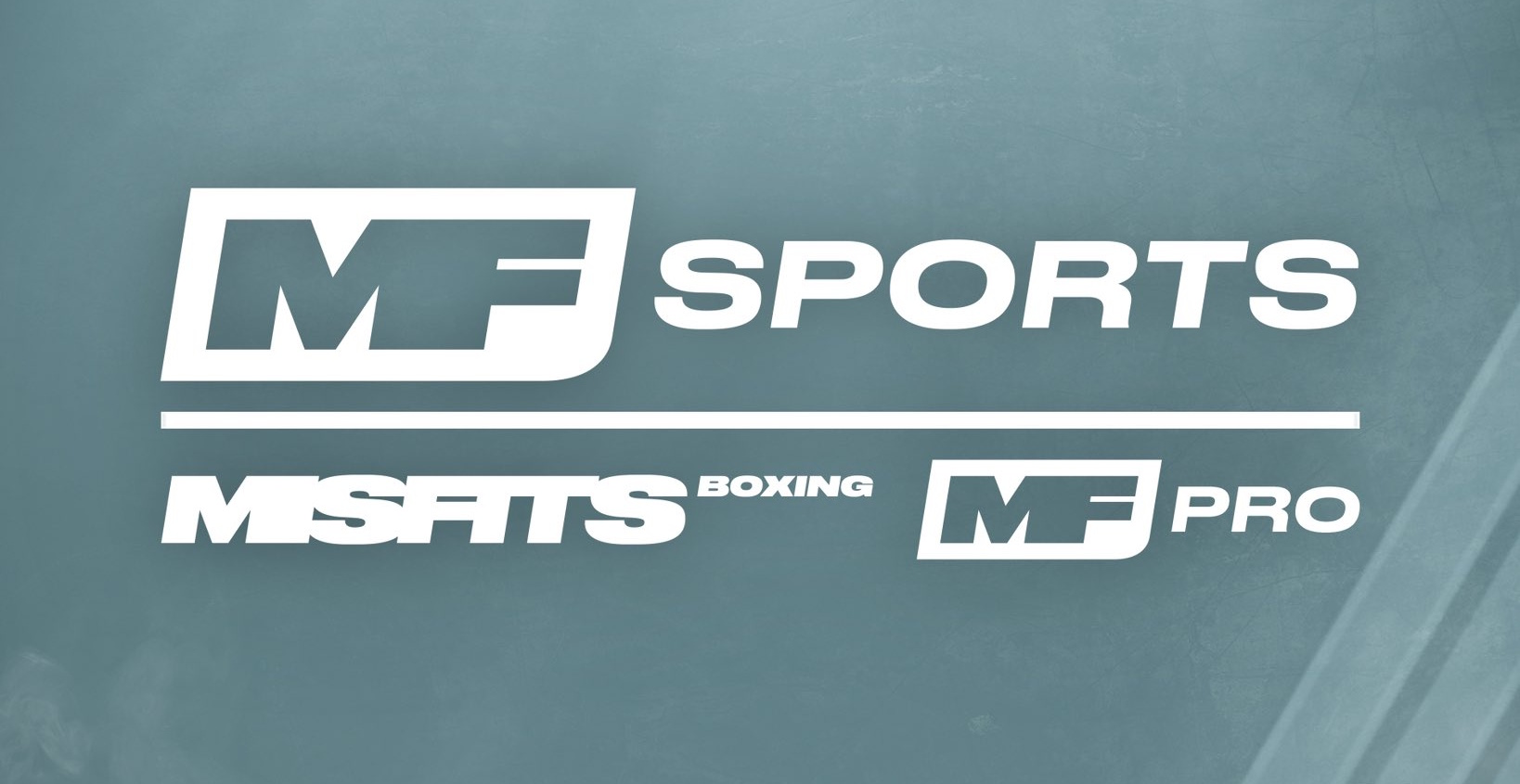

Information
- Promotion: Misfits Boxing; MF Pro
- First date: 7 March 2026
- Last date: December 2026
- Last date aired: 14 November 2026
- Website: misfitsboxing.com

Events
- Total events: 12

Fights
- Total fights: 116
- Title fights: 26

2026 in Misfits Boxing and MF Pro is the fifth year in the history of Misfits Boxing and first year in the history for MF Pro, two boxing promotions founded by English YouTuber KSI and run by Mams Taylor, Kalle Sauerland, and Nisse Sauerland.

2026 sees the debut of MF Sports professional boxing division 'MF Pro.'

== MF Duel 2 ==
MF Duel 2
- Date: 7 March 2026
- Venue: Vaillant Live, Derby, England
- Title on the line: MF Pro light heavyweight title

Tale of the tape
Boxer	Ty Mitchell	Gabriel Rosado
Nickname	"The Derby Banger"	"King"
Hometown	Derby, England	Philadelphia, Pennsylvania, US
Pre-fight record	6–2 (4 KOs) (Note: On BoxRec, Mitchell's professional record is 5–2 (3 KOs) and his MF–professional record is 1–0 (1 KO).)	28–17–1 (16 KOs)
Height	6 ft 4 in (193 cm)	5 ft 11½ in
Weight	171.4 lb (78 kg)	172.4 lb (78 kg)
Style	Southpaw	Orthodox

Result
- Mitchell defeated Rosado via Unanimous Decision. (59–55 Mitchell, 59–55 Mitchell, 59–55 Mitchell)

MF Duel 2: Mitchell vs. Rosado was an MF–professional boxing event which featured Ty Mitchell vs. Gabriel Rosado, a light heavyweight match contested between professional boxers Ty Mitchell and Gabriel Rosado for the MF Pro light heavyweight title. The event took place on 7 March 2026 at the Vaillant Live in Derby, England. Mitchell defeated Rosado via unanimous decision.

=== Background ===
On 12 February 2026, Misfits Boxing announced their first event for 2026 with a second entry in their "MF Duel" series where Ty Mitchell will be defending his MF Pro light heavyweight title against Gabriel Rosado.

The undercard features the boxing debut of two-time Olympic gold medallist Jade Jones.

=== Card ===
Weight class		vs		Method	Round	Time	Notes
Light heavyweight	Ty Mitchell (c)	def.	Gabriel Rosado	UD	6		^{Note 1}
Lightweight	Walid Sharks	def.	Argentinian King	KO	2/4	1:05
Middleweight	Pearl Gonzalez (c)	def.	Carla Jade	UD	5		^{Note 2}
Heavyweight	Jordan Banjo	def.	Tempo Arts	TKO	4/4	2:54
Lightweight	Jade Jones	def.	Egypt Criss	KO	2/4	0:59
Heavyweight	Wil Anderson	def.	Jake Cornish	TKO	3/4	0:46
Welterweight	Justin Ibarrola	def.	James Springer	TKO	4/4	2:46

^Note 1 For MF Pro light heavyweight title
^Note 2 For MFB women's middleweight title

== Conlan vs. Walsh ==
Conlan vs. Walsh
- Date: 20 March 2026
- Venue: SSE Arena, Belfast, Northern Ireland
- Title on the line: WBC international featherweight title

Tale of the tape
Boxer	Mick Conlan	Kevin Walsh
Nickname	"Irish"	"King"
Hometown	Belfast, Northern Ireland	Brockton, Massachusetts, US
Pre-fight record	20–3 (10 KOs)	19–0 (10 KOs)
Height	5 ft 8 in (173 cm)	5 ft 7 in (170 cm)
Weight	126.0 lb (57 kg)	125.5 lb (57 kg)
Style	Orthodox	Orthodox

Result
- Walsh defeated Conlan via Split Decision. (97–93 Conlan, 94–96 Walsh, 94–96 Walsh)

Mick Conlan vs. Kevin Walsh was a featherweight professional boxing match contested between Mick Conlan and Kevin Walsh for the WBC international featherweight title. The bout took place on 20 March 2026 at the SSE Arena in Belfast, Northern Ireland. Walsh defeated Conlan via split decision.

=== Background ===
On 6 February 2026, Mick Conlan's return to the ring was confirmed for 20 March as the inaugural event for the newly established MF Pro, the professional boxing division of Misfits Boxing. Conlan is set to defeated his WBC international featherweight title against American boxer Kevin Walsh at the SSE Arena in his hometown Belfast, Northern Ireland.

=== Card ===
Weight class		vs		Method	Round	Time	Notes
Postliminary Card
Super welterweight	Glenn Bryne	def.	Daniel Przewieslik	UD	6
Super featherweight	Sam Norris	def.	Stefan Vincent	PTS	4
Main Card
Featherweight	Kevin Walsh	def.	Mick Conlan (c)	SD	10		^{Note 1}
Welterweight	Kieran Molloy	def.	Xavier Kohlen	UD	10		^{Note 2}
Super middleweight	Niall Brown	def.	Darren Johnstone	TKO	3/10	0:44	^{Note 3}
Super featherweight	Codie Smith	def.	Lee Gormley	TKO	1/8	1:54
Super welterweight	Jak Corrie	def.	Jacob Quinn	KO	2/6	2:38
Preliminary Card
Super lightweight	Ben Marksby	def.	Carlos Daniel Cordoba	RTD	4/8	3:00
Lightweight	Kurt Walker	def.	Yahir Morales	PTS	4/4
Super featherweight	Kyle Smith	def.	Eduardo Vera Sanchez	PTS	4/4

^Note 1 For WBC international featherweight title
^Note 2 For vacant IBF European welterweight title
^Note 3 Eliminator for British super middleweight title

== Chisora vs. Wilder: An Icon Will Fall ==
Derek Chisora vs. Deontay Wilder, billed as An Icon Will Fall, was a heavyweight professional boxing match contested between Derek Chisora and former WBC heavyweight champion Deontay Wilder. The bout took place on 4 April 2026 at The O2 Arena in London, England. Wilder defeated Chisora via split decision.

== Edwards vs. Nqothole: Brawl Hall ==
Brawl Hall
- Date: 29 May 2026
- Venue: York Hall, London, England

Tale of the tape
Boxer	Charlie Edwards	Sikho Nqothole
Nickname		"Sequence"
Hometown	London, England	Mthatha, South Africa
Pre-fight record	20–2–0–1 (7 KOs)	21–3 (13 KOs)
Height	5 ft 6 in (168 cm)	6 ft 1 in (185 cm)
Weight	114.8 lb (52 kg)	114.5 lb (52 kg)
Style	Orthodox	Orthodox

Result
- Nqothole defeated Edwards via Unanimous Decision. (113–116 Nqothole, 112–117 Nqothole, 111–118 Nqothole)

Charlie Edwards vs. Sikho Nqothole, billed as Brawl Hall, was a super flyweight professional boxing match contested between Charlie Edwards and Sikho Nqothole as the IBF World super flyweight title eliminator. The bout took place on 29 May 2026 at the York Hall in London, England. Nqothole defeated Edwards via unanimous decision.

=== Background ===
In early March 2026, Charlie Edwards was ordered to face Sikho Nqothole as the IBF eliminator after Nqothole's original opponent, Ricardo Malajika, withdrew in their bout. In April, MF Pro announced the bout as the headliner for "Brawl Hall", their third event which features four different title bouts taking place on 19 May at the York Hall.

=== Card ===
Weight class		vs		Method	Round	Time	Notes
Main Card
Super flyweight	Sikho Nqothole	def.	Charlie Edwards	UD	12		^{Note 1}
Super welterweight	Dan Toward	vs.	Jak Corrie	SD	10		^{Note 2}
Super middleweight	Ollie Cooper	def.	James Osborne	TKO	8/10	2:58	^{Note 3}
Featherweight	Tom Welland	def.	Saleh Kassim	UD	10		^{Note 4}
Cruiserweight	Lucas Roehrig	def.	Faton Tolaj	TKO	2/8	1:25
Preliminary Card
Middleweight	Jonathan Kumuteo	def.	Jose Aguirre	PTS	4
Middleweight	Sultan Babakhanov	def.	Luis Enrique Montelongo Morales	PTS	6
Welterweight	Eugene Mckeever	def.	Artem Liashevych	PTS	4

^Note 1 IBF World super flyweight title eliminator
^Note 2 For vacant WBA Continental super welterweight title
^Note 3 For vacant English super middleweight title
^Note 4 For vacant Commonwealth Youth featherweight title

== Fame Fighting vs. Misfits Boxing ==
Fame Fighting vs. Misfits Boxing
- Date: 6 June 2026
- Venue: Ostermann-Arena, Leverkusen, Germany

Tale of the tape
Boxer	Aleks Petrović	Chase DeMoor
Nickname		"The GOAT"
Hometown	Mülheim, Germany	Eatonville, Washington, U.S.
Pre-fight record	2–1	13–3–1 (10 KOs) (Note: On BoxRec, DeMoor's professional record is 8–2–1 (8 KOs) and his MF-professional record is 5–1 (2 KO).)
Height	6 ft 1 in (185 cm)	6 ft 3 in (191 cm)
Weight	229.5 lb (104 kg)	244.9 lb (111 kg)
Style	Orthodox	Orthodox
Recognition	FF Super Heavyweight Champion	MFB Heavyweight Champion

Result
- DeMoor defeated Petrović via Unanimous Decision.

Fame Fighting vs. Misfits Boxing, billed as The Big Crossover, was an exhibition boxing event featuring Aleks Petrović vs. Chase DeMoor, a super heavyweight match contested between FF super heavyweight champion Aleks Petrović and MFB heavyweight champion Chase DeMoor. The event took place on 6 June 2026 at Ostermann-Arena in Leverkusen, Germany. DeMoor defeated Petrović via unanimous decision.

The event ended in a 4–4 draw, with four Misfits fighters and four Fame fighters winning respectively.

=== Background ===
On 30 April 2026, president of Fame Fighting Eugen Lopez, announced that Fame Fighting and Misfits Boxing will co-promote an event for 6 June at the Ostermann-Arena in Leverkusen, billed as a promotion vs promotion. The event will be broadcast via Bild in Germany, Austria, and Switzerland. The next day, Fame Fighting announced that their super heavyweight champion Aleks Petrović will headline against Misfits Boxing's heavyweight champion Chase DeMoor.

=== Card ===
(Note: Fighters labled FF represents Fame Fighting, and fighters labled MF represent Misfits Boxing.)

Weight class		vs		Method	Round	Time	Notes
Main Card (Bild+ and The Sun Club)
Super heavyweight	Chase DeMoor (MF)	def.	Aleks Petrović (FF)	UD	6
Super middleweight	Can Kaplan (FF)	def.	Slim Albaher (MF)	TKO	5/5	2:05	^{Note 1}
Light heavyweight	Ediz Tasci (FF)	def.	Dad (MF)	TKO	1/4	2:20
Heavyweight	Temperrr (MF)	def.	MckyTV (FF)	UD	3
Cruiserweight	Tommy Pedroni (FF)	def.	Fes Batista (MF)	TKO	3/4	1:10
Light heavyweight	Oliver Ginkel	def.	Norbert Ruzicka	KO	5/6	0:26	^{Note 2}
Super middleweight	Ty Mitchell (MF)	def.	Aro Schwartz (FF)	KO	1/8	2:39	^{Note 3}
Heavyweight	Josh Brueckner (MF)	def.	Tobias Pietrek (FF)	TKO	1/4	1:44
Light heavyweight	Filip Pavlović (FF)	def.	Luis Alcaraz Pineda (MF)	UD	4
Preliminary Card (YouTube and The Sun)
Lightweight	FoxTheG	def.	Pully Arif	UD	4

^Note 1 Professional bout
^Note 2 Professional bout
^Note 3 Professional bout

== Misfits 23 – Beauty vs. The Beast ==
Beauty vs. The Beast
- Date: 13 June 2026
- Venue: Manchester Arena, Manchester, England

Tale of the tape
Boxer	Tommy Fury	Eddie Hall
Nickname	"TNT"	"The Beast"
Hometown	Manchester, England	Newcastle-under-Lyme, England
Pre-fight record	11–0 (4 KOs)	0–1
Height	6 ft 1 in (185 cm)	6 ft 3 in (191 cm)
Weight	217.5 lb (99 kg)	325.6 lb (148 kg)
Style	Orthodox	Orthodox
Recognition		2017 World's Strongest Man; Former Deadlift World Record holder 500 kg (1,102 lb)

Result
- Bout ended (58–56 Fury (Note: Scored by Tony Bellew), 59–56 Fury (Note: Scored by Dereck Chisora), 57–57 (Note: Scored by Chase DeMoor)) in favour of Fury.

Misfits 23 – Beauty vs. The Beast was an MF–professional boxing event featuring Tommy Fury vs. Eddie Hall, an exhibition heavyweight match contested between professional boxer Tommy Fury and former strongman competitor Eddie Hall. The event took place on 13 June 2026 at Manchester Arena in Manchester, England.

The bout ended with a score of (58–56, 59–56, 57–57) in favour of Fury, though no winner was officially announced on the night.

=== Background ===
In February 2026, Misfits co-president Mams Taylor revealed that Misfits 23 was originally scheduled to take place in April in Qatar, but due to the 2026 Iran war, the event was postponed and eventually cancelled. On 25 March, Manchester Arena's social media account accidentally posted a filer promoting a bout between Tommy Fury and Eddie Hall set for 13 June. Later that day, Talksport confirmed the bout and stated an announcement for Misfits 23 was imminent in the coming days. On 27 March, Misfits Boxing formally announced the bout on social media with the billing "Beauty vs. The Beast", referencing the classic fairy tale Beauty and the Beast.

The launch press conference took place on 10 April at the Glaziers Hall in London. During the presser, Hall confirmed the bout will be six two minute rounds with 12 oz gloves. The undercard was announced on 24 April which features the return of two-time Olympic gold medallist Jade Jones.

During the co-feature bout between Anthony Taylor and Matt Floyd, Taylor began to complain that he cannot see, began hitting the ground in frustration. The referee waved off the bout and called it a no contest, which resulted in Taylor charging towards Floyd. Taylor accused Floyd of using Tiger Balm, which resulted in the burning sensation in his eyes. Mams Taylor confirmed an investigation is underway with the commission. On 18 June, the World Combat Sports Federation notified Misfits that there was no foul play, there by overturning the no contest to a disqualification victory to Floyd.

=== Card ===
Weight class		vs		Method	Round	Time	Notes
Main Card (PPV)
Heavyweight	Tommy Fury	def.	Eddie Hall	MD	6		^{Note 1}
Light heavyweight	Matt Floyd	def.	Anthony Taylor (c)	DQ	5/6	0:58	^{Note 2}
Heavyweight	Armz Korleone	def.	Big Stacks	TKO	4/4	1:50
Light heavyweight	Ibiza Final Boss	def.	Jordan McCann	MD	4
Cruiserweight	Jade Jones	def.	FederiKita	TKO	2/4	0:59
Middleweight	Swarmz	def.	Biel	TKO	2/3	1:48
Light heavyweight	Adam Brooks	def.	Rahim Pardesi	UD	4
Cruiserweight	Sheena Bathory	def.	Tina Snows	TKO	1/4	1:09
Preliminary Card
Light heavyweight	Khallas Karim	def.	Luke Nevin	UD	4
Middleweight	Little Bellsy	def.	The CrAsian	UD	4

^Note 1 Exhibition bout; No winner officially declared, though unofficial scorecard read (58–56, 59–56, 57–57) in favour of Fury.
^Note 2 For MFB light heavyweight title

== Sylve vs. Diaz: Pugilist Revolution ==
Pugilist Revolution
- Date: 19 June 2026
- Venue: Thunder Studios, Long Beach, California, US

Tale of the tape
Boxer	Ashton Sylve	Joseph Diaz
Nickname	"H2O"	"JoJo"
Hometown	Long Beach, California, US	South El Monte, California, US
Pre-fight record	13–1 (10 KOs)	34–9–1 (15 KOs)
Height	5 ft 8 in (173 cm)	5 ft 6 in (168 cm)
Weight	140.0 lb (64 kg)	139.5 lb (63 kg)
Style	Orthodox	Orthodox
Recognition		Former IBF Super Lightweight Champion

Result
- Sylve defeated Diaz via Unanimous Decision. (97–93 Sylve, 98–92 Sylve, 97-93 Sylve)

Ashton Sylve vs. Joseph Diaz, billed as Pugilist Revolution, was a welterweight professional boxing match contested between Ashton Sylve and Joseph Diaz. The bout took place on 19 June 2026 at Thunder Studios in Long Beach, California, US. Sylve defeated Diaz via unanimous decision.

=== Background ===
On 15 May 2026, MF Pro announced their inaugural United States event will take place on 19 June in Long Beach, California with Ashton Sylve vs. Joseph Diaz as the headline.

=== Card ===
Weight class		vs		Method	Round	Time	Notes
Postliminary Card
Bantamweight	Kevin Gudino	def.	Alejandro Herrera	KO	1/4	1:10
Middleweight	Daniel Mercado	def.	Alejandro Medina de la Rosa	KO	1/4	1:47	^{Note 1}
Super middleweight	Ethan Smith	def.	Jose Adolfo Madrigal Rodriguez	KO	1/6	1:11
Main Card
Welterweight	Ashton Sylve	def.	Joseph Diaz	UD	10
Super lightweight	Devin Cushing	def.	J'Hon Ingram	UD	10
Middleweight	Amir Anderson	def.	Jonas Sylvain	UD	10		^{Note 2}
Super lightweight	Ernesto Mercado	def.	Juan Carlos Burgos	KO	2/10	2:40	^{Note 3}
Super lightweight	David Lopez	def.	Joey Borrero	TKO	1/8	1:41
Super flyweight	Kayla Gomez	def.	Shayntain Creer	UD	4		^{Note 4}

^Note 1 Mercado's professional debut
^Note 2 For vacant WBC US Silver middleweight title
^Note 3 For WBO International super lightweight title
^Note 4 Gomez and Creer's professional debut

== Eubank vs. Papot ==
Eubank vs. Papot
- Date: 18 July 2026
- Venue: Copper Box Arena, London, England
- Title on the line: vacant IBF International welterweight title

Tale of the tape
Boxer	Harlem Eubank	David Papot
Nickname	"Humble"	L'enfant de Penhoet ("The Child of Penhoet")
Hometown	Brighton, England	Saint-Nazaire, France
Pre-fight record	22–1 (9 KOs)	30–1–1 (5 KOs)
Height	5 ft 8 in (173 cm)	5 ft 8 in (173 cm)
Weight	146.3 lb (66 kg)	147.0 lb (67 kg)
Style	Orthodox	Southpaw
Recognition	Former IBF Inter-Continental Welterweight Champion	Former IBF World Super Welterweight Champion

Result
- Papot defeated Eubank via Unanimous Decision. (110–115 Papot, 111–113 Papot, 109–115 Papot)

Harlem Eubank vs. David Papot, was a welterweight professional boxing match contested between Harlem Eubank and David Papot. The bout took place onon 18 July 2026 at the Copper Box Arena in London, England. Papot defeated Eubank via unanimous decision.

=== Background ===
On 29 May 2026 during the broadcast of Edwards vs. Nqothole, MF Pro announced Harlem Eubank would face David Papot on 18 July.

=== Card ===
Weight class		vs		Method	Round	Time	Notes
Postliminary Card
Middleweight	Joel Bartell	vs.	Kyran Jones	SD	10
Featherweight	Christian Fetti	def.	Kurtis Wiggins	MD	8
Main Card
Welterweight	David Papot	def.	Harlem Eubank	UD	12		^{Note 1}
Super featherweight	Codie Smith	def.	Ryan Griffiths	PTS	8
Welterweight	Kieran Molloy	def.	Sean Noakes	TKO	8/10	1:58	^{Note 2}
Preliminary Card
Super lightweight	Aaron Prospere	def.	Mikey Sakyi	UD	10		^{Note 3}
Heavyweight	Matty Harris	def.	Ben Vickers	PTS	6
Welterweight	Jake Henty	def.	Finley James	PTS	10		^{Note 4}
Featherweight	JP O'Meara	def.	Cesar Ignacio Paredes	PTS	6
Featherweight	Jay Pitman	def.	Enzo Bahiaho Muñoz	PTS	6
Welterweight	Jamie Barrett	def.	Stefan Vincent	TKO	1/4	2:27

^Note 1 For vacant IBF International welterweight title
^Note 2 For IBF European welterweight title
^Note 3 For vacant British super lightweight title
^Note 4 For vacant British Southern Area welterweight title

== McCann vs. Stacks ==
McCann vs. Stacks
- Date: 12 September 2026
- Venue: Newcastle Arena, Newcastle upon Tyne, England

Tale of the tape
Boxer	Jordan McCann	Big Stacks
Hometown	Salford, England	Essex, England
Pre-fight record	0–1	0–1
Weight	251.2 lb (114 kg)	246.4 lb (112 kg)
Style	Orthodox	Orthodox

Result
- Stacks defeated McCann via round 2 TKO.

Jordan McCann vs. Big Stacks was a heavyweight MF–professional boxing event contested between influencers Jordan McCann and Big Stacks. The event took place on 12 September 2026 at Newcastle Arena in Newcastle upon Tyne, England. Stacks defeated McCann via technical knockout in the second round.

=== Background ===
During the public workout for Misfits 23 – Beauty vs. The Beast, influencer Big Stacks reportedly got into an argument with Shane Fury, the brother of Tyson Fury. During the confrontation, Jordan McCann put Stacks in a headlock and punched him in the face. This altercation resulted in Stacks having a damaged mouth, and nearly collapsed his bout with Armz Korleone. Korleone was reportedly offered Chase DeMoor, Kelz, and Lezra Gomez, but the bout was restored under the ruleset of body shots only.

On 25 June, Misfits announced that McCann and Stacks would face each other in a headline bout on 12 September at Newcastle Arena in Newcastle upon Tyne.

=== Card ===
Weight class		vs		Method	Round	Time	Notes
Heavyweight	Big Stacks	def.	Jordan McCann	TKO	2/4	0:51	^{Note 1}
Super middleweight	Jade Jones	def.	Sheena Bathory	RTD	4/5	2:00	^{Note 2}
Super middleweight	Harley Benn	def.	Joe Laws	DQ	1/5	0:49
Heavyweight	Ibiza Final Boss	def.	Kellen Jenkins	SD	4		^{Note 3}
Lightweight	Nitboy	def.	Kane West	UD	3		^{Note 4}
Super middleweight	Ashley Rak-Su	def.	Warren Spencer	SD	5
Heavyweight	Armz Korleone	def.	Kelz	MD	4		^{Note 5}
Heavyweight	Matty Scott	def.	Grant Mallinson	UD	5		^{Note 6}, ^{7}
Cruiserweight	Wil Anderson	def.	Luke Dyson	TKO	4/4	1:46
Featherweight	Amelia Hewitt	def.	Kimbo Bimbo	TKO	3/3	1:29

^Note 1 Two minute rounds
^Note 2 For inaugural MFB women's super middleweight title
^Note 3 Two minute rounds
^Note 4 Two minute rounds
^Note 5 Two minute rounds
^Note 6 Exhibition bout; two minute rounds
^Note 7 Gorilla Prizefighter tournament final

== Cejudo vs. Walton ==
Cejudo vs. Walton
- Date: 26 September 2026
- Venue: James L. Knight Center, Miami, Florida, US

Tale of the tape
Boxer	Henry Cejudo	Javon Walton
Nickname	"Tripple C"	"Wanna"
Hometown	Los Angeles, California, US	Atlanta, Georgia, US
Pre-fight record	0–0 (Boxing); 16–6 (8 KOs) (MMA)	3–0–1 (1 KO)
Height	5 ft 4 in (1.63 m)	5 ft 8 in (1.73 m)
Weight	147.0 lb (67 kg)	146.5 lb (66 kg)
Style	Orthodox	Orthodox
Recognition	Former UFC Flyweight and Bantamweight Champion	

Result
- Cejudo defeated Walton via Split Decision. (39–37 Cejudo, 37–39 Walton, 39–37 Cejudo)

Henry Cejudo vs. Javon Walton was a welterweight professional boxing match contested between former UFC Flyweight and Bantamweight Champion Henry Cejudo and professional boxer Javon Walton. The event took take place on 26 September 2026 at the James L. Knight Center, in Miami, Florida, US. Cejudo defeated Walton via split decision.

=== Background ===
In June 2026, Ali Abdelaziz posted on his X account that he is working on a boxing match for Henry Cejudo. On 17 July 2026, Kalle Sauerland and Mams Taylor announced Misfits Boxing's Q4 schedule on social media, which includes 12 September, 26 September, 10 October, and 5 December, the latter being the annual Misfits Mania. On 19 August, Misfits announced that Cejudo would be facing influencer Deen The Great in his boxing debut. However, on 15 September Misfits Boxing announced that Javon Walton would replace Deen as the headliner in collaboration with Most Valuable Promotions.

=== Card ===
Weight class		vs		Method	Round	Time	Notes
Welterweight	Henry Cejudo	def.	Javon Walton	SD	4		^{Note 1}
Middleweight	Tony Ferguson (c)	def.	Mahmoud Sebie	TKO	2/6	0:42	^{Note 2}^{,} ^{3}
Lightweight	FoxTheG (c)	def.	Justin Ibarrola	UD	6		^{Note 4}^{,} ^{5}
Middleweight	Dad	def.	Cherdleys	TKO	2/3	1:19	^{Note 6}
Cruiserweight	Louis Russell	def.	Dawson Myles Barrett	KO	2/3	0:31	^{Note 7}
Heavyweight	ENA	def.	Big Bobby	TKO	1/3	1:10	^{Note 8}

^Note 1 Cejudo's professional debut
^Note 2 Sebie's professional debut
^Note 3 For MFB middleweight title
^Note 4 Fox's professional debut
^Note 5 For MFB lightweight title
^Note 6 Exhibition bout; two minute rounds
^Note 7 Exhibition bout; two minute rounds
^Note 8 Exhibition bout; two minute rounds

== Essex vs. Dapper ==
Essex vs. Dapper
- Date: 10 October 2026
- Venue: Copper Box Arena, London, England

Tale of the tape
Boxer	Joey Essex	Dapper Laughs
Hometown	Essex, England	Kingston, England
Pre-fight record	1–0	1–0 (1 KO)
Height	5 ft 9 in (175 cm)	5 ft 9 in (175 cm)
Weight	172.4 lb (78 kg)	178.7 lb (81 kg)
Style	Orthodox	Orthodox

Result
- Bout ended in a split draw. (39–37 Essex, 40–36 Dapper, 38–38)

Joey Essex vs. Dapper Laughs was a MF–professional boxing match contested between television personality Joey Essex and stand up comedian Dapper Laughs. The event took place on 10 October 2026 at the Copper Box Arena in London, England. The bout ended in a split draw.

=== Background ===
On 17 July 2026, Sauerland and Taylor announced Misfits Boxing's Q4 schedule on social media, which includes 12 September, 26 September, 10 October, and 5 December, the latter being the annual Misfits Mania. On 19 September, Misfits announced that Joey Essex and Dapper Laughs would headline the event at the iconic Copper Box Arena, where KSI vs Joe Weller was held.

=== Card ===
Weight class		vs			Method	Round	Time	Notes
Welterweight	Joey Essex	vs.	Dapper Laughs	—N/a	SD	4
Middleweight	Swarmz	vs.	Ambush Buzzworl	—N/a	SD	4		^{Note 1}
Lightweight	Lil Cracra	def.	Joey Knight	Andy Howson	TKO	3/5	2:32	^{Note 2}
Heavyweight	Big Stacks	def.	James Collins	—N/a	SD	4		^{Note 3}
Heavyweight	Jordan McCann	def.	MoDeen	—N/a	TKO	2/5	0:37	^{Note 4}
Heavyweight	Plinio Cruz	def.	Gary Olive	—N/a	TKO	2/3	0:58
Featherweight	Nitboy & Kane West	def.	Cracky Tokky & Little T	—N/a	UD	4		^{Note 5}
Lightweight	Carla Jade (c)	def.	Erika Night	—N/a	UD	5		^{Note 6}

^Note 1 Two minute rounds
^Note 2 Survivor Tag bout
^Note 3 Two minute rounds
^Note 4 Exhibition bout; 1 minute rounds
^Note 5 Tag team bout
^Note 6 For MFB women's lightweight title

== Riley vs. Coupe ==
Riley vs. Coupe
- Date: 14 November 2026
- Venue: Wembley Arena, London, England
- Title on the line: European cruserweight title

Tale of the tape
Boxer	Viddal Riley	Seydi Coupe
Nickname	"The Rilest"	Le Matraqueur ("The Clubber")
Hometown	London, England	Roubaix, France
Pre-fight record	14–0 (7 KOs)	14–0 (9 KOs)
Height	6 ft 1 in (185 cm)	6 ft 1 in (185 cm)
Weight	199.4 lb (90 kg)	198.5 lb (90 kg)
Style	Orthodox	Orthodox
Recognition	European Cruserweight Champion	Former European Silver Cruiserweight Champion

Result
- Riley defeated Coupe via Unanimous Decision. (116–112 Riley, 117–111 Riley, 119–109 Riley)

Viddal Riley vs. Seydi Coupe, was a cruserweight professional boxing match contested between Viddal Riley and Seyid Coupe for the European cruserweight title. The bout took place on 14 November 2026 at Wembley Arena in London, England. Riley won by unanimous decision.

=== Background ===
On 11 September, MF Pro announced on social media that a triple headliner between Zelfa Barrett vs. Gavin Gwynne, Yaser Al Ghena vs. Ben Marskby, and Tom Welland vs. Jack Dillingham would take place on 14 November at Wembley Arena. On 7 October, MF Pro announced that Viddal Riley would defend his European cruiserweight title against Seyid Coupe as the new headliner.

=== Card ===
Weight class		vs		Method	Round	Time	Notes
Main Card
Cruiserweight	Viddal Riley	def.	Seydi Coupe	UD	12		^{Note 1}
Lightweight	Zelfa Barrett	def.	Gavin Gwynne	TKO	5/12	2:33	^{Note 2}
Super lightweight	Ben Marksby	def.	Yaser Al Ghena	UD	12		^{Note 3}
super welterweight	Dan Toward	def.	Jak Corrie	SD	10		^{Note 4}
Featherweight	Tom Welland	def.	Jack Dillingham	KO	7/10	2:50	^{Note 5}
Preliminary Card
Lightweight	Frankie Stringer	def.	Kurt Jackson	PTS	8
Lightweight	Kieran Molloy	def.	Steve Suppan	TKO	2/8	3:00
Featherweight	JP O'Meara	def.	Jorge Luis Huerta Balleza	PTS	6
Super lightweight	Arjon Basi	def.	Fernando Joaquin Valdez	PTS	4
Heavyweight	Derrick Osadolor	def.	Milen Paunov	TKO	2/4	1:49

^Note 1 For European cruiserweight title
^Note 2 For vacant WBA International lightweight title
^Note 3 For WBO European and Commonwealth super lightweight titles
^Note 4 For WBA Contiental super welterweight title
^Note 5 For vacant English featherweight title

== Jones vs. Pettus ==
Jones vs. Pettus
- Date: 20 November 2026
- Venue: Fantasy Springs Resort Casino, Indio, California, US

Tale of the tape
Boxer	Amari Jones	DeAundre Pettus
Nickname	"The Reaper"	"Dixianimal"
Hometown	Oakland, California, US	Orangeburg, South Carolina, US
Pre-fight record	17–0 (15 KOs)	14–4 (97 KOs)
Height	6 ft 10 in (208 cm)	5 ft 11 in (180 cm)
Weight	159.3 lb (72 kg)	160.0 lb (73 kg)
Style	Orthodox	Orthodox

Result
- Jones defeated Pettus via round 8 KO.

Amari Jones vs. DeAundre Pettus is an upcoming middleweight professional boxing match between Amari Jones and DeAundre Pettus. The bout is scheduled to take place on 20 November 2026 at the Fantasy Springs Resort Casino in Indio, California, US.

=== Background ===
On 9 October 2026, Golden Boy Promotions announced that #1 ranked IBF middleweight boxer Amari Jones would face DeAundre Pettus as the headline bout for their event on 20 November. On 23 October, MF Pro was announced as a co-promoter for the event alongside the undercard.

=== Card ===
Weight class		vs		Method	Round	Time	Notes
Golden Boy After Dark
Super featherweight	DJ Zamora	def.	Ruben Garcia Hernandez	TKO	6/10	3:00
Super bantamweight	Manny Flores	def.	Rashib Antonio Martinez Valadez	KO	3/10	0:15
Main Card
Middleweight	Amari Jones	def.	DeAundre Pettus	KO	8/12	1:08
Flyweight	Gabriela Fundora (c)	def.	Jasmina Zapotoczna	UD	10		^{Note 1}
Welterweight	Joel Iriarte	def.	Darvin Galeano	KO	2/8	2:31
Welterweight	Cayden Griffiths	def.	Jean Rivera-Pacheco	KO	6/8	1:59
Light welterweight	Ruslan Abdullaev	def.	Jonathan Navarro	KO	6/8	2:40
Preliminary Card
Middleweight	Amir Anderson	def.	Daniel Buciuc	KO	4/8	0:23
Super featherweight	Leo Sanchez	def.	Victor Morales	KO	1/8	2:48
Lightweight	Javier Meza	def.	Jonathan Figueroa	KO	4/6	0:56
Middleweight	Sebastian Mitry	def.	Anthony Alvarado	UD	6
Lightweight	David Lopez	def.	Alan Edgar Ayala Crisosto	KO	1/6	2:08

^Note 1 For WBA, WBC, IBF, WBO, and The Ring female flyweight titles

== DeMoor vs. Arlovski: New Blood ==
New Blood
- Date: 18 December 2026
- Venue: Nashville Auditorium, Nashville, Tennessee, US
- Titles on the line: MFB heavyweight title

Tale of the tape
Boxer	Chase DeMoor	Andrei Arlovski
Nickname	"Mr. Belt to Ass"	"The Pit Bull"
Hometown	Eatonville, Washington, US	Bobruysk, Byelorussian SSR, Soviet Union (now Babruysk, Belarus)
Pre-fight record	17–3–1 (13 KOs)	1–0 (1 KO) (Boxing); 34–24 (17 KOs) (MMA)
Height	6 ft 1 in (185 cm)	
Recognition	MFB Heavyweight Champion; WBC US Silver Heavyweight Campion	Former UFC Heavyweight Champion; BKFC Heavyweight Champion

Chase DeMoor vs. Andrei Arlovski, billed as New Blood, is an upcoming MF-professional boxing event contested between American crossoxer boxer Chase DeMoor and Belarusian mixed martial artist Andrei Arlovski for the MFB Heavyweight Title.

=== Background ===
On 17 July 2026, Sauerland and Taylor announced Misfits Boxing's Q4 schedule on social media, which includes 12 September, 26 September, 10 October, and 5 December, the latter being the annual Misfits Mania. Tommy Fury was in negotiations to headline the event against Hafþór Björnsson, but the bout ultimately fell through. On 3 November, Sauerland announced that Mania was postponed.

On 15 November, Misfits Boxing announced a new event for 18 December featuring Chase DeMoor vs. Andrei Arlovski as the headliner.

=== Card ===
Weight class		vs		Method	Round	Time	Notes
Main Card
Heavyweight	Chase DeMoor (c)	vs.	Andrei Arlovski		– (8)		^{Note 1}
TBA	Jerry Purpdrank & Matt Minett	vs.	80k Twins		– (4)		^{Note 2}
Heavyweight	King Azoulay	vs.	Natan Marcoń		– (4)
Lightweight	FoxTheG (c)	vs.	Felony Charles		– (5)		^{Note 3}
Heavyweight	Matt Riddle	vs.	ENA		– (4)
Middleweight	Capri Jones	vs.	Nas Falana		– (3)
Lightweight	Brittany Rae	vs.	Xoxsevyn		– (4)
Heavyweight	Chris Barnett	vs.	Blobtang		– (4)
Middleweight	Jenny Savage	vs.	Killer Bee		– (4)
Lightweight	Austin Duly	vs.	TBA		– (6)		^{Note 4}
Super middleweight	Ethan Smith	vs.	TBA		– (6)		^{Note 5}

^Note 1 For MFB heavyweight title
^Note 2 Tag team bout
^Note 3 For MFB lightweight title
^Note 4 Professional bout
^Note 5 Professional bout

== See also ==
- 2022 in Misfits Boxing
- 2023 in Misfits Boxing
- 2024 in Misfits Boxing
- 2025 in Misfits Boxing
