= Kevin Walsh (boxer) =

American boxer (born 1992)

Personal information
- Nickname: King
- Born: September 8, 1992 (age 33) Brockton, Massachusetts, U.S.
- Height: 5 ft 7.5 in (171 cm)
- Weight: Featherweight; Super Featherweight; Lightweight

Boxing career
- Reach: 65 in (165 cm)
- Stance: Orthodox

Boxing record
- Total fights: 21
- Wins: 21
- Win by KO: 11
- Losses: 0
- No contests: 0

Kevin Walsh Jr. is an American professional boxer. He is currently ranked #63 in the world in the Featherweight category according to BoxRec.

== Professional career ==
Walsh made his professional debut on May 8, 2021, against Henry Garcia. Walsh won the fight via a first-round TKO.

After accumulating a career record of 6–0, he faced Christian Otero on January 21, 2023, for the vacant USA New England Super Featherweight title. Walsh won the fight via a Split Decision, winning his first career championship.

After another four fights and winning all of them, he faced Matt Doherty on March 23, 2024, for the vacant USA New England Lightweight title. Walsh won the fight via a Unanimous Decision, winning his second career championship.

After another two wins, and a record of 14–0, he faced Irvin Gonzalez on November 2, 2024, in his first defense of the USA New England super featherweight title. Walsh won the fight via a fourth-round TKO, defending his championship.

His next fight came on February 15, 2025, where he faced Ricky de los Santos for Ricky's WBC USA Silver Featherweight title. Walsh won the fight via an eighth-round TKO, winning his third career championship.

His first title defense came on May 10, 2025, against Tramaine Williams. Walsh won the fight via a Split Decision.

After a non-title win over Angel Luna, he defended his WBC title for a second time on November 1, 2025, against Jose Sosa. Walsh won the fight via a Unanimous Decision.

Walsh challenged WBC International featherweight champion Mick Conlan at the SSE Arena in Belfast, Northern Ireland, on March 20, 2026. He won by split decision with the judges' scorecards reading 96–94, 96–94 and 93–97.

== Professional boxing record ==
21 fights	21 wins	0 losses
By knockout	11	0
By decision	10	0

No.	Result	Record	Opponent	Type	Round, time	Date	Location	Notes
21	Win	21–0	Dannis Aguero Arias	TKO	1 (8), 2:14	Jun 24, 2026	Mohegan Sun Arena, Uncasville, Connecticut, U.S.	
20	Win	20–0	Michael Conlan	SD	10	Mar 20, 2026	SSE Arena, Belfast, Northern Ireland	Won WBC international featherweight title
19	Win	19–0	Jose Sosa	UD	8	Nov 1, 2025	Mohegan Sun Arena, Uncasville, Connecticut, U.S.	Retained WBC USA Silver featherweight title
18	Win	18–0	Angel Luna	TKO	1 (8), 1:20	Sep 6, 2025	Lowell Memorial Auditorium, Lowell, Massachusetts, U.S.	
17	Win	17–0	Tramaine Williams	SD	10	May 10, 2025	Foxwoods Resort Casino, Mashantucket, Connecticut, U.S.	Retained WBC USA Silver featherweight title
16	Win	16–0	Ricky de los Santos	TKO	8 (10), 0:27	Feb 15, 2025	Mohegan Sun Arena, Uncasville, Connecticut, U.S.	Won WBC USA Silver featherweight title
15	Win	15–0	Irvin Gonzalez	TKO	4 (8), 0:23	Nov 2, 2024	Mohegan Sun Arena, Uncasville, Connecticut, U.S.	Retained USA New England super featherweight title
14	Win	14–0	Yeifer Valencia	KO	1 (6), 2:00	Sep 7, 2024	Foxwoods Resort Casino, Mashantucket, Connecticut, U.S.	
13	Win	13–0	Tackie Annan	KO	2 (6), 1:38	May 11, 2024	Twin River Event Center, Lincoln, Rhode Island, U.S.	
12	Win	12–0	Matt Doherty	UD	8	Mar 23, 2024	Twin River Event Center, Lincoln, Rhode Island, U.S.	Won vacant USA New England lightweight title
11	Win	11–0	Darrell Rivera	KO	1 (6), 1:54	Feb 3, 2024	Mohegan Sun Arena, Uncasville, Connecticut, U.S.	
10	Win	10–0	Philip Davis	UD	6	Aug 5, 2023	Polar Park, Worcester, Massachusetts, U.S.	
9	Win	9–0	Marcello Williams	UD	6	May 20, 2023	Park Theatre, Cranston, Rhode Island, U.S.	
8	Win	8–0	Andrew Bentley	UD	6	Mar 16, 2023	Agganis Arena, Boston, Massachusetts, U.S.	
7	Win	7–0	Christian Otero	SD	6	Jan 21, 2023	Mohegan Sun Arena, Uncasville, Connecticut, U.S.	Won vacant USA New England super featherweight title
6	Win	6–0	Braulio Avila	TKO	2 (4), 1:07	Apr 22, 2022	Castleton Banquet and Conference Center, Windham, New Hampshire, U.S.	
5	Win	5–0	Nathan Balakin	UD	6	Jan 30, 2022	Castleton Banquet and Conference Center, Windham, New Hampshire, U.S.	
4	Win	4–0	Carlos Galindo	UD	4	Nov 24, 2021	Castleton Banquet and Conference Center, Windham, New Hampshire, U.S.	
3	Win	3–0	Celiel Castillo Pimentel	TKO	1 (4), 2:47	Sep 24, 2021	Castleton Banquet and Conference Center, Windham, New Hampshire, U.S.	
2	Win	2–0	Michael Taylor	KO	1 (4), 2:12	Jul 30, 2021	Castleton Banquet and Conference Center, Windham, New Hampshire, U.S.	
1	Win	1–0	Henry Garcia	TKO	1 (4), 2:50	May 8, 2021	Southpaw Boxing and Fitness, Windham, New Hampshire, U.S.	
