= Floyd Schofield =

American boxer (born 2002)

Floyd Schofield Jr.
Personal information
- Nickname: Kid Austin
- Born: August 27, 2002 (age 24) Jersey City, New Jersey, U.S.
- Height: 5 ft 7 in (170 cm)
- Weight: Lightweight

Boxing career
- Reach: 67 in (170 cm)
- Stance: Orthodox (Switch hitter)

Boxing record
- Total fights: 20
- Wins: 20
- Win by KO: 13

Floyd Schofield Jr. (born August 27, 2002) is an American professional boxer. He has held the World Boxing Association (WBA) lightweight title since October 2026.

== Early life ==
Schofield had a very tough upbringing. Born in Jersey City, New Jersey he moved to Austin, Texas hence his nickname. His father gained custody of him when he was 2 years old but they struggled financially, being homeless and begging for money. This led to Schofield entering the sport of boxing at age 8. He has stated that Sugar Ray Robinson is his idol.

== Amateur career ==
Schofield won numerous titles as an amateur and finished up with a record 180–62.

== Professional career ==
Schofield's early pro performances caught the eye of boxing legend Oscar de La Hoya who ended up signing him to his Golden Boy Promotions. Since signing with Golden Boy, Schofield has appeared on may big cards including Gervonta Davis vs. Ryan Garcia.

Schofield was scheduled to challenge WBC lightweight champion Shakur Stevenson on February 22, 2025, at the Kingdom Arena in Riyadh, Saudi Arabia. He withdrew from the fight three days before it was due to take place after being hospitalized for an unspecified illness.

On June 28, 2025, Schofield faced Tevin Farmer at the Honda Center in Anaheim, California. He won by knockout on the first round.

Schofield took on Lucas Bahdi at Wintrust Arena in Chicago, Illinois, for the vacant WBA lightweight title, winning via unanimous decision.

== Professional boxing record ==
20 fights	20 wins	0 losses
By knockout	13	0
By decision	6	0
By disqualification	1	0

No.	Result	Record	Opponent	Type	Round, time	Date	Location	Notes
20	Win	20–0	Lucas Bahdi	UD	12	Oct 10, 2026	Wintrust Arena, Chicago, Illinois, U.S.	Won vacant WBA lightweight title
19	Win	19–0	Tevin Farmer	KO	1 (10), 1:18	Jun 28, 2025	Honda Center, Anaheim, California, U.S.	Won vacant WBA Continental lightweight title
18	Win	18–0	Rene Tellez Giron	UD	12	Nov 2, 2024	The Theater at Virgin Hotels, Paradise, Nevada, U.S.	
17	Win	17–0	Estueri Suero	DQ	5 (8), 2:07	Mar 16, 2024	Chelsea Ballroom, Paradise, Nevada, U.S.	
16	Win	16–0	Ricardo Lopez Torres	TKO	1 (10), 1:51	Dec 2, 2023	Toyota Center, Houston, Texas, U.S.	
15	Win	15–0	Haskell Rhodes	UD	10	Jul 8, 2023	AT&T Center, San Antonio, Texas, U.S.	
14	Win	14–0	Jesus Valentin Leon	KO	2 (10), 2:08	Apr 22, 2023	T-Mobile Arena, Paradise, Nevada, U.S.	
13	Win	13–0	Alberto Mercado	UD	10	Jan 28, 2023	YouTube Theater, Inglewood, California, U.S.	Won vacant WBA International lightweight title
12	Win	12–0	Daniel Rosas	KO	1 (8), 1:37	Oct 10, 2022	Fantasy Springs Resort Casino, Indio, California, U.S.	
11	Win	11–0	Rodrigo Guerrero	RTD	5 (8), 3:00	Aug 6, 2022	Dickies Arena, Fort Worth, Texas, U.S.	
10	Win	10–0	Juan Antonio Lopez	KO	6 (8), 1:10	May 21, 2022	Davies Boxing and Fitness, San Antonio, Texas, U.S.	
9	Win	9–0	Julio Sanchez	KO	1 (8), 2:08	Feb 26, 2022	Davies Boxing and Fitness, San Antonio, Texas, U.S.	Won vacant ABF intercontinental lightweight title
8	Win	8–0	Pedro Vincente Scharbaai	UD	8	Oct 22, 2021	Davies Boxing and Fitness, San Antonio, Texas, U.S.	Won vacant NABF Junior super featherweight title
7	Win	7–0	Roberto Almazan Monreal	KO	2 (6), 1:01	Aug 20, 2021	Davies Boxing and Fitness, San Antonio, Texas, U.S.	Won vacant TCSP Texas super featherweight title
6	Win	6–0	Darryl Hayes	PTS	6	Jun 19, 2021	Buckhead Fight Club, Atlanta, Georgia, U.S.	
5	Win	5–0	Danny Flores	TKO	3 (6), 2:59	May 21, 2021	Bryan Glazer Family JCC Auditorium, Tampa, Florida, U.S.	
4	Win	4–0	Mike Fowler	TKO	1 (4), 1:37	Apr 3, 2021	Buckhead Fight Club, Atlanta, Georgia, U.S.	
3	Win	3–0	Jonathan Conde	KO	1 (4), 2:29	Mar 5, 2021	Osceola Heritage Park, Kissimmee, Florida, U.S.	
2	Win	2–0	Cesar Valencia Aguilar	TKO	2 (4), 0:27	Jan 30, 2021	Big Punch Arena, Tijuana, Mexico	
1	Win	1–0	Richard Esquibel	KO	1 (4), 1:40	Oct 9, 2020	Osceola Heritage Park, Kissimmee, Florida, U.S.	

Sporting positions
World boxing titles
Vacant Title last held by Gervonta Davis	WBA lightweight champion October 10, 2026 – present	Incumbent
