= Joel Iriarte =

American boxer (born 2003)

Personal information
- Born: 10 May 2003 (age 23) Woodland Hills, California, U.S
- Height: 6 ft 1 in (1.85 m)
- Weight: Welterweight

Boxing career
- Stance: Orthodox

Boxing record
- Total fights: 9
- Wins: 9
- Win by KO: 7
- Losses: 0

Joel Iriarte (born 10 May 2003) is an American professional boxer. He currently competes in the welterweight division.

== Amateur career ==
Iriarte had a stellar amateur career. With over 300 amateur fights, he picked up gold medals in the Hungary Junior International Tournament, and the Pan American Games in Guadalajara. He won 17 national titles, including at the Junior Golden Gloves, USA Boxing Nationals, National Qualifiers, National PAL, and Ringside tournaments. Iriarte decided to skip the olympics and turn pro to avoid controversial judging.

== Professional career ==
Joel Iriarte signed with Golden Boy Promotions when he turned pro. His promoter boxing legend Oscar De La Hoya expects Iriarte to be fast tracked to a world title shot In his second fight he featured on the undercard of the cruiserweight world title fight between Arsen Goulamirian and Gilberto Ramirez. Iriarte stopped his Mexican opponent Kevin Beltran Aguirre in the first round, breaking his nose and forcing him to take the full count.

== Professional boxing record ==
9 fights	9 wins	0 losses
By knockout	8	0
By decision	1	0

No.	Result	Record	Opponent	Type	Round, time	Date	Location	Notes
9	Win	9–0	Darvin Galeano	KO	2 (8), 2:31	Nov 20, 2026	Fantasy Springs Resort Casino, Indio, California, U.S.	
8	Win	8–0	Kevin Johnson	UD	8	Jun 28, 2025	Honda Center, Anaheim, California, U.S.	
7	Win	7–0	Marcos Leonardo Jimenez	KO	1 (8), 1:44	Apr 19, 2025	Frontwave Arena, Oceanside, California, U.S.	
6	Win	6–0	Darel Harris	KO	2 (6), 1:21	Feb 15, 2025	Honda Center, Anaheim, California, U.S.	
5	Win	5–0	Xavier Madrid	TKO	1 (6), 2:50	Nov 2, 2024	Virgin Hotels, Paradise, Nevada, U.S.	
4	Win	4–0	Miguel Ortiz	TKO	1 (6), 2:15	Aug 10, 2024	Mandalay Bay, Paradise, Nevada, U.S.	
3	Win	3–0	Yainel Alvarez	KO	2 (6), 2:41	Jul 6, 2024	Toyota Arena, Ontario, California, U.S.	
2	Win	2–0	Kevin Beltran Aguirre	KO	1 (4), 2:09	Mar 30, 2024	Youtube Theater, Inglewood, California, U.S	
1	Win	1–0	Bryan Carguacundo	TKO	2 (4), 1:26	Mar 16, 2024	Chelsea Ballroom, Paradise, Nevada, U.S.	
