= Lucas Bahdi =

Canadian boxer (born 1994)

Personal information
- Nickname: Prince
- Born: January 27, 1994 (age 32) Niagara Falls, Ontario, Canada
- Height: 5 ft 9 in (175 cm)
- Weight: Lightweight

Boxing career
- Stance: Orthodox

Boxing record
- Total fights: 21
- Wins: 20
- Win by KO: 15
- Losses: 1

Lucas Bahdi (born January 27, 1994) is a Canadian professional boxer. He challenged for the WBA lightweight title in 2026.

== Early life ==
Bahdi is of Italian and Palestinian heritage. His father George is a prominent builder in the Niagara Falls area.

== Amateur career ==
Bahdi was a three time national champion. He turned pro, ending his olympic hopes due to losing trust with the national team programme.

== Professional career ==
=== Bahdi vs. Amparan ===
Bahdi claimed the first title of his professional career against Mexican Jesus Amparan. In round nine, Bahdi dropped Amparan with a hard right hand forcing the referee to wave it off, making Bahdi the IBF North American champion. The fight took place in Bahdi's at the Convention Center in his hometown of Niagara Falls, on May 21, 2023.

=== Bahdi vs. Sylve ===
Bahdi had his biggest win to date on the undercard of Jake Paul vs. Mike Perry at Amalie Arena in Tampa, Florida, United States, on July 20, 2024, against Ashton Sylve. Despite being outpointed most of the fight, Bahdi knocked out Sylve in the sixth round, which became a knockout of the year candidate.

It was announced on November 21, 2024, that Bahdi had signed with Most Valuable Promotions.

=== Bahdi vs. Schofield ===
Bahdi faced Floyd Schofield at Wintrust Arena in Chicago, Illinois, United States, for the vacant WBA lightweight title, losing via unanimous decision.

== Professional boxing record ==
21 fights	20 wins	1 loss
By knockout	15	0
By decision	5	1

No.	Result	Record	Opponent	Type	Round, time	Date	Location	Notes
21	Loss	20–1	Floyd Schofield	UD	12	10 Oct 2026	Wintrust Arena, Chicago, Illinois, U.S.	For vacant WBA lightweight title
20	Win	20–0	Roger Gutiérrez	UD	12	23 Aug 2025	Caribe Royale, Orlando, Florida, U.S.	
19	Win	19–0	Ryan Jamez Racaza	UD	10	7 Mar 2025	Toronto Casino Resort, Toronto, Canada	
18	Win	18–0	Armando Casamonica	MD	10	15 Nov 2024	AT&T Stadium, Arlington, Texas, U.S.	
17	Win	17–0	Ashton Sylve	KO	6 (10), 2:27	20 Jul 2024	Amalie Arena, Tampa, Florida, U.S.	
16	Win	16–0	José Luis Rodríguez	TKO	4 (8), 1:25	1 Jun 2024	Niagara Falls Convention Centre, Niagara Falls, Canada	
15	Win	15–0	Eliot Chávez	KO	5 (8)	7 Sep 2023	Montreal Casino, Montreal, Canada	
14	Win	14–0	Jesús Amparan	KO	9 (10), 1:51	21 May 2023	Niagara Falls Convention Centre, Niagara Falls, Canada	Won vacant IBF North American lightweight title
13	Win	13–0	Diego Andrade Chávez	UD	8	26 Nov 2022	Red Owl Performance Centre, Brampton, Canada	
12	Win	12–0	Diego Fabián Eligio	UD	10	2 Jul 2022	Niagara Falls Convention Centre, Niagara Falls, Canada	
11	Win	11–0	Rodolfo Flores Moreno	TKO	3 (6), 1:36	7 May 2022	Centre 200, Sydney, Canada	
10	Win	10–0	Alejandro Palmero Hernández	TKO	4 (6), 1:50	28 Nov 2020	Deportivo Cri-Cri, Cuernavaca, Mexico	
9	Win	9–0	Carlos López Marmolejo	RTD	1 (8), 3:00	29 Feb 2020	Deportivo Lázaro Cardenas, Mexico City, Mexico	
8	Win	8–0	Genaro García Gutiérrez	TKO	1 (6), 2:29	18 Jan 2020	Domo Deportivo Metropolitano, Ciudad Nezahualcóyotl, Mexico	
7	Win	7–0	Victor Cardozo Coronel	KO	2 (8), 0:32	23 Nov 2019	Sheraton on the Falls Hotel, Niagara Falls, Canada	
6	Win	6–0	Victor Campos Capetillo	TKO	1 (6), 2:47	19 Oct 2019	Peterborough Memorial Centre, Peterborough, Canada	
5	Win	5–0	Jonathan Ivan Sánchez	TKO	1 (4), 2:46	28 Sep 2019	Salón Sagitario, Ciudad Nezahualcóyotl, Mexico	
4	Win	4–0	Laramie Carmona	TKO	1 (4), 3:00	7 Sep 2019	Hamilton Convention Centre, Hamilton, Canada	
3	Win	3–0	Luis Granados González	KO	1 (4), 2:56	3 Aug 2019	Deportivo Lázaro Cardenas, Mexico City, Mexico	
2	Win	2–0	Ricardo González Guillén	TKO	1 (4), 0:55	29 Jun 2019	Scotiabank Convention Centre, Niagara Falls, Canada	
1	Win	1–0	Luis Yan Revilla	KO	2 (4), 0:44	25 May 2019	Foro 360, Naucalpan, Mexico	
