= Jake Paul vs. Anderson Silva =

2022 professional crossover boxing match

- Date: October 29, 2022
- Venue: Desert Diamond Arena, Glendale, Arizona, U.S.

Tale of the tape
Boxer	(United States) Jake Paul	(Brazil) Anderson Silva
Nickname	The Problem Child	The Spider
Hometown	Cleveland, Ohio, U.S.	São Paulo, Brazil
Pre-fight record	5–0 (4 KOs)	3–1 (2 KOs) (Boxing); 34–11–1 (23 KOs) (MMA)
Age	25 years, 9 months	47 years, 6 months
Height	6 ft 1 in (1.85 m)	6 ft 2 in (1.88 m)
Weight	186 1/2 lb (85 kg)	186 lb (84 kg)
Style	Orthodox	Southpaw
Recognition		Former UFC middleweight champion Most consecutive wins in UFC history (16); Tied third for most KO wins in UFC history Member of the UFC Hall of Fame (Class of 2023)

Result
- Paul wins via 8-round unanimous decision (77–74, 78–73, 78–73)

Jake Paul vs. Anderson Silva was a cruiserweight professional crossover boxing match contested between American YouTuber Jake Paul and Brazilian mixed martial artist Anderson Silva. The bout took place at the Desert Diamond Arena in Glendale, Arizona on October 29, 2022. Paul won via unanimous decision. The fight sold 200,000–300,000 PPV buys.

== Background ==
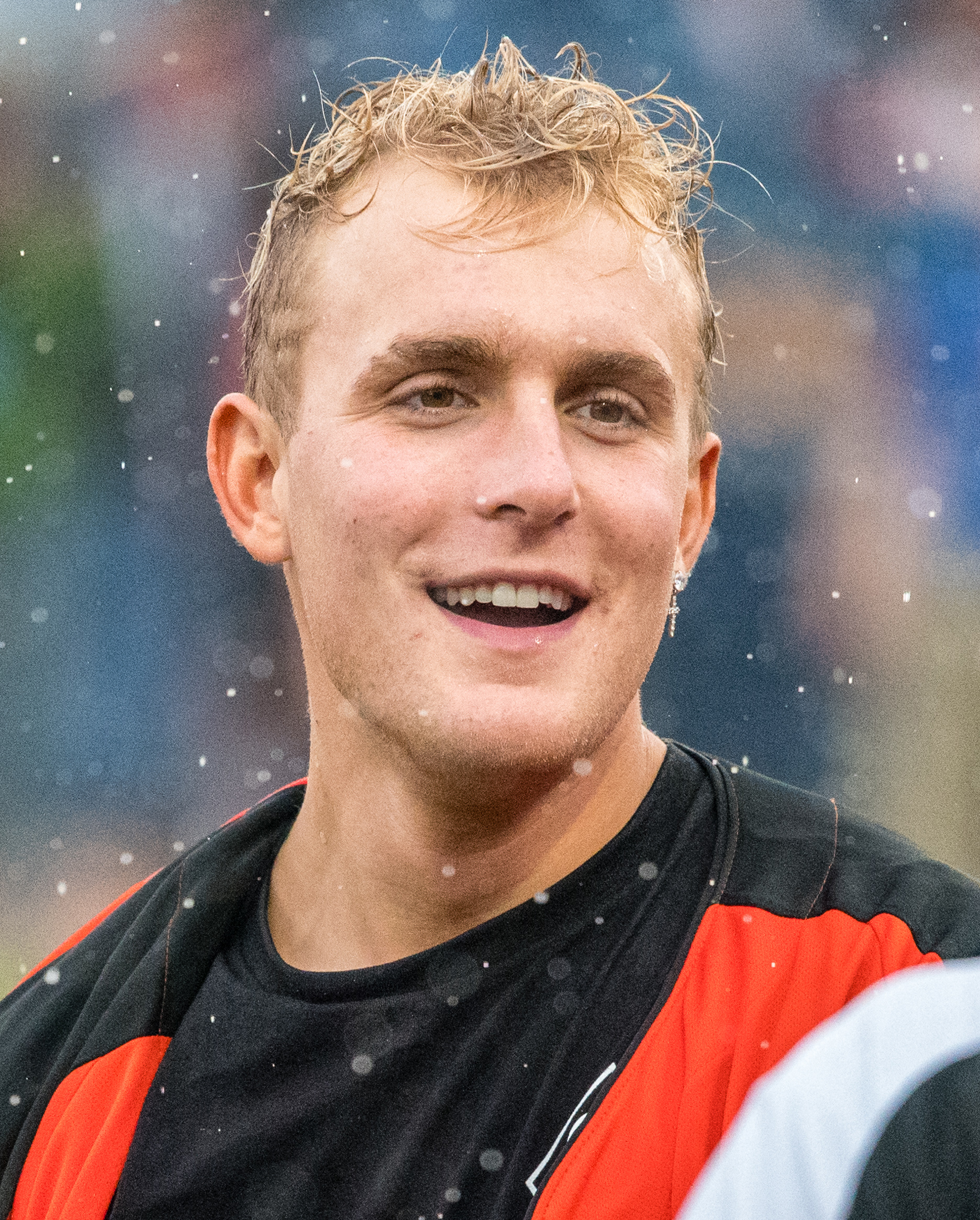
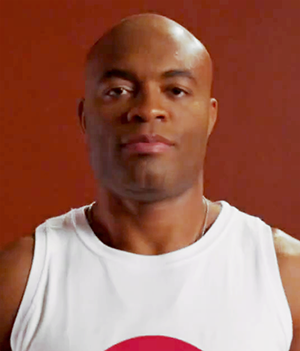
Jake Paul (left) and Anderson Silva (right).

It was announced on September 6, 2022, that undefeated 25-year old Jake Paul would face mixed martial artist, boxer and former UFC Middleweight Champion 47-year old Anderson Silva on October 29 in Glendale, Arizona.

== Press conferences ==
Three press conferences were held in the following cities:

- 12 September 2022 – 6121 Sunset Blvd, Los Angeles, California
- 13 September 2022 – 9400 W Maryland Ave, Glendale, Arizona
- 27 October 2022 – Glendale, Arizona

During the conferences, Paul spoke about growing up as one of "Silva’s fans" and watching the Brazilian "dominate" the sport.

== Fight card ==
Main Card (PPV)
Weight class				Method	Round	Time	Notes
Cruiserweight	Jake Paul	def.	Anderson Silva	UD	8/8
Lightweight	Ashton Sylve	def.	Braulio Rodriguez	KO	1/8	1:01
Bantamweight	Alexandro Santiago	def.	Antonio Nieves	RTD	7/10	3:00
Cruiserweight	Uriah Hall	def.	Le'Veon Bell	UD	4/4		(Note: Hall and Bell's professional debuts)
Cruiserweight	Chris Avila	def.	Dr. Mikhail Varshavski	UD	4/4		(Note: Varshavski's professional debut)
Preliminary Card (Showtime Sports YouTube channel)
Heavyweight	Jeremiah Milton	def.	Quintin Sumpter	TKO	5/6	0:39
Super middleweight	Shadasia Green	def.	Ogleidis Suárez	RTD	5/8	2:00
Super bantamweight	Danny Barrios Flores	def.	Edgar Ortiz Jr.	TKO	6/6	0:30
Super bantamweight	Adrian Rodriguez	def.	Dominique Griffin	UD	4/4
Middleweight	Eliezer Silva	def.	Anthony Hannah	KO	2/4	1:57

== Result ==
The fight, in front of a 14,000 strong crowd on the night of October 29, 2022, lasted all the designated eight rounds. Paul was awarded the win by a unanimous decision, which moved him to a record of 6 wins and no defeats. In the final round, he knocked down Silva.

=== Pay-per-view numbers ===
The bout priced at $59.99 sold around an estimated 200–300,000 pay-per-view buys. Paul revealed in an episode of his brother's podcast Impaulsive that his suspicion behind the low sales performance was due to an incident involving Silva claiming within an interview that he was knocked out during a sparring session within his camp before the upcoming fight, thus creating a lack of interest in the bout.
