= Gervonta Davis vs. Ryan Garcia =

Boxing competition

It Doesn't Get Any Better Than This
- Date: April 22, 2023
- Venue: T-Mobile Arena, Paradise, Nevada, U.S.

Tale of the tape
Boxer	Gervonta Davis	Ryan Garcia
Nickname	Tank	King
Hometown	Baltimore, Maryland, U.S.	Los Alamitos, California, U.S.
Pre-fight record	28–0 (26 KO)	23–0 (19 KO)
Age	28 years, 5 months	24 years, 8 months
Height	5 ft 5 1/2 in (166 cm)	5 ft 10 in (178 cm)
Weight	135 lb (61 kg)	135 1/2 lb (61 kg)
Style	Southpaw	Orthodox
Recognition	WBA (Regular) lightweight champion	WBC interim lightweight champion

Result
- Davis wins by 7th-round KO

Gervonta Davis vs. Ryan Garcia, billed as It Doesn't Get Any Better Than This, was a professional boxing match contested between WBA (Regular) lightweight champion Gervonta Davis and WBC interim lightweight champion Ryan Garcia. The bout took place at a catchweight of 136 lbs, with a 10 lbs rehydration clause, on April 22, 2023, at T-Mobile Arena in Paradise, Nevada.

== Background & build-up ==
The development of a fight between Davis and Garcia evolved over several years, beginning with early discussions in mid-2020 when both fighters publicly agreed, in principle, to face each other in 2021. By September 2022, negotiations had resumed but were still progressing slowly, with reports indicating that talks were ongoing and no agreement had yet been reached. Progress was made the following month. By late October 2022, both sides had agreed to a framework for the bout, although key issues, particularly regarding pay-per-view distribution between Showtime and DAZN, remained unresolved.

On November 17, Davis and Garcia announced via Instagram that a deal had been reached for a fight in 2023, set at a 136-pound catchweight limit and planned as a Showtime Pay-Per-View main event. Davis confirmed he would fight on January 7, which was expected to headline a Showtime PPV event, taking place in Washington, D.C. Garcia had been planning to campaign at 140 pounds, but agreed to drop weight to face Davis. This was seen as a tune-up fight before facing Garcia. Showtime and DAZN reached an agreement, which saw Showtime responsible for production and telecast, and while not classed as a joint PPV, DAZN was allowed to sell the fight on their platform. Settling the broadcast issue was key to moving the negotiations further, as Davis had fought his last 11 bouts on Showtime, whereas Garcia's last 7 fights streamed were on DAZN. The final scheduling of the contest depended on both the outcome of that bout and Davis's legal proceedings related to a pending court case in February 2023. Davis later announced Hector Luis Garcia as his opponent for January 7.

On the announcement, Garcia's stated:

“This is the fight I want and this is the fight boxing needs. I am going to knock ‘Tank’ out and take my place as the face of our incredible sport… I appreciate Tank volunteering to get beat so that I can get to work.”

Oscar De La Hoya backed Garcia to win, citing his speed, power, and ring intelligence, and described the contest as a high-risk bout in which a single mistake could result in a knockout. He stated that significant effort had been required to finalise the deal, including concessions during negotiations and cooperation between broadcasters, staying he had to “bend over backwards” to get the deal finalised.

On November 20, Garcia indicated that he wanted to stay aligned with Davis’s schedule, announcing that he would also return that same month for a "stay busy" fight. Garcia had fought twice earlier in 2022 after a 15-month break, while Davis had also remained active with two victories since December 2021. Speaking to Stephen A. Smith, Garcia said, “I’ve been asking for this fight since I was 17, 18 years old… I guess he just always wanted to take the easier route, which is fine… The fight’s happening.” Early perceptions had favored Davis due to his power and record, though Garcia remained confident, criticizing Davis's opposition and believing in a decisive victory for himself.

In December, Davis publicly accused Garcia of potential doping in a social media post, questioning his physical appearance and referencing concerns about drug-testing standards. Garcia denied the allegations, stating that he did not use supplements. Garcia was scheduled to have his own 'warm-up' fight in January against 35-year old Mercito Gesta (33–3–3, 17 KOs); however, on December 17, he withdrew from the bout in order to proceed directly to his scheduled fight with Davis. Garcia stated that he did not require a tune-up contest and preferred to focus entirely on the higher-profile matchup. The decision meant Garcia would enter the bout following an extended layoff, while Davis remained active with a January 7 fight against Hector Luis Garcia. His promoter, De La Hoya, criticised the decision as a potential mistake, noting that Davis would benefit from a preparatory bout. Davis also had his say on Garcia not going ahead with his fight against Gesta, saying, “I think Ryan’s being lazy not taking a fight before our fight… now he’s got some money and a little bit of fame, and he’s partying… it’s for him to tighten up before it’s too late.” Davis began speculating that Garcia's decision to withdraw from the planned tune-up was due either to the potential use of performance-enhancing drugs or a desire to avoid weight-cutting prior to their scheduled fight. Davis also questioned Garcia’s physical changes and conditioning, though Garcia had not tested positive for any banned substances. Garcia addressed claims from Davis suggesting he might be using performance‑enhancing drugs, dismissing them as psychological tactics.

Following Davis’s victory over Hector Luis García on January 7, 2023, Ryan Garcia publicly called for their long‑anticipated bout, stating, “No more talking, let’s get it on,” and declaring “it’s over for you.” Davis said that their fight was targeted for April, responding, “God willing, I’m ready for the fight,” and adding, “Let’s see who’s really about that.” Despite public statements that the deal was “done,” Davis clarified that negotiations were “going in the right direction”, and the remaining step was Garcia’s formal acceptance. On January 15, De La Hoya stated that he had not received a contract for the proposed bout, despite both fighters having announced a prior agreement in principle. De La Hoya issued a deadline, declaring, “I have no contract… deadline for me is Monday (the following day) or I’m moving on,” and indicated that he would seek an alternative opponent for Garcia if terms were not finalized. Showtime Sports president Stephen Espinoza stated that, although a signed contract had not yet been completed, there had been a “very detailed exchange of terms” and that the fight was progressing toward finalisation. Reports indicated that the remaining issues included pay‑per‑view distribution and contractual details. On January 18, De La Hoya confirmed that a contract had been received for the proposed bout, indicating that final details were being completed. The fight was targeted for April 15, 2023.

Allegiant Stadium in Las Vegas was considered a potential venue for the event. The stadium opened in 2020 and had yet to host a boxing event. Alternative venues included T‑Mobile Arena and MGM Grand Garden Arena. De La Hoya stated that negotiations had reached an advanced stage but were stalled by disagreement over who would control a rematch. He said, "We're literally down at the 1-yard line; what's holding everything up is the rematch clause. It's only fair if Ryan wins, then our side controls everything as the A-side." His argument was based on the fact that the winner should become the “A-side”. He stated that Davis's side, led by Al Haymon, had imposed multiple conditions and maintained significant control over the negotiations. Garcia, via social media, rejected the idea of a rematch clause entirely, stating “No rematch clause. Winner takes all coward.” The date was pushed back one week, to take place on April 22. The rematch clause was only in place for Davis, meaning that if Garcia was to lose the fight, he was not able to automatically activate a rematch clause. At the time of the fight being announced, Davis was a 3-1 favorite, according to Caesars Sportsbook. On March 7, the T-Mobile Arena was announced as the venue.

The first press conference took place on March 8 in New York City. Both fighters demonstrated mutual respect initially by acknowledging each other's skills, however; the tone became more heated toward the end, with verbal exchanges. Garcia stated that the fight could be “more of a thinking fight” despite earlier bold predictions, while Davis dismissed those remarks and predicted victory. Both were confident, with Garcia promising “a classic” and Davis stating that the outcome would depend on “who wants it more.” The press conference began at 2:15 pm ET, having being pushed back from the original scheduled time of 12:30 pm ET. Davis turned up on stage 10 minutes after it had started. De La Hoya believed the fight could exceed 2.4 million pay‑per‑view buys, the figure associated with his fight against Mayweather. He viewed the fight as a potential record-breaking commercial event. He also stated that boxers today benefit from greater visibility through social media and both Davis and Garcia had large fan bases. Some critics viewed his prediction as unrealistic. On March 11, after Davis publicly questioned Garcia’s decision to decline a tune‑up fight, Garcia stated that he chose not to risk the fight being jeopardised after difficult negotiations, explaining, “I just didn’t wanna put that at risk,” and citing the possibility of injury, noting, “You could hurt your hand, head‑butts… I made sure we got to the finish line.” De La Hoya revealed that the fight nearly fell apart during negotiations and credited himself and his company, Golden Boy Promotions, with “reviving” the deal and ensuring the fight was finalised. He praised Garcia for agreeing to multiple contractual concessions, describing it as “unheard of” and mentioned the effort that was required to finalise the fight.

On March 12, Davis stated that he was holding his training camp at the Mayweather Boxing Club in Las Vegas and that he had reunited with Leonard Ellerbe. Although Davis had previously left Mayweather Promotions, the collaboration was maintained for the event, with Davis stating that the gym was a suitable training environment. His trainer, Calvin Ford, said, "We like Mayweather’s gym. Tank has said he feels back at home." On March 22, Davis stated that he had been prevented from using the Mayweather Boxing Club. He claimed in a social media post that Mayweather had barred him from the facility, describing the situation as part of ongoing tensions between the two. In a deleted social media post, he wrote: “That Floyd’s petty ass said I couldn’t use his gym anymore. I don’t give a f---!”

On April 4, Davis claimed he had inside information from Garcia’s training camp, suggesting the existence of a “mole” or “snitch.” Davis indicated that this source had revealed details about Garcia being hurt during sparring, particularly to the body.

In the week leading up to the fight week, Davis and Garcia publicly agreed during an Instagram Live session, hosted by, influencer Kai Cenat to place bets with their entire fight purses on the outcome of their bout. Davis proposed a “winner takes all” arrangement, stating that the victor would receive both purses, and instructed his team to draw up a contract, while Garcia accepted the challenge. Garcia clarified comments regarding a proposed “winner‑takes‑all” purse bet with Davis, stating that the wager concerned their fight earnings rather than a misunderstanding over the term “purse", related to Davis's attire.

=== Re-hydration clause ===
Ahead of the bout, Garcia revealed that his contract included a rehydration clause requiring him to weigh no more than 146 pounds on fight night, 10 pounds above the agreed catchweight of 136 pounds. Garcia stated that the restriction would not affect his performance, while De La Hoya described the clause as standard and had no concerns.

Garcia accepted major contractual concessions in order to finalize the fight. These included the one-sided rematch clause, the 136-pound catchweight and the 10-pound rehydration clause. He stated the compromises were necessary in order to secure the career-defining fight and to deliver an important boxing event.

Despite accepting the terms of the weight and rehydration, Garcia was still critical. He suggested the conditions prevented him from performing at his optimal weight, saying, “No integrity. No will to fight the best. No will to get the best version of me…” He also said he made these sacrifices for the fans, “I didn’t put myself first. I put the boxing fans first.” Davis explained that he wanted the fight close to his natural division (lightweight). “I wanted the fight to be at 135 pounds. That’s my weight class.” He rejected the idea of fighting Garcia at a higher weight due to the size difference, stating, “Why would I fight him at 140 if he’s bigger than me? That don’t make no sense.”

Some in the boxing world criticized Davis for applying clauses that would restrict Garcia’s physical advantages and potentially give Davis an edge. Davis dismissed the criticism, saying “He’s a bigger fighter and he’s only growing… Why would I not have a rehydration clause in there?” He then suggested that Garcia would rehydrate significantly above the weight limit up to 160 pounds. Garcia previously stated that his 'walk-around' weight between fights was around 148 pounds.

During fight week, De La Hoya again criticized the contractual terms for the bout, including the 136‑pound catchweight and rehydration clause. He described the conditions as “petty requirements” that suggested Davis’ team was seeking to protect their fighter, questioning whether they believed he was “ready for this moment.”

=== Reaction ===
As the fight was first announced and throughout the build up, past and present boxers and analysts expressed mixed reactions. Teofimo Lopez described the matchup as a “50-50 fight” and said it was “great for the sport of boxing,” praising both fighters for helping make a major contest between elite names. Frank Martin also viewed the bout as a significant fight, but favoured Davis to win by knockout, citing Garcia’s tendency to slow down after the early rounds. Andre Ward likewise favoured Davis, stating that “you got to favour Tank” because of his greater experience, stronger opposition, punching power, and overall boxing ability. He mentioned Garcia’s speed and explosiveness as factors that could make the contest competitive.

Shakur Stevenson initially stated that Davis would likely use “smarter tactics” against Garcia, and later said that Davis was “way too much” for him and that Garcia was “not on that level.” Trainer Robert Garcia, by contrast, favored Garcia, stating that he was “too fast and too strong.” Timothy Bradley, who reacted much more emotionally, also supported Garcia, saying that he hoped Garcia would knock Davis out, due to his disapproval of Davis’ conduct outside the ring. Adrien Broner strongly favoured Davis, stating that he was “favoring Tank a lot” and arguing that Davis’ defence and adaptability would allow him to “get the job done.” Óscar Valdez backed Garcia, stating “I got Ryan” and describing him as “legit,” while mentioning Garcia’s speed and power as reasons he was “leaning towards Ryan.”

Vasiliy Lomachenko predicted that Davis would “finish” Garcia, mentioning Davis’ technique, speed, power and experience, and later added that the bout’s rehydration clause was “one more thing” that favored Davis, while also describing Garcia as “very big for 135” and overly reliant on his left hook. William Zepeda described the contest as a “50/50 fight” but leaned slightly towards Garcia, stating that if Garcia used his height and connected cleanly, he did not believe Davis would be able to handle Garcia’s power well enough to win.

== Officials ==
During fight week, the Nevada State Athletic Commission confirmed Tim Cheatham, Dave Moretti, and Steve Weisfeld as judges, with Thomas Taylor, who was noted for his reputation as capable and effective, serving as referee. All three judges had prior experience officiating major title fights. Moretti had judged multiple Davis fights, including his recent win over Héctor Luis García. Weisfeld and Cheatham had limited involvement with Garcia, and never scored any of his fights that went the distance. Due to the fighters’ high knockout percentages, the bout was widely expected to be decided inside the distance rather than by judges’ scorecards.

Judges
Tim Cheatham	Nevada
Dave Moretti	Nevada
Steve Weisfeld	New Jersey
Referee
Thomas Taylor	California

== Weigh in ==
The weigh-in took place in front of a large crowd outside the T-Mobile arena. The contracted catchweight was set at 136 pounds with both fighters coming in under this limit during the first-day weigh-in. Davis weighed 135¼ pounds and Garcia, weighed slightly more at 135½ pounds. There was a brief altercation during the face-off, where Davis lightly pushed Garcia before officials separated them.

The second day weigh-in took place at 11 a.m. PDT on the morning of the fight, which was closed to the public. Both were required to adhere to a 146‑pound limit. Davis and Garcia both satisfied a contractual second-day weigh-in requirement, weighing 144.1 pounds and 144.9 pounds respectively. It was reported that six-figure fines were in place had either boxer not made the weight successfully.

=== Undercard weigh‑in results ===
- David Morrell Jr. — 167¾ lbs vs. Yamaguchi Falcao — 166½ lbs
- Bektemir Melikuziev — 167¼ lbs vs. Gabriel Rosado — 167¼ lbs
- Elijah Garcia — 159¼ lbs vs. Kevin Salgado — 159¼ lbs

== Fight details ==
In one of boxing's most anticipated fights of the year, Davis defeated Garcia via seventh-round knockout, with a decisive body shot. From the beginning, Garcia started aggressively, using right hands and hooks to back up Davis. The first round was largely an exploratory round, with both fighters working on distance and timing. In the second round, Garcia overextended with a left hook, allowing Davis to slip the punch and counter with a hard left hook, dropping Garcia. Despite beating the count, Garcia’s momentum slowed down, and he adopted a more cautious approach in the middle rounds. Between the third and sixth rounds, both exchanged jabs and body shots, with Davis targeting Garcia’s body, strategically to slow him down. Garcia regained some confidence in the sixth and landed several rights to Davis’ face, but Davis maintained composure. In the seventh round, Davis landed a powerful left hand to the body, causing Garcia to take a knee. He attempted to rise but, visibly in pain and struggling to breathe, could not continue. Referee Thomas Taylor counted him out at 1:44 of the round, resulting in a seventh-round knockout win for Davis. This marked Davis’ 29th professional win and 27th knockout, while Garcia suffered the first loss of his career, dropping to 23–1. At the time of stoppage, Davis was comfortably ahead on all 3 judges scorecards with scores 59–55 (twice) and 58–56.

=== Post-fight ===
After the stoppage, Davis stated that Garcia’s body language convinced him the fight was over even before the count was completed. He said: “I didn’t think it was over, but I seen his face. That’s what made me think it was over.” Davis also described the moment Garcia looked at him while on one knee: “When he was looking at me, I was looking at him like, trying to tell him, ‘Get up.’ And then he just shook his head no.” Davis also declared that he was the "face of boxing."

=== CompuBox stats ===
According to CompuBox punch stats, Davis landed 35 of 103 punches thrown (34%) and Garcia landed 39 of his 163 thrown (24%). 18 of the shots landed from Davis were body shots, showing that he targeted the body, ultimately getting the stoppage win, via a body shot.

Fighter	Total punches	Total Jabs	Power punches
Davis	35/103	5/40	30/63
Davis	(34%)	(12.5%)	47.6%
Garcia	39/163	15/106	24/57
Garcia	(24%)	14.2%	42.1%

== Official scorecards ==
Judge	Fighter	1	2	3	4	5	6	7	8	9	10	11	12	Total
Tim Cheatham	Davis	9	10	10	10	10	9	-	-	-	-	-	-	58
Tim Cheatham	Garcia	10	10	9	9	9	10	-	-	-	-	-	-	57
Dave Moretti	Davis	10	10	9	10	10	10	-	-	-	-	-	-	59
Dave Moretti	Garcia	9	10	10	9	9	9	-	-	-	-	-	-	56
Steve Weisfeld	Davis	9	10	10	10	10	10	-	-	-	-	-	-	59
Steve Weisfeld	Garcia	10	9	9	9	9	9	-	-	-	-	-	-	55

== Aftermath ==
Speaking at the post-fight press conference, Garcia stated that he believed he had Davis “pretty hurt” in the second round, but admitted that he became “impatient” and was caught by a counter left hand. Garcia later said that he “started getting bored” and abandoned a more disciplined game plan, which contributed to the defeat. He admitted that Davis’ body shot finish had “took the air out” of him, and hoped that he could earn a rematch in the future, stating that he would first need to “pile up some wins.” Two years later, he was still hopeful that he would have a rematch with Davis.

Garcia posted on Instagram that there had been a “mole” in his training camp who had leaked information ahead of the fight. Garcia said he was shocked that “someone close” to him had crossed him, but stated that he was not using it as an excuse for the defeat. Erdenebat Tsendbaatar became the most discussed name in the aftermath of the fight after a social media video circulated in which he said he had hurt Garcia with a body shot during sparring, but he publicly denied leaking information to Davis or his team.

Both De La Hoya and Bernard Hopkins were absent from the post-fight press conference. De La Hoya stated that he had missed it after receiving "death threats" during fight week, and claimed that Hopkins had been barred from further involvement following an incident at the weigh-in event. The incident he was referring to was when Hopkins touched Davis from behind during a face-off sequence, after which online accusations circulated that Hopkins might have rubbed a banned substance on Davis. De La Hoya rejected that suggestion and said Hopkins had only tried to stop Davis from falling off the stage. Floyd Mayweather later commented on De La Hoya’s absence, stating that “we all approach situations in a different way,” but added that he would have stood by Davis “through the good, the bad and the ugly.”

WBC president Mauricio Sulaimán had his say on how the fight unfolded and criticised the official scoring of the second round, in which Davis scored a knockdown but was not awarded a 10–8 round on any of the three scorecards. Sulaimán stated that he “can’t simply understand” how the round had been scored 10–9 twice and 10–10 once, arguing that the knockdown had been a decisive moment that “must be recognized in the scores.” Although critical of the scoring, Sulaimán did note that Garcia had boxed well early in the fight, including part of the second round before being dropped.

Henry Garcia, the father and trainer of Ryan, stated that a potential rematch with Davis would only take place at the super lightweight limit of 140 pounds and without a rehydration clause. Garcia’s team maintained that the original fight conditions had adversely affected his performance, and indicated that any future rematch would require standard weight rules to ensure competitive balance.

Following the bout, reactions from boxing figures were mixed, with many praising Davis’ timing and accuracy, while others criticized Garcia’s failure to continue after being knocked down. Some commentators described the stoppage as a legitimate result of the body shot, while others suggested Garcia had effectively quit, leading to debate within the boxing community regarding the nature of the finish.

Bernard Hopkins stated that the catchweight and rehydration clause used in the bout did not play a significant role in Garcia’s defeat. Hopkins argued that Garcia appeared physically strong at the weigh-in and instead attributed the loss to Davis’ effective body attack, including the decisive shot that ended the fight. He also suggested that the punch may have landed on an already weakened area.

== Reception ==
The fight reportedly sold over 1.2 million PPV buys on Showtime at a cost of $84.99. It also generated approximately $22.8 million from ticket sales. The fight took place in front of a sell-out crowd of 20,842 fans, with additional money earned from sponsorships and advertising. The gate was ranked the 5th highest in Nevada boxing history, at the time.

De La Hoya commented on the commercial success of the bout, stating that the figures showed that fans would support major fights when promoters cooperated to make them. He also discussed the possibility of a rematch, noting that it would not happen immediately as both fighters were expected to pursue separate paths. However, he predicted that a future rematch could generate approximately four million pay-per-view buys.

== Fight card ==
Weight class		vs.		Method	Round	Time	Notes
Catchweight (136 lbs)	Gervonta Davis (c)	def.	Ryan Garcia (c)	KO	7/12	1:44	For WBA (Regular) and WBC interim lightweight titles
Super Middleweight	David Morrell (c)	def.	Yamaguchi Falcão	KO	1/12	2:36	For WBA (Regular) super middleweight title.
Super Middleweight	Bektemir Melikuziev	def.	Gabriel Rosado	UD	10/10
Middleweight	Elijah Garcia	def.	Kevin Salgado	UD	10/10		Salgado was deducted 1 point in Round 7 due to a low blow.
Middleweight	Fiodor Czerkaszyn	def.	Elias Espadas	TKO	9/10	2:07
Light Middleweight	Vito Mielnicki Jr.	def.	José Charles	KO	4/10	0:33
Lightweight	Floyd Schofield	def.	Jesus Valentin Leon	TKO	2/10	1:51
Middleweight	Lorenzo Simpson	def.	Pachino Hill	UD	6/6
Light Middleweight	Jalil Hackett	def.	Jason Phillips	TKO	3/4	2:20
Bantamweight	Cuttino Oliver	def.	Roberto Cantu Pena	TKO	2/4	3:00

== Broadcasting ==
Country/Region	Broadcasters			
Country/Region	Free	Cable TV	PPV	Stream
United States (Host)	—N/a		Showtime	
United States (Host)	—N/a		DAZN PPV	
Australia	—N/a		DAZN PPV	
New Zealand	—N/a		DAZN PPV	
Canada	—N/a		DAZN PPV	
Canada	—N/a		FITE^{1}	
Germany	—N/a		FITE^{1}	
Italy	—N/a		FITE^{1}	
Europe	—N/a			DAZN^{2}
Europe	—N/a	Fight Sports	Fight Sports Max	
Pan Asia (inc. Indian subcontinent and exc. Japan)	—N/a	Fight Sports	Fight Sports Max	
MENA	—N/a	Fight Sports	Fight Sports Max	
France	—N/a	RMC Sport	—N/a	RMC BFM Play
Japan	—N/a	Wowow	—N/a	Wowow on Demand
Kazakhstan	Qazsport	—N/a	—N/a	Qazsport
Latin America	—N/a	ESPN	—N/a	Star+
Mexico	Azteca 7	—N/a		TV Azteca Deportes
Panama	Telemetro	—N/a		Medcom Go
Thailand	—N/a	PPTV HD	—N/a	
Sub-saharan Africa	—N/a	SuperSport	—N/a	DStv Play

^{1}Also available in New Zealand

^{2}Davis vs. Garcia on DAZN coverage only Available in Belgium, Bulgaria, Denmark, Estonia, Finland, Iceland, Ireland, Latvia, Lithuania, Netherlands, Norway, Poland, Portugal, Sweden, and the United Kingdom
