= Jake Paul vs. Nate Diaz =

2023 professional crossover boxing match

Ready 4 War
- Date: August 5, 2023
- Venue: American Airlines Center, Dallas, Texas, U.S.

Tale of the tape
Boxer	Jake Paul	Nate Diaz
Nickname	The Problem Child	
Hometown	Cleveland, Ohio, U.S.	Stockton, California, U.S.
Pre-fight record	6–1 (4 KOs)	0–0 (Boxing); 21–13 (5 KOs) (MMA)
Age	26	38
Height	6 ft 1 in (1.85 m)	6 ft 0 in (1.83 m)
Weight	185 lb (84 kg)	185 lb (84 kg)
Style	Orthodox	Southpaw

Result
- Paul wins by unanimous decision in 10 rounds (98–91, 98–91, 97–92)

Jake Paul vs. Nate Diaz, billed as Ready 4 War, was a professional boxing crossover match contested at cruiserweight between American YouTuber-turned-boxer Jake Paul and American mixed martial artist Nate Diaz. The bout took place at the American Airlines Center in Dallas, Texas on August 5, 2023. The fight sold 450,000 PPV buys and generated about $27 million in revenue. It also generated $3.1 million from ticket sales.

== Background ==
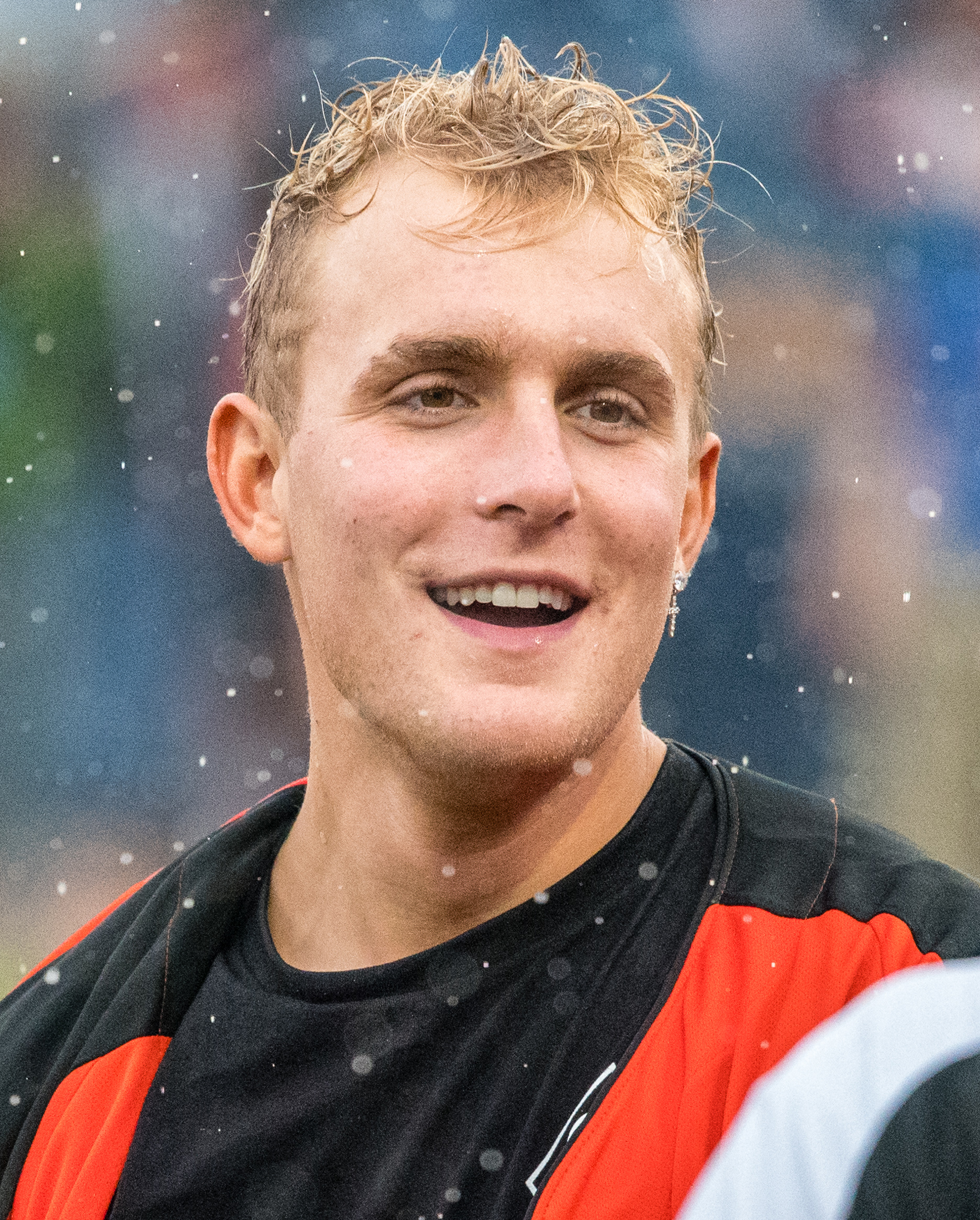
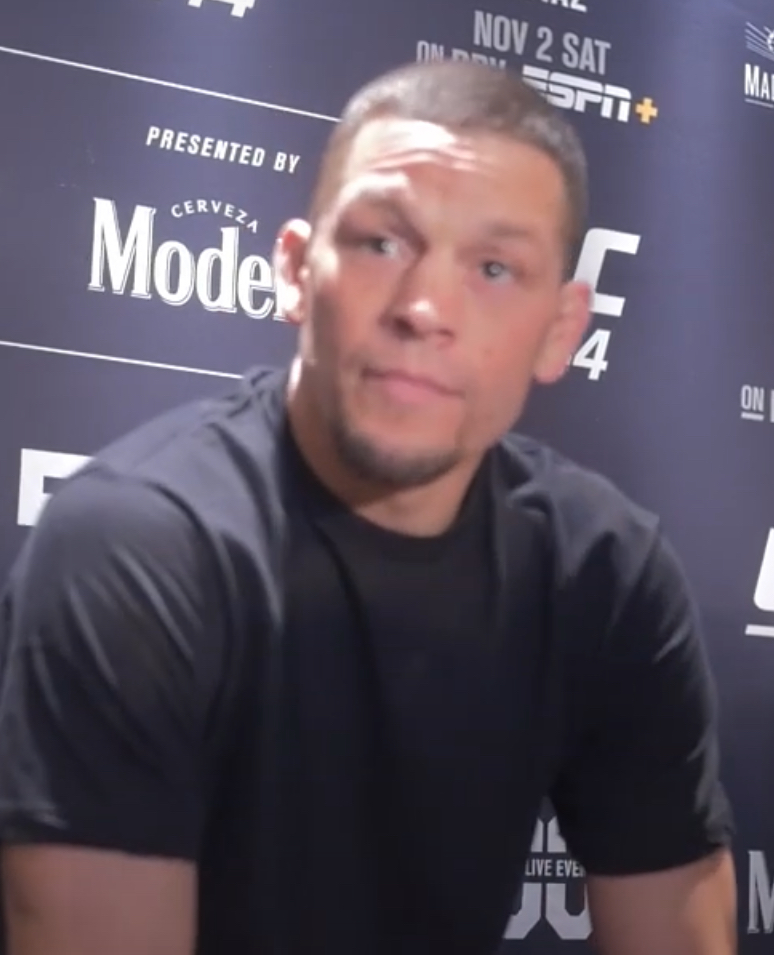
Jake Paul (left) and Nate Diaz (right).

After Tommy Fury defeated Jake Paul in February 2023 in Saudi Arabia, both Paul and Fury expressed interest in an immediate rematch. In March however, reports stated that Paul and his team were planning on having a bout with Floyd Mayweather Jr. and KSI before they rematch Fury.

On April 12, it was announced that Paul would return to the ring against mixed martial arts fighter Nate Diaz in an eight-round bout which would mark the latter's professional boxing debut. In June, it was announced that the bout would be increased to 10 rounds after both parties agreed to the change of terms via social media. The bout was fought in a catchweight of 185 lbs, with 10-ounce gloves.

This event was produced by Jake Paul's company "Most Valuable Promotions" and Nate Diaz's company "Real Fight Inc.". Boxers from Diaz's camp and team included Alan Sanchez, Kilo Madera, Luciano Ramos, Jose Aguayo and Chris Avila.

== Fight card ==
Weight Class		vs.		Method	Round	Time	Notes
Main Card (PPV)
Catchweight	Jake Paul	def.	Nate Diaz	UD	10/10		^{Note 1}
Featherweight	Amanda Serrano (c)	def.	Heather Hardy	UD	10/10		^{Note 2}
Super Middleweight	Chris Avila	def.	Jeremy Stephens	UD	6/6		^{Note 3}
Super Lightweight	Ashton Sylve	def.	William Silva	KO	4/8	2:59
Super Middleweight	Shadasia Green	def.	Olivia Curry	UD	10/10
Welterweight	Alan Sanchez	def.	Angel Beltran	UD	8/8
Super Welterweight	Kevin Newman II	def.	Kilo Madera	UD	8/8
Welterweight	Jose Aguayo	def.	Noel Cavazos	MD	4/4
Super Lightweight	Luciano Ramos	vs.	CJ Hamilton	UD	4/4

^Note 1 Diaz's professional debut
^Note 2 For IBF, IBO, WBA, WBC, and WBO undisputed featherweight titles
^ Note 3 Avila missed weight (170lbs) and was fined a percentage of his purse

== Broadcasting ==
Country/Region	Broadcasters	
Country/Region	PPV	Stream
Worldwide	DAZN	
Worldwide	FITE	
Australia	Main Event	
New Zealand	Sky Arena	
