= Ashton Sylve =

American boxer (born 2004)

Personal information
- Nickname: H2O
- Born: 28 January 2004 (age 22) Long Beach, California, United States
- Height: 5 ft 8 in (173 cm)
- Weight: Lightweight

Boxing career
- Reach: 68 in (173 cm)
- Stance: Orthodox

Boxing record
- Total fights: 15
- Wins: 14
- Win by KO: 10
- Losses: 1
- No contests: 0

Ashton Sylve (born January 28, 2004) is an American professional boxer who currently competes in the lightweight division. Known by his ring name H2O, he is currently signed to KSI's Misfits Boxing Pro stable.

== Professional career ==
Sylve made his professional debut on October 31, 2020 at the age of 16. He faced Gerardo Yescas. Sylve won the fight via a fourth-round TKO.

=== Most Valuable Promotions ===
After racking up a record of 7–0, Sylve joined Jake Paul's boxing promotion Most Valuable Promotions. His first fight with the promotion came on October 29, 2022 on the Jake Paul vs. Anderson Silva undercard. He faced Braulio Rodriguez. Sylve won the fight via a first-round knockout.

His next fight came seven months later in the main event of the first "Prospects" event. He faced Tanzania's Adam Kipenga. Sylve won the fight via Unanimous Decision.

His next fight came three months later on the Jake Paul vs. Nate Diaz undercard against William Silva. Sylve won the fight via a fourth-round TKO.

He returned six months later in the main event of "Most Valuable Prospects V" against Brazil's Estivan Falcao. Sylve won the fight via Unanimous Decision.

His next fight came five months later on the Jake Paul vs. Mike Perry undercard. He faced Lucas Bahdi. Sylve lost this fight via a sixth-round knockout, and thus losing his undefeated status and dropping to 11–1.

On August 5, 2025, it was announced via social media that Sylve has been released from the promotion in a controversial manner. Sylve broke his silence a day later, and released a statement via his own social media, claiming that he that the promotion cut all contacts with him and accused them of mishandling his departure as well as failing to set up a rematch against Bahdi. MVP then released their own statement contradicting Sylve's claims, stating that "Ashton was never signed under any promotional agreement with MVP, nor was there an exclusive arrangement in place. Our previous relationship was advisory in nature, and Ashton, on multiple occasions, pursued opportunities with other boxing organizations."

=== Misfits Boxing ===
On October 19, 2025, it was announced that Sylve had signed with KSI's promotion Misfits Boxing as part of their MF Pro division. His first fight with the promotion came on November 9, 2025 on the undercard of MF Duel. He defeated Daniel Lugo (6–3) in the technical knockout in the fifth round. In April 2026, Sylve made his United Kingdom debut on the Derek Chisora vs. Deontay Wilder undercard against Raul Antonio Galaviz Hernandez (15–4–2), in which he defeated via unanimous decision.

==== Sylve vs. Diaz ====
On June 19, 2026, Sylve defeated former IBF super lightweight champion Joseph Diaz via unanimous decision. The bout took place as the headliner for MF Pro's inaugural United States event at Thunder Studios in Long Beach, California.

== Professional boxing record ==
15 fights	14 wins	1 loss
By knockout	10	1
By decision	4	0

No.	Result	Record	Opponent	Type	Round, time	Date	Location	Notes
15	Win	14–1	Joseph Diaz	UD	10	Jun 19, 2026	Thunder Studios, Long Beach, California, U.S.	
14	Win	13–1	Raul Antonio Galaviz Hernandez	UD	8	Apr 4, 2026	The O2 Arena, London, England	
13	Win	12–1	Daniel Lugo	TKO	5 (8), 2:34	Nov 9, 2025	Nashville Municipal Auditorium, Nashville, Tennessee, U.S.	
12	Loss	11–1	Lucas Bahdi	KO	6 (10), 2:27	Jul 20, 2024	Amalie Arena, Tampa, Florida, U.S.	
11	Win	11–0	Estivan Falcao	UD	10	Feb 2, 2024	Caribe Royale, Orlando, Florida, U.S.	
10	Win	10–0	William Silva	TKO	4 (8), 2:59	Aug 5, 2023	American Airlines Center, Dallas, Texas, U.S.	
9	Win	9–0	Adam Kipenga	UD	8	May 26, 2023	Caribe Royale, Orlando, Florida, U.S.	
8	Win	8–0	Braulio Rodriguez	KO	1 (8), 1:01	Oct 29, 2022	Desert Diamond Arena, Glendale, Arizona, U.S.	
7	Win	7–0	Giovanni Gutierrez	KO	1 (8), 2:34	May 21, 2022	Long Beach Convention and Entertainment Center, Long Beach, California, U.S.	
6	Win	6–0	Aldimar Silva	KO	2 (6), 0:32	Feb 26, 2022	Finish Line Sports Grill, Pomona, California, U.S.	
5	Win	5–0	Cristian Giovanni Vizcarra Hernandez	KO	2 (6), 0:30	Sep 25, 2021	Big Punch Arena, Tijuana, Mexico	
4	Win	4–0	Martin Robles Salazar	KO	1 (6), 2:04	Aug 28, 2021	Big Punch Arena, Tijuana, Mexico	
3	Win	3–0	Enrique Castro	TKO	4 (6), 1:34	Jan 30, 2021	Big Punch Arena, Tijuana, Mexico	
2	Win	2–0	Saul Garcia Espino	KO	1 (6), 2:25	Dec 9, 2020	Estadio Chevron, Tijuana, Mexico	
1	Win	1–0	Gerardo Yescas	TKO	4 (6), 1:15	Oct 31, 2020	Estadio Chevron, Tijuana, Mexico	
