= Anthony Taylor (fighter) =

American professional boxer

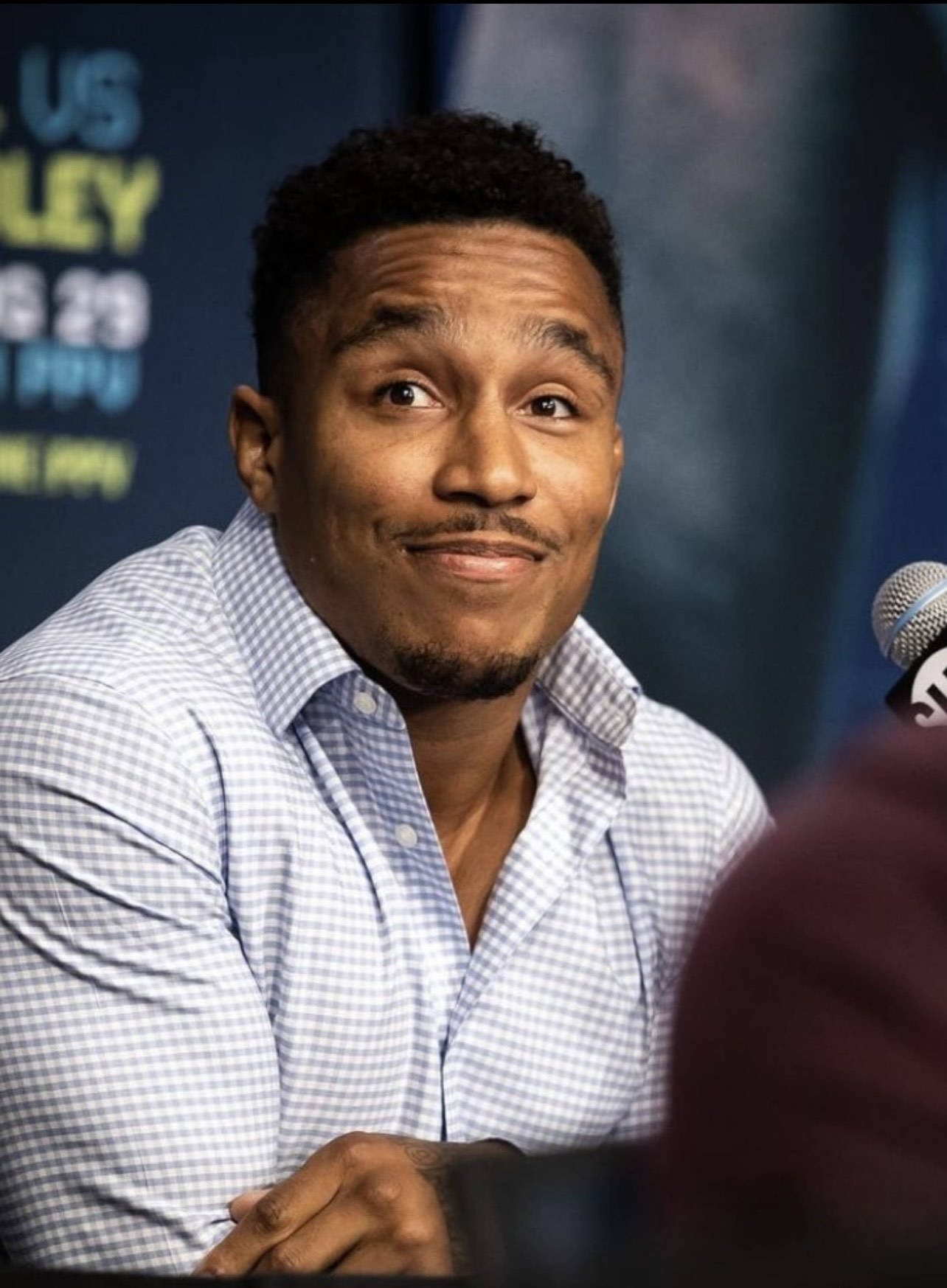
- Taylor in 2022
- Born: Anthony Taylor; 23 June 1989 (age 37); Berkeley, California, United States
- Other names: Pretty Boy, goAT
- Height: 170 cm (5 ft 7 in)
- Reach: 169 cm (66.5 in)
- Style: Freestyle, boxing

Professional boxing record
- Total: 15
- Wins: 7
- By knockout: 3
- Losses: 8
- By knockout: 1

Mixed martial arts record
- Total: 12
- Wins: 7
- Losses: 5

Other information
- Boxing record from BoxRec
- Mixed martial arts record from Sherdog

Anthony Taylor (born 23 June 1989), known by the ring name Pretty Boy, is an American former boxer and mixed martial artist. He is best known for his time in Misfits Boxing and Bellator. He has an overall professional record in boxing of 7 wins and 8 losses bringing his total MMA and boxing statistics to 27 fights, 14 wins, and 13 losses.

== Mixed martial arts career ==
Taylor made his professional MMA debut in 2015 against Adin Duenas at Bellator 147 losing via rear naked choke following a rocky amateur career of 5 wins and 8 losses. Winning only one fight in four following his debut, he was subsequently dropped by Bellator and joined CFC (Cage Fighting Championships) in 2017. He won his first fight for the promotion via decision against Trey Branch. Losing twice again he joined BAMMA in 2018 where he fought twice, winning both bouts, before being resigned by Bellator where he faced and beat Chris Avila.

After a 5-year hiatus, Taylor was set to make his MMA return against Dillon Danis as the co-feature bout on the Misfits Mania – The Fight Before Christmas boxing card. The bout will take place on December 20, 2025, at the Dubai Duty Free Tennis Stadium in Dubai, UAE for the MF MMA light heavyweight title. However, the bout was cancelled following Danis' withdrawal, after not being medically cleared due to his altercation at UFC 322.

== Boxing career ==
=== Taylor vs. Fury ===
Taylor retired from professional MMA in 2020 to pursue a move to professional boxing. Taylor return to the ring after to four years to face English boxer Tommy Fury (6–0) at the Rocket Arena in Cleveland, Ohio on August 29, 2021. The bout took place on the Jake Paul vs. Tyron Woodley undercard in which Fury defeated Taylor via unanimous decision.

=== Taylor vs. Avila II ===
Four months later, Taylor fought American mixed martial artist Chris Avila after obtaining two wins in Tijuana, Mexico. Taylor and Avila had previously fought before, the first time as an MMA bout at Bellator 238, in which Taylor won. The bout took place at the Amalie Arena in Tampa, Florida on the Jake Paul vs. Tyron Woodley II undercard on December 18, and saw Avila defeat Taylor via majority decision.

A year later, Taylor fought English musician Ashley Rak-Su from the Rak-Su boyband, on the MF & DAZN: X Series 002 undercard. The bout took place on October 15, 2022, at the Utilita Arena Sheffield in Sheffield, England. Taylor defeated Rak-Su via unanimous decision.

On December 6, 2022, Taylor's most challenging matchup was announced for MF & DAZN: X Series 004, being English boxer Idris Virgo (12–0–1). The bout took place on January 14, 2023, at Wembley Arena in London, England, in which Virgo defeated Taylor via unanimous decision.

=== Taylor vs. Papi ===
On April 13, Taylor vs Filipino influencer Salt Papi was announced for MF & DAZN: X Series 007 for May 13 at Wembley Arena in London, England. Taylor defeated Papi via unanimous decision and was awarded Prime Fighter of the Night.

=== MFB light heavyweight championship ===
==== Cancelled outnumbered bout with KSI ====
On June 8, 2024, KSI uploaded a YouTube video challenging both Taylor and American YouTuber Slim Albaher to a 2 vs. 1 outnumbered tag team match, after negotiations to face former unified light welterweight champion Amir Khan failed. Taylor accepted the challenge on Twitter. On June 30, the bout between KSI, Taylor, and Albaher was made official, and was set to take place as the headliner for MF & DAZN: X Series 17 at 3Arena in Dublin, Ireland. However, fans began to speculate if the bout had been cancelled following KSI deleting the bout announcement across his social media. On 1 August, KSI confirmed his withdrawal in a Twitter post due to an injury sustained.

==== Taylor vs. Ericsson ====
Following the cancellation of Taylor's outnumbered match, his next bout was announced to be against South Korean former kickboxer Samuel Ericsson. Originally, Ericsson was set to face to face American influencer OJ Rose, but was cancelled after Rose was arrested. The bout took place on MF & DAZN: X Series 16 at the James L. Knight Center in Miami, Florida. Taylor defeated Ericsson via technical knockout in the third round and retained his MFB title.

==== Taylor vs. Silva ====
Taylor was then rebooked for MF & DAZN: X Series 17, but this time against Brazilian mixed martial artist Gabriel Silva, serving as the co-main event alongside the new headliner, Danny Aarons vs Danny Simpson. Originally, Taylor and Silva were set to fight each other on MF & DAZN: X Series 13, but was cancelled following Silva's withdrawal. Taylor defeated Silva via technical knockout and retained his MFB title.

=== Taylor vs. Till ===
On December 6, Taylor's next bout was announced to be against former UFC welterweight challenger Darren Till, following the withdrawal of Fury as Till's original opponent. The bout took place as the headliner for MF & DAZN: X Series 20 at the Co-op Live in Manchester, England. Till defeated Taylor via technical knockout in the sixth round.

=== Taylor vs. Goyat ===
Following the cancellation of Taylor's MMA bout against Dillon Danis, Misfits announced on November 16 that Taylor would face Indian professional boxer Neeraj Goyat on the undercard of Misfits Mania – The Fight Before Christmas. This comes following Albaher's withdrawal from his bout with Goyat due to an injury. The bout took place on December 20 at the Dubai Duty Free Tennis Stadium in Dubai, UAE. Taylor lost to Goyat by unanimous decision.

=== Taylor vs. Floyd ===
On April 24, 2026, Misfits announced that Taylor would defend his MFB light heavyweight title against Australian former UBO light heavyweight world champion Matt Floyd, as the co-feature bout on Misfits 23 – Beauty vs. The Beast on June 13 at the Manchester Arena. In round 5 of the bout, Taylor began to complain that he could not see, and repeatedly hit the ground in frustration. The referee waved off the bout as a no contest, which resulted in Taylor charging towards Floyd. Taylor accused Floyd of using Tiger Balm, which resulted in the burning sensation in his eyes. Mams Taylor confirmed an investigation was underway with the commission. On 18 June, the World Combat Sports Federation notified Misfits that there was no foul play, thereby overturning the no contest to a disqualification victory to Floyd.

=== Taylor vs. AP the Fighter ===
Following his defeat to Floyd, Taylor announced that his next bout will take place on Adin Ross's boxing promotion Brand Risk Promotions against influencer AP the Fighter. The bout took place on August 22 at the Brand Risk Warehouse in Miami, Florida. AP defeated Taylor via unanimous decision, and Taylor subsequently announced his retirement from boxing in his post-fight interview.

== Personal life ==
Anthony Taylor grew up in Alameda, California. He graduated from Encinal High School. Before becoming a professional MMA fighter, Taylor made money as an Uber driver and male stripper. Prior to his professional boxing debut, Taylor was homeless.

== Boxing record ==
=== Professional ===
6 fights	2 wins	4 losses
By knockout	1	0
By decision	1	4

No.	Result	Record	Opponent	Type	Round, time	Date	Location	Notes
6	Loss	2–4	AP the Fighter	UD	3	Aug 22, 2026	Brand Risk Warehouse, Miami, Florida, U.S.	
5	Loss	2–3	Chris Avila	MD	8	Dec 18, 2021	Amalie Arena, Tampa, Florida, U.S.	
4	Win	2–2	Jose Camargo Cabanez	UD	4	Oct 16, 2021	Big Punch Arena, Tijuana, Mexico	
3	Win	1–2	Juan Manuel Rodriguez Chavez	TKO	2 (4) 2:11	Sep 25, 2021	Big Punch Arena, Tijuana, Mexico	
2	Loss	0–2	Tommy Fury	UD	4	Aug 29, 2021	Rocket Arena, Cleveland, Ohio, U.S.	
1	Loss	0–1	Donte Stubbs	SD	4	Jun 1, 2017	The Hangar, Costa Mesa, California, U.S.	

=== MF–Professional ===
9 fights	5 wins	4 losses
By knockout	2	1
By decision	3	2
By disqualification	0	1

No.	Result	Record	Opponent	Type	Round, time	Date	Location	Notes
9	Loss	5–4	Matt Floyd	DQ	5 (6), 0:58	Jun 13, 2026	Manchester Arena, Manchester, England	Lost MFB light heavyweight title Originally a TKO win for Floyd; overturned due to accusations of cheating from Taylor. On June 18, World Combat Sports Federation overturned the result to a disqualification win for Floyd after an investigation determined no foul play.
8	Loss	5–3	Neeraj Goyat	UD	6	Dec 20, 2025	Dubai Duty Free Tennis Stadium, Dubai, U.A.E.	
7	Loss	5–2	Darren Till	TKO	6 (8) 1:05	Jan 18, 2025	Co-op Live, Manchester, England	
6	Win	5–1	Gabriel Silva	TKO	3 (5) 2:54	Aug 31, 2024	3Arena, Dublin, Ireland	Retained MFB light heavyweight title
5	Win	4–1	Samuel Ericsson	TKO	2 (5) 2:52	Aug 10, 2024	James L. Knight Center, Miami, Florida, U.S.	Retained MFB light heavyweight title; On September 20, 2026, BoxRec updated the classification of the bout from BoxPro to MF–Pro.
4	Win	3–1	King Kenny	UD	5	Oct 14, 2023	AO Arena, Manchester, England	Won vacant MFB light heavyweight title
3	Win	2–1	Salt Papi	UD	3	May 13, 2023	Wembley Arena, London, England	
2	Loss	1–1	Idris Virgo	UD	4	Jan 14, 2023	Wembley Arena, London, England	
1	Win	1–0	Ashley Rak-Su	UD	3	Oct 15, 2022	Utilita Arena Sheffield, Sheffield, England	

=== Exhibition ===
4 fights	0 wins	2 losses
By decision	0	2
Draws	1	
Non-scored	1	

No.	Result	Record	Opponent	Type	Round, time	Date	Location	Notes
4	—N/a	0–2–1 (1)	Jack Fincham	—N/a	4	13 Nov 2022	Coca-Cola Arena, Dubai, UAE	Non-Scored bout
3	Draw	0–2–1	Ryan Taylor	MD	4	31 July 2022	P7 Arena, Dubai, UAE	
2	Loss	0–2	Drew Mournet	SD	3	June 11, 2022	Showboat Hotel, Atlantic City, New Jersey, U.S	
1	Loss	0–1	Jay Cucciniello	UD	4	March 5, 2022	Wembley Arena, London, England	

== Mixed martial arts record ==
Professional record breakdown
12 matches	7 wins	5 losses
By knockout	1	1
By submission	1	4
By decision	5	0

Res.	Record	Opponent	Method	Event	Date	Round	Time	Location	Notes
Win	7–5	Chris Avila	Decision (majority)	Bellator 238	January 25, 2020	3	5:00	Inglewood, California, United States	
Win	6–5	Brandon Faumui	Decision (split)	URCC: Rumble By The Bay	August 10, 2019	3	5:00	Daly City, California, United States	Catchweight (160 lb) bout. Won the vacant URCC MMA catchweight championship
Win	5–5	Ryan Reneau	Decision (unanimous)	Combate 36	May 10, 2019	3	5:00	Stockton, California, United States	
Win	4–5	Mike Hales	Decision (unanimous)	BAMMA Fight Night: London	June 28, 2018	3	5:00	London, England	Catchweight (150 lb) bout.
Win	3–5	Dean Barry	Submission (rear-naked choke)	BAMMA 35	May 12, 2018	2	0:39	Dublin, Ireland	
Loss	2–5	Adrian Guzman	Submission (rear-naked choke)	CFC 2: Champions Will Be Crowned	April 14, 2018	2	3:14	Sonora, California, United States	Lightweight debut. For the vacant CFC lightweight championship
Loss	2–4	Brian del Rosario	TKO (punches)	Celtic Gladiator 17	December 8, 2017	1	4:59	Burbank, California, United States	Catchweight (150 lb) bout.
Win	2–3	Trey Branch	Decision (unanimous)	CFC 1: King of the Mountain	November 18, 2017	3	5:00	Sonora, California, United States	
Loss	1–3	Ádám Borics	Submission (rear-naked choke)	Bellator 177	April 14, 2017	1	4:12	Budapest, Hungary	
Loss	1–2	James Gallagher	Submission (rear-naked choke)	Bellator 169	December 16, 2016	3	1:52	Dublin, Ireland	
Win	1–1	Victor Jones	KO (punches)	Bellator 154	May 14, 2016	1	0:27	San Jose, California, United States	
Loss	0–1	Adin Duenas	Submission (rear-naked choke)	Bellator 147	December 4, 2015	1	2:43	San Jose, California, United States	Featherweight debut.
