= Chris Avila =

American mixed martial artist and boxer

- Born: January 14, 1993 (age 33); Stockton, California, U.S.
- Height: 5 ft 10 in (178 cm)
- Weight: 170 lb (77 kg; 12 st 2 lb)
- Division: Featherweight (2014–2018); Lightweight (2019–present); Welterweight (2016–2021)
- Reach: 73 in (185 cm)
- Stance: Orthodox
- Fighting out of: Stockton, California, U.S.
- Team: Cesar Gracie Jiu-Jitsu
- Years active: 2014–present

Professional boxing record
- Total: 8
- Wins: 6
- Losses: 2

Mixed martial arts record
- Total: 18
- Wins: 8
- By knockout: 5
- By submission: 2
- By decision: 1
- Losses: 10
- By decision: 10

Other information
- Mixed martial arts record from Sherdog

Chris Avila (born January 14, 1993) is an American mixed martial artist and professional boxer. He competed in the UFC, Bellator and WSOF during his MMA career and has competed in Misfits Boxing during his boxing career.

== Mixed martial arts career ==
=== Early career ===
Avila obtained a 5–2 record in the regionals and made an appearance in WSOF 16.

On July 5, 2016, Chris Avila signed with the UFC.

=== UFC ===
Chris Avila made his UFC debut on August 20, UFC 202, fought Artem Lobov losing by unanimous decision.

On November 5, 2016, Avila faced Enrique Barzola in UFC Fight Night 98 and lost a unanimous decision.

=== Bellator ===
Avila made his Bellator debut on December 14, 2018, at Bellator 212 against Brandon Pieper winning by submission in the first round.

On April 27, 2019, Avila fought against Brandon Faumui in Bellator 220 losing by a close split decision.

On January 25, 2020, Avila fought Anthony Taylor on Bellator 238 losing by a close majority decision.

=== Most Valuable Promotions ===
Avila faced Brandon Jenkins on May 16, 2026 at MVP MMA 1. He lost the fight by split decision.

== Boxing career ==
Avila made his professional boxing debut on September 6, 2014, against Vicente Guzman (0–4–1), to which he lost via unanimous decision after four rounds.

=== Avila vs. Taylor ===
Seven years later, Avila returned to the boxing ring and competed against fellow mixed martial arts Anthony Taylor, who had a (2–2) record as a professional. The pair had previously fought in MMA, with Avila having previously losing by majority decision at Bellator 238. The bout took place on December 18, 2021, at the Amalie Arena in Tampa, Florida on the Jake Paul vs. Tyron Woodley II undercard. Avila defeated Taylor via majority decision.

On October 29, 2022, Avila fought Russian YouTuber and family medicine physician Dr. Mikhail Varshavski, better known online as "Doctor Mike" at the Gila River Arena in Glendale, Arizona on the Jake Paul vs. Anderson Silva undercard. Avila defeated Varshavski via unanimous decision.

Six months later, Avila fought on the MF & DAZN: X Series 006 undercard against professional boxer Paul Bamba (5–2). The bout took place on April 21, 2023, at the XULA Convocation Center in New Orleans, Louisiana. Avila defeated Bamba via unanimous decision and was award with the Prime Fighter of the Night award.

=== Avila vs. Stephens ===
On August 5, 2023, Avila fought mixed martial artist Jeremy Stephens at the American Airlines Center in Dallas, Texas on the Jake Paul vs. Nate Diaz undercard as part of the Real Fighter Inc. roaster. Avila defeated Stephens via unanimous decision.

Seven months later, Avila fought bare-knuckle boxer Jake Bostwick on the MF & DAZN: X Series 13 undercard on March 23, 2024, at the Worldwide Stages in Spring Hill, Tennessee. During the night, the bout had to be postponed later in the evening due to a bomb threat that halted the event by the Tennessee Highway Patrol Bomb Squad. After a 78-minute delay, the event resumed. Avila defeated Bostwick via split decision.

=== Avila vs. Pettis ===
On April 12, 2024, Avila's next opponent was announced to be mixed martial artist Anthony Pettis on the Nate Diaz vs. Jorge Masvidal undercard. The bout was originally scheduled to take place on July 1 at the Kia Forum arena in Inglewood, California, but was postponed for unknown reasons. The bout was later rescheduled for July 6 and instead took place at the Honda Center in Anaheim, California. Avila defeated Pettis via unanimous decision.

=== Stake Pro Tournament ===
On August 20, 2024, it was announced that Avila would partake in a tournament hosted by Stake on X Series 18 – Stake Pro Tournament Card on September 14 at the Vertu Motors Arena in Newcastle upon Tyne, England. His first opponent in the semifinals was former UFC lightweight champion Benson Henderson with English professional boxer Idris Virgo (14–0–1) vs English influencer Fes Batista (2–1) in the other bracket. The winner would receive a cash price from Stake and the inaugural MF pro light heavyweight title. Henderson defeated Avila by unanimous decision and advanced to the finals, in which he lost to Virgo via unanimous decision.

After eleven months since his previous bout, Avila announced his return to the ring against professional boxer Airel Perez (7–0), set to take place on August 23, 2025, at the Caribe Royale hotel in Orlando, Florida as part of Most Valuable Promotions' "Fight Night" series.

== Boxing record ==
=== Professional ===
8 fights	6 wins	2 losses
By decision	6	2

No.	Result	Record	Opponent	Type	Round, Time	Date	Location	Notes
9	Loss	6–2	Ariel Perez	UD	6	Aug 23, 2025	Caribe Royale, Orlando, Florida, U.S.	
7	Win	6–1	Anthony Pettis	UD	6	Jul 6, 2024	Honda Center, Anaheim, California, U.S.	
6	Win	5–1	Jake Bostwick	SD	4	Mar 23, 2024	Worldwide Stages, Spring Hill, Tennessee, U.S.	
5	Win	4–1	Jeremy Stephens	UD	6	Aug 5, 2023	American Airlines Center, Dallas, Texas, U.S.	
4	Win	3–1	Paul Bamba	UD	4	Apr 21, 2023	XULA Convocation Center, New Orleans, Louisiana, U.S.	
3	Win	2–1	Dr. Mikhail Varshavski	UD	4	Oct 29, 2022	Gila River Arena, Glendale, Arizona, U.S.	
2	Win	1–1	Anthony Taylor	MD	8	Dec 18, 2021	Amalie Arena, Tampa, Florida, U.S.	
1	Loss	0–1	Vicente Guzman	UD	4	Sep 6, 2014	SOS Club, Modesto, California, U.S.	

=== MF–Professional ===
1 fight	0 wins	1 loss
By decision	0	1

No.	Result	Record	Opponent	Type	Round, Time	Date	Location	Notes
1	Loss	0–1	Benson Henderson	UD	5	Sep 14, 2024	Vertu Motors Arena, Newcastle upon Tyne, England	Stake pro tournament semifinal

== Mixed martial arts record ==
Professional record breakdown
18 matches	8 wins	10 losses
By knockout	5	0
By submission	2	0
By decision	1	10

Res.	Record	Opponent	Method	Event	Date	Round	Time	Location	Notes
Loss	8–10	Brandon Jenkins	Decision (split)	MVP MMA: Rousey vs. Carano	May 16, 2026	3	5:00	Inglewood, California, United States	Catchweight (165 lb) bout.
Win	8–9	Jon Kennedy	TKO (punches)	North Iowa Fights: Hatch vs. Ottow	July 31, 2021	1	1:53	Mason City, Iowa, United States	Catchweight (176 lb) bout.
Win	7–9	Jessy Ebrecht	KO (punches)	North Iowa Fights: Aguayo vs. Konkol	April 24, 2021	1	0:11	Mason City, Iowa, United States	Welterweight debut. Knockout of the Night.
Loss	6–9	Anthony Taylor	Decision (majority)	Bellator 238	January 25, 2020	3	5:00	Inglewood, California, United States	
Loss	6–8	Brandon Faumui	Decision (split)	Bellator 220	April 27, 2019	3	5:00	San Jose, California, United States	Catchweight (160 lb) bout.
Win	6–7	Brandon Pieper	Submission (rear-naked choke)	Bellator 212	December 14, 2018	1	3:44	Honolulu, Hawaii, United States	Lightweight debut.
Loss	5–7	Horacio Gutiérrez	Decision (unanimous)	Combate Americas: Mexico vs. USA	May 11, 2018	3	5:00	Tijuana, Mexico	Catchweight (149.4 lb) bout; Avila missed weight.
Loss	5–6	Jamall Emmers	Decision (unanimous)	Global Knockout 11	November 4, 2017	3	5:00	Jackson, California, United States	Catchweight (150 lb) bout.
Loss	5–5	Ricky Palacios	Decision (unanimous)	Combate Americas: Combate Clasico	July 27, 2017	3	5:00	Miami, Florida, United States	
Loss	5–4	Enrique Barzola	Decision (unanimous)	The Ultimate Fighter Latin America 3 Finale: dos Anjos vs. Ferguson	November 5, 2016	3	5:00	Mexico City, Mexico	
Loss	5–3	Artem Lobov	Decision (unanimous)	UFC 202	August 20, 2016	3	5:00	Las Vegas, Nevada, United States	
Win	5–2	Drake Boen	TKO (punches)	Global Knockout 6	March 26, 2016	2	0:45	Jackson, California, United States	
Win	4–2	Zach Zane	Submission (rear-naked choke)	Global Knockout 5	November 21, 2015	1	4:20	Jackson, California, United States	
Win	3–2	Adel Altamimi	KO (punch)	International FC: California Caged Combat	September 26, 2015	2	0:47	Clovis, California, United States	
Loss	2–2	Jason Powell	Decision (unanimous)	WSOF 16	December 13, 2014	3	5:00	Sacramento, California, United States	
Win	2–1	Mike Ryan	KO (punch)	Global Knockout 2	October 18, 2014	2	1:13	Jackson, California, United States	
Win	1–1	Beau Hamilton	Decision (unanimous)	West Coast FC 10	June 28, 2014	3	5:00	Placerville, California, United States	
Loss	0–1	Christian Buron	Decision (unanimous)	Art of War Productions: Yakuza Moon	January 18, 2014	3	3:00	Fresno, California, United States	Featherweight debut.
