= Jake Paul vs. Mike Perry =

2024 professional crossover boxing match

Fear No Man
- Date: July 20, 2024
- Venue: Amalie Arena, Tampa, Florida, U.S.
- Title(s) on the line: None

Tale of the tape
Boxer	(United States) Jake Paul	(United States) Mike Perry
Nickname	The Problem Child; El Gallo ("The Rooster")	Platinum
Hometown	Cleveland, Ohio, U.S.	Flint, Michigan, U.S.
Pre-fight record	9–1 (6 KO)	0–1 (Boxing); 14–8 (11 KO) (MMA); 5–0 (3 KO) (Bare-knuckle boxing)
Age	27 years, 6 months	32 years, 10 months
Height	6 ft 1 in (1.85 m)	5 ft 10 in (1.78 m)
Weight	200 lb (91 kg)	196.6 lb (89 kg)
Style	Orthodox	Orthodox
Recognition		BKFC "King of Violence" Champion

Result
- Paul wins via 6th-round TKO

Jake Paul vs. Mike Perry, billed as Fear No Man, was a cruiserweight professional crossover boxing match contested between American YouTuber-turned-professional boxer Jake Paul and American bare knuckle boxer and former mixed martial artist Mike Perry. The bout took place at the Amalie Arena in Tampa, Florida on July 20, 2024.

== Background ==
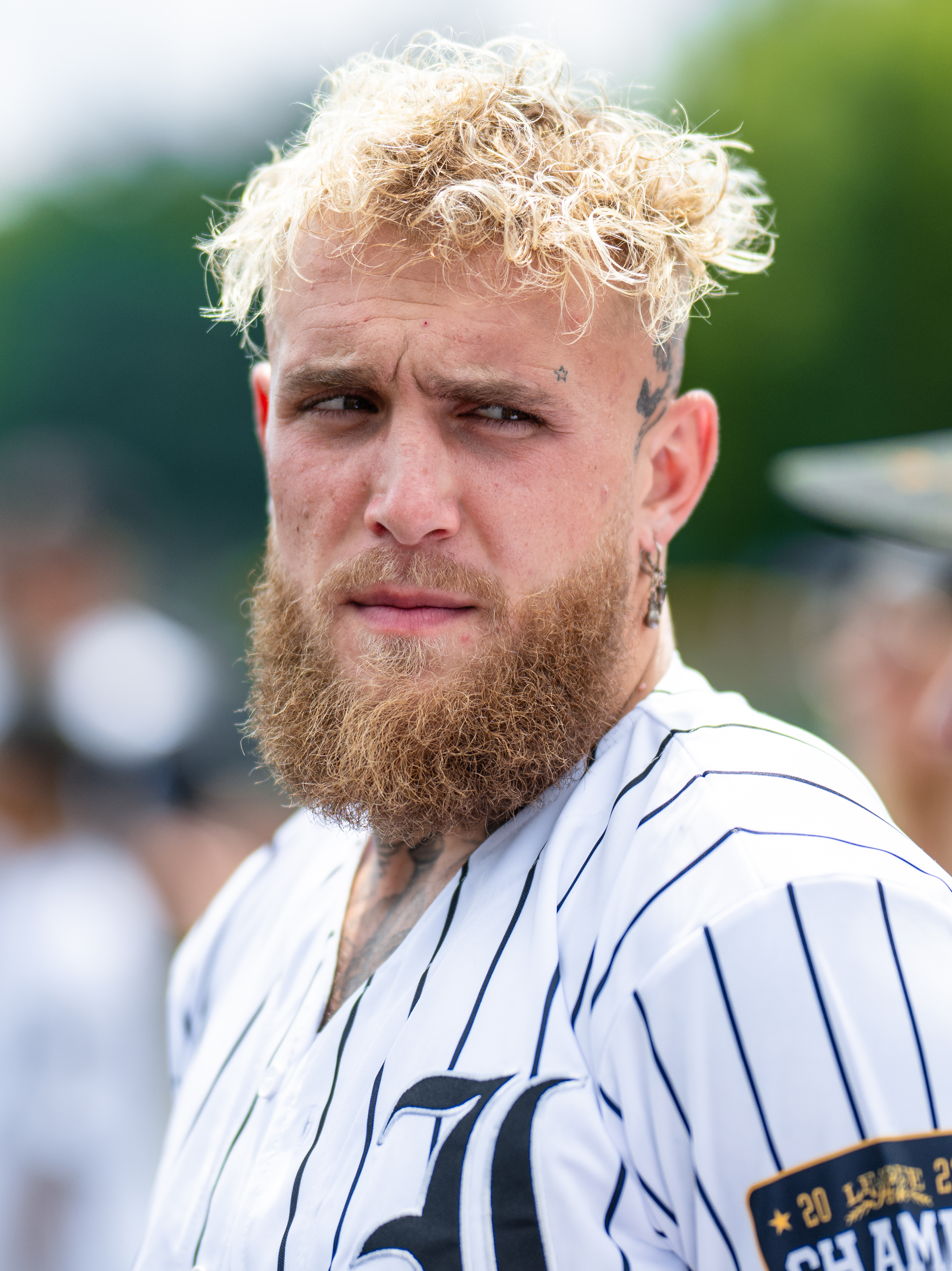
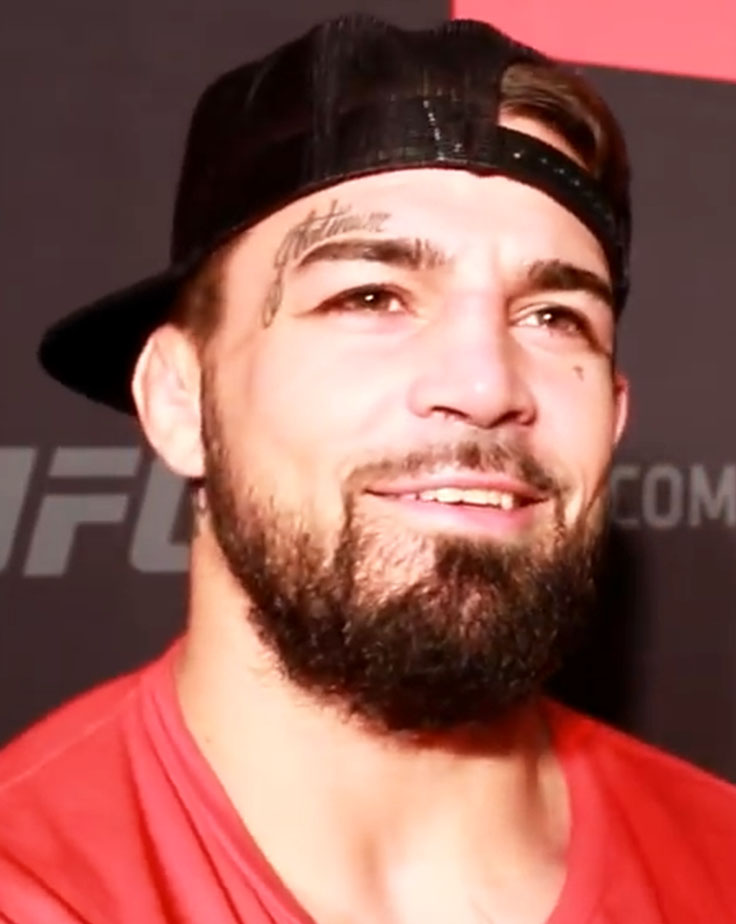
Jake Paul (left) and Mike Perry (right).

Originally, the card was expected to be headlined by a bout between Jake Paul and Mike Tyson, at the AT&T Stadium in Arlington, Texas. However the event were postponed due to medical conditions concerning Tyson. The match was rescheduled for November 15, 2024.

A super lightweight bout between unified women featherweight world champion Amanda Serrano and Stevie Morgan co-headlined the event.

Among the bouts featured on the undercard, Tony Aguilar and Corey Marksman II had an 8-round bout at lightweight.

== Aftermath ==
The fight between Paul and Tyson was later confirmed to take place on November 15, 2024, at the AT&T Stadium in Arlington, Texas.

After his loss against Jake Paul in the main event, Mike Perry was fired from the Bare Knuckle Fighting Championship by the promotion's co-owner Conor McGregor.

== Fight card ==
Weight Class		vs.		Method	Round	Time	Notes
Main Card (PPV)
Cruiserweight	Jake Paul	def.	Mike Perry	TKO	6/8	1:12
Featherweight	Amanda Serrano	def.	Stevie Morgan	TKO	2/10	0:38
Super Lightweight	Lucas Bahdi	def.	Ashton Sylve	KO	6/10	2:26
Lightweight	Corey Marksman	def.	Tony Aguilar	UD	8/8	3:00
Middleweight	Julio César Chávez Jr.	def.	Uriah Hall	UD	6/6	3:00
Super Middleweight	Shadasia Green	def.	Natasha Spence	UD	8/8	3:00
Middleweight	Alexis Chaparro	def.	Kevin Hill	KO	2/6	2:01
Super Bantamweight	Angel Barrientes	def.	Edwin Rodríguez	UD	6/6
Light Heavyweight	Ariel Perez	def.	Dane Guerrero	KO	3/4

== Broadcasting ==
Country/Region	Broadcasters	
Country/Region	PPV	Stream
Worldwide	DAZN	
Worldwide	FITE	
Australia	Main Event	
New Zealand	Sky Arena	
