= Doctor Mike =

American celebrity doctor (born 1989)

Mikhail Varshavski
- Михаил Варшавский
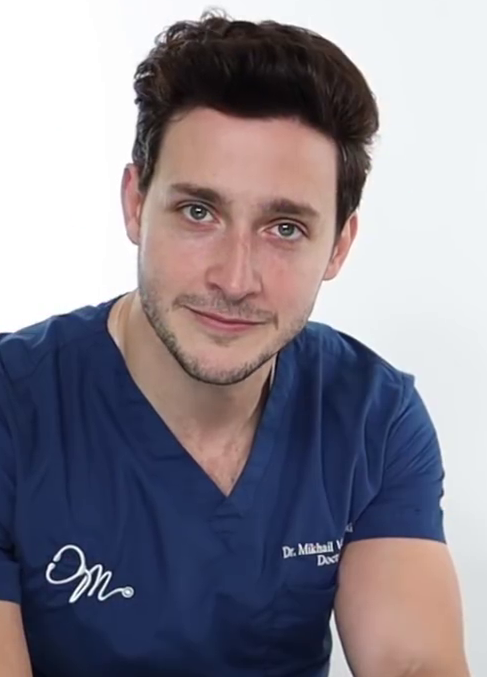
- Varshavski in 2020
- Born: Mikhail Oskarovich Varshavski; November 12, 1989 (age 37); Saransk, Mordovian ASSR, Russian SFSR, Soviet Union
- Education: New York Institute of Technology (BS, DO)
- Medical career
- Profession: Physician
- Field: Family medicine
- Institutions: Atlantic Health System

YouTube information
- Channel: Doctor Mike
- Years active: 2016–present
- Genres: Medical, reactions, vlogs
- Subscribers: 15 million
- Views: 5.5 billion
- Last updated: August 19, 2026
- Website: doctormikemedia.com

Mikhail Oskarovich "Mike" Varshavski (Russian: Михаил Оскарович Варшавский, pronounced [mʲɪxɐˈil ˈoskərəvʲɪtɕ vɐrˈʂafskʲɪj]; born November 12, 1989), known popularly as Doctor Mike, is a Soviet-born American family medicine physician, YouTuber, and internet personality. His Instagram account went viral after he was featured in BuzzFeed and People magazine named him The Sexiest Doctor Alive in 2015. He has a YouTube channel on which he posts medically themed entertainment videos and debunkings of false medical claims.

== Early life ==
Mikhail Oskarovich Varshavski was born on November 12, 1989, in Saransk, Soviet Union, to an ethnically Russian mother and a father of Jewish origin. His father, Oskar, who was born in the Ukrainian SSR, worked as a physician after graduating from the Third Medical Institute of Moscow, while his mother, who was of Russian origin, was a mathematics professor. He has an older sister, Dasha, who was born in 1980. When he was five, he and his family immigrated to Brooklyn, New York.

Varshavski was given the nickname "Doctor Mike" during his high school years by friends who came to him for sports-related injuries. After seeing his father's relationship with his patients, he wanted to become a doctor. He enrolled in the New York Institute of Technology and was accepted for an accelerated, seven-year combined track for a bachelor's degree in life sciences and a Doctor of Osteopathic Medicine upon completion of the undergraduate program. During his first year in the NYIT medical portion of the accelerated program, his mother died of leukemia, and he decided to move back in with his father. In 2014, he started a residency at the Atlantic Health System Overlook Medical Center's Family Medicine program, which he completed in 2017.

== Career ==
In early 2012, Varshavski joined Instagram to document his life as a medical student and combat the notion that "you can't have a life in medical school". He uses his social media to provide health information.

Varshavski gained media attention in August 2015 when BuzzFeed published an article about him titled "Um, You Really Need to See This Hot Doctor and His Dog", that highlighted his appearance and relationship with his dog, a husky named Roxy. That November, People magazine named him "the Hottest Doctor Alive" in its Sexiest Man Alive issue, popularizing his Instagram account.

In 2017, after he launched his YouTube channel, Varshavski gave a TEDx Talk on "The epidemic of the 'I Know It All' expert" at a TEDxMonteCarlo event, the video of which has garnered over 3 million views.

In 2018, after his residency, he joined Chatham Family Medicine, a family practice with Atlantic Health System, in Chatham, New Jersey.

During the COVID-19 pandemic, Varshavski reconfigured his YouTube videos to answer people's questions about the virus. He debunked many of Judy Mikovits's claims about COVID-19 from the conspiracy film Plandemic. In March 2020, he interviewed Anthony Fauci, the director of the National Institute of Allergy and Infectious Diseases (NIAID), about the pandemic.

=== Boxing career ===
Varshavski made his amateur boxing debut in May 2022 against influencer iDubbbz as the headline fight in the Creator Clash boxing event. He won his match against iDubbbz in a unanimous decision. On 29 October 2022, in Glendale, Arizona, Varshavski made his professional debut in a four-round cruiserweight bout against former MMA fighter Chris Avila on the undercard of Jake Paul vs. Anderson Silva. He lost the fight via unanimous decision.

=== Racing ===
In April 2026, Varshavski announced he would be competing in the 2026 Ferrari Challenge North America Club Challenge season.

=== YouTube channel health-related podcast ===
In September 2022, Varshavski launched a health-related podcast on his YouTube channel named "The Checkup Podcast with Doctor Mike", which was renamed to "The Checkup with Doctor Mike". The podcast covers subjects related to sexual health, mental health, physical health, and social health. Varshavski has interviewed friends, medical professionals, athletes, comedians and actors. Guests have included Steve-O, KSI, Tony Hale, Dane Cook, Hannah Brown, Marques Brownlee, Steve Madden, Steven He, Barbara Corcoran, Kal Penn, Brandon Marshall, and Chuck Schumer.

=== Philanthropy ===
In late 2015, Varshavski established a foundation, Limitless Tomorrow, to provide scholarships to students, and he has raised money for it by auctioning experiences with himself through his social media accounts. In January 2016, the dating app Coffee Meets Bagel collaborated in a $10 raffle for a date with Varshavski; the campaign raised $91,000 for his foundation.

In July 2019, Varshavski spread awareness for the humanitarian organization Save a Child's Heart by posting a photo with the organization's 5,000th patient while on a trip to Israel. In March 2020, he donated $50,000 worth of N95 masks in the face of shortages for medical personnel due to the COVID-19 pandemic. In late March 2022, Varshavski set up a donation to GlobalGiving for Ukrainian people during the Russian invasion of Ukraine. In June 2022, he donated $100,111 to Feeding America through a fundraiser organized by YouTuber Ryan Trahan. In July 2025, he donated $70,000 to St. Jude Children's Research Hospital through a fundraiser organized by the same YouTuber.

== Personal life ==
In 2016, he and Filipina actress and 2015 Miss Universe Pia Wurtzbach met at a charity event in New York and started dating. He dated American television news reporter Jennifer Lahmers in 2017. As of October 2026, he is dating influencer Angelina Belfiore.

=== Political views ===
In a May 2024 interview with podcaster Steven Bartlett, he expressed that although that he was "pro-capitalism", he believed that healthcare is not a standard commodity and should not be managed or marketed as an on-demand consumer good.

== Boxing record ==
=== Professional ===
1 fight	0 wins	1 loss
By decision	0	1

No.	Result	Record	Opponent	Type	Round, time	Date	Location	Notes
1	Loss	0–1	Chris Avila	UD	4	Oct 29, 2022	Desert Diamond Arena, Glendale, Arizona, U.S.	

=== Exhibition ===
1 fight	1 win	0 losses
By decision	1	0

No.	Result	Record	Opponent	Type	Round, time	Date	Location	Notes
1	W	1–0	iDubbbz	UD	5	May 14, 2022	Yuengling Center, Tampa, Florida, U.S.	

== TV appearances ==
Year	Title	Role	Notes
2016	Who Wants to Be a Millionaire?	Himself	Episode: "Hometown Heroes Week 5"
2017–2019	Today	Himself	2 episodes
2017–2020	Opening Bell with Maria Bartiromo	Himself	12 episodes
2017	Rachael Ray	Himself	Episode: "October 5, 2017"
2018–2020	Fox & Friends	Himself	2 episodes
2018–2020	Live with Kelly and Ryan	Himself	2 episodes
2018	The Doctors	Himself (guest, co-host)	Episode: "January 17, 2018"
2019	Sidewalks Entertainment	Himself (guest)	Episode: "Doctor Mike"
2019	Cavuto: Coast to Coast	Himself	Episode: "March 5, 2019"
2019	Peston	Himself (guest)	Episode: "25 March 2020"
2020	Access Hollywood	Himself	Episode: "24.182"
2020	The Talk	Himself	Episode: "Wayne Brady/Jonathan Mangum/Dr. Mike"

== Awards and nominations ==
Year	Award	Category	Result	Ref.
2018	Shorty Awards	Health and Wellness	Nominated	
2019	Shorty Awards	Breakout YouTuber of the Year	Nominated	
2020	Webby Awards	Education & Discovery	Won	
2020	Webby Awards	Health & Fitness	Won	
2021	Streamy Awards	Health and Wellness	Won	
2022	Webby Awards	Best Influencer (People's Choice)	Won	
