= Ollie Cooper (boxer) =

English boxer (born 2000)

Personal information
- Nationality: English
- Born: Oliver Cooper; 23 September 2000 (age 26)
- Height: 6 ft 4 in (193 cm)
- Weight: Super-middleweight

Boxing career
- Stance: Southpaw

Boxing record
- Total fights: 13
- Wins: 13
- Win by KO: 3

Ollie Cooper (born 23 September 2000) is an English professional boxer. He has held the English super-middleweight title since May 2026.

== Career ==
A professional boxer since 2021, Cooper had compiled a perfect record of eight wins from eight fights when he challenged unbeaten Midlands Area super-middleweight champion Liam O'Hare at The Premier Suite in Cannock on 28 November 2024, taking the title with a sixth round stoppage.

He made the first defense of his title against Tom Ramsden at Chase Leisure Centre in Cannock on 13 September 2025. Cooper knocked his opponent to the canvas in the third round and, although Ramsden got back to his feet, the referee stopped the contest shortly afterwards as the challenger sustained further unanswered punches to his head.

Cooper faced James Osborne for the vacant English super-middleweight title at York Hall in London on 29 May 2026. He won by stoppage in the eighth round.

== Professional boxing record ==
13 fights	13 wins	0 losses
By knockout	3	0
By decision	10	0

No.	Result	Record	Opponent	Type	Round, time	Date	Location	Notes
13	Win	13–0	James Osborne	TKO	8 (10), 2:58	29 May 2026	York Hall, London, England	Won vacant English super-middleweight title
12	Win	12–0	Tom Ramsden	TKO	3 (10), 2:48	13 Sep 2025	Chase Leisure Centre, Cannock, England	Retained Midlands Area super-middleweight title
11	Win	11–0	Dylan Courtney	PTS	6	26 Jul 2025	King's Hall, Stoke, England	
10	Win	10–0	Serhii Ksendzov	PTS	6	8 Mar 2025	The Hangar Events Venue, Wolverhampton, England	
9	Win	9–0	Liam O'Hare	TKO	6 (10), 2:16	28 Nov 2024	The Premier Suite, Cannock, England	Won Midlands Area super-middleweight title
8	Win	8–0	Mike Byles	PTS	6	28 Apr 2024	The Premier Suite, Cannock, England	
7	Win	7–0	Patryk Polasik	PTS	6	28 Sep 2023	The Premier Suite, Cannock, England	
6	Win	6–0	Pavol Garaj	PTS	6	22 Jun 2023	The Premier Suite, Cannock, England	
5	Win	5–0	Genadij Krajevskij	PTS	4	28 Apr 2023	The Hangar Events Venue, Wolverhampton, England	
4	Win	4–0	Lewis van Poetsch	PTS	4	6 May 2022	The Hangar Events Venue, Wolverhampton, England	
3	Win	3–0	Josh Cook	PTS	4	18 Feb 2022	The Hangar Events Venue, Wolverhampton, England	
2	Win	2–0	Paul Cummings	PTS	4	12 Dec 2021	The Hangar Events Venue, Wolverhampton, England	
1	Win	1–0	Kevin McCauley	PTS	4	1 Oct 2021	The Hangar Events Venue, Wolverhampton, England	
