= Swingler =

Swingler is a surname. Notable people with the surname include:

- Jay Swingler (born 1995), British YouTuber
- Lewis Ossie Swingler (c. 1905–1962), African-American journalist, newspaper editor, and publisher
- Randall Swingler (1909–1967), British poet
- Stephen Swingler (1915–1969), British politician, MP and government minister

== See also ==
- Swindler (surname)
