= Swindler (disambiguation) =

A swindler is generally a charlatan, a person practicing quackery, fraud, or similar confidence trick in order to obtain money, property, or advantage by pretense.

== People ==
- Swindler (surname), list of people with this name

== Media ==
- The Swindler (novel) (Spanish: El Buscón), 1604
- The Swindler, novel by Ethel M. Dell
- The Swindler (film), 1919 British silent drama film based on the story by Ethel M. Dell
- The Swinder, Swedish documentary by Jon Ekstrand
- The Swindlers, re-release title for the 1946 film White Tie and Tails
- The Swindlers (1963 film), 1963 Italian comedy film
- The Swindlers (2017 film), Korean action film
- Swindler, a fictional character, and toy in the Micromasters line

== See also ==
- Swindle (disambiguation)
