= Swindle =

A swindle is a kind of fraud or confidence trick.

Swindle may also refer to:

== People ==
- Swindle (surname)

== Places ==
- Swindle Island, British Columbia, Canada
- 8690 Swindle, an asteroid

== Films ==
- Il bidone (English titles The Swindle or The Swindlers), a 1955 Italian film directed by Federico Fellini
- Squadra antitruffa (English titles The Swindle), a 1977 Italian film directed by Bruno Corbucci
- The Swindle (1997 film), a French crime-comedy film directed by Claude Chabrol and starring Isabelle Huppert
- Swindle (2002 film), a crime thriller starring Tom Sizemore and Sherilyn Fenn
- Swindle (2013 film), a television film based on Gordon Korman's book Swindle

== Other uses ==
- Swindle (chess), a ruse by which a chess player in a losing position tricks his opponent
- Swindle (Transformers), several fictional characters in the Transformers universe
- Swindle (novel), a 2008 children's book by Gordon Korman
- Swindle (magazine), a bi-monthly arts and culture publication from 2004 to 2009
- The Swindle (video game), a 2015 video game

== See also ==
- Swindler (disambiguation)
- Swindled (film), a 2004 Spanish-French thriller
