= TGFbro =

British YouTube channel

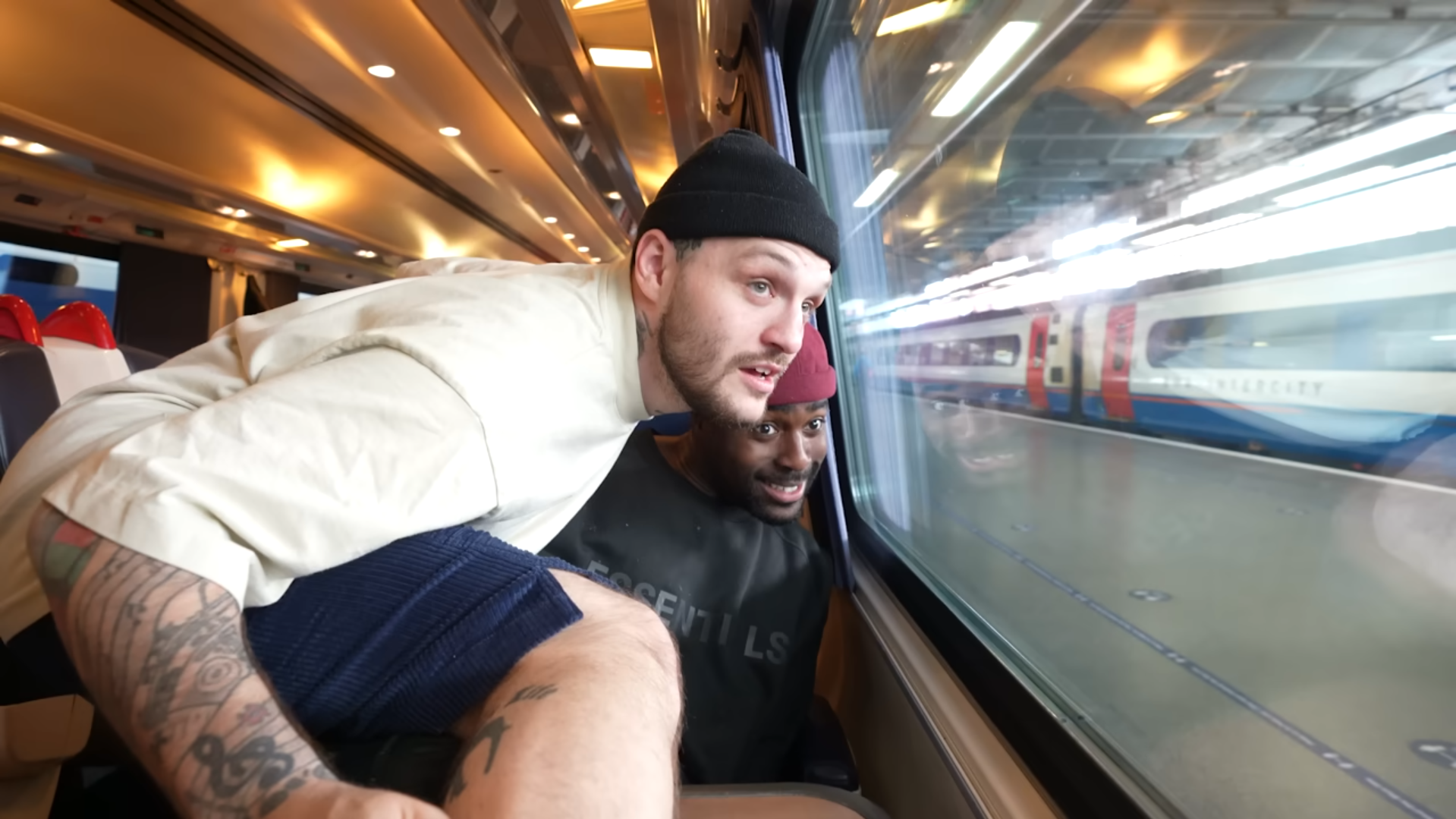
- TGFbro in 2021; Jay Swingler (top) and Romell Henry (bottom)
- Born: Jamie Michael Swingler 17 March 1995 (age 31) Dudley, England; Romell Claudius Henry 8 February 1995 (age 31) Lisbon, Portugal
- Occupations: YouTubers; rappers

YouTube information
- Channel: TGFbro
- Years active: 2012–2022, 2025–present
- Genres: Comedy; vlog; internet challenges; extreme pranks; extreme stunts; music
- Subscribers: 6.16 million
- Views: 1.51 billion
- Last updated: 4 September 2026

TGFbro (short for The Ground Floor), often shortened to simply TGF, is a British YouTube channel created on 23 May 2012 by Jamie "Jay" Swingler and Romell Henry. The channel primarily consists of vlogs, internet challenges, extreme pranks, extreme stunts, and music videos. As of September 2026, the channel has over 1.51 billion views and 6.16 million subscribers.

In December 2025, the TGFbro channel announced its return to YouTube after three years of inactivity, with a 24-hour live stream inspired by their "Extreme Christmas Calendar" series.

== History ==
The group was formed in 2012 when Swingler tweeted out who would want to make videos with him, and Henry replied, "I'm on it".

Due to the often extreme nature of the stunts that appeared on the channel, they were subject to multiple controversies and gained regular national media attention for stunts that include bringing the video game series Grand Theft Auto to life and a live action hide and seek in Birmingham city centre with a £10,000 reward that led to a police warning.

In 2016, the pair hosted a show on Channel 4 called Polterguest.

In January 2024, Swingler revealed in a post on his subreddit, "r/jayswingler", that the TGFbro channel had ended, saying, "It became too hard to sustain. From a legal standpoint, it was just getting out of hand, and life was becoming unbearable with all the trouble we dealt with over the years, not to mention the mental health issues, the broken bones, the cuts, the bruises, and the pain." Romell later also confirmed this in July 2024 on his new podcast "Vocal Pickups".

In December 2025, Swingler and Henry announced their return to the TGFbro channel.

== Controversies ==
=== I Cemented My Head In A Microwave ===
In 2017, the duo uploaded the video "I Cemented My Head In A Microwave", in which spackling paste is used to seal Swingler's head into a microwave. However, the makeshift breathing tube became blocked, and attempts to remove Swingler's head from the microwave failed, resulting in emergency services being called to remove his head to prevent him from suffocating.

Following the incident, Swingler was criticised by both the public and the West Midlands Fire Service for "a call-out which might have prevented us from helping someone else in genuine, accidental need". After the story went viral, prompting a BBC News interview, Swingler responded to the controversy, saying "The plan was literally to set my head in there but not let it set completely. It [the cement] was like a thick jelly... if I really wanted to, I could pull it [the microwave] off and it would slide off. I thought 10 more minutes wouldn't hurt... [but the cement] solidified a lot faster than I thought." He also stated that he was thankful for the help from the firefighters and would be willing to pay a fine.

In 2018, the incident was dramatised in the Fox television series 9-1-1.

=== Extreme Driving Test ===
In March 2020, the duo uploaded the video "Extreme Driving Test", in which the duo, accompanied by a driving instructor, drove recklessly onto grass embankments, crashed into parked vehicles, and flipped their car in the areas of Telford and Wrekin and Staffordshire.

In a statement, West Mercia Police announced that Swingler, Henry and the instructor faced prosecution under "Operation Snap". The duo were charged with dangerous driving on 6 March 2020, while the instructor was charged with two counts of aiding and abetting dangerous driving. On 17 March 2020, Swingler's house in Telford was raided by West Mercia Police; Swingler was advised to stay away from his house. He went to London that night, before the United Kingdom was placed on lockdown due to the COVID-19 pandemic. On 15 September 2022, Swingler and Henry pleaded guilty to careless driving and were sentenced at Shrewsbury Crown Court. Both were fined £1000 each, ordered to pay £95 court costs, and given five penalty points on their driving licenses. The instructor will be sentenced at a later date for aiding and abetting the driving of a car without due care and attention.

== Other ventures ==
=== Swingler's boxing career ===
On 25 August 2018, Swingler had an amateur boxing bout on the undercard of KSI vs Logan Paul at Manchester Arena, Manchester, England. He fought British YouTuber AnEsonGib and lost via unanimous decision.

On 27 August 2022, it was announced that Swingler would make his professional boxing debut against American YouTuber Cherdleys as co-feature bout on MF & DAZN: X Series 002 at the Sheffield Arena, in Sheffield, England on 15 October. On 15 September the bout was changed to the headliner after the bout between Hasim Rahman Jr. and Vitor Belfort was postponed to X Series 003. Swingler defeated Cherdleys via knockout in the first round.

On 14 January 2023, it was announced that Swingler would face Singaporean YouTuber NichLmao as the headliner to X Series 005 in Milton Keynes, England on 25 February. However, the bout was postponed to 4 March at the Telford International Centre in Telford, England due to clashes with Jake Paul vs Tommy Fury on the same date. Swingler defeated NichLmao via majority decision.

On 5 May, Swingler announced his retirement from the sport and instead wanted to focus more on content creation. However, on 31 August 2024 at X Series 17, Swingler announced that he was no longer retired and called out NichLmao for a rematch. On 14 October, the rematch between Swingler and NichLmao was announced for X Series 19 – Qatar: The Supercard at the Lusail Sports Arena in Doha, Qatar on 28 November. However, Swingler withdrew from the bout due to medical issues and was replaced by Warren Spencer.

=== Troof or Miff ===
Troof or Miff is a British game show created and presented by Swingler and Henry, which premiered on YouTube on 18 June 2025. The series was hosted by Jack Carl Dean for the first eight episodes, and Chloe Constance, Swingler's girlfriend, since episode nine. In the show, Swingler and Henry are asked a random question, and they have to guess whether it's a "troof" (truth) or a "miff" (myth). The second series premiered on 29 April 2026.
