= KSI vs FaZe Temperrr =

2023 crossover boxing match

MF & DAZN: X Series 004
- Date: 14 January 2023
- Venue: Wembley Arena, London, England
- Title on the line: MFB cruiserweight championship

Tale of the tape
Boxer	KSI	FaZe Temperrr
Nickname	The Nightmare	The Sniper
Hometown	Watford, England	Pitangui, Minas Gerais, Brazil
Pre-fight record	3–0 (2 KOs) (Note: On BoxRec, KSI's professional record is 1–0 and his MF-professional record is 2–0 (2 KOs).)	1–1 (1 KOs) (Note: On BoxRec, Temperrr's professional record is 1–0 (1 KOs) and his MF-professional record is 0–1.)
Height	6 ft 0 in (1.83 m)	6 ft 4 in (1.93 m)
Weight	175 lb (79 kg)	175.9 lb (80 kg)
Style	Orthodox	Southpaw
Recognition	MFB cruiserweight champion	

Result
- KSI defeated Temperrr via round 1 KO.

MF & DAZN: X Series 004 featured KSI vs FaZe Temperrr, which was a cruiserweight MF–professional crossover boxing match contested between English YouTuber KSI and Brazilian YouTuber FaZe Temperrr for the MFB cruiserweight title. The bout took place at Wembley Arena in London, England on 14 January 2023. The fight reportedly sold 300,000 PPV buys.

== Background ==
After defeating Luis Alcaraz Pineda in August 2022, KSI announced that he will return to the ring in January 2023 and called out Slim Albaher, winner of the Austin McBroom vs. AnEsonGib bout, Andrew Tate, and Tommy Fury. On 19 November, it was announced that KSI vs Dillon Danis was set for 14 January at Wembley Arena, London, England.

However, on 4 January, Danis withdrew from the bout due to lack of preparation and coaching, as well as issues with the contracted weight. That same day it was announced that FaZe Temperrr will be KSI's opponent. Temperrr was originally on the undercard with a mystery opponent that would be announced on fight night.

=== Face off ===
The virtual Face Off between KSI and Danis was hosted by Kai Cenat on his personal Twitch page on 3 December. Within the Face Off, KSI revealed to Cenat that his next opponent following Danis could be either Tyron Woodley or Joe Fournier. KSI also stated that the bout between him and Jake Paul is slated for the end of 2023 and that the contract is underway.

=== Press conferences ===
The launch press conference was held at the on 15 December. Danis was not present during the conference as he was cited as "suffering a bout of influenza" and when requested to join via a Zoom call, he refused. Danis later tweeted "the king does what he wants".

The final press conference was held at Boxpark on 12 January and open to the public.

=== Card ===
KSI vs FaZe Temperrr headlined the event, while Slim Albaher vs Tom Zanetti served as the co-main event. The undercard consisted of Salt Papi vs Josh Brueckner, Luis Alcaraz Pineda vs BDave, Ryan Taylor vs Swarmz, Faith Ordway vs Elle Brooke, and Anthony Taylor vs Idris Virgo.

== Fight card ==
Weight class		vs		Method	Round	Time	Notes
Cruiserweight	KSI (c)	def.	FaZe Temperrr	KO	1/6	2:19	^{Note 1}
Light heavyweight	Slim Albaher (c)	def.	Tom Zanetti	UD	4		^{Note 2}
Cruiserweight	Salt Papi	def.	Josh Brueckner	KO	2/4	1:39
Light heavyweight	Luis Alcaraz Pineda	def.	BDave	UD	3
Cruiserweight	Swarmz	def.	Ryan Taylor	TKO	1/3	0:49
Cruiserweight	Elle Brooke	def.	Faith Ordway	TKO	1/3	1:41
Light heavyweight	Idris Virgo	def.	Anthony Taylor	UD	4

(Note: Joe Fournier was scheduled to face Tony Christodoulou on the undercard. However on 7 January, it was announced that the bout was called off after Christodoulu failed medical testing.)

^Note 1 For MFB cruiserweight title
^Note 2 For MFB light heavyweight title

== Broadcasting ==
Country/Region	Broadcasters				
Country/Region	Free	Cable TV	PPV	Stream	Cinema
United Kingdom (Host)	—N/a		DAZN PPV		ODEON; Vue
United States	—N/a		DAZN PPV		—N/a
Canada	—N/a		DAZN PPV		—N/a
France	—N/a		DAZN PPV		—N/a
Australia	—N/a		DAZN PPV		—N/a
New Zealand	—N/a		DAZN PPV		—N/a
Sweden	—N/a		DAZN PPV		—N/a
Mexico	—N/a		DAZN PPV		—N/a
Ireland	—N/a		DAZN PPV		—N/a
The Netherlands	—N/a		DAZN PPV		—N/a
Worldwide	—N/a			DAZN	—N/a

== MF & DAZN: X Series 005 ==
During the broadcast, it was announced that Jay Swingler vs NichLmao would take place on 25 February 2023 in Milton Keynes, England. It was later announced that the event had been postponed to 4 March in Telford, England due to clashes with Jake Paul vs Tommy Fury on the same date.

== See also ==
- 2023 in Misfits Boxing
