= Swindell =

Swindell or Swindells is a surname. Notable people with the name include:

- A. B. Swindell (born 1945), American politician
- Bernard Swindell (1901–1968), British trade unionist
- Bert Swindells (1909–2001), English footballer
- Charles Swindells (born 1942), American diplomat
- Cole Swindell (born 1983), American country music singer-songwriter
- Connor Swindells (born 1996), British actor and model
- Frank Swindell (1874–1975), British Anglican Archdeacon of Singapore
- Greg Swindell (born 1965), American baseball pitcher
- Jackie Swindells (1937–2009), English footballer
- Josh Swindell (1883–1969), American Major League Baseball pitcher in four games
- Michael Swindells (died 2004), British police officer stabbed to death in 2004
- Robert Swindell (born 1950), English cricketer
- Robert Swindells (born 1939), British children's writer
- Retha Swindell, American basketball player, first Black woman on the Texas Longhorns women's basketball team (1975–1979)
- Sammy Swindell (born 1955), American race car driver
- Sean Swindell, retired United States Army major general in command of a bungled airstrike on a Doctors Without Borders hospital in Kunduz, Afghanistan, in 2015
- Steve Swindells (born 1952), English singer, songwriter, keyboardist, club promoter and journalist

== See also ==
- Swindell Bridge, Pittsburgh, Pennsylvania, United States
- Swindells Hall, Portland, Oregon, United States, an academic building on the University of Portland campus
- Albin B. Swindell House and Store, Swindell Fork, North Carolina, United States, on the National Register of Historic Places
- Swindall
- Swindle (surname)
