= Joel Morris (businessman) =

British YouTuber and businessman

- Born: England, United Kingdom
- Other name: JMX
- Occupations: YouTuber, entrepreneur
- Years active: 2010s–present
- Known for: Co-founder & CEO of Fanvue

Joel Morris (also known online as JMX) is a British YouTuber, digital content creator, and entrepreneur. He is best known for his YouTube channel JMX and as co-founder and CEO of the subscription-based content platform Fanvue.

== Career ==
Morris began publishing content on the video-sharing platform YouTube under the alias JMX.

His channel focuses on gaming, lifestyle and football-related content and has been active since the 2010s. The channel has attracted more than two million subscribers according to influencer-marketing databases.

In 2020, during the COVID-19 lockdown, Morris co-founded the creator-monetisation platform Fanvue with British entrepreneur William Monange. The London-based company enables creators to earn money through subscriptions, tips, and pay-walled content. In April 2021, Fanvue announced that it had raised approximately US$1 million (about £724,000) in pre-launch funding. Morris was quoted in the company's announcement as saying that Fanvue was "built for creators by creators".

In 2021, Morris was associated with the blockchain-based influencer project XCAD Network. Following criticism of a related token sale, he issued a public apology and stepped down from involvement in the project.

=== Boxing career ===
==== Amateur career ====
Morris made his boxing debut on 3 February 2018 on the undercard of KSI vs. Joe Weller, where he defeated Mike Fox via technical knockout in the third round.

On 25 August 2018 on the undercard of KSI vs Logan Paul, Morris defeated Coach Richard via unanimous decision.

==== Professional career ====
Morris made his professional boxing debut on 15 October 2022 at MF & DAZN: X Series 002, where he fought TikTok creator Ginty. The bout took place at the Utilita Arena in Sheffield and ended in a majority draw, with Morris scoring a knockdown during the contest.

In April 2023, Morris made his second appearance for the influencer-focused event series Misfits Boxing, promoted by British YouTuber KSI’s company. He competed on the card MF & DAZN: X Series 006, held at the XULA Convocation Center in New Orleans, Louisiana.

Morris faced former NFL running back Le'Veon Bell in the headline bout of the card. The fight lasted four rounds, with Bell winning by unanimous decision. The event was broadcast globally via the sports streaming platform DAZN and formed part of the crossover boxing series developed by KSI’s Misfits Boxing promotion.

== Controversies ==
=== XCAD Network and "Save the Kids" token controversy (2021) ===
In mid-2021, Morris was linked to a controversy surrounding the blockchain-based influencer-token platform XCAD Network and the related cryptocurrency project Save the Kids token. According to Esports News UK reporting, Morris had promoted the XCAD token and was later accused by online commentators of selling a large portion of his holdings shortly before a market crash.

Morris responded publicly in a written statement, claiming that he "panicked" after seeing other major sell-orders and sold his tokens to avoid losses, and denied intentionally misleading investors. He subsequently stepped down from his involvement with the XCAD Network project.

== Boxing record ==
=== Professional ===
1 fight	0 wins	1 loss
By decision	0	1

No.	Result	Record	Opponent	Type	Round, time	Date	Location	Notes
1	Loss	0–1	Le'Veon Bell	UD	4	21 April 2023	XULA Convocation Centre, New Orleans, Louisiana, U.S.	

=== MF-Professional ===
1 fight	1 win	0 losses
By knockout	1	0

No.	Result	Record	Opponent	Type	Round, time	Date	Location	Notes
1	Win	1–0	Ginty	TKO	3 (3), 0:50	15 Oct 2022	Utilita Arena Sheffield, Sheffield, England	

=== Amateur ===
2 fights	2 wins	0 losses
By knockout	1	0
By decision	1	0

No.	Result	Record	Opponent	Type	Round, time	Date	Location	Notes
2	Win	2–0	Coach Richard	UD	4	25 Aug 2018	Manchester Arena, Manchester, England	
1	Win	1–0	Mike Fox	TKO	3 (3), 1:32	3 Feb 2018	Copper Box Arena, London, England	
