= King Kenny (internet personality) =

English social media personality (born 1997)

- Born: Kenny Oghenovo Ojuederie; 20 March 1997 (age 29); Watford, Hertfordshire, England
- Occupations: Social media personality; boxer
- Years active: 2013–present

Instagram information
- Page: Kenny
- Followers: 785k

TikTok information
- Page: kingkennytv
- Followers: 624k

YouTube information
- Channel: KingKennyTv
- Genres: Entertainment; vlog; pranks
- Subscribers: 2.24 million (Main Channel) 2.58 million (Combined)
- Views: 325 million (Main Channel) 534 million (Combined)

Kenny Oghenovo Ojuederie (born 20 March 1997), better known as King Kenny, is an English social media personality and former boxer. After launching his YouTube account in 2014, which consisted mainly of vlog and prank videos, he joined the YouTube group Beta Squad alongside four other creators on the platform. In 2026, he appeared in the second series of The Celebrity Traitors.

== Life and career ==
Kenny Oghenovo Ojuederie was born on 20 March 1997 in Watford, Hertfordshire, England. He has several siblings and half-siblings, including Daley Perales, who appeared as a housemate on the fourteenth series of Big Brother in 2013. He trained Ojuederie in boxing. He embarked on a media studies course at Brunel University of London. Ojuederie opened his YouTube channel in July 2013 and began posting the following year, including various videos consisting of entertainment, vlogs and pranks. In October 2016, he was arrested on suspicion of a public order offence while filming one of his pranks in which he was dressed as an evil clown wielding a chainsaw around his university campus. He was later released on bail and apologised, stating he was only chasing his friends who were aware of the prank.

In 2019, Ojuederie joined the Beta Squad, a British YouTube collective group, along with fellow YouTubers Chunkz, Niko Omilana, AJ Shabeel and Sharky. In February 2019, the group lived together in a mansion in London, where they created daily content across social media platforms. The group operate a shared channel titled "Beta Squad", where they upload collaborative content and have amassed over 12 million subscribers.

In 2026, Ojuederie was a contestant on the second series of The Celebrity Traitors. He finished fourth in the final episode as a recruited traitor. On 23 October 2026, Ojuederie released his debut single "Don't Let Me Down".

== Boxing career ==
=== Exhibition ===
==== Ojuederie vs Temperrrr ====
Ojuederie made his boxing debut in an exhibition bout against American YouTuber FaZe Temperrr in March 2022 at Wembley Arena in London. Ojuederie initially received a controversial split-decision victory, but the result was overturned following an appeal, with Temperrr ultimately being awarded the victory via unanimous decision.

==== High Stakes Tournament ====
In April 2023, Ojuederie entered the Kingpyn Boxing High Stakes Tournament. In the quarter-finals, he defeated Thai YouTuber My Mate Nate by technical knockout in the second round at the OVO Arena Wembley in London.

Ojuederie advanced to the semi-finals, where he faced Brazilian comedian and YouTuber Whindersson Nunes on 15 July 2023 at the 3Arena in Dublin, Ireland. Ojuederie won by unanimous decision after five rounds, with all three judges scoring the bout 50–44 in his favour. The victory advanced him to the tournament final against fellow English YouTuber AnEsonGib, but the bout ultimately never happened due to Kingpyn declaring bankruptcy and the tournament being cancelled.

=== Professional ===
==== Ojuederie vs Sensei ====
In August 2022, Ojuederie made his professional debut and defeated American YouTuber and martial artist FaZe Sensei by majority decision on the undercard of MF & DAZN: X Series 001 at The O2 Arena in London.

==== Ojuederie vs Money ====
Ojuederie defeated DK Money in November 2022 on the undercard of MF & DAZN: X Series 003 at the Moody Center in Austin, Texas.

==== Ojuederie vs Rak-Su ====
Ojuederie suffered his first officially recorded professional defeat against English musician Ashley Rak-Su in March 2023 on the undercard of MF & DAZN: X Series 005, losing by split decision at the Telford International Centre in Telford, England.

==== Ojuederie vs Taylor ====
Ojuederie faced American mixed martial artist and boxer Anthony Taylor in October 2023 on the undercard of KSI vs Tommy Fury at the Manchester Arena in Manchester, England. The bout was contested for the vacant MFB light-heavyweight championship. Taylor defeated Ojuederie by unanimous decision after five rounds.

==== Ojuederie vs Brooks ====
In May 2024, Ojuederie defeated Adam Brooks via technical knockout in the second round at the Troxy in London.

==== Ojuederie vs Papi ====
In November 2024, Ojuederie was defeated by Filipino TikToker Salt Papi via technical knockout on the undercard of MF & DAZN: X Series 19 – Qatar: The Supercard at the Lusail Sports Arena in Lusail, Qatar.

== Boxing record ==
=== Professional ===
1 fight	1 win	0 losses
By knockout	1	0

No.	Result	Record	Opponent	Type	Round, time	Date	Location	Notes
1	Win	1–0	DK Money	KO	1 (4), 1:34	19 Nov 2022	Moody Center, Austin, Texas, U.S.	

=== MF-Professional ===
5 fights	2 wins	3 losses
By knockout	1	1
By decision	1	2

No.	Result	Record	Opponent	Type	Round, time	Date	Location	Notes
5	Loss	2–3	Salt Papi	TKO	3 (6), 0:40	28 Nov 2024	Lusail Sports Arena, Lusail, Qatar	
4	Win	2–2	Adam Brooks	TKO	2 (5), 2:29	11 May 2024	Troxy, London, England	
3	Loss	1–2	Anthony Taylor	UD	5	14 Oct 2023	AO Arena, Manchester, England	Won vacant MFB light heavyweight title
2	Loss	1–1	Ashley Rak-Su	SD	4	4 Mar 2023	Telford International Centre, Telford, England	
1	Win	1–0	FaZe Sensei	MD	4	27 Aug 2022	The O2 Arena, London, England	

=== Exhibition ===
3 fights	2 wins	1 loss
By knockout	1	0
By decision	1	1

No.	Result	Record	Opponent	Type	Round, time	Date	Location	Notes
3	Win	2–1	Whindersson Nunes	UD	5	15 Jul 2023	3Arena, Dublin, Ireland	High Stakes Tournament semi-final
2	Win	1–1	My Mate Nate	TKO	2 (5), 0:32	22 Apr 2023	The O2 Arena, London, England	High Stakes Tournament quarter-final
1	Loss	0–1	FaZe Temperrr	UD	5	5 Mar 2022	SSE Arena, London, England	Originally scored SD win for Kenny

== Filmography ==
As himself
Year	Title	Notes	Ref.
2026	The Celebrity Traitors	Contestant; series 2	

== Discography ==
Singles
Year	Title	Album	Ref.
2026	"Don't Let Me Down"	Non-album single	
