= Swindall =

Swindall is a surname. Notable people with the surname include:

- Charles Swindall (1876–1939), American politician
- Pat Swindall (1950–2018), American politician, lawyer and businessman
- Steve Swindall (born 1982), Scottish rugby player

== See also ==
- Steve Swindal, American businessman
- Swindell
- Swindle (surname)
