= Kenzie Morrison =

American boxer (born 1990)

James McKenzie Witt
Personal information
- Nicknames: "McKenzie"; "TCB" ("Taking Care of Business")
- Born: James McKenzie Witt; July 18, 1990 (age 36) Miami, Oklahoma, U.S.
- Height: 6 ft 4 in (193 cm)
- Weight: Heavyweight

Boxing career
- Reach: 79 in (201 cm)
- Stance: Orthodox

Boxing record
- Total fights: 25
- Wins: 22
- Win by KO: 20
- Losses: 1
- Draws: 2

James McKenzie Witt (born July 18, 1990) known professionally as Kenzie Morrison, is an American professional boxer and bare-knuckle boxer. He is the son of deceased former World Boxing Organization heavyweight world champion Tommy Morrison. In August 2026 KTUL news reported that Morrison has stage 4 stomach cancer which has metastasized to his spine. He is seeking treatment in Oklahoma City, Oklahoma. A GoFundMe was created for Morrison that has raised $30,000 as of August 31, 2026.

== Professional career ==
Prior to his cancer diagnosis he boxed professionally from 2014 to 2024. Morrison has a pro record of 22–1–2 (20 KO's). He boxed at the Buffalo Run Casino & Resort in Miami, Oklahoma thirteen times. Morrison's first ten opponents had a combined record of 12 wins and 17 losses.

He defeated Hasim Rahman Jr. by TKO on April 29, 2022 at Virgin Hotel in Las Vegas, Nevada in a match contested the USA-USNBC heavyweight belt. In his next fight, Morrison suffered an upset loss to Robert Simms by unanimous decision on October 22, 2022 in Kansas City.

== Bare-knuckle boxing ==
Morrison made his Bare Knuckle Fighting Championship debut against Alex Davis on June 21, 2025 at BKFC 76 and won by technical knockout one minute into the first round.

== Personal life ==
Morrison married longtime girlfriend Kristen Hada on August 26, 2026. His half brother Trey Lippe Morrison has also boxed professionally.

== Bare-knuckle boxing record ==
Professional record breakdown
| 1 match | 1 win | 0 losses |
| By knockout | 1 | 0 |
| By decision | 0 | 0 |
| Draws | 0 | |

| Res. | Record | Opponent | Method | Event | Date | Round | Time | Location | Notes |
|---|---|---|---|---|---|---|---|---|---|
| TKO | 0-0 (1) | Alex Davis | TKO | BKFC 76 | June 21, 2025 | 1 | 1:03 | Fort Worth, Texas, United States | |
