= Paul Bamba =

Puerto Rican boxer (1989–2024)

Personal information
- Nationality: Puerto Rico; United States
- Born: 15 August 1989 Río Piedras, Puerto Rico
- Died: 27 December 2024 (aged 35) New York City, New York, U.S.
- Weight: Light heavyweight Cruiserweight

Boxing career

Boxing record
- Total fights: 22
- Wins: 19
- Win by KO: 18
- Losses: 3
- Draws: 0
- No contests: 0

Paul Bamba (15 August 1989 – 27 December 2024) was a Puerto Rican professional boxer. In his last fight, he won the WBA Gold cruiserweight title after defeating Rogelio Medina on 21 December 2024.

== Early life and career ==
Bamba was born in Río Piedras, Puerto Rico, on 15 August 1989.

On 4 October 2022, it was announced that Bamba would face British boxer Tommy Fury as the co-feature bout to Floyd Mayweather Jr. vs Deji at the Coca-Cola Arena in Dubai. However, during the weigh-in on 12 November, he weighed in at 176.6 Ibs while Fury weighed in at 181.4 Ibs. Both fighters stated that they made the weight that was stated in their contract. Bamba refused to fight, and on 13 November, the day of the fight, he was replaced by Cameroon boxer Rolly Lambert to fight Fury.

On April 21, 2023 Bamba faced UFC Bellator fighter Chris Avila, and lost by a unanimous decision making his record 5–3. Following the defeat, he went on a knockout streak, with many of the wins believed to have been fixed.

In November 2024, having achieved a record of 18 wins and 3 losses with 17 knockouts in a span of a year and half since his last loss, with 13 straight wins since January 2024 winning all by knockouts, Bamba was the first fighter signed to entertainer Ne-Yo's sports management company. Prior to that he had already captured the WBA-NABA cruiserweight title, WBA Fedecaribe and Fedecentro titles. Bamba first met Ne-Yo as his trainer, teaching him boxing as part of Ne-Yo's workout routine.

In 2024, Bamba fought 14 bouts ending in 14 KOs throughout the year and earned the WBA Gold cruiserweight title after defeating Rogelio Medina. He broke Mike Tyson's record for most professional fights in a one-year span.

== Death ==
Bamba died on 27 December 2024, at the age of 35. It was reported that he made brain damage admission weeks before death. After a fight against Avila, Paul later commented: "fighting Avila with a concussion and losing 22 lbs in three days gave me slight brain damage. Which was a bit scary and I had to take 8 months off so it's not a joking matter." In a later tweet he claimed he wasn't able to speak about it until Misfits Boxing decided to.

== Professional boxing record ==
22 fights	19 wins	3 losses
By knockout	18	1
By decision	1	2

No.	Result	Record	Opponent	Type	Round, time	Date	Location	Notes
22	Win	19–3	Rogelio Medina Luna	RTD	6 (12) 3:00	Dec 21, 2024	Carteret Performing Arts Center, Carteret, New Jersey, United States	Won WBA Gold cruiserweight title
21	Win	18–3	Santander Silgado Gelez	TKO	6 (8)	Nov 2, 2024	Abba Shrine, Mobile, Alabama, United States	
20	Win	17–3	Francisco Cordero	TKO	3 (8) 3:00	Oct 19, 2024	DoubleTree by Hilton, Manchester, New Hampshire, U.S.	Won WBA-NABA cruiserweight title
19	Win	16–3	Angel Giovanni Ocano Garcia	TKO	4 (10) 0:10	Aug 17, 2024	Agua Prieta, Mexico	
18	Win	15–3	Jose Luis Herrera	KO	4 (8) 1:45	Jul 5, 2024	Gimnasio Yorby Mendoza, Cartagena, Colombia	
17	Win	14–3	Ronald Montes	KO	5 (10) 1:10	Jul 1, 2024	Gimnasio Yorby Mendoza, Cartagena, Colombia	Won WBA Fedecaribe Title
16	Win	13–3	Francisco Fuentes	TKO	6 (8) 1:13	Jun 23, 2024	Club de Boxeo Atila, Florida, Colombia	
15	Win	12–3	Jose Ramon Escobedo	KO	2 (8) 1:48	May 3, 2024	La Terraza Sport Bar, Agua Prieta, Sonora, Mexico	Won WBA Fedecentro Title
14	Win	11–3	Adoni Zapata Garcia	TKO	3 (8)	Apr 13, 2024	Complejo Deportivo Santiago Rodriguez, Santo Domingo, Dominican Republic	
13	Win	10–3	Pedro Miranda	TKO	6 (8) 1:23	Apr 2, 2024	Coliseo de Pescaito David Ruiz Ureche, Santa Marta, Colombia	
12	Win	9–3	Victor Coronado	TKO	5 (6) 2:03	Mar 27, 2024	Coliseo de Pescaito David Ruiz Ureche, Santa Marta, Colombia	
11	Win	8–3	Jefferson Troncoso	TKO	2 (6) 2:01	Feb 22, 2024	Coliseo de Pescaito David Ruiz Ureche, Santa Marta, Colombia	
10	Win	7–3	Sergio Luna	KO	2 (4) 1:20	Jan 31, 2024	Coliseo de Pescaito David Ruiz Ureche, Santa Marta, Colombia	
9	Win	6–3	Guillermo Ponce	KO	2 (4) 2:13	Jan 25, 2024	Coliseo de Pescaito David Ruiz Ureche, Santa Maria, Colombia	
8	Loss	5–3	Chris Avila	UD	4	Apr 21, 2023	XULA Convocation Center, New Orleans, Louisiana, United States	
7	Win	5–2	Francisco Morelos	KO	2 (6) 1:12	Sep 8, 2022	Coliseo Luis Patron Rosano, Tolú, Colombia	
6	Loss	4–2	Derrick Vann	SD	4	Aug 20, 2022	Boardwalk Hall, Atlantic City, New Jersey, United States	
5	Win	4–1	Dionisio Miranda	UD	8	Jun 29, 2022	Club Anibal Gonzalez, Cartagena, Colombia	
4	Win	3–1	Hector Nava Lopez	TKO	1 (4) 2:43	Oct 8, 2021	La Terraza Sport Bar, Agua Prieta, Sonora, Mexico	
3	Loss	2–1	Abraham Velazquez Salazar	KO	4 (4) 1:23	Jun 3, 2021	Cancha 4, Hermosillo, Mexico	
2	Win	2–0	Juan Manuel Valenzuela Palma	TKO	1 (4) 2:58	Jan 29, 2021	La Terraza Sport Bar, Agua Prieta, Mexico	
1	Win	1–0	Felix Alexis Cardenas	TKO	1 (4) 1:23	Jan 9, 2021	La Terraza Sport Bar, Agua Prieta, Mexico	
