= Hasim Rahman Jr. =

American boxer (born 1991)

Personal information
- Nickname: Gold Blooded
- Born: Hasim Sharif Rahman Jr. June 15, 1991 (age 35) Baltimore, Maryland, U.S.
- Height: 6 ft 3 in (191 cm)
- Weight: Heavyweight

Boxing career
- Reach: 79 in (201 cm)
- Stance: Orthodox

Boxing record
- Total fights: 17
- Wins: 15
- Win by KO: 8
- Losses: 2

Hasim Sharif Rahman Jr. (born June 15, 1991) is an American professional boxer who challenged for the WBC-USNBC heavyweight title in 2022. He is the son of former world heavyweight champion, Hasim Rahman.

== Early life ==
Hasim Sharif Rahman Jr. was born on June 15, 1991, in Baltimore, Maryland. He is the son of former professional boxer and two-time world heavyweight champion Hasim Rahman.

== Professional career ==
After a lengthy amateur career, Rahman made his professional boxing debut on April 14, 2017. He started his career with three wins via TKO. In 2021 Rahman fought three times, with two fights ending via some knockout.

On April 29, 2022, Rahman fought Kenzie Morrison, the son of former professional boxer, Tommy Morrison, for the WBC-USNBC heavyweight title. Rahman lost via technical knockout.

=== Cancelled bout against Jake Paul ===
Rahman was scheduled to face YouTuber Jake Paul on August 6, 2022, at Madison Square Garden as a late replacement, after British boxer Tommy Fury withdrew citing difficulties in entering the US after his ESTA was denied by US Homeland Security. On July 30, 2022, Paul's promotional company, Most Valuable Promotions (MVP), revealed that Rahman had withdrawn from the fight, and that the entire card was now cancelled. Rahman allegedly withdrew because of weight issues, with the New York State athletic commission unwilling to sanction the fight at the 200lb cruiserweight because Rahman's weight-cut was progressing very slowly, having only lost 1lb since signing the contract. Paul, MVP, and the State commission then agreed to move forward with a new 205lb weight limit, with Rahman initially agreeing to this. However, Rahman then stated that he would not fight unless the fight was sanctioned at 215lb, resulting in MVP terminating his contract and the entire card being scrapped.

=== Rahman vs. Hardy ===
On August 27, 2022, DAZN announced that Rahman would be boxing former UFC Light Heavyweight Champion Vitor Belfort in the main event of MF & DAZN: X Series 002 on October 15, 2022, in Sheffield, England. The bout was postponed to MF & DAZN: X Series 003 on November 19, 2022, and took place at the Moody Center in Austin, Texas. Belfort withdrew from the fight after testing positive for COVID-19. Rahman then faced former NFL player and UFC fighter Greg Hardy and lost via unanimous decision.

On September 14, 2022, it was announced that Rahman had signed to Happy Punch Promotions, a boxing promotion organization founded by YouTubers Keemstar and Fousey.

Rahman was scheduled to face BKFC Heavyweight Champion Alan Belcher on the undercard of MF & DAZN: X Series 008 on July 22, 2023, at the Nashville Municipal Auditorium in Nashville, Tennessee. However, Rahman withdrew due to an injury thus resulting in Belcher to face reality television star Chase DeMoor in an exhibition bout.

== Exhibition bouts ==
=== Team Combat League ===
On March 26, 2023, Rahman announced that he will be taking part in the Team Combat League for the 2023 season representing the DC Destroyers. Rahman Jr.'s first bouts under the team took place in April 2023. On August 15, 2023, Rahman Jr. lost to Conja Nathan by technical knockout in the fifth round. As of May 2024, Rahman Jr. has won one round and lost six rounds for Team Combat League.

=== Rahman vs. Fake Kanye West ===
On March 16, 2024, Rahman took part in an exhibition bout in Wesley Chapel, Tampa, Florida on the Hype Boxing event. Rahman's opponent was announced and marketed as a mystery opponent. On the night, it was revealed that Rahman's opponent was a Kanye West impersonator. Rahman defeated the impersonator via knockout in the 1st round and received heavy backlash on social media. Rahman revealed on Twitter that 7 different opponents withdrew and that the 7th opponent withdrew within an hour from the bout.

== Personal life ==
Rahman Jr. resides in Las Vegas, Nevada. He has twelve siblings, including Sharif Rahman who is also a boxer. Rahman Jr. is a practicing Muslim and has frequently refused gambling and bets due to his beliefs.

In 2013, Rahman Jr. was involved in a car accident that resulted in the death of a driver. He was sentenced to three years in prison for reckless driving. He was released on December 21, 2016.

In 2014, Rahman Jr. and his brother filed a lawsuit alleging 14 different claims against Floyd Mayweather Jr. which came after an incident that involved Rahman Jr.'s brother getting a serious beating from amateur Donovan Cameron while Mayweather watched what was supposed to be a sparring session and prevented the people present from breaking up the fight.

December 2017, Hasim and wife, Lauren Rahman lost their son, Jibra’il Rahman in delivery.

== Boxing record ==
=== Professional ===
17 fights	15 wins	2 losses
By knockout	6	1
By decision	9	1

No.	Result	Record	Opponent	Type	Round, time	Date	Location	Notes
17	Win	15–2	Ronald Montes	UD	8	Dec 28, 2024	Gimnasio OB Boxing Training, Cúcuta, Colombia	
16	Win	14–2	Dell Long	MD	4	Nov 23, 2024	Champion Boxing Gym, Jonesboro, Georgia, US	
15	Win	13–2	Yonny Molina	UD	6	Nov 1, 2024	Gimnasio OB Boxing Training, Cúcuta, Colombia	
14	Loss	12–2	Greg Hardy	UD	4	Nov 19, 2022	Moody Center, Austin, Texas, U.S.	
13	Loss	12–1	Kenzie Morrison	TKO	5 (10), 1:37	Apr 29, 2022	Virgin Hotels Las Vegas, Paradise, Nevada, U.S.	For vacant WBC-USNBC heavyweight title
12	Win	12–0	Nathan Bedwell	TKO	2 (6), 2:01	Aug 14, 2021	Georgia World Congress Center, Atlanta, Georgia, U.S.	
11	Win	11–0	Mario Rodriguez Juarez	MD	6	Jun 4, 2021	Salon de Eventos, Matamoros, Mexico	
10	Win	10–0	Alejandro de la Torre	KO	2 (6), 1:09	Feb 5, 2021	Salon de Eventos, Matamoros, Mexico	
9	Win	9–0	Alejandro de la Torre	UD	4	Feb 7, 2020	Centro de Convenciones Mundo Nuevo, Matamoros, Mexico	
8	Win	8–0	Curtis Head	UD	4	Jun 22, 2019	Rosecroft Raceway, Fort Washington, Maryland U.S.	
7	Win	7–0	Damion Reed	UD	4	Dec 8, 2018	Bowie State University, Bowie, Maryland, U.S.	
6	Win	6–0	Raymond Ochieng	UD	6	Aug 17, 2018	Grand Casino, Hinckley, Minnesota, U.S.	
5	Win	5–0	Steven Tyner	RTD	1 (4), 3:00	Jun 29, 2018	Martin's West, Woodlawn, Maryland, U.S.	
4	Win	4–0	Deon Ronny Hale	MD	4	Feb 10, 2018	2300 Arena, Philadelphia, Pennsylvania, U.S.	
3	Win	3–0	James Jones	TKO	1 (4), 2:21	Nov 4, 2017	DSilver Eagle Gun Arena, Ashburn, Virginia, U.S.	
2	Win	2–0	Demetrius Shaw	TKO	1 (4), 2:16	Apr 21, 2017	DeCarlo's Convention Center, Warren, Michigan, U.S.	
1	Win	1–0	Ralph Alexander	TKO	1 (4), 0:40	Apr 4, 2017	MGM National Harbor, Oxon Hill, Maryland, U.S.	

=== Exhibition ===
1 fight	1 win	0 losses
By knockout	1	0

No.	Result	Record	Opponent	Type	Round, time	Date	Location	Notes
1	Win	1–0	Fake Kanye West	KO	1 (3), 0:50	Mar 16, 2024	Lights Out Boxing & Fitness, Tampa, Florida, U.S.	
