= The Celebrity Traitors series 2 =

2026 series of The Celebrity Traitors

The Celebrity Traitors
- Series 2
- Promotional poster
- Presented by: Claudia Winkleman
- No. of contestants: 21
- Winners: Romesh Ranganathan; Sebastian Croft
- Location: Ardross, Highland, Scotland
- Companion show: The Celebrity Traitors: Uncloaked
- No. of episodes: 10

Release
- Original network: BBC One
- Original release: 1 October – 30 October 2026

Series chronology
- ← Previous; Series 1

The second series of The Celebrity Traitors began airing on BBC One on 1 October 2026, with Claudia Winkleman presenting the ten-episode series. The companion show The Celebrity Traitors: Uncloaked has also returned, hosted by Ed Gamble. In the series, 21 celebrities competed to win up to £100,000 for their chosen charities.

The series concluded on 30 October, 2026, when Romesh Ranganathan and Sebastian Croft won as Faithfuls, sharing the prize money for their chosen charities, the Refugee Council and Choose Love respectively.

== Production ==
In November 2025, following the first series (the finale of which was the most viewed television broadcast in the UK in 2025), it was announced that The Celebrity Traitors had been renewed for a second series. Produced by Studio Lambert, the series began filming in May 2026 at Ardross Castle and had concluded by June. Soon after being announced, the celebrities arrived at the nearby Inverness Airport. During filming, the cast stayed at the Inverness Airport Courtyard by Marriott hotel.

Prior to the official cast announcement, many celebrities expressed interest in appearing on the show, including Amanda Holden, Tom Hiddleston and Danny Dyer, who had turned down appearing on the first series. However, none of these celebrities were cast. Despite this, in March 2026 host Claudia Winkleman hinted that "the cast is extraordinary".

A teaser trailer was released simultaneously with the cast announcement on 2 May 2026, depicting the contestants' names on Traitors slates at an airport; some were misspelt, including "Richardy Grant", "Miranda Heart", and "Rob Bucket" (a reference to the series, in which players often spelt names incorrectly as they voted at the Round Table). A first-look trailer featuring the celebrities was released on 27 August 2026. Speaking at the Edinburgh TV Festival in August 2026, BBC content chief Kate Phillips said that the series will feature "tears and surprises". On 15 September, the series was confirmed to begin on 1 October, with episodes airing on Thursdays and Fridays on BBC One at 8pm. A special programme titled Traitor or Faithful? Claudia Decides was released on BBC iPlayer after the first episode aired.

== Contestants ==
The 21 celebrities competing in the series were revealed on 2 May 2026. The Guardian dubbed the line-up "one of the most high-profile casts ever assembled for a reality TV show". Significant pre-existing relationships between celebrities include the close friendship of comedians Rob Beckett and Romesh Ranganathan, who have appeared together on Rob & Romesh Vs; Ranganathan and Julie Hesmondhalgh, who are the presenter and narrator respectively on The Weakest Link; while Jerry Hall and Richard E. Grant are close friends and neighbours. Their chosen charities were not revealed until after the show had concluded, with the winner's charity named in the final.

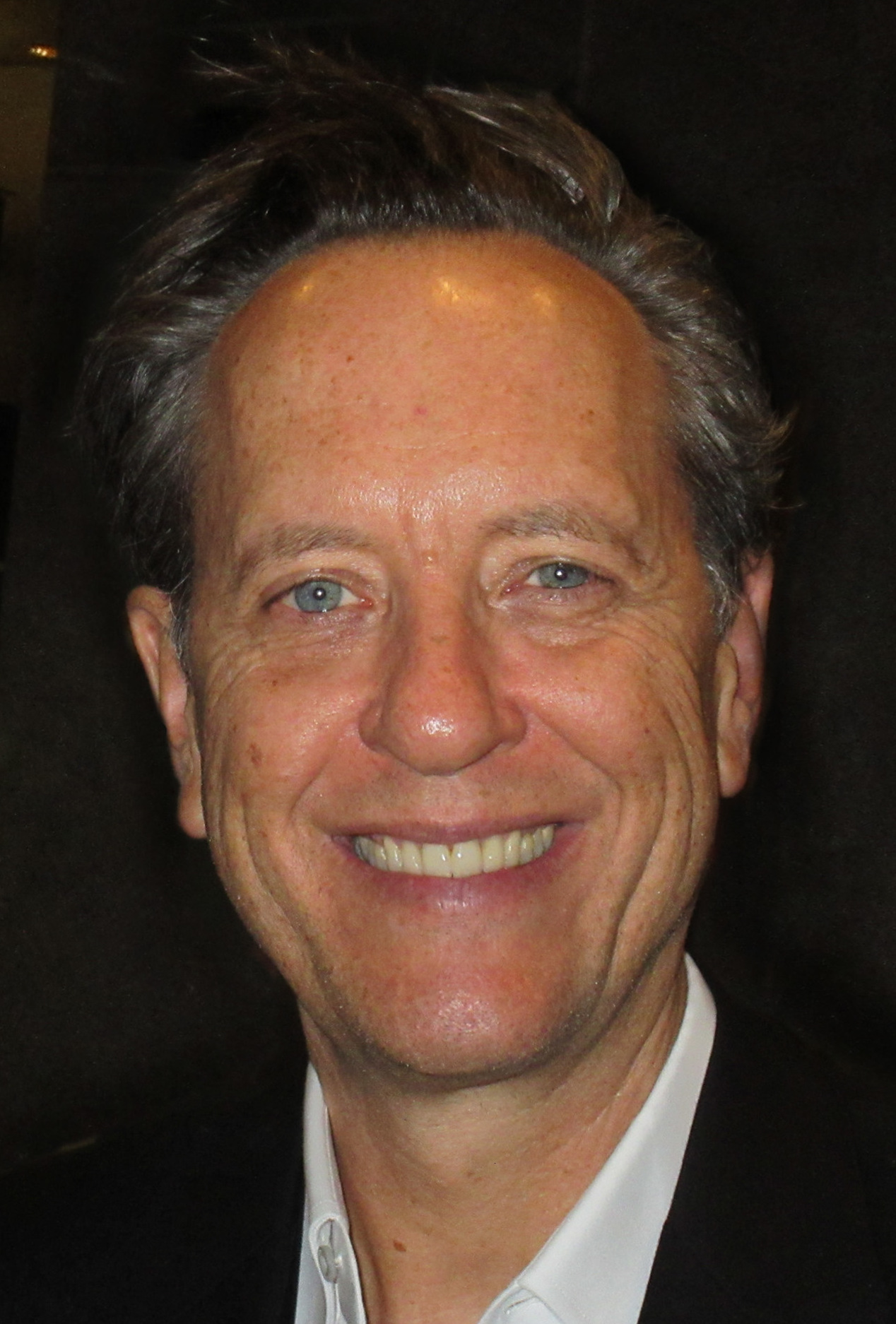
Richard E. Grant

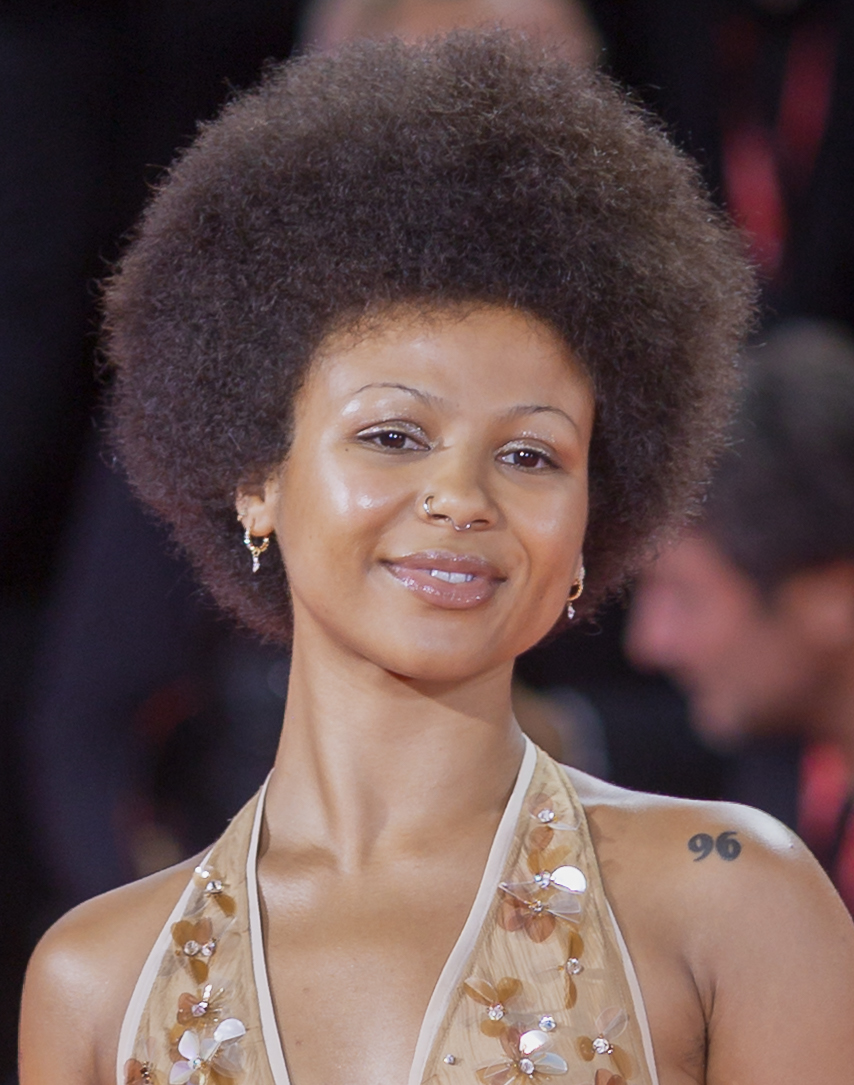
Myha'la

Bella Ramsey

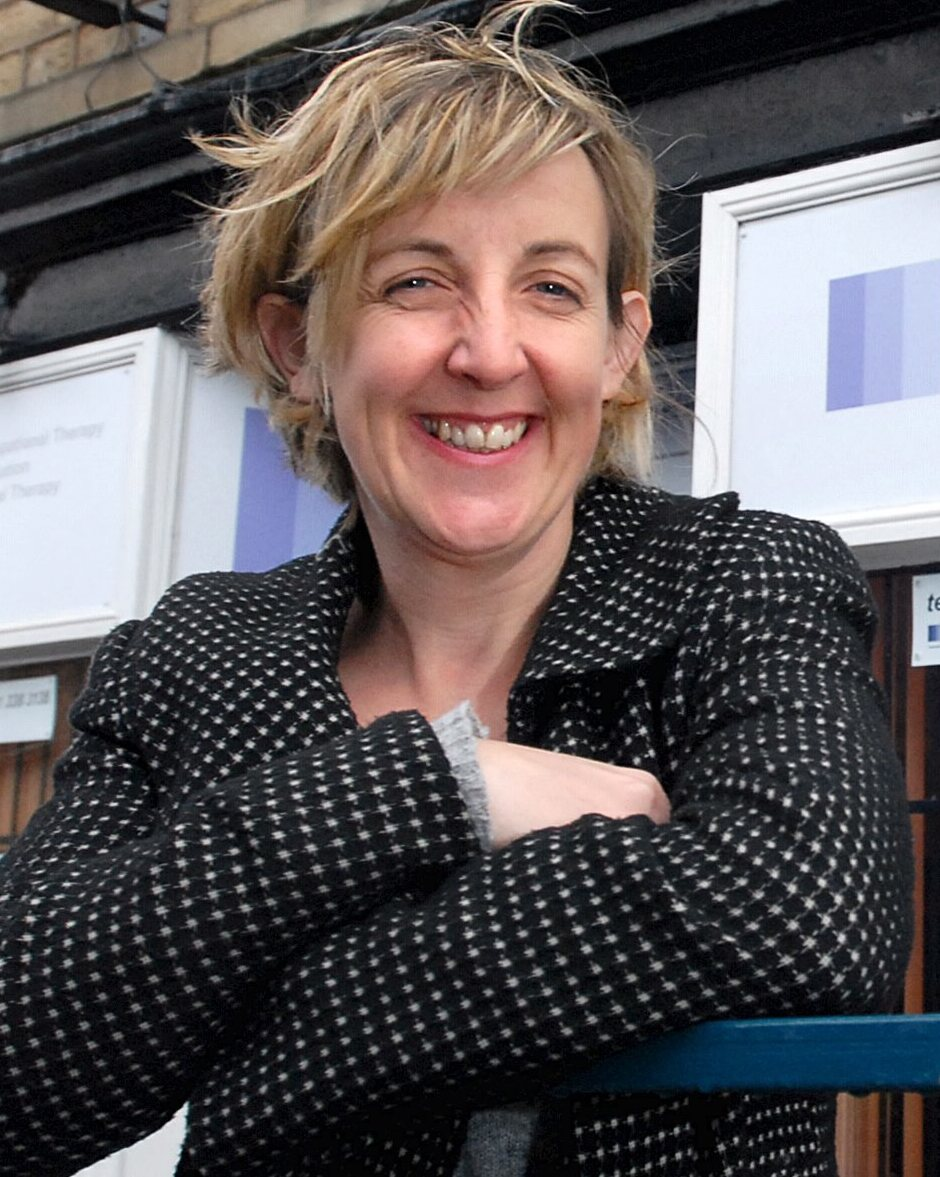
Julie Hesmondhalgh

Rob Beckett

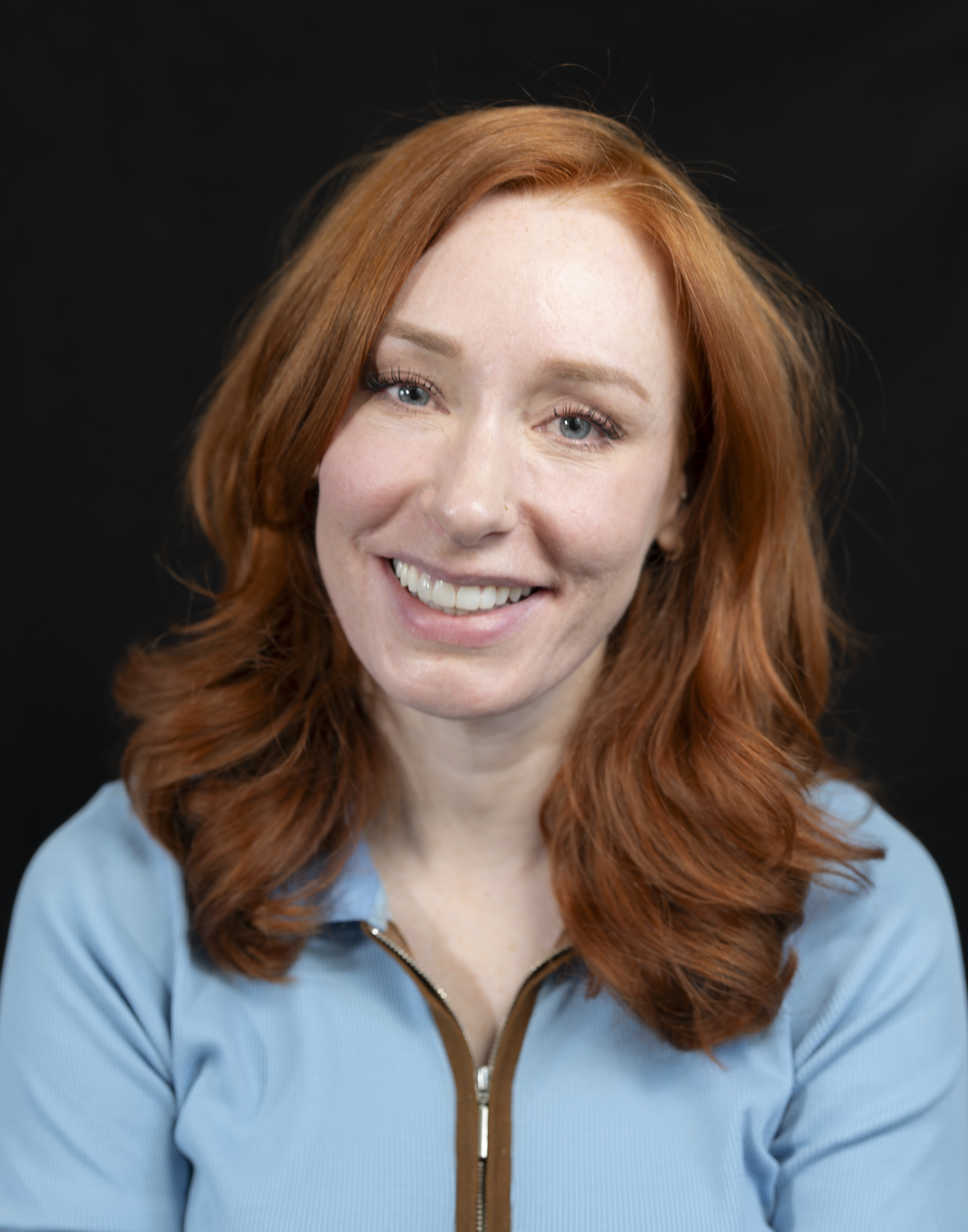
Hannah Fry

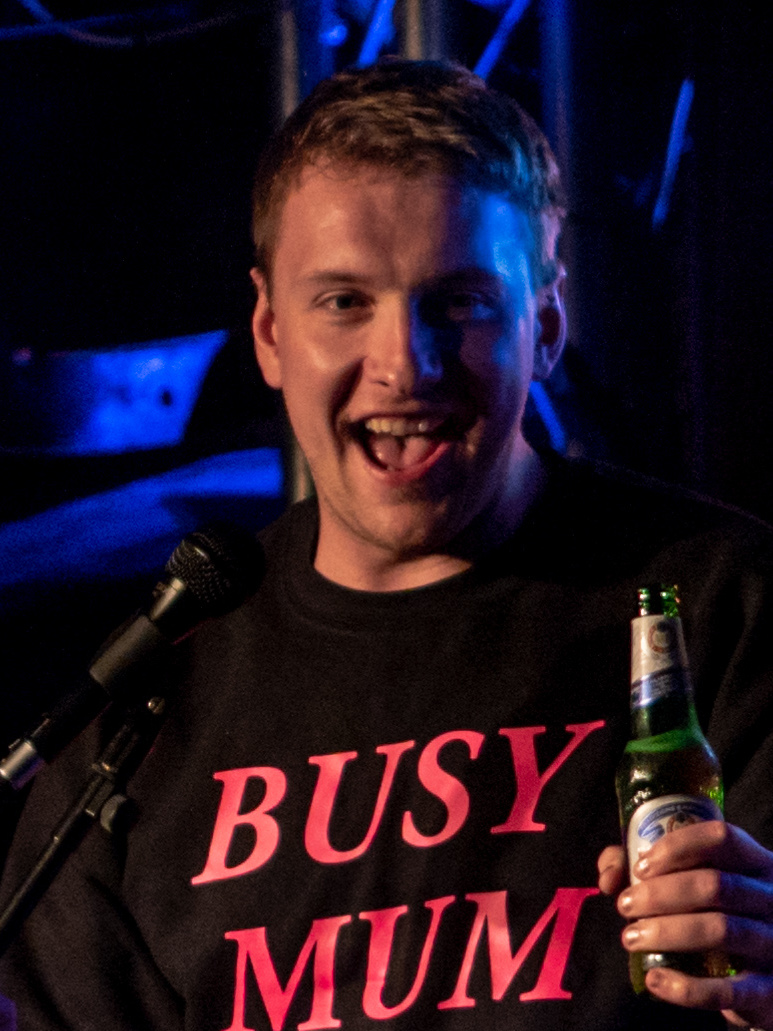
Joe Lycett

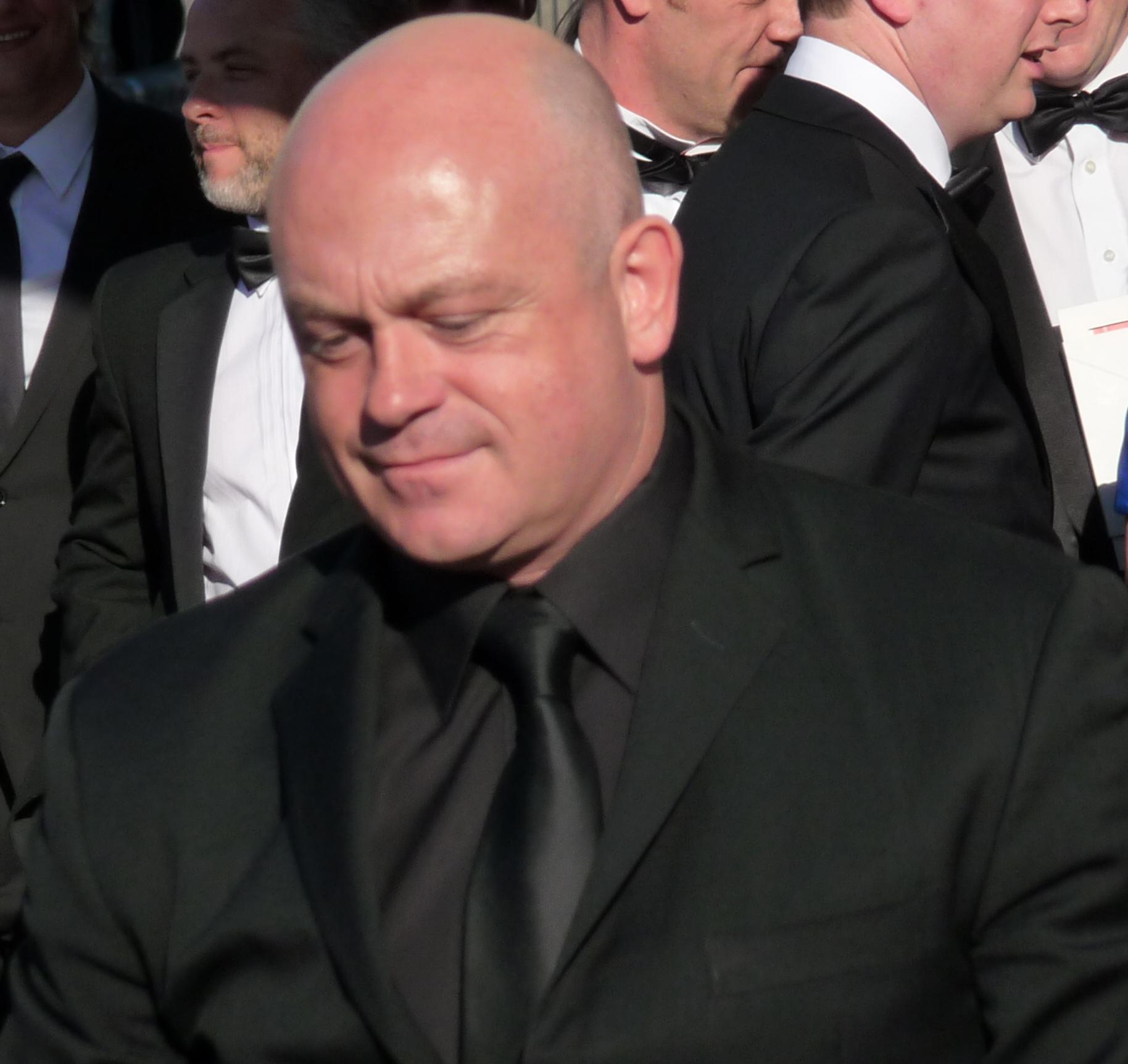
Ross Kemp

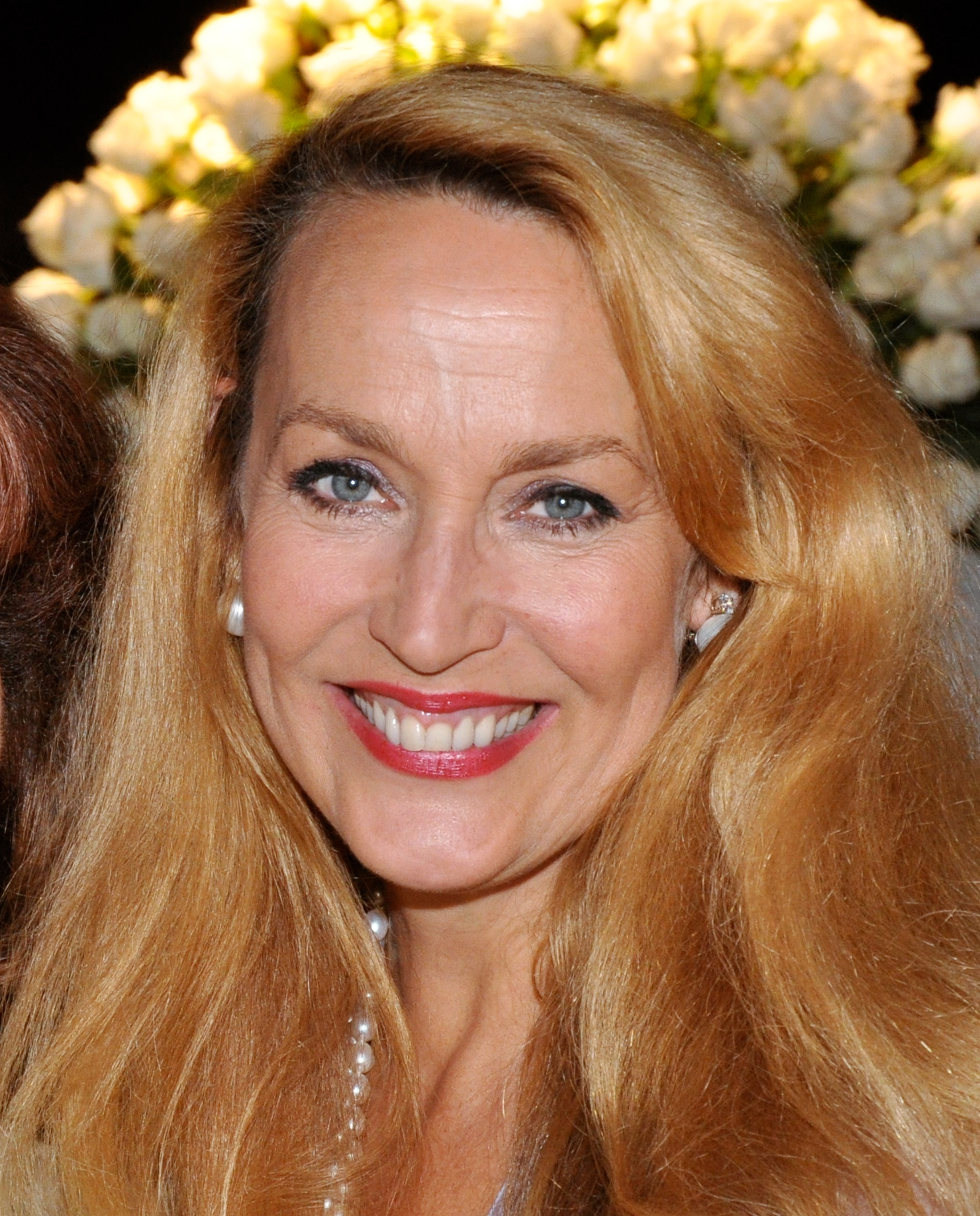
Jerry Hall

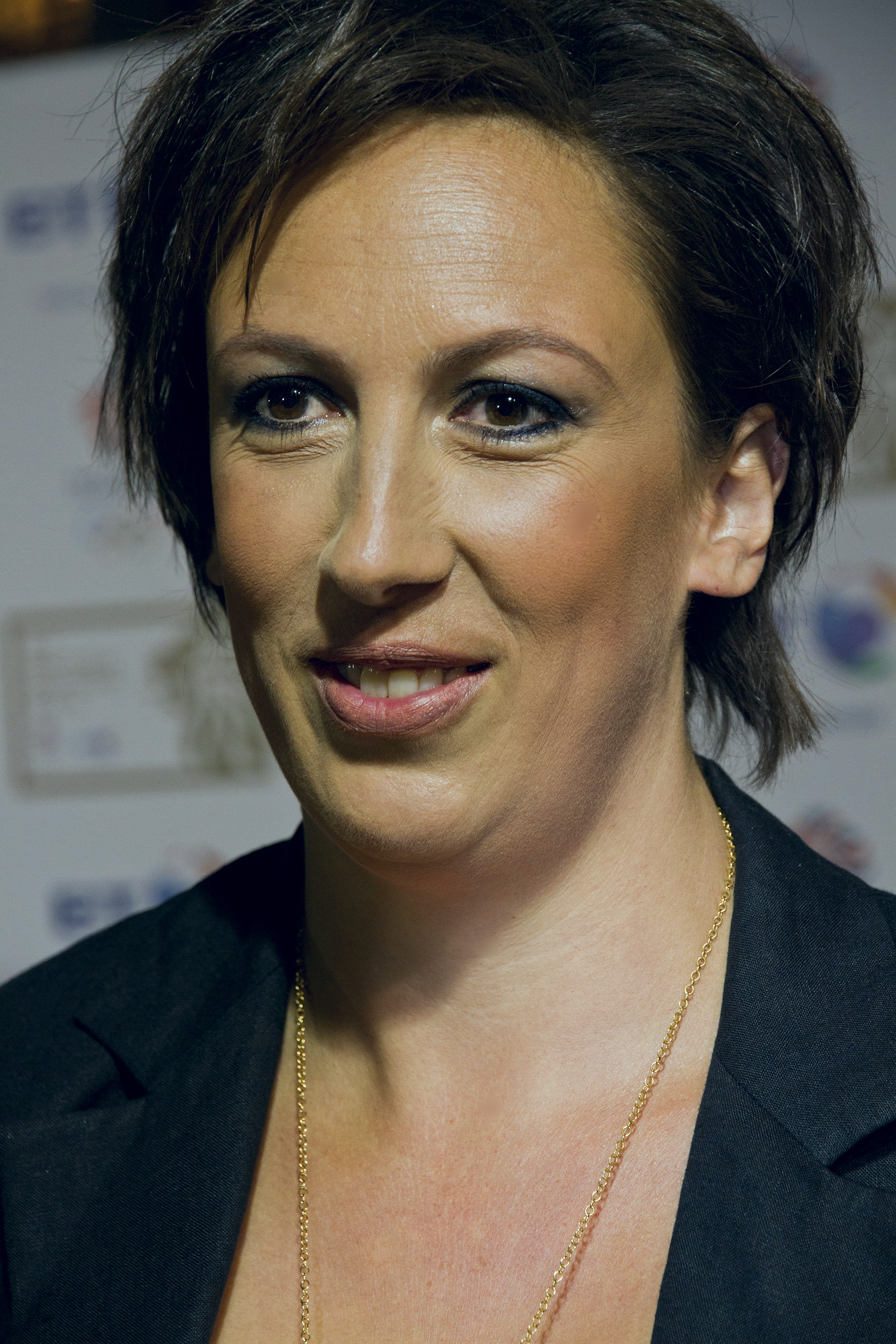
Miranda Hart

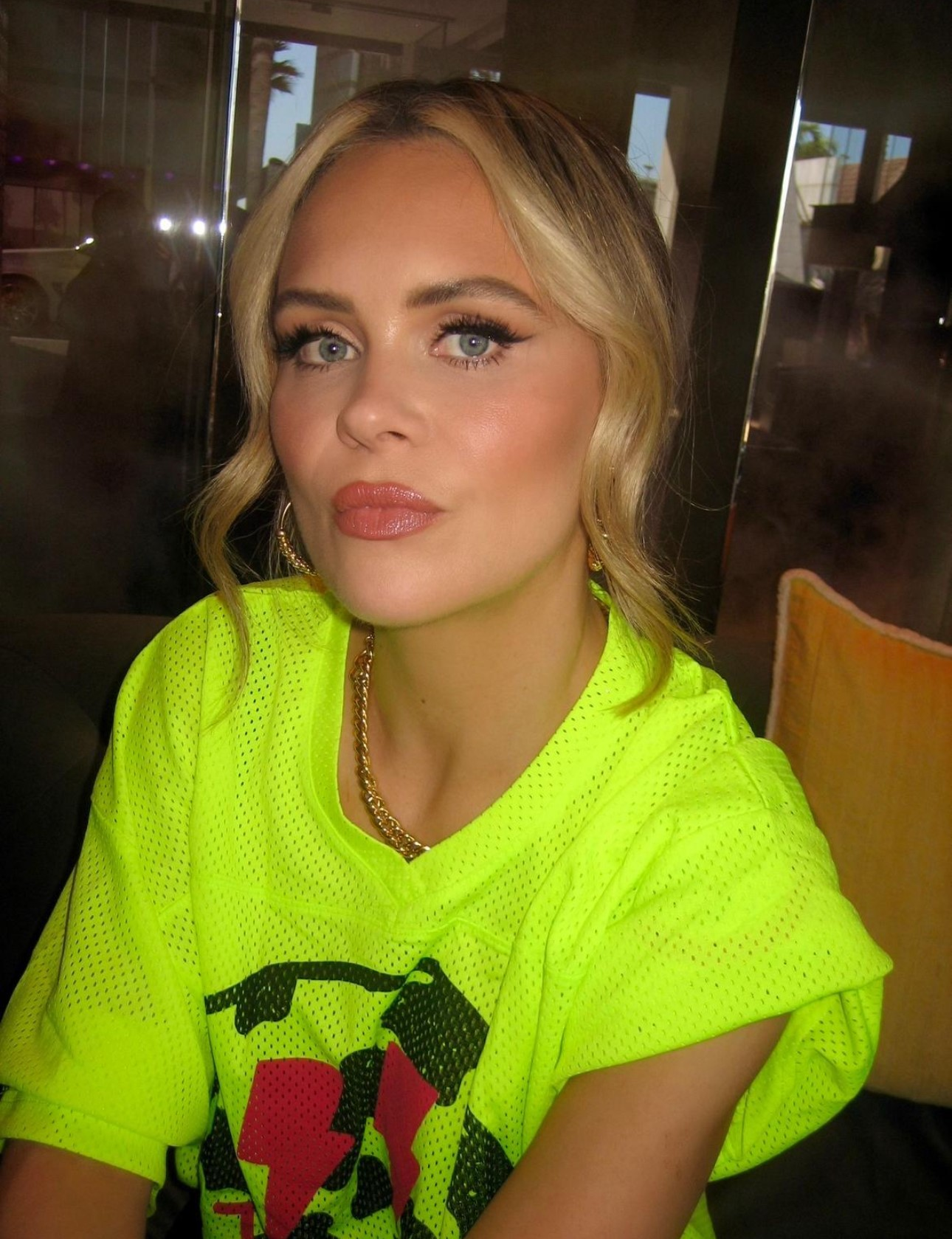
Joanne McNally

James Acaster

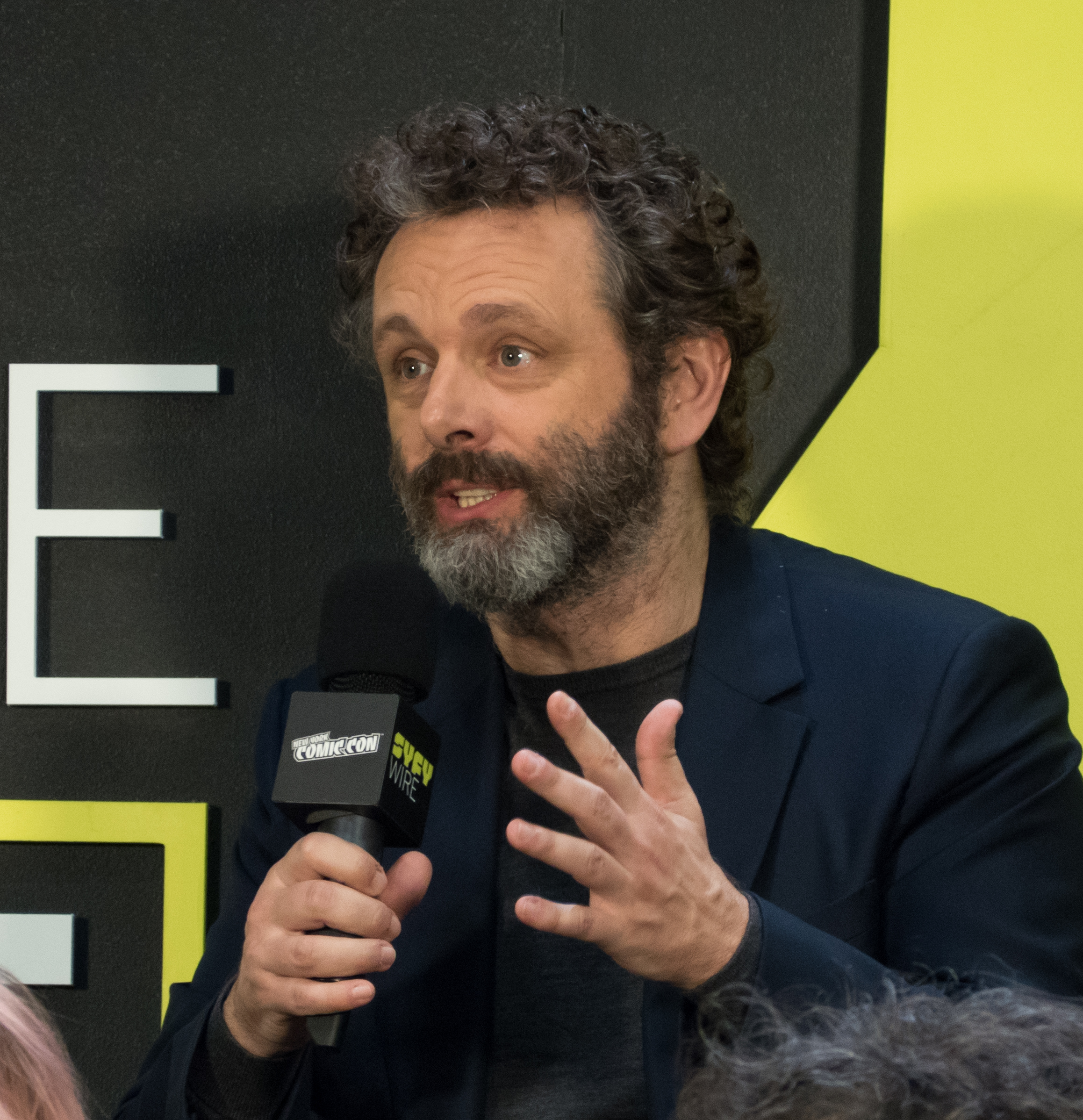
Michael Sheen

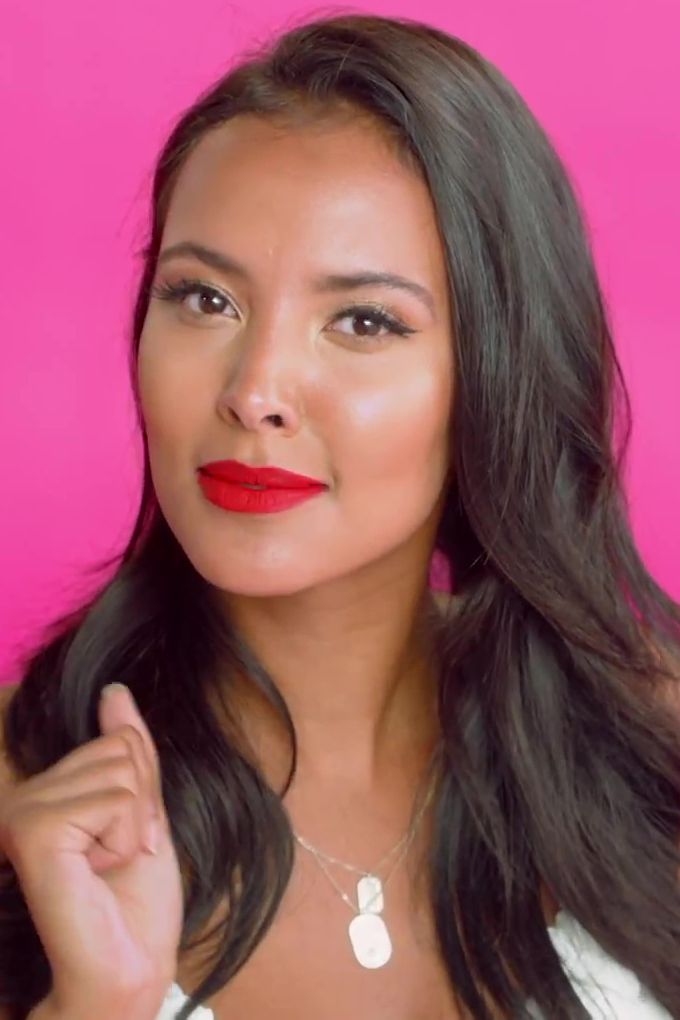
Maya Jama

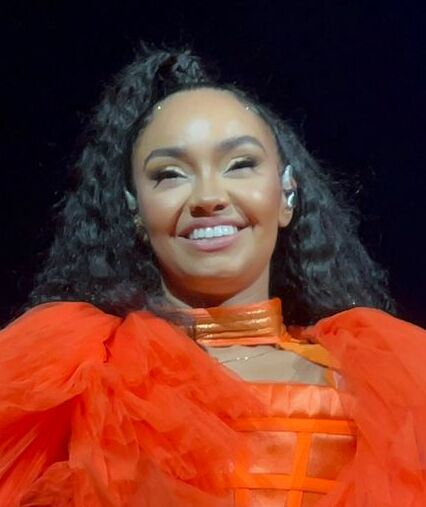
Leigh-Anne Pinnock

James Blunt

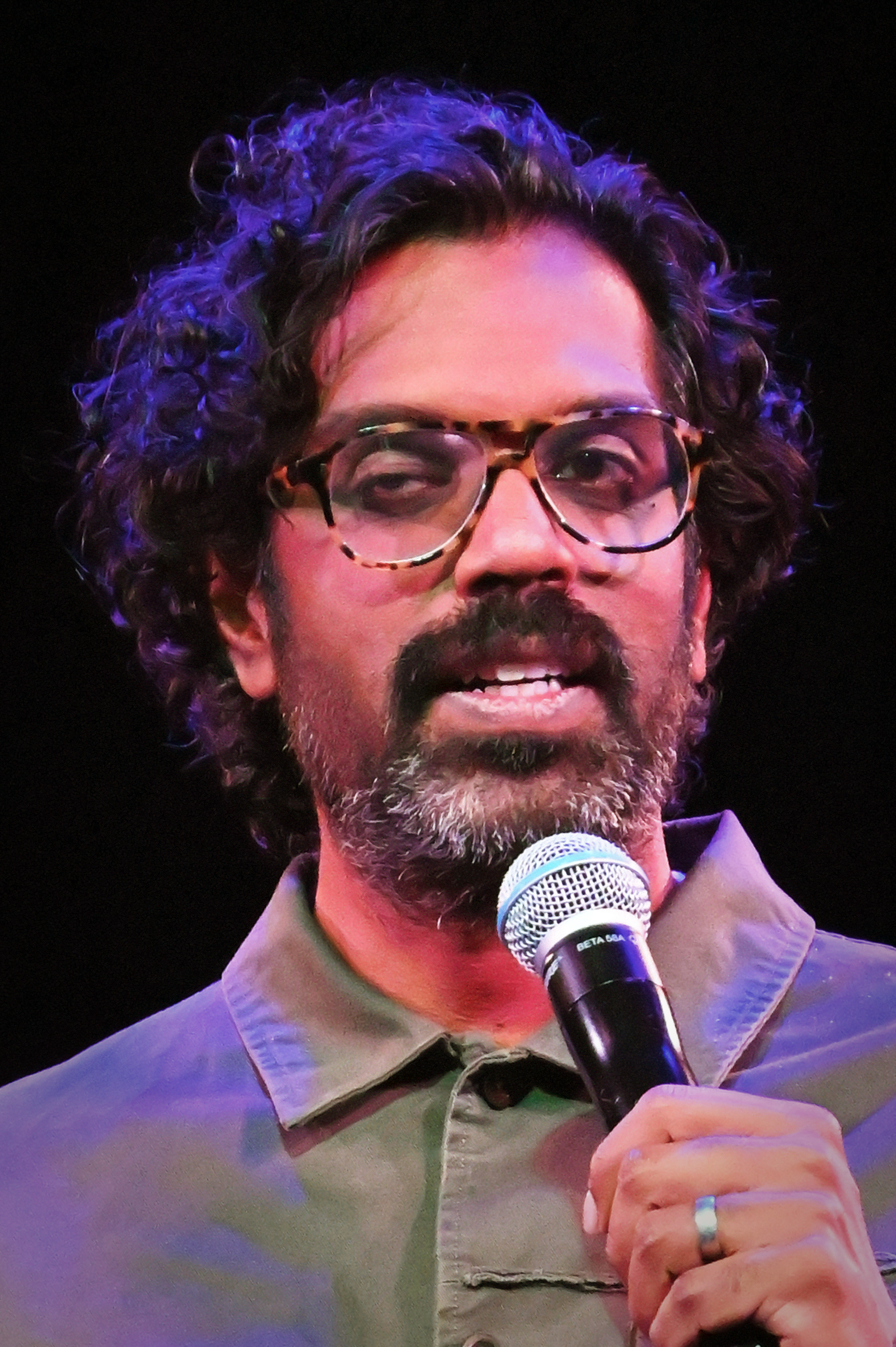
Romesh Ranganathan

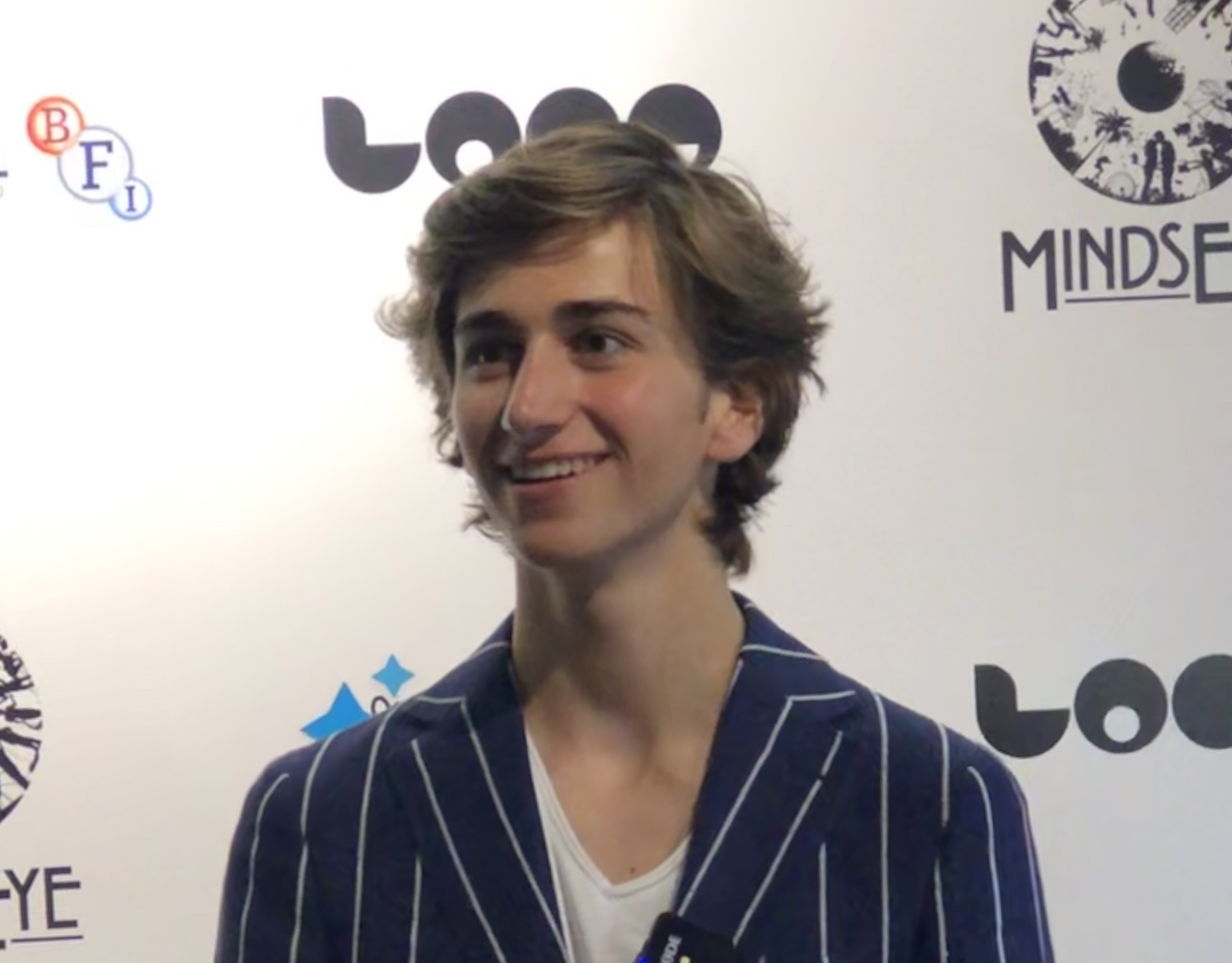
Sebastian Croft

Not pictured: Amol Rajan, Sharon Rooney and King Kenny.

List of The Celebrity Traitors contestants
Contestant	Age (Note: As shown on screen)	Notability	Chosen charity	Affiliation	Finish
Amol Rajan	43	Journalist & broadcaster	The Louis Dundas Centre of Great Ormond Street Hospital	Faithful	Murdered (Episode 2)
Richard E. Grant	69	Actor & author	Longfield Community Hospice	Traitor	Banished (Episode 3)
Myha'la	30	Actor	Ford Foundation	Faithful	Banished (Episode 3)
Bella Ramsey	23	Actor	Bamboozle Theatre Company	Faithful	Murdered (Episode 4)
Julie Hesmondhalgh	56	Actor	Reubens' Retreat	Faithful	Banished (Episode 4)
Rob Beckett	40	Comedian	Matt Palmer Trust	Faithful	Murdered (Episode 5)
Hannah Fry	42	Broadcaster & mathematician	Alzheimer's Society	Traitor (Note: Hannah was recruited as a Traitor in Episode 3.)	Banished (Episode 5)
Joe Lycett	38	Comedian	Tamworth Wellbeing and Cancer Support Centre	Faithful	Banished (Episode 6)
Ross Kemp	62	Actor & presenter	Haemophilia Society	Faithful	Murdered (Episode 7)
Jerry Hall	70	Model & actor	King's Trust	Faithful	Banished (Episode 7)
Miranda Hart	53	Actor & author	Astriid	Faithful	Murdered (Episode 8)
Joanne McNally	43	Comedian	UNICEF	Faithful	Banished (Episode 9)
Sharon Rooney	37	Actor	Robin House Children's Hospice	Faithful	Murdered (Episode 9)
James Acaster	41	Comedian & podcaster	Friends of the Earth Charitable Trust	Traitor (Note: James A. was recruited as a Traitor in Episode 2.)	Banished (Episode 9)
Michael Sheen	57	Actor & presenter	Tŷ Hafan	Faithful	Murdered (Episode 10)
Maya Jama	32	Broadcaster & entrepreneur	Action for Children	Traitor	Banished (Episode 10)
Leigh-Anne Pinnock	34	Singer/Songwriter	British Red Cross Society	Faithful	Banished (Episode 10)
King Kenny	29	Content creator	Rethink Mental Illness	Traitor (Note: Kenny was recruited as a Traitor in Episode 5.)	Banished (Episode 10)
James Blunt	52	Singer/Songwriter	Blue Marine Foundation	Faithful	Banished (Episode 10)
Romesh Ranganathan	48	Comedian	Refugee Council	Faithful	Winner (Episode 10)
Sebastian Croft	24	Musician & actor	Choose Love	Faithful	Winner (Episode 10)

== Elimination history ==
Key

The contestant was a Faithful.
The contestant was a Traitor.
The contestant was ineligible to vote.
The contestant was murdered by the Traitors.
The contestant was banished at the round table.

Episode	1	2			3		4		5		6	7	8		9		10
Traitors' Decision	Amol, James A.	Amol	James A.	Ross	Hannah		Bella	Leigh-Anne, Rob, Romesh, Ross	Rob	Kenny	None	Ross (Note: This murder took place in plain sight, with the Traitors spraying a room with perfume, then making a Faithful yawn with them in that room to inhale the lethal perfume. Ross yawned, to which James A. said "Sorry Ross, am I boring you?".)	Miranda	Kenny	Sharon		Michael
Traitors' Decision	Shortlist (Note: The Traitors were asked to choose two players to have the opportunity to plead their case and be recruited as a Traitor. Whoever was not selected by the Traitors would be murdered. Maya and Richard both chose Amol and James A.)	Murder	Recruit	Shield (Note: The Traitors were asked to give one player a shield. They chose Ross. Romesh was also given a shield as he was Ross's teammate.)	Seduce (Note: After Richard's banishment, James A. and Maya decided to offer Hannah the opportunity to become a Traitor. She accepted their offer.)		Murder	Shortlist (Note: The Traitors were asked to choose four players to play a game of Hide & Seek. Each player had to run and hide in a named crypt in the woods. The Traitors then had to decide which player would be murdered face to face. One player was eligible for a key to lock their crypt to prevent being murdered. Leigh-Anne was chosen by Rob, Romesh and Ross to receive the key.)	Murder	Seduce (Note: After Hannah's banishment, James A. and Maya decided to offer Kenny the opportunity to become a Traitor. He accepted their offer.)	None	Murder		Dagger (Note: At the end of the mission, one player was awarded The Dagger, making their vote count twice at the next round table. The Dagger was granted to Kenny by James A. and Maya.)	Murder		
Immune	Joe, Julie (Note: Julie was nominated by her fellow players as the most trustworthy. She was given two shields. She chose herself and Joe.)	Bella & James A., James B. & Rob, Joanne & Maya, Joe & Julie, Kenny & Richard, Leigh-Anne & Myha'la, Michael & Miranda, Romesh & Ross, Sebastian & Sharon			Maya, ~~Myha'la,~~; ~~Sharon~~ (Note: Myha'la and Sharon sacrificed their shields in the third mission to win money for the prize fund.)		Kenny, Sebastian	Leigh-Anne	None		Maya	James A., James B., Joanne, Michael	None				
Banishment	None				Richard	Myha'la	Julie		Hannah		Joe	Jerry	Tie		Joanne	James A.	Maya
Vote	None				16–2–1–1	13–4–1–1	9–6–1–1		12–1–1–1		11–1–1–1	9–1–1–1	4–4–1–1–1		5–4	7–1	4–2
Romesh	No vote				Richard	Myha'la	Hannah		James B.		Joe	Jerry	Michael		Joanne	James A.	Maya
Sebastian	No vote				Richard	Myha'la	Hannah		Hannah		Joe	Jerry	Joanne		Joanne	James A.	Maya
James B.	No vote				Hannah	Myha'la	Julie		Hannah		Joe	Jerry	Sharon		Sharon	James A.	Maya
Kenny	No vote				Richard	Jerry	Hannah		Hannah		Joe	Sebastian	Sharon (2)		Joanne (2) (Note: Episode 8 ended before Kenny's deciding double vote was revealed making it carry over into episode 9.)	James A.	Maya
Leigh-Anne	No vote				Richard	Jerry	Hannah		Hannah		Joe	Jerry	Joanne		Sharon	James A.	Romesh
Maya	No vote				Richard	Jerry	Julie		Hannah		Joe	Jerry	Sebastian		Sharon	James A.	Romesh
Michael	No vote				Richard	Myha'la	Julie		Hannah		Joe	Jerry	Sharon		Sharon	James A.	Murdered (Episode 10)
James A.	No vote				Richard	Michael	Julie		Hannah		Joanne	Jerry	Joanne		Joanne	Michael (Note: During the round table, James A. disclosed that he was a Traitor and was unanimously banished. His vote for Michael was not shown but was visible in images provided to the press.)	Banished (Episode 9)
Sharon	No vote				Richard	Myha'la	Julie		Hannah		Joe	Leigh-Anne	Joanne		No vote (Note: The first round of voting resulted in a tie. Per the rules, a second vote was held where the players involved in the tie would not vote and the remaining players could only vote for those who tied.)	Murdered (Episode 9)	
Joanne	No vote				Leigh-Anne	Jerry	Julie		Sebastian		Joe	Jerry	Leigh-Anne		No vote	Banished (Episode 9)	
Miranda	No vote				Richard	Myha'la	Julie		Hannah		Ross	Jerry	Murdered (Episode 8)				
Jerry	No vote				Leigh-Anne	Myha'la	Hannah		Hannah		Joe	Joanne	Banished (Episode 7)				
Ross	No vote				Richard	Myha'la	Julie		Hannah		Joe	Murdered (Episode 7)					
Joe	No vote				Richard	Myha'la	Hannah		Hannah		James B.	Banished (Episode 6)					
Hannah	No vote				Richard	Myha'la	Jerry		Jerry		Banished (Episode 5)						
Rob	No vote				Richard	Myha'la	Julie		Murdered (Episode 5)								
Julie	No vote				Richard	Myha'la	James B.		Banished (Episode 4)								
Bella	No vote				Richard	Myha'la	Murdered (Episode 4)										
Myha'la	No vote				Richard	Julie	Banished (Episode 3)										
Richard	No vote				Bella	Banished (Episode 3)											
Amol	No vote				Murdered (Episode 2)												

=== End game ===
Episode	10							
Decision	Banish	Leigh-Anne	Banish	Tie	Kenny	Banish	James B.	Game Over; Faithfuls Win
Vote	5–0	4–1	3–1	2–2	2–0	1–2	2–1	Game Over; Faithfuls Win
Romesh	Banish	Leigh-Anne	Banish	James B.	Kenny	End Game	James B.	Winners
Sebastian	Banish	Leigh-Anne	Banish	Kenny	Kenny	End Game	James B.	Winners
James B.	Banish	Leigh-Anne	Banish	Kenny	No vote	Banish	Romesh	Banished
Kenny	Banish	Leigh-Anne	End Game	James B.	No vote	Banished		
Leigh-Anne	Banish	Romesh	Banished					

== Missions ==
Episode	Task description	Time limit	Money earned	Money available	Running total	Shield winner(s)	
1	The mission took place at the wreck of the traitors' ship. Crates needed to be retrieved from the water and brought ashore. Three crates contained gold worth £3,000 apiece. Finding all the gold revealed a code to access the captain's safe, enabling an additional £6,000 to be banked.	25 minutes	£15,000	£15,000	£15,000 (of £15,000)	No shield on offer	
2	In this mission, players entered a graveyard containing multiple graves, some filled with gold valued at £1,000 and others concealing coffins in which players would be buried. Before the challenge began, contestants were required to form pairs. One player, selected by the Traitors along with their partner, was not buried. Instead, they were given a key and instructed to choose whether to dig up a pair of buried players or uncover a grave containing gold. Each excavated grave revealed an additional key. Any players remaining in coffins at the end of the mission were at risk of murder. Buried contestants could also call out the word "Haggis" to be released, though doing so also placed them and their partner at risk of murder.	15 minutes	£5,000	£10,000	£20,000 (of £25,000)	Bella	James A.
2		15 minutes	£5,000	£10,000	£20,000 (of £25,000)	James B.	Rob
2		15 minutes	£5,000	£10,000	£20,000 (of £25,000)	Joanne	Maya
2		15 minutes	£5,000	£10,000	£20,000 (of £25,000)	Joe	Julie
2		15 minutes	£5,000	£10,000	£20,000 (of £25,000)	Kenny	Richard
2		15 minutes	£5,000	£10,000	£20,000 (of £25,000)	Leigh-Anne	Myha'la
2		15 minutes	£5,000	£10,000	£20,000 (of £25,000)	Michael	Miranda
2		15 minutes	£5,000	£10,000	£20,000 (of £25,000)	Romesh	Ross
2		15 minutes	£5,000	£10,000	£20,000 (of £25,000)	Sebastian	Sharon
3	This mission took place within the castle grounds, where four crypts were situated. Each crypt contained varying amounts of gold and, in some cases, shields. Access to the crypts was only possible through the use of a battering ram. Entry was limited to two players, who were permitted to retrieve the available gold and shields. At the final crypt, two shields had to be sacrificed to release the remaining gold.	30 minutes	£6,000	£6,000	£26,000 (of £31,000)	Maya	
3	This mission took place within the castle grounds, where four crypts were situated. Each crypt contained varying amounts of gold and, in some cases, shields. Access to the crypts was only possible through the use of a battering ram. Entry was limited to two players, who were permitted to retrieve the available gold and shields. At the final crypt, two shields had to be sacrificed to release the remaining gold.	30 minutes	£6,000	£6,000	£26,000 (of £31,000)	~~Myha'la~~	
3	This mission took place within the castle grounds, where four crypts were situated. Each crypt contained varying amounts of gold and, in some cases, shields. Access to the crypts was only possible through the use of a battering ram. Entry was limited to two players, who were permitted to retrieve the available gold and shields. At the final crypt, two shields had to be sacrificed to release the remaining gold.	30 minutes	£6,000	£6,000	£26,000 (of £31,000)	~~Sharon~~	
4	The mission was set at Claudia's cabin, which was haunted by four spirits. Players were split into two teams. One team was responsible for summoning the spirits, while the other team was tasked with fulfilling each spirit's dying wish by interpreting clues and presenting a treasured item. £1,500 was awarded for each correct item. If an incorrect item was presented, the player offering it was taken by the spirit and removed from the mission.	No time limit	£4,500	£6,000	£30,500 (of £37,000)	Kenny	
4	The mission was set at Claudia's cabin, which was haunted by four spirits. Players were split into two teams. One team was responsible for summoning the spirits, while the other team was tasked with fulfilling each spirit's dying wish by interpreting clues and presenting a treasured item. £1,500 was awarded for each correct item. If an incorrect item was presented, the player offering it was taken by the spirit and removed from the mission.	No time limit	£4,500	£6,000	£30,500 (of £37,000)	Sebastian	
5	Players were required to transport two carts containing gold through three sequential gates, each of which had to be unlocked by solving a mechanism or puzzle. Throughout the task, the group was pursued by a procession referred to as the "Death Parade". Any participant caught by the parade was seized until the round table that night. To halt the parade, players had to reach the end of the course and ignite a line of fire. Only gold taken across the finish line was added to the prize fund.	No time limit	£8,000	£8,000	£38,500 (of £45,000)	No shield on offer	
6	The players were split into two groups. Each group had to work their way along a path where they would find questions about their fellow players with two possible answers. These answers were based on questionnaires answered by every player earlier that day. If they got an answer correct, they would receive a head to place on the bodies at the end of the path. Whichever team assembled the most statues would receive a shield to give to someone on their team.	45 minutes	£7,500	£9,000	£46,000 (of £54,000)	Maya	
7	In the Traitors' Lair, players were required to assemble their own shields on individual podiums using multiple pieces collected from troughs. Any player who completed their shield earned immunity from the next murder. At intervals signalled by the castle bell, players had to stop and put on a blindfold. While the Faithful were blindfolded, the Traitors took their blindfolds off and were permitted to remove two pieces from any player's shield. The Traitors also had to construct a separate "money shield". If completed, £9,000 was added to the prize fund, but failure to finish it resulted in no money being banked.	Not shown	£0	£9,000	£46,000 (of £63,000)	James A.	
7		Not shown	£0	£9,000	£46,000 (of £63,000)	James B.	
7		Not shown	£0	£9,000	£46,000 (of £63,000)	Joanne	
7		Not shown	£0	£9,000	£46,000 (of £63,000)	Michael	
8	The mission took place in a field of scarecrows, referred to by Claudia as the "Field of Screams". Each player was assigned a named scarecrow topped with a pumpkin head and a pitchfork. Additional scarecrows concealed gold bags worth £500 each, with a total of £13,500 available. Working in pairs, one player searched the scarecrows for gold while the other was responsible for banking it by hanging the bags on pitchforks. Whenever three bags were hung on a pitchfork, the corresponding scarecrow was detonated. The three players whose scarecrows were not detonated had the opportunity to give a player of their choice an extraordinary power: The dagger, with the ability to cast two votes at the next Round Table.	No time limit	£13,500	£13,500	£59,500 (of £76,500)	No shield on offer	
9	The players were divided into two teams, with one group confined to the castle laboratory and the other positioned in the castle gardens. The challenge centred on reuniting the severed heads of "murdered" celebrities with their corresponding bodies buried in the grounds. The laboratory team was required to trigger a final, amplified scream by passing an electrical current through the head. They then had to memorise the sound before lowering the head down the castle wall while relaying the scream to the garden team. The team in the gardens was tasked with matching the transmitted scream to the one emanating from the correct grave. There were five heads to be reunited, worth £1,000 each.	30 minutes	£5,000	£5,000	£64,500 (of £81,500)	No shield on offer	
10	The players were split into two teams, with one half travelling in a helicopter and the other in buggies on the ground. Their objective was to locate and destroy two bunkers in order to secure £18,500. The ground team was responsible for correctly identifying the bunkers with the cash inside them. Meanwhile, the helicopter team had to retrieve and deliver the dynamite and detonator separately, requiring two players to fast-rope from the aircraft to complete the task. The final detonator was located on a pontoon in the middle of the lake; one player from the helicopter team was dropped into the water and had to swim to the detonator.	60 minutes	£18,500	£18,500	£83,000 (of £100,000)	No shield on offer	

== Episodes ==
No. overall	No. in series	Title	Original release date	UK viewers (millions)
10	1	"Episode 1"	1 October 2026	15.41
After the contestants meet in the Traitors Church, Julie is deemed by the group as the most trustworthy and given two shields to distribute – she chooses to keep one for herself and gives the other to Joe. At the Round Table, Claudia selects Maya and Richard as Traitors, but warns the players that the Traitor team is not yet complete. When asked by Joe, Richard states he is a Traitor, startling the Faithfuls. After meeting in the turret for the first time, the Traitors are informed that they must summon two players tomorrow, with one becoming a Traitor and the other being murdered. The next day, the players succeed in their first mission, earning the full £15,000. Ross is suspicious of being murdered in plain sight by Bella – who placed a captain's hat on his head during the mission – and Leigh-Anne. Amol and James A. question Richard about his offhand comment, but Richard deflects by claiming he was joking and just disappointed. The Traitors summon Amol and James A. to the church, where they each plead their case to be recruited. As Amol and James A. lie in coffins, Maya and Richard make their decision.
11	2	"Episode 2"	2 October 2026	14.95
The Traitors choose to recruit James A. and murder Amol. Some players suspect Ross as being recruited after he was not murdered, which Maya encourages. Julie considers James A. as a potential recruit, Sebastian thinks Maya would be a good Traitor, and other players are still suspicious of Richard, who is asked many times about his statement that he was a Traitor the day before. James A. is nervous as a Traitor and states he cannot defend Richard too much without outing himself. The players form pairs ahead of the mission. For the graveyard mission, the Traitors select Ross (and, by extension, his partner Romesh) to begin on the surface. Alongside banking £5,000, the players succeed in digging everyone up except Jerry and Hannah (due to Jerry quitting early), leaving them as the only players up for murder. At the Round Table, suspicions fall on Julie (as choosing her as the most trustworthy could have been the players inadvertently picking a Traitor), Leigh-Anne (for touching up her make-up before leaving the castle), and Richard. While Joanne and Jerry defend him, pressure grows on Richard before the vote is held.
12	3	"Episode 3"	8 October 2026	15.36
Richard is banished by a near unanimous vote (including both Maya and James A. voting for him). Because Myha'la defended Richard, reneged on her argument by voting for him, and winked at him when she put her slate up, she falls under suspicion. Instead of murdering, the Traitors decide to seduce Hannah and she accepts their offer, joining them in the turret. The next day, the Faithfuls are stunned when both Jerry and Hannah enter breakfast, but surmise that a recruitment has happened. Miranda immediately suspects Hannah, while others suspect Jerry. During the mission, Myha'la and Hannah compete for a shield which Myha'la takes. Sharon and Maya also collect shields but the last gold chest requires two to be sacrificed. After some hesitation, Myha'la and Sharon give up their shields and the full £6,000 is banked. At the Round Table, suspicion primarily falls on Jerry (for not acknowledging her and Hannah's survival at breakfast) and Myha'la (for switching her vote). Myha'la is banished and reveals herself as a Faithful. After the round table, Miranda states she is certain Hannah is a recruited Traitor. The Traitors reconvene and discuss who to murder, settling on either James B., Bella, or Sebastian.
13	4	"Episode 4"	9 October 2026	15.05
The Traitors choose to murder Bella, surprising the Faithful and increasing tension in the group. Julie's strong reaction makes some players suspicious, while Miranda continues to doubt Hannah. Jerry suspects James A. but is not taken seriously. In the mission, Sebastian and Kenny win shields as the group earns £4,500. Hannah hesitates when given an opportunity to take a shield, making Kenny wary of her. Joanne and James B. become convinced Julie is a Traitor, while Rob agrees with Miranda's doubts about Hannah but wants to vote for Julie first. At the Round Table, suspicion focuses on Hannah's changed behaviour and Julie being chosen as the most trustworthy. Despite support from Romesh and Hannah, Julie is banished by a close vote and reveals she is a Faithful, shifting suspicion onto James B. That night, Claudia tells the Traitors they will not murder normally but instead choose four players to play hide-and-seek in crypts. They select Rob, Ross, Leigh‑Anne, and Romesh, before learning they will be murdering face-to-face. The chosen four discover that one crypt can be locked with a key, protecting them from murder. The others decide Leigh‑Anne should have the key before running and hiding in their crypts to await the Traitors.
14	5	"Episode 5"	15 October 2026	15.29
The Traitors murder Rob face-to-face. At breakfast, the Faithfuls are surprised by the decision and suspicions fall on Ross as a potential Traitor among the four hide-and-seek players. Other suspicions fall on Hannah and James B., while Sebastian is suspicious of James A. In the mission, the players bank the full £8,000. As part of the mission, six players must be sacrificed and kept isolated until the Round Table. James A., Romesh, Maya, Jerry, Joanne, and Hannah are sacrificed. Maya realises that the Traitors have unwittingly made a mistake, with all three of them now unable to influence the Faithfuls in the castle. At the Round Table, suspicions predominantly fall on Hannah, led by Miranda, Sebastian, and Kenny. She is banished by a near unanimous vote, with both other Traitors – Maya and James A. – voting for her. She reveals she is a Traitor. Afterwards, some suspicion falls on Joanne after she unintentionally implied she had been at the face-to-face murder. Joe openly begs for the Traitors to recruit him now that a spot is available. That night, the Traitors discuss recruiting either Joanne, Kenny, or Joe. They choose Kenny, who accepts the offer.
15	6	"Episode 6"	16 October 2026	15.53
The next day, the Faithful realise that a recruitment has happened. Suspicions immediately land on Joe, while others suspect Joanne after a gaffe at the Round Table. In the mission, the players bank £7,500 and Maya earns the shield. Jerry was voted ‘The One With Their Head in the Clouds’, Romesh was voted as having ‘The Best Poker Face’, and Michael was voted ‘Leader of the Round Table’ – which worries him that he is being too prominent. Ross and Leigh-Anne suspect each other after the hide-and-seek murder. At the Round Table, suspicions fall on Joanne (for her slip-up and chaotic voting record), Ross (for constantly being picked for special roles by the Traitors), and Joe (for openly wanting to be a Traitor, and suggesting the Traitors would be forced to recruit if he left, unintentionally implying he was a Traitor). Joe is banished in a near-unanimous vote and reveals he is a Faithful. Afterwards, the Traitors are told they must murder in plain sight by spraying a perfume and getting someone to yawn in the same room. Kenny sprays the perfume but later leaves the room as Maya and James A. try to get Ross and Jerry to yawn.
16	7	"Episode 7"	22 October 2026	15.50
Ross yawns and is murdered in plain sight. The next day, Michael suspects Leigh-Anne had been distracting the Faithful when she taught Miranda a dance the night before. Kenny tries to plant the idea that Sebastian killed Ross in the bar. During the mission, the Traitors attempt to sneakily form a shield to bank money while the Faithful are blindfolded. James A. does not even lift his blindfold, frustrating Maya and Kenny. Despite making some progress, Maya and Kenny ultimately become nervous about being heard and fail to complete the shield, so no money is banked. Four players earn shields. Miranda suspects Joanne and Maya of moving around during the mission, which Joanne refutes. Sharon remembers James A. theorising the use of the perfume bottles in a murder in plain sight when he was still a Faithful. The players discuss this theory, but decide Ross would have noticed and mentioned it. At the Round Table, suspicions fall on Leigh-Anne, Joanne, Sebastian, and Miranda, but nobody feels confident sharing their theories. Jerry is eventually banished for causing chaos and randomly throwing out names, and she reveals that she is a Faithful. After the Round Table, James B. suspects Sharon. In the turret, Kenny and Maya question James A. about refusing to help in the challenge and then supporting Sharon's correct perfume theory. The Traitors decide to murder either Miranda, Romesh, or Sebastian.
17	8	"Episode 8"	23 October 2026	15.30
The Traitors choose to murder Miranda. Suspicions fall on Joanne after she and Miranda accused one another, and Sharon for becoming more confident. Others wonder why Michael has not been murdered yet. In the mission, the players bank £13,500 and are told that they can choose three people to receive a special power. Unbeknownst to the Faithfuls, the players end up choosing all three Traitors (despite James A. saying he did not want the power). The power is revealed to be a dagger that represents a double vote at the Round Table. The Traitors choose to give the dagger to Kenny. Because Sharon tried to avoid giving the power to James A., she falls under suspicion. Sebastian and Romesh think that James B. and Michael are influencing the group to banish Sharon. At the Round Table, suspicion falls on several players but primarily on Michael, Sharon, and Joanne. The vote is split and results in a tie between Sharon and Joanne. Sharon and Joanne plead their cases and the episode ends before Kenny's deciding vote.
18	9	"Episode 9"	29 October 2026	15.54
Kenny switches his vote and Joanne is banished. The Traitors decide to murder Sharon to sow confusion. Realising he was wrong about Sharon, Michael decides to hone in on finding Traitors. Suspicions fall on James A. while Kenny and Sebastian suggest Michael could be a Traitor. James B. and Michael return to theorising on the murder in plain sight. Michael considers Maya and Kenny as Traitors who had teamed up. The players bank £5,000 in the mission. Romesh and Sebastian theorise Michael, James B., and especially Maya as being a Traitor trio. At the Round Table, Michael leads the discussion and invites accusation to test all theories. Eventually, despite suspicions on Michael, Leigh-Anne, and James B., the discussion flips to the murder in plain sight. Michael delivers a direct accusation of either Maya or James A. murdering Ross, with James A. being the most likely culprit. Having been caught out, James A. confesses to being a recruited Traitor, and to his delight, he is banished with a unanimous vote. After the Round Table, suspicions continue to fall on Maya. She realises Michael is her biggest threat but that murdering him will only point back to her.
19	10	"Finale"	30 October 2026	15.92
The Traitors choose to murder Michael because Maya knows she couldn't win if he remained. Sebastian and Romesh trust each other enough to finish the game together, while Leigh-Anne trusts Kenny and suspects Romesh. James B. suspects Maya and Kenny due to their presence at Ross's murder. In the mission, the players bank £18,500, bringing the final total in the prize pot to £83,000. Suspicion continues to fall on Maya, and Kenny doubts he can defend her without risking his own elimination. At the final Round Table, suspicion is split between Maya and Romesh, before Maya is banished with Kenny voting for her. At the Endgame, all players choose to banish again. Leigh-Anne is banished for several reasons, including voting for Romesh with Maya, as this could have been a Traitor voting bloc. All players except Kenny choose to banish again. Sebastian and James B. suspect Kenny, while Romesh suspects James B. because he dismissed Maya's parting remark. The vote is split between James B. and Kenny. After deliberation, Sebastian and Romesh choose to banish Kenny. Sebastian and Romesh choose to end the game, but James B. chooses to banish again because he now suspects Romesh for turning on him. James B. is banished. Romesh and Sebastian win the game as Faithfuls, splitting the prize pot and winning £41,500 each for their chosen charities, the Refugee Council and Choose Love respectively.

== Ratings ==
Weekly ratings for each show on BBC One. All ratings are provided by BARB.

Episode	Date	Official rating (millions)	Weekly rank for BBC One	Weekly rank for all UK TV
Episode 1	1 October	15.41	1	1
Episode 2	2 October	14.95	2	2
Episode 3	8 October	15.36	1	1
Episode 4	9 October	15.05	2	2
Episode 5	15 October	15.29	2	2
Episode 6	16 October	15.53	1	1
Episode 7	22 October	15.50	1	1
Episode 8	23 October	15.30	2	2
Episode 9	29 October	15.54	2	2
Episode 10	30 October	15.92	1	1
Series average	2026	15.39	—N/a	—N/a

== Reception ==
=== Critical reception ===
Some outlets commented on the lack of sportspeople compared to the previous series, which included Tom Daley, Clare Balding and finalist Joe Marler. In September 2026, The Times ranked Hesmondhalgh as most likely to win the series; however, she was banished in Episode 4.

The Guardian gave the final a 4/5 rating. The Times described it as 'extraordinary result after a sometimes underwhelming series'.
