= 2022 in Misfits Boxing =

Misfits Boxing
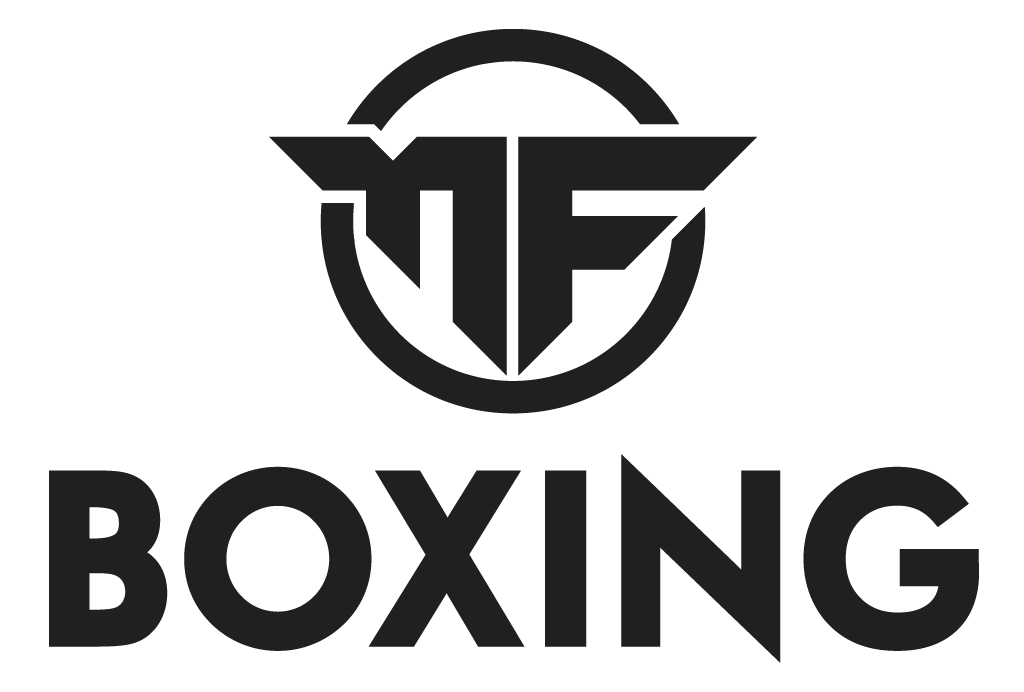

Information
- Promotion: Misfits Boxing
- First date: 27 August 2022
- Last date: 19 November 2022
- Website: misfitsboxing.com

Events
- Total events: 3

Fights
- Total fights: 21
- Title fights: 3

2022 in Misfits Boxing was the inaugural year in the history of Misfits Boxing, a crossover boxing promotion founded by English YouTuber KSI and run by Mams Taylor, Kalle Sauerland, and Nisse Sauerland. Misfits Boxing held 3 events in 2022.

== MF & DAZN: X Series 001 ==
MF & DAZN: X Series 001
- Date: 27 August 2022
- Venue: The O2 Arena, London, England
- Title on the line: inaugural MFB cruiserweight title

Tale of the tape
Boxer	KSI	Luis Alcaraz Pineda
Nickname	The Nightmare	El Flaco de Oro
Hometown	Watford, England	Empalme, Sonora, Mexico
Pre-fight record	2–0 (1 KO) (Note: On BoxRec, KSI's professional record is 1–0 and his MF-professional record is 1–0 (1 KOs).)	2–5
Height	6 ft 0 in (1.83 m)	6 ft 3 in (1.91 m)
Weight	179.9 lb (82 kg)	179 lb (81 kg)
Style	Orthodox	Orthodox
Recognition	MFB cruiserweight champion	

Result
- KSI defeated Luis Alcaraz Pineda via round 3 KO.

MF & DAZN: X Series 001, billed as 2 Fights 1 Night, was an MF–professional boxing event which featured KSI vs Luis Alcaraz Pineda, a cruiserweight match contested between English internet personality KSI and Mexican professional boxer Luis Alcaraz Pineda for the inaugural MFB cruiserweight title. The event took place at The O2 Arena in London on 27 August 2022. KSI defeated Pineda via knockout in the third round. The event reportedly sold 445,500 pay-per-view buys.

On the undercard, KSI also fought English rapper Swarmz as the opening bout as originally, KSI was set to face American YouTuber Alex Wassabi, who withdrew due to sustaining a concussion.

=== Background ===
On 5 May 2022, KSI announced on his socials his return to the ring after his 2 year hiatus for 27 August. Along with this announcement came the reveal of Misfits Boxing, a subsidiary promotion of Wasserman focusing on crossover boxing. On 1 July, DAZN accidentally leaked that KSI's opponent would be Alex Wassabi, as well as revealing Deji vs Fousey and FaZe Temperrr vs Blueface. On 15 July, KSI vs Wassabi was officially announced for The O2 Arena in London. However on 7 August Wassabi withdrew from the bout due to sustaining a concussion. The following day it was announced that Swarmz would be the replacement opponent.

On 17 August, following the online criticism KSI announced that he would be fighting twice, with his second opponent being Bulgarian professional boxer Ivan Nikolov (3–16–2). However, Nikolov was removed from the event due to his tattoos revealing he is a white supremacist and Neo-Nazi. Mexican professional boxer Luis Alcaraz Pineda (2–5) was announced as the replacement opponent.

=== Card ===
Weight class		vs		Method	Round	Time	Notes
Cruiserweight	KSI	def.	Luis Alcaraz Pineda	KO	3/3	0:50	^{Note 1}
Light heavyweight	Slim Albaher	def.	FaZe Temperrr	KO	2/4	2:20
Light heavyweight	Deji Olatunji	def.	Fousey	TKO	3/4	1:28
Cruiserweight	King Kenny	def.	FaZe Sensei	MD	4
Cruiserweight	Salt Papi	def.	Andy Warski	KO	1/3	0:29
Heavyweight	Sam Hyde	def.	IAmThmpsn	TKO	3/3	1:28
Welterweight	Deen the Great	def.	Evil Hero	TKO	1/3	2:53
Cruiserweight	KSI	def.	Swarmz	KO	2/3	0:28

^Note 1 For inaugural MFB cruiserweight title

=== Broadcast ===
The event was broadcast on DAZN PPV.

Country/Region	Broadcasters			
Country/Region	Free	Cable TV	PPV	Stream
United Kingdom (Host)	—N/a		DAZN PPV	
United States	—N/a		DAZN PPV	
Ireland	—N/a		DAZN PPV	
Canada	—N/a		DAZN PPV	
Worldwide	—N/a			DAZN

== MF & DAZN: X Series 002 ==
MF & DAZN: X Series 002
- Date: 15 October 2022
- Venue: Sheffield Arena, Sheffield, England

Tale of the tape
Boxer	Jay Swingler	Cherdleys
Hometown	Dudley, England	California, US
Pre-fight record	0–0	0–0
Height	5 ft 9 in (1.75 m)	5 ft 9 in (1.75 m)
Weight	166 lb (75 kg)	161 lb (73 kg)
Style	Orthodox	Orthodox

Result
- Swingler defeated Cherdleys via round 1 TKO.

MF & DAZN: X Series 002 was an MF–professional boxing event which featured Jay Swingler vs Cherdleys, a middleweight match contested between English YouTuber Jay Swingler and American YouTuber Cherdleys. The event took place at the Sheffield Arena in Sheffield on 15 October 2022. Swingler defeated Cherdleys via technical knockout in the first round.

=== Background ===
During the broadcast for MF & DAZN: X Series 001, it was announced that Hasim Rahman Jr. vs Vitor Belfort would headline X Series 002 in Sheffield Arena in Sheffield, England. Rahman Jr. vs Belfort was later rescheduled for X Series 003 for an unknown reason allowing Swingler vs Cherdleys to become the new headliner.

=== Card ===
Weight class		vs		Method	Round	Time	Notes
Middleweight	Jay Swingler	def.	Cherdleys	KO	1/4	1:10
Light heavyweight	Slim Albaher	def.	Ryan Taylor	UD	4		^{Note 1}
Bridgerweight	JMX	def.	Ginty	TKO	3/3	0:50
Middleweight	Astrid Wett	def.	Keeley Colbran	RTD	1/3	2:00
Cruiserweight	Anthony Taylor	def.	Ashley Rak-Su	UD	3
Heavyweight	Halal Ham	def.	DTG	UD	3

^Note 1 For inaugural MFB light heavyweight title

== MF & DAZN: X Series 003 ==
MF & DAZN: X Series 003
- Date: 19 November 2022
- Venue: Moody Center, Austin, Texas, US
- Title on the line: inaugural MFB lightweight championship

Tale of the tape
Boxer	Deen the Great	Walid Sharks
Hometown	Tampa, Florida, US	Baghdad, Iraq
Pre-fight record	1–0 (1 KO) (Note: On BoxRec, Deen the Great's professional record is 0–0 and his MF-professional record is 1–0 (1 KOs).)	0–0
Height	5 ft 5 in (1.65 m)	5 ft 6 in (1.68 m)
Weight	129 lb (59 kg)	127 lb (58 kg)
Style	Orthodox	Orthodox

Result
- Deen the Great defeated Sharks via round 3 TKO.

MF & DAZN: X Series 003 was a professional boxing event which featured Deen the Great vs. Walid Sharks, a lightweight match contested between American YouTuber Deen the Great and Iraqi Golden Gloves champion Walid Sharks for the vacant MFB lightweight title. The event took place on 19 November 2022 at the Moody Center in Austin, Texas, US. Deen the Great defeated Sharks via technical knockout in the third round.

=== Background ===
On 15 September 2022, it was announced that Hasim Rahman Jr. vs. Vitor Belfort would headlined MF & DAZN: X Series 003 at the Moody Center in Austin, Texas, US. However, on 14 November, Belfort withdrew after being tested positive for COVID-19. former American football defensive end and mixed martial artist Greg Hardy was announced as Belfort's replacement. Deen the Great vs. Walid Sharks was then promoted as the headline bout of X Series 003.

=== Card ===
Weight class		vs		Method	Round	Time	Notes
Lightweight	Deen the Great	def.	Walid Sharks	TKO	3/4	1:55	^{Note 1}^{,} ^{2}
Heavyweight	Josh Brueckner	def.	Chase DeMoor	RTD	2/4	3:00	^{Note 3}
Heavyweight	Greg Hardy	def.	Hasim Rahman Jr.	UD	4
Cruiserweight	King Kenny	def.	DK Money	KO	1/4	1:34	^{Note 4}
Cruiserweight	FaZe Temperrr	def.	Overtflow	KO	1/4	0:30	^{Note 5}
Light-heavyweight	Brandon Buckingham	def.	Ice Poseidon	TKO	1/4	2:13	^{Note 6}
Heavyweight	Malcolm Minikon	def.	NickNackPattiwack	DQ	4	1:40	^{Note 7}

^Note 1 Deen and Sharks' professional debut
^Note 2 For inaugural MFB lightweight title
^Note 3 DeMoor's professional debut
^Note 4 Kenny and Money's professional debut
^Note 5 Temperrr and Overtflow's professional debut
^Note 6 Poseidon and Buckingham's professional debut
^Note 7 Minikon and NickNackPattiwack's professional debut

== See also ==
- 2023 in Misfits Boxing
- 2024 in Misfits Boxing
- 2025 in Misfits Boxing
- 2026 in Misfits Boxing
