= Swindle (surname) =

Swindle is a surname. Notable people with the surname include:

- Christina Swindle (born 1984), American swimmer
- Clinton Howard Swindle (1945–2004), American investigative journalist and editor from Texas
- Gerald Swindle, American bass angler
- Liz Lemon Swindle, (born 1953), American painter
- Orson Swindle (born 1937), American Vietnam War veteran and government official

== See also ==
- Swindler (surname)
- Swindell
- Swindall
