= 2023 in Misfits Boxing =

Misfits Boxing
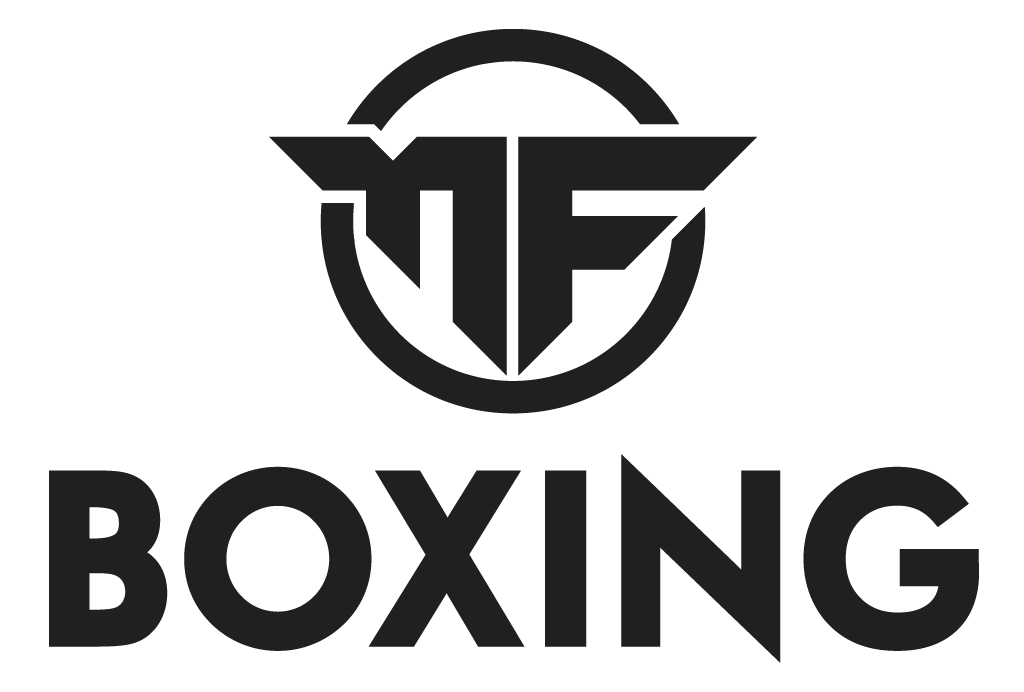

Information
- Promotion: Misfits Boxing
- First date: 14 January 2023
- Last date: 17 November 2023
- Website: misfitsboxing.com

Events
- Total events: 8

Fights
- Total fights: 66
- Title fights: 14

2023 in Misfits Boxing was the second year in the history of Misfits Boxing, a crossover boxing promotion founded by English YouTuber KSI and run by Mams Taylor, Kalle Sauerland, and Nisse Sauerland. Misfits Boxing held 8 events in 2023.

== MF & DAZN: X Series 004 ==
MF & DAZN: X Series 004 was an MF–professional boxing event which featured KSI vs FaZe Temperrr, a cruiserweight match contested between English internet personality KSI and Brazilian YouTuber FaZe Temperrr for the MFB cruiserweight title. The event took place on 14 January 2023 at Wembley Arena in London. KSI defeated Temperrr via knockout in the first round. The event reportedly sold 300,000 pay-per-view buys.

== MF & DAZN: X Series 005 ==
MF & DAZN: X Series 005
- Date: 4 March 2023
- Venue: Telford International Centre, Telford, England

Tale of the tape
Boxer	Jay Swingler	NichLmao
Hometown	Dudley, England	Singapore
Pre-fight record	1–0 (1 KO) (Note: On BoxRec, Swingler's professional record is 0–0 and his MF-professional record is 1–0 (1 KO).)	0–0
Height	5 ft 9 in (1.75 m)	5 ft 11 in (1.80 m)
Weight	163.8 lb (74 kg)	157.6 lb (71 kg)
Style	Orthodox	Orthodox

Result
- Swingler defeated NichLmao via Majority Decision. (39–36 Swingler, 39–37 Swingler, 38–38 draw)

MF & DAZN: X Series 005 was an MF–professional boxing event which featured Jay Swingler vs NichLmao, a middleweight match contested between English YouTuber Jay Swingler and Singaporean YouTuber NichLmao. The event took place on 4 March 2023 at the Telford International Centre in Telford. Swingler defeated NichLmao via majority decision.

=== Background ===
During the broadcast for MF & DAZN: X Series 004, it was announced that Swingler would face NichLmao on 25 February 2023 in Milton Keynes, England. It was later announced that the event had been postponed to 4 March to the Telford International Centre in Telford, due to clashes with Jake Paul vs Tommy Fury on the same date.

The event introduced 'tag team boxing' to the sport of boxing. The teams consisted of Los Pineda Coladas, which had Luis Alcaraz Pineda and BDave take on D-Generation Ice, which featured Anthony Vargas and Ice Poseidon. The rules stated that a boxer can tag-in their teammate once they get to their corner, scorecards are calculated based on the performance of the boxers in the ring as though both team members are one person and if an opponent gets knockout, then the opposing team will be crowned the winner.

=== Card ===
Weight class		vs		Method	Round	Time	Notes
Middleweight	Jay Swingler	def.	NichLmao	MD	4
Lightweight	Deen the Great (c)	def.	Pully Arif	UD	4		^{Note 1}
Cruiserweight	Ashley Rak-Su	def.	King Kenny	SD	4
Light heavyweight	Los Pineda Coladas (Luis Alcaraz Pineda & BDave)	def.	D-Generation Ice (Anthony Vargas & Ice Poseidon)	TKO	2/4	0:50	^{Note 2}
Lightweight	Astrid Wett	def.	AJ Bunker	MD	3		^{Note 3}
Cruiserweight	Ginty	def.	Halal Ham	UD	3
Heavyweight	Tempo Arts	def.	Godson Umeh	RTD	1/3	3:00

^Note 1 For MFB lightweight title
^Note 2 Tag team bout
^Note 3 For inaugural MFB women's lightweight title

== MF & DAZN: X Series 006 ==
MF & DAZN: X Series 006
- Date: 21 April 2023
- Venue: XULA Convocation Centre, New Orleans, Louisiana, US

Tale of the tape
Boxer	JMX	Le'Veon Bell
Nickname		The Juice
Hometown	Hertfordshire, England	Reynoldsburg, Ohio, U.S.
Pre-fight record	1–0 (1 KO) (Note: On BoxRec, JMX's professional record is 0–0 and his MF-professional record is 1–0 (1 KO).)	0–1
Height	6 ft 1 in (1.85 m)	6 ft 2 in (1.88 m)
Weight	194.8 lb (88 kg)	193.5 lb (88 kg)
Style	Southpaw	Orthodox

Result
- Bell defeated JMX via Unanimous Decision. (39–37 Bell, 40–36 Bell, 40–36 Bell)

MF & DAZN: X Series 006 was a professional boxing event which featured JMX vs. Le'Veon Bell, a bridgerweight match contested between English YouTuber JMX and former football running back player Le'Veon Bell. The event took place on 21 April 2023 at the XULA Convocation Centre in New Orleans, Louisiana, US. Bell defeated JMX vis unanimous decision.

=== Background ===
During the broadcast for MF & DAZN: X Series 005, it was announced that JMX would face Bell on 21 April in New Orleans, Louisiana. Originally, it was announced that X Series 006 would take place on 22 April but was moved forward a day as that date clashes with Gervonta Davis vs. Ryan Garcia.

=== Card ===
Weight class		vs		Method	Round	Time	Notes
Postliminary Card
Super featherweight	Jeremy Hill	def.	Estivan Falcao	UD	8
Super middleweight	Sean Hemphill	def.	Abel Nicolas Adriel	TKO	4/6	2:32
Main Card
Bridgerweight	Le'Veon Bell	def.	JMX	UD	4		^{Note 1}
Light heavyweight	Chris Avila	def.	Paul Bamba	UD	4
Lightweight	Walid Sharks	def.	Ayye Pap	KO	2/4	1:34	^{Note 2}
Lightweight	Uncle Pizza	def.	YuddyGangTV	SD	4		^{Note 3}
Heavyweight	Malcom Minikon	vs.	Jake the Viking	SD	4		^{Note 4}
Middleweight	OJ Rosé	def.	Kimbo Slice Jr.	TKO	2/4	2:00	^{Note 5}
Preliminary Card
Heavyweight	Stevie Knight	def.	Chase DeMoor	DQ	1/4	2:59	^{Note 6}
Cruiserweight	Alaena Vampira	def.	Fangs	TKO	2/4	1:24	^{Note 7}

^JMX's professional debut
^Note 2 Pap's professional debut
^Note 3 Pizza and YuddyGangTV's professional debut
^Note 4 Jake's professional debut
^Note 5 Slice and Rosé’s professional debut
^Note 6 Knight's professional debut
^Note 7 Fangs and Vampira's professional debut

== MF & DAZN: X Series 007 ==
MF & DAZN: X Series 007 was an MF–professional boxing event which featured KSI vs Joe Fournier, a cruiserweight match contested between English internet personality KSI and professional boxer Joe Fournier for the MFB cruiserweight title. The event took place on 13 May 2023 at Wembley Arean in London. KSI defeated Fournier via knockout in the second round but was later overturned to a no contest after review shows KSI accidentally strikes Fournier with his elbow. The event reportedly sold 300,000 pay-per-view buys.

== MF & DAZN: X Series 008 ==
MF & DAZN: X Series 008
- Date: 22 July 2023
- Venue: Nashville Municipal Auditorium, Nashville, Tennessee, US

Tale of the tape
Boxer	NichLmao	Swarmz
Nickname		The Madman
Hometown	Singapore	London, England
Pre-fight record	0–1 (Note: On BoxRec, NichLmao's professional record is 0–0 and his MF-professional record is 0–1.)	1–2 (1 KO) (Note: On BoxRec, Swarmz's professional record is 0–0 and his MF-professional record is 1–2 (1 KO).)
Height	5 ft 11 in (1.80 m)	5 ft 8 in (1.73 m)
Weight	166 lb (75 kg)	166 lb (75 kg)
Style	Orthodox	Orthodox

Tale of the tape
Boxer	BDave	Ryan Johnston
Nickname	The Crab Daddy	
Hometown	Santa Monica, California, US	Montreal, Quebec, Canada
Pre-fight record	0–1 (Note: On BoxRec, BDave's professional record is 0–0 and his MF-professional record is 0–1.)	0–0
Height	5 ft 9 in (1.75 m)	5 ft 10 in (1.79 m)
Weight	166 lb (75 kg)	155 lb (70 kg)
Style	Orthodox	Orthodox

Result
- NichLmao defeated Swarmz, BDave and Johnson via Points Decision. (117 points)

MF & DAZN: X Series 008 was a professional boxing event which featured NichLmao vs. Swarmz vs. BDave vs. Ryan Johnston, a survivor tag crossover boxing match contested between Singaporean YouTuber NichLmao, English rapper Swarmz, American YouTuber BDave and Canadian YouTuber Ryan Johnston. The event took place on 22 July 2023 at the Nashville Municipal Auditorium in Nashville, Tennessee, US. NichLmao won via points decision.

=== Background ===
On 15 June, it was announced that NichLmao, Swarmz, BDave and Johnston would face each other in a survivor tag bout on 22 July at the Nashville Municipal Auditorium in Nashville, Tennessee, US. Originally, it was announced that MF & DAZN: X Series 008 would take place on 12 June but was delayed for an unknown reason.

The event will introduce 'survivor tag boxing' to the sport of boxing. The four fighters whom consist of NichLmao, Swarmz, BDave and Ryan Johnston, will be placed within each corner and once tagged in, must participate in the bout. The rules state that a boxer can tag-in any of the boxers that are currently stationed at their respected corner but cannot however, tag the boxer who had previously tagged out. If a boxer refuses to tag-in, they will be immediately eliminated. If a boxer were to be knocked out or knocked down, then they too will be eliminated. The last boxer standing will be crowned the winner.

==== Stein–MoDeen controversy ====
On 20 July, American right-wing YouTuber Alex Stein sparked controversy after throwing hotdogs at his opponent Iraqi TikToker MoDeen who is Muslim at the press conference and yelled "you love pork, right?". Stein was removed from the card and later claimed that the hotdogs were in fact turkey and not pork.

=== Card ===
Weight class		vs				Method	Round	Time	Notes
Postliminary Card
Super lightweight	Abdel Sauceda	def.	Tyler Tomlin	—N/a		KO	6/8	2:36
Lightweight	Austin Dulay	def.	Juan Carlos Pena	—N/a		KO	3/8	0:58
Main Card
Catchweight	NichLmao	def.	Swarmz	BDave	Ryan Johnston	PTS	4
Lightweight	Deen the Great & Walid Sharks	def.	YPG! (YuddyGangTV & Ayye Pap)	—N/a		UD	4		^{Note 2}
Heavyweight	Alan Belcher	def.	Chase DeMoor	—N/a		TKO	3/3	2:15	^{Note 3}
Bridgerweight	The AK Guy	def.	James Sellers	—N/a		TKO	3/4	2:14	^{Note 4}
Happy Punch Preliminary card
Welterweight	Corn	def.	Unbaer	—N/a		TKO	4	1:48	^{Note 5}
Catchweight	Jack Grady	def.	The Magic Crasher	—N/a		KO	2/4	2:00	^{Note 6}

^Note 1 Survivor Tag bout
^Note 2 Tag team bout
^Note 3 Exhibition bout
^Note 4 The AK Guy and Seller's professional debut
^Note 5 Unbaer and Corn's professional debut
^Note 6 Exhibition bout

== MF & DAZN: X Series 009 ==
MF & DAZN: X Series 009
- Date: 23 September 2023
- Venue: Vertu Motors Arena, Newcastle upon Tyne, England

Tale of the tape
Boxer	Idris Virgo	Aaron Chalmers
Nickname	The Bodybreaker	The Joker
Hometown	Birmingham, England	Newcastle upon Tyne, England
Pre-fight record	13–0–1 (2 KOs) (Note: On BoxRec, Virgo's professional record is 12–0–1 (2 KOs) and his MF-professional record is 1–0.)	1–0-1 (Boxing); 5–2 (2 KOs) (MMA)
Height	5 ft 11 in (1.80 m)	5 ft 11 in (1.80 m)
Weight	174.1 lb (79 kg)	174.8 lb (79 kg)
Style	Orthodox	Orthodox

Result
- Virgo defeated Chalmers via round 3 TKO.

MF & DAZN: X Series 009 was an MF–professional boxing event which featured Idris Virgo vs Aaron Chalmers, a light heavyweight match contested between professional boxer Idris Virgo and English reality television personality Aaron Chalmers. The event took place on 23 September 2023 at the Vertu Motors Arena in Newcastle upon Tyne. Virgo defeated Chalmers via technical knockout in the third round.

=== Background ===
On 30 August, it was announced that MF & DAZN: X Series 009 would headline Virgo vs Chalmers on 23 September at the Vertu Motors Arena in Newcastle upon Tyne, England. X Series 009 was originally scheduled to take place on 22 July in Berlin, Germany but was delayed for an unknown reason. It was then pushed back to 14 October during the broadcast of X Series 008. It was the brought forward after X Series – The Prime Card was announced for that date.

=== Card ===
Weight class		vs		Method	Round	Time	Notes
Main Card
Light heavyweight	Idris Virgo	def.	Aaron Chalmers	TKO	3/5	1:48
Cruiserweight	FaZe Temperrr	def.	Ginty	TKO	1/4	2:55
Light heavyweight	Ashley Rak-Su	def.	Halal Ham	UD	3
Light heavyweight	Gabriel Silva	def.	Ben Davis	KO	1/4	2:55
Heavyweight	Armz Korleone	def.	Master Oogway	TKO	1/3	2:45	^{Note 1}
Light heavyweight	OJ Rosé	def.	Callum Izzard	TKO	3/4	2:14
Preliminary Card
Middleweight	AJ Bunker	def.	Little Bellsy	UD	4		^{Note 2}
Lightweight	Small Spartan Jay	def.	Pully Arif	SD	4
Middleweight	Carla Jade	def.	Tash Weekender	UD	3

^Note 1 Korleone's identity was revealed during the press conference and was marketed as a mystery opponent
^Note 2 For inaugural MFB women's middleweight title

== MF & DAZN: X Series 10 – The Prime Card ==
MF & DAZN: X Series 10 – The Prime Card, billed as Judgement Day, was an MF–professional boxing event which featured a double main event. The first, KSI vs Tommy Fury, a cruiserweight professional boxing match contested between nglish internet personality KSI and English professional boxer Tommy Fury. The second, Logan Paul vs Dillon Danis, a cruiserweight match contested between American YouTuber and WWE wrestler Logan Paul and American mixed martial artist Dillon Danis.

The event took place on 14 October 2023 at Manchester Arena in Manchester. Fury defeated KSI via unanimous decision and Paul defeated Danis via disqualification in the sixth round. The event reportedly sold 1,300,000 pay-per-view buys.

== MF & DAZN: X Series 11 ==
MF & DAZN: X Series 11
- Date: 17 November 2023
- Venue: York Hall, London, England
- Title on the line: inaugural MFB welterweight championship

Tale of the tape
Boxer	Jarvis Khattri	BDave
Nickname		The Crab Daddy
Hometown	London, England	Santa Monica, California, US
Pre-fight record	0–0	0–1
Height	5 ft 8 in (173 cm)	5 ft 9 in (175 cm)
Weight	154.5 lb (70 kg)	154.6 lb (70 kg)
Style	Orthodox	Orthodox

Result
- Khattri defeated BDave via Unanimous Decision. (50–44 Khattri, 50–44 Khattri, 50–44 Khattri)

MF & DAZN: X Series 11 was an MF–professional boxing event which featured Jarvis vs BDave, a welterweight match contested between English YouTuber Jarvis Khattri and American YouTuber BDave. The event took place on 17 November 2023 at the York Hall in London. Khattri defeated BDave via unanimous decision.

=== Background ===
Prior to the start of the broadcast for MF & DAZN: X Series 10 – The Prime Card, DAZN announced on Twitter that X Series 11 will take place on 17 November at the York Hall in London and English YouTuber Jarvis Khattri and an unknown opponent will headline the card. The opponent was later announced to be American YouTuber BDave.

On 22 August 2024, it was announced by the PBA that Armz Korleone had received a four year suspension after he was revealed to have "a significantly elevated levels of testoerone" after taking a drug test. Therefore, Korelone's victory over Malcom Minikon was overturned and the bout was ruled as a no contest.

=== Card ===
Weight class		vs		Method	Round	Time	Notes
Main Card
Welterweight	Jarvis Khattri	def.	BDave	UD	5		^{Note 1}
Cruiserweight	Jully Poca	def.	Alaena Vampira	UD	5		^{Note 2}
Middleweight	Gabriel Silva	def	OJ Rosé	MD	4
Heavyweight	Armz Korleone	vs.	Malcom Minikon	NC	4
Lightweight	YuddyGangTV	def.	Uncle Pizza	SD	4
Preliminary Card
Cruiserweight	Dapper Laughs	def.	Simple Simon	TKO	1/4	1:05
Light heavyweight	Adam Brooks	def.	Rhino	KO	2/3	1:40
Bridgerweight	Muhsin Cason	def.	Piotr Budziszewski	KO	2/4	3:09

^Note 1 For inaugural MFB welterweight title
^Note 2 For inaugural MFB women's cruiserweight title

== See also ==
- 2022 in Misfits Boxing
- 2024 in Misfits Boxing
- 2025 in Misfits Boxing
- 2026 in Misfits Boxing
