= Swindler (surname) =

Swindler is a surname. Notable people with the name include:

- Daris Swindler (1925–2007), American anthropologist
- John Edward Swindler (1944–1990), American murderer
- Mary Hamilton Swindler (1884–1967), American archaeologist, author, and professor

== See also ==
- Swindle (surname)
