= List of Misfits Boxing champions =

English crossover boxing promotion company victors

This is a list of Misfits Boxing champions, showing every champion recognized by Misfits Boxing and MF Pro since 2022.

== Background ==
Since its inception, Misfits have awarded various fighters with the "MFB" world title. The first iteration was awarded to KSI for defeating Luis Alcaraz Pineda to become the inaugural cruiserweight champion. In December 2022, Misfits announced that the ICB (Influencer Championship Belt) will no longer be sanctioning title bouts, opting to use their promotion's belts exclusively.

In 2024, Misfits heled multiple tournaments to award their titles. One was for the interim lightweight title, as the champion at the time was injured, one for the cruiserweight title after KSI vacated the belt in January 2024, and one hosted by Stake featuring four professional fighters all taking place within the same night for the first "MF Pro" title. In an interview with Fred Talks Fighting on 25 September 2026, Mams Taylor confirmed that the MFB cruiserweight title tournament would not be continuing.

== Current champions ==
=== MFB ===
Division	Champion	Since	Defenses
Men
Heavyweight	(United States) Chase DeMoor	28 November 2024	3
Bridgerweight	(United Kingdom) Darren Till	30 August 2025	0
Cruiserweight	Vacant		
Light heavyweight	(Australia) Matt Floyd	18 June 2026 (Note: Originally, Taylor vs Floyd ended in a no contest on 12 June after Taylor accused Floyd of using Tiger Balm. However, on 18 June Misfits announced that the decision was overturned to a disqualification victory for Floyd.)	0
Welterweight	Vacant		
Middleweight	(United States) Tony Ferguson	20 December 2025	1
Lightweight	(United States) FoxTheG	9 November 2025	1
Women
Cruiserweight	Vacant		
Super middleweight	(United Kingdom) Jade Jones	12 September 2026	0
Middleweight	(United States) Pearl Gonzalez	20 December 2025	1
Lightweight	(United Kingdom) Carla Jade	14 September 2024	4

=== MF Pro ===
Division	Champion	Since	Defenses
Light heavyweight	(United Kingdom) Ty Mitchell	16 May 2025	1
Super middleweight	(United Kingdom) Ty Mitchell	30 August 2025	0
Middleweight	(United States) Amir Anderson	20 December 2025	0
Welterweight	(United States) David Lopez	20 December 2025	0

=== MF MMA ===
Division	Champion	Since	Defenses
Light heavyweight	(United States) Dillon Danis	30 August 2025	0

== Heavyweight ==
No.	Name	Event	Date	Reign (total)	Defenses		Ref.
1	(United Kingdom) Tempo Arts def. Chase DeMoor via SD	MF & DAZN: X Series 10 – The Prime Card; Manchester, England	14 October 2023	385 days	1	Defeated Ben Knights via TKO (5/5) (at MF & DAZN: X Series 14)	
Arts vacated his belt on 2 November 2024 after announcing his retirement from the sport of boxing.
2	(United States) Chase DeMoor def. Kelz via UD	MF & DAZN: X Series 19 – Qatar: The Supercard; Doha, Qatar	28 November 2024	718 days (incumbent)	1	Defeated Tank Tolman via TKO (3/5) (at Misfits 21 – Blinders & Brawls)	
2	(United States) Chase DeMoor def. Kelz via UD	MF & DAZN: X Series 19 – Qatar: The Supercard; Doha, Qatar	28 November 2024	718 days (incumbent)	2	Defeated Natan Marcoń via TKO (2/5) (at Misfits 22 – Ring of Thrones)	
2	(United States) Chase DeMoor def. Kelz via UD	MF & DAZN: X Series 19 – Qatar: The Supercard; Doha, Qatar	28 November 2024	718 days (incumbent)	3	Defeated Andrew Tate via MD (at Misfits Mania – The Fight Before Christmas)	
2	(United States) Chase DeMoor def. Kelz via UD	MF & DAZN: X Series 19 – Qatar: The Supercard; Doha, Qatar	28 November 2024	718 days (incumbent)	4	Defending against Andrei Arlovski (at DeMoor vs. Arlovski: New Blood)	

== Bridgerweight ==
No.	Name	Event	Date	Reign (total)	Defenses		Ref.
1	(United Kingdom) Darren Till def. Luke Rockhold via KO (3/6)	Misfits 22 – Ring of Thrones; Manchester, England	30 August 2025	443 days (incumbent)	1	TBD	—N/a

== Cruiserweight ==
=== Men's ===
No.	Name	Event	Date	Reign (total)	Defenses		Ref.
1	(United Kingdom) KSI def. Luis Alcaraz Pineda via TKO (3/3)	MF & DAZN: X Series 001; London, England	27 August 2022	520 days	1	Defeated FaZe Temperrr via KO (1/6) (at MF & DAZN: X Series 004)	
1	(United Kingdom) KSI def. Luis Alcaraz Pineda via TKO (3/3)	MF & DAZN: X Series 001; London, England	27 August 2022	520 days	2	No Contest against Joe Fournier (2/6) (at MF & DAZN: X Series 007)	
KSI vacated his belt on 29 January 2024 after stating he has other plans that aren't aligned with the championship title.

=== Women's ===
No.	Name	Event	Date	Reign (total)	Defenses		Ref.
1	(Brazil) Jully Poca def. Alaena Vampira via UD	MF & DAZN: X Series 11; London, England	17 November 2023	804 days	1	Defeated 6ar6ie6 via UD (at MF & DAZN: X Series 14)	
1	(Brazil) Jully Poca def. Alaena Vampira via UD	MF & DAZN: X Series 11; London, England	17 November 2023	804 days	2	Defeated Crystal Pittmans via UD (at MF & DAZN: X Series 18 – Stake Pro Tournament)	
1	(Brazil) Jully Poca def. Alaena Vampira via UD	MF & DAZN: X Series 11; London, England	17 November 2023	804 days	3	Defeated Monica Medina via MD (at MF Duel)	
Poca vacated her belt on 29 January 2026 after signing with Most Valuable Promotions to pursue professional boxing.

== Light heavyweight ==
No.	Name	Event	Date	Reign (total)	Defenses		Ref.
1	(United States) Slim Albaher def. Ryan Taylor via UD	MF & DAZN: X Series 002; Sheffield, England	15 October 2022	100 days	1	Defeated Tom Zanetti via UD (at MF & DAZN: X Series 004)	
Mams Taylor announced on 23 January 2023 that Albaher was vacating the belt to move down to his natural weight and pursue the middleweight title.
2	(United States) Anthony Taylor def. King Kenny via UD	MF & DAZN: X Series 10 – The Prime Card; Manchester, England	14 October 2023	978 days	1	Defeated Samuel Ericsson via TKO (2/5) (at MF & DAZN: X Series 16)	
2	(United States) Anthony Taylor def. King Kenny via UD	MF & DAZN: X Series 10 – The Prime Card; Manchester, England	14 October 2023	978 days	2	Defeated Gabriel Silva via TKO (3/5) (at MF & DAZN: X Series 17)	
2	(United States) Anthony Taylor def. King Kenny via UD	MF & DAZN: X Series 10 – The Prime Card; Manchester, England	14 October 2023	978 days	3	Lost to Matt Floyd (5/6) (at Misfits 23 – Beauty vs. The Beast)	
3	(Australia) Matt Floyd def. Anthony Taylor via TD	Misfits 23 – Beauty vs. The Beast; Manchester, England	18 June 2026	151 days (incumbent)	1	—N/a	—N/a

== Super middleweight ==
=== Women's ===
No.	Name	Event	Date	Reign (total)	Defenses		Ref.
1	(United Kingdom) Jade Jones def. Sheena Bathory via RTD (4/5)	McCann vs. Stacks; Newcastle upon Tyne, England	12 September 2026	65 days (incumbent)	1	TBD	—N/a

== Middleweight ==
=== Men's ===
No.	Name	Event	Date	Reign (total)	Defenses		Ref.
1	(United States) Slim Albaher def. Salt Papi via TKO (4/5)	MF & DAZN: X Series 10 – The Prime Card; Manchester, England	14 October 2023	411 days	1	Lost to AnEsonGib via UD (at MF & DAZN: X Series 19 – Qatar: The Supercard)	
2	(United Kingdom) AnEsonGib def. Slim Albaher via UD	MF & DAZN: X Series 19 – Qatar: The Supercard; Doha, Qatar	28 November 2024	348 days	—N/a		
Interim	(United States) Tony Ferguson def. Salt Papi via TKO (3/5)	Misfits 22 – Ring of Thrones; Manchester, England	30 August 2025	113 days	—N/a		
Mams Taylor announced on 11 November 2025 that Gib had vacated his belt.
3	(United States) Tony Ferguson def. Warren Spencer via UD	Misfits Mania – The Fight Before Christmas; Dubai, UAE	20 December 2025	331 days (incumbent)	1	Defeated Mahmoud Sebie via TKO (2/6) (at Cejudo vs. Walton)	

=== Women's ===
No.	Name	Event	Date	Reign (total)	Defenses		Ref.
1	(Philippines) AJ Bunker def. Little Bellsy via UD	MF & DAZN: X Series 009; Newcastle upon Tyne, England	23 September 2023	118 days	1	Lost to Elle Brooke via KO (3/5) (at MF & DAZN: X Series 12)	
2	(United Kingdom) Elle Brooke def. AJ Bunker via KO (3/5)	MF & DAZN: X Series 12; Leeds, England	19 January 2024	569 days	1	Drew against Paige VanZant via SD (at MF & DAZN: X Series 14)	
2	(United Kingdom) Elle Brooke def. AJ Bunker via KO (3/5)	MF & DAZN: X Series 12; Leeds, England	19 January 2024	569 days	2	Defeated Jenny Savage via UD (at MF & DAZN: X Series 18 – Stake Pro Tournament)	
3	(United States) Pearl Gonzalez def. Tai Emery via UD	Misfits Mania – The Fight Before Christmas; Dubai, UAE	20 December 2025	331 days (incumbent)	1	Defeated Carla Jade via UD (at MF Duel 2)	

== Welterweight ==
No.	Name	Event	Date	Reign (total)	Defenses		Ref.
1	(United Kingdom) Jarvis Khattri def. BDave via UD	MF & DAZN: X Series 11; London, England	17 November 2023	736 days	1	Defeated Ben Williams (at MF & DAZN: X Series 19 – Qatar: The Supercard)	
Mams Taylor announced on 11 November 2025 that Khartti had vacated his belt.

== Lightweight ==
=== Men's ===
No.	Name	Event	Date	Reign (total)	Defenses		Ref.
1	(United States) Deen the Great def. Walid Sharks via TKO (3/4)	MF & DAZN: X Series 003; Austin, Texas, US	19 November 2022	755 days	1	Defeated Pully Arif via UD (at MF & DAZN: X Series 005)	
1	(United States) Deen the Great def. Walid Sharks via TKO (3/4)	MF & DAZN: X Series 003; Austin, Texas, US	19 November 2022	755 days	2	Defeated Walid Sharks via UD (at MF & DAZN: X Series 10 – The Prime Card)	
1	(United States) Deen the Great def. Walid Sharks via TKO (3/4)	MF & DAZN: X Series 003; Austin, Texas, US	19 November 2022	755 days	3	Defeated Dave Fogarty via TKO (3/5) (at MF & DAZN: X Series 17)	
Interim	(Philippines) Lil Cracra def. YuddyGangTV via UD	MF & DAZN: X Series 19 – Qatar: The Supercard; Doha, Qatar	28 November 2024	15 days	—N/a		
Deen the Great was stripped from his belt on 13 December 2024 after failed negotiations for a bout with his mandatory defend Lil Cracra.
2	(Philippines) Lil Cracra; Promoted to champion	Deen the Great stripped	13 December 2024	331 days	1	Lost to FoxTheG via UD (at MF Duel)	
3	(United States) FoxTheG def. Lil Cracra via UD	MF Duel; Nashville, Tennessee, US	9 November 2025	372 days (incumbent)	1	Defeated Justin Ibarrola via UD (at Cejudo vs. Walton)	
3	(United States) FoxTheG def. Lil Cracra via UD	MF Duel; Nashville, Tennessee, US	9 November 2025	372 days (incumbent)	2	Defending agisnt Felony Charles (at DeMoor vs. Arlovski: New Blood)	

=== Women's ===
No.	Name	Event	Date	Reign (total)	Defenses		Ref.
1	(United Kingdom) Astrid Wett def. AJ Bunker via MD	MF & DAZN: X Series 005; Telford, England	5 March 2023	321 days	1	Defeated Alexia Grace via SD (at MF & DAZN: X Series 10 – The Prime Card)	
2	(United States) Nikki Hru def. Alexia Grace via UD	MF & DAZN: X Series 13; Nashville, Tennessee, US	23 March 2024	174 days	1	Lost to Carla Jade via UD (at MF & DAZN: X Series 18 – Stake Pro Tournament)	
3	(United Kingdom) Carla Jade def. Nikki Hru via UD	MF & DAZN: X Series 18 – Stake Pro Tournament; Newcastle upon Tyne, England	14 September 2024	793 days (incumbent)	1	Drew against Melanie Shah (at MF & DAZN: X Series 20)	
3	(United Kingdom) Carla Jade def. Nikki Hru via UD	MF & DAZN: X Series 18 – Stake Pro Tournament; Newcastle upon Tyne, England	14 September 2024	793 days (incumbent)	2	Defeated Daryn Harris via UD (at Misfits 22 – Ring of Thrones)	
3	(United Kingdom) Carla Jade def. Nikki Hru via UD	MF & DAZN: X Series 18 – Stake Pro Tournament; Newcastle upon Tyne, England	14 September 2024	793 days (incumbent)	3	Defeated Taylor Starling via UD (at Misfits Mania – The Fight Before Christmas)	
3	(United Kingdom) Carla Jade def. Nikki Hru via UD	MF & DAZN: X Series 18 – Stake Pro Tournament; Newcastle upon Tyne, England	14 September 2024	793 days (incumbent)	4	Defeated Erika Night via UD (at Essex vs. Dapper)	

== MF Pro light heavyweight ==
No.	Name	Event	Date	Reign (total)	Defenses		Ref.
1	(United Kingdom) Idris Virgo def. Benson Henderson via UD	MF & DAZN: X Series 18 – Stake Pro Tournament; Newcastle upon Tyne, England	14 September 2024	244 days	1	Lost to Ty Mitchell via TKO (3/8) (at Misfits 21 – Blinders & Brawls)	
2	(United Kingdom) Ty Mitchell def. Idris Virgo via TKO (3/8)	Misfits 21 – Blinders & Brawls; Derby, England	16 May 2025	549 days (incumbent)	1	Defeated Gabriel Rosado via UD (at MF Duel 2)	

== MF Pro super middleweight ==
No.	Name	Event	Date	Reign (total)	Defenses		Ref.
1	(United Kingdom) Ty Mitchell def. Sean Hemphill via SD	Misfits 22 – Ring of Thrones; Manchester, England	30 August 2025	443 days (incumbent)	1	TBD	—N/a

== MF Pro middleweight ==
No.	Name	Event	Date	Reign (total)	Defenses		Ref.
1	(United States) Amir Anderson def. Joe Laws via TKO (2/8)	Misfits Mania – The Fight Before Christmas; Dubai, UAE	20 December 2025	331 days (incumbent)	1	TBD	—N/a

== MF Pro welterweight ==
No.	Name	Event	Date	Reign (total)	Defenses		Ref.
1	(United States) David Lopez def. Luis Garcia via TKO (2/8)	Misfits Mania – The Fight Before Christmas; Dubai, UAE	20 December 2025	331 days (incumbent)	1	TBD	—N/a

== MF MMA light heavyweight ==
No.	Name	Event	Date	Reign (total)	Defenses		Ref.
1	(United States) Dillon Danis def. Warren Spencer via SUB (guillotine choke)	Misfits 22 – Ring of Thrones; Manchester, England	30 August 2025	443 days (incumbent)	1	TBD	—N/a

== See also ==
- List of Zuffa Boxing world champions
