= Chase DeMoor =

European-American boxer and former reality star (born 1996)

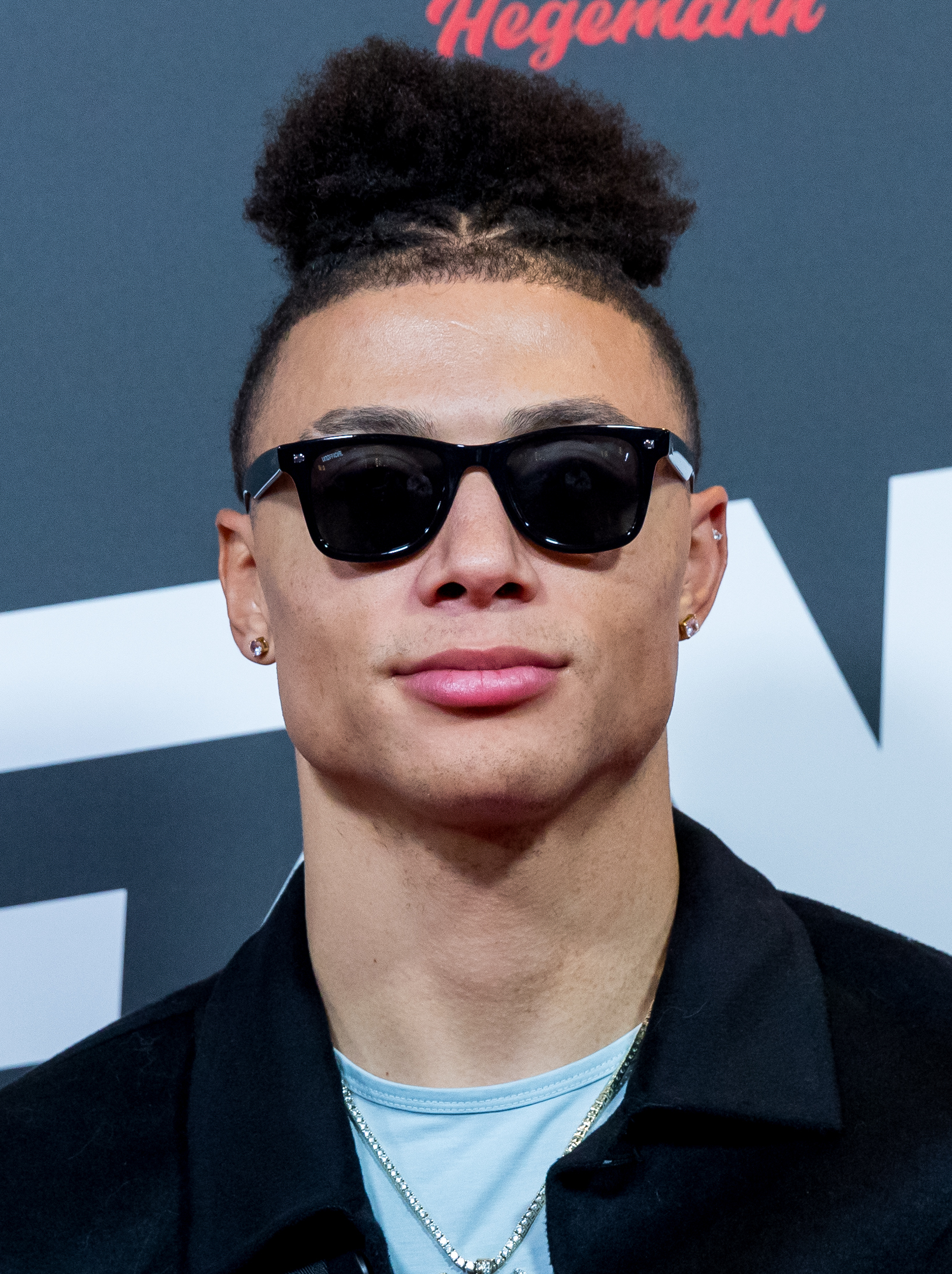
- DeMoor in 2024

Personal information
- Born: Chase DeMoor; June 12, 1996 (age 30) Eatonville, Washington, U.S.
- Occupations: Television personality; crossover boxer
- Years active: 2021–present
- Height: 6 ft 5 in (196 cm)
- Weight: Heavyweight

Boxing career
- Reach: 84 in (213 cm)
- Stance: Orthodox

Boxing record
- Total fights: 21 (Note: On BoxRec, DeMoor's professional record is 8–2–1 (8 KOs) and his MF–professional record is 5–1 (2 KOs).)
- Wins: 17
- Win by KO: 14
- Losses: 3
- Draws: 1

Chase Douglas DeMoor (born June 12, 1996) is an American professional boxer, actor, reality television personality, and former football player. He currently holds the MFB and WBC US Silver heavyweight championships. He is also known for his role in Too Hot to Handle.

== Early life ==
His father died when he was ten years old, after which he was raised by his mother, Jennifer DeMoor Torrence.

== Football career ==
After playing high school football, DeMoor began his college career at the College of the Siskiyous where over two seasons he recorded 5.5 sacks and 12 solo tackles.

DeMoor later transferred to Central Washington University (CWU) for his senior season, playing as a defensive lineman. While at CWU, DeMoor led the NCAA in blocked kicks in 2018 (six blocked kicks). DeMoor was named Hero Sports' Division II Special Teams Player of the Year.

After college, DeMoor attempted to join the Seattle Seahawks but did not make the roster. In 2020, DeMoor signed with the Montreal Alouettes of the Canadian Football League, though he did not appear in any regular-season games before being released.

In March 2021, DeMoor signed with the Arizona Rattlers of the Indoor Football League as a defensive lineman. Later that year, DeMoor joined the Houston Lineman in The Spring League.

In 2022, DeMoor played for the Michigan Panthers in the United States Football League.

== Television career ==
In 2021, DeMoor got cast in a reality program: Too Hot To Handle. On the show, contestants initially believe they are participating in a conventional dating reality series. However, after meeting one another and discovering the attraction between them, they are told that physical intimacy, including kissing, will cost them part of the prize money. Chase failed to win the competition because of his overly flirtatious behavior and perceived lack of personal development.

He later appeared in similar programs such as ‘‘All Star Shore’’, ‘‘Celebrity Ex on the Beach’’, and ‘‘House of Heat’’.

In 2025, DeMoor was cast in his first feature-length film, titled The Weeping, directed by Spyder Dobrofsky.

== Boxing career ==
=== DeMoor vs. Wharton ===
On July 3, 2022, it was announced that DeMoor and Cory Wharton would partake in an exhibition boxing bout scheduled for July 30 at the Crypto.com Arena in Los Angeles, California. The bout was part of the undercard to the influencer bout between YouTubers Austin McBroom and AnEsonGib. Unfortunately, on July 22, the event was postponed to September due to the headliner Gib falling ill. The event was then rescheduled for September 10 and moved to the Banc of California Stadium. On the night, the fight went the distance, and no winner was declared.

=== DeMoor vs. Brueckner ===
In October 2022, DeMoor announced his professional debut against American YouTuber Josh Brueckner. The bout was the co feature to MF & DAZN: X Series 003, which took place on November 19 at the Moody Center in Austin, Texas. On the night, Brueckner defeated DeMoor via corner retirement after the second round. DeMoor was mocked for his lack of boxing ability during this bout and later revealed he had considered suicide due to the backlash.

=== DeMoor vs. Knight ===
DeMoor returned to the ring five months later to face American YouTuber Stevie Knight on the MF & DAZN: X Series 006 undercard. The bout took place on April 21, 2023, at the XULA Convocation Centre in New Orleans, Louisiana. DeMoor was disqualified after hitting Knight while he was unconscious. DeMoor claimed he received a ban of twenty-four months (two years) and a fine of $100,000 following the match on Twitter.

Following his disqualification, DeMoor subsequently returned to the ring on July 22 to fight bare-knuckle boxer Alan Belcher on the MF & DAZN: X Series 008 undercard and in an exhibition. Originally, Belcher was scheduled to face professional boxer Hasim Rahman Jr., but was cancelled following Rahman Jr.'s withdrawal. DeMoor was brought in twenty-four hours before after Belcher's second opponent, Detrailous Webster, also withdrew. On the night, Belcher defeated DeMoor via third-round technical knockout.

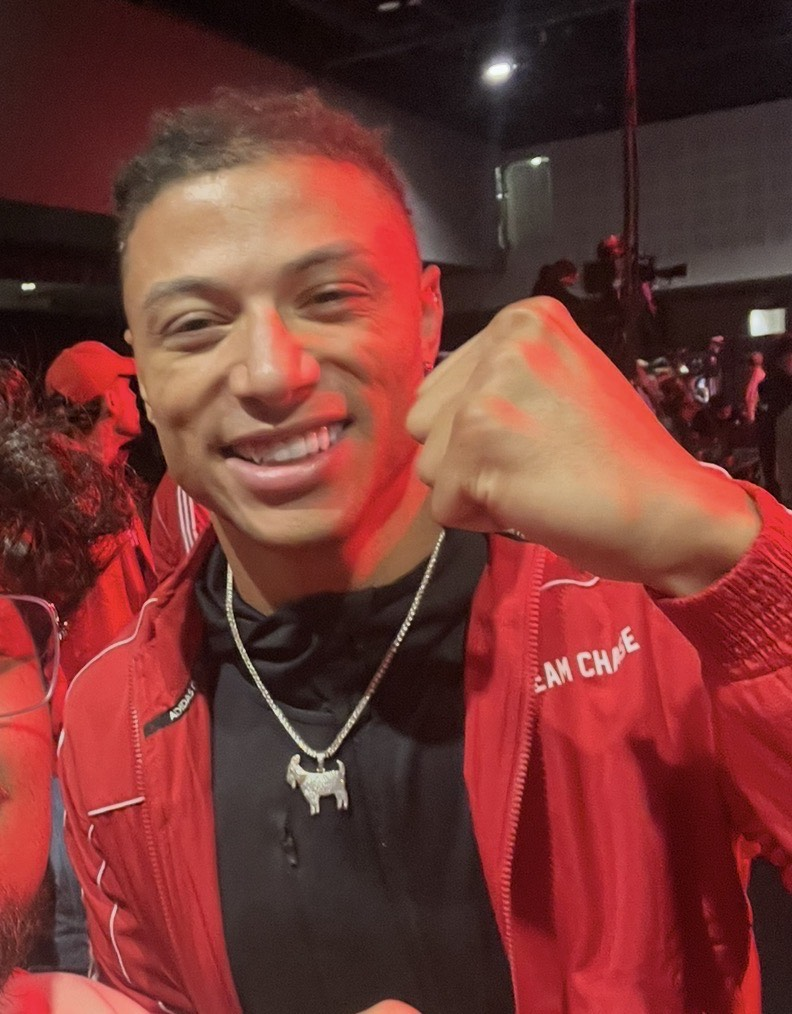
DeMoor in 2023

=== DeMoor vs. Arts ===
In September, Misfits Boxing announced that DeMoor would face English graphic designer Tempo Arts for the inaugural MFB heavyweight championship. The bout was a part of the super event MF & DAZN: X Series 10 – The Prime Card which took place on October 14 at Manchester Arena in Manchester, England and saw Arts defeating DeMoor via split decision.

A few months later on January 20, 2024, DeMoor returned to the ring and earned his first victory against American TikToker Malcom Minikon via unanimous decision on the MF & DAZN: X Series 12 undercard at the First Direct Arena in Leeds, England.

=== MFB heavyweight championship ===
==== Cancelled bout with Roman Fury ====
On February 13, 2025, it was announced that DeMoor would defend his title against English professional boxer Roman Fury, the half brother of Tyson Fury. The bout was scheduled to take place on March 29 at Manchester Arena in Manchester, England on the Misfits 21 – Unfinished Business undercard. However, on March 21 the event was postponed after the headline fighter KSI fell ill. On April 17, Misfits Boxing confirmed that the event was cancelled, and that the bout between DeMoor and Fury would not be rescheduled for the next event.

==== DeMoor vs. Tolman ====
Instead of Fury, it was announced that DeMoor would defend his title against Canadian mixed martial artist Tank Tolman on the new Misfits 21 – Blinders & Brawls undercard. The bout took place on May 16 at the Vaillant Live in Derby, England, with DeMoor defeating Tolman via technical knockout in the third round.

==== DeMoor vs. Marcoń ====
Four months later, DeMoor's second title defense was against Polish mixed martial artist Natan Marcoń on the Misfits 22 – Ring of Thrones undercard on August 30 at the Manchester Arena in Manchester, England. During the leadup to the bout, Marcoń hit DeMoor with an eggshell during their face off, which caused a brawl between the two. DeMoor defeated Marcoń via technical knockout in the second round, after Marcoń's bottom lip cut open.

==== DeMoor vs. Tate ====
In August 2025, reports stated that Andrew Tate was in advanced talks with Misfits Boxing to compete in a heavyweight bout by the end of the year. In October, Daily Mirror reported that DeMoor was set to be Tate's opponent for an unannounced bout for December 20 in Dubai, UAE. On 19 October, Misfits formally announced the event with a promotional video that featured a cobra wrapping around a Christmas tree, a subtle nod to Tate's fighting alias. On 30 October, the bout between DeMoor and Tate was announced to headline Misfits Mania – The Fight Before Christmas at the Dubai Duty Free Tennis Stadium. DeMoor defeated Tate via majority decision.

==== DeMoor vs. Petrović ====
On May 1, 2026, German influencer promotion Fame Fighting announced a joint event with Misfits Boxing with DeMoor headlining the event. The event was billed as a "promotion vs promotion", with DeMoor represented Misfits and his opponent, Aleks Petrović, represented Fame. The bout took place in Leverkusen, Germany at the Ostermann-Arena on June 6. DeMoor defeated Petrović via unanimous decision.

==== Cancelled bout with Plinio Cuz ====
On August 31, BoxRec accidentally leaked that DeMoor would face former mixed martial artist Plinio Cruz, current trainer for Alex Pereira, on the undercard of the Deen the Great vs. Henry Cejudo. However, on September 19, Misfits Boxing announced that the bout had been rescheduled and would now take place as the co-feature on the Joey Essex vs. Dapper Laughs card for October 10 at the Copper Box Arena in London. On October 5, the bout was ultimately cancelled due to DeMoor sustaining an injury leaving DeMoor's coach, Gary Olive, as the replacement opponent for Cruz.

==== DeMoor vs. Arlovski ====
DeMoor is scheduled to defend his title against former UFC Heavyweight Champion Andrei Arlovski on December 18, 2026 at MF: New Blood.

=== WBC US Silver championship ===
After having various bouts outside of the "crossover boxing" space, DeMoor announced that he would be fighting for the vacant WBC US Silver heavyweight championship. His opponent, Kevin Nagle (11–0), held the title in 2025 before it went vacant. The bout took place on August 29 at the Encore Boston Harbor in Everett, Massachusetts as DeMoor's third headliner. DeMoor defeated Nagle via technical knockout in the fifth round.

== Filmography ==
=== Film ===
Year	Title	Role	Notes	Ref
TBA	The Weeping †	Tristan	Post-production	

=== Television ===
Year	Title	Role	Notes	Ref
2021	Too Hot to Handle	Contestant	Season 2; finalist	
2022	Floor Is Lava	Himself	Episode: "Hotter than Lava"	
2023	Perfect Match	Contestant	Season 1; eliminated in Episode 5	
2023	All Star Shore	Contestant	Season 2; winner	
2024	House of Heat	Himself		
2025	Pop the Balloon Live	Contestant	Episode: "Get it Poppin'"	
2025	Battle Camp	Contestant		
2026	Celebrity Ex on the Beach	Contestant	Series 4	

=== Web ===
Year	Title	Role	Notes	Ref
2023–2025	XTRA Series	Himself	Recurring	

== Career statistics ==
Legend
	Led the league
**Bold**	Career high

=== Regular season ===
Year	Team	Games		Defense				Special teams	
Year	Team	GP	GS	Tackles	Sacks	FF	FR	Blocked kicks	Notes
2015–2016	COS	–	–	12	5.5	–	–	–	Two seasons (JUCO)
2018	CWU	–	–	4	2.0	1	–	6	Led NCAA D-II in blocked kicks; Hero Sports Special Teams Player of the Year
2020	ALS	0	0	Did not appear in regular season					
2021	Arizona Rattlers	–	–	–	–	–	–	–	Indoor Football League
2021	Houston Linemen	–	–	–	–	–	–	–	The Spring League
2022	Michigan Panthers	–	–	3 (ast)	1.5	–	–	–	USFL season

== Boxing record ==
=== MF–Professional ===
6 fights	5 wins	1 loss
By knockout	2	0
By decision	3	1

No.	Result	Record	Opponent	Type	Round, time	Date	Location	Notes
6	Win	5–1	Andrew Tate	MD	6	Dec 20, 2025	Dubai Duty Free Tennis Stadium, Dubai, U.A.E.	Retained MFB heavyweight title
5	Win	4–1	Natan Marcoń	TKO	2 (5), 0:52	Aug 30, 2025	Manchester Arena, Manchester, England	Retained MFB heavyweight title
4	Win	3–1	Tank Tolman	TKO	3 (5), 1:15	May 16, 2025	Vaillant Live, Derby, England	Retained MFB heavyweight title
3	Win	2–1	Kelz	UD	5	Nov 28, 2024	Lusail Sports Arena, Doha, Qatar	Won vacant MFB heavyweight title
2	Win	1–1	Malcolm Minikon	UD	4	Jan 20, 2024	First Direct Arena, Leeds, England	
1	Loss	0–1	Tempo Arts	SD	5	Oct 14, 2023	Manchester Arena, Manchester, England	For inaugural MFB heavyweight title

=== Professional ===
15 fights	12 wins	2 losses
By knockout	12	1
By disqualification	0	1
Draws	1	

No.	Result	Record	Opponent	Type	Round, time	Date	Location	Notes
15	Win	12–2–1	Kevin Nagle	TKO	5 (8)	Aug 29, 2026	Encore Boston Harbor, Everett, Massachusetts, U.S.	Won vacant WBC Silver US heavyweight title
14	Win	11–2–1	Jesus Alejandro Velazco Aguilar	TKO	5 (8)	July 17, 2026	Jalisco, Jamay, Mexico	
13	Win	10–2–1	Julio Mendoza Rodriguez	TKO	7 (8), 1:53	May 30, 2026	Gym Municipal, Jamay, Mexico	
12	Win	9–2–1	Jesus Enrique Aceves Rangel	TKO	5 (6)	May 3, 2026	Gym Municipal, Jamay, Mexico	
11	Win	8–2–1	Diego Jair Perez Vigil	TKO	6 (8), 2:33	Mar 21, 2026	Gym Municipal, Jamay, Mexico	
10	Win	7–2–1	Luis Alberto Velasco	TKO	6 (8), 0:45	Feb 21, 2026	Gym Municipal, Jamay, Mexico	Won vacant WBA Fedecaribe heavyweight title
9	Win	6–2–1	Fernando Miguel Tamayo Alvarez	TKO	4 (6), 0:08	Jan 24, 2026	Gym Municipal, Jamay, Mexico	
8	Win	5–2–1	Devinson Guerra	TKO	1 (4), 2:34	Oct 17, 2025	Coliseo de Monumental de Ciénega, Ciénega, Colombia	
7	Draw	4–2–1	Efrain Carranza Gonzalez	MD	4	Sep 6, 2025	Evolution Club, Tijuana, Mexico	
6	Win	4–2	Isaac Jesus Juarez Garcia	TKO	1 (4), 1:45	Jun 7, 2025	Evolution Club, Tijuana, Mexico	
5	Win	3–2	Israel Troles Acevedo	KO	2 (4), 0:45	Mar 15, 2025	Evolution Club, Tijuana, Mexico	
4	Win	2–2	Carlos Angel Valenzuela Gonzalez	RTD	2 (4), 3:00	Dec 7, 2024	Evolution Club, Tijuana, Mexico	
3	Win	1–2	Terrick Maven	TKO	1 (4), 1:32	Sep 7, 2024	Carteret Performing Arts Center, Carteret, New Jersey, U.S.	
2	Loss	0–2	Stevie Knight	DQ	1 (4), 0:44	Apr 21, 2023	XULA Convocation Centre, New Orleans, Louisiana, U.S.	DeMoor disqualified for hitting Knight while he was down
1	Loss	0–1	Josh Brueckner	RTD	2 (4), 3:00	Nov 19, 2022	Moody Center, Austin, Texas, U.S.	

=== Exhibition ===
3 fights	1 win	1 loss
By knockout	0	1
By decision	1	0
Non-scored	1	

No.	Result	Record	Opponent	Type	Round, time	Date	Location	Notes
3	Win	1–1 (1)	Aleks Petrović	UD	6	June 6, 2026	Ostermann-Arena, Leverkusen, Germany	
2	Loss	0–1 (1)	Alan Belcher	TKO	3 (3), 2:15	July 22, 2023	Nashville Municipal Auditorium, Nashville, Tennessee, U.S.	
1	—N/a	0–0 (1)	Cory Wharton	—N/a	5	Sep 10, 2022	Banc of California Stadium, Los Angeles, California, U.S.	
