= 2025 in Misfits Boxing =

Misfits Boxing
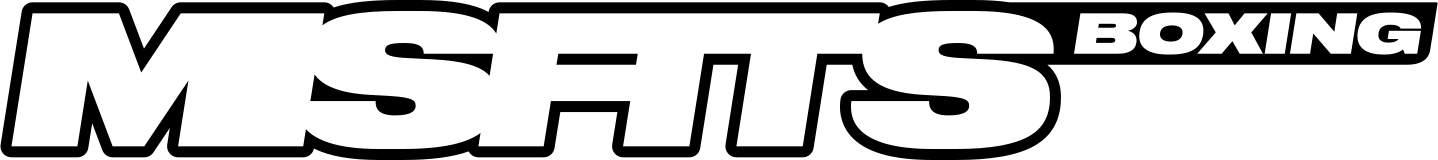

Information
- Promotion: Misfits Boxing
- First date: 18 January 2025
- Last date: 20 December 2025
- Website: misfitsboxing.com

Fights
- Total fights: 48
- Title fights: 16

2025 in Misfits Boxing is the fourth year in the history of Misfits Boxing, a crossover boxing promotion founded by English YouTuber KSI and run by Mams Taylor, Kalle Sauerland, and Nisse Sauerland. Misfits Boxing held 5 events in 2025.

== MF & DAZN: X Series 20 ==
MF & DAZN: X Series 20
- Date: 18 January 2025
- Venue: Co-op Live, Manchester, England

Tale of the tape
| Boxer | Darren Till | Anthony Taylor |
| Nickname | "The Gorilla" | "PrettyBoy" |
| Hometown | Liverpool, England | Berkeley, California, US |
| Pre-fight record | 0–0 (Boxing); 18–5–1 (10 KOs) (MMA) | 7–4 (3 KOs) (Boxing) (Note: On BoxRec, Taylor's professional record is 3–3 (2 KOs) and his MF-professional record is 4–1 (1 KO).); 7–5 (1 KO) (MMA) |
| Height | 6 ft 0 in (183 cm) | 5 ft 6 1/2 in (169 cm) |
| Weight | 195.1 lb (88 kg) | 192.5 lb (87 kg) |
| Style | Southpaw | Orthodox |
| Recognition | | MFB light heavyweight champion |

Result
- Till defeated Taylor via round 6 TKO.

MF & DAZN: X Series 20 was an MF–professional boxing event that featured Darren Till vs Anthony Taylor, a bridgerweight match contested between English mixed martial artist Darren Till and American mixed martial artist Anthony Taylor. The event took place on 18 January 2025 at the Co-op Live in Manchester. Till defeated Taylor via technical knockout in the sixth round.

Originally, Till was scheduled to face English professional boxer Tommy Fury, but the bout was cancelled after Fury withdrew on 6 December 2024.

=== Background ===
In July 2024, mixed martial artist Darren Till had an exhibition bout against Mohammad Mutie on Social Knockout 3 and proceeded to call out call out Mike Perry, Jake Paul, and Tommy Fury to a bout. On 25 October, it was reported that Fury withdrew weeks prior from filming "I'm a Celebrity...Get Me Out of Here!" in Australia after receiving an offer that was more lucrative, which was reported to be the KSI rematch from their bout on X Series 10 – The Prime Card. On 12 November, Fury revealed he was eyeing a return to the ring for either February or March 2025. On 17 November, Misfits Boxing announced that Fury would take on Till at the Co-op Live in Manchester on 18 January 2025.

The launch press conference was held on 19 November in London. After back and forth arguments between Fury, Till, and KSI, Fury's father John Fury, threw water at Till and nearly causing a brawl.

However, on 6 December, Fury announced that he had withdrawn from the bout due to Till at the press conference stating he would resort to "MMA tactics" if he was losing the fight. Till responded claiming that he would never break the rules of professional boxing, and that he only mentioned this resort as a mental tactic. Till confirmed that he would remain as the headliner for the bout, with an opponent to be announced shortly after. On 29 December, Till's new opponent was announced to be American mixed martial artist Anthony Taylor.

Originally, the co-feature bout was scheduled to be English influencer HSTikkyTokky vs American YouTuber and sports commentator Wade Plemons after the pair faced off at X Series 19 – Qatar: The Supercard. However, HSTikkyTokky withdrew due to an ongoing court case in which an arrest warrant by the Surrey Police was issued while the influencer was in Qatar, and was replaced by Kenyan reality television personality Masai Warrior (an opponent HSTikkyTokky was also originally scheduled to face on X Series 19).

=== Card ===
| Weight class | | vs | | Method | Round | Time | Notes |
Main Card
| Bridgerweight | Darren Till | def. | Anthony Taylor | TKO | 6/8 | 1:05 |
| Bridgerweight | Wade Plemons | def. | Masai Warrior | UD | 4 |
| Cruiserweight | Ty Mitchell | def. | Tommy Hench | KO | 3/6 | 1:35 |
| Lightweight | Carla Jade (c) | vs. | Melanie Shah | SD | 5 | | ^{Note 1} |
| Welterweight | Little T | def. | Afghan Dan | TKO | 2/3 | 1:14 |
| Welterweight | Sami Hamed | def. | Ziggy Johnson | TKO | 1/4 | 1:19 |
Misfits Kick-Offs
| Cruiserweight | Adam Brooks | def. | Gavinio | KO | 2/4 | 0:52 |
| Heavyweight | BBCC Gareth | def. | Kak Hatt | TKO | 1/4 | 1:33 |

^Note 1 For women's MFB lightweight title

== Misfits 21 – Unfinished Business (Cancelled event) ==
Misfits 21 – Unfinished Business was supposed to be an MF–professional boxing event that would've featured KSI vs Dillon Danis, a cruiserweight match contested between English internet personality KSI and American mixed martial artist Dillon Danis. The event was cancelled on 21 March after KSI fell ill and a rescheduled date could not be determined.

Originally, KSI was scheduled to face former footballer Wayne Bridge, but the bout was cancelled after Bridge withdrew on 20 January.

== Misfits 21 – Blinders & Brawls ==
Blinders & Brawls
- Date: 16 May 2025
- Venue: Vaillant Live, Derby, England

Tale of the tape
| Boxer | Darren Till | Darren Stewart |
| Nickname | "The Gorilla" | "The Dentist" |
| Hometown | Liverpool, England | Poplar, England |
| Pre-fight record | 1–0 (1 KO) (Note: On BoxRec, Till's professional record is 0–0 and his MF-professional record is 1–0 (1 KO).) (Boxing); 18–5–1 (10 KOs) (MMA) | 0–0 (Boxing); 16–10–2 (9 KOs) (MMA) |
| Weight | 199.8 lb (91 kg) | 199.7 lb (91 kg) |
| Style | Southpaw | Orthodox |

Result
- Till defeated Stewart via Unanimous Decision. (77–74 Till, 77–74 Till, 77–73 Till)

Misfits 21 – Blinders & Brawls was an MF–professional boxing event that featured Darren Till vs Darren Stewart, a cruiserweight match contested between English mixed martial artists Darren Till and Darren Stewart. The event took place on 16 May 2025 at the Vaillant Live in Derby. Till defeated Stewart via unanimous decision.

Originally, the event was scheduled to headline English professional boxers Idris Virgo and Ty Mitchel and take place on 12 April, but was postponed after the original Misfits 21, Unfinished Business, was cancelled following KSI withdrawing, and due to scheduling issues.

=== Background ===
On 4 March 2025, during the broadcast of the launch press conference for Misfits 21 – Unfinished Business, it was announced that Misfits 22 would take place on 12 April at the First Direct Arena in Leeds, England featuring the return of a tag team bout. On 11 March, Misfits Boxing announced the event with Idris Virgo vs Ty Mitchell as the headliner and the event was moved to the Becketwell Live in Derby. On 4 April, Misfits Boxing announced that Misfits 22 was postponed to 16 May, and became Misfits 21.

On 17 April, it was announced that English mixed martial artists Darren Till and Darren Stewart would have their bout moved from the cancelled Misfits 21 to this event, becoming the new headliner.

=== Card ===
| Weight class | | vs | | | | Method | Round | Time | Notes |
Main Card
| Cruiserweight | Darren Till | def. | Darren Stewart | —N/a | | UD | 8/8 |
| Light heavyweight | Ty Mitchell | def. | Idris Virgo (c) | —N/a | | TKO | 3/8 | 2:58 | ^{Note 1}^{,} ^{2} |
| Heavyweight | Chase DeMoor (c) | def. | Tank Tolman | —N/a | | TKO | 3/5 | 1:15 | ^{Note 3} |
| Lightweight | FoxTheG | def. | Walid Sharks | —N/a | | UD | 4 |
| Heavyweight | Wakey Wines | def. | MoDeen | —N/a | | UD | 5 | | ^{Note 4}^{,} ^{5} |
| Heavyweight | Jordan Banjo | def. | Wil Anderson | —N/a | | TKO | 4/4 | 2:13 |
| Heavyweight | Tempo Art | def. | Curtis Pritchard | Godson Umeh | Big Tobz | PTS | 5 | | ^{Note 6} |
| Lightweight | Joey Knight | def. | Andy Howson | —N/a | | UD | 5 |
Misfits Kick-Offs
| Middleweight | Amir Anderson | def. | Ernesto Olvera | —N/a | | TKO | 3/6 | 1:30 | ^{Note 7} |
| Super bantamweight | Ckari Can Mansilla | def. | Dylan Price | —N/a | | KO | 8/10 | 2:42 | ^{Note 8} |

^Note 1 Professional bout
^Note 2 For MF pro light heavyweight title
^Note 3 For MFB heavyweight title
^Note 4 Exhibition bout
^Note 5 1 minute rounds
^Note 6 Survivor Tag bout
^Note 7 Professional bout
^Note 8 Professional bout

== Misfits 22 – Ring of Thrones ==
Ring of Thrones
- Date: 30 August 2025
- Venue: Manchester Arena, Manchester, England
- Title on the line: inaugural MFB bridgerweight title

Tale of the tape
| Boxer | Darren Till | Luke Rockhold |
| Nickname | "The Gorilla" | |
| Hometown | Liverpool, England | Santa Cruz, California, US |
| Pre-fight record | 2–0 (1 KO) (Note: On BoxRec, Till's professional record is 0–0 and his MF-professional record is 2–0 (1 KO).) (Boxing); 18–5–1 (10 KOs) (MMA) | 0–0 (Boxing); 16–6 (8 KOs) (MMA) |
| Style | Southpaw | Orthodox |
| Recognition | | Former UFC Middleweight Champion |

Result
- Till defeated Rockhold via round 3 KO.

- Title on the line: interim MFB middleweight title

Tale of the tape
| Boxer | Tony Ferguson | Salt Papi |
| Nickname | "El Cucuy" | "Super" |
| Hometown | Oxnard, California, US | Candelaria, Philippines |
| Pre-fight record | 0–0 (Boxing); 25–11 (13 KOs) (MMA) | 4–2 (4 KOs) (Note: On BoxRec, Papi's professional record is 0–0 and his MF-professional record is 4–2 (4 KOs).) |
| Style | Southpaw | Southpaw |
| Recognition | Former Interim UFC Lightweight Champion | |

Result
- Ferguson defeated Papi via round 3 TKO.

Misfits 22 – Ring of Thrones, was an MF–professional boxing event which featured a double main event. The first, Darren Till vs Luke Rockhold, a bridgerweight professional match contested between English mixed martial artists Darren Till and American former UFC middleweight championship Luke Rockhold for the inaugural MFB bridgerweight title. The second, Tony Ferguson vs Salt Papi, a middleweight professional match contested between American former mixed martial artist Tony Ferguson and Filipino crossover boxer Salt Papi for the interim MFB middleweight title.

The event took place on 30 August 2025 at Manchester Arena in Manchester. Till defeated Rockhold via knockout in the third round and Ferguson defeated Papi via technical knockout in the third round. The number of pay-per-view buys was not disclosed.

=== Background ===
After defeating Darren Stewart at Misfits 21 – Blinders & Brawls in May, former mixed martial artist Darren Till proceeded to call out Mike Perry, Jake Paul, and KSI to compete in a boxing bout. Since then, Till has been calling out numerous opponents on his X account, including Nate Diaz. On 13 June, Till confirmed that Diaz had withdrawn from a potential bout during negotiations. Till's manager Lee Eaton also stated that alongside Diaz, Perry, Carl Froch, and Tyron Woodley all declined a bout with Till. On 1 July, Misfits Boxing confirmed that their next event would take place on 30 August, with Till expected to return as the main event for a third time in a row. On 5 July, former interim UFC lightweight champion Tony Ferguson announced that he would be making his boxing debut on 30 August.

On 16 July, Misfits 22 – Ring of Thrones was officially announced with Till set to take on former UFC Middleweight Champion Luke Rockhold, serving as the first main event with Ferguson set to take on Filipino Misfits veteran Salt Papi as the second main event on 30 August at Manchester Arena in Manchester, England. On 20 July, Misfits announced Dillon Danis and Warren Spencer would take part in an MMA bout on the undercard.

=== Card ===
| Weight class | | vs | | Method | Round | Time | Notes |
Main Card (PPV)
| Bridgerweight | Darren Till | def. | Luke Rockhold | KO | 3/6 | 1:08 | ^{Note 1}^{,} ^{2} |
| Middleweight | Tony Ferguson | def. | Salt Papi | TKO | 3/5 | 2:43 | ^{Note 3}^{,} ^{4} |
| Light heavyweight | Dillon Danis | def. | Warren Spencer | SUB | 1/3 | 0:15 | ^{Note 5}^{,} ^{6} |
| Middleweight | Joey Essex | def. | Numeiro | MD | 4 |
| Super middleweight | Ty Mitchell | def. | Sean Hemphill | SD | 10 | | ^{Note 7}^{,} ^{8} |
| Heavyweight | Chase DeMoor (c) | def. | Natan Marcoń | TKO | 2/5 | 0:52 | ^{Note 9} |
| Light heavyweight | Rahim Pardesi | def. | Amadeusz Ferrari | KO | 4/4 | 1:05 |
| Middleweight | Amir Anderson | def. | Vitor Siqueira | TKO | 5/8 | 0:55 | ^{Note 10} |
Misfits Kick-Offs
| Lightweight | Carla Jade (c) | def. | Daryn Harris | UD | 5 | | ^{Note 11} |
| Cruiserweight | Demi Sims | def. | Nadeshi Hopkins | UD | 4 |
| Super lightweight | J'Hon Ingram | def. | Banty Singh | TKO | 2/6 | 1:19 | ^{Note 12} |

^Note 1 Professional bout; Till and Rockhold's professional debut
^Note 2 For inaugural MFB bridgerweight title
^Note 3 Professional bout; Ferguson and Papi's professional debut
^Note 4 For interim MFB middleweight title
^Note 5 Mixed martial arts bout
^Note 6 For inaugural MF MMA light heavyweight title
^Note 7 Professional bout
^Note 8 For inaugural MF pro super middleweight title
^Note 9 For MFB heavyweight title
^Note 10 For MFB women's lightweight title
^Note 11 Professional bout
^Note 12 Professional bout

=== Broadcast ===
The event will be broadcast on pay-per-view on DAZN worldwide.

| Country/Region | Broadcasters | | | |
| Country/Region | Free | Cable TV | PPV | Stream |
|---|---|---|---|---|
| United Kingdom | YouTube; Kick (Misfits Kick-Offs) | —N/a | DAZN PPV | |
| United States | YouTube; Kick (Misfits Kick-Offs) | —N/a | DAZN PPV | |
| Worldwide | YouTube; Kick (Misfits Kick-Offs) | —N/a | DAZN PPV | |

== MF Duel: Cracra vs Fox ==
MF Duel
- Date: 9 November 2025
- Venue: Nashville Municipal Auditorium, Nashville, Tennessee, US
- Title on the line: MFB lightweight title

Tale of the tape
| Boxer | Lil Cracra | FoxTheG |
| Nickname | | "The Big Daddy" |
| Hometown | Syracuse, New York, US | Slough, England |
| Pre-fight record | 3–1 (Note: On BoxRec, Cracra's professional record is 1–1 and his MF-professional record is 2–0.) | 2–0 (1 KO) (Note: On BoxRec, Fox's professional record is 0–0 and his MF-professional record is 2–0 (1 KO).) |
| Height | 5 ft 5 in (165 cm) | 5 ft 9 in (175 cm) |
| Style | Orthodox | Orthodox |
| Recognition | MFB lightweight champion | |

Result
- Fox defeated Cracra via Unanimous Decision. (58–56 Fox, 58–56 Fox, 58–56 Fox)

MF Duel: Cracra vs Fox was a MF–professional boxing event that featured Lil Cracra vs FoxTheG, a lightweight match contested between Filipino crossover boxer Lil Cracra and English YouTuber FoxTheG for the MFB lightweight title. The event took place on 9 November 2025 at the Nashville Municipal Auditorium in Nashville, Tennessee, US. Fox defeated Cracra via unanimous decision.

=== Background ===
On 28 October, Misfits Boxing announced the first MF Duel event scheduled to take place on 9 November, which features Lil Cracra and FoxTheG has the headliner and the debut of former UFC Heavyweight Champion Andrei Arlovski.

=== Card ===
| Weight class | | vs | | Method | Round | Time | Notes |
Postliminary Card
| Super lightweight | Austin Dulay | def. | Brandon Mendoza | UD | 6 |
Main Card
| Lightweight | FoxTheG | def. | Lil Cracra (c) | UD | 6 | | ^{Note 1} |
| Heavyweight | Andrei Arlovski | def. | Kelz | KO | 4/4 | 1:10 |
| Cruiserweight | Jully Poca (c) | def. | Monica Medina | MD | 5 | | ^{Note 2} |
| Super middleweight | Amir Anderson | def. | Dedrick Bell | KO | 1/8 | 2:56 | ^{Note 3} |
| Super lightweight | Ashton Sylve | def. | Daniel Lugo | TKO | 5/8 | 2:34 | ^{Note 4} |
| Light heavyweight | BDave | def. | Sean Stewart | KO | 1/3 | 0:15 |
| Lightweight | J'Hon Ingram | def. | Joseph Rivas | TKO | 3/8 | 2:05 | ^{Note 5} |
| Lightweight | Argentinian King | def. | Small Spartan Jay | UD | 4 |

^Note 1 For MFB lightweight title
^Note 2 For MFB women's cruiserweight title
^Note 3 Professional bout
^Note 4 Professional bout
^Note 5 Professional bout

== Misfits Mania – The Fight Before Christmas ==
Misfits Mania – The Fight Before Christmas was a MF–professional boxing event featuring Andrew Tate vs Chase DeMoor, a heavyweight match contested between American influencer Andrew Tate and American reality star Chase DeMoor for the MFB heavyweight title. The event took place on 20 December 2025 at the Dubai Duty Free Tennis Stadium in Dubai, UAE. DeMoor defeated Tate via majority decision.

== See also ==
- 2022 in Misfits Boxing
- 2023 in Misfits Boxing
- 2024 in Misfits Boxing
- 2026 in Misfits Boxing
