= Godson Umeh =

British-Nigerian entrepreneur

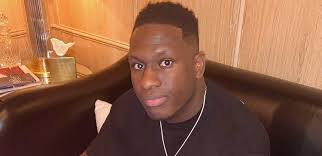
- Godson in 2020
- Born: 11 September 1995 (age 31); Reading, Berkshire, England
- Occupations: Jeweller, Entrepreneur
- Years active: 2014–present
- Known for: Custom Jewellery Design
- Website: godsonumeh.com

Godson Umeh (born 11 September 1995) is a British Nigerian jeweler and entrepreneur. He is known for designing jewelry for athletes and musicians.

== Early life and education ==
Godson was born in Reading, Berkshire, England, to Nigerian parents. He grew up in the United Kingdom and has described his upbringing as central to his identity as both British and Nigerian. During his teenage years, Godson pursued a short-lived football career, before being released at the age of 20. Following his football journey, he developed interest in fashion and luxury accessories, which eventually led him to explore jewelry design.

== Career ==
Godson began his professional jewelry design career at the age of 20, officially launching his brand, Godson in 2018. Creating custom pieces for private clients and public figures.

After establishing his early presence in the United Kingdom, Godson later moved to New York to expand his knowledge of diamond trading and fine jewelry design. His brand soon gained international recognition for its creations, attracting clients across music, sports, and entertainment.

Godson's clients included notable figures such as rap artist Meek Mill, American rapper Bay Swag, footballer Raheem Sterling, and the British rap duo Krept & Konan, Lil Mosey, Zlatan among others.

== Other ventures ==
=== Boxing ===
In March 2023, Umeh participated in a MF–professional boxing match on the MF & DAZN: X Series 005 undercard. The bout took place on 3 March at the Telford International Centre in Telford, England and his opponent was graphic designer Tempo Arts. To which Umeh lost via corner retirement after one round. For his entrance, he was walked out by the British rap duo Krept & Konan.

In February 2025, Misfits Boxing announced that Umeh would return to the ring in a Survivor Tag boxing bout on the Misfits 22 – Blinders & Brawls undercard. However, the event was postponed due to the cancelation of Misfits 21 – Unfinished Business. On 17 April, the bout was rescheduled for 16 May at the Vaillant Live in Derby, becoming the Misfits 21. On the night, Umeh was eliminated in the fourth round and Arts won points decision.

== Boxing record ==
=== MF–Professional ===
1 fight	0 wins	1 loss
By knockout	0	1

No.	Result	Record	Opponent	Type	Round, time	Date	Location	Notes
1	Loss	0–1	Tempo Arts	RTD	2 (3), 3:00	4 Mar 2023	Telford International Centre, Telford, England	

=== Survivor Tag ===
1 fight	0 wins	1 loss
By decision	0	1

No.	Result	Record	Opponents	Type	Round, time	Date	Location	Notes
1	Loss	0–1	Tempo Arts	PTS	5	16 May 2025	Vaillant Live, Derby, England	Arts won on points. Tobz was eliminated after the third round. Umeh was eliminated after the fourth round.
1	Loss	0–1	Big Tobz	PTS	5	16 May 2025	Vaillant Live, Derby, England	Arts won on points. Tobz was eliminated after the third round. Umeh was eliminated after the fourth round.
1	Loss	0–1	Curtis Pritchard	PTS	5	16 May 2025	Vaillant Live, Derby, England	Arts won on points. Tobz was eliminated after the third round. Umeh was eliminated after the fourth round.
