= Curtis Pritchard =

English dancer and choreographer (born 1996)

- Born: 8 February 1996 (age 30); Stoke-on-Trent, Staffordshire, England
- Occupations: Dancer; choreographer
- Years active: 2017–present
- Television: Dancing with the Stars; Love Island; The Greatest Dancer; Hollyoaks; Celebs Go Dating; Love Island Games; Love Island: All Stars; Celebrity Ex on the Beach
- Height: 1.85 m (6 ft 1 in)
- Relatives: AJ Pritchard (Brother)

Curtis Pritchard (born 8 February 1996) is an English dancer and choreographer, known for his role as a professional dancer on the Irish version of Dancing with the Stars. In 2019, Pritchard appeared in the fifth series of the British dating reality series Love Island, finishing in fourth place. In 2021, Pritchard appeared on reality dating show Celebs Go Dating. In 2023, Pritchard competed on Love Island Games. In 2025, he was announced as contestant on series 2 of Love Island: All Stars.

== Early life ==
Pritchard was born on 8 February 1996 in Sneyd Green, Stoke-on-Trent, England.

== Dancing career ==
=== Dancing with the Stars ===
In 2017, Pritchard was announced as one of the professional dancers for the first series of Ireland's Dancing with the Stars. He was partnered with model Thalia Heffernan. They were eliminated in week four of the competition, finishing in tenth place.

In 2018, Pritchard was partnered with businesswoman Norah Casey. On 21 January, Casey and Pritchard became the first couple to be eliminated from the competition.

For the 2019 series, Pritchard was due to be partnered with model Holly Carpenter, but following an attack on 27 December 2018, he was ruled out competing for five weeks. He was replaced by former Strictly Come Dancing professional, Trent Whiddon. In November 2019, Pritchard confirmed that he would not return for a fourth series.

Series	Partner	Place
1	Thalia Heffernan	10th
2	Norah Casey	11th

=== Series 1 (2017) ===
Celebrity partner
Thalia Heffernan; Average: 19; Place: 10th

Week No.	Dance/Song	Judges' score			Total	Result
Week No.	Dance/Song	Redmond	Barry	Benson	Total	Result
1	No dance performed	–	–	–	–	No elimination
2	Quickstep / "Counting Stars"	5	5	6	16	No elimination
3	Rumba / "High Hopes"	7	7	7	21	Safe
4	Jive / "Happy"	6	7	7	20	Eliminated

=== Series 2 (2018) ===
Celebrity partner
Norah Casey; Average: 16; Place: 11th

Week No.	Dance/Song	Judges' score			Total	Result
Week No.	Dance/Song	Redmond	Barry	Benson	Total	Result
1	No dance performed	–	–	–	–	No elimination
2	Foxtrot / "Nora"	5	5	5	15	No elimination
3	Paso Doble / "Señorita"	5	6	6	17	Eliminated

== Other ventures ==
=== Television ===
In June 2019, Pritchard began appearing as a contestant on the fifth series of the ITV2 dating reality series Love Island. In July 2019, it was announced that Pritchard, along with his brother AJ, would appear as guest choreographers on the BBC Three reality series RuPaul's Drag Race UK. In December 2019 Pritchard appeared alongside his Love Island colleague Tommy Fury in a series called The Boxer and The Ballroom Dancer on ITV2 in which they swapped careers, with Pritchard taking up boxing and Fury trying ballroom dancing. 2020 saw him appear in BBC One's The Greatest Dancer as a receptionist. Later that year, it was announced that he would be starring in Celebs Go Dating: The Mansion. In February 2021, it was announced that Pritchard would be making his acting debut in the Channel 4 soap opera Hollyoaks, alongside his brother. He portrayed the role of Jacob; their acting abilities were the subject of widespread criticism. In February 2023, Pritchard competed on the reality-competition series The Challenge UK. In November 2023, Pritchard was a contestant on the first season of Love Island Games. In January 2025, Pritchard was announced as a contestant on Love Island: All Stars. In March 2026, Pritchard was confirmed as a contestant on season 4 of Celebrity Ex on the Beach.

=== Boxing ===
On 23 February 2025, Pritchard announced that he would be partaking in a Survivor Tag boxing bout on KSI's Misfits Boxing, consisting of himself, jewellery collector Godson Umeh, influencer Big Tobz, and former MFB heavyweight champion Tempo Arts. The bout was originally scheduled to take place on 12 April at the Valliant Live in Derby on Misfits 22 – Blinders & Brawls, but was later rescheduled for May 16 after Misfits 21 – Unfinished Business, was cancelled following KSI withdrawing. During the bout, Tobz was the first to be eliminated after the third round, with Umeh following after the fourth. The final round was a traditional one on one bout between Pritchard and Arts, with Arts being declared the winner accumulating 138–142 points.

== Personal life ==
From 2016 Pritchard was in a relationship with fellow Dancing with the Stars professional dancer, Emily Barker. In early 2019 it was reported the couple were no longer an item.

On 27 December 2018, he and his brother AJ, along with two others, were attacked in an "unprovoked assault" on a night out in Nantwich. He needed an emergency operation to his knee and was unable to appear on Dancing with the Stars. A 20-year-old man was arrested and released.

In late 2019, Pritchard briefly dated Maura Higgins following their appearance together on Love Island. In March 2020, Higgins confirmed that they had split.

Pritchard began a relationship with Ekin-Su Cülcüloğlu after meeting on the second series of Love Island: All Stars in early 2025. They announced their split a few months later, in May of that year.

== Boxing record ==
=== Survivor Tag ===
1 fight	0 wins	1 loss
By decision	0	1

No.	Result	Record	Opponents	Type	Round, time	Date	Location	Notes
1	Loss	0–1	Tempo Arts	PTS	5	16 May 2025	Vaillant Live, Derby, England	Arts won on points. Tobz was eliminated after the third round. Umeh was eliminated after the fourth round.
1	Loss	0–1	Big Tobz	PTS	5	16 May 2025	Vaillant Live, Derby, England	Arts won on points. Tobz was eliminated after the third round. Umeh was eliminated after the fourth round.
1	Loss	0–1	Godson Umeh	PTS	5	16 May 2025	Vaillant Live, Derby, England	Arts won on points. Tobz was eliminated after the third round. Umeh was eliminated after the fourth round.
