= Amir Anderson =

American boxer (born 2004)

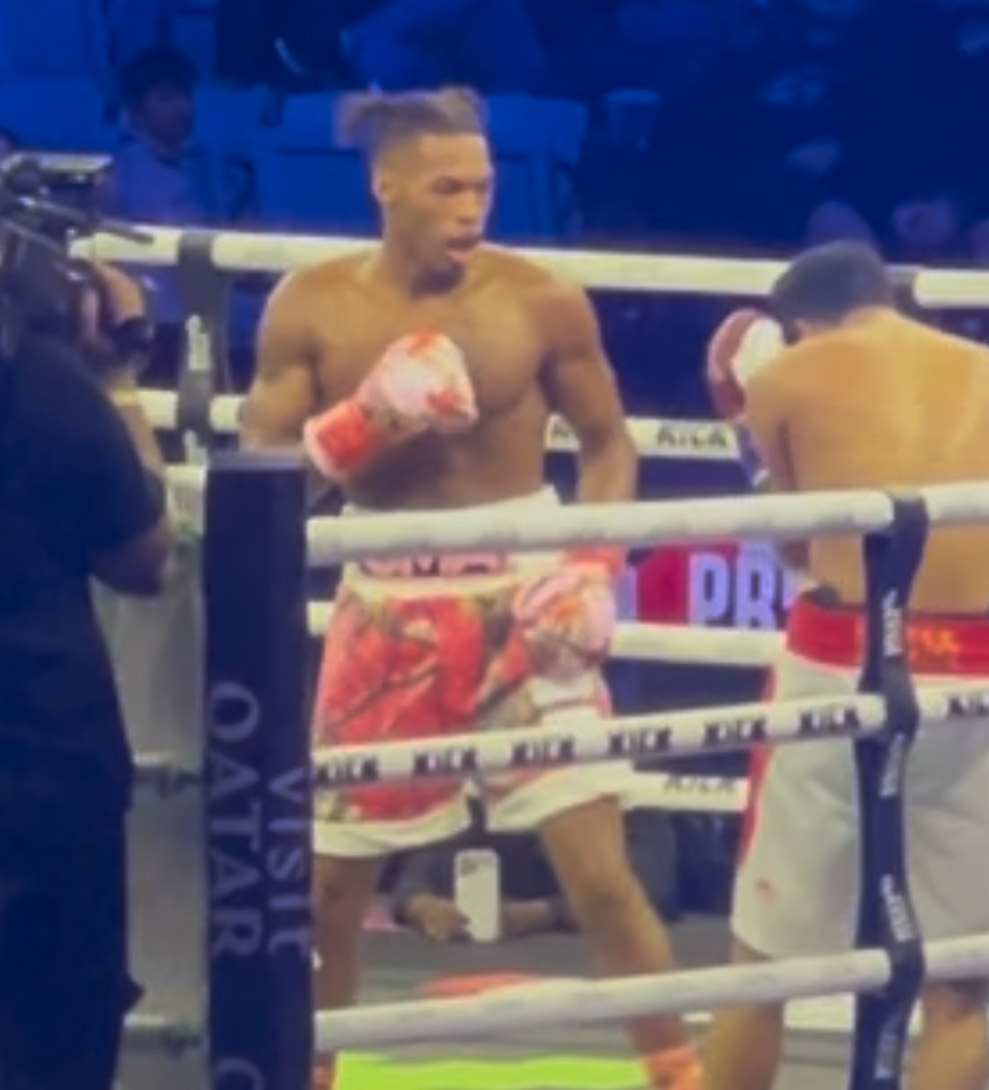
- Anderson in 2024

Personal information
- Nickname: Cashman
- Born: Amir Oshea Anderson; January 28, 2004 (age 22) Syracuse, New York, U.S.
- Height: 6 ft 0 in (183 cm)
- Weight: Middleweight

Boxing career
- Reach: 76 in (193 cm)
- Stance: Orthodox

Boxing record
- Total fights: 9
- Wins: 9
- Win by KO: 8

Amir Oshea Anderson (born January 28, 2004) is an American middleweight professional boxer. Known by his ring name Cashman, he is currently signed to KSI's MF Pro.

== Amateur career ==
Anderson accumulated an amateur record of 40–8. During this time, he competed in Golden Gloves tournaments. He would win the 2023 edition after defeating Jonathan Montalvo via Unanimous Decision in the final.

== Professional career ==
Anderson announced on July 2, 2024 that he had signed a multi fight deal with English influencer KSI's Misfits Boxing under their MF Pro division. Anderson made his professional debut a month later on August 10 at the James L. Knight Center in Miami, Florida against Kijonti Davis (1–5) on the undercard of MF & DAZN: X Series 16. Anderson defeated Davis via technical knockout in the third round.

Three months later on November 28, Anderson fought Neeraj Saini (6–6) at the Lusail Sports Arena in Doha on the undercard of MF & DAZN: X Series 19 – Qatar: The Supercard. Anderson became the first professional boxer to have a sanctioned bout in Qatar after defeating Saini via technical knockout in the second round.

On February 23, 2025, Anderson announced his United Kingdom debut was set to take place on March 29 at Manchester Arena in Manchester on the undercard of Misfits 21 – Unfinished Business. However, on March 21 the event was postponed indefinitely and later cancelled after KSI, who was headlining the event, fell ill. Anderson was later rescheduled for May 16 at the Valliant Live in Derby on the new Misfits 21 event, now billed as Blinders & Brawls, against Ernesto Olvera (13–8–1). Anderson defeated Olvera via technical knockout in the third round.

On August 30, Anderson returned to the United Kingdom and fought Vitor Siqueira (8–1) at Manchester Arena in Manchester on the undercard of Misfits 22 – Ring of Thrones. This bout was Anderson's first eight rounder in which he defeated Siqueira via technical knockout in the fifth round. On November 9, Anderson earned his first knockout victory against Dedrick Bell (34–39–1) on the MF Duel undercard. Anderson was nominated for Fighter of the Year at the 2025 Misfits Awards.

Only one month later, Anderson fought Joe Laws (15–3) in the United Arab Emirates on December 20 at Dubai Duty Free Tennis Stadium in Dubai, defeating him via technical knockout in the second round. The bout took part of the Misfits Mania – The Fight Before Christmas undercard and was for the inaugural in house pro middleweight championship, Anderson's first title since turning professional.

In April 2026, Anderson fought Jordan Dujan (10–6) at The O2 Arena in London, England on the Derek Chisora vs. Deontay Wilder undercard. The bout was a part of MF Pro's official launch event after being rebranded from Wasserman Boxing, and becoming a sister company with Misfits Boxing. Anderson defeated Dujan via technical knockout in the eighth round, moving to an impressive 7–0 with 7 KOs.

Two months later, Anderson earnt his second professional title after defeating undefeated boxer Jonas Sylvain (9–0). The bout went all 10 rounds, earning Anderson his first unanimous decision victory and earning the vacant WBC US Silver middleweight title.

== Personal life ==
Anderson graduated from George Fowler High School in 2022.

== Professional boxing record ==
9 fights	9 wins	0 losses
By knockout	8	0
By decision	1	0

No.	Result	Record	Opponent	Type	Round, time	Date	Location	Notes
9	Win	9–0	Daniel Buciuc	KO	3 (8), 0:23	Nov 20, 2026	Fantasy Springs Resort Casino, Indio, California, U.S.	
8	Win	8–0	Jonas Sylvain	UD	10	Jun 19, 2026	Thunder Studios, Long Beach, California, U.S.	Won vacant WBC US Silver middleweight title
7	Win	7–0	Jordan Dujon	TKO	8 (8), 2:19	Apr 4, 2026	The O2 Arena, London, England	
6	Win	6–0	Joe Laws	TKO	2 (8), 2:43	Dec 20, 2025	Dubai Duty Free Tennis Stadium, Dubai, U.A.E.	Won inaugural MF Pro middleweight title
5	Win	5–0	Dedrick Bell	KO	1 (8), 2:56	Nov 9, 2025	Nashville Municipal Auditorium, Nashville, Tennessee, U.S.	
4	Win	4–0	Vitor Siqueira	TKO	5 (8), 0:55	Aug 30, 2025	Manchester Arena, Manchester, England	
3	Win	3–0	Ernesto Olvera	TKO	3 (6), 1:30	May 16, 2025	Valliant Live, Derby, England	
2	Win	2–0	Neeraj Saini	TKO	2 (6), 1:13	Nov 28, 2024	Lusail Sports Arena, Doha, Qatar	
1	Win	1–0	Kijonti Davis	TKO	3 (6), 2:54	Aug 10, 2024	James L. Knight Center, Miami, Florida, U.S.	
