= Darren Till =

British mixed martial artist and professional boxer (born 1992)

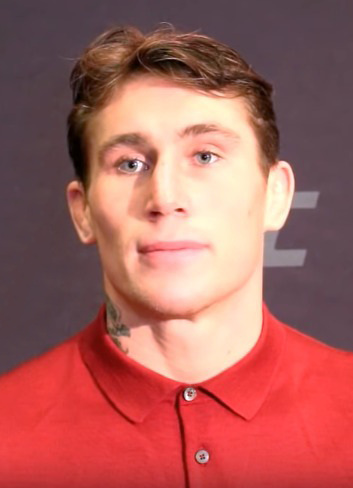
- Till in 2018
- Born: 24 December 1992 (age 33); Liverpool, Merseyside, England
- Other names: The Gorilla
- Height: 6 ft 0 in (183 cm)
- Weight: 185 lb (84 kg; 13 st 3 lb)
- Division: Middleweight (2013–2014; 2019–2023); Welterweight (2014–2019); Bridgerweight (Boxing)
- Reach: 74 1/2 in (189 cm)
- Style: Muay Thai
- Fighting out of: Liverpool, Merseyside, England
- Team: Astra Fight Team (Brazil); Team Kaobon (England); MTK Global
- Rank: Purple belt in Luta Livre Esportiva
- Years active: 2013–present

Professional boxing record
- Total: 3
- Wins: 3
- By knockout: 2

Kickboxing record
- Total: 44
- Wins: 44
- By knockout: 33

Mixed martial arts record
- Total: 24
- Wins: 18
- By knockout: 10
- By submission: 2
- By decision: 6
- Losses: 5
- By knockout: 1
- By submission: 3
- By decision: 1
- Draws: 1

Amateur record
- Total: 3
- Wins: 3
- By knockout: 2
- By decision: 1

Other information
- Boxing record from BoxRec
- Mixed martial arts record from Sherdog

Darren Till (born 24 December 1992) is an English professional mixed martial artist, former Muay Thai fighter, and professional boxer. As a boxer, he is the current MFB bridgerweight champion. Born in Liverpool, Till started his Muay Thai training at the age of 12 and turned professional three years later, before transitioning to MMA. He competed in the Ultimate Fighting Championship (UFC), where he fought in both the welterweight and middleweight divisions, and challenged for the UFC Welterweight Championship in September 2018. He made his boxing debut in January 2025 and his bare-knuckle boxing debut in the BKFC the following year.

== Early life ==
Till was born in Liverpool, where he would frequently get into altercations. He began training in Muay Thai at the age of 12. He dropped out of high school at the age of 14 to focus on the sport, turning professional a year later and beginning to train in MMA with Team Kaobon at the age of 17. During his teenage years, he would live in different places such as his gym and relatives' houses after an incident he had with his mother which got him kicked out of the family home. In August 2012, he was stabbed twice in the back after confronting a large group of men at a party. The knife missed his main artery by one mm, with doctors calling him lucky to be alive.

Following the incident, Till's coach Colin Heron advised him to move to Brazil to train with a former Team Kaobon coach to avoid troubles in his hometown. He subsequently joined Astra Fight Team in Balneário Camboriú, despite being unable to speak Portuguese and with minimal knowledge of grappling. While he planned to spend six months in South America, he stayed for three and a half years and welcomed a daughter with his girlfriend in Brazil. In late 2016, he returned to England to be reunited with Heron at Team Kaobon. His daughter and then-girlfriend remained in Brazil; in 2018, he revealed he had not seen his daughter for over a year.

== Mixed martial arts career ==
=== Early career ===
Till spent most of his early MMA career in Brazil under the guidance of Astra Fight Team. He went 3–0 as an amateur in England before making the move to South America, and turned professional in February 2013. Till had 11 fights in Brazil and one in Argentina prior to joining the UFC, with just two going to a decision. In 2013, he fought eight times as a middleweight before competing at welterweight in late 2014.

=== Ultimate Fighting Championship ===
==== 2015 ====
Replacing injured TJ Waldburger, Till faced Brazilian Wendell de Oliveira Marques in his UFC debut on nine days' notice at UFC Fight Night 67 on 30 May 2015. He knocked out Oliveira and secured his first UFC win.

Till next faced Nicolas Dalby on 24 October 2015 at UFC Fight Night 76. After a back and forth fight, the bout was scored a majority draw. Both participants were awarded the Fight of the Night bonus.

==== 2017 ====
After a significant shoulder injury and various personal issues kept him out of action for an extended period of time, Till returned to face Jessin Ayari on 28 May 2017 at UFC Fight Night 109. He missed the non-title Welterweight limit of 171 pounds by 5 pounds, and had to give 20 percent of his fight earnings to his opponent. Till won the fight via unanimous decision.

On 1 August 2017, Till announced that he had signed a new, five-fight deal with the UFC.

Till faced Bojan Veličković on 2 September 2017 at UFC Fight Night 115. Till won the fight via unanimous decision.

Till faced Donald Cerrone on 21 October 2017 at UFC Fight Night 118. He won the fight via TKO in the first round. This win earned him the Performance of the Night bonus award.

==== 2018 ====
Till faced former UFC Welterweight title challenger Stephen Thompson at UFC Fight Night 130 on 27 May 2018. At the weigh-ins, Till weighed in at 174.5 pounds, 3.5 pounds over the Welterweight non-title fight limit of 171. After negotiating with Thompson's team, the bout proceeded at a catchweight with the stipulation that Till could not weigh more than 188 pounds on the day of the fight. Till also forfeited 30 percent of his purse to Thompson. Till won the fight via a controversial unanimous decision. 22 of 25 media outlets scored the bout in favor of Thompson.

==== Title shot ====
Till was given the opportunity to face Tyron Woodley on 8 September 2018 at UFC 228, challenging him for the UFC Welterweight Championship. He lost the fight via D'Arce choke submission in the second round. This was Till's first loss in his MMA career.

==== 2019 ====
Despite talks of a potential move up to Middleweight, Till stayed at Welterweight and faced Jorge Masvidal on 16 March 2019 at UFC Fight Night 147. Till lost the fight by knockout in the second round. Both participants were awarded a Fight of the Night bonus award.

==== Move to middleweight ====
On 26 August, it was announced Till was returning to the middleweight division to face Kelvin Gastelum at UFC 244 on 2 November. He won the fight via split decision.

==== 2020 ====
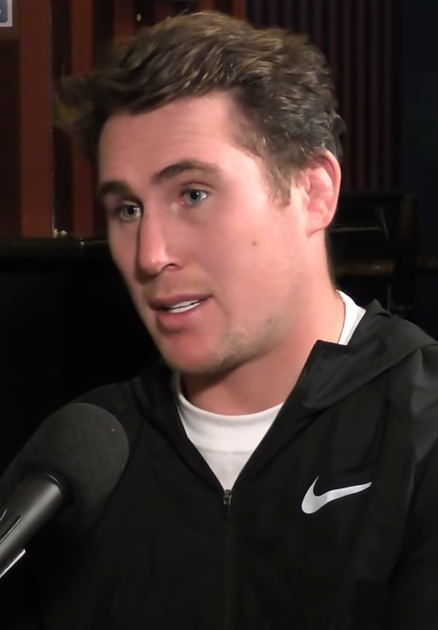
Till in 2020

Till faced Robert Whittaker on 26 July 2020 at UFC on ESPN: Whittaker vs. Till. He lost the fight via unanimous decision.

Till was scheduled to face Jack Hermansson on 5 December 2020 at UFC on ESPN 19. However, it was announced on 6 November that Till was forced to withdraw from the bout due to an injury. He was replaced by Kevin Holland, who was later replaced by Marvin Vettori.

==== 2021 ====
Till was scheduled to face Marvin Vettori on 10 April 2021, at UFC on ABC 2. On the week before the fight, Till was forced to pull out from the match due to a broken collarbone, and he was replaced by Kevin Holland.

Till faced Derek Brunson on 4 September 2021, at UFC Fight Night: Brunson vs. Till. He lost the fight via rear-naked choke submission in round three.

==== 2022 ====
Till was scheduled to face Jack Hermansson on 23 July 2022, at UFC Fight Night 208. He was replaced by Chris Curtis after being forced to withdraw from the bout due to an undisclosed injury.

Till faced Dricus du Plessis on 10 December 2022, at UFC 282. He lost the fight via submission in round three. This fight earned him the Fight of the Night award.

==== Departure ====
On 28 February 2023, it was revealed that Till was released from the UFC after requesting to be let go to pursue other interests.

== Muay Thai and Kickboxing career ==
=== Career summary ===
Till started his Muay Thai training at the age of 12 and turned professional three years later, before transitioning to MMA. According to Till, he amassed a kickboxing record of 44 wins and 0 losses with 33 knockouts.

== Boxing career ==
=== Cancelled bout with Chávez Jr. ===
Till was scheduled to make his professional boxing debut against Mexican former WBC middleweight boxing champion Julio César Chávez Jr. on the Jake Paul vs. Mike Tyson undercard on 20 July 2024 in a six round cruiserweight bout. However, due to a health issue with Mike Tyson, the event was postponed and Till's bout with Chávez Jr. was cancelled.

=== Till vs. Mutie ===
On 1 July, it was announced that Till would face Palestinian mixed martial artist Mohammad Mutie on 6 July 2024, in an exhibition bout at Social Knockout 3 in Dubai, United Arab Emirates. Although a punch that landed to the back of the head of Mutie caused him to fall to the ground, Till was awarded the victory by technical knockout. A brief brawl took place after the bout with Mutie not being pleased with the result.

=== Till vs. Taylor ===
On 17 November, it was announced that Till would make his MF-professional boxing debut against English professional boxer Tommy Fury on 18 January 2025 at MF & DAZN: X Series 20 at the Co-op Live in Manchester. On 6 December however, Fury announced that he had withdrawn from the bout due to Till at the press conference stating he would resort to "MMA tactics" if he was losing the fight. On 29 December, Till's new opponent was announced to be American mixed martial artist Anthony Taylor. Till defeated Taylor via technical knockout in the sixth round.

=== Till vs. Stewart ===
On 13 February 2025, Misfits Boxing confirmed that Till would return to the ring on 29 March at Manchester Arena in Manchester on the Misfits 21 – Unfinished Business undercard. On 15 February, Till's opponent was announced to be English mixed martial artist Darren Stewart. However, on 21 March the event was postponed after the headline fighter KSI fell ill. On 17 April, the bout was rescheduled for 16 May at the Vaillant Live in Derby, becoming the new headliner for Misfits 21 – Blinders & Brawls. Till knocked down Stewart twice, once in the first round and also in the final seconds of the eighth round as the closing bell rang. He won the fight via unanimous decision, with two judges scoring it 77–74 and the other 77–73 all in favour of Till.

=== Till vs. Rockhold ===
Since defeating Stewart, Till had been attempting to negotiate with fighters for a major bout on a pay-per-view show. Till's manager Lee Eaton, revealed that Nate Diaz, Mike Perry, Carl Froch, and Tyron Woodley had all declined offers to face Till. On 16 July, Till's next bout was announced for 30 August against former UFC Middleweight Champion Luke Rockhold, headlining Misfits 22 – Ring of Thrones at Manchester Arena in Manchester, England. The bout was set for the inaugural inhouse bridgerweight title.

Till won the bout via knockout in the third round. During the bout, he dropped Rockhold in the last ten seconds of the first round, dropped him again in the second, although it was not called as such by the referee, and dropped him for the third and final time in the third round, hitting Rockhold with a five punch combination, capped off with an overhand left that knocked Rockhold completely unconscious.

== Bare-knuckle boxing career ==
In April 2026, Bare Knuckle Fighting Championship announced that Till had signed a multi-fight contract. His first bout took place on 30 May on the BKFC 90 in Birmingham, England. Later that month, his opponent was announced as Aaron Chalmers. Till won the fight via knockout 22 seconds into the second round.

Till faced Yoel Romero on 26 September 2026 at BKFC 94. Till won the bout by unanimous decision.

== Personal life ==
Till has four daughters.

== Controversies ==
On 18 April 2019, Till was arrested in Tenerife after trashing a hotel room when he was asked to leave, and for also stealing a taxi while the driver was loading his luggage into the trunk. Till and four other involved individuals were sentenced for a crime of damage and unauthorised use of a vehicle, and were fined approximately at £10,000.

Till was penalised by Swedish police for driving under the influence of alcohol with over three times the legal limit in his system on 31 July 2022.

On 7 June 2023, Till attended a court in Liverpool, pleading not guilty to charges for driving while disqualified, driving without insurance and obstructing a constable in execution of duty. Following the hearing, he was granted bail and set to return to the court on 30 August. In the 30 August hearing at Liverpool Magistrates' Court, Till pleaded guilty for the first two offences, while the third was dropped by the prosecution. The hearing was subsequently adjourned.

== Championships and achievements ==
=== Mixed martial arts ===
- Ultimate Fighting Championship
  - Performance of the Night (One time) vs. Donald Cerrone
  - Fight of the Night (Three times) vs. Nicolas Dalby, Jorge Masvidal, and Dricus du Plessis
  - UFC.com Awards
    - 2015: Ranked #9 Fight of the Year vs. Nicolas Dalby
- Pundit Arena
  - 2017 Breakthrough Fighter of the Year
- MMADNA.nl
  - 2017 Rising Star of the Year.

=== Muay Thai / Kickboxing ===
- ISKA Junior Champion, European K1-Rules Champion

=== Boxing ===
- MFB Bridgerweight Champion (Current, One Time)
- Prime Fighter of the Night (One time) vs. Anthony Taylor
- Prime Knockout of the Night (One time) vs. Luke Rockhold

== Mixed martial arts record ==
Professional record breakdown
24 matches	18 wins	5 losses
By knockout	10	1
By submission	2	3
By decision	6	1
Draws	1	

Res.	Record	Opponent	Method	Event	Date	Round	Time	Location	Notes
Loss	18–5–1	Dricus du Plessis	Submission (face crank)	UFC 282	10 December 2022	3	2:43	Las Vegas, Nevada, United States	Fight of the Night.
Loss	18–4–1	Derek Brunson	Submission (rear-naked choke)	UFC Fight Night: Brunson vs. Till	4 September 2021	3	2:13	Las Vegas, Nevada, United States	
Loss	18–3–1	Robert Whittaker	Decision (unanimous)	UFC on ESPN: Whittaker vs. Till	26 July 2020	5	5:00	Abu Dhabi, United Arab Emirates	
Win	18–2–1	Kelvin Gastelum	Decision (split)	UFC 244	2 November 2019	3	5:00	New York City, New York, United States	Return to Middleweight.
Loss	17–2–1	Jorge Masvidal	KO (punches)	UFC Fight Night: Till vs. Masvidal	16 March 2019	2	3:05	London, Greater London, England	Fight of the Night.
Loss	17–1–1	Tyron Woodley	Submission (brabo choke)	UFC 228	8 September 2018	2	4:19	Dallas, Texas, United States	For the UFC Welterweight Championship.
Win	17–0–1	Stephen Thompson	Decision (unanimous)	UFC Fight Night: Thompson vs. Till	27 May 2018	5	5:00	Liverpool, Merseyside, England	Catchweight (174.5 lb; 79.15 kg) bout; Till missed weight.
Win	16–0–1	Donald Cerrone	TKO (punches)	UFC Fight Night: Cowboy vs. Till	21 October 2017	1	4:20	Gdańsk, Pomeranian Voivodeship, Poland	Performance of the Night.
Win	15–0–1	Bojan Veličković	Decision (unanimous)	UFC Fight Night: Volkov vs. Struve	2 September 2017	3	5:00	Rotterdam, South Holland, Netherlands	
Win	14–0–1	Jessin Ayari	Decision (unanimous)	UFC Fight Night: Gustafsson vs. Teixeira	28 May 2017	3	5:00	Stockholm, Sweden	Catchweight (176 lb; 79.83 kg) bout; Till missed weight.
Draw	13–0–1	Nicolas Dalby	Draw (majority)	UFC Fight Night: Holohan vs. Smolka	24 October 2015	3	5:00	Dublin, Leinster, Rep. of Ireland	Fight of the Night.
Win	13–0	Wendell de Oliveira	KO (elbows)	UFC Fight Night: Condit vs. Alves	30 May 2015	2	1:37	Goiânia, Goiás, Brazil	
Win	12–0	Laerte Costa e Silva	TKO (punches)	MMA Sanda Combat	9 May 2015	4	2:01	Apucarana, Paraná, Brazil	
Win	11–0	Guillermo Martinez Ayme	Decision (unanimous)	Arena Tour MMA	20 December 2014	3	5:00	Buenos Aires, Argentina	
Win	10–0	Sergio Matias	Submission (toe hold)	Aspera FC 14	29 November 2014	2	3:05	Lages, Santa Catarina, Brazil	Welterweight debut.
Win	9–0	Deivid Caubiack	KO (punch)	Aspera FC 11	30 August 2014	1	1:35	Curitibanos, Santa Catarina, Brazil	
Win	8–0	Cristiano Marquesotti	Submission (inverted triangle choke)	Curitibanos AMG Fight Champion	9 November 2013	1	4:45	Curitibanos, Santa Catarina, Brazil	
Win	7–0	Edson Jairo da Silva	TKO (retirement)	Predador Campos Fight 2	5 October 2013	3	4:00	Campos Novos, São Paulo, Brazil	
Win	6–0	Alexandre Pereira	KO (punch)	Encontro dos Espartanos	10 August 2013	3	2:47	Blumenau, Santa Catarina, Brazil	
Win	5–0	Pedro Keller de Souza	KO (punch)	Sparta MMA 7	15 June 2013	2	1:54	Balneário Camboriú, Santa Catarina, Brazil	
Win	4–0	Paulo Batista	KO (punch)	Sparta MMA 6	28 May 2013	1	1:24	Itajaí, Santa Catarina, Brazil	
Win	3–0	Junior Dietz	TKO (punches)	São João Super Fight	4 May 2013	1	2:18	São João Batista, Santa Catarina, Brazil	
Win	2–0	Muriel Giassi	TKO (punches)	Tavares Combat 6	6 April 2013	2	2:50	Palhoça, Santa Catarina, Brazil	
Win	1–0	Luciano Oliveira Ribeiro	Decision (unanimous)	Sparta MMA 3	23 February 2013	3	5:00	Balneário Camboriú, Santa Catarina Brazil	Middleweight debut.

== Boxing record ==
=== Professional ===
1 fight	1 win	0 losses
By knockout	1	0

No.	Result	Record	Opponent	Type	Round, time	Date	Location	Notes
1	Win	1–0	Luke Rockhold	KO	3 (6), 1:01	30 Aug 2025	Manchester Arena, Manchester, England	Won inaugural MFB bridgerweight title

=== MF–Professional ===
2 fights	2 wins	0 losses
By knockout	1	0
By decision	1	0

No.	Result	Record	Opponent	Type	Round, time	Date	Location	Notes
2	Win	2–0	Darren Stewart	UD	8	16 May 2025	Vaillant Live, Derby, England	
1	Win	1–0	Anthony Taylor	TKO	6 (8), 1:05	18 Jan 2025	Co-op Live, Manchester, England	

=== Exhibition ===
1 fight	1 win	0 losses
By knockout	1	0

No.	Result	Record	Opponent	Type	Round, time	Date	Location	Notes
1	Win	1–0	Mohammad Mutie	TKO	2 (4), 0:57	6 Jul 2024	Coca-Cola Arena, Dubai, UAE	

== Bare knuckle record ==
Professional record breakdown
2 matches	2 wins	0 losses
By knockout	1	0
By decision	1	0

Res.	Record	Opponent	Method	Event	Date	Round	Time	Location	Notes
Win	2–0	Yoel Romero	Decision (unanimous)	BKFC 94	Sep 26, 2026	5	2:00	Manchester, England	
Win	1–0	Aaron Chalmers	KO (punch)	BKFC 90	May 30, 2026	2	0:22	Birmingham, England	Bare Knuckle debut.

== Pay-per-view bouts ==
=== MMA ===
No.	Event	Fight	Date	Venue	City	PPV buys
1.	UFC 228	Woodley vs. Till	September 8, 2018	American Airlines Center	Dallas, Texas, United States	130,000

=== Boxing ===
No.	Date	Fight	Billing	Network	Buys	Revenue	Source(s)
1	30 August 2025	Till vs Rockhold	Ring of Thrones	DAZN	Undisclosed	—N/a	—N/a
Total

== See also ==
- List of male boxers
- List of male kickboxers
- List of male mixed martial artists
- List of mixed martial artists with professional boxing records
- List of multi-sport athletes
- List of prizefighters with professional boxing and kickboxing records
