= Mahmoud Fawzy =

Egyptian Greco-Roman wrestler

Mahmoud Fawzy Sebie
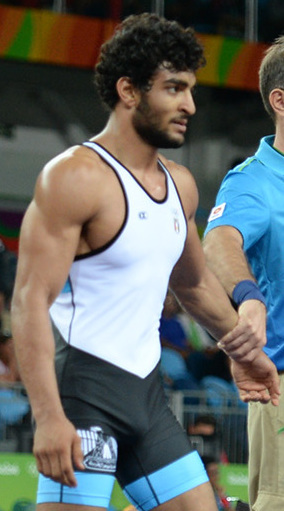
- Fawzy during the 2016 Olympics
- Born: 20 June 1992 (age 34); Egypt
- Height: 5 ft 11 in (1.80 m)
- Weight: 165 lb (75 kg; 11.8 st)
- Division: Welterweight; Super lightweight
- Reach: 75 in (191 cm)
- Style: Wrestling
- Team: MMA Masters (2020–present)
- Wrestling: Olympic Greco-Roman Wrestling
- Years active: 2020–present

Mixed martial arts record
- Total: 9
- Wins: 6
- By knockout: 5
- By submission: 1
- Losses: 3
- By knockout: 3

Other information
- Mixed martial arts record from Sherdog

Mahmoud Fawzy Sebie (born 20 June 1992) is an Egyptian-American Greco-Roman wrestler and professional mixed martial artist. As a wrestler Sebie was a 2024 Pan American Championships finalist.

== Wrestling career ==
He is a four-time Arab champion, five-time African champion, won a gold medal at the African cup, best wrestler in Africa 2015, a silver medal in Nikolai bitrov Bulgaria January 2016, a silver medal in Spain Grand Prix May 2016, a bronze medal in Germany grand bronze tournament June 2016, and won silver medal at Dave Schultz tournament Colorado US January 2017. He competed in the men's Greco-Roman 75 kg event at the 2016 Summer Olympics, in which he was eliminated in the round of 32 by Elvin Mursaliyev.

In 2018, Sebie spoke out about corruption in his native Egyptian wrestling federation and claimed he will not compete for the Egypt's national team in wrestling anymore. He subsequently moved to United States in hopes to represent Team USA in 2020 Summer Olympics, but as COVID-19 pandemic postponed the Olympics, Mahmoud decided retire from the sport in 2020.

He debuted for Real American Freestyle (RAF) at RAF 06 on 28 February 2026, losing by technical fall to Zahid Valencia.

== Mixed martial arts career ==
=== Early career ===
After he retired from wrestling, a friend suggested he try mixed martial arts. In January 2021, news surfaced that Sebie was scheduled to make his professional debut against Jarell Murry at XMMA 8 on 30 January 2021. He won the fight via first-round technical knockout.

Fawzy made his sophomore walk to the cage against Enrique Hernandez Nagrete on 11 June 2021 at iKon Fighting Federation 7. He won the bout via knockout a minute into the bout.

On 7 days turnaround, Fawzy faced Eric Thompson at Gamebred Fighting Championship 1 on 18 June 2021. He won the bout via TKO in the first round.

Fawzy faced Ethan Hughes on 12 November 2021 at Bellator 271. He lost the bout via ground and pound TKO in the third round.

Fawzy faced Itso Babulaidze on 5 August 2022 at PFL 7. He lost the bout via TKO stoppage at the end of the first round.

=== Brave CF ===
Fawzy made his Brave CF debut against Wajdi Missaoui on 12 December 2021 at BRAVE CF 67, knocking out his opponent in the first round.

Fawzy faced Muhammed Kir Ahmet on 18 February 2023 at BRAVE CF 69, knocking out his opponent 38 seconds into the bout.

Fawzy faced Ouessama Zeidi on 19 June 2023 at BRAVE CF 71, submitting his opponent in the first round via rear-naked choke.

== Boxing career ==
On 22 September 2026, Fawzy was announced as Tony Ferguson's new opponent just four days before the event took place. The bout is scheduled for 27 September at the James L. Knight Center in Miami, Florida, US for the MFB middleweight title. On the night, Ferguson defeated Fawzy via second round technical knockout.

== Mixed martial arts record ==
Professional record breakdown
9 matches	6 wins	3 losses
By knockout	5	3
By submission	1	0

Res.	Record	Opponent	Method	Event	Date	Round	Time	Location	Notes
Loss	6–3	Ernesto Rodriguez	TKO (punches)	Tuff-N-Uff 143	25 April 2025	1	3:34	Las Vegas, Nevada, United States	Return to Welterweight. For the vacant Tuff-N-Uff Welterweight Championship.
Win	6–2	Ouessama Zeidi	Submission (rear-naked choke)	Brave CF 71	19 June 2023	1	1:12	Riffa, Bahrain	
Win	5–2	Muhammed Kir Ahmet	KO (punches)	Brave CF 69	18 February 2023	1	0:38	Belgrade, Serbia	
Win	4–2	Wajdi Missaoui	KO (punches)	Brave CF 67	12 December 2021	1	1:28	Riffa, Bahrain	Super Lightweight debut.
Loss	3–2	Itso Babulaidze	TKO (punches)	PFL 7 (2022)	5 August 2022	1	4:30	New York City, New York, United States	
Loss	3–1	Ethan Hughes	TKO (punches)	Bellator 271	12 November 2021	3	4:05	Hollywood, Florida, United States	
Win	3–0	Eric Thompson	TKO (elbows and punches)	Gamebred Bareknuckle MMA 1	18 June 2021	1	1:19	Biloxi, Mississippi, United States	Bare knuckle MMA.
Win	2–0	Enrique Hernandez Negrete	KO (punches)	iKon Fighting Federation 7	11 June 2021	1	1:09	Los Mochis, Mexico	
Win	1–0	Jarell Murry	TKO (punches)	XMMA 1	30 January 2021	1	1:52	West Palm Beach, Florida, United States	Welterweight debut.

== Professional boxing record ==
1 fight	0 wins	1 loss
By knockout	0	1

No.	Result	Record	Opponent	Type	Round, time	Date	Location	Notes
1	Loss	0–1	Tony Ferguson	TKO	2 (6), 0:42	26 Sep 2026	James L. Knight Center, Miami, Florida, US	For MFB middleweight title
