= KSI vs Tommy Fury =

2023 professional crossover boxing match

- Date: 14 October 2023
- Venue: Manchester Arena, Manchester, England

Tale of the tape
Boxer	KSI	Tommy Fury
Nickname	"The Nightmare"	"TNT"
Hometown	Watford, England	Manchester, England
Pre-fight record	4–0 (3 KOs) (Note: On BoxRec, KSI's professional record is 1–0 and his MF-professional record is 3–0–0–1 (3 KOs).)	9–0 (4 KOs)
Age	30 years, 3 months	24 years, 5 months
Height	6 ft 0 in (1.83 m)	6 ft 0 in (1.83 m)
Weight	181.3 lb (82 kg)	182.6 lb (83 kg)
Style	Orthodox	Orthodox
Recognition	MFB cruiserweight champion	

Result
- Fury wins by UD in 6 rounds (57–56, 57–56, 57–56)

Logan Paul vs Dillon Danis
Tale of the tape
Boxer	Logan Paul	Dillon Danis
Nickname	"The Maverick"	"Double D"
Hometown	Westlake, Ohio, U.S.	Parsippany–Troy Hills, New Jersey, U.S.
Pre-fight record	0–1	0–0 (Boxing); 2–0 (MMA)
Age	28 years, 6 months	30 years, 1 month
Height	6 ft 2 in (1.88 m)	6 ft 0 in (1.83 m)
Weight	194.25 lb (88 kg)	195 lb (88 kg)
Style	Orthodox	Southpaw
Recognition		Pan IBJJF Jiu-Jitsu No-Gi Champion

Result
- Paul wins by disqualification in round 6.

MF & DAZN: X Series 10 – The Prime Card, billed as Judgement Day, was a professional crossover boxing event. Whilst the fight card consists of eleven bouts, two cruiserweight bouts served as a double feature. The first, KSI vs Tommy Fury, contested between English internet personality KSI and English professional boxer Tommy Fury. The second, Logan Paul vs Dillon Danis, contested American internet personality and WWE based professional wrestler Logan Paul and American mixed martial artist Dillon Danis.

The event took place at Manchester Arena in Manchester, England on 14 October 2023.

== Background and build-up ==
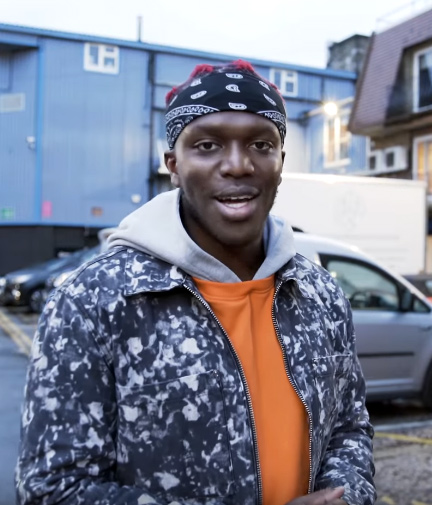
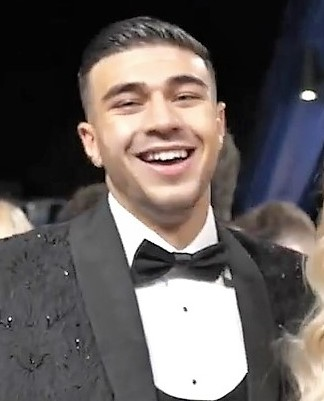
KSI (left) and Tommy Fury (right).

In November 2019, YouTuber KSI won his professional boxing debut after defeating fellow YouTuber Logan Paul via split decision at the Staples Center in Los Angeles. Professional boxer Tommy Fury decided to call out KSI to a bout, but KSI declined.

In February 2023, KSI's long time rival Jake Paul lost to Fury via split decision in Saudi Arabia. Paul and Fury were expected to have an immediate rematch, however plans changed after Paul announced he will be facing mixed martial artist Nate Diaz on 5 August, thus Fury exclaimed his interests in pursuing a bout with KSI or TikToker Salt Papi in the future. On 13 May, KSI fought businessman and professional boxer Joe Fournier as the headliner to MF & DAZN: X Series 007 and originally won via a controversial knockout, but afterward this was overruled and judged a no contest, because of an elbow strike. Shortly after, KSI and Fury shared a stare down after the pair verbally agreeing to face each other next.

On 22 July, during the broadcast of X Series 008, it was announced that X Series 009 will take place on 14 October. On 28 July, it was announced that KSI and Logan Paul would both be headlining X Series 10 – The Prime Card as a double main event, with opponents to be announced shortly after, on 14 October at Manchester Arena in Manchester, England. On 30 July, it was announced that KSI would be facing Fury. On 8 August, it was announced that Paul would face American mixed martial artist Dillon Danis.

=== Press conference ===
The launch press conference took place on 22 August at Wembley Arena in London. Paul brought out a cake for Danis' 30th birthday, which depicted him knocked out while Danis made comments to Paul's fiancée Nina Agdal. Fury's father, John Fury, destroyed the set by launching the tables into the crowd and nearly causing a riot. After the press conference, Paul and American streamer JiDion got into an argument.

The final press conference took place on 12 October in Manchester. Paul brought out Chris Hansen and jokingly mocked that he was "going to catch a predator." Paul and Danis then got into a brawl which resulted in Danis throwing a microphone at Paul's face which led him to be escorted out. Danis and Mike Perry, the backup fighter that was brought to Manchester in case Danis were to withdraw, had a face off.

=== Weigh in ===
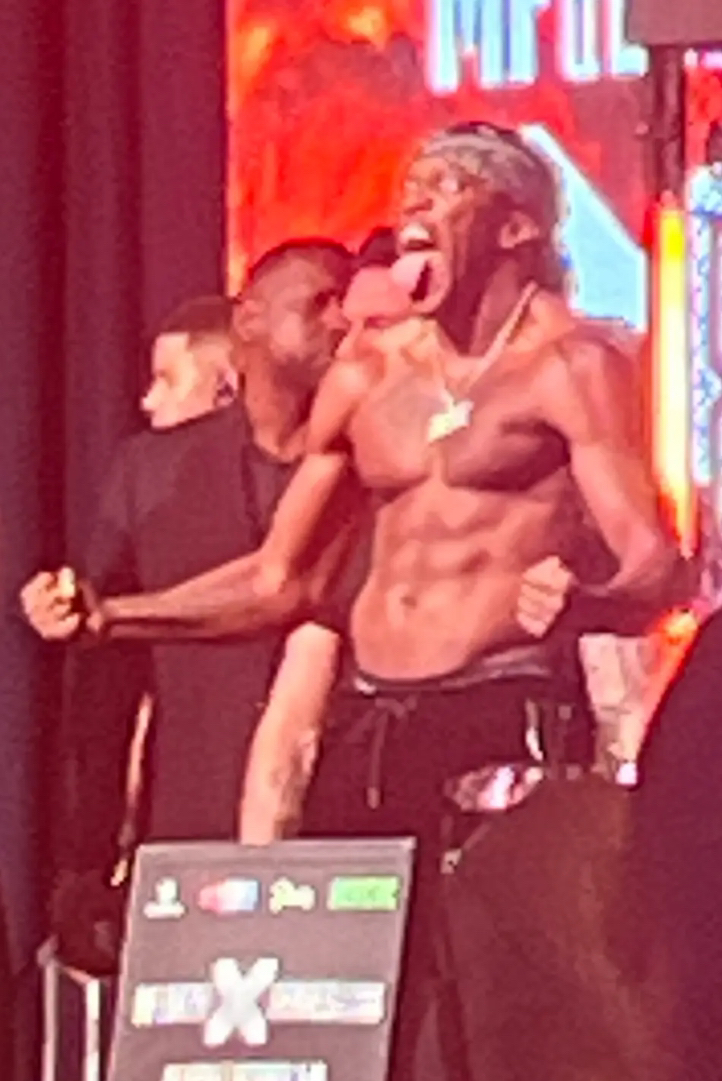
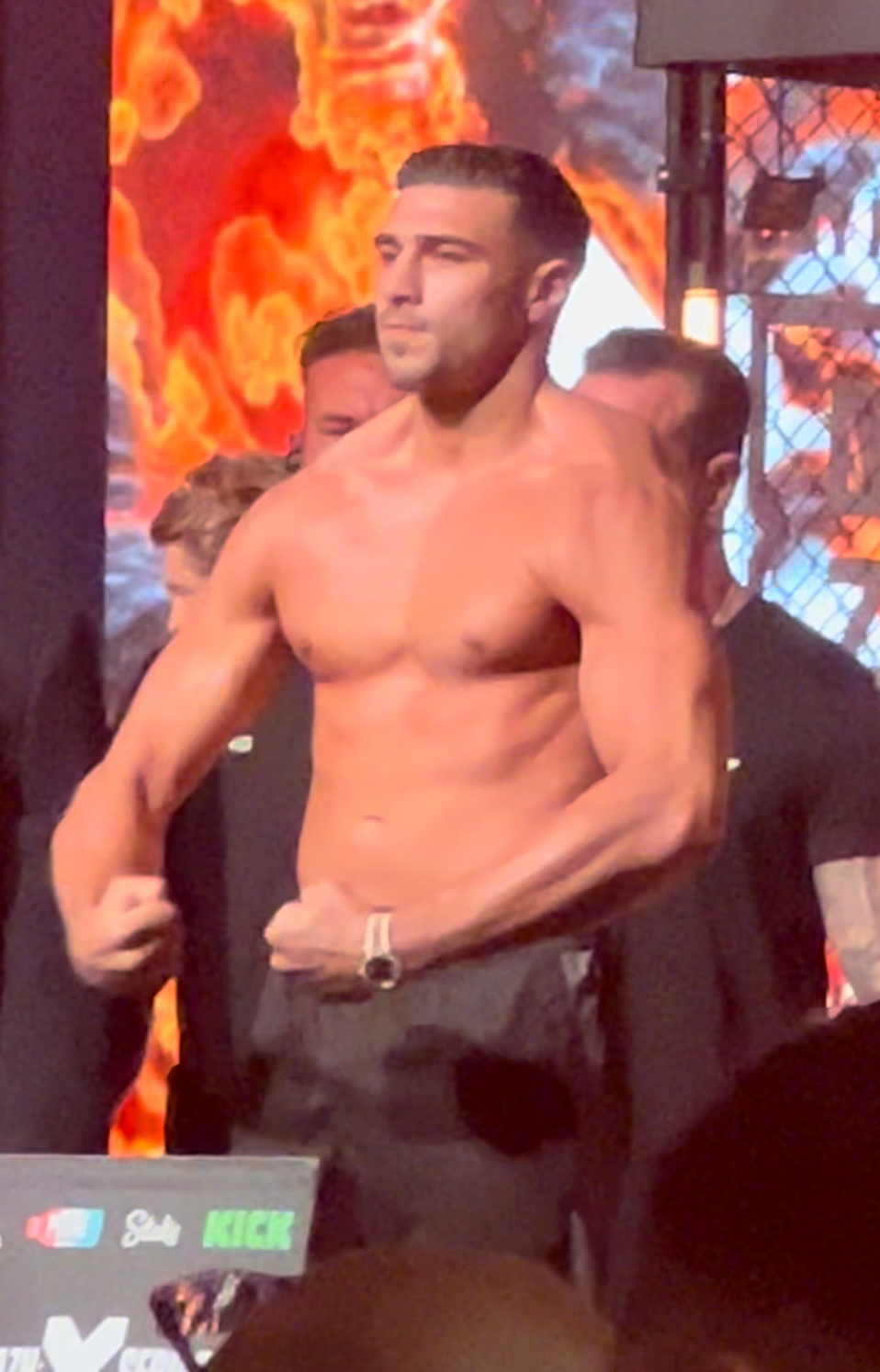
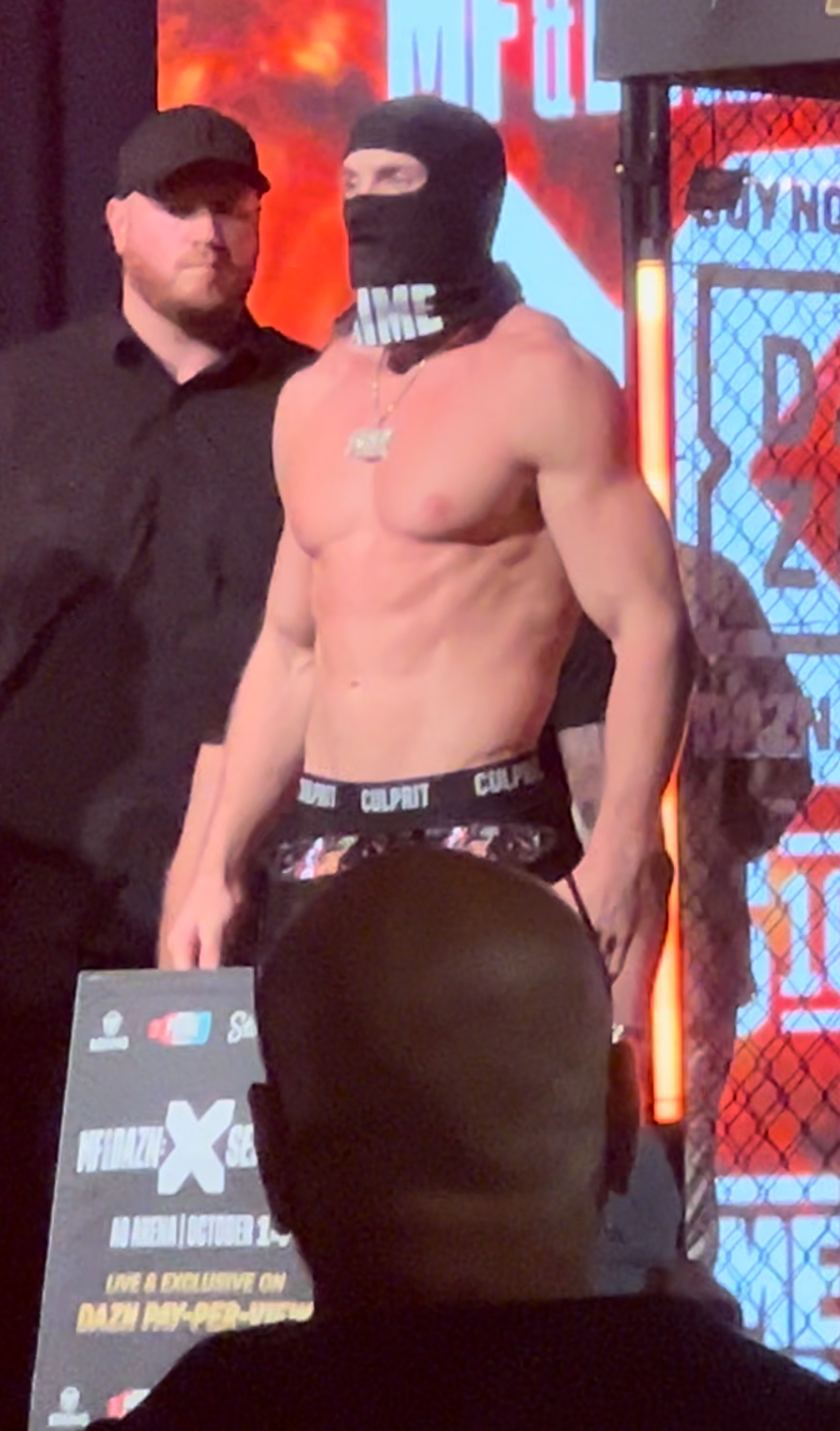
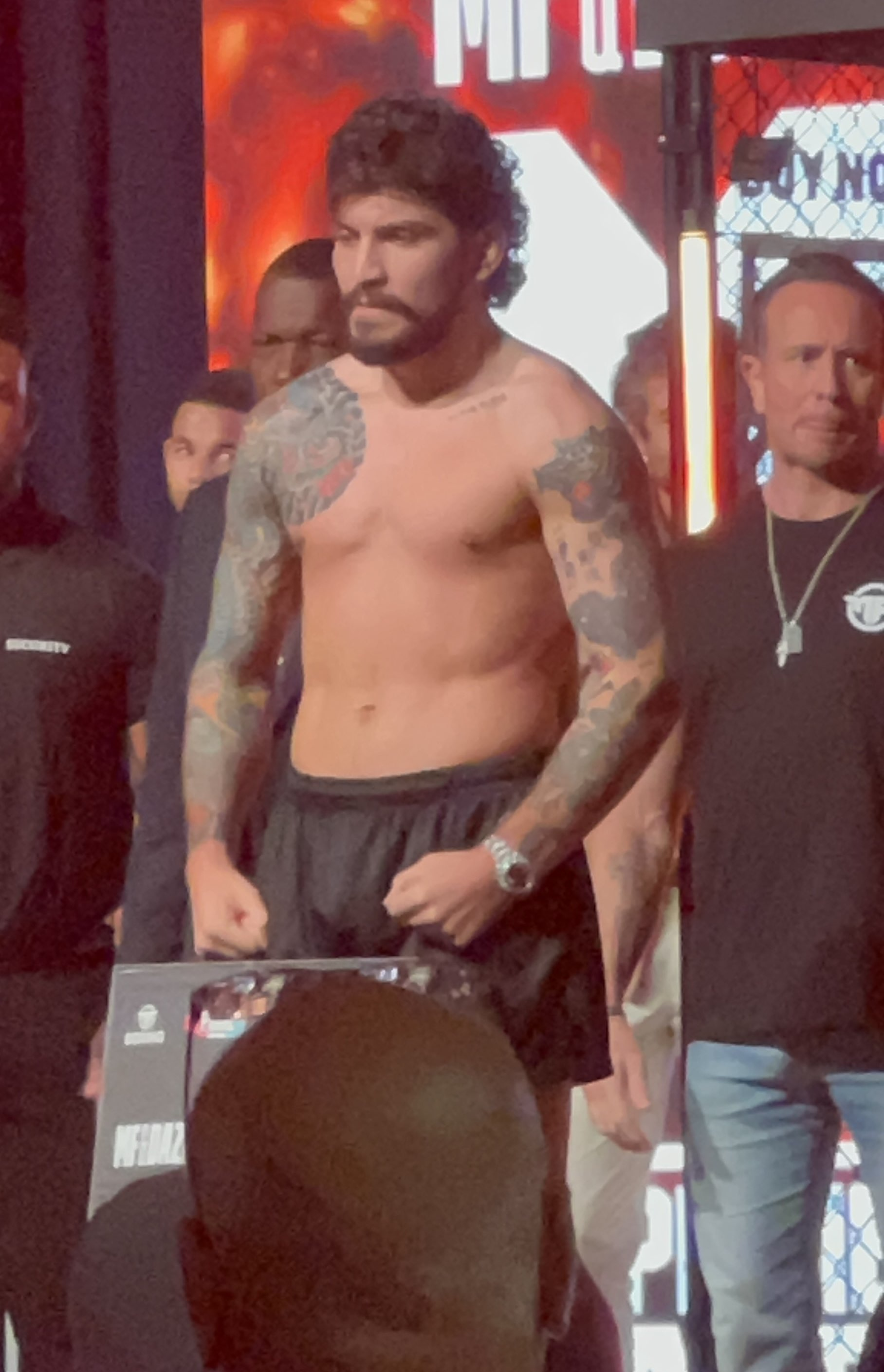
KSI (top left), Fury (top right), Paul (bottom left) and Danis (bottom right)

The weigh in took place 13 October at the Manchester Central Convention Complex in Manchester. Prior to the ceremonial weigh in, Danis accused Paul of missing his contractual weight by weigh in an hour late. The Professional Boxing Association (PBA), whom are the commission, confirmed on Twitter that Paul did not weigh in an hour late as the weigh in window started at 10:00am BST finishing 1:00pm BST.

Paul weighed in at 194.4 Ibs while Danis wighed in at 195 Ibs, reaching the maximum limit in their catchweight agreement. KSI weighed in at 181.3 and Fury weighed in at 182.6 Ibs.

=== Undercard ===
On the undercard, American YouTuber Deen the Great and Iraqi Golden Gloves champion Walid Sharks rematched for the MFB lightweight title after Great defeated Sharks via 3rd round technical knockout on X Series 003. English YouTuber King Kenny and American mixed martial artist Anthony Taylor faced each other for the vacant MFB light heavyweight title. Filipino TikToker Salt Papi and American YouTuber Slim Albaher faced each other for the inaugural MFB middleweight title.

Also on the undercard, Brazilian comedian Whindersson Nunes and American YouTuber My Mate Nate faced each other. A tag team bout took place between "Wassabi Lmao," which features American and Singaporean YouTubers Alex Wassabi and NichLmao, against "Los Pineda Coladas," which features American YouTuber BDave and Mexican professional boxer Luis Alcaraz Pineda for the inaugural MFB middleweight tag team titles.

On the preliminary card, American reality television star Chase DeMoor and English graphic designer Tempo Arts faced each other for the inaugural MFB heavyweight title. English OnlyFans models Astrid Wett and Alexia Grace faced each other for the MFB women's lightweight title. English singer S-X and English rapper DTG faced each other. English rapper Swarmz and English TikToker Ed Matthews faced each other.

== Fight card ==
Weight class		vs		Method	Round	Time	Notes
Main Card (PPV)
Cruiserweight	Tommy Fury	def.	KSI	UD	6		^{Note 1}
Bridgerweight	Logan Paul	def.	Dillon Danis	DQ	6/6	2:55
Middleweight	Slim Albaher	def.	Salt Papi	TKO	4/5	2:54	^{Note 2}
Lightweight	Deen the Great (c)	def.	Walid Sharks	UD	5		^{Note 3}
Light heavyweight	Anthony Taylor	def.	King Kenny	UD	5		^{Note 4}
Light heavyweight	My Mate Nate	def.	Whindersson Nunes	UD	4
Middleweight	Wassabi Lmao (Alex Wassabi & NichLmao)	vs.	Los Pineda Coladas (Luis Alcaraz Pineda & BDave)	SD	4		^{Note 5}
Preliminary Card
Light heavyweight	Ed Matthews	def.	Swarmz	KO	1/3	0:30
Heavyweight	Tempo Arts	def.	Chase DeMoor	SD	4		^{Note 6}
Lightweight	Astrid Wett (c)	def.	Alexia Grace	MD	3		^{Note 7}
Heavyweight	DTG	def.	S-X	TKO	1/3	1:59

^Note 1 Professional bout
^Note 2 For inaugural MFB middleweight title
^Note 3 For MFB lightweight title
^Note 4 For vacant MFB light heavyweight title
^Note 5 Tag team bout
^Note 6 For inaugural MFB heavyweight title
^Note 7 For MFB women's lightweight title

== Fight summary ==
=== Paul vs Danis ===
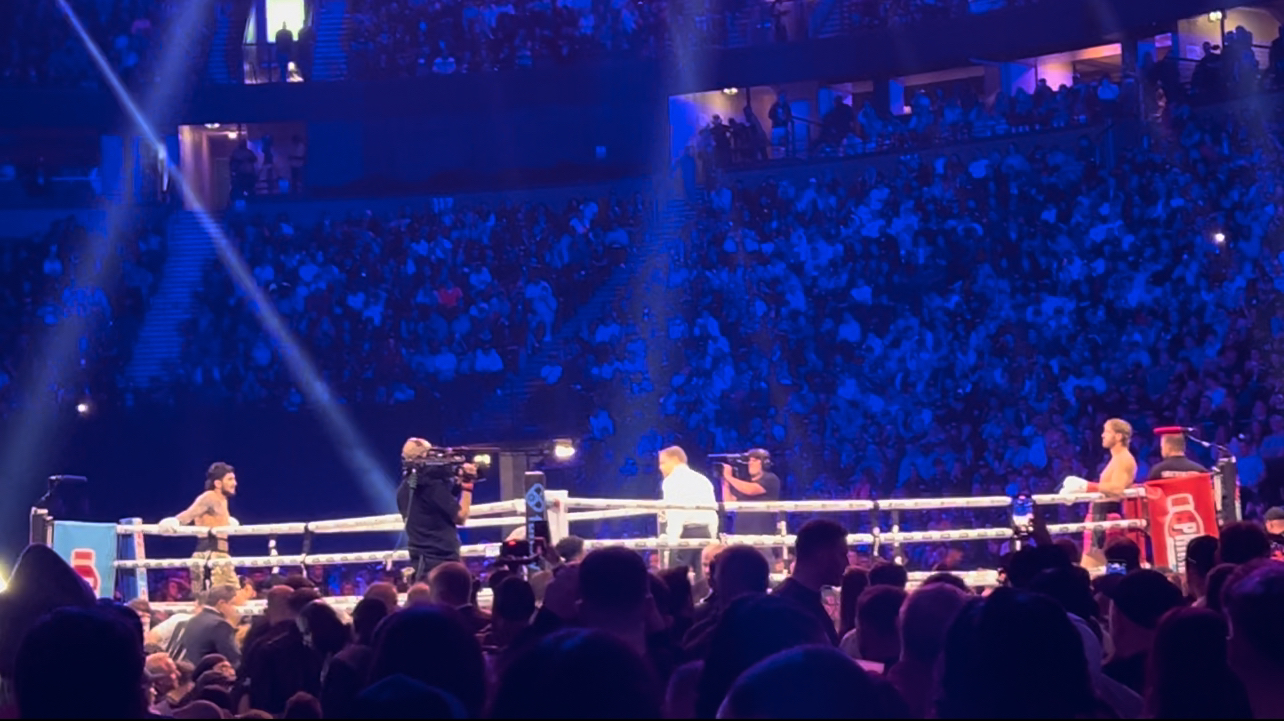
Paul and Danis moments before the start of their bout.

Paul walks out first to "Many Men (Wish Death)" by 50 Cent alongside his brother Jake Paul. Danis then walks out to "Freed from Desire" by Gala. After both men were in the ring, The Star-Spangled Banner was sung, with the majority of the crowd booing.

The 1st round started and Paul entered in an orthodox stance while Danis entered in a southpaw stance. Danis immediately had his guard up while Paul started jabbing. In the 2nd round, Danis had his guard up once again, while Paul continually hit Danis with jabs. Paul also landed a right hand that sends Danis to the ropes. Paul continually swung while Danis had his guard up. In the 3rd round, Danis had yet to throw any significant shots while Paul continued to do so. Danis then rolled onto his back, inviting Paul into his guard. This resulted in the crowd booing while the referee made Danis stand up. In the 4th round, Paul waited for Danis to throw so he can counter. The crowd began to boo once again after the pair were talking to each other. In the 5th round, Paul bags to showboat while Danis allowed it to happen. In the final round, Danis clinched Paul and attempted a guillotine choke which results in Paul slip out and throws a punch at Danis' head. Danis began to chase Paul in the ring before security entered and a brawl took place in the ring with Jake Paul involved.

Winning the fight on all the cards up to that point, Paul won the bout via disqualification as Danis attempted a guillotine choke on Paul. Paul then called out Rey Mysterio for the WWE United States Championship, setting up a match at WWE Crown Jewel.

On 16 October, Danis announced on his Twitter account that he would be appealing the result to the PBA claiming Paul committed "multiple offenses". On 21 October, the PBA announced that Danis has formally submitted an appeal over the disqualification loss to Paul. The result was not changed.

=== KSI vs Fury ===
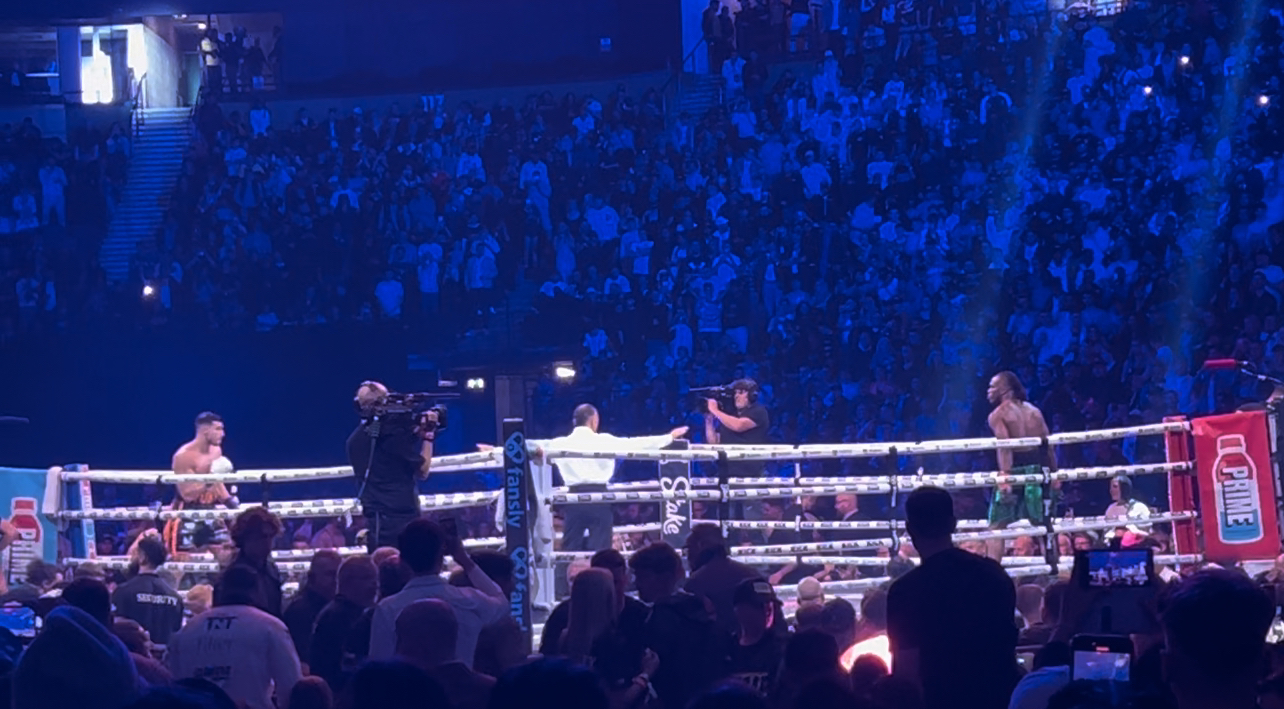
KSI and Fury moments before the start of their bout.

Fury made his ring walk to "Thriller" by Michael Jackson. KSI then walked out to his 2015 single "Lamborghini" while riding in a Lamborghini Gallardo. English rapper Giggs then appeared and performed "Talkin the Hardest." After both men were in the ring, God Save the King was sung.

The 1st round started and both KSI and Fury came out in an orthodox stance. KSI bounced up and down, mimicking the style of Michael 'Venom' Page, and both fighters started to clinch. KSI then hit Fury with a clean overhand right, which made Fury stumble back. In the 2nd round, Fury was deducted a point for continually hitting KSI on the back of his head. In the 3rd round, the referee spoke to KSI and Fury reminding them of the rules. In the 4th round, Fury landed a jab right at the start. The 5th round featured more clinching while Fury began to slow down. In the final round, KSI and Fury indicated more clinching. KSI landed a right hook as Fury attempted to duck.

Fury won the bout via majority decision, scoring 57–56, 57–56, 57–57. After the bout, Irish mixed martial artist Conor McGregor expressed his interest in having a bout with KSI on Twitter.

==== Majority decision controversy ====
During the post fight interview, An enraged KSI lashed out at Fury, and insisted that the result was a "robbery." Many initially agreed with KSI, including English sports promoter Eddie Hearn, who was in attendance.

On 15 October, the results were corrected from majority decision to a unanimous decision victory to Fury due to judge Rafael Ramos, who had previously scored the bout 57–57 on the scorecard, which was mathematically incorrect.

On 20 October, KSI's manager and Misfits Boxing co-president Mams Taylor confirmed on Twitter that KSI instructed a King's Counsel who informed the PBA on 19 October that an appeal will be submitted. Later that day, the PBA confirmed that KSI has formally submitted an appeal over the unanimous decision loss to Fury. On 19 November, the PBA announced that the appeal would take place on 20 November at 10:30am BST onwards. On 1 December, the PBA announced on Twitter that they had rejected the appeal, stating there were "no ground——s" to overturn the result. Despite the result, KSI's manager Mams Taylor stated that the appeal is still ongoing and that they are moving into the second of three possible stages.

== Fight details ==
=== Weight ===
On 30 June 2023, KSI uploaded a video onto his YouTube channel stating that Tommy Fury is demanding the fight takes place at 185 Ibs despite both parties verbally agreeing to 180 Ibs with no rehydration clause and gave Fury a deadline to sign the contract by 3 July at 6:00pm BST. On 1 July, Fury responded with an Instagram story stating that the fight will only take place at 185 Ibs and if KSI doesn't agree, he will rematch Jake Paul in October. KSI then responded on Twitter accepting to fight at 185 Ibs however requested that they weigh in on the morning of the fight. On 3 July, Kalle and Nisse Sauerland, promoters of Misfits Boxing, had confirmed that both parties had agreed on the weight. On 30 July, Misfits Boxing co-owner Mams Taylor confirmed in a Twitter Space that both parties had agreed to 183 Ibs.

=== Sanctioning ===
The British Boxing Board of Control (BBBoC) did not sanction the event, instead the Professional Boxing Association (PBA), who sanctioned all of KSI's previous bouts on Misfits Boxing, was the government body, thus resulting in the event originally being documented as an exhibition with professional ruling. However, on 27 September, KSI vs Fury was listed on BoxRec as a professional bout with the rest of the undercard listed as a "MF–professional" bout.

=== Broadcasting ===
The event was broadcast on pay-per-view on DAZN at £19.99 in the UK and at $54.99 in the US, while in France the event was broadcast on YouTube PPV for €14.99. In the UK and Ireland, the event was also broadcast in cinemas, after it was announced that Unique X had partnered up with DAZN on 6 October. On 12 October, it was announced that the event would also broadcast in the US on ESPN+.

Country/Region	Broadcasters				
Country/Region	Free	Cable TV	PPV	Stream	Cinema
United Kingdom (Host)	YouTube; Kick (Preliminary Card)	Sky Q (Note: Channel 495.)	DAZN PPV		Light Cinemas; Electric Birmingham; Omniplex Cinemas; Ritz Multiplex; Movies @ Parkway Cinemas
Ireland	YouTube; Kick (Preliminary Card)	Sky Q	DAZN PPV		Light Cinemas; Electric Birmingham; Omniplex Cinemas; Ritz Multiplex; Movies @ Parkway Cinemas
United States	YouTube; Kick (Preliminary Card)	—N/a	DAZN PPV; ESPN+		—N/a
Canada	YouTube; Kick (Preliminary Card)	—N/a	DAZN PPV		—N/a
Germany	YouTube; Kick (Preliminary Card)	—N/a	DAZN PPV		—N/a
Austria	YouTube; Kick (Preliminary Card)	—N/a	DAZN PPV		—N/a
Switzerland	YouTube; Kick (Preliminary Card)	—N/a	DAZN PPV		—N/a
Luxembourg	YouTube; Kick (Preliminary Card)	—N/a	DAZN PPV		—N/a
Liechtenstein	YouTube; Kick (Preliminary Card)	—N/a	DAZN PPV		—N/a
Spain	YouTube; Kick (Preliminary Card)	—N/a	DAZN PPV		—N/a
Italy	YouTube; Kick (Preliminary Card)	—N/a	DAZN PPV		—N/a
Japan	YouTube; Kick (Preliminary Card)	—N/a	DAZN PPV		—N/a
Australia	YouTube; Kick (Preliminary Card)	—N/a	DAZN PPV		—N/a
Belgium	YouTube; Kick (Preliminary Card)	—N/a	DAZN PPV		—N/a
Bulgaria	YouTube; Kick (Preliminary Card)	—N/a	DAZN PPV		—N/a
Chile	YouTube; Kick (Preliminary Card)	—N/a	DAZN PPV		—N/a
Czech Republic	YouTube; Kick (Preliminary Card)	—N/a	DAZN PPV		—N/a
Denmark	YouTube; Kick (Preliminary Card)	—N/a	DAZN PPV		—N/a
France	YouTube; Kick (Preliminary Card)	—N/a	YouTube PPV		—N/a
Croatia	YouTube; Kick (Preliminary Card)	—N/a	DAZN PPV		—N/a
Greece	YouTube; Kick (Preliminary Card)	—N/a	DAZN PPV		—N/a
Latvia	YouTube; Kick (Preliminary Card)	—N/a	DAZN PPV		—N/a
Lithuania	YouTube; Kick (Preliminary Card)	—N/a	DAZN PPV		—N/a
Slovakia	YouTube; Kick (Preliminary Card)	—N/a	DAZN PPV		—N/a
Slovenia	YouTube; Kick (Preliminary Card)	—N/a	DAZN PPV		—N/a
Estonia	YouTube; Kick (Preliminary Card)	—N/a	DAZN PPV		—N/a
Hong Kong	YouTube; Kick (Preliminary Card)	—N/a	DAZN PPV		—N/a
Hungary	YouTube; Kick (Preliminary Card)	—N/a	DAZN PPV		—N/a
Indonesia	YouTube; Kick (Preliminary Card)	—N/a	DAZN PPV		—N/a
Middle East (Note: Bahrain, Egypt, Iran, Iraq, Jordan, Kuwait, Lebanon, Oman, Palestine, Syria and Yeman will only require the base DAZN subscription.): Cyprus; Israel; Qatar; Saudi Arabia; United Arab Emirates	YouTube; Kick (Preliminary Card)	—N/a	DAZN PPV		—N/a
India	YouTube; Kick (Preliminary Card)	—N/a	DAZN PPV		—N/a
Korea	YouTube; Kick (Preliminary Card)	—N/a	DAZN PPV		—N/a
Mexico	YouTube; Kick (Preliminary Card)	—N/a	DAZN PPV		—N/a
Malaysia	YouTube; Kick (Preliminary Card)	—N/a	DAZN PPV		—N/a
Norway	YouTube; Kick (Preliminary Card)	—N/a	DAZN PPV		—N/a
New Zealand	YouTube; Kick (Preliminary Card)	—N/a	DAZN PPV		—N/a
Philippines	YouTube; Kick (Preliminary Card)	—N/a	DAZN PPV		—N/a
Romania	YouTube; Kick (Preliminary Card)	—N/a	DAZN PPV		—N/a
Sweden	YouTube; Kick (Preliminary Card)	—N/a	DAZN PPV		—N/a
Singapore	YouTube; Kick (Preliminary Card)	—N/a	DAZN PPV		—N/a
Thailand	YouTube; Kick (Preliminary Card)	—N/a	DAZN PPV		—N/a
Türkiye	YouTube; Kick (Preliminary Card)	—N/a	DAZN PPV		—N/a
Taiwan	YouTube; Kick (Preliminary Card)	—N/a	DAZN PPV		—N/a
Argentina	YouTube; Kick (Preliminary Card)	—N/a	DAZN PPV		—N/a
Iceland	YouTube; Kick (Preliminary Card)	—N/a	DAZN PPV		—N/a
Vietnam	YouTube; Kick (Preliminary Card)	—N/a	DAZN PPV		—N/a
South Africa	YouTube; Kick (Preliminary Card)	—N/a	DAZN PPV		—N/a
Worldwide	YouTube; Kick (Preliminary Card)	—N/a	—N/a	DAZN	—N/a

== See also ==
- Jake Paul vs Tommy Fury
- KSI vs Jake Paul
- 2023 in Misfits Boxing

== Notes ==
Preceded by vs Joe Fournier	KSI's bouts	Succeeded by vs Dillon Danis
Preceded by vs Jake Paul	Tommy Fury's bouts	Succeeded by TBD
Preceded by vs Floyd Mayweather Jr.	Logan Paul's bouts	Succeeded by TBD
Preceded by NA	Dillon Danis' bouts	Succeeded by vs KSI
