= KSI vs Dillon Danis =

Cancelled cruiserweight MF–professional boxing match

Unfinished Business
- Date: 21 March 2025 (cancelled)
- Venue: Manchester Arena, Manchester, England

Tale of the tape
Boxer	KSI	Dillon Danis
Nickname	"The Nightmare"	"El Jefe"
Hometown	Watford, England	Parsippany–Troy Hills, New Jersey, U.S.
Pre-fight record	4–1–0–1 (3 KOs) (Note: On BoxRec, KSI's professional record is 1–1 and his MF–professional record is 3–0–0–1 (3 KOs).)	0–1 (Boxing) (Note: On BoxRec, Danis' professional record is 0–0 and his MF–professional record is 0–1.); 2–0 (MMA)
Age	31 years, 9 months	31 years, 7 months
Height	6 ft 0 in (1.83 m)	6 ft 0 in (1.83 m)
Style	Orthodox	Southpaw
Recognition	Former MFB cruiserweight champion	Former Pan IBJJF Jiu-Jitsu No-Gi champion

Misfits 21 – Unfinished Business was supposed to feature KSI vs Dillon Danis, a cruiserweight MF–professional crossover boxing match between English internet personality KSI and American mixed martial artist Dillon Danis. The event was cancelled on 21 March 2025 after KSI fell ill and a rescheduled date could not be determined.

Originally, KSI was scheduled to face former footballer Wayne Bridge, but the bout was cancelled after Bridge withdrew on 20 January.

== Background ==
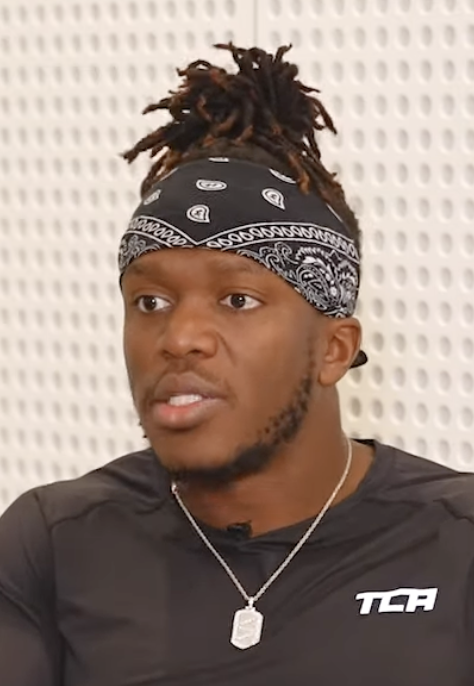
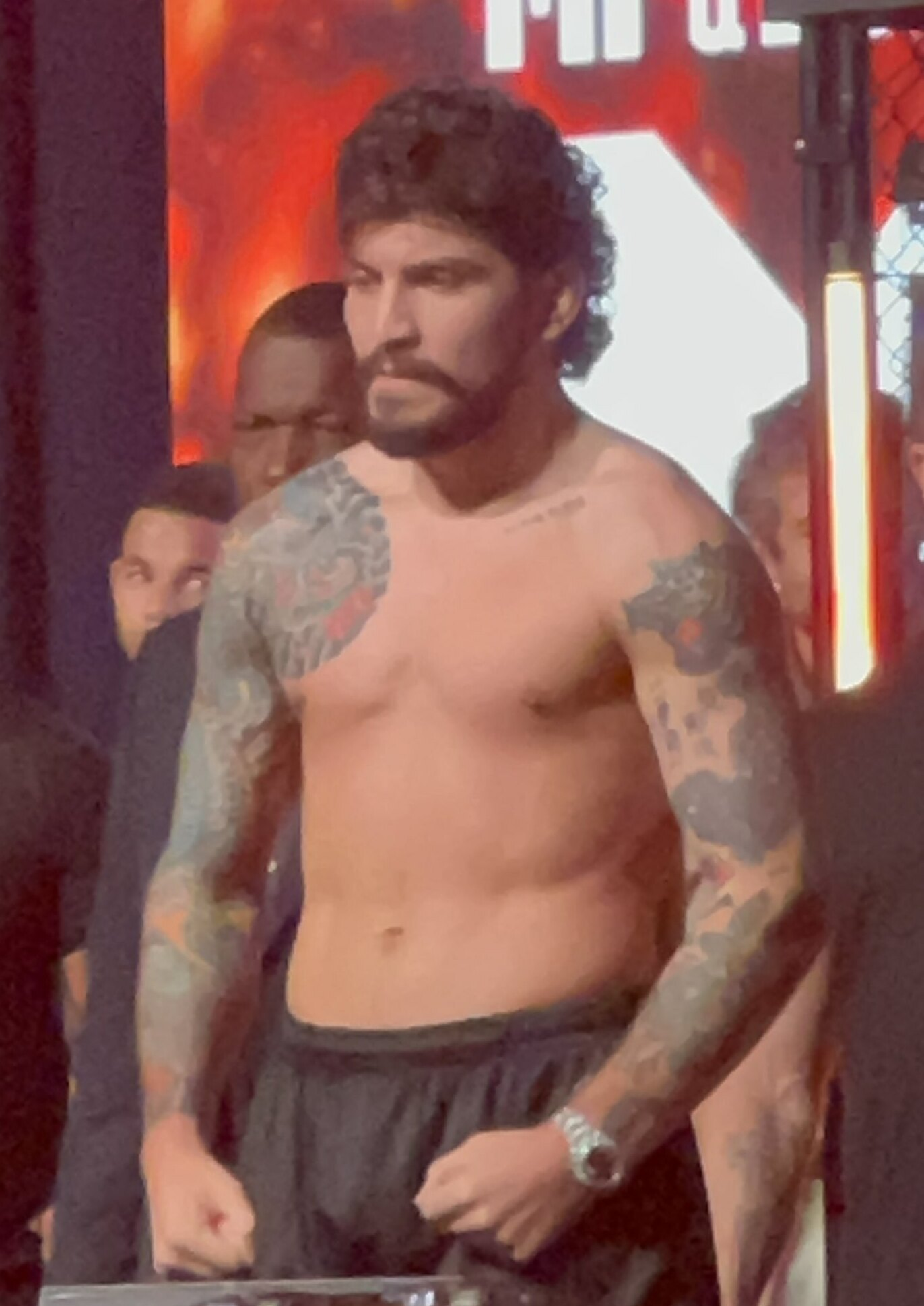
KSI (left) and Dillon Danis (right).

After losing to professional boxer Tommy Fury in October 2023 on X Series 10 – The Prime Card, YouTuber KSI took a break from boxing, but was set to return in August 2024 on X Series 17. Prior to the announcement, KSI was in heavy negotiations to face former unified light welterweight champion Amir Khan. However, in June, it was announced that KSI would face YouTuber Slim Albaher and mixed martial artist Anthony Taylor in a 2 vs 1 outnumbered tag team match. On 1 August however, the bout was cancelled due to an injury sustained from KSI.

During the broadcast of X Series 17, KSI stated he was eyeing to return in early 2025. On 3 January 2025, Misfits Boxing announced that his return would be announced during the broadcast of X Series 20 on 18 January. News broke hours before the announcement that former England and Premier League winning left-back Wayne Bridge is being lined up to face KSI for 29 March. On the night, KSI came into the ring and revealed his original opponent withdrew, leading into a face off with Bridge. The pair got into a brawl after KSI pushed Bridge and brought up John Terry and Bridge's former girlfriend Vanessa Perroncel. However, two days later Bridge withdrew from the bout due to the comments made by KSI about Perroncel.

On 4 February, it was announced that American mixed martial artist Dillon Danis—who KSI was originally scheduled to face at X Series 004—would replace Bridge and headlined Misfits 21 – Unfinished Business at Manchester Arena in Manchester. KSI later revealed in a YouTube video that prior to the announcement of Bridge, KSI's team offered former mixed martial artists Nate Diaz, Donald Cerrone, Tony Ferguson, and Jorge Masvidal the KSI bout, to which all four declined.

On 21 March, Misfits Boxing announced that the event was postponed to due KSI falling ill with a new date set to be revealed the following week. On 4 April, Misfits Boxing co-president Mams Taylor confirmed on X that Misfits 22 – Blinders & Brawls was moved from 12 April to 16 May, and will be their next event, confirming that Misfits 21 – Unfinished Business was no longer happening.

== Fight card ==
Weight class		vs		Method	Round	Time	Notes
Main Card (PPV)
Cruiserweight	KSI	vs.	Dillon Danis		– (6)
Cruiserweight	Darren Till	vs.	Darren Stewart		– (8)		^{Note 1}
Lightweight	Walid Sharks	vs.	FoxTheG		– (4)
Heavyweight	Chase DeMoor (c)	vs.	Roman Fury		– (5)		^{Note 2}
Middleweight	Amir Anderson	vs.	—N/a		– (6)		^{Note 3}
—N/a	Demi Sims	vs	Egypt Criss		—N/a		^{Note 4}
Lightweight	Argentinian King	vs.	Small Spartan Jay		—N/a
Super middleweight	Joe Laws	vs.	Harley Benn		– (6)		^{Note 5}

^Note 1 Stewart's professional debut
^Note 2 For MFB heavyweight title
^Note 3 Professional bout
^Note 4 Sims' professional debut
^Note 5 For inaugural MF pro super middleweight title

== Broadcast ==
The event scheduled to broadcast on pay-per-view on DAZN worldwide.

Country/Region	Broadcasters			
Country/Region	Free	Cable TV	PPV	Stream
United Kingdom (Host)	YouTube; Kick (Misfits Kick-Offs)	—N/a	DAZN PPV; YouTube PPV	
United States	YouTube; Kick (Misfits Kick-Offs)	—N/a	DAZN PPV; YouTube PPV	
Worldwide	YouTube; Kick (Misfits Kick-Offs)	—N/a	DAZN PPV	

== See also ==
- 2025 in Misfits Boxing

Preceded by vs Tommy Fury	KSI's bouts	Succeeded by TBD
Preceded by vs Logan Paul	Dillon Danis' bouts	Succeeded by TBD
