= Exhibition fight =

Non professional contact sports event

Corbett and Courtney Before the Kinetograph, 1894

An exhibition fight is a sports match which is not part of a competition but instead serves the function of demonstrating the skills of the participants. In boxing, an exhibition fight normally consists of three to eight rounds. The participants generally wear larger gloves to minimize punch harm or impact on the combatants, headgear, and non-boxing related clothing. Exhibition fights involve opponents exhibiting their skills while usually being friendly and respectful.

Although there is no specific laws pertaining to exhibition bouts, most bookmakers do not accept bets on exhibition fights whereas others do on a match-by-match basis. Exhibition bouts in boxing are not predetermined, although they may be in other sports. This will generally be made clear from the outset via advertising (such as the Harlem Globetrotters of exhibition basketball) or an open secret (such as professional wrestling) that the exhibition is a performance.

Many exhibition fights involve popular current or former world champions, and exhibition bouts are usually carried out for charity purposes or for the public's entertainment. Exhibition fights are usually not listed as having taken place on boxer's career records. In England, such boxers as Jem Mace, Jimmy Wilde and Tommy Farr boxed both official and exhibition bouts at what were called "boxing booths".

In Russia during the early 1890s, aristocrat Mikhail Kister performed at exhibition boxing fights.

== Early 20th century ==
Early in the 20th century, boxing exhibitions became popular across the United States. Many times, official fights had to be advertised as exhibitions, due to state laws prohibiting professional boxing. As the century progressed, Jack Dempsey, Jack Johnson and others fought exhibition fights. Benny Leonard did an exhibition for the United Drive Rally on May 23, 1923.

== Late 20th century ==
Muhammad Ali last fight exhibition in Tehran, Iran 1993

Exhibition fights became less common as the 20th century progressed. However, a number of notable ones, many including Muhammad Ali, took place. Ali boxed both well known boxers and celebrities from other walks of life during this period, including Michael Dokes, Antonio Inoki, Gorilla Monsoon, Lyle Alzado, Dave Semenko, and the famous Puerto Rican comedian Jose Miguel Agrelot (with Iris Chacon acting as Agrelot's corner-woman).

About six months after Ali beat him for the world Heavyweight title, George Foreman participated in five exhibition fights in one afternoon: on April 26, 1975, he boxed Jerry Judge, Boone Kirkman, Charley Polite, Terry Daniels and Alonzo Johnson at Toronto, Ontario, Canada.

On January 1, 1985, a show including several world champion boxers in exhibition fights was staged in Mexico City, Mexico to garner money for the victims of a 1984 gas explosion in Mexico. Among those who fought were Lupe Pintor, German Torres, Julio César Chávez and Hector Camacho Sr. The latter two would face each other in an actual official fight in September 1992, which Chávez won by unanimous decision.

== 21st century ==
In 2006, Mike Tyson announced he would do a world tour consisting of exhibition bouts. The only one of these fights to actually take place was a bout against his former sparring mate and fellow former professional boxer Corey "T-Rex" Sanders. This fight took place at Youngstown, Ohio.

In 2009, recently retired boxer Óscar De La Hoya and basketball player Shaquille O'Neal held an exhibition boxing fight as an episode of the ABC television show Shaq Vs..

Late in 2014, Julio César Chávez returned to the ring for an exhibition with Vicente Sagrestano in a bout aimed at collecting toys for poor children. He and former rival Mario Martinez, against whom he earned his first world championship in 1984, faced each other again on 3 July 2015, in an event to benefit Chavez's two drug rehabilitation clinics.

On 31 December 2018, boxer Floyd Mayweather Jr. and kickboxer Tenshin Nasukawa faced each other in an exhibition boxing match at Rizin 14 Saitama.

On 28 November 2020, boxers Mike Tyson and Roy Jones Jr. faced each other in an exhibition boxing match resulting in a draw.

On 6 June 2021, boxer Floyd Mayweather Jr. and YouTuber Logan Paul faced each other in an exhibition boxing match.

== See also ==
- Exhibition game
