= 2027 in Misfits Boxing and MF Pro =

MF Sports
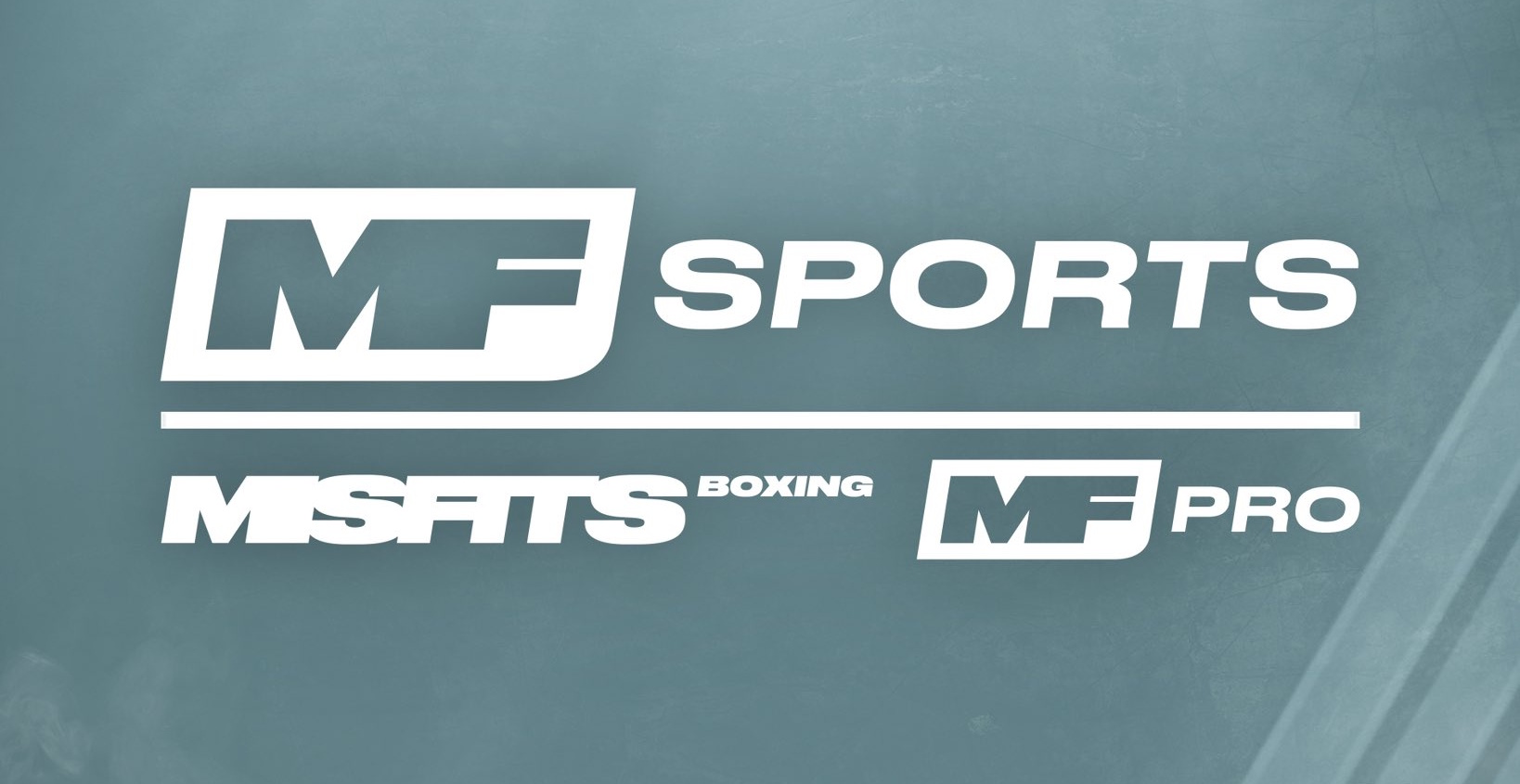

Information
- Promotion: Misfits Boxing; MF Pro
- First date: 5 February 2027
- Website: misfitsboxing.com

2027 in Misfits Boxing and MF Pro is the sixth year in the history of Misfits Boxing and second year in the history for MF Pro, two boxing promotions founded by English YouTuber KSI and run by Mams Taylor, Kalle Sauerland, and Nisse Sauerland.

== Eubank vs. Outlaw ==
Eubank vs. Outlaw
- Date: 5 February 2027
- Venue: Brighton Centre, Brighton, England

Tale of the tape
Boxer	Harlem Eubank	Greg Outlaw
Nickname	"Humble"	"SharpShooter"
Hometown	Brighton, England	Hyattsville, Maryland, US
Pre-fight record	22–2 (9 KOs)	19–2 (11 KOs)
Height	5 ft 8 in (173 cm)	5 ft 11 in (180 cm)
Style	Orthodox	Orthodox

Harlem Eubank vs. Greg Outlaw, is an upcoming welterweight professional boxing match contested between Harlem Eubank and Greg Outlaw. The bout is scheduled to take place on 5 February 2027 at the Brighton Centre in Brighton, England.

=== Background ===
On 14 November 2026 during the Viddal Riley vs. Seydi Coupe broadcast, MF Pro annoucned Eubank would return to the ring agaisnt Greg Outlaw (19–2) in his hometown Brighton.

=== Card ===
Weight class		vs		Method	Round	Time	Notes
Welterweight	Harlem Eubank	vs.	Greg Outlaw		TBA

== See also ==
- 2022 in Misfits Boxing
- 2023 in Misfits Boxing
- 2024 in Misfits Boxing
- 2025 in Misfits Boxing
- 2026 in Misfits Boxing and MF Pro
