= HSTikkyTokky =

English social media personality (born 2001)

Harrison Sullivan
- Born: Harrison James Patrick Sullivan; 6 October 2001 (age 25); Redbridge, London, England
- Occupation: Social media personality
- Years active: 2020–present
- Father: Victor Ubogu

TikTok information
- Page: HSTikkyTokky

Harrison James Patrick Sullivan (born 6 October 2001), known online as HSTikkyTokky, is a British social media personality. He gained prominence on the social media platform TikTok, becoming known for his fitness, crypto and dating content, as well as his views. He is one of the subjects of the 2026 Netflix documentary Louis Theroux: Inside the Manosphere, which followed his activities in Marbella. The documentary drew attention to his deceitful financial advice, inflammatory views on gender and sexuality, and his misogynistic, homophobic and antisemitic rhetoric.

== Early life ==
Harrison James Patrick Sullivan was born on 6 October 2001 to an English mother, Elaine Sullivan and Nigerian father who was a former England rugby player, Victor Ubogu, the latter of whom was largely absent from his life. He was educated at St Mary's Hare Park School, a private Roman Catholic primary school in Romford, Essex. He subsequently attended Becket Keys Church of England School, a free school in Brentwood.

== Career ==
In 2024, the United Kingdom's Financial Conduct Authority listed Sullivan as an unauthorized firm and warned the public not to deal with him.

=== Music ===
Sullivan has released music under the name HSTikkyTokky. His debut single "Hold This", featuring J Fado and produced by DMC Beats, was released on 4 August 2022 and peaked at number 31 on the UK Singles Chart, spending five weeks on the chart.

His second charting single, "Twust", a collaboration with content creator General G (George Elliot), was released on 20 April 2023. The song went viral on TikTok and debuted at number 16 on the UK Singles Chart Update before peaking at number 21 on the Official UK Singles Chart, where it spent three weeks.

== Other ventures ==
=== Boxing ===
On 18 December 2023, Misfits Boxing announced that Sullivan would make his boxing debut against Tayo Ricci as the headliner for MF & DAZN: X Series 12. The bout was scheduled to take place on 20 January 2024 at First Direct Arena in Leeds, England. However, the bout cancelled for unknown reasons though Happy Punch reported that Sullivan was in negotiations for a mega bout in the Spring. On 6 May it was reported that Sullivan was scheduled to fight American rapper The Game, but the fight was cancelled after The Game reportedly withdrew.

==== HSTikkyTokky vs. Fensom ====
On 30 May 2024, Mams Taylor announced that Sullivan's debut would take place on the MF & DAZN: X Series 17 undercard against Love Island contestant George Fensom. The bout took place on 31 August at the 3Arena in Dublin, Ireland where Sullivan won by a technical knockout in the first round. The fight was preceded by a contentious build-up featuring physical altercations during the press conference and weigh-in. Following his victory, Sullivan was involved in a post-fight altercation with a fan in the crowd, during which he threw punches and attempted to throw a chair before being separated by security. Sullivan later explained that the incident occurred after someone challenged him to a fight and swung at him first.

Sullivan was scheduled to fight Mosai Warrior on the MF & DAZN: X Series 19 - Qatar: The Supercard undercard, but the bout was cancelled due to medical issues.

==== Unhinged Promotions ====
In 2026, Sullivan and Ed Matthews started a boxing promotion labelled as Unhinged Promotions. Their inaugural event took place on 25 January 2026 at the Basildon Sports & Leisure Club in Essex, England. In November 2026, Sullivan organised another Unhinged boxing event, in Kilkenny, Ireland, where British far-right activist Tommy Robinson reportedly cited false statistics about Muslim men and sexual offences before a bout involving a Muslim contestant, leading to violent scenes and two arrests.

== Driving offence ==
On 24 March 2024, Sullivan crashed his McLaren 720S on the A30 London Road in Virginia Water. Three people were injured, including his friend George Elliot, known online as "General G", who was in the passenger seat. On 14 October 2024, a warrant was issued for Sullivan's arrest and he left the UK, posting online from Dubai, Doha and Ibiza. He was arrested on 10 October 2025 after a year-long manhunt. Sullivan appeared at Guildford Magistrates' Court on 11 October and pleaded guilty to dangerous driving and driving without insurance, and was given a suspended sentence, disqualified from driving for two years and ordered to undertake 300 hours of unpaid work. He was also sentenced to a three-month curfew and ordered to be electronically monitored, complete an extended driving test after two years and undertake 30 days of rehabilitation.

== Discography ==
=== Singles ===
List of singles, with selected chart positions
Title	Year	Peak chart positions	Album
Title	Year	UK	Album
"Hold This" (with J Fado)	2022	31	Non-album singles
"Twust" (with General G)	2023	21	Non-album singles

== Boxing record ==
1 fight	1 win	0 losses
By knockout	1	0

No.	Result	Record	Opponent	Type	Round, time	Date	Location	Notes
1	Win	1–0	George Fensom	TKO	1 (3), 1:19	31 Aug 2024	3Arena, Dublin, Ireland	
