= 2024 in Misfits Boxing =

Misfits Boxing
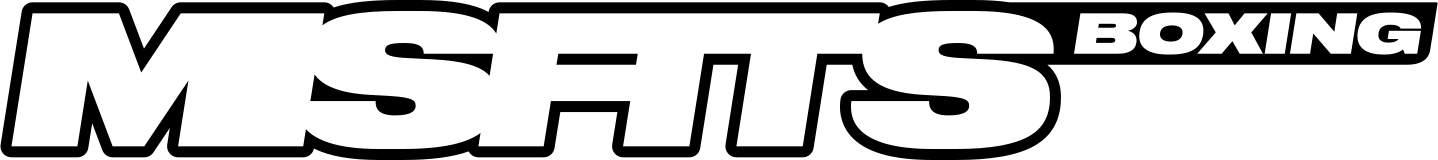

Information
- Promotion: Misfits Boxing
- First date: 20 January 2024
- Last date: 28 November 2024
- Website: misfitsboxing.com

Events
- Total events: 8

Fights
- Total fights: 63

2024 in Misfits Boxing is the third year in the history of Misfits Boxing, a crossover boxing promotion founded by English influencer KSI and run by Mams Taylor, Kalle Sauerland, and Nisse Sauerland. Misfits Boxing held 8 events in 2024.

== MF & DAZN: X Series 12 ==
MF & DAZN: X Series 12
- Date: 20 January 2024
- Venue: First Direct Arena, Leeds, England

Tale of the tape
Boxer	Ed Matthews	Luis Alcaraz Pineda
Nickname		"El Flaco de Oro"
Hometown	Essex, England	Empalme, Sonora, Mexico
Pre-fight record	1–0 (1 KO) (Note: On BoxRec, Matthews' professional record is 0–0 and his MF-professional record is 1–0 (1 KO).)	3–8 (Note: On BoxRec, Pineda's professional record is 2–7 and his MF-professional record is 1–1.)
Height	5 ft 10 in (178 cm)	6 ft 3 in (191 cm)
Weight	156.9 lb (71 kg)	163.6 lb (74 kg)
Style	Orthodox	Orthodox

Result
- Pineda defeated Matthews via round 2 KO.

MF & DAZN: X Series 12 was an MF–professional boxing event which featured Ed Matthews vs Luis Alcaraz Pineda, a middleweight match contested between English TikToker Ed Matthews and Mexican professional boxer Luis Alcaraz Pineda. The event took place on 20 January 2024 at the First Direct Arena in Leeds. Pineda defeated Matthews via knockout in the second round

=== Background ===
On 18 December 2023, Misfits Boxing had announced on social media that their first show in 2024 would be on 20 January 2024 and would headline HSTikkyTokky vs Tayo Ricci. Originally, it was announced that X Series 12 would take place on 4 November 2023 in Austin, Texas, but was delayed for an unknown reason. On 20 December the full undercard was announced on social media. On 5 January however, it was announced that the headliner bout was cancelled and that HSTikkyTokky is in negotiations for a massive bout for Spring. On 10 January, it was announced that English TikToker Ed Matthews would headline X Series 12 against a mystery opponent, which was later revealed as Mexican professional boxer Luis Alcaraz Pineda.

On 12 January, Misfits Boxing president Mams Taylor announced that they have parted ways with the Professional Boxing Association (PBA) the same day that the PBA scheduled a disciplinary hearing for Matthews for 18 January. X Series 12 would mark the first event in the UK to not be under the PBA for Misfits Boxing, and was instead sanctioned by the Polish Professional Boxing Department.

=== Card ===
Weight class		vs		Method	Round	Time	Notes
Main Card
Middleweight	Luis Alcaraz Pineda	def.	Ed Matthews	KO	2/4	1:11	^{Note 1}
Middleweight	Elle Brooke	def.	AJ Bunker (c)	KO	3/5	1:56	^{Note 2}
Light heavyweight	Ashley Rak-Su	vs	OJ Rosé	SD	4
Cruiserweight	Tristan Hamm	def.	Not Logan Paul	KO	1/4	1:39
Lightweight	FoxTheG	def.	Small Spartan Jay	KO	1/4	1:34
Welterweight	Ben Williams	def.	Fes Batista	UD	4
Heavyweight	Chase DeMoor	def.	Malcolm Minikon	UD	4
Preliminary Card
Heavyweight	DTG	def.	Myles Rak-Su	RTD	2/4	3:00
Welterweight	Joey Knight	def.	Most Wanted	TKO	3/4	1:07

^Note 1 Pineda's identity was revealed on fight night and was marketed as a mystery opponent
^Note 2 For MFB women's middleweight title

== MF & DAZN: X Series 13 ==
MF & DAZN: X Series 13
- Date: 23 March 2024
- Venue: Worldwide Stages, Nashville, Tennessee, US

Tale of the tape
Boxer	FoxTheG	Evil Hero
Nickname	"The Big Daddy"	
Hometown	Slough, England	Los Angeles, California, US
Pre-fight record	1–0 (1 KO) (Note: On BoxRec, FoxTheG' professional record is 0–0 and his MF-professional record is 1–0 (1 KO).)	0–2 (Note: On BoxRec, Heros' professional record is 0–1 and his MF-professional record is 0–1.)
Height	5 ft 7 in (170 cm)	5 ft 6 in (168 cm)
Weight	134.6 lb (61 kg)	137 lb (62 kg)
Style	Orthodox	Orthodox

Result
- FoxTheG defeated Hero via round 1 TKO.

MF & DAZN: X Series 13 was an MF–professional boxing event which featured FoxTheG vs. Evil Hero, a lightweight exhibition match contested between English YouTuber FoxTheG and American influencer Evil Hero. The event took place on 23 March 2024 at the Worldwide Stages in Nashville, Tennessee, US. FoxTheG defeated Hero via technical knockout in first round.

Originally, FoxTheG was scheduled to face two opponents in an outnumbered match between Most Evil Tag Team, a tag team consisting of Hero and English Twitter user Most Wanted. The bout was cancelled last minute due to Wanted withdrawing due to an anxiety attack.

=== Background ===
On 16 February, Misfits Boxing announced on social media that X Series 13 would headline FoxTheG vs Most Evil Tag Team, a tag team consisting of Evil Hero and Most Wanted. The MFB lightweight interim tournament will commence on the undercard, starting with two quarter-final bouts between Joey Knight vs Baby Hulk and YuddyGangTV vs Lil Cracra. Originally, it was announced that X Series 13 would take place on 16 December 2023 in Cardiff, Wales, but was delayed for an unknown reason.

The event was supposed to introduce 'outnumbered match' to the sport of boxing. A 2 vs 1 match where one fighter will take on a tag team duo with the rules from the 'tag team boxing' bout that Misfits Boxing head on X Series 005 returning.

==== Evacuation due to bomb threat ====
After the second round of the YuddyGangTV vs Lil Cracra bout, the entire arena was evacuated amid reports of a possible bomb threat. The event resumed after a 78-minute delay. The Spring Hill Police took to social media to confirm that the Tennessee Highway Patrol Bomb Squad were on the scene to investigate. They later determined it was a case of swatting.

YuddyGangTV vs Cracra was determined a no contest after the event resumed.

=== Card ===
Weight class		vs		Method	Round	Time	Notes
Main Card
Lightweight	FoxTheG	def.	Evil Hero	TKO	1/3	0:55	^{Note 1}
Light heavyweight	Chris Avila	def.	Jake Bostwick	SD	4		^{Note 2}
Cruiserweight	Tayler Holder	def.	DWG Earth	TKO	2/5	2:56
Lightweight	YuddyGangTV	vs.	Lil Cracra	NC	2/5	3:00	^{Note 3}^{,}^{4}^{,}^{5}
Lightweight	Joey Knight	def.	Baby Hulk	TKO	1/5	2:22	^{Note 5}
Misfits Kick-Offs
Lightweight	Nikki Hru	def.	Alexia Grace	UD	5		^{Note 6}
Heavyweight	Vitaly Zdorovetskiy	def.	MoDeen	TKO	1/3	2:58	^{Note 7}

^Note 1 Exhibition bout
^Note 2 Professional bout
^Note 3 Professional bout
^Note 4 Cracra's professional debut
^Note 5 MFB lightweight interim title tournament quarter-finals
^Note 6 For vacant MFB women's lightweight title
^Note 7 Exhibition bout

== MF & DAZN: X Series 14 ==
MF & DAZN: X Series 14
- Date: 11 May 2024
- Venue: Troxy, London, England

Tale of the tape
Boxer	Salt Papi	Amadeusz Ferrari
Nickname	"Super"	"The Lord of Hell"
Hometown	Candelaria, Philippines	Warsaw, Poland
Pre-fight record	2–2 (2 KOs) (Note: On BoxRec, Papi's professional record is 0–0 and his MF-professional record is 2–2 (2 KOs).)	1–1 (Boxing); 6–5 (4 KOs) (MMA)
Height	5 ft 8 in (173 cm)	5 ft 10 in (178 cm)
Weight	168 lb (76 kg)	171 lb (78 kg)
Style	Southpaw	Orthodox

Result
- Papi defeated Ferrari via round 3 Corner Retirement.

MF & DAZN: X Series 14 was an MF–professional boxing event which featured Salt Papi vs Amadeusz Ferrari, a light heavyweight match contested between Filipino TikToker Salt Papi and Polish mixed martial artist Amadeusz Ferrari. The event took place on 11 May 2024 at the Troxy in London. Papi defeated Ferrari via corner retirement in the third round.

=== Background ===
On 10 April, Misfits announced on social media that X Series 14 would headline Salt Papi vs Amadeusz Ferrari for 11 May at the Troxy arena in London, England.

=== Card ===
Weight class		vs		Method	Round	Time	Notes
Light heavyweight	Salt Papi	def.	Amadeusz Ferrari	RTD	3/5	3:00
Cruiserweight	Jully Poca (c)	def.	6ar6ie6	UD	5		^{Note 1}
Light heavyweight	King Kenny	def.	Adam Brooks	TKO	2/4	2:29
Cruiserweight	Mist	def.	Ryan Taylor	TKO	1/4	2:32
Lightweight	Argentinian King	def.	Pully Arif	UD	5		^{Note 2}
Heavyweight	Tempo Arts (c)	def.	Ben Knights	TKO	5/5	2:20	^{Note 3}

^Note 1 For MFB women's cruiserweight title
^Note 2 MFB lightweight interim title tournament quarter-finals
^Note 3 For MFB heavyweight title

== MF & DAZN: X Series 15 ==
MF & DAZN: X Series 15
- Date: 25 May 2024
- Venue: NRG Arena, Houston, Texas, US
- Title on the line: MFB women's middleweight championship

Tale of the tape
Boxer	Elle Brooke	Paige VanZant
Nickname		"12 Gauge"
Hometown	Portsmouth, England	Dundee, Oregon, US
Pre-fight record	2–0 (2 KOs) (Note: On BoxRec, Brooke's professional record is 0–0 and her MF-professional record is 2–0 (2 KOs).)	0–0 (Boxing); 8–5 (2 KOs) (MMA)
Height	5 ft 5 in (165 cm)	5 ft 4 in (163 cm)
Weight	124.6 lb (57 kg)	124.6 lb (57 kg)
Style	Orthodox	Orthodox
Recognition	MFB women's middleweight champion	

Result
- Bout ended in a Split Draw. (48–46 Brooke, 46–48 VanZant, 47–47 draw)

MF & DAZN: X Series 15 was a professional boxing event which featured Elle Brooke vs. Paige VanZant, a middleweight match contested English OnlyFans model Elle Brooke and American mixed martial artist Paige VanZant for the MFB women's middleweight title. The event took place 25 May 2024 at the NRG Arena in Houston, Texas, US. The bout ended in a split draw.

=== Background ===
During the Devin Haney vs. Ryan Garcia press conference broadcast on 18 April, DAZN accidentally leaked on the advertisement graphic that X Series 15 would take place on 25 May and would headline Brooke vs. VanZant. The next day, Misfits Boxing announced the event through social media would take place at the NRG Arena in Houston, Texas.

The MFB cruiserweight tournament will commence on the undercard, starting with the opening quarter-final bout between Le'Veon Bell vs Tristan Hamm.

=== Card ===
Weight class		vs		Method	Round	Time	Notes
Main Card
Middleweight	Elle Brooke (c)	vs.	Paige VanZant	SD	5		^{Note 1}^{,}^{2}
Cruiserweight	Le'Veon Bell	def.	Tristan Hamm	UD	5		^{Note 3}^{,}^{4}
Lightweight	YuddyGangTV	def.	Lil Cracra	SD	5		^{Note 5}
Light heavyweight	Anthony Vargas	def.	Jeremy Park	UD	4		^{Note 6}
Lightweight	Killer Bee	def.	Silvia Fernandez	UD	4
Misfits Kick-Offs
Cruiserweight	Alaena Vampira	vs.	Loza	SD	4		^{Note 7}
Cruiserweight	Alysia Magen	def.	Fangs	UD	4		^{Note 8}

^Note 1 Brooke and VanZant's professional debut
^Note 2 For MFB women's middleweight title
^Note 3 Hamm's professional debut
^Note 4 MFB cruiserweight title tournament quarter-finals
^Note 5 MFB lightweight interim title tournament quarter-finals
^Note 6 Park and Vargas' professional debut
^Note 7 Vampira and Loza's professional debut
^Note 8 Magen's professional debut

== MF & DAZN: X Series 16 ==
MF & DAZN: X Series 16
- Date: 10 August 2024
- Venue: James L. Knight Center, Miami, Florida, US

Tale of the tape
Boxer	FaZe Temperrr	Josh Brueckner
Nickname	"The Sniper"	"The Boss"
Hometown	Pitangui, Minas Gerais, Brazil	Detroit, Michigan, US
Pre-fight record	2–2 (2 KOs) (Note: On BoxRec, Temperrr's professional record is 1–0 (1 KOs) and his MF-professional record is 1–2 (1 KO).)	2–1 (1 KO) (Note: On BoxRec, Brueckner's professional record is 2–0 (1 KOs) and his MF-professional record is 0–1.)
Height	6 ft 4 in (1.93 m)	6 ft 1 in (1.85 m)
Weight	187.8 lb (85 kg)	188.4 lb (85 kg)
Style	Southpaw	Orthodox

Result
- Brueckner defeated Temperrr via round 2 TKO.

MF & DAZN: X Series 16 was a professional boxing event which featured FaZe Temperrr vs. Josh Brueckner, a cruiserweight match contested Brazilian YouTuber FaZe Temperrr and American YouTuber Josh Brueckner. The event took place on 10 August 2025 at the James L. Knight Center in Miami, Florida, US. Brueckner defeated Temperrr via technical knockout in the second round.

=== Background ===
On 21 June, Misfits announced on social media that X Series 16 would headline FaZe Temperrr vs. Josh Brueckner for 10 August in Miami, Florida, US. Originally, X Series 16 was scheduled to be headlined by American influencer HSTikkyTokky and American rapper The Game for 22 June, but The Game withdrew.

On the undercard, decorated amateur boxer Amir Anderson made his professional boxing debut.

=== Card ===
Weight class		vs		Method	Round	Time	Notes
Cruiserweight	Josh Brueckner	def.	FaZe Temperrr	TKO	2/5	2:51	^{Note 1}
Light heavyweight	Anthony Taylor (c)	def.	Samuel Ericsson	TKO	2/5	2:52	^{Note 2}^{,} ^{3}
Middleweight	Amir Anderson	def.	Kijonti Davis	TKO	3/6	2:54	^{Note 4}
Lightweight	YuddyGangTV	def.	Argentinian King	UD	5		^{Note 5}^{,} ^{6}
Welterweight	J'Hon Ingram	def.	Ryan Schwartzberg	UD	6
Lightweight	Lil Cracra	def.	Ace Musa	SD	5		^{Note 7}^{,} ^{8}
Middleweight	Leah Gotti	def.	Amber Fields	TKO	3/4	1:34	^{Note 9}

^Note 1 MFB cruiserweight title tournament quarter-finals
^Note 2 MF–Professional bout
^Note 3 For MFB light heavyweight title
^Note 4 Anderson's professional debut
^Note 5 King's professional debut
^Note 6 MFB lightweight interim title tournament semi-finals
^Note 7 Musa's professional debut
^Note 8 MFB lightweight interim title tournament quarter-finals
^Note 9 Exhibition bout

== MF & DAZN: X Series 17 ==
MF & DAZN: X Series 17
- Date: 31 August 2024
- Venue: 3Arena, Dublin, Ireland

Tale of the tape
Boxer	Danny Aarons	Danny Simpson
Nickname		"Simmo"
Hometown	Essex, England	Eccles, England
Pre-fight record	0–0	0–0
Weight	164.9 lb (75 kg)	169.2 lb (77 kg)
Style	Orthodox	Orthodox

Result
- Bout ended in a Split Draw. (38–38 draw, 39–37 Aarons, 39–37 Simpson)

MF & DAZN: X Series 17 was an MF–professional boxing event which featured Danny Aarons vs Danny Simpson, a middleweight exhibition match contested between English YouTuber Danny Aarons and former professional football player Danny Simpson. The event took place on 31 August 2025 at the 3Arena in Dublin, Ireland. The bout ended in a split draw. The number of pay-per-view buys was not disclosed.

Originally, English internet personality KSI was scheduled to return to the ring and face American influencer Slim Albaher and American mixed martial artist Anthony Taylor in an outnumbered tag team match. The bout was cancelled due to an injury KSI sustained and was replaced with a special two-part concert featuring KSI, at the start and end of the main card, with guest experiences by S-X and Trippie Redd.

=== Background ===
On 2 June 2024, KSI confirmed on Twitter his return to ring for August 2024 after a back-and-forth with Jake Paul. Paul then leaked supposedly that KSI's opponent would be former unified light welterweight champion Amir Khan, and offered to fight Khan in February 2025 if he emerged victorious. Khan then responded to Paul seamlessly confirming his next bout against KSI. On 4 June, Khan confirmed he's deep in negotiations to face KSI next.

On 8 June however, KSI uploaded a YouTube confirming the bout with Khan will not happen in August and instead later on in the year. KSI then challenged Slim Albaher and Anthony Taylor to a 2 vs 1 outnumbered tag team match, giving them 24 hours to accept. Within an hour, both Albaher and Taylor accepted on Twitter. On 30 June, the bout was officially announced between KSI, Albaher, and Taylor, along with a launch press conference at the Hilton London Wembley in London, England. However, fans began to speculate if the bout had been cancelled following KSI deleting the bout announcement across his social media. Albaher accused KSI of "ducking" their bout, stating he was the one who withdrew. On 1 August, KSI confirmed his withdrawal in a Twitter post due to an injury sustained.

On 7 August, it was announced that Danny Aarons would face former professional football player Danny Simpson as the new headliner for X Series 17, following Beavo's withdrawal due to injury. Additionally, KSI was announced to perform a special concert in place of his previously scheduled bout.

=== Card ===
Weight class		vs		Method	Round	Time	Notes
Main Card (PPV)
Middleweight	Danny Aarons	vs.	Danny Simpson	SD	4		^{Note 1}
Light heavyweight	Anthony Taylor (c)	def.	Gabriel Silva	TKO	3/5	2:54	^{Note 2}
Heavyweight	HSTikkyTokky	def.	George Fensom	KO	1/3	1:19	^{Note 3}
Welterweight	Ben Williams	def.	Warren Spencer	TKO	2/4	0:45
Lightweight	Deen the Great (c)	def.	Dave Fogarty	TKO	3/5	2:57	^{Note 4}
Welterweight	Sami Hamed	def.	Jesse Clarke	TKO	2/4	2:21
Misfits Kick-Offs
Cruiserweight	Mike Edwards	def.	Jake Cornish	UD	5		^{Note 5}
Cruiserweight	Malcolm Minikon	def.	DTG	MD	5		^{Note 6}

^Note 1 Exhibition bout
^Note 2 For MFB light heavyweight title
^Note 3 Exhibition bout
^Note 4 For MFB lightweight title
^Note 5 MFB cruiserweight title tournament quarter-finals
^Note 6 MFB cruiserweight title tournament quarter-finals

=== Broadcast ===
The event was broadcast on pay-per-view on DAZN worldwide at £19.99 in Ireland and the UK while at $39.99 for the US. The event was broadcast on YouTube in limited languages.

Country/Region	Broadcasters			
Country/Region	Free	Cable TV	PPV	Stream
Ireland (Host)	YouTube; Kick (Misfits Kick-Offs)	—N/a	DAZN PPV; YouTube PPV	
United Kingdom	YouTube; Kick (Misfits Kick-Offs)	—N/a	DAZN PPV; YouTube PPV	
United States	YouTube; Kick (Misfits Kick-Offs)	—N/a	DAZN PPV; YouTube PPV	
Worldwide	YouTube; Kick (Misfits Kick-Offs)	—N/a	DAZN PPV	

== MF & DAZN: X Series 18 – Stake Pro Tournament Card ==
MF & DAZN: X Series 18
- Date: 14 September 2024
- Venue: Vertu Motors Arena, Newcastle upon Tyne, England
- Title on the line: MFB women's middleweight championship

Tale of the tape
Boxer	Elle Brooke	Jenny Savage
Nickname		"The Tennessee Gangster"
Hometown	Portsmouth, England	Clarksville, Tennessee, US
Pre-fight record	2–0–1 (2 KOs) (Note: On BoxRec, Brooke's professional record is 0–0–1 and her MF-professional record is 2–0 (2 KOs).)	0–0 (Boxing); 3–3 (2 KOs) (Bare-knuckle boxing)
Height	5 ft 5 in (165 cm)	5 ft 2 in (157 cm)
Weight	124.7 lb (57 kg)	124.7 lb (57 kg)
Style	Orthodox	Southpaw
Recognition	MFB women's middleweight champion	

Result
- Brooke defeated Savage via Unanimous Decision. (48–47 Brooke, 48–46 Brooke, 48–47 Brooke)

MF & DAZN: X Series 18 – Stake Pro Tournament Card, was an MF–professional boxing event which featured Elle Brooke vs Jenny Savage, a middleweight match contested between English OnlyFans model Elle Brooke and professional bare-knuckle boxer Jenny Savage for the MFB women's middleweight title. The event took place on 14 September 2025 at the Vertu Motors Arena in Newcastle upon Tyne. Brooke defeated Savage via unanimous decision.

=== Background ===
During the broadcast of X Series 16 on 10 August, it was announced that Elle Brooke would face bare-knuckle boxer Jenny Savage as the headliner of X Series 18 in Newcastle upon Tyne, England.

On 20 August, the full undercard was announced including the first Stake Pro Tournament featuring mixed martial artist Chris Avila, former UFC Lightweight Champion Benson Henderson, professional boxer Idris Virgo and influencer Fes Batista. The semifinals and finals matchup will both take place within the same night of the event.

=== Card ===
Weight class		vs		Method	Round	Time	Notes
Main Card
Middleweight	Elle Brooke (c)	def.	Jenny Savage	UD	5		^{Note 1}
Light heavyweight	Idris Virgo	def.	Benson Henderson	UD	5		^{Note 2}^{,}^{3}
Cruiserweight	Jully Poca (c)	def.	Crystal Pittman	UD	5		^{Note 4}
Lightweight	Lil Cracra	def.	Joey Knight	UD	5		^{Note 5}
Catchweight	Lewis Bowden	def.	George Stokey	UD	4		^{Note 6}
Light heavyweight	Ashley Rak-Su	def.	Tristan Hamm	MD	4
Lightweight	Carla Jade	def.	Nikki Hru (c)	UD	5		^{Note 7}
Light heavyweight	Benson Henderson	def.	Chris Avila	UD	5		^{Note 8}
Misfits Kick-Offs
Light heavyweight	Idris Virgo	def.	Fes Batista	TKO	1/5	2:03	^{Note 8}
Heavyweight	Kelz	def.	Big Tobz	TKO	3/3	1:49

^Note 1 For MFB women's middleweight title
^Note 2 Stake pro tournament final
^Note 3 For inaugural MF pro light heavyweight title
^Note 4 For MFB women's cruiserweight title
^Note 5 MFB lightweight interim title tournament semifinals
^Note 6 Exhibition bout
^Note 7 For MFB women's lightweight title
^Note 8 Stake pro tournament semifinals

== MF & DAZN: X Series 19 – Qatar: The Supercard ==
MF & DAZN: X Series 19
- Date: 28 November 2024
- Venue: Lusail Sports Arena, Lusail, Qatar
- Title on the line: MFB middleweight title

Tale of the tape
Boxer	AnEsonGib	Slim Albaher
Nickname	"The 7 Figure Gibber"	"The Hitman"
Hometown	Riyadh, Saudi Arabia	Brooklyn, New York, USA
Pre-fight record	1–1 (1 KO)	4–0 (2 KOs) (Note: On BoxRec, Albaher's professional record is 0–0 and his MF-professional record is 4–0 (2 KOs).)
Height	5 ft 9 in (1.75 m)	6 ft 0 in (1.83 m)
Weight	167.5 lb (76 kg)	166.6 lb (76 kg)
Style	Orthodox	Orthodox
Recognition		MFB middleweight champion

Result
- Gib defeated Albaher via Majority Decision. (76–76 Draw, 78–74 AnEsonGib, 79–73 AnEsonGib)

MF & DAZN: X Series 19 – Qatar: The Supercard was an MF–professional boxing event which featured AnEsonGib vs Slim, a middleweight match contested between Saudi Arabian influencer AnEsonGib and American YouTuber Slim Albaher for the MFB middleweight title. The event took place on 28 November 2024 at the Lusail Sports Arena in Lusail, Qatar. Gib defeated Albaher via majority decision. The number of pay-per-view buys was not disclosed.

=== Background ===
On 3 September 2024, Mams Taylor confirmed on Twitter that Slim Albaher will be facing a "huge name from the mixed martial arts world." On 3 September, Misfits Boxing confirmed that Albaher's opponent will be announced during the broadcast of MF & DAZN: X Series 18 on 14 September. On the night, it was revealed that Albaher's opponent was not an MMA fighter, but instead Saudi Arabian influencer AnEsonGib after years of constant back and forths.

On 14 October, the bout was officially announced to take place on 28 November in Qatar – in association with Visit Qatar – acuminated with a launch press conference in London. The open workout and weigh-ins took place at the Katara Amphitheater on 26 and 27 November.

On the undercard, the bout between professional boxers Amir Anderson and Neeraj Saini became the first professionally sanctioned bout to take place in Qatar – sanctioned by the UAE Boxing Commission.

=== Card ===
Weight class		vs		Method	Round	Time	Notes
Main Card (PPV)
Middleweight	AnEsonGib	def.	Slim Albaher (c)	MD	8		^{Note 1}
Light heavyweight	Salt Papi	def.	King Kenny	TKO	3/6	0:40
Catchweight	Deji Olatunji	def.	Dawood Savage	KO	3/4	0:32	^{Note 2}
Welterweight	Jarvis Khattri (c)	def.	Ben Williams	TKO	3/5	1:16	^{Note 3}
Middleweight	Warren Spencer	def.	NichLmao	MD	4
Lightweight	Lil Cracra	def.	YuddyGangTV	UD	5		^{Note 4}
Heavyweight	Chase DeMoor	def.	Kelz	UD	5		^{Note 5}
Misfits Kick-Offs
Light heavyweight	Luis Alcaraz Pineda	def.	Swarmz	UD	3
Middleweight	Amir Anderson	def.	Neeraj Saini	TKO	2/6	1:30	^{Note 6}

^Note 1 For MFB middleweight title
^Note 2 Exhibition bout
^Note 3 For MFB welterweight title
^Note 4 MFB lightweight interim title tournament final
^Note 5 For vacant MFB heavyweight title
^Note 6 Professional bout

=== Broadcast ===
The event was broadcast on pay-per-view on DAZN worldwide.

Country/Region	Broadcasters			
Country/Region	Free	Cable TV	PPV	Stream
Qatar (Host)	YouTube; Kick (Misfits Kick-Offs)	—N/a	DAZN PPV	
United Kingdom	YouTube; Kick (Misfits Kick-Offs)	—N/a	DAZN PPV	
United States	YouTube; Kick (Misfits Kick-Offs)	—N/a	DAZN PPV	
Worldwide	YouTube; Kick (Misfits Kick-Offs)	—N/a	DAZN PPV	

== Tournament brackets ==
Misfits Boxing are hosting three separate tournaments in 2024. One for the MFB interim lightweight title – while the current MFB lightweight champion Deen the Great heals from injuries – one for the vacant MFB cruiserweight title after KSI vacated the belt in January 2024 and one hosted by Stake featuring four professional fighters all taking place within the same night. As of December 2025, the MFB cruiserweight title tournament has yet to continue.

=== MFB Lightweight Interim Title ===
Quarterfinals
23 March – X Series 13
(United Kingdom) Joey Knight	TKO (1/5)
(United States) Baby Hulk
10 August – X Series 16
(Philippines) Lil Cracra	SD (5/5)
(United Kingdom) Ace Musa
11 May – X Series 14
(Argentina) Argentinian King	UD (5/5)
(United Kingdom) Pully Arif
25 May – X Series 15
(United States) YuddyGangTV	SD (5/5)
(Philippines) Lil Cracra

Semifinals
14 September – X Series 18
(United Kingdom) Joey Knight
(Philippines) Lil Cracra	UD (5/5)
10 August – X Series 16
(United States) YuddyGangTV	UD (5/5)
(Argentina) Argentinian King

Final
28 November – X Series 19
(Philippines) Lil Cracra	UD (5/5)
(United States) YuddyGangTV

=== MFB Cruiserweight Title ===
Quarterfinals
10 August – X Series 16
(Brazil) FaZe Temperrr
(United States) Josh Brueckner	TKO (2/5)
31 August – X Series 17
(United Kingdom) DTG
(United States) Malcolm Minikon	MD (5/5)
25 May – X Series 15
(United States) Le'Veon Bell	UD (5/5)
(Canada) Tristan Hamm
31 August – X Series 17
(United Kingdom) Jake Cornish
(Nigeria) Mike Edwards	UD (5/5)

Semifinals
(United States) Josh Brueckner
(United States) Malcolm Minikon
(United States) Le'Veon Bell
(Nigeria) Mike Edwards

Final

=== Stake Pro Tournament ===
Semifinals
14 September – X Series 18
(United Kingdom) Idris Virgo	TKO (1/5)
(United Kingdom) Fes Batista
14 September – X Series 18
(United States) Chris Avila
(United States) Benson Henderson	UD (5/5)

Finals
14 September – X Series 18
(United Kingdom) Idris Virgo	UD (5/5)
(United States) Benson Henderson

== See also ==
- 2022 in Misfits Boxing
- 2023 in Misfits Boxing
- 2025 in Misfits Boxing
- 2026 in Misfits Boxing
