= Derek Chisora vs. Deontay Wilder =

2026 professional boxing match

An Icon Will Fall
- Date: 4 April 2026
- Venue: The O2 Arena, London, England

Tale of the tape
Boxer	Derek Chisora	Deontay Wilder
Nickname	War	The Bronze Bomber
Hometown	London, England	Tuscaloosa, Alabama, U.S.
Pre-fight record	36–13 (23 KOs)	44–4–1 (43 KOs)
Age	42 years, 3 months	40 years, 5 months
Height	6 ft 2 in (188 cm)	6 ft 7 in (201 cm)
Weight	266.7 lb (121 kg)	226 lb (103 kg)
Style	Orthodox	Orthodox
Recognition	WBC; No. 14 Ranked Heavyweight; IBF; No. 2 Ranked Heavyweight; WBO; No. 6 Ranked Heavyweight	WBC No. 13 Ranked Heavyweight; Former WBC Heavyweight Champion

Result
- Wilder wins via 12–round split decision (115–111, 112–115, 115–113)

Derek Chisora vs. Deontay Wilder, billed as 100 and An Icon Will Fall, was a professional boxing match contested between Derek Chisora, and former heavyweight champion, Deontay Wilder. The bout took place on 4 April 2026 at The O2 Arena, with Wilder winning by split decision.

== Background ==
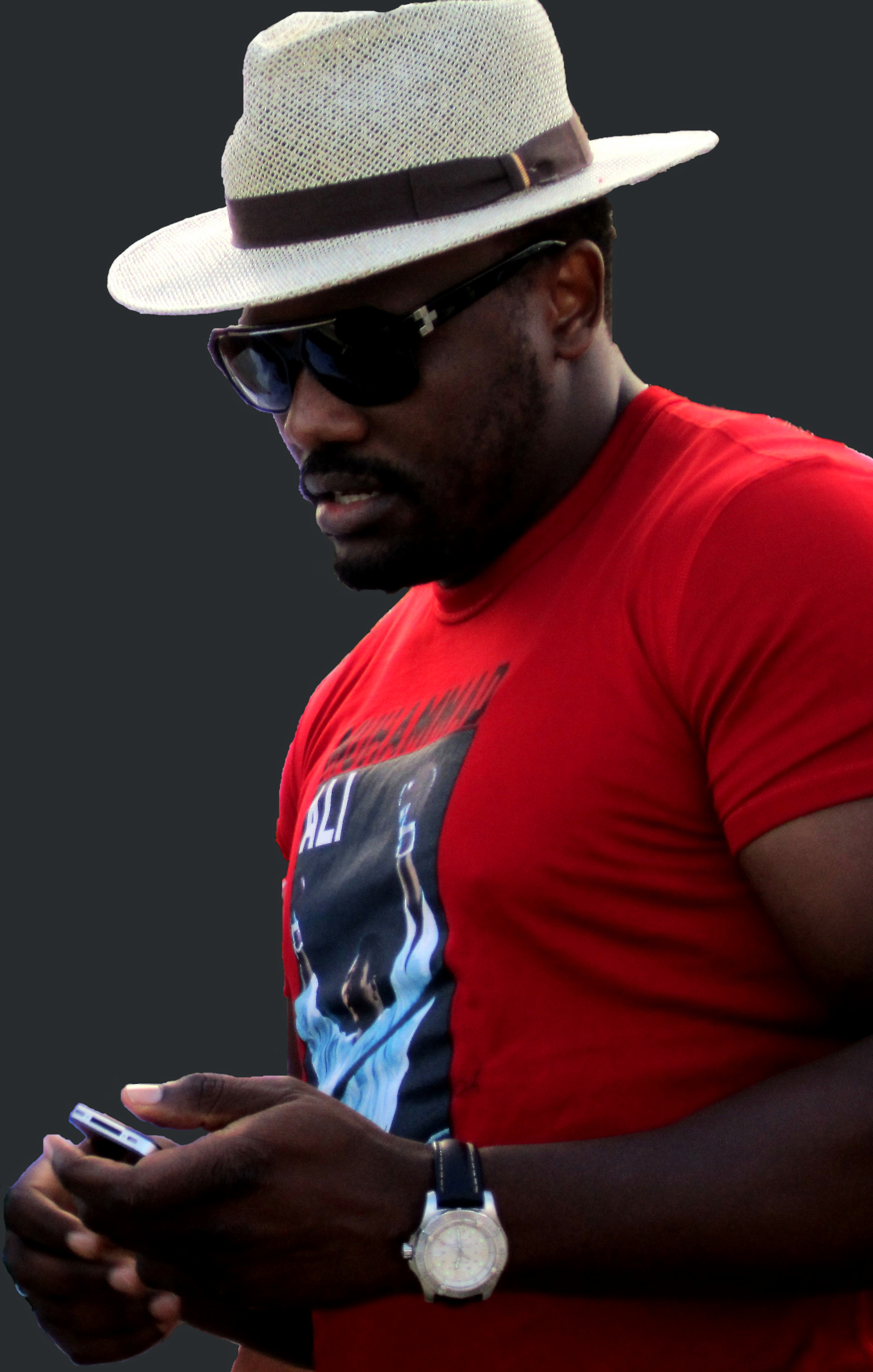
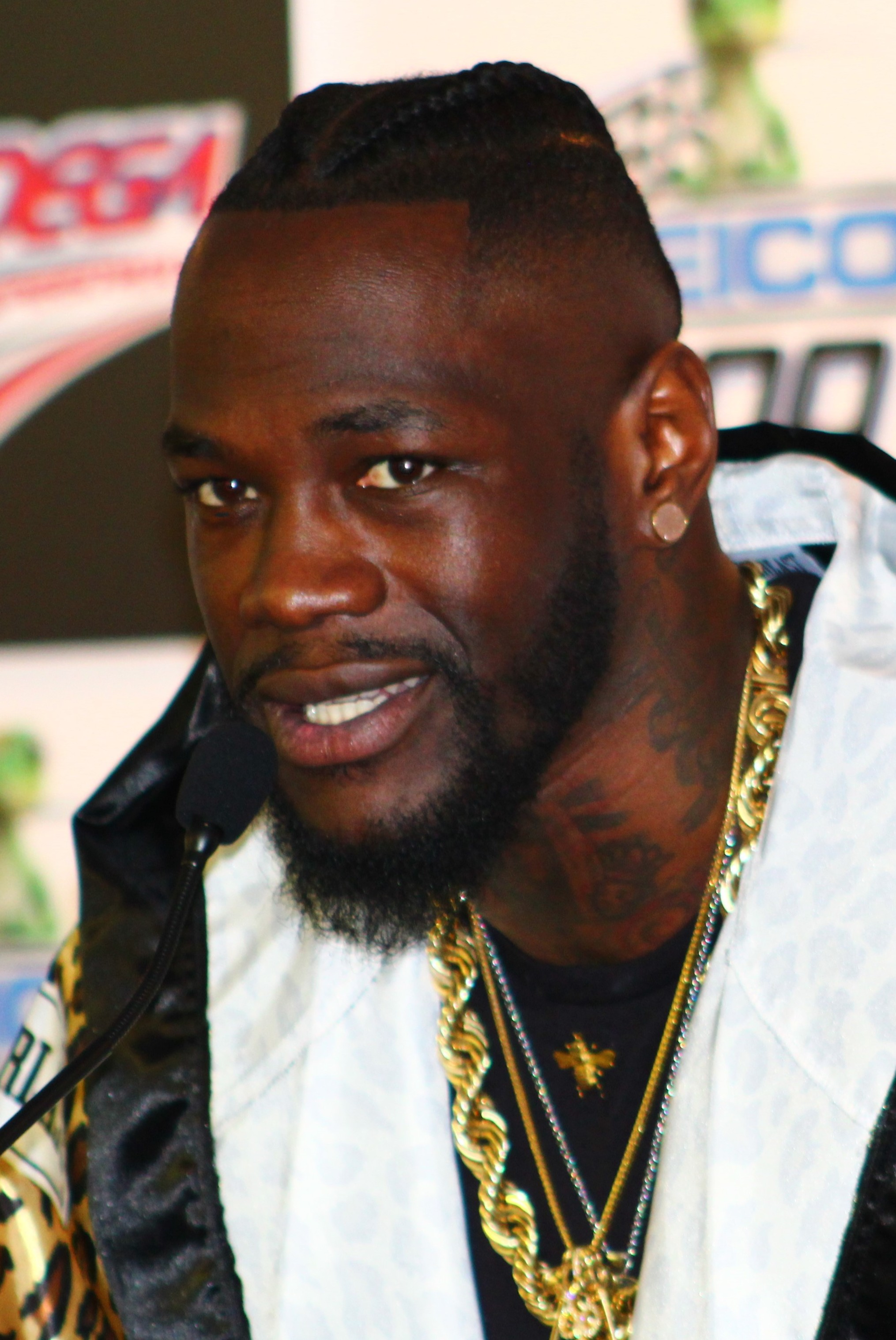
Derek Chisora (left) and Deontay Wilder (right).

On 9 May 2013, Frank Warren announced a fight between Derek Chisora and Deontay Wilder on 15 June at the Wembley Arena in London, live on BoxNation. However, Wilder's then-promotional outfit, Golden Boy Promotions, confirmed that the fight had not been finalised due to legal issues.

In December 2025, former WBC heavyweight champion Wilder confirmed that he and unified heavyweight champion Oleksandr Usyk were in negotiations to face off in Summer 2026. However, on 21 January 2026, reports stated that Wilder was nearing a deal to face Chisora in April in London as a tune-up fight before facing Usyk. The following day, reports stated that the bout was scheduled for 4 April at The O2 Arena, with Viddal Riley set to feature as the co-feature bout. The event would mark as the inaugural event under Misfits Boxing's new sub division dubbed MF Pro, a professional boxing division promoted by KSI and Kalle & Nisse Sauerland. Despite these reports, Warren claimed that Chisora was still under contract with Queensberry Promotions. On 30 January, the bout was officially announced in partnership with Queensberry Promotions livestreamed on DAZN.

Wilder appointed Don House as his head trainer, replacing Malik Scott. Wilder and Scott remained on good terms. Wilder described Scott as a crucial support during a difficult phase, calling him a “brother” and crediting him for mental rebuilding. House was known for training over 28 champions across boxing and UFC and took over head trainer duties for Wilder's last fight in June 2025.

During fight week, Chisora was made a 1/2 favourite by Sky Bet and Wilder was a 13/8 underdog.

== Fight details ==
Wilder won by a controversial split decision with scores of 115–111, 115–113 in his favour, and 115–112 in favour of Chisora. Compubox showed that Chisora landed 143 of his 385 punches thrown (37%) and Wilder landed 125 of his 341 thrown (37%). Chisora did have the edge on power punches, landing 105 compared to 99 from Wilder.

== Aftermath ==
Following Wilder's win, in the post-fight interview, Wilder said "Derek, he's a warrior. He came like a lion to fight, but like I said before, I don't play boxing, I come to end it" and "I had had to heal. You know, it took a long time for me to heal, but I'm back, and I'm going to get better and better each and every time". Chisora felt as though he won the fight, saying "I came out the ropes, I don't know why. I'm just upset that I come out the ropes, because if I didn't come out the ropes, I'd have won that fight. You know, he pushed me out the ropes once and the second one I just came out for some reason". Chisora was presented with an honorary belt from Five Guys in commemoration of his post-fight ritual of presenting fast food to his opponents.

== Fight card ==
Weight class		vs		Method	Round	Time	Notes
Main Card (DAZN PPV)
Heavyweight	Deontay Wilder	def.	Derek Chisora	SD	12
Cruiserweight	Viddal Riley	def.	Mateusz Masternak (c)	UD	12		^{Note 1}
Middleweight	Denzel Bentley	def.	Endry Saavedra	TKO	7/12	1:38	^{Note 2}
Heavyweight	Matty Harris	def.	Franklin Ignatius	KO	2/8	0:20
Middleweight	Amir Anderson	def.	Jordan Dujon	TKO	8/8	2:19
Preliminary Card (DAZN and YouTube)
Super lightweight	Ashton Sylve	def.	Raul Antonio Galaviz Hernandez	UD	8
Super featherweight	Jermaine Dhliwayo	def.	Jake Morgan	TKO	7/8	1:04
Super welterweight	Dan Toward	def.	Misael Da Veiga	TKO	3/6	1:41
Featherweight	Tom Welland	def.	Yahir Alexander Solorio Morales	PTS	4

^Note 1 For European cruiserweight title and IBF world title eliminator
^Note 2 For WBO interim middleweight title

== Broadcasting ==
Originally, reports stated that the event will be broadcast by Sky Box Office as a return to British boxing. However, on 30 January it was announced that DAZN had acquired the streaming rights.

Country/Region	Broadcasters			
Country/Region	Free	Cable TV	PPV	Stream
United Kingdom	YouTube (Preliminary Card)	—N/a	DAZN PPV	
United States	YouTube (Preliminary Card)	—N/a	DAZN PPV	
Worldwide	YouTube (Preliminary Card)	—N/a	DAZN PPV	

Preceded by vs. Otto Wallin	Derek Chisora's bouts 4 April 2026	Retired
Preceded by vs. Tyrrell Anthony Herndon	Deontay Wilder's bouts 4 April 2026	Succeeded by TBA
