= Misfits Boxing =

English sports promotional company

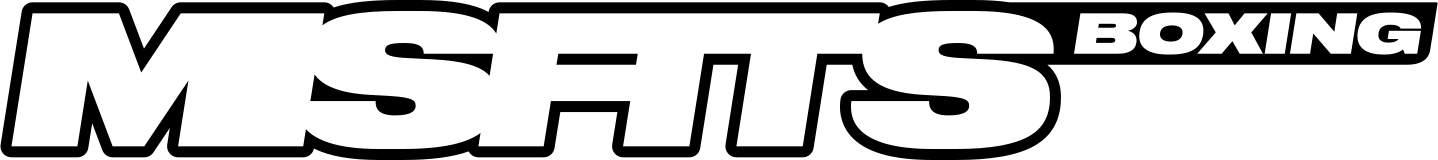
- Type: Division
- Industry: Sports promotion
- Founded: May 2022; 4 years ago
- Founders: Olajide "KSI" Olatunji; Mams Taylor; Kalle Sauerland; Nisse Sauerland
- Headquarters: London, England
- Key people: Olajide "KSI" Olatunji (CEO); Mams Taylor (Co-president); Kalle Sauerland (Co-president)
- Owner: MF Sports (25%)
- Website: misfitsinc.shop

Misfits Boxing (MFB) or simply Misfits, is a sports promotion company based in London, England. The promotion was founded in 2022 by English internet personality KSI alongside Mams Taylor, Kalle Sauerland, and Nisse Sauerland.

== History ==
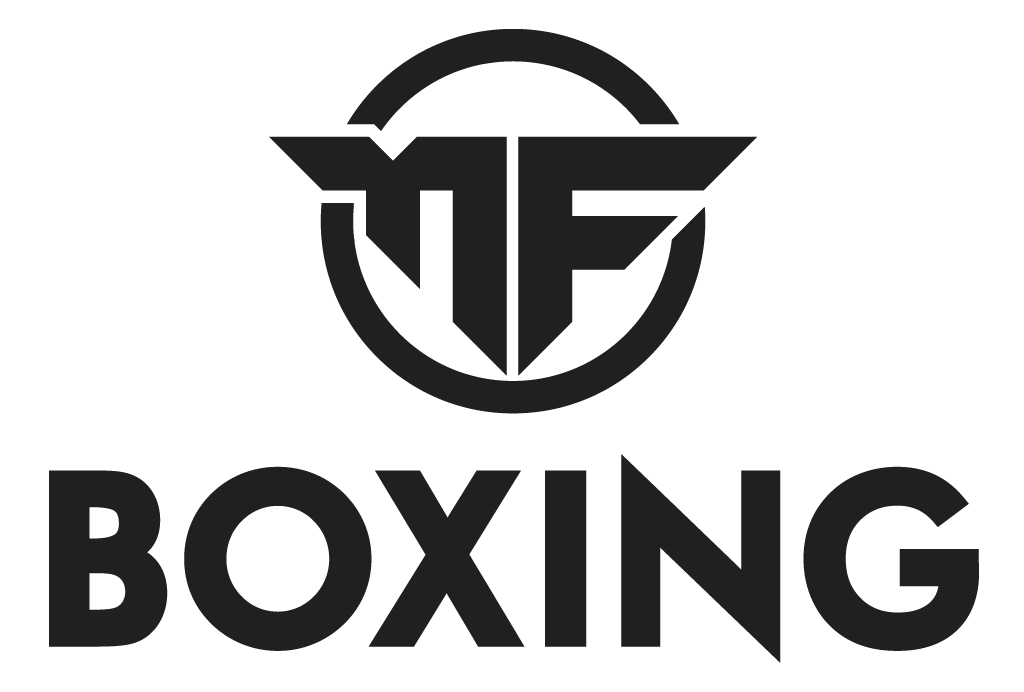
Original logo used from 2022 to 2024.

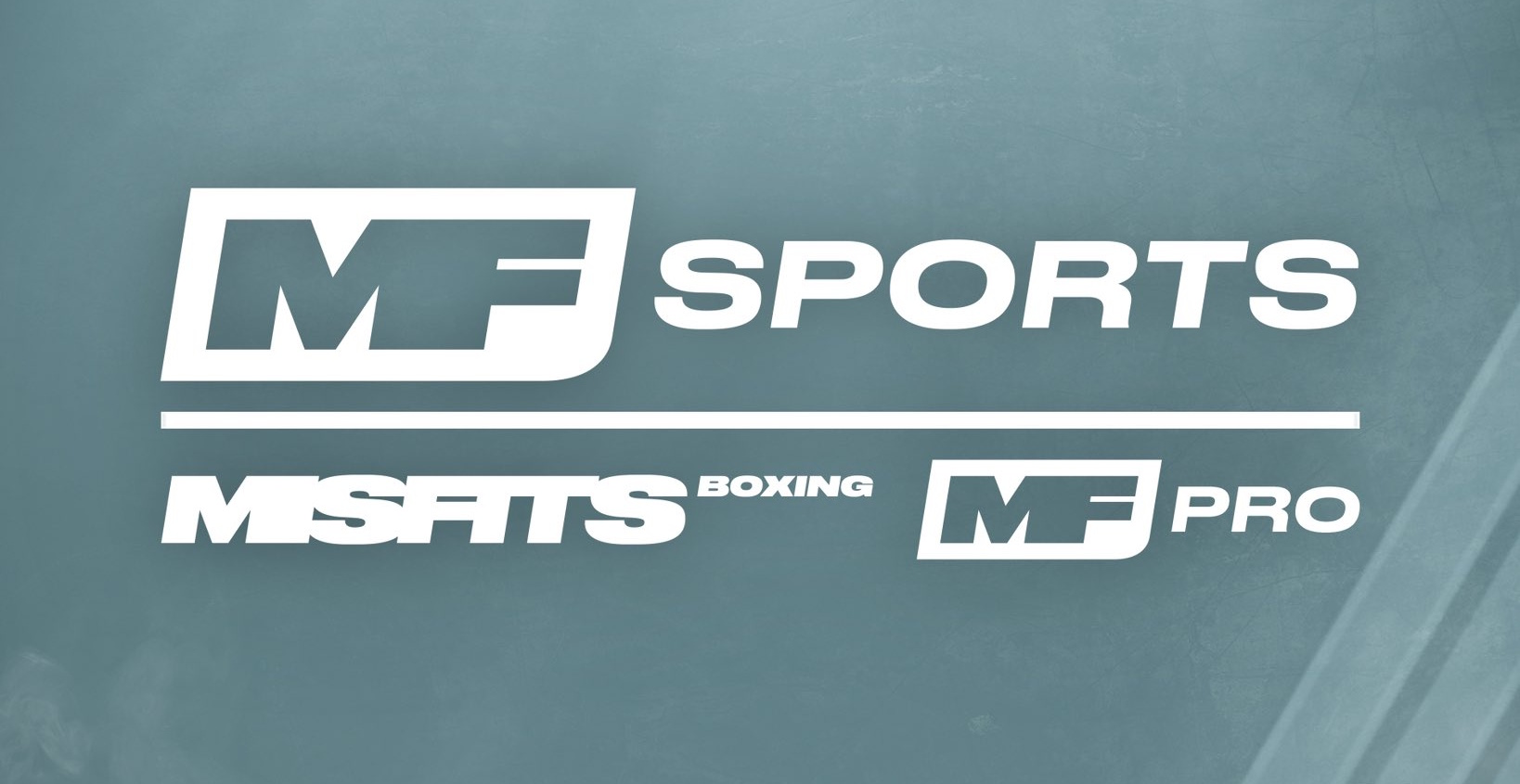
MF Sports, the parent company to MF Pro and partial owner of Misfits Boxing.

In June 2021, English internet personality KSI announced that he, Wasserman Boxing, and Proper Loud, had partnered to launch a new boxing promotion aimed at staging the world's largest celebrity boxing matches. Wasserman Boxing, led by Misfits Boxing co-owners Kalle and Nisse Sauerland, handles the technical and logistical operations of Misfits events, including contracts, broadcast relationships, transportation, and incorporation.

On 5 May 2022, KSI revealed that the company was named Misfits Boxing and confirmed that the first event will take place on 27 August. On 1 July 2022, DAZN accidentally leaked the launch of "MF & DAZN: X Series," a series of events focused on the crossover boxing phenomenon in partnership with Misfits.

On 15 July 2022, Misfits' first event, MF & DAZN: X Series 001, was officially unveiled to take place on 27 August at The O2 Arena and a four-event deal was signed with DAZN. In November, Misfits were involved with the promotion for Floyd Mayweather Jr. vs Deji in English-speaking markets by having the event listed under the "X Series" banner and livestreaming the press conference on their YouTube channel. This was a part of the DAZN deal. On 10 January 2023, Misfits and DAZN signed a 5-year exclusivity deal to continue to distribute events with two pay-per-view each year.

On 4 March 2023 at MF & DAZN: X Series 005, Misfits introduced 'tag team boxing' to the sport of boxing. The rules stated that a boxer can tag-in their teammate once they get to their corner, scorecards are calculated based on the performance of the boxers in the ring as though both team members are one person and if an opponent gets knockout, then the opposing team will be crowned the winner. On 22 July 2023 at MF & DAZN: X Series 008, 'survivor tag boxing' was introduced to the sport of boxing. The rules state that a boxer can tag-in any of the boxers that are currently stationed at their respected corner, but cannot, however, tag the boxer who had previously tagged out. If a boxer refuses to tag-in, they will be immediately eliminated. If a boxer were to be knocked out or knocked down, then they too will be eliminated. The last boxer standing will be crowned the winner.

On 14 October 2023, Misfits held its tenth event, MF & DAZN: X Series 10 – The Prime Card, which saw KSI face off against professional boxer Tommy Fury. The event reportedly achieved 1,300,000 pay-per-view sales, making it the most successful combat sports event of 2023. Despite reports, Dana White suggested that these numbers were nowhere near accurate.

On 10 October 2024, Misfits unveiled its rebranding with a new logo and the introduction of championship rings. If an in-house champion successfully defends their title five times they would be awarded a diamond encrusted gold legacy ring and with ten successful defends a diamond ruby platinum ring will be awarded.

In August 2025, reports stated that Misfits was closing a deal with British former kickboxing and influencer Andrew Tate to compete in a heavyweight bout by the end of the year. However, BBC Sport contacted DAZN and were informed that Tate was not in negotiations with Misfits. On 15 October, it was reported that Tate was set to debut against in house heavyweight champion Chase DeMoor in December. On 30 October, Tate vs DeMoor was officially announced, which featured a promotional video claiming that Tate had replaced KSI as the CEO of Misfits. That event marks the first event to not be broadcast by DAZN, despite their 5-year exclusivity deal. Marked as a "one-off," the event is set to be broadcast via Rumble instead.

In November 2025, Wasserman confirmed it was in talks to sell its boxing promotion division, Wasserman Boxing. As part of the sale, Wasserman's 25% stake in Misfits Boxing would also be included. In February 2026, it was announced that Wasserman as a whole entity would be up for sale. On March 18, Kalle and Nisse Sauerland confirmed the sale, and rebranded Wasserman Boxing into MF Sports. MF Sports will remain a large shareholder of Misfits Boxing, and wholly-owned shareholder of MF Pro.

In June 2026, Misfits and German sports promotion Fame Fighting held a joint event in Germany in which both promoters presented fighters to represent the organization against each other. The event was broadcast via Bild+ in Germany, Austria, and Switzerland and via The Sun Club internationally. Later that month, Misfits announced the signing of Campbell Hatton, son of former world champion Ricky Hatton.

In October 2026, Misfits reintroduced KSI as the CEO of Misfits and announced MF Foundations, a non-profit charity organization aimed at giving back to the community. Along the reintroduction, KSI announced that Michael 'Venom' Page had signed with MF Sports.

== MF Pro ==
MF Pro
- Type: Division
- Industry: Sports promotion
- Founded: June 2024; 2 years ago
- Founders: Olajide "KSI" Olatunji; Mams Taylor; Kalle Sauerland; Nisse Sauerland
- Headquarters: London, England
- Key people: Olajide "KSI" Olatunji (Co-founder); Kalle Sauerland (Co-president); Amer Abdallah (Co-president); Mams Taylor (Promoter)
- Parent: MF Sports

In June 2024, Misfits Boxing launched a professional boxing promotion, named "MF Pro", with the signing of decorated amateur boxer and ten times national champion Amir Anderson. Anderson went on to make his professional boxing debut on MF & DAZN: X Series 16 and became the first boxer to have sanctioned bout take place in Qatar on MF & DAZN: X Series 19 – Qatar: The Supercard. On 8 August, J'Hon Ingram (4–0) was the second signee announced. On 17 October, Misfits Boxing announced the signing of WBC Silver super bantamweight champion Dylan Price (19–0). On 30 December, Ty Mitchell (3–2) announced he had signed a multi-year deal with MF Pro and made his debut on MF & DAZN: X Series 20 after a 14-year hiatus from professional boxing.

On 10 January 2025, Mexican eighteen time national champion Kayla Gomez was signed and was originally set to make her professional debut in March. On 22 February, Misfits announced the singing of Brazilian heavyweight 2020 Tokyo Olympic bronze medallist Abner Teixeira. On 5 October, Misfits signed David Lopez (7–0). On 19 October, Misfits announced that Ashton Sylve (11–1) was the latest signee. Sylve was originally signed under Jake Paul's promotion Most Valuable Promotions, but was dropped following his defeat to Lucas Bahdi.

On 6 December 2025, British cruiserweight champion and KSI's former trainer Viddal Riley (13–0) announced that he has signed with MF Pro following his departure from Boxxer. Riley explained in an interview with Sky Sports that Misfits will soon begin to produce separate MF Pro events that are comparable with the other traditional boxing promotions. Alongside Riley's announcement, MF Pro Boxing launched its social media pages with a promotional video that revealed Amer Abdallah had been appointed president of the division.

In 2026, MF Pro began to produce their own events outside the traditional Misfits scene. On 30 January, MF Pro announced a heavyweight bout headlining Derek Chisora vs. Deontay Wilder for 4 April in partnership with Queensberry Promotions. Their inaugural event was announced on 6 February headlining Mick Conlan vs. Kevin Walsh for 20 March. Later that month, MF Pro also announced a long-term deal broadcast with DAZN. On March 18, Kalle and Nisse Sauerland announced that MF Pro will be a separate entity from Misfits Boxing, operated under the parent company MF Sports, as a sister promotion to Misfits Boxing. On 11 March 2026, Jeff Mayweather's The Mayweather Channel got rebranded into MF Pro on YouTube due to Mayweather's affiliation with MF Pro's president Amer Abdallah, which had 503,000 subscribers at the time. Mayweather created a new YouTube channel under the same name.

=== Current stable ===
Records correct as of 20 November 2026, after Amari Jones vs. DeAundre Pettus.

Boxer	Weight	Record	Title	Ref.
(United States) Amir Anderson	Middleweight	9–0 (8 KOs)	MF Pro and WBC US Silver middleweight	
(United Kingdom) Zelfa Barrett	Super featherweight	36–3 (19 KOs)	WBA International lightweight	
(United Kingdom) Niall Brown	Super middleweight	18–0 (7 KOs)	—N/a	
(United Kingdom) Derek Chisora	Heavyweight	36–14 (23 KOs)	—N/a	
(Republic of Ireland) Mick Conlan	Featherweight	20–4 (10 KOs)	—N/a	
(United States) Devin Cushing	Super lightweight	19–0 (14 KOs)	—N/a	
(United Kingdom) Charlie Edwards	Flyweight	20–3 (7 KOs; 1 NC)	—N/a	
(United Kingdom) Harlem Eubank	Welterweight	22–2 (9 KOs)	—N/a	
(United States) Kayla Gomez	Bantamweight	1–0	—N/a	
(United Kingdom) Matty Harris	Heavyweight	11–1 (7 KOs)	—N/a	
(United States) J'Hon Ingram	Lightweight	9–1 (7 KOs)	—N/a	
(United Kingdom) Josh Kelly	Light middleweight	19–1–1 (9 KOs)	IBF light middleweight	
(United States) David Lopez	Welterweight	10–0 (8 KOs)	MF Pro welterweight	
(United Kingdom) Ben Marskby	Super lightweight	15–0 (3 KOs)	WBO European and Commonwealth super lightweight	
(United Kingdom) Ty Mitchell	Super middleweight	8–2 (5 KOs) (Note: Mitchell's professional record is 6–2 (3 KOs) while his MF–professional record is 2–0 (1 KO).)	MF Pro light heavyweight and super middleweight	
(Republic of Ireland) Kieran Molloy	Welterweight	15–0 (8 KOs)	IBF European welterweight	
(United Kingdom) Viddal Riley	Cruiserweight	15–0 (7 KOs)	European cruiserweight	
(United Kingdom) Codie Smith	Super featherweight	10–0–1 (1 KOs)	—N/a	
(United States) Ethan Smith	Super middleweight	5–0 (4 KOs)	—N/a	
(United States) Ashton Sylve	Lightweight	14–1 (10 KOs)	—N/a	
(United Kingdom) Frankie Stringer	Lightweight	12–0 (1 KO)	—N/a	
(Brazil) Abner Teixeira	Heavyweight	1–0 (1 KOs)	—N/a	
(United Kingdom) Dan Toward	Super welterweight	9–1–1 (6 KOs)	WBA Contiental super welterweight	
(United Kingdom) Cameron Vuong	Lightweight	9–0–1 (4 KOs)	—N/a	
(United Kingdom) Tom Welland	Featherweight	12–1 (6 KOs)	English featherweight	
(United States) Deontay Wilder	Heavyweight	45–4–1 (43 KOs)	—N/a	
(United States) DJ Zamora	Super featherweight	18–0 (12 KOs)	—N/a	

=== Former talent ===
Boxer	Weight	Record	Title	Ref.
(United States) Dylan Price	Bantamweight	21–1 (15 KOs)	—N/a	

== Mixed martial arts ==
On 30 August 2025, Misfits Boxing launched their professional mixed martial arts division with the inaugural bout between notorious figure Dillon Danis and influencer Warren Spencer. The MMA bout took place in a ring, oppose to the modern octagon cage, on the Misfits 22 – Ring of Thrones undercard. The second MF MMA fight was scheduled to take place at Misfits Mania on 20 December 2025 between Dillon Danis and Anthony Taylor, but cancelled because Danis was deemed not medically cleared to compete following the large brawl involving Islam Makhachev's team at UFC 322.

On 10 October 2026, KSI announced that Michael 'Venom' Page had signed a multi-year deal with MF Sports.

== In-house champions ==
Since its inception, Misfits have awarded various fighters with the "MFB" world title. The first iteration was awarded to KSI for defeating Luis Alcaraz Pineda to become the inaugural cruiserweight champion. In December 2022, Misfits announced that the ICB (Influencer Championship Belt) will no longer be sanctioning title bouts, opting to use their promotion's belts exclusively.

In 2024, Misfits heled multiple tournaments to award their titles. One was for the interim lightweight title, as the champion at the time was injured, one for the cruiserweight title after KSI vacated the belt in January 2024, and one hosted by Stake featuring four professional fighters all taking place within the same night for the first "MF Pro" title. In an interview with Fred Talks Fighting on 15 September 2026, Mams Taylor confirmed that the MFB cruiserweight title tournament would not be continuing.

== List of events ==
=== Misfits Boxing ===
No.	Event	Headline	Date	Location	Ref
1	MF & DAZN: X Series 001	KSI vs. Luis Alcaraz Pineda	27 August 2022	The O2 Arena, London, England	
2	MF & DAZN: X Series 002	Jay Swingler vs. Cherdleys	15 October 2022	Sheffield Arena, Sheffield, England	
3	MF & DAZN: X Series 003	Deen the Great vs. Walid Sharks	19 November 2022	Moody Center, Austin, Texas, US	
4	MF & DAZN: X Series 004	KSI vs. FaZe Temperrr	14 January 2023	Wembley Arena, London, England	
5	MF & DAZN: X Series 005	Jay Swingler vs. NichLmao	4 March 2023 (Note: Originally scheduled for 25 February 2023 in Milton Keynes but was postponed and moved to Telford due to clashes with Jake Paul vs Tommy Fury on the same date.)	Telford International Centre, Telford, England	
6	MF & DAZN: X Series 006	JMX vs. Le'Veon Bell	21 April 2023	XULA Convocation Centre, New Orleans, Louisiana, US	
7	MF & DAZN: X Series 007	KSI vs. Joe Fournier	13 May 2023	Wembley Arena, London, England	
8	MF & DAZN: X Series 008	NichLmao vs. Swarmz vs. BDave vs. Ryan Johnston	22 July 2023	Nashville Municipal Auditorium, Nashville, Tennessee, US	
9	MF & DAZN: X Series 009	Idris Virgo vs. Aaron Chalmers	23 September 2023	Vertu Motors Arena, Newcastle upon Tyne, England	
10	MF & DAZN: X Series 10 – The Prime Card	KSI vs. Tommy Fury (Note: The event was marketed as a double main event, with Logan Paul vs Dillon Danis acting as the second feature.)	14 October 2023	Manchester Arena, Manchester, England	
11	MF & DAZN: X Series 11	Jarvis Khartti vs. BDave	17 November 2023	York Hall, London, England	
12	MF & DAZN: X Series 12	Ed Matthews vs. Luis Alcaraz Pineda	20 January 2024	First Direct Arena, Leeds, England	
13	MF & DAZN: X Series 13	FoxTheG vs. Evil Hero	23 March 2024	Worldwide Stages, Nashville, Tennessee, US	
14	MF & DAZN: X Series 14	Salt Papi vs. Amadeusz Ferrari	11 May 2024	Troxy, London, England	
15	MF & DAZN: X Series 15	Elle Brooke vs. Paige VanZant	25 May 2024	NRG Arena, Houston, Texas, US	
16	MF & DAZN: X Series 16	FaZe Temperrr vs. Josh Brueckner	10 August 2024	James L. Knight Center, Miami, Florida, US	
17	MF & DAZN: X Series 17	Danny Aarons vs. Danny Simpson	31 August 2024	3Arena, Dublin, Ireland	
18	MF & DAZN: X Series 18 – Stake Pro Tournament Card	Elle Brooke vs. Jenny Savage	14 September 2024	Vertu Motors Arena, Newcastle upon Tyne, England	
19	MF & DAZN: X Series 19 – Qatar: The Supercard	AnEsonGib vs. Slim Albaher	27 November 2024	Lusail Sports Arena, Lusail, Qatar	
20	MF & DAZN: X Series 20	Darren Till vs. Anthony Taylor	18 January 2025	Co-op Live, Manchester, England	
—	Misfits 21 – Unfinished Business	KSI vs. Dillon Danis	Cancelled (Note: Originally scheduled for 29 March 2025, the event was cancelled due to KSI falling ill and a rescheduled date could not be determined.)	Manchester Arena, Manchester, England	
21	Misfits 21 – Blinders & Brawls	Darren Till vs. Darren Stewart	16 May 2025 (Note: Originally scheduled for 12 April 2025 but was postponed due to the cancellation of Misfits 21 – Unfinished Business and scheduling issues.)	Vaillant Live, Derby, England	
22	Misfits 22 – Ring of Thrones	Darren Till vs. Luke Rockhold (Note: The event was marketed as a double main event, with Tony Ferguson vs. Salt Papi acting as the second feature.)	30 August 2025	Manchester Arena, Manchester, England	
23	MF Duel	Lil Cracra vs. FoxTheG	9 November 2025	Nashville Municipal Auditorium, Nashville, Tennessee, US	
24	Misfits Mania – The Fight Before Christmas	Andrew Tate vs. Chase DeMoor	20 December 2025	Dubai Duty Free Tennis Stadium, Dubai, UAE	
25	MF Duel 2	Ty Mitchell vs. Gabriel Rosado	7 March 2026	Vaillant Live, Derby, England	
26 (Note: Co-promoted with Fame Fighting.)	Fame Fighting vs. Misfits Boxing	Aleks Petrović vs. Chase DeMoor	6 June 2026	Ostermann-Arena, Leverkusen, Germany	
27	Misfits 23 – Beauty vs. The Beast	Tommy Fury vs. Eddie Hall	13 June 2026	Manchester Arena, Manchester, England	
28	McCann vs. Stacks	Jordan McCann vs. Big Stacks	12 September 2026	Utilita Arena, Newcastle upon Tyne, England	
29	Cejudo vs. Walton	Henry Cejudo vs. Javon Walton	26 September 2026	James L. Knight Center, Miami, Florida, US	
30	Essex vs. Dapper	Joey Essex vs. Dapper Laughs	10 October 2026	Copper Box Arena, London, England	
31	DeMoor vs. Arlovski: New Blood	Chase DeMoor vs. Andrei Arlovski	18 December 2026	Nashville Municipal Auditorium, Nashville, Tennessee, US	
TBD	Untitled Misfits Mania Event	TBA	2027	TBA	

=== MF Pro ===
No.	Event	Headline	Titles(s)	Date	Location	Ref
1	Conlan vs. Walsh	Mick Conlan vs. Kevin Walsh	WBC International featherweight title	20 March 2026	SSE Arena, Belfast, Northern Ireland	
2 (Note: Co-promoted with Queensberry Promotions.)	Chisora vs. Wilder: An Icon Will Fall	Derek Chisora vs. Deontay Wilder	—N/a	4 April 2026	The O2 Arena, London, England	
3	Edwards vs. Nqothole: Brawl Hall	Charlie Edwards vs. Sikho Nqothole	—N/a	29 May 2026	York Hall, London, England	
4	Sylve vs. Diaz: Pugilist Revolution	Ashton Sylve vs. Joseph Diaz	—N/a	19 June 2026	Thunder Studios, Long Beach, California, US	
5 (Note: Co-promoted with Neilson Boxing.)	Eubank vs. Papot	Harlem Eubank vs. David Papot	IBF International welterweight title	18 July 2026	Copper Box Arena, London, England	
6	Riley vs. Coupe	Viddal Riley vs. Seydi Coupe	European cruiserweight title	14 November 2026	Wembley Arena, London, England	
7 (Note: Co-promoted with Golden Boy Promotions.)	Jones vs. Pettus	Amari Jones vs. DeAundre Pettus	—N/a	20 November 2026	Fantasy Springs Resort Casino, Indio, California, US	
8	Eubank vs. Outlaw	Harlem Eubank vs. Greg Outlaw	—N/a	5 February 2027	Brighton Centre, Brighton, England	

=== Other ===
No.	Event	Headline	Date	Location	Ref
— (Note: Co-hosted by DAZN and Misfits' "X Series" branding in English-speaking markets while promoted by Global Titans and Mayweather Promotions. Misfits broadcast the press conference.)	Mayweather vs. Deji	Floyd Mayweather Jr. vs. Deji Olatunji	13 November 2022	Coca-Cola Arena, Dubai, UAE	
— (Note: Promoted by Kalle Sauerland under "Team Sauerland," adjacent to MF Pro.)	Kessler vs. Joseph: The Comeback	Mikkel Kessler vs. Bernard Joseph	28 November 2026	Brøndbyhallen, Brøndby, Denmark	

== Pay-per-view events ==
List of events that were pay-per-view across all MF Sports division.

No.	Date	Fight	Billing	Network	Buys	Revenue	Source(s)
1	27 August 2022	KSI vs Pineda	2 Fights 1 Night	DAZN	445,000	£4,450,000	
2	14 January 2023	KSI vs Temperrr	Uncaged	DAZN	300,000	£3,000,000	
3	13 May 2023	KSI vs Fournier	007	DAZN	300,000	£6,000,000	
4	14 October 2023	KSI vs Fury; Paul vs Danis	The Prime Card; Judgement Day	DAZN / YouTube	1,300,000	£26,000,000	
5	31 August 2024	Aarons vs Simpson	—N/a	DAZN / YouTube	Undisclosed	—N/a	—N/a
6	28 November 2024	Gib vs Slim	Qatar: The Supercard	DAZN / YouTube	Undisclosed	—N/a	—N/a
7	30 August 2025	Till vs Rockhold; Ferguson vs Papi	Ring of Thrones	DAZN	Undisclosed	—N/a	—N/a
8	4 April 2026	Chisora vs Wilder	An Icon Will Fall	DAZN	Undisclosed	—N/a	—N/a
9	13 June 2026	Fury vs Hall	Beauty vs. The Beast	DAZN	Undisclosed	—N/a	—N/a
Total					2,300,503	£39,450,000	

== See also ==
- KSI vs Jake Paul
- Most Valuable Promotions
