= Louis Theroux: Inside the Manosphere =

2026 documentary film by Adrian Choa

- Official release poster
- Directed by: Adrian Choa
- Produced by: Louis Theroux; Aloke Devichand; Arron Fellows
- Narrated by: Louis Theroux
- Edited by: Charlie MacDonald
- Production company: The Mindhouse Productions
- Distributed by: Netflix
- Release date: 11 March 2026
- Running time: 90 minutes
- Country: United Kingdom
- Language: English

Louis Theroux: Inside the Manosphere is a 2026 British documentary film directed by Adrian Choa and presented by Louis Theroux. Released globally on Netflix on 11 March 2026, the project marks Theroux's debut as a presenter for the streaming platform. The documentary explores the "manosphere", an online ecosystem of content creators advocating for hypermasculinity, "red-pill" philosophy, and often controversial views on gender roles.

== Background and release ==
In an interview for Wired, Theroux stated that Inside the Manosphere built on themes he had explored frequently in previous documentaries: "cultlike groupings, misogyny, adult content, creation of pornographic content, and obviously racism. All these taboo areas of life that I've spent my TV work documenting in different forms come together in the manosphere". He had previously touched on manosphere content through interviews with right-wing influencers Baked Alaska and Nick Fuentes in 2022. The presenter said that he was drawn by the challenge of filming subjects who were recording him in turn and transforming the filming crew's presence into content.

Theroux had contacted prominent manosphere influencer Andrew Tate to discuss filming with him; Tate responded with: "I'm the most relevant man on the planet. And who are you? You were relevant years ago?" Tate followed this with a Google Trends screenshot comparing Tate and Theroux's search interest over time. According to Theroux, his own search interest was "down near death" in the graph whereas Tate's was "quite high all the way along". However, at the very end of the graphic, Theroux's "picked up and actually overtook his", something Tate did not respond to when this was pointed out.

== Synopsis and themes ==
The documentary investigates the online subculture known as the manosphere, a loose network of internet influencers, communities, and content creators who promote highly traditional views about masculinity, gender roles, and relationships.

The film follows Theroux as he meets several prominent figures within this online ecosystem, many of whom run podcasts, livestreams, and social-media channels aimed primarily at young men. These creators present themselves as mentors on topics such as dating, success, and personal status, often promoting ideas about male dominance and criticising feminism. Through interviews and observations, the documentary examines how these personalities build large audiences and cultivate loyal online communities.

A central theme of the documentary is the business model behind the manosphere. Many influencers attract attention through provocative or controversial statements, which help their content spread widely on social media. Once they gain followers, they frequently monetise their popularity by selling courses, private memberships, coaching programs, or lifestyle brands that promise financial success or improved relationships.

Theroux also explores the appeal and influence of these communities, particularly among young men who feel uncertain about identity, success, or relationships. By spending time with leading influencers and attending their events, the documentary investigates how their messages are framed, how audiences respond to them, and how online platforms amplify such content.

== Subjects ==
For the documentary, Theroux focuses on prominent influencers associated with the manosphere, including:

- Harrison Sullivan, known online as HSTikkyTokky
- Nicolas Kenn De Balinthazy, known online as Sneako
- Amrou Fudl, known online as Myron Gaines
- Justin Waller
- Ed Matthews

== Critical reception ==
Initial reception of Inside the Manosphere was mixed. Some commentators criticised the lack of female voices in the documentary and felt that it did not break any new ground in coverage of the manosphere. Others said that it was essential viewing for anyone unaware of the pervasiveness of manosphere content online and its direct link to misogyny.

Adam White of The Independent labelled the documentary a "failure" by virtue of its subject matter, since Theroux's "methods of gentle, observational needling prove no match for an online culture defined by its apathetic immorality". The review stated that Theroux's attempts to intellectualise his interviewees' views and point out their hypocrisies mean little for a sub-culture which "positions personal financial gain above all else". For White, the documentary's ultimate failure is that it contributes to that gain, providing "maximum exposure to individuals who consider any kind of attention a win. It leaves a bitter, nasty taste in the mouth".

Lucy Mangan, writing for The Guardian, similarly criticised Theroux's typical documentary technique as incompatible for a manosphere focus: "the silent supposed bafflement and dependence on giving people enough rope to hang themselves, which are such a large part of his arsenal, look like increasingly feeble weapons when the matters are of such increasing importance in all of our lives". Mangan noted further that the appearances of the women in the featured creators' lives were "potentially very interesting" and something Theroux should have pursued further. His alternative focus on the men's childhoods, for Mangan, "begins to seem a lot like excuse-hunting instead of an interrogation" of their views. Mangan also stated that Theroux was "a bit late to the party", with so many other manosphere documentaries already available, and questioned whether a documentary on this theme fronted by a woman "might yield something new".

Annabel Hoare's review for The Conversation aligned with White's view that the documentary amplified the profiles of manosphere creators without providing appropriate pushback to their views. For Hoare, "the danger is that viewers may come away with a clear understanding of the style and aspirations of the manosphere. But they are left in the dark as to its harmful effects both to young men and women – and how this harm occurs".
