= Sneako =

American political commentator (born 1998)

- Sneako in 2021
- Born: Nicolas Kenn De Balinthazy; September 8, 1998 (age 28); New York City, U.S.
- Occupations: Online streamer; internet personality; political commentator
- Years active: 2013–present

Kick information
- Channel: Sneako
- Years active: 2023–present
- Followers: 102.8 thousand

X information
- Handle: @sneako

YouTube information
- Years active: 2013–2022; 2025–present
- Subscribers: 1.33 million (November 19, 2026)
- Views: 103.02 million (November 19, 2026)

Nicolas Kenn De Balinthazy (born September 8, 1998), known online as Sneako, is an American live streamer and social media personality. He initially gained prominence on YouTube in the mid-2010s for lifestyle content, video essays, and street interviews.

His content then shifted toward far-right politics, trolling, misogyny and antisemitism, and he collaborated with figures including white nationalist Nick Fuentes and influencer Andrew Tate. His conduct led to permanent bans from YouTube, Twitch and TikTok.

== Career ==
=== Early YouTube work (2013–2021) ===
Sneako began uploading videos to YouTube in 2013. His early videos were apolitical gaming and filming man-on-the-street interviews, often about dating, before briefly working for YouTuber Jimmy Donaldson, also known as MrBeast. His topics began to shift into right-wing trolling, such as asking white people on the street to say racial slurs for one dollar. He would also host discussions on why men and women are not equal.

=== Bans and platform changes (2022–2025) ===
In 2022, Sneako was banned from YouTube. He was banned from Twitch the following year. Following his removals, he began streaming on Rumble, where he became popular with young male viewers.

In October 2024, Sneako was banned from YouTube again within 24 hours of a reinstatement. He was also banned from TikTok in early 2024 for promoting violent misogynistic content, according to Media Matters for America.

In October 2025, Sneako publicly criticized Twitch after the platform reinstated streamers Nina Lin and Zoe Spencer following a 24-hour suspension related to a widely circulated clip in which they were accused of sexually assaulting a man on camera. In response, Sneako publicly criticized the decision on X, questioning why he remained permanently banned while other creators received rapid reinstatement. In posts on X and in a video cited by SoapCentral, Sneako contrasted their short suspension with his own permanent ban from Twitch, claiming he had never been given a clear explanation beyond "hateful conduct".

=== Later activities (2024–2025) ===
In late November 2024, Sneako launched a new video series titled Project X (PRJX), which he posted exclusively on X (formerly Twitter). Filmed primarily in New York City, the videos featured interviews with strangers and commentary on social issues including pornography, masculinity, and comparisons between online careers and traditional employment.

In May 2025, Sneako appeared with Kanye West in a virtual interview with Piers Morgan on Piers Morgan Uncensored. The discussion, intended to address West's online conduct, escalated after Morgan questioned his social media presence and past statements. West abruptly ended the interview mid-conversation, and Sneako exited shortly afterward, criticizing Morgan's approach. The walkout received widespread attention and was later uploaded to Morgan's official YouTube channel. In June 2025, Sneako appeared outside the Manhattan courthouse during Sean "Diddy" Combs' then-ongoing trial, where he confronted a reporter for referring to West by his former name instead of "Ye". The interaction was streamed live and shared widely on social media.

=== Reinstatement ===
In October 2025, Sneako's main YouTube channel and secondary channels were reinstated after nearly three years of suspension. He announced the reinstatement on X and later posted a video about his return, stating that he intended to focus on "more constructive" content; the unbanning followed similar reinstatements of other previously banned creators on the platform.

In November 2025, Sneako said that his YouTube channel had been fully remonetized following its reinstatement, and described the process as stressful but ultimately successful. YouTube had restored his channels in October 2025 through a pilot program for creators previously banned over misinformation, and remonetized them a month later.

=== 2026 ===
In March 2026, Sneako was a central figure in Louis Theroux: Inside the Manosphere, a Netflix documentary about the manosphere.

In May 2026, Sneako was removed from Australia and given a lifetime ban on re-entering the country to prevent him from spreading hate speech.

In November 2026, Sneako expanded his international livestreaming activities through a series of travel-based broadcasts across Central Asia and Afghanistan. His content documented visits to Uzbekistan, Kyrgyzstan, Kazakhstan and Afghanistan, featuring cultural encounters, religious discussions and interviews with local figures. During his visit to Afghanistan, he and his acquaintance Orthodox Muslim interviewed Taliban official Anas Haqqani and Afghan Foreign Ministry spokesperson Abdul Qahar Balkhi, discussing the country's political situation, its history and relations with the United States. His broadcasts also included visits to local markets and educational institutions. The trip marked a further expansion of his content from conventional political commentary and livestream discussions into international on-location reporting and interviews.

== Social media content and rhetoric ==
According to The Guardian, by 2016, Sneako's content had shifted toward misogyny, praise for Hitler, and antisemitic jokes. He was associated with online personalities such as Andrew Tate, whom he has credited with improving his life, and later became associated with rapper Kanye West and far-right activist Nick Fuentes.

=== Anti-LGBTQ+ ===
In 2023, he defended sports fans who were recorded shouting homophobic and transphobic remarks at a game he attended, arguing that "they are children and obviously joking" and blaming pride flags in classrooms. He later accused MrBeast of "pushing kids into transgenderism" by supporting Ava Kris Tyson, a trans woman affiliated with the MrBeast channel. In July 2023, in a livestream with Nick Fuentes and other right-wing extremists, Sneako disputed Matt Walsh's claim that "transgenderism" was created by the Nazis, instead claiming it was a Jewish invention.

=== Antisemitism ===
Sneako has refused to call Hitler "evil", wrote on X that people should not "bash" Hitler for killing Jewish people and wished him a happy birthday, and (talking about roleplay) said "I'll be the Nazi and I'll shove you in the oven like a dirty Jew."

In January 2026, Sneako was among a group of far-right influencers filmed at Vendôme, a nightclub in Miami Beach, Florida, singing along to "Heil Hitler", a song by Kanye West that has been banned in Germany and restricted by major U.S. platforms; some of the group were also filmed making Nazi salutes, according to clips that circulated on social media, including footage uploaded by Sneako. The club said it had fired three employees and banned those involved from the premises.

== Political activism ==
Sneako expressed disillusionment with electoral politics following the failure of Bernie Sanders's 2016 presidential campaign, stating by 2020 that voting "doesn't matter anymore".

He was involved in Kanye West's 2024 presidential campaign, where he collaborated with Fuentes to produce social media content. During an appearance at the America First Political Action Conference, Sneako predicted that Fuentes would one day become the president of the United States.

In June 2025, he conducted an interview with then New York City mayor Eric Adams at Gracie Mansion.

== Personal life ==
Sneako was born in New York City. He has Haitian and Filipino ancestry. In 2023, he moved to Miami, Florida, and converted to Islam.

== Discography ==
=== Singles ===
- "Curry Freestyle" – Lil Pump featuring N3on and Sneako (2023)

=== Music videos ===
- "Curry Freestyle" – Lil Pump featuring N3on and Sneako (2023)

== Filmography ==
=== Film ===
- Unsubscribe (2020)
- Louis Theroux: Inside the Manosphere (2026)
