= Victor Ubogu =

England international rugby union player (born 1964)

Victor Eriakpo Ubogu
- Born: 8 September 1964 (age 62) Lagos, Nigeria
- Height: 5 ft 9 in (1.75 m)
- Weight: 238 lb (108 kg)

Rugby union career
- Position: Prop
International career
| Years | Team | Apps | (Points) |
| 1992–1999 | England | 24 | (5) |

Victor Eriakpo Ubogu (born 8 September 1964) is a former rugby union player. A prop, he played for Bath. Born in Nigeria, he moved to England as a child, and went on to play 24 times for England, including at two World Cups.

== Early life ==
In 1977, after arriving in the United Kingdom from Lagos, Nigeria, he attended West Buckland School in Devon. While at the school, he played for England Under-18s. He went to the University of Birmingham to study chemical engineering. While at university, he played for Moseley. He then went to St Anne's College, Oxford, where he was selected to play with the University of Oxford RFC and achieved his Blue.

== Rugby career ==
After leaving Oxford, he joined Bath. He started for Bath in the victorious 1998 Heineken Cup Final, when they defeated Brive. In 1992, he made his debut the England national rugby union team, and went on to win 24 caps until 1999.

== Post-career ventures ==
Ubogu founded the "Shoeless Joe's" chain of sports bars. In 2001, Ubogu appeared on Lily Savage's Blankety Blank.

== Personal life ==
Ubogu is the father of social media personality Harrison Sullivan, known as HSTikkyTokky.
