= Danny Simpson =

English footballer (born 1987)

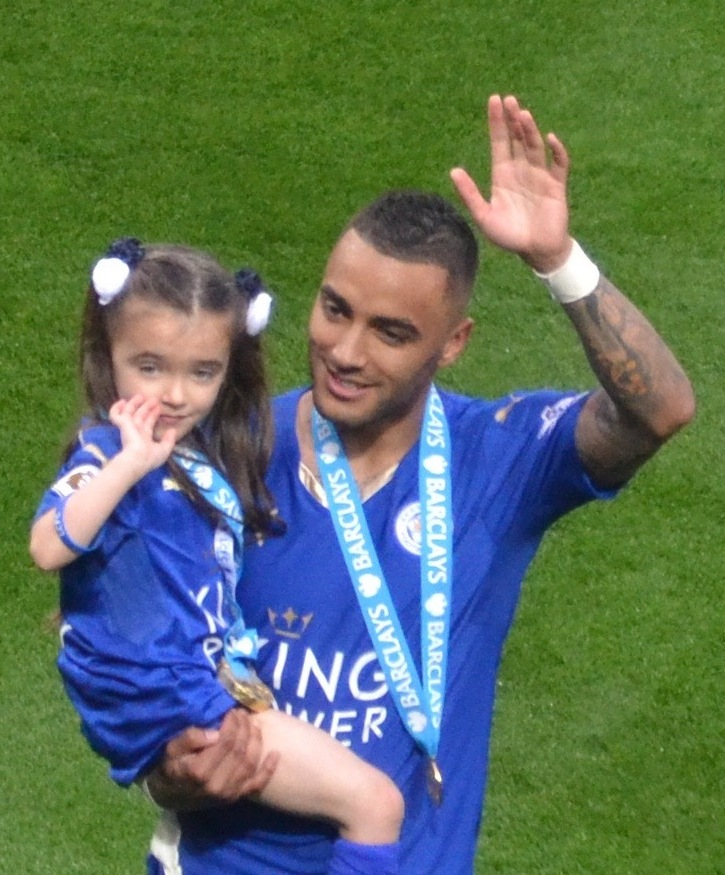
- Simpson with Leicester City in 2016

Personal information
- Full name: Daniel Peter Simpson
- Date of birth: 4 January 1987 (age 39)
- Place of birth: Eccles, Greater Manchester, England
- Height: 5 ft 9 in (1.76 m)
- Position: Right-back

Team information
- Current team: Arabian Falcons (player-coach)
- Number: 17

Youth career
- –2003: Parkwyddn JFC
- 2003–2006: Manchester United

Senior career*
Years	Team	Apps	(Gls)
2006–2010	Manchester United	3	(0)
2006	→ Royal Antwerp (loan)	30	(1)
2007	→ Sunderland (loan)	14	(0)
2008	→ Ipswich Town (loan)	8	(0)
2008–2009	→ Blackburn Rovers (loan)	12	(0)
2009–2010	→ Newcastle United (loan)	20	(1)
2010–2013	Newcastle United	103	(0)
2013–2014	Queens Park Rangers	37	(0)
2014–2019	Leicester City	113	(0)
2019–2020	Huddersfield Town	24	(0)
2021–2022	Bristol City	7	(0)
2023–2024	Macclesfield	0	(0)
2026	Stretford Paddock	0	(0)
2026–	Arabian Falcons	1	(0)
Total		372	(2)
- * Club domestic league appearances and goals

Daniel Peter Simpson (born 4 January 1987) is an English footballer who plays as a right-back for Arabian Falcons. He started his career at Manchester United in the Premier League, later loaned for Royal Antwerp, Sunderland, Ipswich Town, Blackburn Rovers and Newcastle United during his professional development.

He signed for Newcastle on a permanent basis in January 2010, before relocating to Queens Park Rangers on a free transfer in June 2013. He signed for Leicester City in 2014, then newly promoted to the Premier League. He was part of the Leicester squad that avoided relegation, in his first season, before winning the Premier League title in the 2015–16 season. He left Leicester for Huddersfield Town in 2019, but was released a year later. He then joined Bristol City where he made seven appearances for the club between 2021 and 2022, after this he joined Macclesfield where he didn't make a single appearance, retiring after that.

He had an exhibition boxing match in August 2024 against Danny Aarons at the 3Arena. The bout ended in a split draw.

== Football career ==
=== Manchester United ===
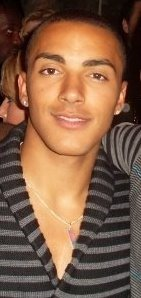
Simpson pictured during his time at Manchester United in 2009

Simpson was born in Eccles, Greater Manchester, to a Jamaican father and English mother. Simpson played for Parkwyddn JFC in Eccles as a youth before being picked up by Manchester United. He is a product of the Manchester United youth system, having come up through the ranks into the reserve squad in 2005.

In early January 2006, he was sent on loan, along with three other United youths, to the Belgian Second Division club Royal Antwerp for the remainder of the season, to gain match experience. Simpson also spent the first half of the 2006–07 season at Antwerp before returning to United in January 2007.

On 25 January 2007, he joined Sunderland on loan for the rest of the season. The loan move saw him link up with fellow Manchester United player Jonny Evans. He won the Championship title with Sunderland that season. Simpson returned to United at the start of the 2007–08 season and signed a new contract in September 2007 that would keep him at the club until 2010. He made his first competitive appearance for United on 26 September 2007 in the 2–0 League Cup loss to Coventry City, and soon after made his Premier League debut on 6 October 2007 against Wigan Athletic at Old Trafford, coming on as a 30th-minute substitute for the injured John O'Shea. He set up the fourth goal with a well flighted cross for Wayne Rooney. The match ended with a 4–0 win to United. His European debut came on 23 October 2007, when he came on as an 80th-minute substitute for Ryan Giggs against Dynamo Kyiv. His first European start was in the reverse fixture against Dynamo Kyiv on 7 November 2007; United won the game 4–0.

On 21 March 2008, Simpson signed a loan deal with Ipswich Town. With Gary Neville on the verge of returning to the Manchester United first team, United manager Alex Ferguson decided it was best for Simpson to get as much first team football as possible, something that would be quite hard to come by at Old Trafford with both Gary Neville and Wes Brown ahead of Simpson in the pecking order.

On 4 August 2008, Simpson signed for Blackburn Rovers on a season-long loan deal. Simpson made his Blackburn debut on 27 August 2008, playing in Rovers' 4–1 win over Grimsby Town in the League Cup Second Round. His Premier League debut for Blackburn Rovers came almost three weeks later, on 13 September 2008, in a 4–0 defeat at home to Arsenal. With the exception of Blackburn's League Cup Fifth Round defeat by Manchester United, which he was forced to miss because of a clause in his loan agreement, Simpson was ever-present for Blackburn during their League Cup and FA Cup campaigns. He also played in 11 out of the 14 league matches for which he was eligible prior to Christmas 2008, although he was named on the bench for the other three. After Christmas, Simpson only played in one further league match, another 4–0 defeat to Arsenal, and in early May 2009, with his first team opportunities limited at Blackburn, the loan agreement was terminated early and he returned to train with Manchester United.

=== Newcastle United ===
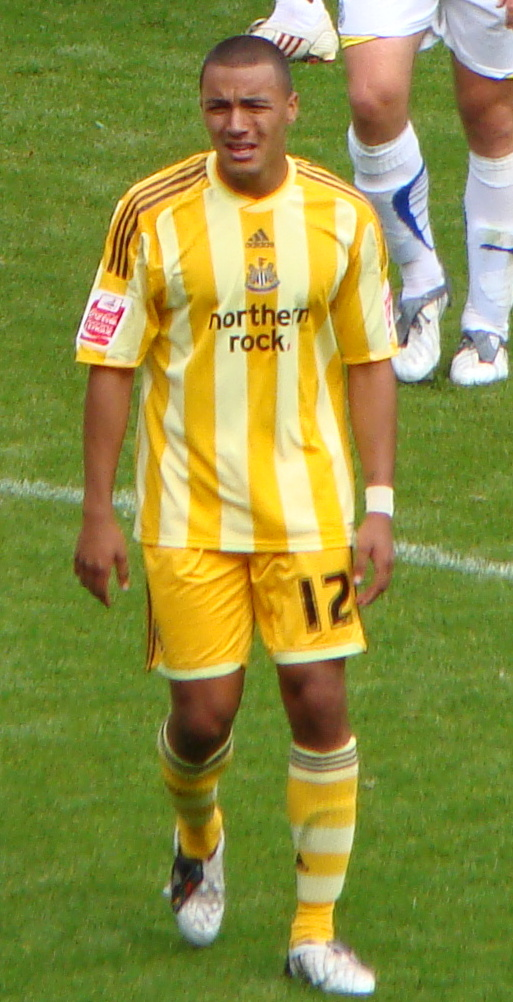
Simpson playing for Newcastle United in 2009

On 14 August 2009, Simpson joined Newcastle United on loan until January 2010, making his debut in a 1–0 victory over Sheffield Wednesday at St. James' Park. He scored his first goal for Newcastle against Peterborough United on 7 November 2009.

Following the completion of the loan deal, Newcastle made a bid to keep Simpson on a permanent basis. An undisclosed fee, reported as being in the region of £750,000, was agreed between Newcastle and Manchester United and Simpson signed a three-and-a-half-year contract on 20 January 2010.

He played a solid part in Newcastle's promotion to the Premier League, winning his second Championship title in the process, while forming a right flank partnership with January signing Wayne Routledge. Towards the end of the season, he "played through the pain" with what he considered a small ankle injury. He only realised the full extent of the ankle injury at the end of the season, and he had an operation to correct it. He was out for three months, including the first month or so of Newcastle's season. Simpson returned to action from his injury lay off, playing two reserve games in October. He made his first start of the new season in Newcastle's 2–1 victory over West Ham United, replacing James Perch at right back. Simpson kept his right-back spot with consistently strong performances, forming a strong partnership with Joey Barton on the right flank.

On 20 September 2011, Simpson scored a curler in Newcastle's 4–3 win over Championship side Nottingham Forest in the third round of the League Cup.

On 10 December 2011, Simpson started alongside James Perch at center back in place of the injured Steven Taylor and Fabricio Coloccini for Newcastle's 4–2 defeat at Norwich City. He had played at right back for the beginning of the season.

=== Queens Park Rangers ===
After his contract with Newcastle expired at the end of the 2012–13 season, Simpson signed a three-year deal with Championship club Queens Park Rangers on 27 June 2013. He scored his first goal for QPR in a League Cup tie against Exeter City on 6 August 2013. He made 36 Championship appearances for QPR as they earned promotion via the play-offs.

=== Leicester City ===
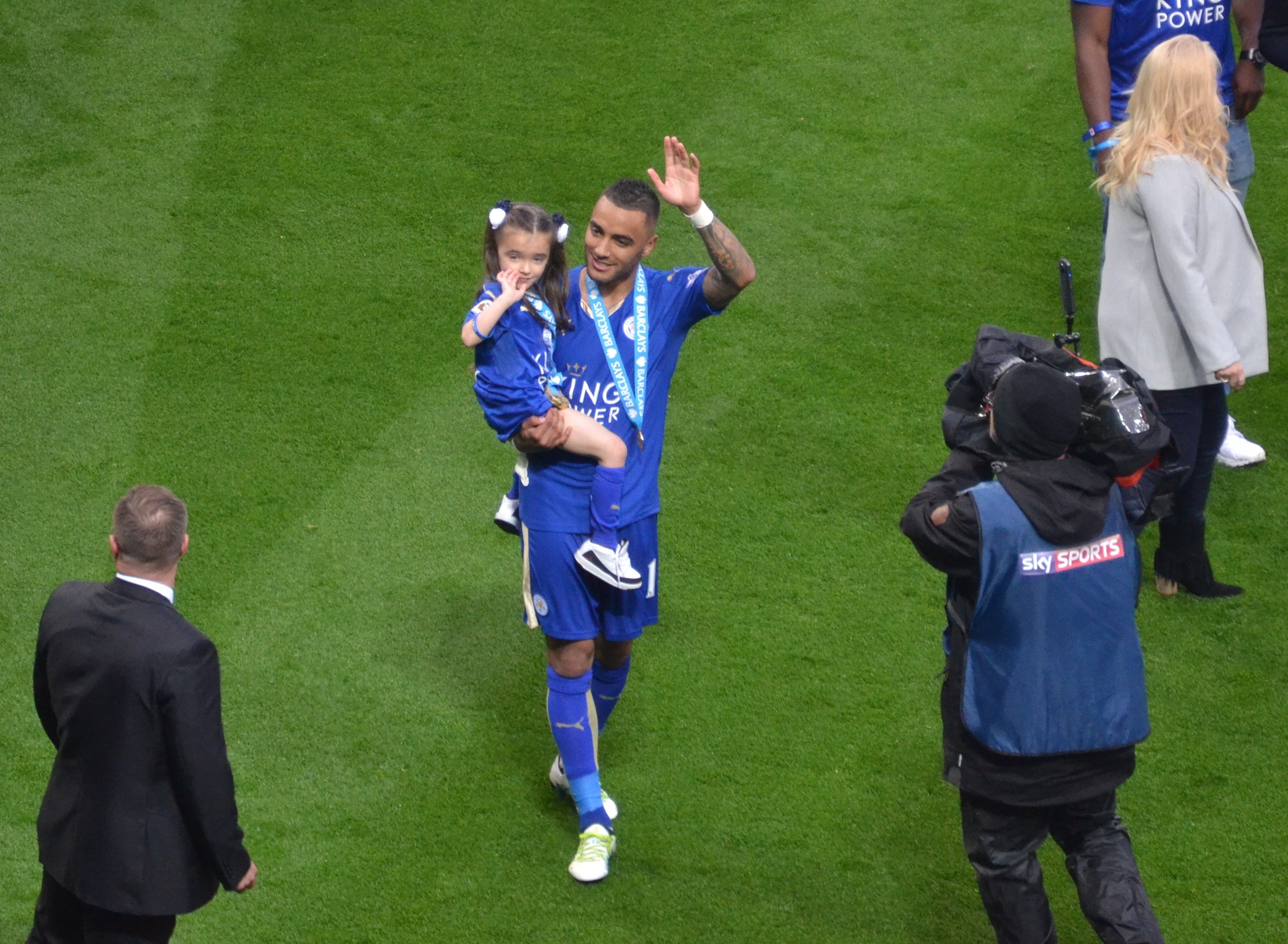
Simpson and his daughter celebrating Leicester's title win on 7 May 2016

On 30 August 2014 signed a three-year contract for fellow promoted team Leicester City for an undisclosed fee. Simpson made his Leicester debut in a 2–0 defeat against Crystal Palace off the bench on 27 September 2014. However, he didn't make his second appearance for the club until 7 December against Aston Villa, as he often struggled to get into the side ahead of regular right back Ritchie De Laet. Simpson made 14 appearances overall for Leicester in the 2014–15 season.

In the 2015–16 season, under the new management of Claudio Ranieri, De Laet was again preferred ahead of Simpson to begin with. However, following a 5–2 defeat by Arsenal, Ranieri changed his full backs bringing Simpson in for De Laet helping to shore up Leicester's defence, as Simpson was considered a much more defensive full-back than De Laet and "rarely ventured forward". Leicester went on to win the 2015–16 Premier League title, and Simpson earned a winner's medal with 30 league appearances.

He was released by Leicester at the end of the 2018–19 season.

In February and March 2021, Simpson began playing with the Leicester City U23s squad in order to regain match fitness.

=== Huddersfield Town ===
After being released by Leicester, Simpson signed a deal until the end of the 2019–20 season with EFL Championship side Huddersfield Town.

=== Bristol City ===
On 26 March 2021, Simpson joined Bristol City on a deal until the end of the season. The move reunited him with former Leicester manager Nigel Pearson.

On 23 June 2021, it was announced Simpson had signed a new one-year contract extension with the club. This was brought to an end early on 7 March 2022, when Simpson's contract was cancelled by mutual consent.

=== As a free agent ===
Simpson began making appearances as a TV pundit in 2022. Despite this, he confirmed in a December 2022 interview, whilst launching a campaign to better support players' mental health at the end of their careers, that he was not yet retired, and was still training in the hope of finding a new club. As of May 2023, he was training with Macclesfield.

By October 2023, he had returned to Manchester United to study for his coaching badges whilst weighing up the next step in his career, alongside fellow ex-United player Phil Jones.

=== Macclesfield ===
In December 2023, Simpson was signed by Northern Premier League Premier Division club Macclesfield, making his debut on 5 December in the Cheshire Senior Cup against Tranmere Rovers.

On 26 July 2024, Simpson announced his retirement from professional football.

== Boxing career ==
=== Simpson vs Aarons ===
On 7 August 2024, it was announced that Simpson would partake in an exhibition boxing match headlining MF & DAZN: X Series 17 at the 3Arena in Dublin, Ireland against English YouTuber and streamer Danny Aarons. During the leadup to the bout, Simpson and Aarons agreed that the winner will receive either Simpson's 2015–16 Premier League title winner's medal or Aarons' YouTube Creator Award.

The bout ended in a split draw, with one judge scoring it 39–37 to Simpson, 39–37 to Aarons and 38–38. Both men indicated they were interested in a rematch following the announcement of the result.

== Personal life ==
Simpson has two daughters; one was born prematurely in mid-2011. The other is from his second relationship.

On 20 May 2015, Simpson was found guilty of assaulting his then-girlfriend and mother of his child on 28 December 2014. He was sentenced to 300 hours of community service. On 12 May 2016, his sentence was reviewed in light of press intrusion into his community service, and replaced with a 22:00 to 06:00 curfew for 21 days.

In September 2025 he graduated in the inaugural cohort of students from the PFA Business School, with a Diploma in Football Psychology

== Career statistics ==
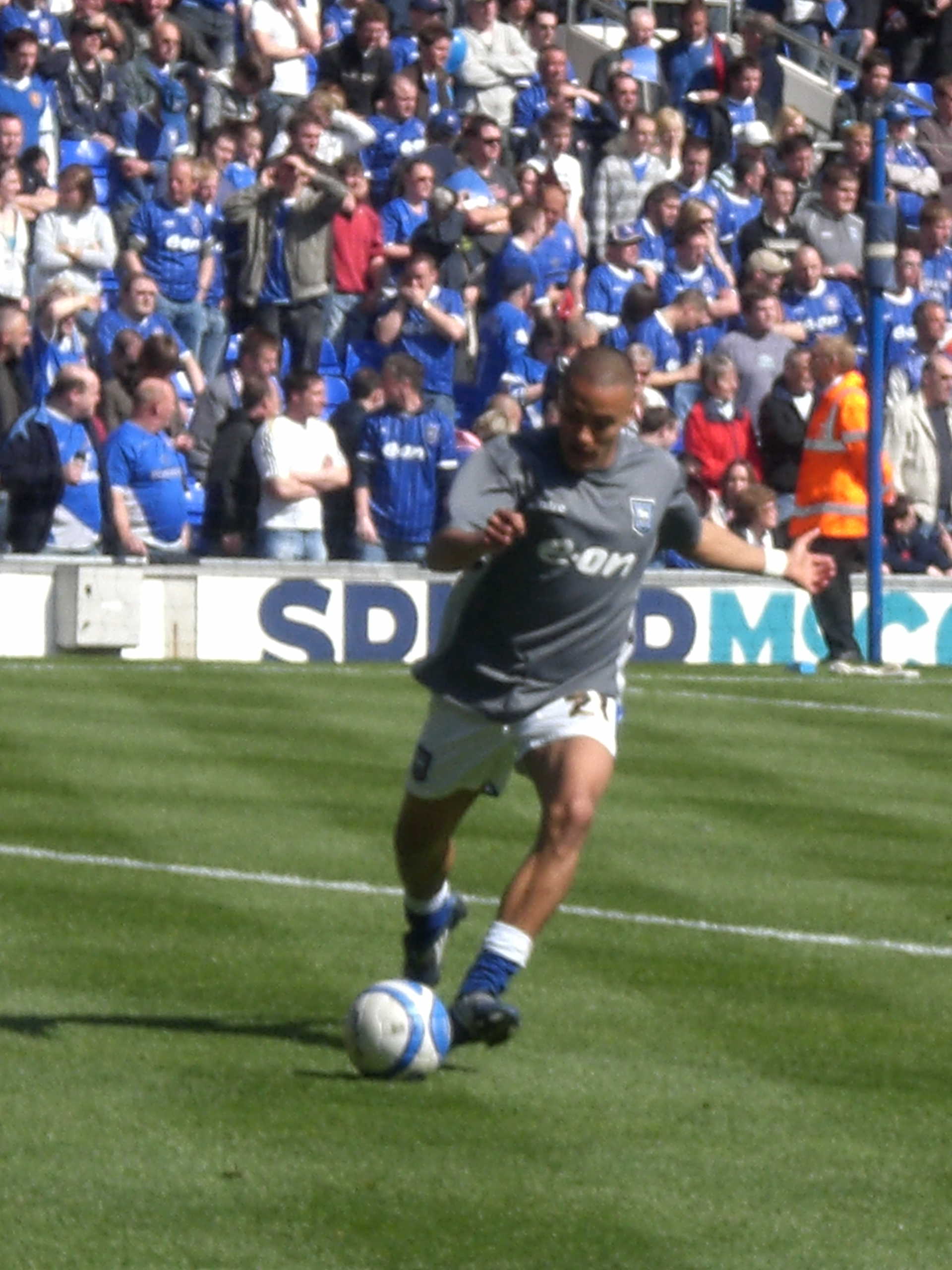
Simpson warming up for Ipswich Town in 2008

As of match played 23 October 2021

Appearances and goals by club, season and competition
Club	Season	League			National cup (Note: Includes FA Cup)		League cup (Note: Includes Football League/EFL Cup)		Europe		Other		Total	
Club	Season	Division	Apps	Goals	Apps	Goals	Apps	Goals	Apps	Goals	Apps	Goals	Apps	Goals
Manchester United	2005–06	Premier League	0	0	0	0	0	0	0	0	—		0	0
Manchester United	2006–07	Premier League	0	0	0	0	0	0	0	0	—		0	0
Manchester United	2007–08	Premier League	3	0	1	0	1	0	3 (Note: Appearances in UEFA Champions League)	0	0	0	8	0
Manchester United	2008–09	Premier League	0	0	0	0	0	0	0	0	0	0	0	0
Manchester United	2009–10	Premier League	0	0	0	0	0	0	0	0	0	0	0	0
Manchester United	Total		3	0	1	0	1	0	3	0	0	0	8	0
Royal Antwerp (loan)	2005–06	Belgian Second Division	14	0	0	0	—		—		—		14	0
Royal Antwerp (loan)	2006–07	Belgian Second Division	16	1	0	0	—		—		—		16	1
Royal Antwerp (loan)	Total		30	1	0	0	0	0	0	0	0	0	30	1
Sunderland (loan)	2006–07	Championship	14	0	—		—		—		—		14	0
Ipswich Town (loan)	2007–08	Championship	8	0	—		—		—		—		8	0
Blackburn Rovers (loan)	2008–09	Premier League	12	0	5	0	3	0	—		—		20	0
Newcastle United (loan)	2009–10	Championship	20	1	1	0	1	0	—		—		22	1
Newcastle United	2009–10	Championship	19	0	0	0	—		—		—		19	0
Newcastle United	2010–11	Premier League	30	0	1	0	0	0	—		—		31	0
Newcastle United	2011–12	Premier League	35	0	2	0	3	1	—		—		40	1
Newcastle United	2012–13	Premier League	19	0	0	0	0	0	7 (Note: Appearances in UEFA Europa League)	0	—		26	0
Newcastle United	Total		123	1	4	0	4	1	7	0	0	0	138	2
Queens Park Rangers	2013–14	Championship	36	0	1	0	2	1	—		3 (Note: Appearances in EFL Championship play-offs)	0	42	1
Queens Park Rangers	2014–15	Premier League	1	0	—		1	0	—		—		2	0
Queens Park Rangers	Total		37	0	1	0	3	1	0	0	3	0	44	1
Leicester City	2014–15	Premier League	14	0	2	0	—		—		—		16	0
Leicester City	2015–16	Premier League	30	0	1	0	1	0	—		—		32	0
Leicester City	2016–17	Premier League	35	0	2	0	1	0	6	0	1 (Note: Appearance in FA Community Shield)	0	45	0
Leicester City	2017–18	Premier League	28	0	3	0	0	0	—		—		30	0
Leicester City	2018–19	Premier League	6	0	1	0	2	0	—		—		9	0
Leicester City	Total		113	0	9	0	4	0	6	0	1	0	133	0
Leicester City U23	2018–19	—	—		—		—		—		1 (Note: Appearance in EFL Trophy)	0	1	0
Huddersfield Town	2019–20	Championship	24	0	1	0	—		—		—		25	0
Bristol City	2020–21	Championship	4	0	—		—		—		—		4	0
Bristol City	2021–22	Championship	3	0	0	0	1	0	—		—		4	0
Bristol City	Total		7	0	0	0	1	0	0	0	0	0	8	0
Career total			371	2	21	0	15	2	16	0	5	0	428	4

== Boxing record ==
=== Exhibition ===
1 fight	0 wins	0 losses
Draws	1	

No.	Result	Record	Opponent	Type	Round, time	Date	Location	Notes
1	Draw	0–0–1	Danny Aarons	SD	4	31 Aug 2024	3Arena, Dublin, Ireland	

== Pay-per-view bouts ==
United Kingdom
No.	Date	Fight	Billing	Network	Buys	Revenue	Source(s)
1	31 August 2024	Aarons vs Simpson	—N/a	DAZN	TBA	TBA	TBA

== Honours ==
Sunderland

- Football League Championship: 2006–07

Newcastle United

- Football League Championship: 2009–10

Queens Park Rangers

- Football League Championship play-offs: 2014

Leicester City

- Premier League: 2015–16
