= Mams Taylor =

British boxing promoter, talent manager, and musician

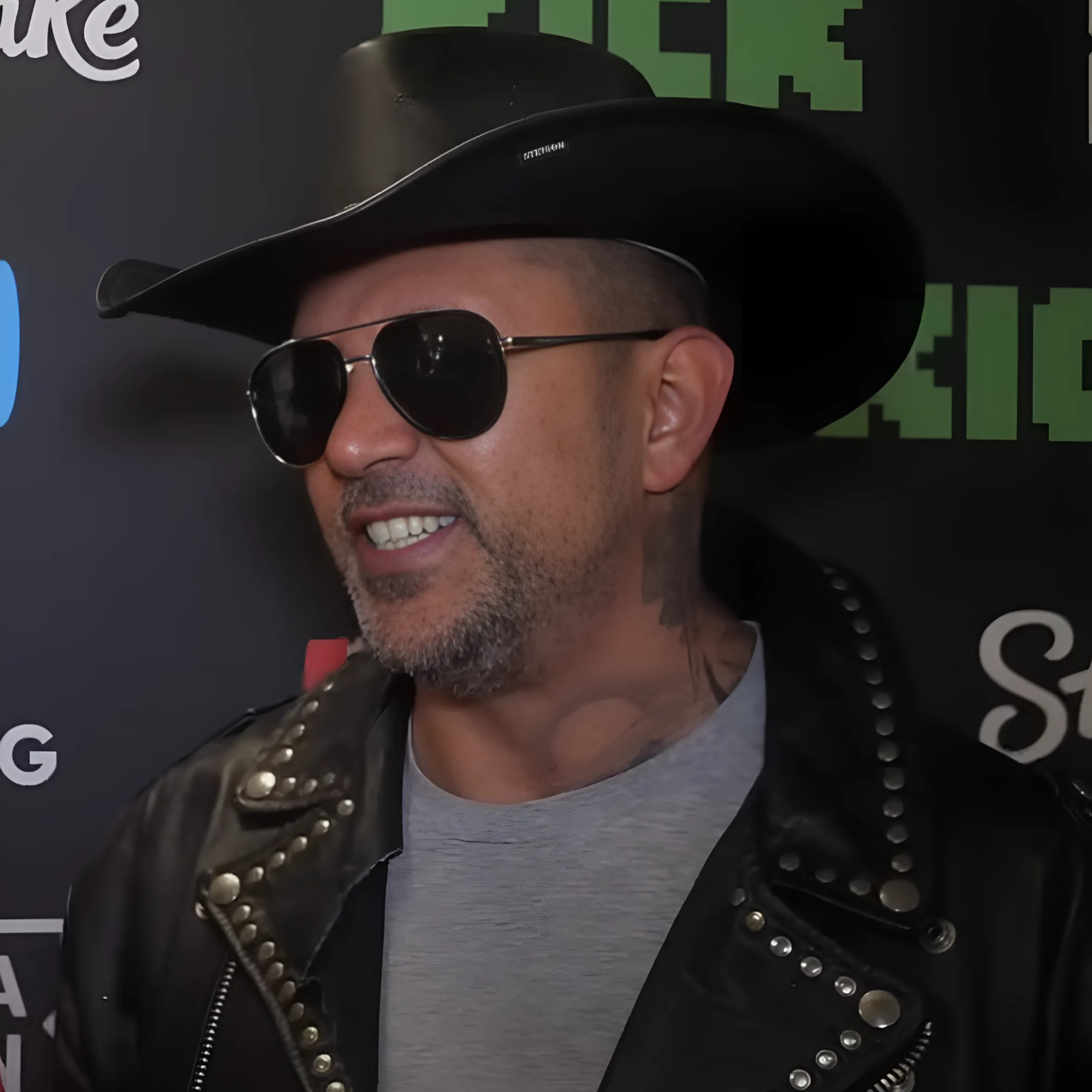
- Mams Taylor President of Misfits Boxing

Background information
- Origin: Cricklewood, London, England
- Years active: 2004-present
- Spouse: Krista Allen (m. 2010; div. 2012)
- Label: Proper Loud

Mams Taylor is an English boxing promoter, talent manager, and former musician. He is most known for being KSI's talent manager, as well as being the president of Proper Loud and the co-president of Misfits Boxing.

== Music career ==
Taylor's song "LA Girls" featuring Joel Madden of Good Charlotte was featured on the MTV show, The Hills. In addition to Taylor, the music video for "LA Girls" also stars former UFC Light Heavyweight Champion Quinton Jackson, Mila Kunis, and Carmen Electra.

A later single of Taylor's called "Girls Gotta Girlfriend" featured Snoop Dogg, and Bobby Valentino was inspired by the openness about female bisexuality in Hollywood.

In May 2013, Taylor teamed up with producer Ben Rico and formed the production/writing duo called Feelabeat. They produced and wrote a single for Carmen Electra, titled "Bigger Dick".

=== "United for Neda" ===
Taylor wrote and produced "United for Neda", which is a protest song recorded in English and Persian versions by many famous Iranian expatriates. It was inspired by the plight of Neda Agha-Soltan, a 26-year-old Iranian woman who was fatally shot on the streets of Tehran on 20 June 2010 by the Basij. Her death was recorded on a mobile phone video and received international attention when it hit the Internet.

Taylor invested one million dollars into Lady Gaga's career before she had commercially released any music and worked closely with her team as part of Coalition and Atom Factory. However, it ended up in a dispute which appears to have been settled.

Taylor has written, produced and collaborated with a wide range of notable artists, such as Tiësto, Good Charlotte, Travis Barker, Robbie Williams, Rico Love, Billy Idol, T-Pain, Lil' Kim, The Game, Papa Roach, Snoop Dogg, Rodney Jerkins, Scott Storch, Dave Navarro, among others.

In May 2013, Taylor teamed up with producer Ben Rico and formed the production/writing duo called Feelabeat. They produced and wrote a single for Carmen Electra, titled "Bigger Dick".

Taylor executive produced former Pussycat Doll Jessica Sutta's debut album, which charted in numerous territories and also achieved two number-ones on the Billboard Dance charts.

Taylor executive produced KSI's debut album Dissimulation, which debuted at number 2 on the UK Albums Chart and reached the charts in 13 other countries. He also executive produced KSI's sophomore album All Over The Place, which charted at number 1 on the UK Albums Chart and two songs from the album were nominated at The Brit Awards for song of the year.

== Boxing promoter career ==
On 22 June 2021, Taylor partnered with KSI, Kalle Sauerland, Nisse Sauerland, and Wasserman Boxing to create Misfits Boxing, a boxing promotion company dedicated to hosting crossover boxing matches where influencers and celebrities compete in the ring. He is the Co-President of Misfits Boxing.

== Business ventures ==
=== Proper Loud ===
Taylor owns a talent management company and record label called Proper Loud (formally Premier League Music), representing songwriter Rico Love, producer Diego Ave, artist/producer S-X, YouTuber/musician/boxer KSI, internet personality King Bach, YouTube couple GoldJuice and YouTuber Jidion.

Proper Loud has achieved a number of accolades, 31 plaques of gold or platinum status, representing their clients and also for Taylor's creative involvement. Over the years, Taylor has facilitated major deals for his clients in publishing, recording and selling of catalogues. He earned a major deal for his client, Rico Love, with Hipgnosis Songs Fund.

=== The Online Takeover ===
On 16 February 2021, Taylor and KSI partnered for the creation of the label named "The Online Takeover". The first signee of the label was American-British singer Aiyana-Lee, who featured on the track "Killa Killa". On 13 May 2022, KSI announced that he and Proper Loud had signed Yxng Dave to The Online Takeover, making him the second artist to be signed to the label.

== Personal life ==
On 10 October 2010, Taylor married actress Krista Allen. Allen filed for divorce at the Los Angeles County Superior Court on 12 February 2012.

== Controversy ==
=== Hitting Jesse Metcalfe ===
A video of Taylor hitting actor Jesse Metcalfe has been repeatedly featured on the television program TMZ.

== Discography ==
=== Studio albums ===
| Title | Details |
|---|---|
| King Amongst Men: The Lost Album | Released: 24 November 2009; Label: Premier League Music; Formats: Digital download, streaming, CD |

=== Mixtapes ===
| Title | Details |
|---|---|
| The R-Evolution of Runk | Released: 18 August 2009; Label: Premier League Music; Formats: Digital download, CD |

=== Singles ===
| Title | Year |
|---|---|
| "Girls Gotta Girlfriend" (featuring Snoop Dogg and Bobby V.) | 2009 |

=== Other credits ===
List of songs executive produced or written, showing year released and album name
| Title | Year | Artist | Credits | Certifications | Album |
|---|---|---|---|---|---|
| "Rich 'N Thuggin'" | 2011 | Glasses Malone | Producer | | Beach Cruiser |
| "Bigger Dick" | 2013 | Carmen Electra | Songwriter | | Non-album single |
| "Water Into Wine" | 2016 | Jessica Sutta | Songwriter | | Feline Resurrection |
| "Diving Deep" | 2016 | Jessica Sutta | Songwriter | | Feline Resurrection |
| "Torn Fishnets & Broken Heels" | 2016 | Jessica Sutta | Songwriter | | Feline Resurrection |
| "Get Lost" | 2016 | Jessica Sutta | Songwriter | | Non-album single |
| "Sunday Island" | 2017 | Jessica Sutta | Songwriter | | I Say Yes |
| "Lot On My Mind" | 2019 | S-X | Songwriter | | True Colours |
| "Wake Up Call" (featuring Trippie Redd) | 2020 | KSI | Songwriter | BPI: Silver | Dissimulation |
| "Inside My Sin" | 2020 | Aiyana-Lee | Songwriter | | Non-album single |
| "Bad Lil Vibe" (featuring Jeremih) | 2020 | KSI | Songwriter | | Dissimulation |
| "Lose" (with Lil Wayne) | 2021 | KSI | Executive producer | | All Over the Place |
| "Clear Out Time" | 2021 | S-X | Songwriter | | A Repeat Wouldn’t Go A Miss |
| "All Night" (featuring Trippie Redd) | 2022 | S-X | Songwriter | | Things Change |
| "Summer Is Over" | 2022 | KSI | Composer | | TBA |

== Awards and nominations ==
| Year | Award | Category | Recipient(s) | Result | Ref. |
|---|---|---|---|---|---|
| 2022 | Music Week Awards | Manager of the Year | Himself | Nominated | |
