= Kalle Sauerland =

Anglo-German boxing promoter (born 1977)

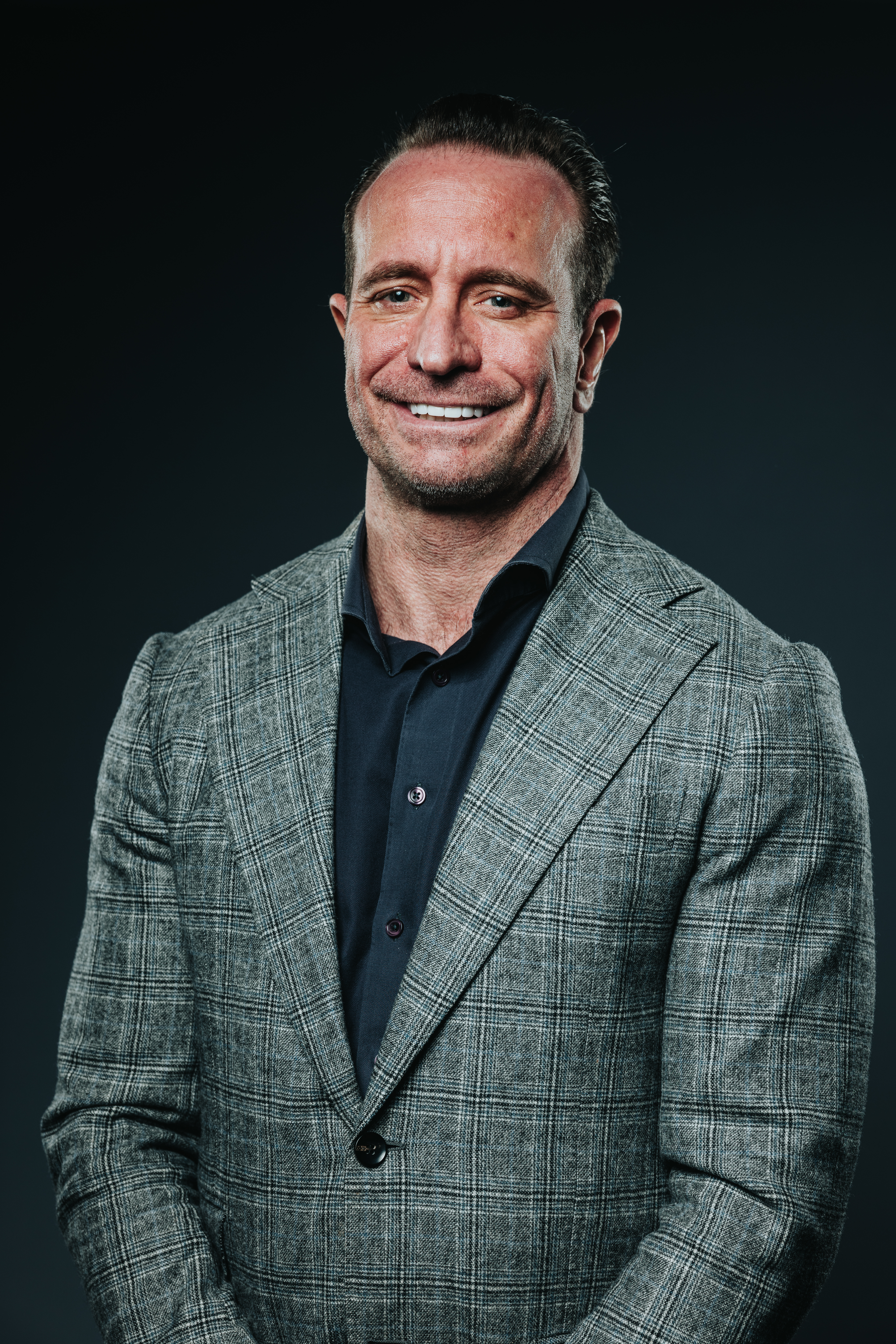
- Sauerland in 2024
- Born: 14 April 1977 (age 49); Wuppertal, West Germany
- Known for: Boxing promotion
- Title: Global Head of Boxing of MF Pro; Co-president of Misfits Boxing
- Father: Wilfried Sauerland
- Website: wassermanboxing.com

Karl-Robin Sauerland (born 14 April 1977) is an Anglo-German boxing promoter who is the Global Head of Boxing at MF Pro and the co-president at Misfits Boxing. He has been the promoter for many British boxers including David Haye, Chris Eubank Jr and Derek Chisora.

== Early life ==
Sauerland was born in Wuppertal, West Germany but grew up in London, England. He is the son of Wilfried Sauerland, a German International Hall of Fame boxing promoter.

== Career ==
Sauerland began his career as an intern at International Management Group, a sports rights agency, where he handled the commercial rights for around 300 footballers including Zlatan Ibrahimović, Teddy Sheringham and Paolo Maldini.

In 2003, Sauerland launched his own sports agency, Kentaro, which went on to acquire the broadcast rights to the Greek football team ahead of its UEFA Euro 2004 win and represent the Brazilian football team.

In 2008, Sauerland joined Sauerland Event, the boxing promotion company founded by his father Wilifred Sauerland.

In 2009, Sauerland launched the Super Six World Boxing Classic, which saw the six best super middleweights compete against each other in a single tournament. It was covered by US television channel Showtime and saw Andre Ward beat Carl Froch in the final to unify the WBC, WBA and Ring Magazine titles.

In July 2011, Sauerland promoted the world heavyweight title fight between David Haye and Wladimir Klitschko.

In March 2017, Sauerland was appointed Chief Boxing Officer at the Swiss company Comosa AG, where he launched the World Boxing Super Series. Described as the ‘Champions League of boxing’, the tournament launched with $38 million in prize money. The first season culminated in Oleksandr Usyk becoming undisputed cruiserweight world champion and Callum Smith becoming unified super middleweight champion.

In March 2021, Wasserman acquired Sauerland's promotion firm Team Sauerland to create Wasserman Boxing. Sauerland and his brother Nisse were appointed heads of global boxing. Since launch, Wasserman Boxing has promoted fights on Sky Sports, Sky Sports Box Office, DAZN and Channel 5.

In 2022, Wasserman Boxing, KSI and Proper Loud launched Misfits Boxing, a crossover boxing promotion where celebrities and influencers compete in the boxing ring, including Logan Paul, Tommy Fury and Dillon Danis. In January 2023, Misfits Boxing signed a five-year deal with DAZN to broadcast all Misfits Boxing events.

== Personal life ==
Sauerland lives in London and supports Tottenham Hotspur F.C. Sauerland has a brother, Nisse Sauerland, who is the Managing Executive of Global Boxing at Wasserman.
