= Most Valuable Promotions =

American combat sports promotion

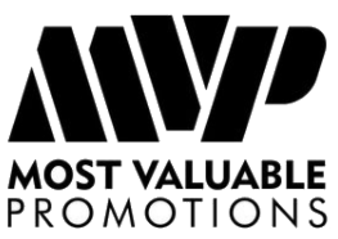
- Type: Private
- Industry: Sports promotion
- Founded: 2021; 5 years ago
- Founder: Jake Paul; Nakisa Bidarian
- Headquarters: San Juan
- Key people: Jake Paul (Co-founder and fighter); Nakisa Bidarian (Co-founder); John Martin (CEO)
- Divisions: MVP MMA; MVPW
- Subsidiaries: Professional Fighters League; Bellator MMA
- Website: mostvaluablepromotions.com

Most Valuable Promotions (MVP) is a boxing and mixed martial arts (MMA) promotion company, established in 2021 by American boxer and influencer Jake Paul and his adviser Nakisa Bidarian. MVP primarily focuses on boxing events and athlete management and are most famous for co-promoting the Amanda Serrano vs. Katie Taylor trilogy in partnership with Matchroom Boxing, as well as hosting the Jake Paul vs. Mike Tyson bout individually.

== History ==
In 2021, the promotion completed its first signing, with Puerto Rican boxer and seven-division world champion Amanda Serrano joining their stable.

Katie Taylor vs. Amanda Serrano, promoted by MVP with Eddie Hearn's Matchroom Boxing which was billed as "For History", took place in 2022 and was the first women's boxing match to headline Madison Square Garden. According to DAZN and Reuters it was the 'biggest women's fight of all time'. Among the most significant events of the year, the fight was awarded Fight of the Year by Sports Illustrated and Event of the Year by The Ring.

MVP and DAZN announced in 2023 a series of new events named 'Most Valuable Prospects' that would see up-and-coming boxers headlining DAZN events without pay-per-view. The first event was streamed on the 26th of May and it took place in the Caribe Royale Orlando in Orlando, Florida with a fight featuring Ashton Sylve against Adam Kipenga being the main event. Sylve won the fight against Kipenga by unanimous decision.

In 2024, MVP, with Netflix, promoted Jake Paul vs. Mike Tyson at the AT&T Stadium in Arlington, Texas. Paul emerged as the winner with a unanimous decision, with 65 million simultaneous viewers. The fight drew some criticism due to the significant age difference. The 31-year age difference between Tyson and Paul is the largest age difference in professional boxing history, much larger than the previous record of 24 years between Mike DiBiase (25) and Archie Moore (49), with Tyson being 58 and Paul 27 years old respectively at the time of the fight. Another point of criticism was how viewers watching on Netflix were met by "buffering issues", preventing many from watching.

The co-feature of the 2024 card was the Katie Taylor vs. Amanda Serrano rematch for the WBA, WBC, IBF, WBO, and The Ring female light-welterweight titles, with Taylor winning by unanimous decision and retaining the title, however there was some controversy post-fight as Serrano accused Taylor of intentionally headbutting her during the fight. Taylor was deducted a point in the eighth round after previous warnings from the referee for headbutts. Later however, Serrano retracted her accusation, tweeting "In no way should I ever had said she did it purposely, it's her style that makes for them." Taylor's responded by saying "I certainly wasn't fighting dirty. It gets rough in there. It was an absolute slugfest, a war."

Amanda Serrano signed a lifetime contract with MVP in March 2025. Besides competing for the promotion, Serrano would later be chairwoman of the company and look after the promotion's women's boxing initiatives. This development was prior to her next fight which was held on July 11, 2025, the latest in her trilogy against Katie Taylor. The bout took place in Madison Square Garden, and was promoted by MVP.

In April 2025, MVP also signed the 27 year old Ellie Scotney, who holds the IBF, WBO and The Ring super bantamweight titles. Scotney, undefeated as a professional with a record of 10–0, became the latest addition to MVP's women's boxing roster, which along with Serrano includes fighters such as Alycia Baumgardner and Shadasia Green. Baumgardner having signed with the promotion in March of the same year.

In August 2025, Ashton Sylve was released from his contract with MVP. This was seen as controversial by some, with Sylve himself writing "The way MVP handled this doesn’t sit right [with me]", as the release came after Sylve was knocked out by Lucas Bahdi, and only a few days after Bahdi was re-signed by MVP.

On November 17, it was announced that MVP would promote Jake Paul vs. Anthony Joshua, set to take place on December 19, 2025 at the Kaseya Center in Miami, Florida, and to be broadcast on Netflix.

=== Merger with PFL ===
In July 2026, it was announced that MVP would merge with the Professional Fighters League (PFL) organization. The new company will be backed by existing PFL investors Founding Investors 885 Capital and Knighthead Capital Management while being led by Paul and Bidarian with PFL executive John Martin still CEO. The combined company will operate under the MVP banner. In August 2026, former PFL CEO John Martin stated on The Ariel Helwani Show that the merger was complete, and that he's officially the CEO for the post-merger MVP company.

== List of events ==
=== Boxing ===
No.	Event	Headline	Date	Location	Ref
1	Paul vs. Woodley	Jake Paul vs Tyron Woodley	August 29, 2021	Rocket Mortgage Fieldhouse, Cleveland, Ohio, U.S.	
2	Paul vs. Woodley II: Leave No Doubt	Jake Paul vs Tyron Woodley	December 18, 2021	Amalie Arena, Tampa, Florida, U.S.	
3 (Note: Co-promoted with Matchroom Boxing.)	Taylor vs. Serrano: For History	Katie Taylor vs Amanda Serrano	April 30, 2022	Madison Square Garden, New York City, New York, U.S.	
—	Paul vs. Rahman Jr.	Jake Paul vs. Hasim Rahman Jr.	Cancelled (Note: The event was cancelled due to Rahman Jr. failing to make weight.)	Madison Square Garden, New York City, New York, U.S.	NA
4	Paul vs. Silva	Jake Paul vs Anderson Silva	October 29, 2022	Desert Diamond Arena, Glendale, Arizona, U.S.	
5	Paul vs Fury: The Truth	Jake Paul vs. Tommy Fury	February 26, 2023	Diriyah Arena, Diriyah, Saudi Arabia	
6	Most Valuable Prospects 1	Ashton Sylve vs. Adam Kipenga	May 26, 2023	Caribe Royale Orlando, Orlando, Florida, U.S.	
7	Paul vs. Diaz: Ready 4 War	Jake Paul vs. Nate Diaz	August 5, 2023	American Airlines Center, Dallas, Texas, U.S.	
8	Most Valuable Prospects 2	Nestor Bravo vs. Will Madera	August 18, 2023	Caribe Royale Orlando, Orlando, Florida, U.S.	
9	Most Valuable Prospects 3	Amanda Serrano vs. Danila Ramos	October 27, 2023	Caribe Royale Orlando, Orlando, Florida, U.S.	
10	Most Valuable Prospects 4	Jake Paul vs. Andre August	December 15, 2023	Caribe Royale Orlando, Orlando, Florida, U.S.	
11	Most Valuable Prospects 5	Ashton Sylve vs. Estivan Falcao	February 2, 2024	Caribe Royale Orlando, Orlando, Florida, U.S.	
12	Serrano vs. Meinke	Amanda Serrano vs. Nina Meinke	March 2, 2024	José Miguel Agrelot Coliseum, San Juan, Puerto Rico	
13	Most Valuable Prospects 6	Yoenis Tellez vs. Joseph Jackson	April 26, 2024	Caribe Royale Orlando, Orlando, Florida, U.S.	
14	Paul vs. Perry: Fear No Man	Jake Paul vs. Mike Perry	July 20, 2024	Amalie Arena, Tampa, Florida, U.S.	
15	Most Valuable Prospects 7	Jan Paul Rivera vs. Justin Goodson	July 26, 2024	Caribe Royale Orlando, Orlando, Florida, U.S.	
16	Most Valuable Prospects 8	Kevin Brown vs. John Bauza	September 6, 2024	Caribe Royale Orlando, Orlando, Florida, U.S.	
17	Most Valuable Prospects 9	Jan Paul Rivera vs Andy Beltran	October 11, 2024	Caribe Royale Orlando, Orlando, Florida, U.S.	
18	Paul vs. Tyson	Jake Paul vs. Mike Tyson	November 15, 2024	AT&T Stadium, Arlington, Texas, U.S.	
19	Most Valuable Prospects 10	Antonio Vargas vs. Winston Guerrero	December 13, 2024	Caribe Royale Orlando, Orlando, Florida, U.S.	
20	Most Valuable Prospects 11	Lucas Bahdi vs. Ryan James Racaza	March 7, 2025	Toronto Casino Resort, Toronto, Canada	
21	Most Valuable Prospects 12	Dainier Pero vs. Cesar Navarro	May 9, 2025	Caribe Royale Orlando, Orlando, Florida, U.S.	
22	Paul vs. Chávez Jr.	Jake Paul vs. Julio César Chávez Jr.	June 28, 2025	Honda Center, Anaheim, California, U.S.	
23	Taylor vs. Serrano III: Open Workout	Krystal Rosado vs. Agustina Vazquez	July 8, 2025	World Trade Center station, New York City, New York, U.S.	
23	Taylor vs. Serrano III: Greatness Demands a Trilogy	Amanda Serrano vs. Katie Taylor	July 11, 2025	Madison Square Garden, New York City, New York, U.S.	
24	Most Valuable Prospects 14	Jan Paul Rivera vs. Daniel Bailel	August 22, 2025	Caribe Royale Orlando, Orlando, Florida, U.S.	
25	MVP Fight Night: Rivera vs. Cordova	Yankiel Rivera vs. Angelino Cordova	August 23, 2025	Caribe Royale Orlando, Orlando, Florida, U.S.	
26	Most Valuable Prospects 15	Sol Cudos vs. Kim Clavel	September 27, 2025	Théâtre Saint-Denis, Montreal, Canada	
27	Most Valuable Prospects 16	Lourdes Juárez vs. Yesica Nery Plata	October 18, 2025	South Padre Island Convention Centre, South Padre Island, Texas, U.S.	
—	MVP Showcase	Jahmal Harvey vs. Kevin Cervantes	Cancelled	Seminole Hard Rock Hotel and Casino, Hollywood, Florida, U.S.	
—	Paul vs. Davis	Jake Paul vs. Gervonta Davis	Cancelled	Kaseya Center, Miami, Florida, U.S.	
28	MVP Showcase 2	Luan Medeiros vs. Hugo Macias	December 16, 2025	LIV Miami, Miami, Florida, U.S.	
29	Paul vs. Joshua: Judgment Day	Jake Paul vs. Anthony Joshua	December 19, 2025	Kaseya Center, Miami, Florida, U.S.	
30	Serrano vs. Cruz 2	Amanda Serrano vs. Erika Cruz	January 3, 2026	Roberto Clemente Coliseum, San Juan, Puerto Rico	
31	MVPW-01: Dubois vs. Harper	Caroline Dubois vs. Terri Harper	April 5, 2026	Olympia London, London, England	
31	MVPW-02: Baumgardner vs. Shin	Alycia Baumgardner vs. Bo Mi Re Shin	April 17, 2026	Madison Square Garden, New York City, New York, U.S.	
32	MVPW-03: Han vs. Holm II	Stephanie Han vs. Holly Holm	May 30, 2026	El Paso County Coliseum, El Paso, Texas, U.S.	
33	MVPW-04: Jones vs. Carranza II	Oshae Jones vs. Elia Carranza	June 13, 2026	Caribe Royale Orlando, Orlando, Florida, U.S.	
34	MVPW-05: Johnson vs. Thorslund	Dina Thorslund vs. Cherneka Johnson	August 8, 2026	Caribe Royale Orlando, Orlando, Florida, U.S.	
35	Serrano vs. Manzur	Amanda Serrano vs. Lucrecia Manzur	August 21, 2026	Pechanga Resort & Casino, Temecula, California, U.S.	
36	MVPW-06: Mayer vs. Cameron	Mikaela Mayer vs. Chantelle Cameron	August 29, 2026	bp pulse LIVE, Birmingham, England	
37 (Note: Co-promoted with Golden Boy Promotions.)	Schofield vs. Bahdi	Floyd Schofield vs. Lucas Bahdi	October 10, 2026	Wintrust Arena, Chicago, Illinois, U.S.	
38	MVPW-07: Turhan vs. Baumgardner	Elif Nur Turhan vs. Alycia Baumgardner	November 8, 2026	College Park Center, Arlington, Texas, U.S.	
39	Paul vs. Doumbé: An MVP Christmas Eve Special	Jake Paul vs. Cédric Doumbé	December 24, 2026	Coca-Cola Arena, Dubai, U.A.E.	
40	Serrano vs. Falzon: The Last Walk	Amanda Serrano vs. Skye Falzon	January 9, 2027	Coliseo Jose Miguel Agrelot, San Juan, Puerto Rico	
41 (Note: Co-promoted with Indian Pro Boxing League.)	Goyat vs. Pettis	Neeraj Goyat vs. Anthony Pettis	January 23, 2027	TBA, India	
42	MVP-09: Dubois vs. Han	Caroline Dubois vs. Stephanie Han	February 20, 2027	TBA, El Paso, Texas, U.S.	

=== MMA ===
No.	Event	Headline	Date	Location	Ref
1	MVP MMA: Rousey vs. Carano	Ronda Rousey vs. Gina Carano	May 16, 2026	Intuit Dome, Inglewood, California, U.S.	

== Current stable ==
Boxer	Nationality	Weight	Record	Title
Ramla Ali	(Somalia) (United Kingdom) Somali-British	Super bantamweight	10–2 (2 KOs)	
Jasmine Artiga	(United States) American	Super flyweight	13–0–1 (6 KOs)	WBA female super flyweight champion
Lucas Bahdi	(Canada) Canadian	Lightweight	19–0 (15 KOs)	
Alycia Baumgardner	(United States) American	Super Featherweight	15–1 (7 KOs)	WBC, IBO female super featherweight, WBO, IBF, and The Ring female super featherweight undisputed champion since February 4, 2023.
Ebanie Bridges	(Australia) Australian	Bantamweight, Super bantamweight	9–2 (4 KOs)	
Chantelle Cameron	(United Kingdom) British	Super lightweight	21–1 (8 KOs)	WBC interim female super lightweight champion.
Alexis Chaparro	(Puerto Rico) Puerto Rican	Middleweight	4–0 (4 KOs)	
Kim Clavel	(Canada) Canadian	Light-flyweight	21–2 (3 KOs)	
Shannon Courtenay	(United Kingdom) British	Bantamweight, Super-bantamweight	9–3 (3 KOs)	
Caroline Dubois	(United Kingdom) British	Lightweight	11–0–1 (5 KOs)	WBC female lightweight champion
Natalie Dove	(United States) American	Super flyweight	5–0–1 (1 KO)	
Tysie Gallagher	(United Kingdom) British	Super bantamweight	10–2 (0 KOs)	
Amanda Galle	(Canada) Canadian	Bantamweight	11–0–1 (1 KO)	IBO female bantamweight champion.
Neeraj Goyat	(India) Indian	Welterweight	19–2–4 (8 KOs)	
Shadasia Green	(United States) American	Super Middleweight	15–1 (11 KOs)	WBO World Super Middleweight World Champion.
Alexander Gueche	(United States) American	Bantamweight	8–0 (5 KOs)	
Stephanie Han	(United States) American	Bantamweight	10–0 (3 KOs)	WBA female lightweight champion.
Terri Harper	(United Kingdom) British	Super featherweight, Lightweight, Welterweight, Light middleweight	16–2–2 (6 KOs)	World Boxing Organization female lightweight champion.
Mizuki Hiruta	(Japan) Japanese	Super flyweight, Flyweight	11–0 (2 KOs)	World Boxing Organization female super flyweight champion.
Jahmal Harvey	(United States) American	Featherweight	0–0 (0 KOs)	
Keno Marley	(Brazil) Brazilian	Heavyweight	0–0 (0 KOs)	
Shurretta Metcalf	(United States) American	Bantamweight	14–5–1 (1) (2 KOs)	
Jessica Nery Plata	(Mexico) Mexican	Flyweight, Light flyweight	30–2 (3 KOs)	WBA and WBC World female light-flyweight champion
Jully Poca	(Brazil) Brazilian	Super lightweight	1–1 (0 KOs)	
Jake Paul	(United States) American	Cruiserweight	12–2 (7 KOs)	
Jan Paul Rivera	(Puerto Rico) Puerto Rican	Featherweight	11–0 (6 KOs)	
Yankiel Rivera	(Puerto Rico) Puerto Rican	Flyweight	7–0 (3 KOs)	
Desley Robinson	(Australia) Australian	Middleweight, Light heavyweight	10–3 (3 KOs)	IBF and WBO female middleweight champion
Krystal Rosado	(Puerto Rico) Puerto Rican	Bantamweight	7–0 (2 KOs)	
Ellie Scotney	(United Kingdom) British	Super bantamweight	10–0 (0 KOs)	IBF, WBO and Ring Magazine super-bantamweight World champion.
Amanda Serrano	(Puerto Rico) Puerto Rican	Super Lightweight	47–4-1 (31 KOs)	WBA, IBO, WBO unified featherweight world champion.
Tammara Thibeault	(Canada) Canadian	Middleweight	3–0 (2 KO)	
Dina Thorslund	(Denmark) Danish	Bantamweight	23–0 (9 KOs)	
Naomy Valle	(Costa Rica) Costa Rican	Light flyweight	14–0 (9 KOs)	
Yokasta Valle	(Costa Rica) Costa Rican	Atomweight, Mini-flyweight, Light-flyweight, Flyweight	33–3 (10 KOs)	WBC female mini-flyweight champion
Javon Walton	(United States) American	Featherweight	2–0–1 (1 KO)	

== Former talent ==
Boxer	Nationality	Weight	Record At Time of Release	Title	Date Released
Ashton "H2O" Sylve	(United States) American	Lightweight	11–1 (9 KO wins, 1 KO loss)		August, 2025

== See also ==
- Jake Paul vs. Ben Askren
- KSI vs Jake Paul
- Misfits Boxing
