= KSI vs Jake Paul =

Proposed professional YouTube boxing match

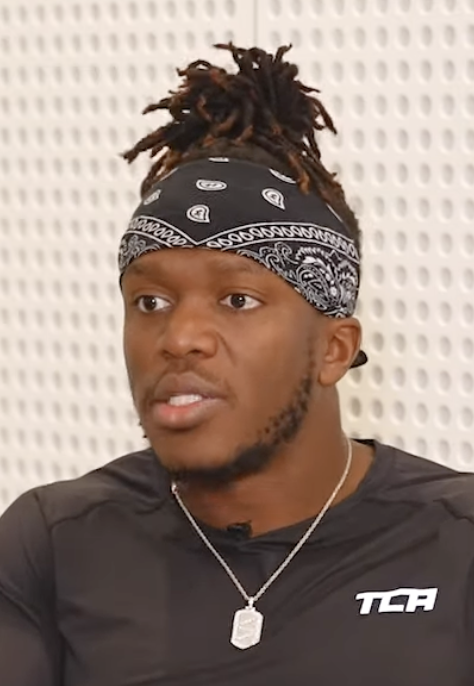
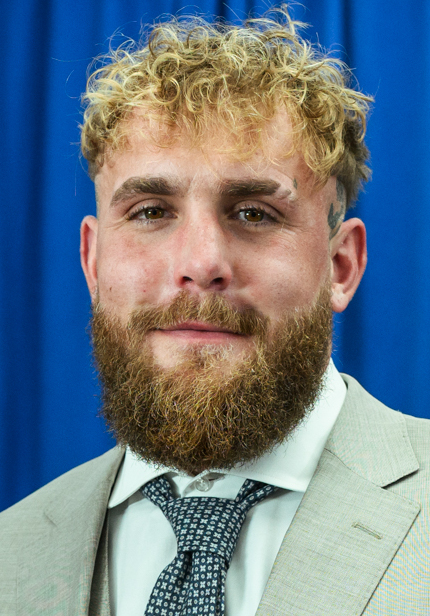
- Venue: Wembley Stadium, London, England

Tale of the tape
Boxer	KSI	Jake Paul
Nickname	"The Nightmare"	"El Gallo De Dorado"
Hometown	Watford, England	Cleveland, Ohio, U.S.
Pre-fight record	4–1 (1) (3 KOs) (Note: On BoxRec, KSI's professional record is 1–1 and his MF-professional record is 3–0–0–1 (3 KOs).)	12–2 (7 KOs)
Height	5 ft 11 in (180 cm)	6 ft 1 in (185 cm)
Style	Orthodox	Orthodox
Recognition	Former MFB cruiserweight champion	WBA; No. 14 Ranked Cruiserweight

KSI vs Jake Paul was a proposed professional crossover boxing match that was going to be contested between YouTubers KSI and Jake Paul.

== Background ==
=== 2018–2019: KSI's initial call out of Paul ===
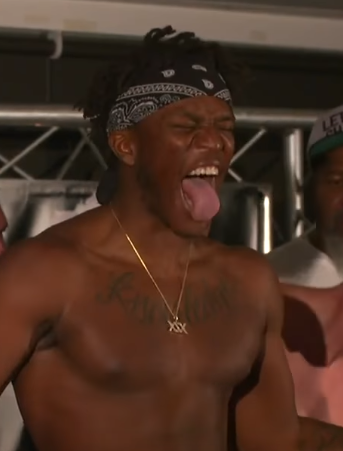
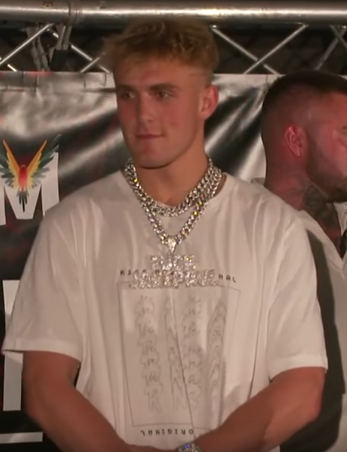
KSI and Paul in August 2018 ahead of their double billed bout against Logan Paul and Deji

On 3 February 2018, KSI fought fellow YouTuber Joe Weller at the Copper Box Arena in London, defeating him via technical knockout in the 3rd round. On the night, KSI called out Jake Paul, his older brother Logan Paul, and retired footballer Rio Ferdinand. After constant back and forth, it was scheduled that KSI would fight Logan Paul and Jake Paul would fight Deji Olatunji, KSI's younger brother, at Manchester Arena in Manchester, England on 25 August. On the night, Jake Paul won via technical knockout in the 5th round and KSI vs Logan Paul ended in a majority draw. On 9 November 2019, a professional rematch was held at the Staples Center in Los Angeles in which KSI defeated Logan Paul via split decision.

=== 2020–2021: Paul's professional debut and COVID-19 pandemic ===
On 30 January 2020, Paul made his professional debut against fellow YouTuber AnEsonGib as the co-feature to the WBO world middleweight title bout between professional boxers Demetrius Andrade and Luke Keeler, in which he won via technical knockout in the 1st round. After the fight, KSI and Paul exchanged words on stage. KSI and Paul were then expected to face each other. However on 23 March, Prime Minister Boris Johnson announced the first national lockdown in the United Kingdom in response to the COVID-19 pandemic which prevented KSI from being able to train for the bout. In the United States however, the restrictions were not as severe, thus allowing Paul to continue his boxing career.

On 28 November, Paul fought and defeated retired NBA player Nate Robinson via knockout in the 2nd round. On 17 April 2021, Paul defeated retired professional mixed martial artists in Ben Askren via knockout in the 1st round. Paul then faced retired professional mixed martial artists Tyron Woodley twice. Once on 29 August, defeating him via split decision and second, on 18 December via knockout in the 6th round.

=== 2022–2023: KSI's return to boxing and Tommy Fury intervention ===
On 27 August 2022, KSI returned to boxing after a three year hiatus in an MF–professional bout. Originally, KSI was scheduled to face fellow YouTuber Alex Wassabi, but was cancelled after Wassabi sustained a concussion. Paul immediately took it to Twitter to call out KSI and offer him as his Wassabi's replacement. KSI declined his offer. On 8 August however, KSI tweeted an offer to Paul stating that they will fight in 2023 at Wembley Stadium with the winner taking 100% of the purse made from the event. Paul accepted the deal. On the night, KSI fought and defeated rapper Swarmz via knockout in the 2nd round and professional boxer Luis Alcaraz Pineda via knockout in the 3rd round.

On 14 January 2023, KSI fought and defeated Brazilian YouTuber FaZe Temperrr via knockout in the 1st round and immediately called out Paul. On 26 February, Paul fought professional boxer Tommy Fury in Saudi Arabia and lost via split decision. After the bout, KSI's manager and Misfits Boxing co-president Mams Taylor, revealed that Paul's team had decided that they no longer wish to have a bout with KSI in August, instead choosing a bout with Nate Diaz, in which he won via unanimous decision. On 13 May, KSI fought professional boxer Joe Fournier and originally won via a controversial knockout in the 2nd round, but was later overruled to a no contest due to an unintentional elbow strike. After the bout, KSI shared a stare down with Paul's former opponent Fury. On 14 October, KSI fought Paul's former opponent Fury, and lost via unanimous decision. On 16 December, both KSI and Paul were active. Paul fought and defeated professional boxer Andre August via knockout in the 1st round while KSI and fellow YouTuber IShowSpeed held a charity spar for the Anthony Walker Foundation at the exact same time.

=== 2024–2026: Stalemate and KSI's retirement ===
In 2024, Paul was scheduled to face former undisputed heavyweight champion Mike Tyson on 20 July but was postponed due Tyson suffering from a ulcer flare up. On 1 June, Paul called out KSI on Twitter to step in for Tyson. KSI responded by stating he has a bout scheduled in August and offers to fight in December. Paul then leaked KSI was in negotiations to fight former unified light welterweight champion Amir Khan, and offered to fight Khan in February 2025 if he emerged victorious. Paul then offered KSI a fight in February at 200 Ibs at Madison Square Garden. KSI responded demanding the fight takes place in December at 185 Ibs. The following day on 2 June, Mams Taylor confirmed that Paul will be receiving a contract for either December or February at 185 Ibs. On 8 June, KSI uploaded a YouTube video proposing one final offer to Paul for May 2025 at 185 Ibs with the option to have the bout take place in the US rather than England. However, Paul's adviser and Most Valuable Promotions co-president Nakisa Bidarian stated that Paul is booked for May, and suggested February again. Taylor responded to Bidarian and accepted the offer. On 17 June however, Taylor confirmed that team Paul have been "radio silence" in negotiations.

On 10 January 2026, in an interview with Ranveer Allahbadia, KSI claimed that he was "done with boxing" and had even turned down deals to fight Jake Paul that were up to $30 million. However during a 28 February interview with Heart, KSI stated that he wasn't retired from boxing but was "on a break". In a May 2026 interview with Ariel Helwani, Paul claimed that his boxing career was "most definitely" in doubt due to the jaw injuries that he suffered in his knockout loss to Anthony Joshua in December 2025, though he later claimed he will be medically cleared for sparring in two-to-three months. On 10 October, KSI officially announced his retirement from boxing, ending any possibility of the bout happening.

== See also ==
- List of celebrity boxing matches
- List of influencer boxing matches
- Misfits Boxing
- Most Valuable Promotions

Preceded by vs Tommy Fury	KSI's bouts	Succeeded by TBD
Preceded by vs Julio César Chávez Jr.	Jake Paul's bouts	Succeeded by vs Gervonta Davis
