= Stephanie Han =

American boxer (born 1990)

Personal information
- Nickname: The Enforcer
- Born: October 29, 1990 (age 36) El Paso, Texas, U.S.
- Height: 5 ft 7 1/2 in (171 cm)
- Weight: Lightweight

Boxing career
- Stance: Orthodox

Boxing record
- Total fights: 13
- Wins: 13
- Win by KO: 3

Stephanie Han (born October 29, 1990) is an American professional boxer. She has held the WBA female lightweight title since February 2025.

== Early life ==
Han is one of five children born to an ethnic Korean father, Bae Hyun Han, who owned a martial arts studio.

== Professional career ==
=== WBA lightweight champion ===
==== Han vs. Terlep ====
Han turned professional in 2021 and compiled a record of 9–0, before knocking out Hannah Terlep in the first round of their fight on 22 February 2025, to win the vacant WBA female lightweight title.

==== Signing with Most Valuable Promotions ====
In June 2025, Han signed a promotional contract with Most Valuable Promotions.

==== Han vs. Angel ====
She made the first defense of her title against Paulina Ángel at the Caribe Royale Resort in Orlando, Florida, on 23 August 2025. After recovering from being knocked to the canvas in the first round, Han went on to win by unanimous decision.

==== Han vs. Holm ====
Han made the second defense of her title against Holly Holm at Coliseo Roberto Clemente in San Juan, Puerto Rico, on 3 January 2026. She won by unanimous technical decision having been ahead on all three ringside judges' scorecards when the fight was stopped in the seventh round due to a cut on her opponent's hairline caused by an accidental clash of heads.

==== Han vs. Holm II ====
Han defended her WBA lightweight title against Holly Holm in a rematch at County Coliseum in El Paso, Texas, on 30 May 2026. She won via majority decision decision with two of the ringside judges scoring the fight 96–94 in her favour, while the third had it a 95–95 draw.

== Personal life ==
Han's sister Jennifer is also a professional boxer. Outside of boxing, she works as a police officer for the El Paso Police Department. She has two children.

== Professional boxing record ==
13 fights	13 wins	0 losses
By knockout	3	0
By decision	10	0

No.	Result	Record	Opponent	Type	Round, time	Date	Location	Notes
13	Win	13–0	Holly Holm	MD	10	2026-05-30	El Paso County Coliseum, El Paso, Texas, U.S.	Retained WBA female lightweight title
12	Win	12–0	Holly Holm	TD	7 (10), 1:44	2026-01-03	Coliseo Roberto Clemente, San Juan, Puerto Rico	Retained WBA female lightweight title
11	Win	11–0	Paulina Ángel	UD	10	2025-08-23	Caribe Royale Resort, Orlando, Florida, U.S.	Retained WBA female lightweight title
10	Win	10–0	Hannah Terlep	KO	1 (10)	2025-02-22	El Paso County Coliseum, El Paso, Texas, U.S.	Won vacant WBA female lightweight title
9	Win	9–0	Miranda Reyes	UD	8 (8)	2024-07-27	El Paso County Coliseum, El Paso, Texas, U.S.	Won vacant WBA International lightweight title
8	Win	8–0	Michaele Nogue	UD	6 (6)	2024-05-10	Live! Casino, Philadelphia, Pennsylvania, U.S.	
7	Win	7–0	Wendellin Cruz	UD	8 (8)	2024-04-05	Wind Creek Bethlehem, Bethlehem, Pennsylvania, U.S.	
6	Win	6–0	Nikola Izova	KO	1 (6)	2024-03-01	El Paso County Coliseum, El Paso, Texas, U.S.	
5	Win	5–0	Simone Aparecida da Silva	UD	8 (8)	2023-11-03	El Paso County Coliseum, El Paso, Texas, U.S.	
4	Win	4–0	Kim Colbert	TKO	1 (4)	2023-03-10	El Paso Convention Center, El Paso, Texas, U.S.	
3	Win	3–0	Estefania Reyes Argueta	UD	4 (4)	2023-02-25	San Pedro Cholula, Mexico	
2	Win	2–0	Destiny Jones	UD	4 (4)	2022-08-12	Pan American Center, Las Cruces, New Mexico, U.S.	
1	Win	1–0	Isabel Garcia	UD	4 (4)	2021-10-30	Pan American Center, Las Cruces, New Mexico, U.S.	

== See also ==
- List of female boxers
- List of Korean Americans
- Notable boxing families
- List of WBA female world champions

Sporting positions
Regional boxing titles
New title	WBA International lightweight champion July 27, 2024 – February 22, 2025; Won world title	Vacant
World boxing titles
Vacant Title last held by Katie Taylor	WBA lightweight champion February 22, 2025 – present	Incumbent
