= DaCarree Scott =

American heavyweight boxer

Personal information
- Nickname: Mac Truck
- Nationality: American
- Born: July 8, 1998 (age 28) Denver, Colorado, U.S.
- Height: 5 ft 10 in (1.78 m)
- Weight: Heavyweight

Boxing career

Boxing record
- Total fights: 10
- Wins: 9
- Win by KO: 8
- Losses: 1
- Draws: 0
- No contests: 0
Medal record
Men's amateur boxing
Event	1st	2nd	3rd
U.S. National Championships	0	1	0
Western Elite Qualifier	0	1	0
Golden Gloves	2	0	0
Total	2	2	0
Men's amateur boxing
Representing United States
U.S. National Championships
Silver medal – second place	U.S. Nationals	Super heavyweight
Western Elite Qualifier
Silver medal – second place	2019 Reno	Super heavyweight
Golden Gloves
Gold medal – first place	State championship	Super heavyweight
Gold medal – first place	Regional championship	Super heavyweight

DaCarree Scott (born July 8, 1998), known by the nickname Mac Truck, is an American professional boxer who competes in the heavyweight division. He held the NABA Gold heavyweight title in 2022. The World Boxing Association ranked him No. 14 in the world at heavyweight in its official May 2022 ratings.

== Early life ==
Scott was born in Denver, Colorado, and later based his boxing career in the Atlanta metropolitan area. He began boxing at eight years old after being introduced to the sport by his mother, who had also boxed recreationally. As a youth, he additionally participated in football, basketball and soccer before concentrating on boxing.

== Amateur career ==
Scott competed in the super-heavyweight division as an amateur. A 2021 profile published by BoxingTalk credited him with a 35-bout amateur career, a silver medal at the U.S. Nationals and participation in the 2019 United States Olympic qualifying cycle.

Scott's amateur record includes victories over future professional heavyweights Leonid Grachev and Pryce Taylor. At the 2019 Western Elite Qualifier in Reno, Nevada, Scott defeated Grachev by unanimous decision and defeated Taylor by split decision before losing the final to Jeremiah Milton. Earlier that year, Scott lost an amateur bout to future professional light-heavyweight Najee Lopez.

Scott's runner-up finish at the Western Elite Qualifier qualified him for the 2020 U.S. Olympic Team Trials for Boxing. At the trials in Lake Charles, Louisiana, in December 2019, he lost his opening bout by decision. Scott turned professional in 2020.

== Professional career ==
=== Early career ===
Scott made his professional debut on February 29, 2020, stopping Gary Kelly in the second round in Atlanta. He won his first six professional contests by stoppage, with five of the six ending in the opening round. His sixth victory came against Jaden Booth on July 16, 2021, when Scott ended the bout with an overhand right after 42 seconds.

=== NABA Gold heavyweight title ===
On January 29, 2022, Scott faced Ahmed Hefny for the vacant NABA Gold heavyweight title at Packard Music Hall in Warren, Ohio on the undercard for Ilunga Junior Makabu vs Thabiso Mchunu for the WBC Cruiserweight Championship. Entering the bout, Scott had completed only seven professional rounds. He went the ten-round distance for the first time and won by split decision. Two judges scored the bout 96–94 and 97–93 for Scott, while the third scored it 96–94 for Hefny.

Scott defended the title against Jonathan Guidry on June 11, 2022, at Casino Miami Jai Alai in Miami. The bout was part of the undercard for Daniel Dubois' heavyweight title fight against Trevor Bryan.

Guidry knocked Scott out at 2:01 of the seventh round, handing Scott his first professional defeat and winning the title.

Scott weighed 253.6 pounds for the Guidry bout, compared with 276.5 pounds for his title-winning fight against Ahmed Hefny five months earlier, a reduction of 22.9 pounds. Scott later said that the weight loss followed a new dietary plan and that the substantial reduction left him with less energy and strength which contributed to his performance.

=== Return to competition ===
Scott returned on May 27, 2023, stopping Aaron Chavers at 2:40 of the fourth round in Atlanta. On March 29, 2024, he recorded another fourth-round stoppage, defeating Detrailous Webster at Overtime Elite Arena in Atlanta. The victory raised Scott's record to 9–1 with eight knockouts.

== Training camps and sparring ==
Scott has worked as a sparring partner in several prominent professional training camps. In 2020, he was part of Roy Jones Jr.'s preparation for Jones's exhibition bout against Mike Tyson. In a recorded interview from the camp, Scott discussed sparring with Jones and Jones's retained speed while preparing for the bout.

Scott later served as a sparring partner for Jake Paul during Paul's 2024 preparations for Mike Perry and Tyson. Scott told Boxing Social that he spent approximately four months in Paul's camps, initially joining before the original Paul–Tyson date, remaining in Puerto Rico for the Perry camp and returning for the rescheduled Tyson bout. Scott was selected partly because of his height and ability to reproduce Tyson's compact pressure style. The Hollywood Reporter independently observed Paul sparring Scott during an October 2024 training session and described Scott as having been selected for his Tyson-like qualities. A separate report by The Hollywood Reporter also identified Scott as Paul's sparring partner and reported that he remained in camp for the Perry bout before returning to help Paul prepare for Tyson.

In an interview with YSM Sports Media, Scott identified Daniel Dubois and Jarrell Miller as former sparring partners while discussing their scheduled professional bout.

Scott has also sparred with former cruiserweight world champion Lawrence Okolie and former heavyweight world champion Deontay Wilder. In 2026, Scott joined Wilder's training camp during preparation for Derek Chisora.

== Professional boxing record ==
10 fights	9 wins	1 loss
By knockout	8	1
By decision	1	0
By disqualification	0	0
Draws	0	
No contests	0	

No.	Result	Record	Opponent	Type	Round, time	Date	Location	Notes
10	Win	9–1	Detrailous Webster	TKO	4 (6), 2:11	March 29, 2024	Overtime Elite Arena, Atlanta, Georgia, U.S.	
9	Win	8–1	Aaron Chavers	TKO	4 (6), 2:40	May 27, 2023	The Atrium, Atlanta, Georgia, U.S.	
8	Loss	7–1	Jonathan Guidry	TKO	7 (10), 2:01	June 11, 2022	Casino Miami Jai Alai, Miami, Florida, U.S.	Lost NABA Gold heavyweight title; Bryan–Dubois undercard
7	Win	7–0	Ahmed Hefny	SD	10	January 29, 2022	Packard Music Hall, Warren, Ohio, U.S.	Won vacant NABA Gold heavyweight title
6	Win	6–0	Jaden Booth	TKO	1 (6), 0:42	July 16, 2021	Buckhead Fight Club, Atlanta, Georgia, U.S.	
5	Win	5–0	Quintell Thompson	TKO	1 (6), 3:00	April 18, 2021	Revel, Atlanta, Georgia, U.S.	
4	Win	4–0	Donald Pierce	TKO	1 (4), 3:00	December 12, 2020	Champion Boxing Gym, Jonesboro, Georgia, U.S.	
3	Win	3–0	Anthony Trotter	TKO	1 (4), 1:25	September 6, 2020	Cosmopolitan Lounge, Decatur, Georgia, U.S.	
2	Win	2–0	Richard Tucker	TKO	1 (4), 3:00	July 18, 2020	Falcons Fury Harley-Davidson, Conyers, Georgia, U.S.	
1	Win	1–0	Gary Kelly	TKO	2 (4), 0:58	February 29, 2020	Kroc Center, Atlanta, Georgia, U.S.	Professional debut

== Championships and accomplishments ==
Professional

- North American Boxing Association
  - NABA Gold heavyweight title (2022)

Amateur

- U.S. Nationals silver medalist
- 2019 Western Elite Qualifier super-heavyweight silver medalist
- 2020 U.S. Olympic Team Trials participant

Sporting positions
Preceded by Vacant	NABA Gold heavyweight champion January 29, 2022 – June 11, 2022	Succeeded by Jonathan Guidry
