= Jake Paul =

American influencer and professional boxer (born 1997)

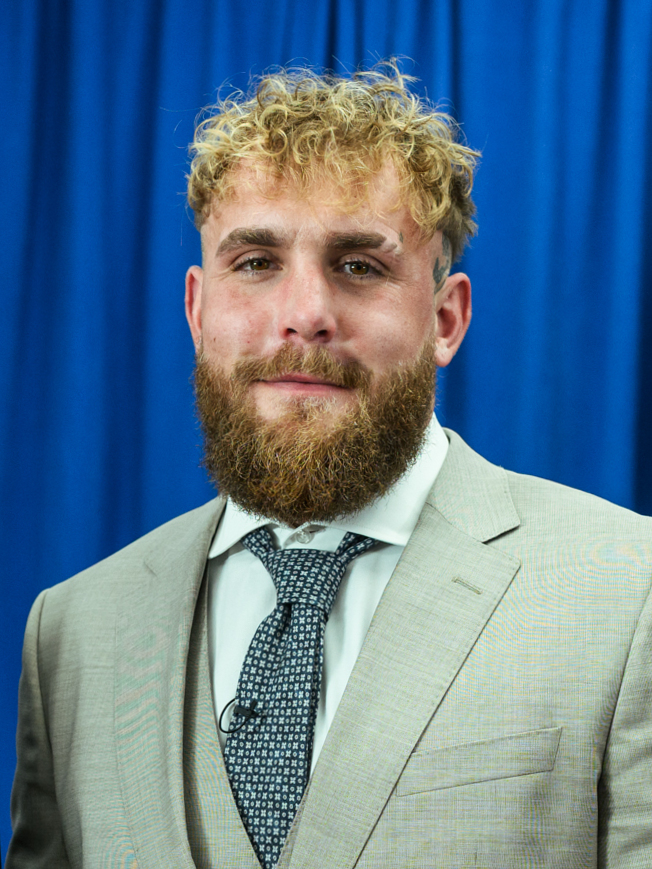
- Paul in 2026
- Born: Jake Joseph Paul; January 17, 1997 (age 29); Cleveland, Ohio, U.S.
- Occupations: Boxer; influencer; actor
- Years active: 2013–present
- Political party: Republican
- Partners: Jutta Leerdam (2023–present; engaged)
- Relatives: Logan Paul (brother)

YouTube information
- Channel: Jake Paul
- Genres: Comedy; vlog; boxing
- Subscribers: 21 million
- Views: 8.01 billion
- Last updated: August 14, 2026
- Boxing career
- Other names: The Problem Child; El Gallo De Dorado
- Height: 6 ft 1 in (185 cm)
- Weight: Cruiserweight; Heavyweight
- Reach: 76 in (193 cm)
- Stance: Orthodox

Boxing record
- Total fights: 14
- Wins: 12
- Win by KO: 7
- Losses: 2
- Jake Paul's voice On the confiscation of his nine-foot teddy bear by the TSA; Recorded December 2016

Jake Joseph Paul (born January 17, 1997) is an American professional boxer, influencer, and former actor. He began his career posting videos on Vine in September 2013 and had amassed 5.3 million followers and 2 billion views before the app was discontinued. He launched his YouTube channel, Jake Paul, in May 2014, dedicated to vlogs and was ranked by Forbes as one of the highest-paid YouTube creators of the 2010s and 2020s.

As an actor, Paul's first role in a feature film was in the 2016 film Dance Camp. He went on to star as Dirk Mann on the Disney Channel series Bizaardvark (2016–2018) and appear in the films Airplane Mode (2019), Mainstream (2020), and A Genie's Tail (2022). He has also made guest appearances in the television series Walk the Prank (2016), The Price Is Right (2017), and Ridiculousness (2020).

Paul's boxing career began in August 2018 with a white-collar boxing match against Deji Olatunji, which he won via technical knockout. His professional boxing debut was against AnEsonGib in January 2020. He later faced and defeated former basketball player Nate Robinson and former MMA fighters Ben Askren, Tyron Woodley (twice), and Anderson Silva.

In February 2023, Paul lost to Tommy Fury via split decision in his first fight with an active professional boxer. He then built a winning streak defeating Nate Diaz, Andre August, Ryan Bourland, and Mike Perry. His November 2024 bout against Mike Tyson, which he won via unanimous decision in Texas, achieved the biggest boxing gate receipts in U.S. history outside of Las Vegas. In December 2025, Paul suffered his first stoppage loss to former two-time unified world heavyweight champion Anthony Joshua. Earlier that year, Paul defeated former WBC middleweight champion Julio César Chávez Jr. by unanimous decision, which briefly earned him a top fifteen Cruiserweight ranking by the World Boxing Association.

In 2021, Paul founded Most Valuable Promotions, a boxing promotion alongside his adviser Nakisa Bidarian, and co-founded Anti Fund, a venture capital firm, with Geoffrey Woo. In 2026, The New York Times reported that Anti Fund managed $180 million after closing a $100 million growth capital fund.

== Early life ==
Paul was born on January 17, 1997, in Cleveland, Ohio, and raised in Westlake, Ohio, with his older brother Logan, who is also a YouTuber and internet personality. They started filming themselves when Jake was ten. Their parents are Pamela Ann Stepnick (née Meredith) and realtor Gregory Allan Paul. He was raised in a church-going, Christian household.

== Entertainment career ==
=== 2013–2016: Vine, YouTube, and Bizaardvark ===
Paul began his career in September 2013 posting videos on Vine. By the time Vine was discontinued by Twitter Inc., Paul had amassed 5.3 million followers and 2 billion views on the app. Paul launched his YouTube channel on May 15, 2014. His channel became known for pranks, controversies, and his hip hop music.

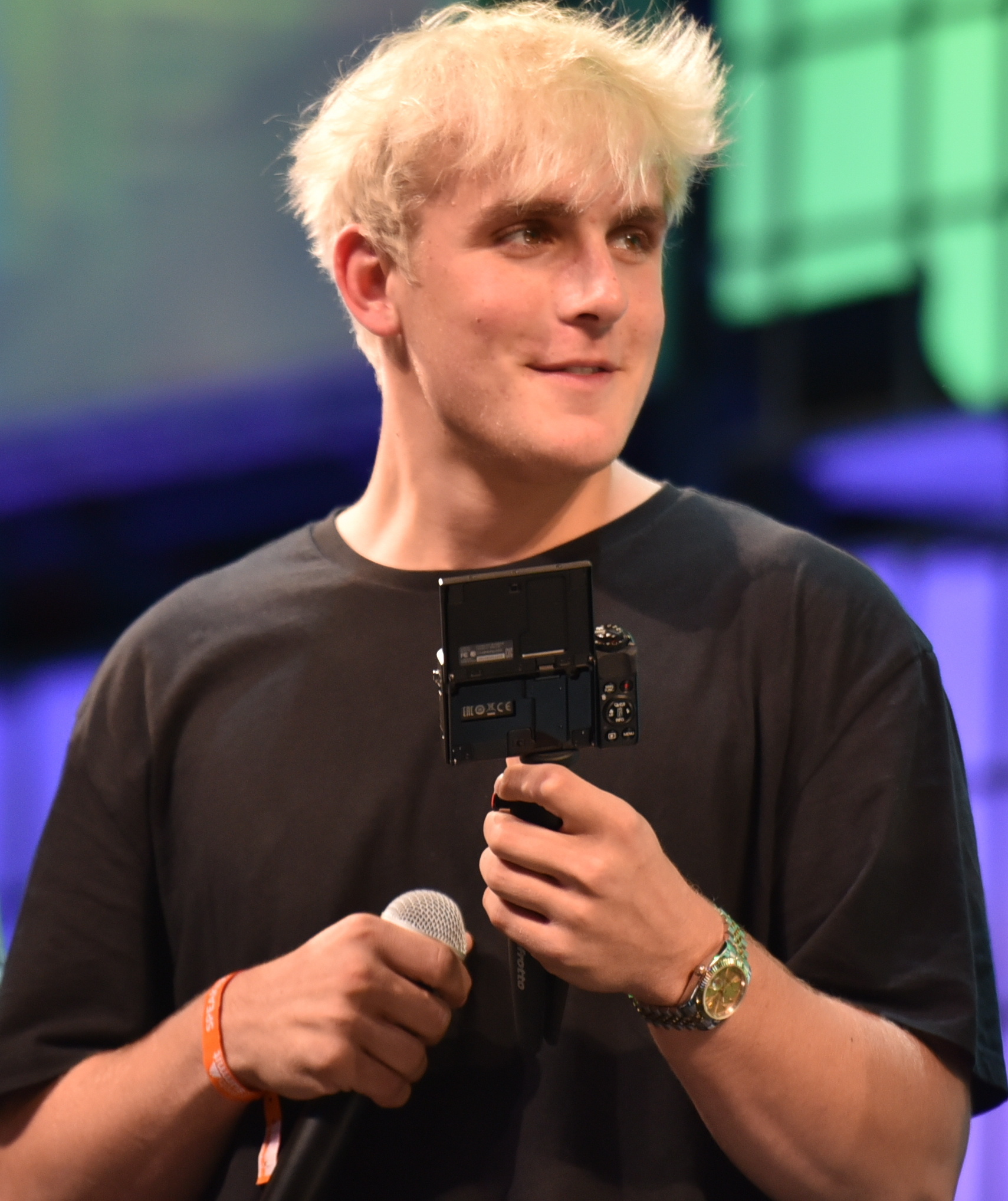
Paul at Web Summit in 2016

After gaining acclaim on Vine and YouTube, Paul joined the cast of the Disney Channel series Bizaardvark, playing a character called "Dirk Mann" who accepted dare requests to perform. On July 22, 2017, during the middle of filming the second season of Bizaardvark, the Disney Channel announced that Paul would be leaving the series. The announcement followed a news report from KTLA about public complaints from Paul's neighbors regarding the noise generated by Paul's pranks, parties, hazards and large crowds of fans congregating in their neighborhood. Paul confirmed the news on his Twitter page, saying he would now focus more on his personal brand, YouTube channel, business ventures, and more mature acting roles. Paul later claimed in an interview with The Hollywood Reporter that he was actually fired from Bizaardvark by Disney, who wanted to remove him from the show quickly, due to the controversy created from the KTLA article. The Hollywood Report claims that "For Disney, the KTLA news segment was the final straw".

=== 2017–2019: Music, business, and Team 10 ===
Paul launched entertainment collective Team 10 in 2016. On January 17, 2017, his 20th birthday, it was reported that he had launched media company TeamDom with $1 million in funding to create an influencer marketing management and creative agency around teen entertainment. Investors included Danhua Capital, Horizons Alpha, Vayner Capital, Sound Ventures & A-Grade Investments and Adam Zeplain.

Paul released the single "It's Everyday Bro", featuring Team 10, on May 30, 2017. It featured vocals from members of the team at the time, consisting of Nick Crompton, Chance Sutton, Ivan and Emilio Martinez and Tessa Brooks. It drew over 70 million views in one month and became YouTube's third most disliked video. The song debuted and peaked at number 91 on the Billboard Hot 100 and was certified platinum by the Recording Industry Association of America (RIAA). Its title refers to how Paul at the time posted a video every single day.

In 2017, Jake Paul experienced a rapid rise on YouTube, gaining 12 million subscribers over the course of the year. As the leader of Team 10, he regularly uploaded daily vlogs documenting his activities and promoted merchandise through links in his social-media profiles.

In 2017, Paul released and later deleted singles including "Ohio Fried Chicken", "Jerika", "No Competition", "That Ain't on the News" and "Litmas". The singles were deleted for various reasons, including his 2018 break-up with Erika Costell.

On November 22, 2017, Paul released a remix of "It's Everyday Bro", featuring American rapper Gucci Mane in place of Team 10, alongside the new music video for it. On April 27, 2018, he released the single and music video for "Malibu" with now-former Team 10 member Chad Tepper. On May 11, he released another single and music video for "My Teachers", featuring now-former Team 10 members Sunny Malouf and Anthony Trujillo, along with the music video. On May 24, he released two singles, "Randy Savage" and "Cartier Vision". The former song features Team 10 and hip-hop duo Jitt & Quan, featuring vocals from Team 10 members at the time, consisting of Anthony Trujillo, Sunny Malouf, Justin Roberts, Erika Costell, and Chad Tepper; it was released along with the music video. The latter song features Anthony and the duo as well; the music video was released later on September 12.

On August 15, 2018, Paul released another single titled "Champion", with a music video. The song was a diss track towards Paul's boxing opponent Deji Olatunji (ComedyShortsGamer), the younger brother of British YouTube star, internet personality, boxer, and rapper KSI. Their fight took place ten days later on August 25. Throughout the summer of 2018, Paul and Team 10 went on a tour in North America, performing their songs. Gradually, the Team 10 members split up throughout the year.

Paul's varied business ventures ultimately led to his second-place ranking in Forbes' list of highest-paid YouTubers in 2018.

On March 1, 2019, Paul released the track and music video for "I'm Single". The song focused on Paul's feelings about being single and his breakup with Erika Costell. As the social media accounts for Team 10 have been inactive since September 2019, some assumed that Team 10 had disbanded and Paul had formed a new team.

In June 2025 he featured on the Forbes list as one of the world's highest paid creators with estimated earnings in 2024 of $50m.

=== 2019–2020: More focus on music ===
On December 13, 2019, Paul released another single, "These Days", alongside a music video featuring model Julia Rose. The song features Jake rapping about his past long-distance relationship with his ex-girlfriend, Alissa Violet. Less than a year later, the song was removed from all streaming services.

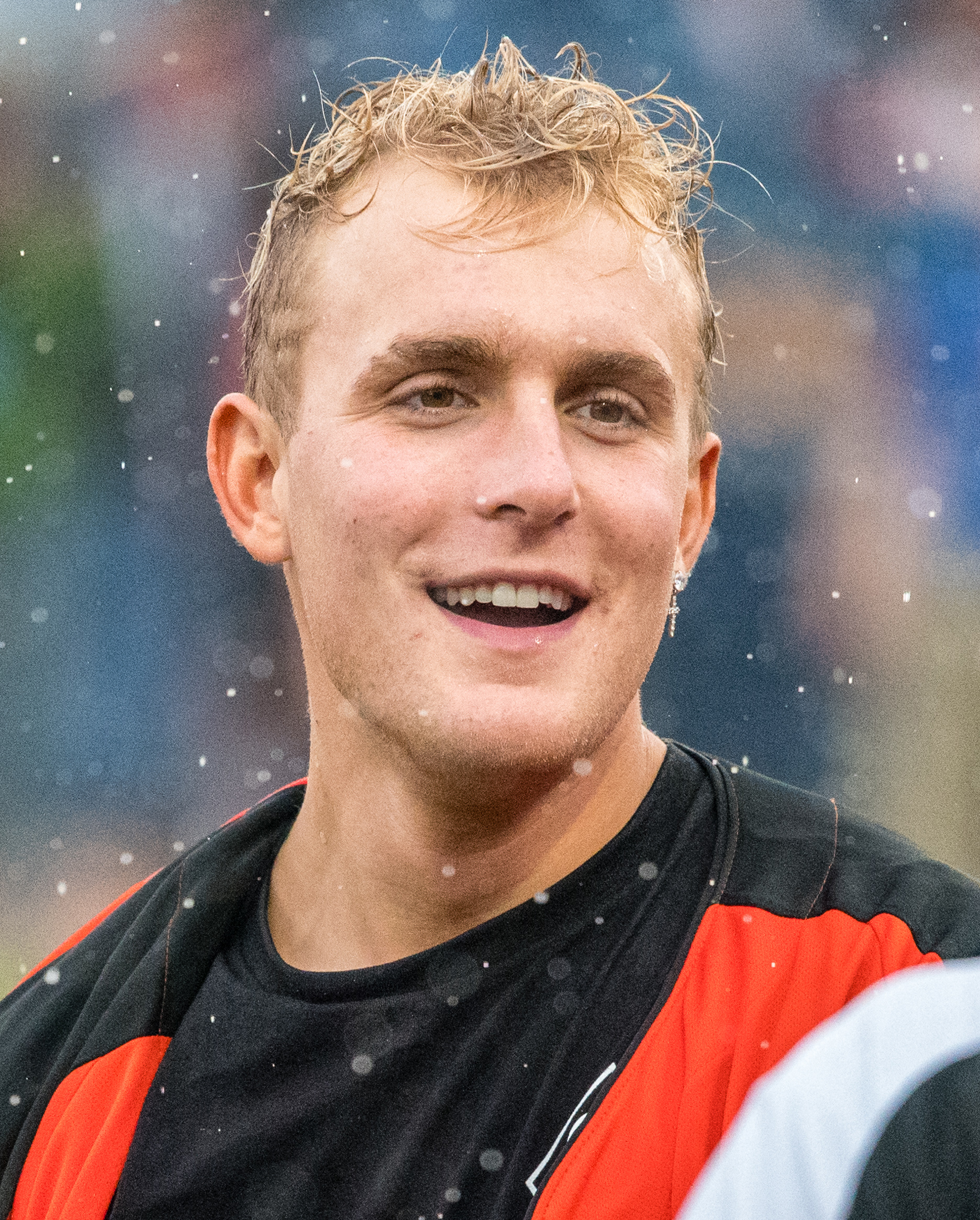
Paul in 2019

On July 24, 2020, Paul released the single "Fresh Outta London", which was released alongside the music video. For the video shoot, he threw a party at his home in Calabasas, California on July 11, in which he garnered national attention after being criticized by Calabasas mayor Alicia Weintraub after videos and pictures of the party surfaced online.

On September 10, Paul released another single, titled "23", alongside a music video at his house which only starred his older brother Logan and also featured clips of him and a few of his friends. The title of the song refers to his age at the time, as well as American former basketball player Michael Jordan's jersey number.

On October 15, Paul released the single "Dummy", featuring Canadian rapper TVGucci, who is signed to fellow Canadian rapper Drake's record label, OVO Sound. The lyric video was published on Paul's YouTube channel six days later, on October 21.

=== 2021–present: Sports business, startups, and investments ===
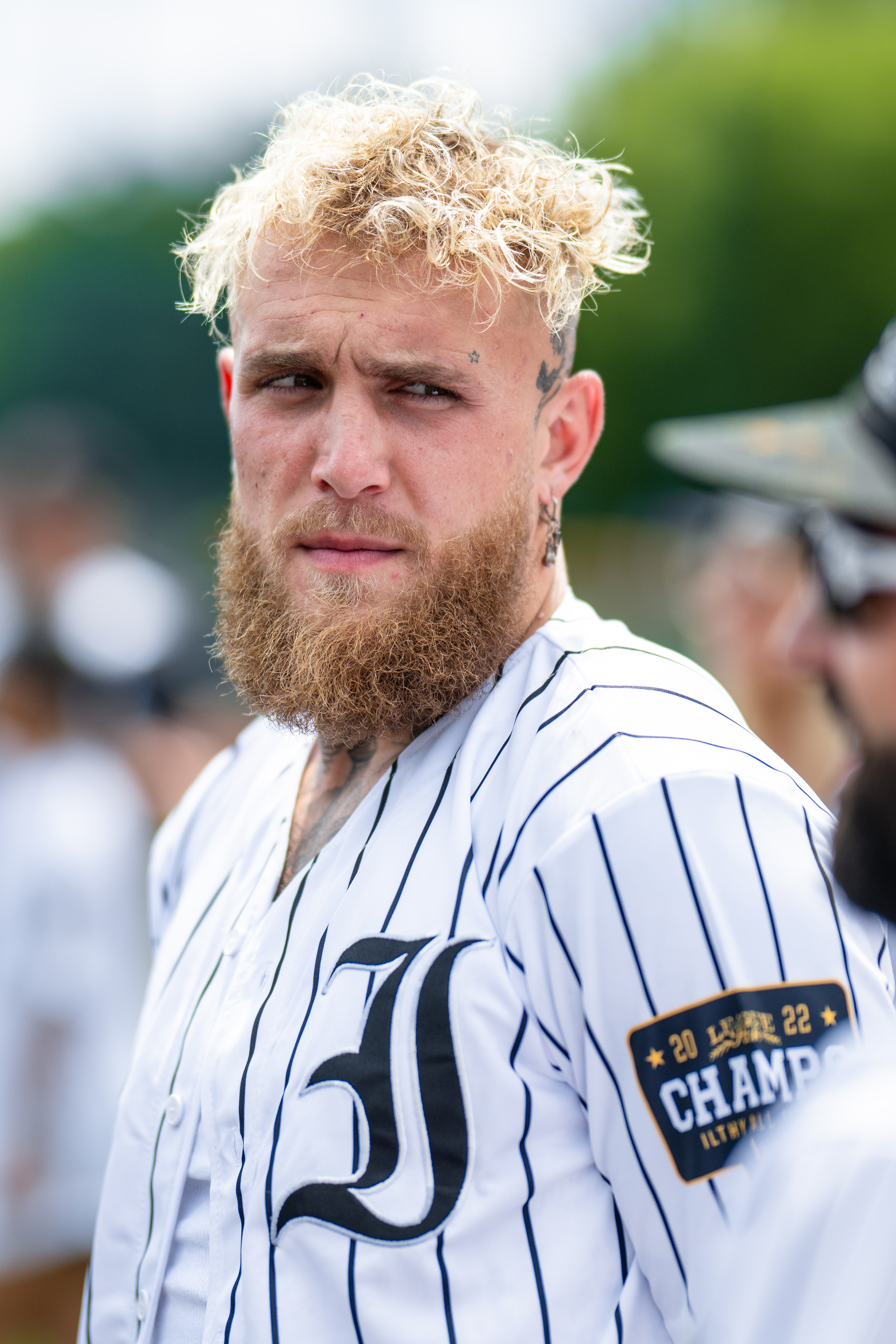
Paul in 2023 at a Charity Softball Game

In 2021, Paul partnered with serial entrepreneur Geoffrey Woo to launch a venture capital firm called Anti Fund. In August 2021, Anti Fund led investment in sports gambling firm Simplebet Inc. raising $30 million in a financing round in August 2021. In August 2022, Anti Fund invested in defense technology and military contractor Anduril Industries.

Paul founded Most Valuable Promotions (MVP) with his business adviser, Nakisa Bidarian, in 2021, signing professional boxer Amanda Serrano to a promotional deal in September 2021. In tandem, Paul founded an organization named Boxing Bullies to help youth combat bullying.

In May 2022, Paul featured on the Forbes list for the highest paid athletes in 2022. Forbes estimated that Paul made $38 million from his three boxing bouts, and various other income streams in the period.

In August 2022, Paul founded Betr, a sports-media and mobile-betting company alongside Simplebet founder Joey Levy. Paul claims to have received $50 million in series-A funding for this venture. In March 2024, Betr raised $15 million at a $375 million valuation, led by Harmony Partners and 10X Capital, with its total funding reaching $100 million as it aims to expand its sports betting operations, including real-money fantasy sports product in 24 states and plans for a nationwide sportsbook brand.

In November 2022, Paul's brother Logan faced Roman Reigns in a wrestling match for the Undisputed WWE Universal Championship, headlining WWE Crown Jewel in Saudi Arabia. Paul made an appearance during the match, entering the arena to his 2017 song "It's Everyday Bro" and rescuing Logan from an attack by The Usos and Solo Sikoa. Despite the intervention, Logan lost the match.

In January 2023, Paul signed a multiyear contract with the Professional Fighters League to cofound and compete in a new pay-per-view division, known as Super Fight, as well as adopt the official role of "head of fighter advocacy".

In June 2024, Paul launched a men's personal care brand called W, with products priced at less than $10 with retail partner Walmart. The company was incubated by Paul's venture capital firm Anti Fund. In July 2024, The Wall Street Journal reported that W has raised over $14M in venture capital funding from Shrug Capital and others including tennis star Naomi Osaka at a valuation over $150M.

In June 2026, The New York Times DealBook reported that Anti Fund had closed its first growth capital fund at $100 million, bringing the firm to $180 million in assets under management.

== Boxing career ==
=== Early career ===
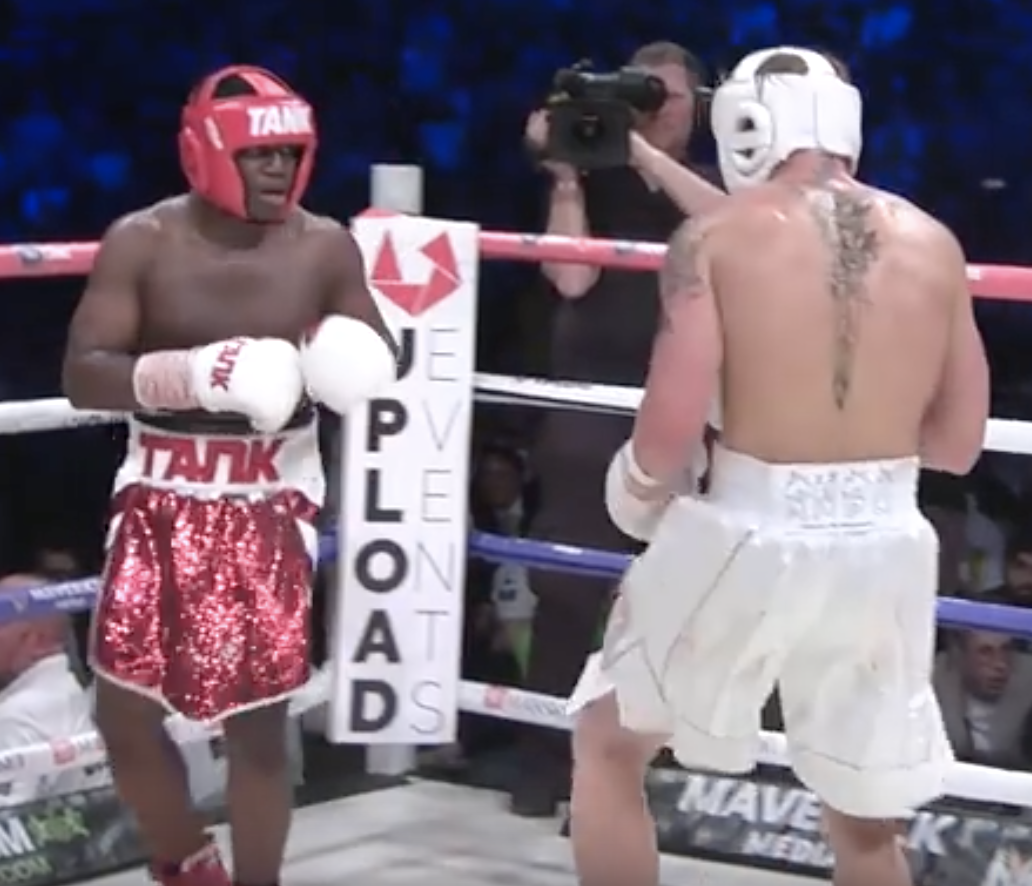
Paul against Deji in 2018

In 2018, Paul made his boxing debut in a white-collar match against English YouTuber Deji Olatunji. Paul vs Olatunji was the co-feature bout to Paul's older brother's fight, Logan Paul, against Olatunji's older brother, KSI. The bout took place on August 25 at Manchester Arena in Manchester, England. Paul defeated Olatunji via technical knockout in the 5th round.

In 2020, Paul made his professional debut against English YouTuber AnEsonGib. The bout took place on January 30 at the Meridian at Island Gardens in Miami, Florida and was the co-feature bout to the WBO world middleweight title bout between professional boxers Demetrius Andrade and Luke Keeler. Paul defeated AnEsonGib via technical knockout in the 1st round and proceeded to call out KSI.

On November 28, Paul returned to the ring against Basketball Player Nate Robinson and was the co-feature bout to the exhibition match between Mike Tyson and Roy Jones Jr. at the STAPLES Center in Los Angeles, California. Paul defeated Robinson via knockout in the 2nd round.

=== Transition into MMA fighters ===
==== Paul vs. Askren ====
In 2021, after a back-and-forth on social media, it was announced that Paul would headline a bout with former Bellator MMA and ONE Welterweight Champion Ben Askren on April 17, 2021 at the Mercedes-Benz Stadium in Atlanta, Georgia. Paul defeated Askren via technical knockout in the 1st round. The event reportedly generated 1.45 million pay-per-view buys as per Triller, however, the legitimacy of both the match and the numbers of the event have been heavily questioned by multiple personalities, fans, MMA fighters and boxers alike.

==== Paul vs. Woodley ====
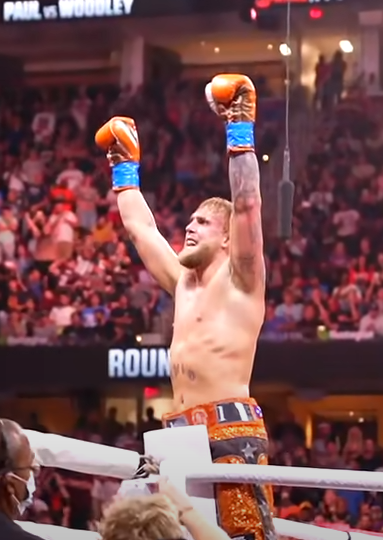
Paul after the first Tyron Woodley bout

Prior to the Paul vs Askren bout, Paul and one of his cornermen, American professional boxer J'Leon Love, were involved in a backstage confrontation with former UFC Welterweight Champion Tyron Woodley. After Paul defeated Askren, Woodley called him out. On August 29 Paul fought Woodley at the Rocket Mortgage FieldHouse in Cleveland, Ohio and defeated him via split decision, with one judge scoring the fight 77–75 for Woodley, while the other two judges scored it 77–75 and 78–74 in favor of Paul. After the bout, Woodley expressed his desires for a rematch and Paul offered him one if he tattooed "I love Jake Paul" on his body. The event reportedly generated 500,000 pay-per-view buys.

In December, Paul was originally scheduled to face English professional boxer Tommy Fury on December 18 at the Amalie Arena in Tampa, Florida, but Fury withdrew due to medical issues. On December 6, it was announced that Paul would be rematching Woodley instead. Paul defeated Woodley via knockout in the 6th round. The event reportedly generated 200,000 pay-per-view buys. After the bout, Paul was awarded the ESPN Ringside Award for "Knockout of the Year" over his victory on Woodley.

In 2022, Paul was scheduled to face Fury for August 6 at Madison Square Garden in New York City, but Fury withdrew once again due to travel issues. On July 7, it was announced that Paul would face American professional boxer Hasim Rahman Jr., however, the event was canceled on July 30 due to weight issues from Rahman.

==== Paul vs. Silva ====
After the cancellation, it was announced that Paul would be facing former UFC champion Anderson Silva on October 29 at the Desert Diamond Arena in Glendale, Arizona. Paul defeated Silva via unanimous decision with the judges scoring the bout 78–73, 78–73, and 77–74 in favor of Paul.

=== First defeat to Tommy Fury ===
After two previous attempts failing, on January 27, 2023, it was announced that Paul would face Fury on February 26 in Saudi Arabia. Fury defeated Paul via split decision despite Paul knocking Fury down in the 8th round. One judge scored it 75–74 to Paul, while the other two judges had it 76–73 to Fury. The event reportedly generated 800,000 pay-per-views.

After the bout with Tommy Fury, KSI's manager Mams Taylor revealed that he and Paul's team were in negotiations to have a bout with the YouTuber set for August at Wembley Stadium in London, England, however, Taylor stated that after the Fury loss, Paul exited the negotiations. Paul later confirmed that he opted out and chose to have a bout with Nate Diaz instead, whom he deemed the tougher opponent.

==== Paul vs. Diaz ====
On April 12, it was announced that Paul would face Diaz on August 5 at the American Airlines Center in Dallas, Texas. Although the fight was originally scheduled to be 8 rounds, it was later extended to 10. Paul defeated Diaz via unanimous decision with the judges scoring the bout 98–91, 98–91 and 97–92 all in favor of Paul.

=== Moving up in weight and transition to professional boxers ===
On October 16, 2023, it was announced that Paul would be returning to the ring on December 15. On November 8, Paul's opponent was confirmed to be American professional boxer Andre August (10–1–1). The bout would take place at the Caribe Royal Hotel in Orlando, Florida as the headline bout of Most Valuable Prospects IV. This was Paul's first headline bout to not be on pay-per-view with Paul stating "so far, my entire boxing career has been on PPV, but now it's about more than business. Now I want to build my experience in the ring." Paul defeated August by knockout in the first round.

On December 21, 2023, it was announced that Paul would be fighting on March 2, 2024, at the Coliseo de Puerto Rico José Miguel Agrelot in San Juan, Puerto Rico. On January 30, 2024, Paul's opponent was announced to be American professional boxer Ryan Bourland (17–2). Paul defeated Bourland by technical knockout in the first round.

==== Paul vs. Perry ====
On June 11, 2024, it was announced that Paul will face former UFC fighter and Bare Knuckle Fighting Championship "King of Violence" Mike Perry on July 20, 2024, after Mike Tyson was unable to compete on that date. On June 18, 2024, the bout against Perry was confirmed for July 20, 2024 at Amalie Arena in Tampa, FL. Paul won the fight by technical knockout in the sixth round.

=== Sanctioned bout against Mike Tyson ===
On March 7, 2024, it was announced that Paul would take on former undisputed heavyweight champion Mike Tyson on July 20 at AT&T Stadium in Arlington, Texas. The bout was broadcast on Netflix. The bout marked Paul's debut fight at heavyweight. On April 29, 2024, it was announced that the fight would be sanctioned as a professional boxing match by Texas Department of Licensing and Regulations (TDLR). On May 31, 2024, it was announced that the fight was postponed after Tyson suffered an ulcer flare up aboard a plane. On June 7, 2024, it was announced that the fight would take place at the same arena on November 15, 2024. During preparation for the Perry and Tyson bouts, Paul brought in former NABA Gold heavyweight champion DaCarree Scott as a sparring partner. Scott said he was selected partly because of his height and ability to replicate Tyson's compact fighting style.

On November 7, 2024, Netflix premiered the first two episodes of Countdown: Paul vs. Tyson, with the third, and final one following on November 12. The show is narrated by Ice-T.

Paul defeated Tyson via unanimous decision with the judges scoring the bout 80–72, 79–73 and 79–73 in favor of Paul. The match became the biggest boxing gate in U.S. history outside of Las Vegas.

==== Paul vs. Chávez Jr. ====
Jake Paul fought Julio César Chávez Jr. in a 10-round cruiserweight bout in Anaheim, CA, on June 28, 2025. Paul defeated Chavez via unanimous decision with the judges scoring the fight 99–91, 97–93 and 98–92 all in favor of Paul. Following the fight, Paul was ranked #14 by the WBA, with WBC President Mauricio Sulaiman stating Paul would also receive a ranking with their organization. This made Paul eligible to challenge WBA cruiserweight champion Gilberto Ramirez for the world title. However, after other ranked contenders criticized the decision, the WBA announced it was reviewing Paul's ranking, and Mauricio Sulaiman stated Paul must first defeat one of the top 15 ranked contenders by the WBC to receive a title shot.

=== Cancelled exhibition bout against Gervonta Davis ===
On August 20, 2025, it was announced that Paul would take on the WBA Lightweight Champion Gervonta Davis in a non-title bout on November 14 at the State Farm Arena in Atlanta, Georgia. The bout will be broadcast on Netflix. The bout was widely criticized due to the sheer size difference between Paul and Davis, as Davis weighs around 65 pounds less than Paul. On September 17, the event was moved to the Kaseya Center in Miami, Florida after both Paul and Davis withdrew their request for event permits in Atlanta due to sanctioning issues.

Two weeks prior to the fight, Davis was mentioned in a civil lawsuit that accused him of violent behavior, battery, and kidnapping. There were concerns that this situation could affect the scheduled fight. Promoters and stakeholders expressed serious apprehensions, prompting discussions about potential changes to the event. One consideration was that Netflix might withdraw as the broadcaster in light of the allegations. Alternatives included either postponing the event or securing a substitute opponent. On November 4, Most Valuable Promotions and Netflix announced the cancellation of the card. Paul publicly criticized Davis on Twitter, calling him unprofessional. Nakisa Bidarian mentioned that there were still plans for Paul to headline a Netflix event in 2025.

=== Professional bout against Anthony Joshua ===
On November 17, 2025, it was announced that Paul would take on the former two-time unified heavyweight champion, and IBF/WBO No. 1 Ranked Heavyweight Anthony Joshua in a professional boxing match on December 19 at the Kaseya Center in Miami, Florida. The bout was broadcast on Netflix, and was scheduled to last for eight sets of three minute rounds and was fought with 10 oz gloves. The bout was widely criticized due to the sheer size difference between Paul and Joshua, as Paul weighed around 53 pounds less than Joshua in their respective most recent fights, as well as for Joshua's higher level of experience at championship level boxing. Paul was overmatched and lost the fight via knockout in the sixth round, suffering his first knockout loss in his career. As a result of the jaw injuries he suffered, Paul had two titanium plates installed in his mouth. He was unable to eat solid food for at least one week and had some teeth removed. In January 2026, Paul lost his #14 WBA cruiserweight ranking. In a May 2026 interview with Ariel Helwani, Paul claimed that his boxing career was "most definitely" in doubt due to the jaw injuries that he suffered though he later claimed he will be medically cleared for sparring in two-to-three months.

==== Paul vs. Doumbé ====
On November 2, 2026, it was announced that Paul would take on former two-time Glory Welterweight Champion Cédric Doumbé on December 24 at the Coca-Cola Arena in Dubai.

== Most Valuable Promotions ==
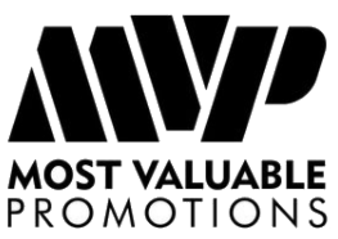
Most Valuable Promotions logo

In 2021, Paul, alongside his adviser Nakisa Bidarian, founded a boxing promotion titled 'Most Valuable Promotions.' The promotions first signing was of Puerto Rican boxer and seven-division world champion Amanda Serrano.

In 2022, Paul co-promoted with Eddie Hearn's Matchroom Boxing, Katie Taylor vs. Amanda Serrano billed as "For History". It was the first women's boxing match to headline Madison Square Garden, and was described as the 'biggest women's fight of all time'. The fight was universally acclaimed, being named Fight of the Year by Sports Illustrated and Event of the Year by The Ring.

In 2023, Most Valuable Promotions and DAZN announced a new series of events billed as 'Most Valuable Prospects,' which would feature up-and-coming boxers headlining events on DAZN without pay-per-view. Their first event took place on May 26 which headlined Ashton Sylve vs Adam Kipenga at the Caribe Royale Orlando in Orlando, Florida. Sylve defeated Kipenga via unanimous decision.

== Mixed martial arts career ==
=== Professional Fighter League ===
On January 5, 2023, it was announced that Paul had signed a multi-year deal with the Professional Fighters League (PFL). In anticipation of his MMA debut, Paul began training Brazilian jiu-jitsu with ADCC head organizer Mo Jassim and Michael Perez.

On January 21, 2026, it was reported that Paul had departed the PFL as his deal with the promotion had expired, leaving without ever fighting for the promotion.

== Controversies and legal issues ==
Throughout his career, Paul has become the subject of many controversies due to his behavior, including being charged with criminal trespass and unlawful assembly.

=== Content controversies ===
On January 3, 2018, Paul uploaded a video to his YouTube channel entitled "I lost my virginity" that used a thumbnail of himself and his then-girlfriend Erika Costell posing semi-nude on top of each other. The video was age-restricted by YouTube as a result, and critics such as Keemstar criticized the thumbnail as being inappropriate for his younger audience. The thumbnail was later changed to show both Paul and Costell fully clothed, not touching each other.

On November 29, 2020, Paul sparked frustration by stating that he paved the way for content houses and boxing matches between high-profile social media stars. Many objected to Paul's claim, observing that he did not create the first content house, nor was he the first YouTube star to fight in a boxing match.

=== Racism allegations ===
On August 1, 2017, Paul uploaded a video titled "SELF DRIVING TESLA IN DRIVE THRU PRANK (FREAKOUTS)". A fan approached Paul in the video, asking if he could appear in his vlog. One of Paul's associates asked where the fan was from, who identified himself as Kazakhstani. Paul responded with the retort, "It sounds like you're just going to blow someone up. Send the nuke!" Subsequently, Paul was accused of perpetuating stereotypes of Arabs and Muslims in the United States as suicide bombers, as Kazakhstan is predominantly Muslim.

In November 2017, twin brothers Ivan and Emilio Martínez left Team 10. In a vlog explaining their departure from the group, the brothers accused Paul and the other members of regularly targeting them out of anti-Mexican sentiment, conflating them with Mexicans when they are, in fact, Spaniards. The Martínezes alleged that Paul and his associates would use Hispanic stereotypes and slurs, invade their privacy, destroy their property, and withhold payment after telling them they could not have a bank account due to being immigrants. When interviewed by Shane Dawson on the Martínezes' accusations, Paul said "nothing was off-limits" when it came to jokes the Team 10 members made about each other, that "[he thinks] at the time [the Martínez twins] thought it was funny" and they were accusing him of racism to boost their career without him.

On January 5, 2018, in the week after his "I lost my virginity" video and his brother's Aokigahara controversy, TMZ revealed a video in which Paul used the racial slur nigger multiple times while freestyle rapping to "Throw Sum Mo".

=== Scam allegations ===
In January 2018, Paul started the website Edfluence, a program claiming to teach younger people how to be successful, learn life skills, and earn money online. The course costs $7 per user, allowing users to unlock a series of videos for a "roadmap" to success as an influencer. However, the $7 did not unlock the entire program; it only provided a few basic tips. Paul also promised his audience that if they joined the course, they would get to join "Team 1000", which did not happen. Following the situation, Paul was accused of scamming young followers and stealing their money. Then, two years later, on January 31, 2020, Edfluence was shut down, which stopped the course permanently. On February 15, Paul announced that he would partner with Los Angeles-based brand development group GenZ Holdings Inc. to create a $19.99-per-month platform aimed at teaching children how to build an online presence. "The Financial Freedom Movement" promises to give subscribers access to "Jake Paul's personal experience, rituals and secret formula" and "cutting edge mentorship, coaching, and training". The program has been criticized by some, with one interviewer questioning whether it would send a dangerous message to his young fanbase.

On January 3, 2019, Paul, along with fellow YouTuber RiceGum, came under fire for promoting MysteryBrand, a website that offers the chance to open a digital "mystery box" of pre-selected items with a promise to win one in real life at random. Many users have said they have not received prizes they won through the site.

On February 18, 2022, in a class-action lawsuit filed against the cryptocurrency company SafeMoon that alleged the company is a pump and dump scheme, Paul was named as a defendant along with musician Nick Carter, rappers Soulja Boy and Lil Yachty, and social media personality Ben Phillips for promoting the SafeMoon token on their social media accounts with misleading information as part of the 2022 Safemoon fraud allegations. On the same day, the United States Court of Appeals for the Eleventh Circuit ruled in a lawsuit against Bitconnect that the Securities Act of 1933 extends to targeted solicitation using social media. In March 2022, YouTuber Coffeezilla uploaded a video in which he accused Paul of using cryptocurrency and non-fungible tokens to scam his fans out of $2.2 million.

=== Party complaints, public nuisance lawsuits, and COVID-19 ===
In addition to the 2017 public complaints that eventually led to Paul's dismissal from Bizaardvark, Paul's neighbors in the Beverly Grove neighborhood of Los Angeles filed a class-action public nuisance lawsuit against Paul. This came after Paul made his home address public, leading crowds of fans to gather outside Paul's residence and noise complaints by neighbors. On April 24, 2018, it was reported that Paul was being sued by Cobra Acquisitions, the company that owns the house, for $2.5 million.

On February 23, 2020, in Las Vegas, Nevada, Paul was involved in an altercation with British singer Zayn Malik at Westgate, the hotel near the MGM Grand Garden Arena at which the two were staying. Paul and Malik's rooms were right across from each other, and when Paul's older brother Logan went to Paul's hotel room, an argument broke out between Malik and Paul because Paul believed Malik was using a rude tone. Following the interaction, Paul posted about it on Twitter, which drew attention from Malik's girlfriend, American model Gigi Hadid. Paul later deleted his tweets criticizing Malik and posted another tweet stating that he tweeted about the incident since he was drunk, acknowledging the fact in a tweet later in the day, writing, "Someone needs to take my phone when i'm drunk because I'm a fucking idiot". Logan released the video footage on the 161st episode of his podcast, Impaulsive, in which he explained the whole situation.

On July 11, 2020, Paul threw a large party at his home in Calabasas, California, despite the ongoing COVID-19 pandemic. Dozens of people attended without wearing masks or maintaining social distancing. After complaints from neighbors and videos surfaced on social media, Calabasas mayor Alicia Weintraub expressed outrage, saying, "They're having this large party, no social distancing, no masks, it's just a big, huge disregard for everything that everybody is trying to do to get things back to functioning." She continued, saying, "It's really just a party acting like COVID does not exist, it's acting that businesses aren't closed". She later added that the city was looking into "all of our options" regarding penalties for Paul and the attendees of the party.

On November 25, 2020, Paul attracted further COVID-related controversy due to statements in an interview with The Daily Beast. When interviewer Marlow Stern asked Paul if he regretted his words and actions regarding the July 11 party, Paul responded by saying that COVID-19 was a "hoax", also stating that "98 percent of news [about COVID-19] is fake", and that he believed the measures against COVID-19 in the United States should end, calling them "the most detrimental thing to our society." He then incorrectly stated that the flu had killed as many people in the United States in 2020 as COVID-19 did and claimed that "Medical professionals have [recently] also said that masks do absolutely nothing to prevent the spread of coronavirus"; he later referred to said professionals as "dozens of my medical friends." When Stern tried to question his claims, Paul told Stern, "You're arrogant. You're very arrogant", "you want clickbait", and "I've never even heard of you." The interview sparked condemnation from various individuals and media outlets, such as fellow YouTuber Tyler Oakley, who called Paul "aggressively ignorant" and "embarrassing."

=== Attending a riot at an Arizona mall and FBI raid ===
On May 30, 2020, Paul and a few of his friends came to have dinner at P. F. Chang's outside of Scottsdale Fashion Square in Scottsdale, Arizona, as part of the George Floyd protests, where it quickly escalated, and looting began in the mall. Multiple instances of footage show Paul and his friends outside P. F. Chang's, witnessing the riot, and then going inside the mall, where they documented the incident. People on social media criticized Paul for entering the mall and witnessing people looting stores. Paul later apologized on social media condemning the violence, and also denied the accusations of looting, instead saying he was filming as a public service for a future video. Paul said, "We filmed everything we saw in an effort to share our experience and bring more attention to the anger felt in every neighborhood we travelled through; we were strictly documenting, not engaging."

On June 4, 2020, Paul was charged with criminal trespass and unlawful assembly, both misdemeanor charges, for being in the mall during the riot. On August 5, 2020, Paul's Calabasas mansion was raided by the Federal Bureau of Investigation (FBI). In a statement to the Los Angeles Times, the FBI stated, "The FBI is executing a federal search warrant at a residence in Calabasas in connection with an ongoing investigation." On the same day, the charges were dismissed without prejudice; the Scottsdale Police Department said it was "in the best interest of the community" and would allow a federal criminal investigation to be completed. Paul also explained in a now-deleted video that the raid was "completely related to the looting controversy". In August 2021, it was reported Paul would not face federal charges over the incident.

=== Sexual assault allegations ===
On April 9, 2021, a video was released by TikTok personality Justine Paradise, who alleged that Paul forced her into oral sex and touched her without her consent during an incident at the Team 10 House in 2019. Paul responded to the accusations, saying, "Sexual assault accusations aren't something that I, or anyone should ever take lightly, but to be crystal clear, this claim made against me is 100% false." In a later video, Paradise stated she received harassment and death threats over the accusation.

On April 22, 2021, an article in The New York Times about Paul featured a second accusation from model and actress Railey Lollie. Lollie, who had started working for Paul at 17, alleged that Paul would call her "jailbait" and had groped her at one point.

=== SEC fine for undisclosed cryptocurrencies sponsorship ===
In March 2023, Paul was among eight celebrities charged by the U.S. Securities and Exchange Commission (SEC) with violating investor protection laws by promoting cryptocurrencies without disclosing that they had been sponsored to do so. He settled the charges for over $400,000 without admitting or denying the claims.

=== Comments on Bad Bunny's Super Bowl performance ===
Bad Bunny headlined the 2026 Super Bowl LX halftime show for which Jake Paul criticized the artist calling him a "fake American citizen" and announced a boycott of the halftime show on Twitter for "openly hating on America". His older brother Logan Paul, disagreed with him stating "I love my brother but I don't agree with this."

== Personal life ==
Paul has Irish, Welsh, Polish, Hungarian, Jewish, French and German ancestry. Paul has a net worth of approximately $17–30 million. In January 2022, Forbes reported that Paul made approximately $38 million from boxing in 2021, making him the 46th highest paid athlete in the world for that period.

Paul began dating fellow American YouTuber and internet personality Tana Mongeau in April 2019. In June 2019, the couple announced that they were engaged, although many fans and commentators did not believe that the engagement was legitimate. On July 28 of that year, Paul and Mongeau exchanged vows in Las Vegas. InTouch later reported that the couple had not obtained a marriage license prior to the ceremony and that the officiant was also not licensed by the state of Nevada. As a result, the marriage was not legally binding. BuzzFeed News reported that Paul and Mongeau left the ceremony separately. The ceremony, which was available on pay-per-view for $50, was recorded by MTV for the show No Filter: Tana Mongeau. On an episode of the show, Mongeau stated that the ceremony was something "fun and lighthearted that we're obviously doing for fun and for content." The couple announced their break-up in January 2020.

He also dated Julia Rose who he met while shooting the music video of "These days" in 2019. They had an on-and-off again relationship but finally broke up in December 2022.

On April 3, 2023, Paul and Dutch speed skater Jutta Leerdam publicly confirmed being a couple after the two had gotten in touch via Instagram a few months earlier. In March 2025, Paul and Leerdam announced that they had gotten engaged. Paul purchased a mansion in Puerto Rico in 2023.

It was reported on February 11, 2025, that Paul discovered that his maternal grandmother was Jewish, making him Jewish according to Jewish law.

Paul is also known to be an avid supporter of Premier League club, Liverpool F.C.

=== Politics ===
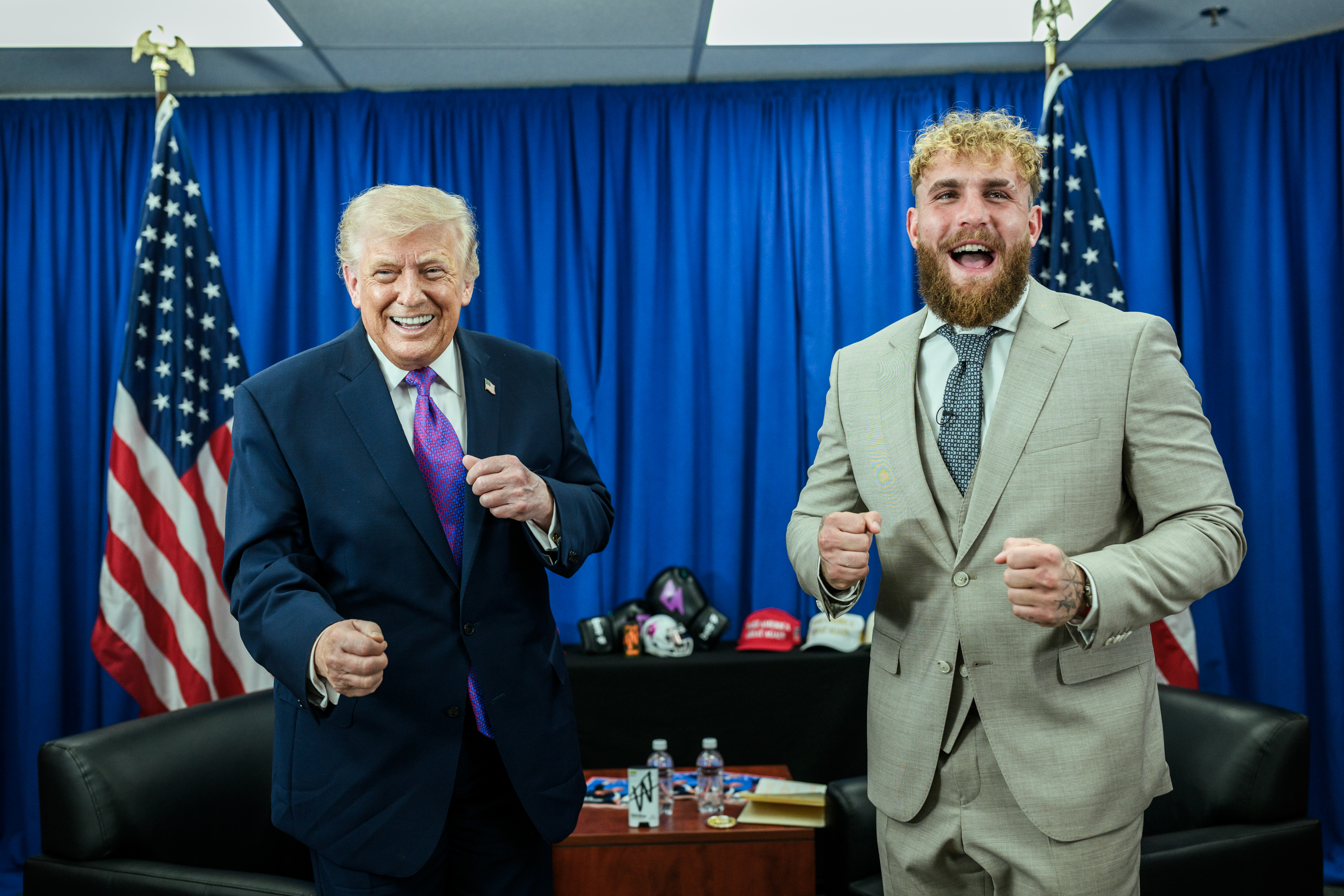
Paul with President Donald Trump in March 2026.

In September 2023, Paul supported the Republican presidential candidate Vivek Ramaswamy. He later expressed his support for Donald Trump and has been critical of the presidency of the Democratic president Joe Biden. Following the attempted assassination of Donald Trump in July 2024, Paul tweeted: "If it isn't apparent enough who God wants to win. When you try and kill God's angels and saviors of the world it just makes them bigger." He officially endorsed Trump in a YouTube video posted on October 31, 2024. On March 11, 2026, Paul was endorsed by Trump for any future political bid despite Paul not showing any recent interest in a political career.

== Boxing record ==
=== Professional ===
14 fights	12 wins	2 losses
By knockout	7	1
By decision	5	1

No.	Result	Record	Opponent	Type	Round, time	Date	Location	Notes
14	Loss	12–2	Anthony Joshua	KO	6 (8), 1:31	Dec 19, 2025	Kaseya Center, Miami, Florida. U.S.	
13	Win	12–1	Julio César Chávez Jr.	UD	10	Jun 28, 2025	Honda Center, Anaheim, California, U.S.	
12	Win	11–1	Mike Tyson	UD	8	Nov 15, 2024	AT&T Stadium, Arlington, Texas, U.S.	
11	Win	10–1	Mike Perry	TKO	6 (8), 1:12	Jul 20, 2024	Amalie Arena, Tampa, Florida, U.S.	
10	Win	9–1	Ryan Bourland	TKO	1 (8), 2:37	Mar 2, 2024	José Miguel Agrelot Coliseum, San Juan, Puerto Rico	
9	Win	8–1	Andre August	KO	1 (8), 2:32	Dec 15, 2023	Caribe Royale, Orlando, Florida, U.S.	
8	Win	7–1	Nate Diaz	UD	10	Aug 5, 2023	American Airlines Center, Dallas, Texas, U.S.	
7	Loss	6–1	Tommy Fury	SD	8	Feb 26, 2023	Diriyah Arena, Diriyah, Saudi Arabia	
6	Win	6–0	Anderson Silva	UD	8	Oct 29, 2022	Desert Diamond Arena, Glendale, Arizona, U.S.	
5	Win	5–0	Tyron Woodley	KO	6 (8), 2:12	Dec 18, 2021	Amalie Arena, Tampa, Florida, U.S.	
4	Win	4–0	Tyron Woodley	SD	8	Aug 29, 2021	Rocket Mortgage FieldHouse, Cleveland, Ohio, U.S.	
3	Win	3–0	Ben Askren	TKO	1 (8), 1:59	Apr 17, 2021	Mercedes-Benz Stadium, Atlanta, Georgia, U.S.	
2	Win	2–0	Nate Robinson	KO	2 (6), 1:24	Nov 28, 2020	Staples Center, Los Angeles, California, U.S.	
1	Win	1–0	AnEsonGib	TKO	1 (6), 2:18	Jan 30, 2020	The Meridian at Island Gardens, Miami, Florida, U.S.	

=== Amateur ===
1 fight	1 win	0 losses
By knockout	1	0

No.	Result	Record	Opponent	Type	Round, time	Date	Location	Notes
1	Win	1–0	Deji Olatunji	TKO	5 (6), 1:55	Aug 25, 2018	Manchester Arena, Manchester, England	

== Pay-per-view bouts ==
No.	Date	Fight	Billing	Buys	Network	Revenue
1	April 17, 2021	Paul vs. Askren	—N/a	500,000	Triller	$25,995,000
2	August 29, 2021	Paul vs. Woodley	—N/a	500,000	Showtime	$29,900,000
3	December 18, 2021	Paul vs. Woodley II	Leave No Doubt	200,000	Showtime	$11,998,000
4	October 29, 2022	Paul vs. Silva	—N/a	300,000	Showtime	$17,997,000
5	February 26, 2023	Paul vs. Fury	The Truth	800,000	ESPN+	$39,992,000
6	August 5, 2023	Paul vs. Diaz	Ready 4 War	450,000	DAZN / ESPN+	$27,000,000
7	July 20, 2024	Paul vs. Perry	Fear No Man	68,000	DAZN	N/A
8	June 28, 2025	Paul vs. Chávez Jr.	—N/a	Undisclosed	DAZN	N/A
Total				2,750,000		$152,882,000

== Filmography ==
=== Film ===
Film roles
Year	Title	Role	Notes	Ref.
2016	Dance Camp	Lance		
2016	Mono	Dugan	Cameo	
2019	Airplane Mode	Himself		
2020	Mainstream	Himself		
2022	A Genie's Tail	Wendell		
2023	Untold: Jake Paul the Problem Child	Himself	Documentary	

=== Television ===
Television roles
Year	Title	Role	Notes
2016–2018	Bizaardvark	Dirk Mann	Main role (seasons 1–2)
2016	The Monroes	Conrad	
2016	Walk the Prank	Himself	Special guest
2017	The Price Is Right	Himself	Special guest model
2020	Ridiculousness	Himself	Season 16; Episode 24
2021	All Access: Paul vs. Woodley	Himself	
2021	All Access: Paul vs. Woodley II	Himself	
2022	Real Sports with Bryant Gumbel	Episode: "Jake Paul"	
2022	WWE Crown Jewel	Himself	
2024	Countdown: Paul vs. Tyson	Himself	3 episodes
2025	Paul American	Himself	

=== Web shows ===
Web roles
Year	Title	Role	Notes
2018	The Mind of Jake Paul	Himself	The main subject of the documentary

=== Video games ===
Video games
Year	Title	Role	Notes	Ref.
2023	Rush Royale	Himself		
2024	Undisputed	Himself	“The Problem Child” downloadable content	

== Discography ==
=== Extended plays ===
List of extended plays, with selected chart positions and details
Title	EP details	Peak chart positions	
Title	EP details	US Heat.	US Ind.
Litmas (with Team 10)	Released: December 1, 2017; Label: Self-released; Formats: Digital download, streaming	2	29

=== Singles ===
List of notable singles as a lead artist with selected chart positions and certifications
Title	Year	Peak chart positions					Certifications
Title	Year	US	US Rap Dig.	CAN	SCO	UK Indie	Certifications
"It's Everyday Bro" (featuring Team 10 or remix featuring Gucci Mane)	2017	91	5	56	42	25	RIAA: Platinum
"Ohio Fried Chicken" (featuring Chance Sutton and Anthony Trujillo)	2017	—	15	—	—	—	
"Jerika" (with Erika Costell featuring Uncle Kade)	2017	86	12	76	—	—	
"That Ain't on the News"	2017	—	24	—	—	—	
"No Competition" (with Neptune)	2017	—	—	—	—	—	
"My Teachers" (featuring Sunny and AT3)	2017	—	—	—	—	—	
"Cartier Vision" (featuring AT3 and Jitt n Quan)	2018	—	—	—	—	—	
"Champion" (featuring Jitt n Quan)	2018	—	—	—	—	—	
"No Competition" (with Neptune)	2019	—	—	—	—	—	
"Fresh Outta London"	2020	—	—	—	—	— (Note: "Fresh Outta London" did not enter the UK Independent Singles Chart, but peaked at number eight on the UK Independent Singles Breakers chart.)	
"23"	2020	—	—	—	—	—	
"Dummy" (with TV Gucci)	2020	—	—	—	—	—	
"Park South Freestyle"	2020	—	—	—	—	—	
"Dana White Diss Track"	2022	—	—	—	—	—	
"—" denotes a single that did not chart or was not released.

List of singles as a featured artist, showing year released and album name
Title	Year	Album
"Chitty Bang" (Erika Costell featuring Jake Paul)	2018	Non-album single

== Bibliography ==
- Paul, Jake. You Gotta Want It, ISBN 978-1501139475, Gallery Books 2016 (memoir)

== Awards and nominations ==
Year	Award	Category	Recipient(s)	Result	Ref.
2014	Shorty Awards	Vineographer Award	Himself	Nominated	
2014	Shorty Awards	Comedian Award	Himself	Nominated	
2017	Streamy Awards	Creator of the Year	Himself	Nominated	
2017	Streamy Awards	Breakout Creator	Himself	Nominated	
2017	Teen Choice Awards	Choice Music Web Star	Himself	Won	
2017	Teen Choice Awards	Choice YouTuber	Himself	Won	
2021	Sports Illustrated	Breakout Boxer of the Year	Himself	Won	
2021	ESPN Ringside Awards	Knockout of the Year	His knockout over Tyron Woodley	Won	
2022	ESPN Ringside Awards	Viral Moment of the Year	His knockdown over Anderson Silva	Runner-up	
2023	Happy Punch Awards	Best Trash Talker	Himself	Pending	
