= Erika Costell =

American YouTuber (born 1992)

- Born: Erika Michaelanne Costell; November 12, 1992 (age 33); Toledo, Ohio, U.S.
- Education: Middle Tennessee State University (no degree)

YouTube information
- Channel: Erika Costell
- Years active: 2008–present
- Genres: Model; fashion
- Subscribers: 3.97 million
- Views: 164 million
- Last updated: June 17, 2026

Erika Michaelanne Costell (born November 12, 1992) is an American Internet personality. Her career began when she became associated with Team 10, an influencer marketing management agency. After dating YouTuber Jake Paul and featuring in his videos, Costell started her own YouTube channel, which increased her popularity.

== Early life and education ==
Costell was born in Toledo, Ohio, but she was raised in Bedford Township, Monroe County, Michigan, growing up with 12 siblings. At the age of 16, she began modeling while attending high school at Bedford High School in Michigan. She was previously represented by Wilhelmina International and the DAN Talent Group. After completing high school in 2011, she attended Middle Tennessee State University. She majored in business administration and left the university before her final semester in order to pursue modeling in Los Angeles.

== Career ==
In 2015, Costell became the first employee of Jake Paul's Team 10 on the business side as his assistant and later went on to be the Chief Operations Officer (COO). In 2017, she began a YouTube channel where she regularly posts vlogs, reaction videos and music videos. Following her 2018 breakup with Paul, she left Team 10 to pursue her own independent career, and signed with The Orchard for music.

In 2017, her single "Jerika" with Paul was featured on the Billboard Hot 100 and the Canadian Hot 100.

In 2020, Costell started a record label named BIA Entertainment, which she describes as "a music label by women, for women."

== Discography ==
=== Extended plays ===
- Don't Worry (2019)

=== Singles ===
==== As lead artist ====
List of singles as a lead artist, with selected chart positions, showing year released and album name
Title	Year	Peak chart positions		Album
Title	Year	US	CAN	Album
"Jerika" (with Jake Paul featuring Uncle Kade)	2017	86	76	Non-album singles
"Chitty Bang" (featuring Jake Paul)	2018	—	—	Non-album singles
"Not Her"	2018	—	—	Non-album singles
"Karma"	2018	—	—	Non-album singles
"Dynamite"	2018	—	—	Non-album singles
"Queen"	2019	—	—	Non-album singles
"Thots Not Feelings"	2019	—	—	Non-album singles
"Second"	2019	—	—	Non-album single
"Don't Worry"	2019	—	—	"Don't Worry"
"Conscience"	2019	—	—	"Don't Worry"
"No Roof"	2020	—	—	Non-album single

== Awards and nominations ==
Year	Award	Category	Result	Ref(s)
2018	Teen Choice Awards	Music Web Star	Won	

== See also ==
- List of YouTubers
