= Paulina Ángel =

Colombian boxer (born 2001

Personal information
- Born: Maria Paulina Ángel Velasquez; 8 May 2001 (age 25) Medellín, Colombia
- Height: 5 ft 6 in (168 cm)
- Weight: Super-lightweight, Lightweight, Super-featherweight, Featherweight

Boxing career
- Reach: 66 in (168 cm)
- Stance: Orthodox

Boxing record
- Total fights: 12
- Wins: 7
- Win by KO: 3
- Losses: 3
- Draws: 2

Paulina Ángel (born 8 May 2001) is Colombian professional boxer who challenged for the WBA female lightweight title in August 2025. She is also a former WBA female Latin American super-lightweight champion.

== Career ==
Having turned professional in 2020, Ángel faced Mónica Henao in her ninth pro-fight at Coliseo Elias Chegwin in Barranquilla on 16 March 2024, with the vacant WBA Latin American and Colombian female super-lightweight titles on the line. The bout was stopped in the sixth round due to an injury to her opponent's face caused by an accidental clash of heads. Ángel was ahead on the three judges' scorecards at the time and therefore was declared the winner, and champion, via technical decision.

She challenged WBA female lightweight champion Stephanie Han at the Caribe Royale Resort in Orlando, Florida, USA, on 23 August 2025. Ángel knocked her opponent to the canvas in the first round, but went on to lose by unanimous decision.

Ángel faced Leila Beaudoin for the vacant interim WBA female super-featherweight title at Théâtre Capitole in Quebec City, Canada, on 11 June.2026. She lost by unanimous decision.
