= Jerika =

2017 single by Jake Paul and Erika Costell featuring Uncle Kade

Single by Jake Paul and Erika Costell featuring Uncle Kade
- Released: July 12, 2017
- Length: 4:08
- Label: Team 10
- Songwriter(s): Jake Paul
- Producer(s): Yaygo

Jake Paul singles chronology
"Ohio Fried Chicken" (2017)	"Jerika" (2017)	"That Ain't on the News" (2017)

Erika Costell singles chronology
"Jerika" (2017)	"Powerful Emotions" (2017)

Music video
- "Jerika" on YouTube

"Jerika" is a song by American Internet personalities Jake Paul and Erika Costell featuring American photographer and filmmaker Uncle Kade, who was a member of Paul's group Team 10. It was released to streaming services on July 12, 2017. It is Costell's debut single and Paul's highest charting song, reaching the Billboard Hot 100 in August 2017 at number 86.

== Background ==
The title refers to a supposed marriage between Jake Paul and Erika Costell. However, Paul told The New York Times that the relationship was not real, saying "We're not even actually dating. It's like the WWE. People know that's fake, and it's one of the biggest things of entertainment."

== Critical reception ==
Chris DeVille of Stereogum described the song as "a romantic hip-hop/R&B duet between Paul and Costell slathered in so much Auto-Tune that it has to be a joke."

== Charts ==
Chart (2017)	Peak position
Canada (Canadian Hot 100)	76
US Billboard Hot 100	86
