= Jake Paul vs. Tyron Woodley II =

2021 professional crossover boxing rematch

Leave No Doubt
- Date: December 18, 2021
- Venue: Amalie Arena, Tampa, Florida, U.S.

Tale of the tape
Boxer	Jake Paul	Tyron Woodley
Nickname	The Problem Child	The Chosen One
Hometown	Cleveland, Ohio, U.S.	Ferguson, Missouri, U.S.
Pre-fight record	4–0 (3 KOs) (Professional); 1–0 (Amateur)	0–1 (Professional boxing); 19–7–1 (7 KOs) (MMA)
Height	6 ft 1 in (1.85 m)	5 ft 9 in (1.75 m)
Weight	191 1/2 lb (87 kg)	189 1/2 lb (86 kg)
Style	Orthodox	Orthodox
Recognition		Former UFC welterweight champion

Result
- Paul wins via 6th-round KO

Jake Paul vs. Tyron Woodley II, billed as "Leave No Doubt", was a cruiserweight professional crossover boxing rematch contested between American YouTuber Jake Paul and American mixed martial artist Tyron Woodley. The bout took place at the Amalie Arena in Tampa, Florida, on December 18, 2021. The fight sold 200,000 PPV buys.

== Background ==
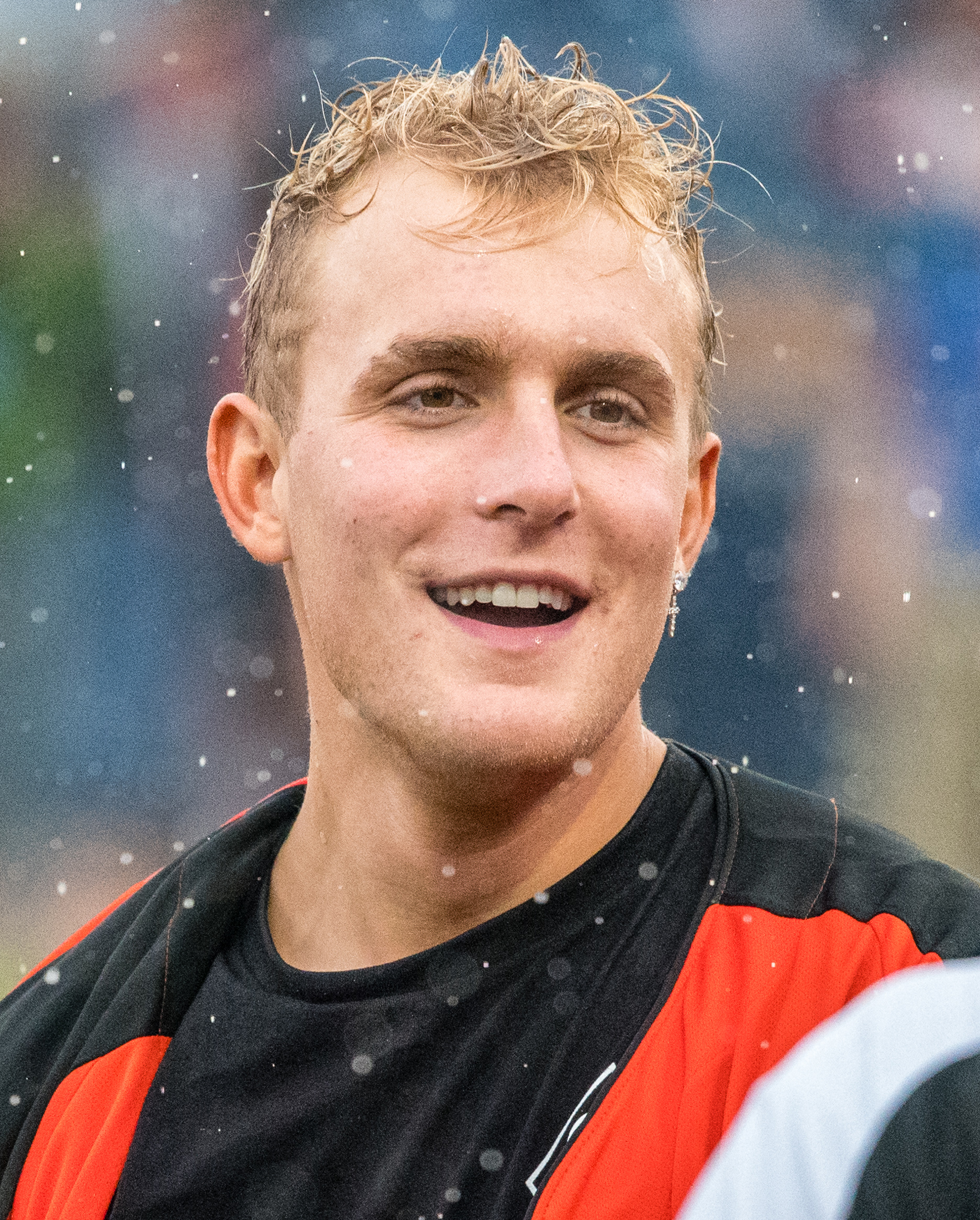
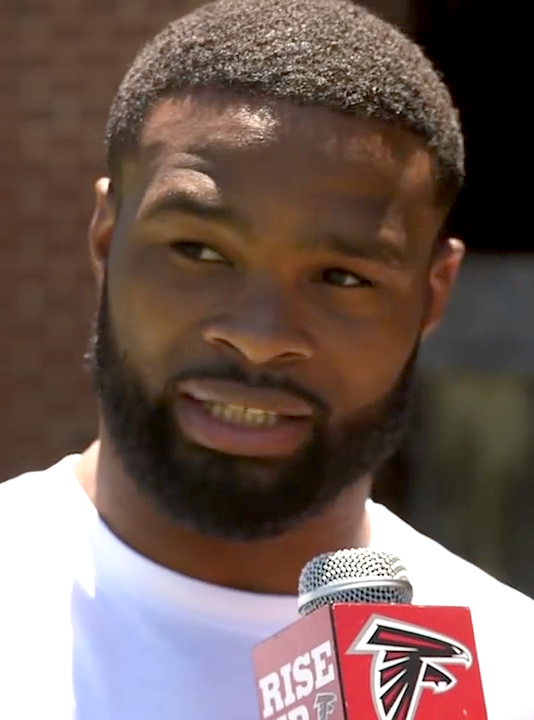
Jake Paul (left) and Tyron Woodley (right).

It was announced on October 29, 2021, that undefeated duo Jake Paul and Tommy Fury would be facing each other on December 18, less than four months after Fury had made his U.S. debut on the undercard of Paul's bout against mixed martial artist and former UFC Welterweight Champion Tyron Woodley on August 29. The bout was slated to be contested at a limit of 192 lbs under the cruiserweight division and aired live on Showtime PPV in the United States similarly to Paul-Woodley.

On November 5, 2021, a few details of the undercard were announced, as Paul teammate and former Tommy Fury opponent Anthony Taylor was announced to be taking on Nate Diaz's teammate Chris Avila in a fight at 168-pounds for eight rounds. Also announced for the undercard was former NBA player Deron Williams in a fight against former NFL player Frank Gore.

On December 6, 2021, Fury pulled out of the bout due to a bacterial chest infection and a broken rib, and was replaced by Tyron Woodley, who faced Paul in a rematch after losing a split decision to him back in August. The rematch was contested over eight rounds at a limit of 192 lbs under the cruiserweight division. On December 18, 2021, Jake Paul won the rematch by KO, 2 minutes and 12 seconds into the 6th round.

== Fight card ==
Weight class		vs.		Method	Round	Time	Notes
Cruiserweight	(United States) Jake Paul	def.	(United States) Tyron Woodley	KO	6/8	2:12
Lightweight	(Puerto Rico) Amanda Serrano	def.	(Spain) Miriam Gutiérrez	UD	10/10
Heavyweight	(United States) Deron Williams	def.	(United States) Frank Gore	SD	4/4		Exhibition bout
Light welterweight	(Australia) Liam Paro	def.	(Puerto Rico) Yomar Álamo	SD	10/10
Preliminary Card (Unaired)
Super middleweight	(United States) Chris Avila	def.	(United States) Anthony Taylor	MD	8/8
Cruiserweight	(United States) J'Leon Love	def.	(United States) Marcus Oliveira	UD	8/8
Welterweight	(United States) Jeovanny Estela	def.	(United States) Chris Rollins	UD	4/4

== Broadcasting ==
Country/Region	Broadcaster			
Country/Region	Free	Cable TV	PPV	Stream
United States (host)	—N/a		Showtime	
Australia	—N/a		Main Event, Kayo Sports	
Unsold markets	—N/a		FITE TV	
