= Tyron Woodley =

American mixed martial artist (born 1982)

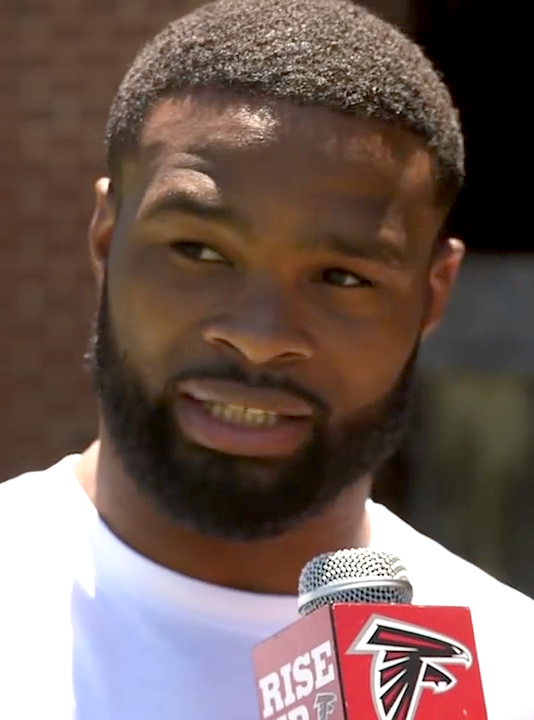
- Woodley in 2016
- Born: Tyron Lakent Woodley; April 7, 1982 (age 44); Ferguson, Missouri, U.S.
- Nickname: The Chosen One
- Height: 5 ft 9 in (175 cm)
- Weight: 170 lb (77 kg; 12 st)
- Division: Welterweight (MMA); Cruiserweight (boxing)
- Stance: Orthodox
- Fighting out of: St. Louis, Missouri, U.S.
- Team: Roufusport; American Top Team; ATT Evolution
- Rank: Black belt in Brazilian Jiu-Jitsu under Din Thomas
- Wrestling: NCAA Division I Wrestling
- Years active: 2006–2021 (MMA); 2021 (boxing)

Professional boxing record
- Total: 3
- Wins: 0
- Losses: 3
- By knockout: 2

Mixed martial arts record
- Total: 27
- Wins: 19
- By knockout: 7
- By submission: 5
- By decision: 7
- Losses: 7
- By knockout: 2
- By submission: 1
- By decision: 4
- Draws: 1

Amateur record
- Total: 7
- Wins: 7
- Losses: 0

Other information
- University: University of Missouri
- Boxing record from BoxRec
- Mixed martial arts record from Sherdog
Medal record
Men's collegiate wrestling
Representing the Missouri Tigers
Big 12 Championships
Gold medal – first place	2003 Columbia	165 lb

Tyron Lakent Woodley (born April 7, 1982) is an American professional mixed martial artist and professional boxer. He is a former UFC Welterweight Champion who defended his title four times. A professional since 2009, Woodley also competed at Strikeforce and was an NCAA Division I collegiate wrestler for the Missouri Tigers, becoming a two-time All-American and Big 12 Conference champion.

== Early life ==
Woodley was born and raised in Ferguson, Missouri. The first of thirteen children, he was raised by his mother after his father left the family early in his life. In high school, he was a two-sport athlete, competing in American football and amateur wrestling. Woodley won the Missouri 4A State Wrestling Championship in 2000, at the 160 lb weight class.

After graduating from McCluer High School in 2000, Woodley attended University of Missouri and joined their wrestling program. There, he became a two-time All-American; once in 2003 and again in 2005. Woodley graduated from the university in 2005 with a major in Agricultural Economics.

== Mixed martial arts career ==
Woodley fought his first professional fight on February 7, 2009 against Steve Schnider. It was held by Headhunter Productions at the Holiday Inn Select Executive Center in Columbia, Missouri. Woodley won via submission in the first round.

Woodley's second professional bout was against Jeff Carstens on April 30, 2009. He won the bout via submission in the first round.

=== Strikeforce ===
Woodley made his Strikeforce debut against Sal Woods in St. Louis, Missouri. The fight was at the event Strikeforce: Lawler vs. Shields on June 6, 2009. Woodley won the fight by submission late in round one. After the win, Strikeforce signed Woodley to a six-fight deal.

Woodley made his second appearance for Strikeforce on the Strikeforce Challengers: Kennedy vs. Cummings card. He defeated Zach Light via submission in the second round.

On the Strikeforce Challengers: Woodley vs. Bears card, Woodley had his third fight for Strikeforce, defeating Rudy Bears via arm-triangle submission.

Woodley's next bout was against Nathan Coy at Strikeforce Challengers: Lindland vs. Casey in Portland, Oregon. He won via split decision.

On October 9, 2010, at Strikeforce: San Jose, Woodley defeated André Galvão via knockout midway in the first round.

Woodley fought Tarec Saffiedine on January 7, 2011, in Nashville, Tennessee at Strikeforce Challengers: Woodley vs. Saffiedine. Woodley won the fight via unanimous decision. After the win, Woodley was signed to a contract extension with Strikeforce.

At Strikeforce: Fedor vs. Henderson, Woodley replaced Evangelista Santos and fought Paul Daley. Woodley defeated Daley via unanimous decision.

Woodley then fought Canadian prospect Jordan Mein at Strikeforce: Rockhold vs. Jardine. Woodley won via split decision.

Woodley faced Nate Marquardt on July 14, 2012, at Strikeforce: Rockhold vs. Kennedy for the vacant Strikeforce Welterweight Championship. He lost the fight via KO in the fourth round.

=== Ultimate Fighting Championship ===
==== Debut ====
Woodley faced Jay Hieron on February 2, 2013, at UFC 156 in his promotional debut, replacing an injured Erick Silva. Woodley won the fight via KO at just 36 seconds of the opening round.

Woodley faced Jake Shields on June 15, 2013, at UFC 161. Woodley lost the fight via split decision.

Woodley next faced off against Josh Koscheck at UFC 167 on November 16, 2013. He won the fight via knockout in the first round. The win also earned him his first Knockout of the Night bonus award.

Woodley next faced former Interim Welterweight Champion Carlos Condit at UFC 171. Woodley won via TKO after Condit suffered a knee injury in the second round.

On April 8, 2014, Woodley's new eight-fight contract with the UFC was announced alongside his match against Rory MacDonald at UFC 174. He lost the fight via unanimous decision.

Woodley next faced Dong Hyun Kim on August 23, 2014, at UFC Fight Night 48, replacing Héctor Lombard. He won the fight via TKO early in the first round. The win also earned Woodley his first Performance of the Night bonus award.

Woodley faced Kelvin Gastelum on January 31, 2015, at UFC 183 in a catchweight bout after Gastelum failed to make the welterweight limit. He won the fight via split decision.

Woodley was expected to face Johny Hendricks on October 3, 2015, at UFC 192. It was announced on October 2, 2015, that Hendricks was forced out of the fight due to complications with weight cutting.

==== UFC Welterweight Championship ====
Woodley faced welterweight champion Robbie Lawler on July 30, 2016, in the main event at UFC 201. He won the fight via knockout halfway through the first round to claim the UFC Welterweight Championship. This win earned him the Performance of the Night award.

Woodley made his first title defense against Stephen Thompson on November 12, 2016, at UFC 205. The fight ended in a majority draw with two judges scoring the fight 47–47 and the third 48–47 in favor of Woodley. Subsequently, both fighters were awarded Fight of the Night bonus awards.

The rematch with Thompson took place on March 4, 2017, in the main event at UFC 209. It was another closely contested bout with Woodley winning via majority decision.

For his third title defense, Woodley faced Demian Maia on July 29, 2017, in the co-main event at UFC 214. He won the fight by unanimous decision. Woodley stated after the contest that he had torn his labrum in his right shoulder in the opening round. Woodley would later have reconstructive surgery to repair the damage.

Woodley next defended the UFC Welterweight Championship against Darren Till on September 8, 2018, at UFC 228. He won the fight via submission in the second round. This win earned him the Performance of the Night award. Woodley also received his Brazilian Jiu-Jitsu black belt in the cage from Din Thomas following his victory. Woodley also gave Till his first loss in MMA.

In the fifth defense of his welterweight title, Woodley faced Kamaru Usman on March 2, 2019, in the co-main event at UFC 235. Woodley was dominated for the entire fight and lost by unanimous decision, ending his nearly three-year reign as welterweight champion.

==== Post-championship and career decline ====
A rematch with Robbie Lawler was expected to take place on June 29, 2019, at UFC on ESPN 3. On May 16, 2019, it was reported that Woodley suffered a hand injury and was pulled from the fight.

Woodley was scheduled to face Leon Edwards on March 21, 2020, at UFC Fight Night: Woodley vs. Edwards. However, the restrictions related to COVID-19 forced Edwards to withdraw as the event was meant to be moved from London to the United States, and the event was subsequently postponed indefinitely.

Woodley faced Gilbert Burns on May 30, 2020, in the main event at UFC on ESPN: Woodley vs. Burns. Woodley would again be dominated for most of the fight and lose via unanimous decision.

Woodley fought at UFC Fight Night: Covington vs. Woodley against longtime rival Colby Covington on September 19, 2020. Similar to his past two fights, Woodley was dominated for four rounds, and eventually the bout was called as a technical knockout after he tapped out during the fifth round due to a rib injury.

Woodley faced Vicente Luque on March 27, 2021, at UFC 260. Uncharacteristically, Woodley came out swinging aggressively early into the bout, and after rocking Luque and being rocked himself multiple times on the feet, he was defeated by D'Arce choke in round one. This fight earned him the Fight of the Night award. Weeks later, it was announced that Woodley had fought out his contract after eight years competing in the promotion.

==== Global Fight League ====
On December 11, 2024, it was announced that Woodley was signed by Global Fight League. On January 25, 2025 Woodley was drafted first. However, all GFL events were postponed indefinitely.

== Professional boxing career ==
=== Woodley vs. Paul ===
Before the Jake Paul vs. Ben Askren main event took place, Woodley was involved in a backstage situation with Jake Paul and J'Leon Love, where he was mocked due to his inexperience in boxing and the result of Paul's bout against Woodley's long–time teammate Ben Askren was discussed. After Paul knocked out Askren, Woodley called out Paul. On May 31, 2021, news surfaced that Woodley had been scheduled to make his professional boxing debut against internet personality Jake Paul on August 29, 2021. Woodley became the first man to take Paul past the second round in his professional career, but ultimately lost by split decision. One judge scored the fight 77–75 for Woodley, while the other two judges scored it 77–75 and 78–74 in favor of Paul.

=== Woodley vs. Paul II ===
On December 6, 2021, Woodley hopped in to replace Tommy Fury for a rematch with Jake Paul on December 18. After a back-and-forth bout, Woodley was knocked out in the sixth round. At the time of the stoppage, Woodley was behind on the scorecards 49–46 (twice) and 48–47.

=== Woodley vs. Silva ===
After a four-year hiatus, it was announced on December 4, 2025 that Woodley would face Anderson Silva on the undercard of Jake Paul vs. Anthony Joshua on December 19. Woodley lost the fight via technical knockout in the second round.

== Freestyle wrestling ==
Woodley made his debut in at RAF 12 on August 22, 2026 against Joaquin Buckley where he won in a 14-8 decision. This fight earned him Match of the Night award.

Woodley faced Khamzat Chimaev in the main event on September 5, 2026 at RAF Moscow. He lost by pinfall in the first round.

== Other ventures ==
Woodley has pursued acting in his spare time and played roles in both Straight Outta Compton, Kickboxer: Vengeance and Sultan, the latter being an Indian movie directed by Ali Abbas Zafar. He also appears in several fight scenes of Escape Plan 2: Hades. Woodley also appeared on Season 5 of the Netflix show Cobra Kai. On top of all of these other ventures, Woodley also appears in Season 3 Episode 5 of the Netflix show S.W.A.T. (2017 TV series) as a member of the Jamaican Posse.

Additionally, he hosts a podcast called "Morning Wood with Deez Nutz" and a weekly internet web show on TMZ called "The Hollywood Beatdown".

== Personal life ==
Tyron has four children. He has said that his goal is to open a non-profit facility for troubled youths one day. When his hometown of Ferguson, Missouri engaged in civil unrest after the shooting of Michael Brown, Woodley publicly condemned the rioting and lootings that took place. His favourite sport is basketball. Aside from being a natural-born American, Woodley also has citizenship from the United Arab Emirates.

== Championships and accomplishments ==
=== Mixed martial arts ===
- Ultimate Fighting Championship
  - UFC Welterweight Championship (One time)
    - Four successful title defenses
  - Knockout of the Night (One time) vs. Josh Koscheck
  - Performance of the Night (Three times) vs. Dong Hyun Kim, Robbie Lawler and Darren Till
  - Fight of the Night (Two times) vs. Stephen Thompson 1 and Vicente Luque
  - UFC.com Awards
    - 2013: Ranked #5 Import of the Year
    - 2016: Ranked #6 Fighter of the Year, Ranked #8 Knockout of the Year vs. Robbie Lawler & Ranked #5 Fight of the Year vs. Stephen Thompson 1
- Strikeforce
  - 2010 Rising Star of the Year
- CBS Sports
  - 2016 #5 Ranked UFC Fight of the Year vs. Stephen Thompson
  - 2017 #5 Ranked UFC Fighter of the Year

=== Wrestling ===
- Missouri State High School Activities Association
  - MSHSAA All-State (1999, 2000)
- National Collegiate Athletic Association
  - NCAA Division I All-American (2003, 2005)
  - Big 12 Conference Champion (2003)
- National High School Coaches Association
  - NHSCA Senior All-American (2000)
- Real Pro Wrestling
  - RPW 84 kg Northern Regional Championship (2006)
- USA Wrestling
  - United States University Freestyle National Championship Runner-up (2006)
- Real American Freestyle
  - Match of the Night (One time) vs. Joaquin Buckley

== Mixed martial arts record ==
Professional record breakdown
27 matches	19 wins	7 losses
By knockout	7	2
By submission	5	1
By decision	7	4
Draws	1	

Res.	Record	Opponent	Method	Event	Date	Round	Time	Location	Notes
Loss	19–7–1	Vicente Luque	Submission (brabo choke)	UFC 260	March 27, 2021	1	3:56	Las Vegas, Nevada, United States	Fight of the Night.
Loss	19–6–1	Colby Covington	TKO (rib injury)	UFC Fight Night: Covington vs. Woodley	September 19, 2020	5	1:19	Las Vegas, Nevada, United States	
Loss	19–5–1	Gilbert Burns	Decision (unanimous)	UFC on ESPN: Woodley vs. Burns	May 30, 2020	5	5:00	Las Vegas, Nevada, United States	
Loss	19–4–1	Kamaru Usman	Decision (unanimous)	UFC 235	March 2, 2019	5	5:00	Las Vegas, Nevada, United States	Lost the UFC Welterweight Championship.
Win	19–3–1	Darren Till	Submission (brabo choke)	UFC 228	September 8, 2018	2	4:19	Dallas, Texas, United States	Defended the UFC Welterweight Championship. Performance of the Night.
Win	18–3–1	Demian Maia	Decision (unanimous)	UFC 214	July 29, 2017	5	5:00	Anaheim, California, United States	Defended the UFC Welterweight Championship.
Win	17–3–1	Stephen Thompson	Decision (majority)	UFC 209	March 4, 2017	5	5:00	Las Vegas, Nevada, United States	Defended the UFC Welterweight Championship.
Draw	16–3–1	Stephen Thompson	Draw (majority)	UFC 205	November 12, 2016	5	5:00	New York City, New York, United States	Retained the UFC Welterweight Championship. Fight of the Night.
Win	16–3	Robbie Lawler	KO (punches)	UFC 201	July 30, 2016	1	2:12	Atlanta, Georgia, United States	Won the UFC Welterweight Championship. Performance of the Night.
Win	15–3	Kelvin Gastelum	Decision (split)	UFC 183	January 31, 2015	3	5:00	Las Vegas, Nevada, United States	Catchweight (180 lb) bout; Gastelum missed weight.
Win	14–3	Dong Hyun Kim	TKO (punches)	UFC Fight Night: Bisping vs. Le	August 23, 2014	1	1:01	Macau, SAR, China	Performance of the Night.
Loss	13–3	Rory MacDonald	Decision (unanimous)	UFC 174	June 14, 2014	3	5:00	Vancouver, British Columbia, Canada	
Win	13–2	Carlos Condit	TKO (leg injury)	UFC 171	March 15, 2014	2	2:00	Dallas, Texas, United States	
Win	12–2	Josh Koscheck	KO (punches)	UFC 167	November 16, 2013	1	4:38	Las Vegas, Nevada, United States	Knockout of the Night.
Loss	11–2	Jake Shields	Decision (split)	UFC 161	June 15, 2013	3	5:00	Winnipeg, Manitoba, Canada	
Win	11–1	Jay Hieron	KO (punches)	UFC 156	February 2, 2013	1	0:36	Las Vegas, Nevada, United States	
Loss	10–1	Nate Marquardt	KO (elbows and punches)	Strikeforce: Rockhold vs. Kennedy	July 14, 2012	4	1:39	Portland, Oregon, United States	For the vacant Strikeforce Welterweight Championship.
Win	10–0	Jordan Mein	Decision (split)	Strikeforce: Rockhold vs. Jardine	January 7, 2012	3	5:00	Las Vegas, Nevada, United States	
Win	9–0	Paul Daley	Decision (unanimous)	Strikeforce: Fedor vs. Henderson	July 30, 2011	3	5:00	Hoffman Estates, Illinois, United States	
Win	8–0	Tarec Saffiedine	Decision (unanimous)	Strikeforce Challengers: Woodley vs. Saffiedine	January 7, 2011	3	5:00	Nashville, Tennessee, United States	
Win	7–0	André Galvão	KO (punches)	Strikeforce: Diaz vs. Noons II	October 9, 2010	1	1:48	San Jose, California, United States	
Win	6–0	Nathan Coy	Decision (split)	Strikeforce Challengers: Lindland vs. Casey	May 21, 2010	3	5:00	Portland, Oregon, United States	
Win	5–0	Rudy Bears	Submission (arm-triangle choke)	Strikeforce Challengers: Woodley vs. Bears	November 20, 2009	1	2:52	Kansas City, Kansas, United States	
Win	4–0	Zach Light	Submission (armbar)	Strikeforce Challengers: Kennedy vs. Cummings	September 25, 2009	2	3:38	Bixby, Oklahoma, United States	
Win	3–0	Salvador Woods	Submission (brabo choke)	Strikeforce: Lawler vs. Shields	June 6, 2009	1	4:20	St. Louis, Missouri, United States	
Win	2–0	Jeff Carstens	Submission (rear-naked choke)	Respect Is Earned: Brotherly Love Brawl	April 30, 2009	1	0:48	Oaks, Pennsylvania, United States	
Win	1–0	Steve Schnider	TKO (submission to punches)	Headhunter Productions: The Patriot Act 1	February 7, 2009	1	1:09	Columbia, Missouri, United States	

== Professional boxing record ==
3 fights	0 wins	3 losses
By knockout	0	2
By decision	0	1

No.	Result	Record	Opponent	Type	Round, time	Date	Location	Notes
3	Loss	0–3	Anderson Silva	TKO	2 (6), 1:33	Dec 19, 2025	Kaseya Center, Miami, Florida. U.S.	
2	Loss	0–2	Jake Paul	KO	6 (8) 2:12	Dec 18, 2021	Amalie Arena, Tampa, Florida, U.S.	
1	Loss	0–1	Jake Paul	SD	8	Aug 29, 2021	Rocket Mortgage FieldHouse, Cleveland, Ohio, U.S.	

== Pay-per-view bouts ==
=== MMA ===
No.	Event	Fight	Date	Venue	City	PPV Buys
1	UFC 201	Lawler vs Woodley	July 30, 2016	Philips Arena	Atlanta, Georgia, United States	240,000
2	UFC 209	Woodley vs Thompson 2	March 4, 2017	T-Mobile Arena	Las Vegas, Nevada, United States	300,000
3	UFC 228	Woodley vs Till	September 8, 2018	American Airlines Center	Dallas, Texas, United States	130,000
Total						670,000

=== Boxing ===
No.	Date	Fight	Billing	Buys	Network	Revenue
1	August 29, 2021	Paul vs. Woodley	—N/a	500,000	Showtime	$29,900,000
2	December 18, 2021	Paul vs. Woodley II	Leave No Doubt	200,000	Showtime	—N/a
Total				700,000		$29,900,000

== NCAA record ==
No.	Event	Fight	Date	Venue	City
NCAA Championships Matches
Res.	Record	Opponent	Score	Date	Event
2005 NCAA Championships 7th at 165 lbs
Loss	12–7	Matt Nagel	OT 2–4	March 17–19, 2005	2005 NCAA Division I National Championships
Win	12–6	Justin Nestor	MD 11–0	March 17–19, 2005	2005 NCAA Division I National Championships
Loss	11–6	Mark Perry	0–3	March 17–19, 2005	2005 NCAA Division I National Championships
Win	11–5	Mike Patrovich	6–1	March 17–19, 2005	2005 NCAA Division I National Championships
Win	10–5	Donny Reynolds	Fall	March 17–19, 2005	2005 NCAA Division I National Championships
2003 NCAA Championships 8th at 165 lbs
Loss	9–5	Frank Edwards	0–3	March 20–22, 2003	2003 NCAA Division I National Championships
Loss	9–4	Matt King	1–4	March 20–22, 2003	2003 NCAA Division I National Championships
Win	9–3	Noel Thompson	4–2	March 20–22, 2003	2003 NCAA Division I National Championships
Loss	8–3	Jacob Volkmann	0–4	March 20–22, 2003	2003 NCAA Division I National Championships
Win	8–2	Kevin Carr	12–5	March 20–22, 2003	2003 NCAA Division I National Championships
Win	7–2	Nick Nemeth	7–2	March 20–22, 2003	2003 NCAA Division I National Championships
2002 NCAA Championships at 165 lbs
Loss	6–2	Doc Vecchio	OT 8–10	March 21–23, 2002	2002 NCAA Division I National Championships
Win	3–1	Carl Fronhofer	5–4	March 21–23, 2002	2002 NCAA Division I National Championships
Win	2–1	Bill Boeh	12–7	March 21–23, 2002	2002 NCAA Division I National Championships
Loss	1–1	Mark Fee	Fall	March 21–23, 2002	2002 NCAA Division I National Championships
Win	1–0	Scott Roth	8–6	March 21–23, 2002	2002 NCAA Division I National Championships

== Filmography ==
Film
Year	Title	Role	Notes
2013	Fight Life	Himself	
2015	Straight Outta Compton	T-Bone	
2016	Sultan	Tyron	Wrestler
2016	Kickboxer: Vengeance	Fighter	
2016	The Evolution of Punk	Himself	Documentary mini-series; appeared in the final episode
2016	Breakout	Skinhead	
2017	Office Uprising	Mario	
2017	The Favorite	Nick	
2017	Escape Plan 2: Hades	Akala	
2020	Cut Throat City	Loser	
TBA	Road House 2	TBA	Post-production

Television
Year	Title	Role	Notes
2010	Bully Beatdown	Himself	Episode: "Hair Today, Gone Tomorrow"
2017	The Night Shift	Travis	Episode: "Do No Harm"
2019	Hawaii Five-0	Kalino (Gunman 1)	Episode: "E'ao lu'au a kualima" and "Offer Young Taro Leaves to"
2022	Cobra Kai	Sensei Odel	5 episodes

== See also ==
- List of male boxers
- List of male mixed martial artists
- List of mixed martial artists with professional boxing records
- List of multi-sport athletes
- List of UFC bonus award recipients
- List of UFC champions
- Ultimate Fighting Championship Pound for Pound rankings

Achievements
Preceded by Robbie Lawler	11th UFC Welterweight Champion; July 30, 2016 – March 2, 2019	Succeeded by Kamaru Usman
