= Jake Paul vs. Tyron Woodley =

2021 professional crossover boxing match

- Date: August 29, 2021
- Venue: Rocket Mortgage FieldHouse, Cleveland, Ohio, U.S.

Tale of the tape
Boxer	Jake Paul	Tyron Woodley
Nickname	The Problem Child	The Chosen One
Hometown	Cleveland, Ohio, U.S.	Ferguson, Missouri, U.S.
Pre-fight record	3–0 (3 KOs) (Professional); 1–0 (Amateur)	0–0 (Professional boxing); 19–7–1 (7 KOs) (MMA)
Age	24	39
Height	6 ft 1 in (1.85 m)	5 ft 9 in (1.75 m)
Weight	190 lb (86 kg)	189 1/2 lb (86 kg)
Style	Orthodox	Orthodox
Recognition		Former UFC welterweight champion

Result
- Paul wins via 8-round split decision (77-75, 78-74, 75-77)

Jake Paul vs. Tyron Woodley was a cruiserweight professional crossover boxing match contested between American YouTuber Jake Paul and American mixed martial artist Tyron Woodley. The bout took place at the Rocket Mortgage FieldHouse in Cleveland, Ohio August 29, 2021. The fight sold 500,000 PPV buys.

== Background ==
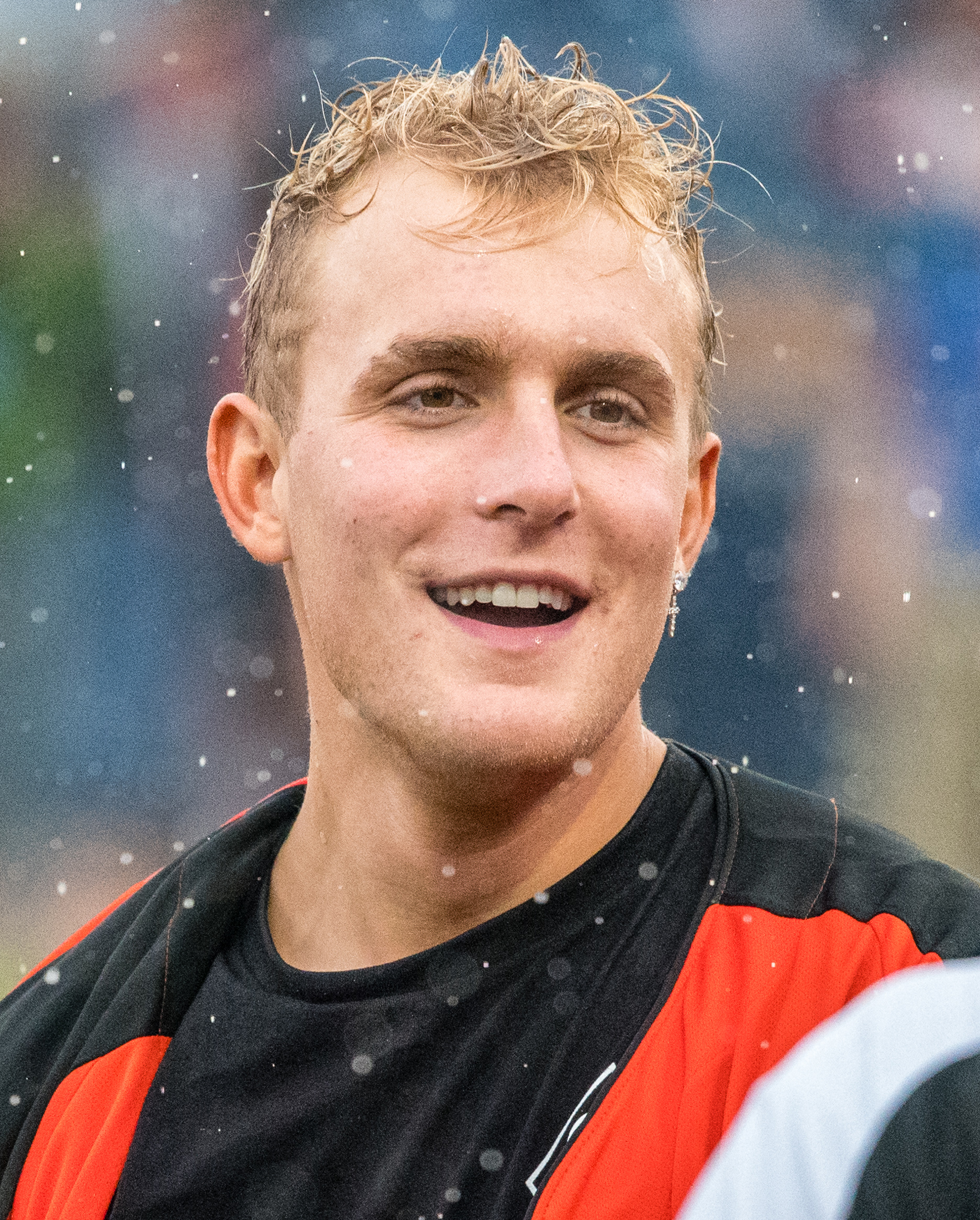
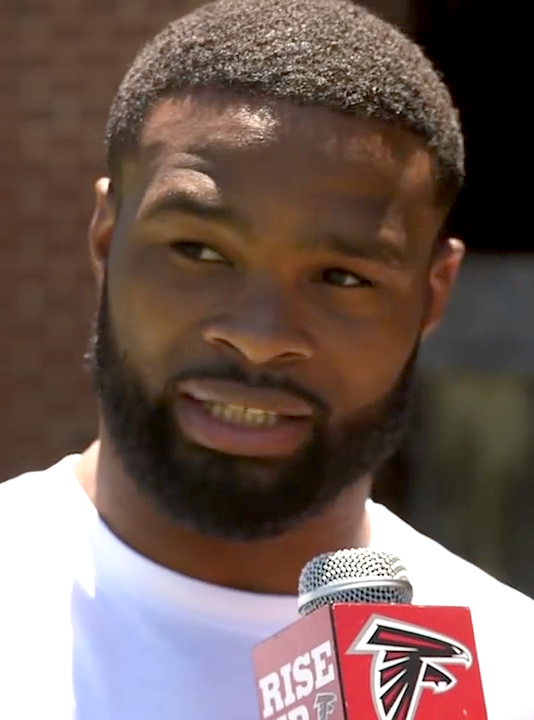
Jake Paul (left) and Tyron Woodley (right).

It was announced on May 20, 2021, that YouTuber-turned-professional boxer Jake Paul had signed a promotional deal with American television network Showtime, an agreement that would see his next bout aired on the network. His fight against former UFC Welterweight Champion Tyron Woodley was announced on July 12, 2021, with the venue and date set to be in Paul's hometown of Cleveland on August 29, 2021.

Prior to the bout, Paul had compiled a record of 3–0 (3 KOs) as a professional boxer, and was coming off a first-round technical knockout victory on April 17, 2021 against former mixed martial artist Ben Askren, who similar to Woodley had also previously competed in the UFC. For his part, Woodley made his debut as a professional boxer against Paul, and had most recently competed as a mixed martial artist on March 27, 2021, at UFC 260, when he suffered a first-round submission defeat against Vicente Luque. The defeat against Luque was Woodley's fourth consecutive loss as a mixed martial artist.

== Fight card ==
Weight Class		vs.		Method	Round	Time	Notes
Cruiserweight	(United States) Jake Paul	def.	(United States) Tyron Woodley	SD	8/8		^{Note 1}
Women's featherweight	(Puerto Rico) Amanda Serrano (c)	def.	(Mexico) Yamileth Mercado	UD	10/10		^{Note 2}
Heavyweight	(United Kingdom) Daniel Dubois	def.	(United States) Joe Cusumano	TKO	1/10	2:10
Light welterweight	(United States) Montana Love	def.	(Belarus) Ivan Baranchyk	RTD	7/10	3:00
Cruiserweight	(United Kingdom) Tommy Fury	def.	(United States) Anthony Taylor	UD	4/4

^Note 1 Woodley's professional debut
^Note 2 For WBC, WBO, and IBO female featherweight titles

== Broadcasting ==
Country/Region	Broadcaster			
Country/Region	Free	Cable TV	PPV	Stream
United States (host)	—N/a		Showtime	
United Kingdom	—N/a		BT Sport Box Office	
Ireland	—N/a		BT Sport Box Office	
Unsold markets	—N/a		FITE TV	

== Fight purses ==
According to the Ohio State Athletic Commission, both Paul and Woodley earned an official purse of $2,000,000. These figures don't include any additional bonuses or PPV profits.

Guaranteed base purses

- Jake Paul ($2,000,000) vs. Tyron Woodley ($2,000,000)
- Amanda Serrano ($75,000) vs. Yamileth Mercado ($45,000)
- Daniel Dubois ($100,000) vs. Joe Cusumano ($111,000)
- Montana Love ($60,000) vs. Ivan Baranchyk ($60,000)
- Tommy Fury ($15,000) vs. Anthony Taylor ($40,000)
- Charles Conwell ($80,000) vs. Juan Carlos Rubio ($20,000)

== Rematch ==
After the match, Jake Paul made a bet with Woodley that if he got the tattoo, they would have a rematch, Woodley later got the tattoo on his middle finger, and Jake responded with a piece of paper saying "I Love You Too." However, Paul instead called out Tommy Fury to a fight.

On October 29, 2021, it was announced that Jake was going to fight Tommy Fury. However, on December 6, it was announced that Fury pulled out due to a rib injury, and Tyron Woodley stepped in his place for a rematch.
