= Triller Inc. =

American multinational social media company

Triller, Inc.
- Formerly: TrillerNet; Triller Hold Co
- Type: Private
- Industry: Social media; Social network advertising; Combat sports
- Founded: July 23, 2015; 11 years ago in Los Angeles, California, U.S.
- Founders: David Leiberman; Sammy Rubin
- Headquarters: 2121 Avenue of the Stars, Los Angeles, California, U.S.
- Area served: Worldwide
- Key people: Mike Lu (President); Mahi de Silva (CEO); Lauren Braun Diamont (VP of Content & Strategy)
- Products: Triller; Triller TV
- Subsidiaries: BKFC; Flipps Media; Thuzio

Triller Inc. is an American company specializing in online video, social media, and combat sports. It is named after and is the owner of the social networking service Triller, which was launched in 2015 by co-founders David Leiberman and Sammy Rubin.

== History ==
The Triller app was launched in 2015. In April 2020, amid the COVID-19 pandemic, Triller organized a three-day streaming music festival known as "Trillerfest" in support of No Kid Hungry and the MusiCares COVID-19 Relief Fund. The event was headlined by Don Diablo, Marshmello, Migos, Pitbull, Snoop Dogg, and Wyclef Jean.

On March 9, 2021, Triller acquired Verzuz.

In June 2021, Triller partnered with Big3 to serve as a digital media partner for the league. This will include 30 hours of live games streaming within the Triller app (including exclusive coverage of the Big3 All-Star Game), coverage of the Big3 draft, social media presences, and courtside advertising.

On April 14, 2021, Triller acquired video streaming service FITE TV, and customer engagement service Amplify.at.

On November 22, 2021, Triller acquired influencer event firm Thuzio.

On December 22, 2021, Triller announced its intention to merge with SeaChange International and go public. Under the terms of the deal, Triller shareholders would own at least 97.7% of the combined company. The transaction is expected to close in the second quarter of 2022. It was later announced that the combined entity would be renamed TrillerVerz Company upon the merger's closure. On June 14, 2022, it was reported that Triller would back out of the merger with SeaChange in order to pursue an IPO without a merger

On February 24, 2022, Triller acquired a majority stake in the Bare Knuckle Fighting Championship.

== Triller Fight Club ==
=== Background ===
In July 2020, Triller announced that it had partnered with Mike Tyson's Legends Only League to become the media partner for its boxing events, with its inaugural event being an exhibition fight between Tyson and Roy Jones Jr. on November 28, 2020, distributed via pay-per-view. Triller would handle distribution of the fight to pay-per-view platforms and services such as Fite TV, and also carry a documentary miniseries leading into the fight. The PPV would not be carried within the Triller app itself due to its focus on short-form video, and a goal for wider distribution via traditional PPV outlets. Following the event, it was reported that the PPV had at least 1.6 million buys, surpassing UFC 251 as the most-bought combat sports PPV of 2020.

Ryan Kavanaugh, CEO of parent company Proxima Media, described the fight as being the launch of Triller's "high-end live events business", and explained that they aimed to reach audiences beyond core boxing fans by leveraging the present "cultural zeitgeist"; the PPV included a co-main event between internet celebrity and boxer Jake Paul and former NBA player Nate Robinson, music performances by acts such as Wiz Khalifa, and featured Snoop Dogg as a commentator. Kavanaugh later referred to this practice as a "four-quadrant" entertainment event, supplementing boxing with internet, music, and sports personalities.

=== Launch ===
In December 2020, Triller announced a partnership with Snoop Dogg to form Triller Fight Club—a "boxing league" that would be produced and hosted by Snoop Dogg, and consist of a series of annual PPV cards with "four-quadrant" elements carried over from the Tyson/Jones event. The first event under the banner was held on April 17, 2021, with a main event between Jake Paul and Ben Askren, and performances by The Black Keys, Diplo, Doja Cat, Justin Bieber, Major Lazer, Saweetie, and Mt. Westmore —a supergroup featuring Snoop, Ice Cube, Too Short and E-40. The event was held behind closed doors at Mercedes-Benz Stadium in Atlanta, with Triller intentionally limiting attendance to 100 spectators chosen via promotional contests on the Triller app; Kavanaugh described this as a "golden ticket" model supporting its goal to give home viewers a "front row" experience.

In February 2021, it was reported that Triller Fight Club had won a purse bid to promote the fight between Teófimo López and George Kambosos to defend López's unified lightweight titles, beating out Matchroom and Top Rank with a bid reported to be $6 million. Kavanaugh stated that the match would likely be a co-main event on a future card. In March 2021, Oscar De La Hoya announced a comeback fight during a planned card on July 3. In May 2021, Triller signed long-time HBO boxing personality Jim Lampley as its lead commentator; his role was expected to begin with Teófimo López vs. George Kambosos Jr. on June 19. However, after the López vs. Kambosos fight was postponed on multiple occasions, the International Boxing Federation ruled that Triller was in breach of their contractual obligation to stage the fight, subsequently awarding the rights to Matchroom as the second highest bidders.

== Controversies ==
In November 2021, Triller owner Ryan Kavanaugh publicized Triller Fight Club's new Triller Triad Combat with an open invitation to UFC president Dana White. The invitation, wreathed in a floral border, personally invited White to the event and offered an arranged tour and personalized autograph. Kavanaugh's targeted appeal to Dana White may have been connected with White's comments on Triller in May 2021 when he dismissed questions about Triller saying, "You think I care what Triller thinks? I don't even take their calls. This idiot calls me every day. He calls me every day: 'Please answer my call. Please talk to me. Why won't you talk to me?' Because I don't give a f*ck about you."

=== Lawsuits ===
Triller has filed lawsuits against several websites and a 19-year-old alleging illegal distribution of Jake Paul vs. Ben Askren, seeking $100 million and $150,000 respectively in damages. Following the dismissal of the $100 million suit as a misjoinder, Triller's subsidiary Triller Fight Club filed an amended complaint against the H3 Podcast, a video podcast native to YouTube, seeking $50 million in damages. The podcast's host Ethan Klein claims his inclusion of a 45-second clip of the event in one of his broadcasts constitutes fair use and alleges that Ryan Kavanaugh, a major stakeholder, has instigated the lawsuit "out of spite".

In November 2021, Triller was sued for infringing a design patent and registered copyright and trademark in the marketing of Triller Fight Club's Triad Combat.

On 16 August 2022, Swizz Beatz and Timbaland sued Triller, alleging that they are owed over $28 million related to the purchase of the webcast series Verzuz. Triller had bought Verzuz in January 2021 for an undisclosed sum. In September, Swizz and Timbaland reached an amicable agreement with Triller and the case was settled. By June 2024, Swizz and Timbaland would reacquire Verzuz and begin a partnership with Twitter.

== Assets ==
=== Streaming and Social ===
- Cliqz
- Triller
- TrillerTV (formally FITE)

=== Combat sports ===
- Bare Knuckle Fighting Championship
- Triller Fight Club

=== Other assets ===
A further list of brands and properties owned by Triller, Inc.

Current

- Thuzio
- Amplify.AI
- Fangage
- Crosshype
- Julius
- Flipps Media
- Metaverz

Former

- Verzuz
