= Jason Fader =

American medical missionary

Jason Fader is an American medical missionary who serves in the nation of Burundi. In 2016, Fader was the inaugural winner of the L'Chaim Prize for Outstanding Christian Medical Missionary Service. Fader has worked in Kenya. He currently serves as the assistant medical director for Kibuye Hope Hospital. With the 2016 L'Chaim Prize, Fader intends to build a new ward in the hospital, expand its current laboratories, and buy orthopedic equipment.

== Early life and education ==
Jason Fader was born in Kenya to Tim and Patti Fader, both medical missionaries. Fader graduated from the Rift Valley Academy in 1995, a school in Kenya for both local children and children whose parents are medical missionaries. The Rift Valley Academy was founded in 1906. In 1999 he graduated from Calvin College where his wife, Heather also attended. Fader got his MD from Loyola Stritch School of Medicine in 2003 and did his general surgery residency at Saint Joseph Mercy Hospital in Ann Arbor, Michigan. At the time, Saint Joseph Mercy Hospital had 529 beds and was an independently run academic medical center. At Saint Joseph Mercy Hospital, the general surgery residency program director, Seth Wolk, worked to provide Fader with the extra training he would need to serve as a medical missionary in Africa. He created an individualized program that included an additional sixth year dedicated to training that would support him in Africa. The Saint Joseph Mercy Hospital allowed its students to spend a month of their general surgery residency in a rural United States location. Fader was able to spend this month at the Kijabe Hospital in Kenya, which was a medical missionary hospital.

== Missionary work ==
While studying in Michigan, Fader and his wife met two other families at the Knox Presbyterian Church and together they formed a medical missionary team. After finishing his residency, Fader moved back to Kenya. He worked at the Tenwek Mission Hospital in Bomet, Kenya, roughly 4 hours outside of Nairobi. The Tenwek Hospital, at the time, had 308 beds and served roughly 600,000 people in Kenya. The Tenwek hospital had three general surgeons, one orthopedic surgeon, and one gynecologist. Fader moved to Burundi in 2013. As of 2017, Burundi had 14 surgeons for 10 million people. In Burundi, Fader works as a clinical faculty member at the Hope Africa University's Medical School. In addition to working as a teacher, Fader also serves as the assistant medical director at Kibuye Hope Hospital. Both Hope Africa University and the Kibuye Hope Hospital are located outside of Bujumbura (Burundi's largest city and former capital). Fader has been working to train doctors, perform surgeries, and upgrade and expand medical facilities. Each missionary with Fader is tasked with raising individual financial support and is required to speak both French and Kirundi.

== L'Chaim Prize for Outstanding Medical Missionary Service ==
The L'Chaim Prize for Outstanding Medical Missionary Service was founded by Jewish philanthropist and businessman, Marc Gerson and his wife Erica Gerson, a rabbi. The L'Chaim Prize is a $500,000 grant aimed to award medical missionaries for their service and help them fund their mission. The African Mission Healthcare Foundation (AMHF) oversees the award and it is the largest ever monetary award for clinical care. Fader intended to use the prize money to build a new ward in the Kibuye Hope Hospital, buy orthopedic equipment for surgeries, and expand laboratories at the Hope Africa University Medical School. He also intended to create Burundi's first ever medical internship program and build additional housing for medical staff. The award would add 48 new beds to the existing 172-bed Kibuye Hope Hospital. In 2015, the Kibuye Hope Hospital had a total operating budget of $526,000, which is almost the same price as the overall L'Chaim Prize. In 2015, the hospital took care of 25,000 outpatients, 10,000 inpatients, 1,200 surgeries, and 800 cataract cases.

== Publications ==
- Fader, Jason; Charles, Anthony; Domingo, Shirley; Goldfadden, Aaron; Lampmann, Richard; Mazzeo, Robert (March 2005). "Small Bowel Ischemia After Roux-en-Y Gastric Bypass Complicated by Pregnancy: A Case Report". The American Surgeon. 71 (3): 231–234(4). doi:10.1177/000313480507100312. PMID 15869139. S2CID 25030777.
- Fader, Jason; Wolk, Seth (July–August 2009). "Training General Surgeons to Practice in Developing World Nations and Rural Areas of the United States—One Residency Program's Model". Journal of Surgical Education. 66 (4): 225–227. doi:10.1016/j.jsurg.2009.06.008. PMID 19896629.
- Fader, Jason; Cleary, Robert; Lampman, Richard; Winter, Suzanne; Singal, Bonita; Plona, Alan (January 2011). "Does Intrathecal Morphine Sulfate Provide Preemptive analgesia for Patients Undergoing Stapled Hemorrhoidopexy?". Pain Medicine. 12 (2): 322–327. doi:10.1111/j.1526-4637.2010.01042.x. PMID 21266003. S2CID 31174066.
