= Mark Gerson =

American businessman

Mark Gerson is an American investor, businessman, and philanthropist. He co-founded numerous businesses including the Gerson Lehrman Group (GLG), Thuzio and 3i Members. Gerson is also involved in several philanthropic organizations having co-founded African Mission Healthcare Foundation and United Hatzalah.

Gerson grew up in the Short Hills neighborhood of Millburn, New Jersey and attended Millburn High School. Gerson received a BA from Williams College and a JD from Yale Law School.

== Business ==
Gerson and fellow Yale Law School graduate Thomas Lehrman founded the Gerson Lehrman Group in 1998. Gerson Lehrman Group, otherwise known as GLG, is a peer to peer business learning company. GLG is a knowledge brokerage and primary research firm with a stated membership-based platform of more than 600,000 independent consultants.

Gerson also co-founded Thuzio, a professional booking marketplace, with former NFL player Tiki Barber, and Create, a venture studio.

Most recently, Gerson co-founded 3i Members, a selective network of private investors who share curated investment opportunities that come from the membership, do collective diligence and are in community with each other through several hundred events a year and a variety of other channels.

== Philanthropy ==
Gerson is the co-founder and chairman of United Hatzalah, a network of over 8000 volunteer medics in Israel. United Hatzalah's volunteers come from every segment of Israeli society-- Jewish, Christian, Muslim, Druze, and people who espouse no faith. United Hatzalah is committed to treating everyone regardless of race, religion, national origin, or ethnicity.

Gerson also co-founded African Mission Healthcare Foundation with Dr. Jon Fielder in 2010. The Foundation seeks to improve access to medical care in Africa. AMHF supports the work of Christian medical missionaries serving in Africa in three areas: clinical care, training and infrastructure.

AMHF has forged partnerships with Christian Broadcasting Network and Samaritan's Purse

As part of AMHF, Gerson helped create the Gerson L'Chaim Prize in August 2016.

In September 2021 Gerson donated US$18 million to Christian medical missions in Africa.

=== L'Chaim Prize for Outstanding Medical Missionary Service ===
The L'Chaim Prize for Outstanding Medical Missionary Service was founded by Gerson and his wife Erica Gerson. The L'Chaim Prize is a $500,000 grant aimed to award medical missionaries for their service and help them fund their mission. Due to the rise in independent churches, Gerson believed that there was a shortage of medical missionaries and believed this prize would help the field. The prize's name, L'Chaim, means "to life" in Hebrew.

==== Recipients ====
Year	Applicants	Recipient	Nationality	Country of Service	Intended Use
2016	26	Jason Fader, MD	American	Burundi (Kibuye Hope Hospital)	Expand hospital and laboratories, purchase orthopedic equipment
2017	24	Russel E. White, MD	American	Kenya (Tenwek Mission Hospital)	Train cardiac surgeons, implement ultrasound, purchase antibiotics
2018		Rick Sacra, MD	American	Liberia (ELWA Hospital)	Train Liberian Family Medicine Physicians, install solar capacity, establish ICUs
2019		Tom Catena, MD	American	Sudan (Mother of Mercy Hospital)	to strengthen and expand the Gidel Mother of Mercy Hospital
2020		Priscilla Busingye, MD	Ugandan	Uganda (Banyatereza Sisters of Uganda)	She ‘loves the stranger’ every day in a genuine and tangible manner
2021		William Rhodes, MD	American	Kenya (Kapsowar Hospital)	Train teams of surgical care providers for "surgical deserts"

== Media ==
In 2020, Gerson launched his podcast The Rabbi's Husband with Mark Gerson, where he interviewed a number of prominent figures to discuss religious, political and theological perspectives on passages from the Bible. His guests have included United States Senators Cory Booker, Tom Cotton, William Cassidy, Israeli author Yossi Klein Halevi, speechwriter Sarah Hurwitz and Bishop Robert Stearns. He hosts a popular weekly Bible study with Eagles Wings, an international Christian organization supporting Israel initiatives.

He is the author of the national best-selling book The Telling: How Judaism's Essential Book Reveals the Meaning of Life (St. Martins Publishing Group, March 2, 2021) and The Telling Workbook: An Interactive Guide to the Haggadah (St. Martins Publishing Group, March 8, 2022). His upcoming book God Was Right: How Modern Social Science Proves the Torah is True (BenBella Books, June 3, 2025) examines the Torah's social-science claims in light of modern scientific research.

== Politics ==
Gerson authored several other books including The Neoconservative Vision: From the Cold War to the Culture Wars (ISBN 1568330545) and In the Classroom: Dispatches from an Inner-City School that Works (ISBN 0684827565), and served as editor of The Essential Neoconservative Reader (ISBN 0201479680).

He is active politically, with most support going to Republican candidates. In 2015, Gerson joined other Republicans in signing an amicus curiae brief supporting a constitutional right to same-sex marriage, which was submitted to the Supreme Court in Obergefell v. Hodges.
