= Ernie Steury =

Ernest Millard Steury (January 3, 1930 – April 4, 2002) was an American physician and Christian missionary to Kenya.

Steury was born in Berne, Indiana to David and Mary Habegger Steury. In 1948, while attending a church service in his hometown, Steury became a Christian. Though he didn't know it at the time, that decision set his life on a course that would lead him far from the rural Indiana life he'd known. Steury's first step outside Indiana took him to Asbury College in Wilmore, Kentucky. He graduated from Asbury in 1953 and the following year married Jennie Sue Groce. Steury obtained a medical degree from Indiana University School of Medicine in 1957 and began an internship in tropical medicine at Gorgas Hospital, Panama.

In 1956, while still a medical student, Steury signed on with World Gospel Mission and in 1959 was sent to the organization's mission station at Tenwek Mission Hospital, Kenya. Begun in 1935 as an aide station, the Tenwek facility had grown into a medical dispensary and clinic, but Steury was the station's first physician. With Steury's leadership, the clinic developed into one of Kenya's largest missionary hospitals with outlying clinics that brought healthcare to the surrounding community. The facility attained a global reputation for its work.

Steury died at Avon Park, Florida, in 2002. In 2003 Dr Steury Memorial Primary School was built in Tenwek, Bomet County Kenya in his honour.
