= Sophie Watts =

British-born media and technology executive

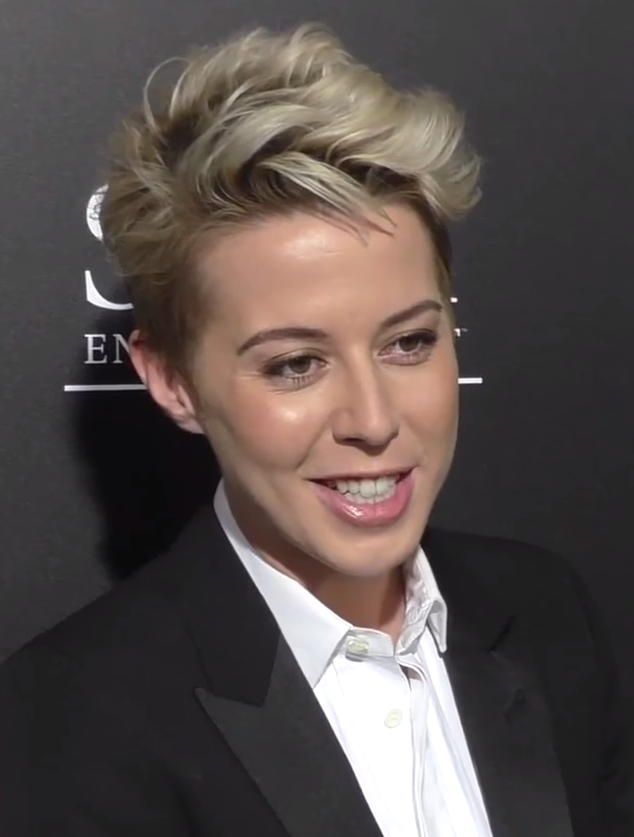
- Watts in 2016
- Born: London, England
- Education: Gonville and Caius College, University of Cambridge
- Occupations: Media and technology executive, entrepreneur
- Known for: Founding President of STX Entertainment

Sophie Watts (born in 1985) is a British-born media and technology executive and entrepreneur. She is best known as the founding President of STX Entertainment, where she helped build the company from inception into a global film and television studio valued at more than US$2 billion during her tenure. Her work has spanned film, television, and digital content, live events, and technology-related media ventures.

== Personal life ==
Watts was born in London, England, the daughter of music video and music film producer Tessa Watts - one of the pioneers of the music video industry at Virgin Records - and rock journalist and newspaper editor Michael Watts. She grew up in London and Bedfordshire and attended Gonville and Caius College at the University of Cambridge. She graduated with First-Class Honours (summa cum laude) in History (MA, specializing in Economic History), and was awarded recognition as a Senior Scholar of her college.

== Early career ==
Early in her career, Watts worked in music film production with artists including Sir Paul McCartney, Sir Elton John, U2, Beyoncé, Madonna, and Mariah Carey. She moved to Los Angeles in 2007, where she was a producer and financier on film projects including the documentary Bully. The film was awarded the Producers Guild of America (PGA) Stanley Kramer award in 2013, honoring productions and individuals that “illuminate and raise public awareness of important social issues.” By 2014, the film had been viewed by over 3.5 million secondary students across the United States.

== STX Entertainment ==
In 2011, Watts started working with Robert "Bob" Simonds to build STX Entertainment, a film and television studio that would “make, market and distribute star-driven, commercial" content. The company was incubated with capital from TPG Growth and later secured investment from Hony Capital, Tencent, PCCW, Liberty Global, and other institutional investors. In 2014, STX announced that it had secured over $1 billion in financing.

As president, Watts helped oversee the company’s expansion across film, television, digital, and international markets. Under her leadership, STX released films including Bad Moms, Molly's Game, and The Foreigner. In 2016, STXfilms became the fastest studio that year to hit $100-million at the domestic box office with Bad Moms, a People's Choice award winner for best comedy, garnered a Golden Globe nomination for Hailee Steinfeld in The Edge of Seventeen, and procured DGA Best New Director nominations for multiple films. Under Watts, the studio worked with talent including Julia Roberts, Mila Kunis, Amy Schumer, Vin Diesel, Charlize Theron, Gerard Butler, Guy Ritchie, Mark Wahlberg, Jessica Chastain, Will Smith, and Jennifer Lopez.

During Watts's tenure, STX Entertainment grew from inception into a media conglomerate which, based on preliminary paperwork for its planned initial public offering, valued the company at over US$2 billion.

Watts stepped down from her executive role in 2018, citing a desire to focus on new technology and media business models, but continuing as a shareholder of and advisor to the studio. STX co-founder Robert Simonds praised Watts as "a force of nature...[an] incredibly talented, versatile executive who has been central to every aspect of growing the company, both domestically and internationally, from inception to the multi-billion-dollar endeavor it is today."

== Later ventures and technology work ==
Following her departure from STX, Watts has worked across media, sports, and technology ventures.

In July 2020, she co-founded Mike Tyson's Legends Only League, which initial publicity described as a "next-generation sports venture that provides full support and infrastructure to the world's greatest athletes." As of 2026, the only event organised by the venture took place in November 2020. The live event, which Watts produced, included a fight between Mike Tyson and Roy Jones Jr. (billed as Mike Tyson vs. Roy Jones Jr.), and Jake Paul as a co-headliner in his fight against Nate Robinson, at the Staples Center in November 2020.

In 2024, Watts co-founded Radical Tempo, an AI agent powered platform which advised content creators on how to most effectively distribute their content online. The project was described in Adweek as combining “Hollywood and Silicon Valley” approaches to content creation and distribution.

Watts continues to advise and support companies operating at the intersection of media and technology, including businesses focused on artificial intelligence, digital distribution, and emerging content monetization models. Her holdings are maintained under SW Group (SWG), of which she is founder and CEO.

== Boards and recognition ==
Watts has served on boards including BAFTA LA, The Trevor Project, and Ryff.

She has been named to Fortune's 40 under 40, Variety’s Women’s Impact Report and Dealmakers Impact Report, The Hollywood Reporter’s Women in Entertainment Power 100, Variety500, and the National Diversity Council's "Top 50 Most Powerful Women in Entertainment."
