= Triller (app) =

American social networking service

- Triller logo
- Developer: Triller Inc.
- Release: July 23, 2015; 11 years ago
- Stable release: 49.1 / May 4, 2023; 3 years ago
- Operating system: Android, iOS
- Size: 173.1 MB (iOS); 127 MB (Android)
- Type: Video sharing
- Website: triller.co (Archived at the Wayback Machine)

Triller was an American video-sharing social networking service that was first released for iOS and Android in 2015. The service allowed users to create and share short-form videos, including videos set to, or automatically synchronized to, music using artificial intelligence technology. It initially operated as a video editing app before adding social networking features.

Triller gained prominence in 2020 as a competitor to the similar Chinese-owned app TikTok, mainly in the United States and India (after the service was banned in the latter country). The app's success would allow its parent company to expand into sports broadcasting and promotion; including the distribution of pay-per-view boxing events under the Triller Fight Club banner (such as Mike Tyson vs. Roy Jones Jr. and Jake Paul vs. Ben Askren) that incorporated live music performances and appearances by various celebrities and entertainment personalities. As of August 2026, all online services in the app no longer function and it is no longer available to download from the App Store.

== History ==
=== Launch and early years ===
Triller was launched in 2015 by co-founders David Leiberman and Sammy Rubin. The app was originally positioned as a video editor, using artificial intelligence to automatically edit distinct clips into music videos. Development was conducted initially by in-house developers and later by a Portuguese tech partner eyenov. They later launched Triller Famous, a page within the app that featured curated selections of user videos.

In 2016, the app was purchased by Carnegie Technologies and converted into a social networking service by allowing users to follow each other and share their videos publicly. In 2019, Ryan Kavanaugh's Proxima Media made a majority investment. It is headquartered in Los Angeles, California, and is currently led by CEO Mahi de Silva.

=== Media exposure and controversies ===
On June 29, 2020, Government of India banned TikTok, among other apps stating that they were "prejudicial to [the] sovereignty and integrity" of India. Triller, which had planned to enter into the Indian market by the end of 2020, saw a spike from less than 1 million users to over 30 million users in the country overnight.

In July 2020, Triller sued ByteDance, the Chinese parent company of TikTok, for infringing patents relating to video editing. In response, TikTok and ByteDance filed a lawsuit against Triller, alleging the litigation initiated by Triller had "cast a cloud" over TikTok's reputation and business dealings.

That Summer, U.S. president Donald Trump signed an executive order which threatened to ban TikTok from operating within the United States, citing threats to national security, unless it was sold by ByteDance. The Trump administration stated that TikTok had until November 12, 2020, to assure the administration that the app did not pose any national security threats to the U.S. Following this order and news of possible purchases of TikTok's American operations by companies such as Oracle, Triller jumped from number 198 to number one in the App Store in the U.S., while TikTok dropped down to number three. The discussions surrounding TikTok's potential ban in the United States caused popular TikTok stars, including Charli D’Amelio and her family, to join Triller. Trump joined Triller himself and posted his first video on August 15, 2020. The video received over a million views within hours.

On August 12, 2020, Triller partnered with B2B music company 7digital, which will provide Triller with access to its catalogue of 80 million tracks and automatically report usage data to Sony Music, Warner Music Group, Universal Music Group and Merlin Network.

The number of Triller's app installations came under scrutiny when third-party analytics firm Apptopia estimated only 52 million lifetime installations of the app by August 2020, while Triller claimed 250 million. Triller threatened to sue Apptopia for publishing the report. By October 2020, Triller claimed to serve 100 million active monthly users, but this number was quickly disputed by six former employees interviewed by Business Insider. Within a few weeks of Triller's claim, employees shared screenshots of the company's internal analytics that showed less than 2.5 million active monthly users.

On October 2, 2020, Triller signed licensing deals with the rights societies PRS for Music, GEMA, STIM and IMRO, and the publishers Concord, Downtown and Peermusic.

On February 5, 2021, Universal Music Group (UMG) pulled its library from Triller, citing unpaid music royalties. They alleged that Triller "shamefully withheld payments owed to our artists" and refused to negotiate future music licensing. Triller responded with the assertion that "relevant artists" were already partnered with Triller, so a deal with UMG was unnecessary. The two companies reached an expanded licensing agreement in May 2021.

On March 24, 2021, Triller signed a licensing agreement with the National Music Publishers' Association.

=== Current state ===
Since July 2025 to present date, the app lost most of its core functionality, particularly the ability to sign in and view other users content. However, the app still allows users to record and save their own videos while remaining unavailable for download on the App Store.

On December 30, 2025, the company was delisted from the NASDAQ stock exchange after failing to submit their annual and quarterly reports.

== Features ==
The Triller app allows users to create music videos, skits, and lip-sync videos containing background music. The app's spotlight feature is its special auto-editing tool, which uses artificial intelligence to automatically stitch separate video clips together without the user having to do it themselves. The separate video clips are created to the same background music, but users are able to shoot multiple takes with different filters or edits each time. Once the auto-editing tool stitches the individual clips together, users can rearrange and replace clips as desired. Users can also customize videos by applying filters and text.

When creating a video, users can choose to make a "music video" or a "social video". A "music video" allows users to add music and trim the audio to personal preference. Unlike the music video option, a "social video" does not require the user to add music in the background. The app's auto-editing tool is only used when making music videos, as it uses the background track to help arrange and synchronize the clips. Users can also link their accounts with Apple Music or Spotify to integrate their playlists.

Incomplete videos that are yet to be shared appear in a user's "Projects" folder. Once finalized, a video can be shared with other users of the app or through social media platforms such as Facebook, Instagram, Twitter (X), WhatsApp, and YouTube. Any video on Triller can also be downloaded or shared through links, text messages, or direct messaging to other users within the app.

The app is divided into three video feeds, consisting of videos from creators that the user follows, the "Social" feed (which showcases trending videos and those by verified users), and the "Music" feed (which exclusively features music videos).

Triller accounts can be made either public or private. When the account is public, any user can view the videos on that account. When the account is private, only approved users can view the videos on that account. Users with private accounts can change the privacy settings of individual videos on their accounts from private to public, making the selected videos viewable to anyone on the app. In accordance with online child privacy laws in the United States, children under the age of 13 must receive parental consent in order to create an account on Triller.

== User characteristics and behavior ==
In August 2020, Triller reported that it had been downloaded over 250 million times worldwide with average rating of 4.00. Mobile analytics firm Apptopia disputed the numbers and claimed they were inflated, suggesting that the app had only been downloaded 52 million times since it first launched in 2015. Apptopia pulled the report after Triller threatened to sue the company.

The app has been downloaded 23.8 million times in the U.S., with users spending an average of more than 20 minutes per day. A large number of downloads come from India, where TikTok has been banned, as well as from various European and African countries.

In October 2020, Triller CEO Mike Lu stated that the app has 100 million monthly active users (MAU). In February 2021, Billboard reported that Triller had "reported higher numbers of monthly active users to the public than it reports to [music] rights holders." CEO Lu argued that "there is no legal definition" of monthly and daily active users, and that "if someone is trying to compare TikTok's MAU/DAU to ours—which means they are saying we have the same definition of MAU/DAU—there is an inherent misunderstanding about Triller's business and business model. It’s like trying to compare a fish and a bicycle." In a public statement, Lu denied that the company had inflated its user metrics.

Triller has attracted celebrity users like Chance the Rapper, Yeat, Snoop Dogg, Juice Wrld, Ice Spice, Lil Keed, DaBaby, King Von, LIl Tecca, Lil Mosey, Justin Bieber, Marshmello, The Weeknd, Alicia Keys, Cardi B, Eminem, Post Malone and Kevin Hart. The app is also used by TikTok stars such as Charli D’Amelio, Josh Richards, Noah Beck, Griffin Johnson, and Dixie D’Amelio. Triller has offered large sums of money, company equity, and advisory roles to encourage prominent TikTok users to move to Triller, such as The Sway Boys. Sway House member Josh Richards became the Chief Strategy Officer of Triller after concerns regarding user data motivated him to find a "safe place" for himself and his followers.

== See also ==
- Triller (company)
- List of social networking services
- Timeline of social media
- Likee
- Once
- Huddles
