= Matt Higgins (businessman) =

American businessman (born c. 1974)

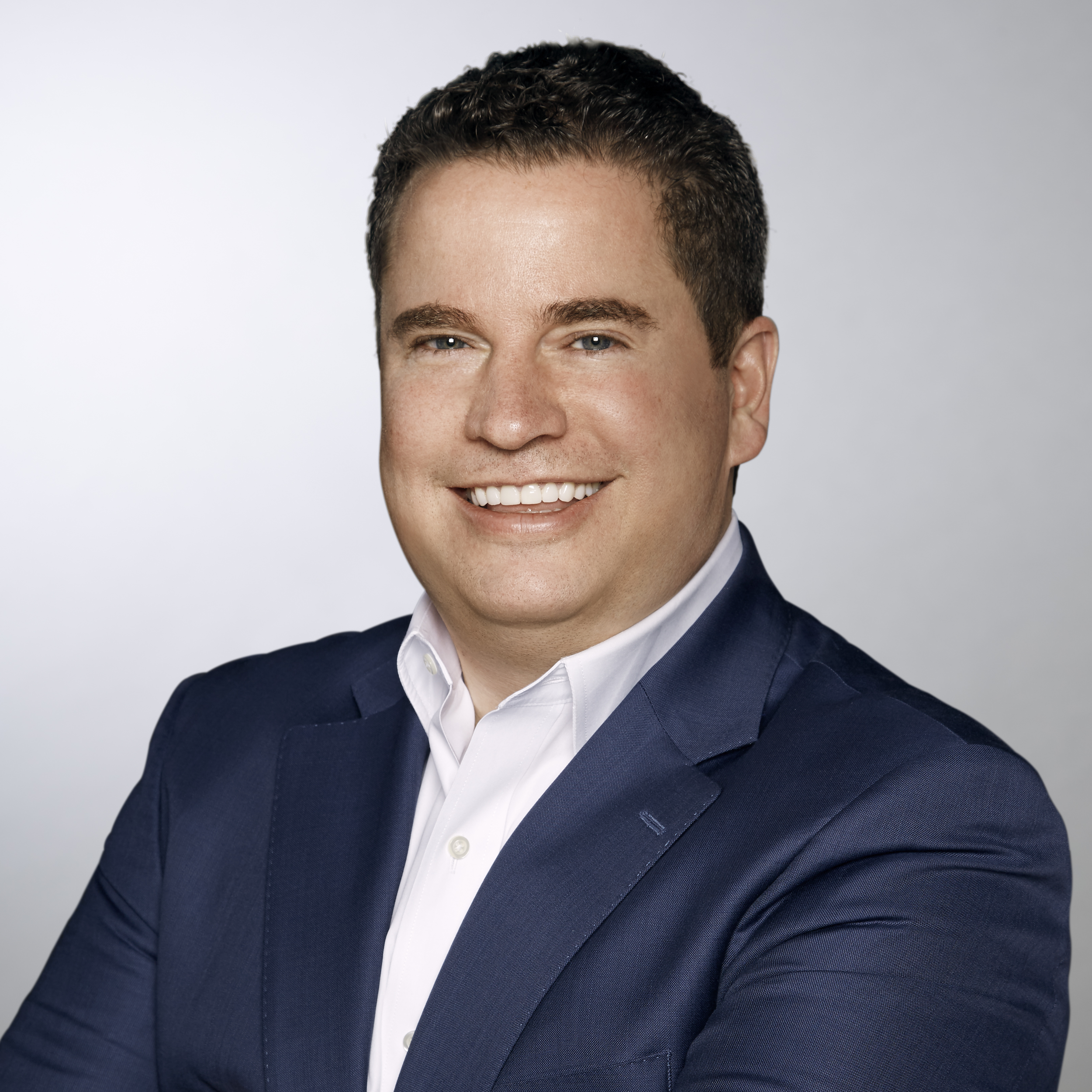
- Higgins in 2018
- Born: c. 1974 (age 51–52); New York City, U.S.
- Education: Queens College; Fordham University
- Occupation: Businessperson
- Known for: Co-founder of RSE Ventures

Matt Higgins (born c. 1974) is an American entrepreneur, author, media executive, and the co-founder and CEO of RSE Ventures, a private investment firm that focuses on sports and entertainment, media and marketing, food and lifestyle, and technology. In 2012, Higgins co-founded RSE with Stephen M. Ross, the founder of Related Companies and owner of the Miami Dolphins. Higgins served as Vice Chairman of the Dolphins from 2012-2021, having previously been a high-level executive with the New York Jets. Higgins is the co-founder of combat robotics company, Performance Drone Works (PDW). His first book, Burn the Boats: Toss Plan B Overboard and Unleash Your Full Potential was published by William Morrow in 2023, and was named a Wall Street Journal Bestseller.

== Early life ==
Higgins was born in Flushing and grew up in the Bayside neighborhood of Queens, New York City. He is of Irish descent. After growing up in abject poverty and taking care of his ailing mother, Higgins decided to drop out of high school at age 16, obtain his equivalency diploma and enroll at Queens College, where he took night classes and graduated with a political science degree. He started his career as an award-winning investigative reporter at the Queens Tribune and attended Fordham University School of Law at night, while working for Mayor Rudolph W. Giuliani as the youngest press secretary in New York City history.

== Career ==
Higgins is the CEO and co-founder of RSE Ventures, a company that has invested in various companies and technologies, including: FanVision, the handheld device that is the official in-venue content provider of NASCAR, Thuzio, the project of former NFL running back Tiki Barber and Mark Gerson of Gerson Lehrman Group, and the Drone Racing League, the world's first professional drone racing circuit. RSE Ventures also incubated and invested in restaurant reservation app Resy, which American Express acquired in 2019. In 2016, Higgins negotiated a deal to have RSE Ventures become a minority stakeholder in Momofuku. In 2017, he also negotiated RSE Ventures' funding of Milk Bar (launched in 2008 as part of Momofuku) and D.C.-based fast-casual pizza chain &pizza's national expansion. In 2018, RSE acquired cybersecurity company SkOUT Secure Intelligence and acquired a significant minority stake in Australian-style coffee and café business Bluestone Lane. In 2020, Higgins led the investment to take full ownership over New York City staple Magnolia Bakery. RSE's portfolio highlights include: Visium, Breakaway, VaynerMedia, Brooklyn Dumpling Shop, Indify, MSCHF, Fuku, Magic Spoon, and public relations firm Derris which was later acquired by BerlinRosen in 2022.

Higgins co-founded Relevent Sports, a global sports and media rights organization best known for representing commercial rights to European football leagues, including UEFA's men's club competitions globally, English Football League (EFL) in the Americas, La Liga across North America, and Bundesliga in North, Central, and South America. Relevent Sports created the International Champions Cup, the largest privately owned soccer tournament featuring Europe's top clubs, including the most attended match in U.S. history at Michigan Stadium with an attendance of over 109,000 fans. RSE Ventures also partnered with Gary Vaynerchuk in 2014 to form VaynerRSE, a $25 million seed fund and incubator.

Higgins was the vice chairman of the Miami Dolphins from 2012-2021, serving as an advisor to owner Stephen M. Ross. Higgins helped hire Mike Tannenbaum, the Dolphins' executive vice president of football operations. Prior to the Dolphins, Higgins worked for the New York Jets from 2004 to 2012, serving as the executive vice president of business operations and close advisor to Jets owner Woody Johnson. Higgins was instrumental in helping the team build MetLife Stadium with the New York Giants, building a new training facility in Florham Park, and using Twitter, Facebook and a revamped website for fans to have better access to the team.

Before his career with the Jets, Higgins was COO of the Lower Manhattan Development Corporation, the firm tasked with rebuilding the site of the World Trade Center. He also served as press secretary under Mayor Rudolph W. Giuliani, managing the global media response to the September 11 attacks in 2001 for New York City.

Beginning in 2018, Higgins has appeared as a guest investor on the series Shark Tank. He was part of a five-Shark investment in the Cup Board Pro, the product of late FDNY firefighter Keith Young, whose children pitched the product after he died from 9/11-related cancer. The Sharks pledged to invest any profits into a charity that will benefit firefighters suffering from 9/11-related illnesses.

In January 2023, Higgins co-founded VaynerWatt, a content production company, along with famed social media star investor Gary Vaynerchuk and television veteran Eric Wattenberg. VaynerWatt produces original long- and short-form content for streaming platforms and linear networks. VaynerWatt's production credits include The Z-Suite on Tubi, starring Lauren Graham, and The Home Team, an inside look at the New York Jets, on Amazon Prime.

In 2024, Higgins became the first Shark to appear on both the U.S. and Dubai versions of Shark Tank.

== Recognition ==
In 2007, Higgins was recognized by Crain's New York as one of the top 40 executives under 40 in New York. Four years later, Sports Business Journal selected him in their "40 under 40" list as one of the most outstanding executives in sports. In 2015, Forbes listed RSE Ventures as one of the 10 best organizations to work for in sports. In February 2017, RSE Ventures portfolio companies Resy and Drone Racing League were named to Fast Company's World's Most Innovative Companies 2017 list, and in 2018, portfolio company &pizza was named to the list. In 2019 Higgins joined the ranks of former U.S. presidents, Nobel Prize winners and CEOs when he was awarded the Ellis Island Medal of Honor. The award recognizes individuals who have made it their mission to share their wealth of knowledge, courage, compassion, unique talents and selfless generosity with those less fortunate.

== Personal life ==
Higgins is a board member of Autism Speaks and an avid runner. He is also a testicular cancer survivor, which he successfully treated in 2007. In 2011, he ran the ING marathon to help raise money for autism. Higgins received a bachelor's degree from Queens College and a juris doctor from the Fordham University School of Law in 2002.

In 2019, he delivered the commencement address at his alma mater Queens College, where he established the Linda Higgins Empowerment Scholarship to help support single parents in obtaining college degrees, in honor of his late mother. According to Vanity Fair Contributing Editor Paul Goldberger, "This is a magnificent and truly inspiring speech that everyone should read. If you think commencement speeches are made of cliches, this one will change your mind. To me it belongs in the same category as David Foster Wallace’s great speech at Kenyon College commencement in 2005."

In 2024, Higgins delivered the commencement address at Molloy University, titled "Why Not Me?", at Nassau Veterans Memorial Coliseum.
