= Relevent =

American sports media company

- Company type: Private
- Industry: Sports marketing Media rights
- Founded: 2012; 13 years ago
- Founder: Stephen M. Ross, Daniel Sillman, Matt Higgins
- Headquarters: New York City
- Area served: Global
- Key people: Daniel Sillman (CEO); Stephen M. Ross (Chairman); Boris Gartner (President)
- Website: Relevent.com

Relevent, formerly known as Relevent Sports Group (RSG), is a global sports and media rights organization. It is best known for representing commercial rights to European football leagues, including UEFA's men's club competitions such as UEFA Champions League, Europa League, and Conference League men's competitions globally, English Football League (EFL) in the Americas, La Liga across North America, and Bundesliga in North, Central, and South America.

Having secured more than $4 billion in media rights and sponsorship agreements on behalf of its partners, Relevent is considered one of the most influential companies promoting football globally. It operates the Premier League Summer Series throughout the United States. The company was founded in 2012 by RSE Ventures, and is owned by Stephen M. Ross, owner of the Miami Dolphins.

== History ==
Relevent was founded in 2012 by RSE Ventures as a sports media company and promoter of sporting events. Due to Relevent's work, European soccer clubs, including Germany's FC Bayern Munich, France's Lyon, UK's Chelsea and Borussia Dortmund, have become regular guests in the USA.

In 2018, Relevent began its transition from a live events company to a media rights commercial agency and internationalization platform for clubs, federations, and leagues looking to expand internationally.

=== Media Rights ===
In August 2018, Relevent signed a 15-year joint venture deal with La Liga, called La Liga North America, which promotes soccer in Canada and the US. In 2021, it was announced that partnership would extend for an additional five years in Central America. Relevent went on to negotiate La Liga's media rights deal with ESPN in 2021, which marked the largest football media rights deal ever in the U.S. and Canada, as well as the sale of La Liga's rights in Mexico and Central America to Televisa Sky Sports that same year.

In 2022, Relevent secured UEFA's men's club competitions media rights for the United States for the 2024-2027 cycle and sold the UEFA rights to Paramount Network/CBS Sports for a six year-term for $1.5 billion. In 2023, Relevent brokered the sale of UEFA broadcasting rights in the U.S. to TelevisaUnivision for a three-year deal worth $225 million.

In early 2024, Relevent landed exclusive English Football League (EFL) fixture distribution rights throughout North, Central, and South America. The company went on to negotiate the sale of the EFL's rights in the United States to CBS Sports. Later that year, the organization struck a 17-year deal to represent the Bundesliga in the sale of its media rights in North, Central, and South America.

In March 2025, Relevent announced that it had officially won a landmark mandate to represent the UEFA men's club competitions global media and sponsorship rights for the 2027-2033 cycle. The deal is UEFA's first commercial rights sales partnership since the formation of the UC3, a joint venture between UEFA and the ECA, and is the first change in global agency representation since the creation of the Champions League over 30 years ago.

=== International Champions Cup ===
In 2013, the company launched the International Champions Cup, a pre-season tournament in which European soccer teams play in the United States, Europe, and Asia.

In 2017, the Men's ICC included the first pre-season El Clásico, a soccer match between Barcelona and Real Madrid, to the US for the first time and outside of Spain for the second time in 100 years. The following year, Relevent launched the Women's ICC, as well as an international youth tournament, the ICC Futures.

=== League Matches ===
In April 2019, Relevent sued the United States Soccer Federation (USSF) and FIFA in the Supreme Court of New York, accusing the organizations of having a conflict of interest in sanctioning professional games and conspiring to block Relevent from bringing regular-season games to North America from overseas leagues. The lawsuit stated that the Federation was threatening Relevent's soccer promotion business after it denied two of the company's proposals to have foreign league and cup matches at Hard Rock Stadium in Miami. In September 2020, the United States Department of Justice entered the dispute, warning FIFA that banning popular soccer games in the US could be a breach of US anti-trust laws. In 2024, it was announced that FIFA and Relevent had settled its lawsuit, allowing for international league matches to be played in the US. The first international league match was set to be between Villarreal and Barcelona on December 20, 2025 at Hard Rock Stadium in Miami, but was cancelled on October 22 due to fan and player backlash.
