= Daniel Sillman =

American executive (born 1989)

Daniel Sillman (born 1989) is an American sports executive, entrepreneur, and film producer. He is the CEO of Ross Sports & Entertainment, which includes the Miami Dolphins, Hard Rock Stadium, Miami Grand Prix, Miami Open tennis tournament and Precision Drive Club. Sillman is also the Co-Founder and Executive Chairman at Relevent, a live soccer events and media company best known for marketing the media rights for the UEFA’s men's club competitions — including the UEFA Champions League — globally, English Football League (EFL) in the Americas, La Liga across North America, and Bundesliga in North, Central, and South America. Relevent also operates the Premier League Summer Series throughout the United States.

Sillman is credited with helping catalyze the increased interest in European football within the United States. He led efforts to bring El Clásico, a soccer match between Barcelona and Real Madrid, to the US for the first time and outside of Spain for the second time in 100 years. He was named CEO of Relevent shortly after the Miami-based El Clásico in 2017, which was widely considered a commercial success.

== Career ==
Before joining Relevent, Sillman founded Compass Management Group while he was a student at the University of Michigan. The company offered financial services to athletes and entertainers, including Brandon Graham, who later played for the Philadelphia Eagles and Draymond Green of the Golden State Warriors.

He sold Compass in 2014 and joined RSE Ventures, a private investment firm owned by Stephen M. Ross, where he served as Director of Business Development. He then transitioned to Relevent, and, shortly thereafter, led the company's transition from a live events company to a global commercial rights partner for professional football properties.

In 2018, Sillman negotiated a 15-year joint venture deal on behalf of Relevent with La Liga to promote the Spanish league in North America. In 2021, he negotiated La Liga's record-breaking $1.4 billion US media rights deal with ESPN. Sillman also led the media rights negotiation and sale of La Liga's rights in Mexico and Central America to Televisa Sky Sports in 2021 for approximately $600 million.

In February 2022, UEFA awarded Relevent to act as UEFA and the European Club Association’s sales agent for US media rights of UEFA club competition. In August 2022, Sillman negotiated with Paramount and reached a 6-year deal with UEFA valued at $1.5 billion, more than 2.5 times the value of the prior deal for the English language rights to UEFA Club Competitions. Relevent and Sillman also negotiated a 3-year deal with TelevisaUnivision for over $225 million for Spanish language rights for the seasons 2024-2027. Sillman later led Relevent in securing and selling UEFA’s club competition rights in the US and EFL match fixture rights across North, Central, and South America.

In 2024, Sillman helped Relevent earn the business for EFL match fixture rights across North, Central, and South America and negotiated Relevent’s 17-year agreement to represent the Bundesliga in the sale of its media rights in North, Central, and South America. Sillman also led Relevent’s efforts to pursue and win a bid to represent the UEFA men’s club competition commercial rights globally for the 2027-2033 cycle. Relevent was officially awarded the mandate in March 2025; the deal is UEFA’s first commercial rights sales partnership since the formation of the UC3, a joint venture between UEFA and the ECA, and is the first change in global agency representation since the creation of the Champions League over 30 years ago.

== Ross Sports & Entertainment (RSE) ==
In August 2026, Sillman was named Chief Executive Officer of the newly formed Ross Sports & Entertainment, which includes the Miami Dolphins, Hard Rock Stadium, Miami Grand Prix, Miami Open tennis tournament and Precision Drive Club.

== Additional Ventures ==
Sillman was included on Forbes' "30 Under 30 Sports" list in 2018 Sports Business Journal's 2019 “Forty Under 40” list, and Leaders "Under 40" 2022 list.

Sillman is a member of the FIFA World Cup 26™ Miami Host Committee Board of Directors. He serves on the board of directors of RISE, a national nonprofit that educates and empowers the sports community to eliminate racial discrimination, champion social justice, and improve race relations. Sillman is a long time business partner with NBA Champion Draymond Green.

Sillman is executive producer of the ESPN documentary about Ada Hegerberg, My Name is Ada Hegerberg, as well as the Netflix docuseries about Brazilian soccer star Neymar, The Perfect Chaos.

Sillman was publicly named alongside Maverick Carter as an investor in Rocket Youth, a youth-enrichment platform, in early 2025.
