= Guidepoint =

Expert network

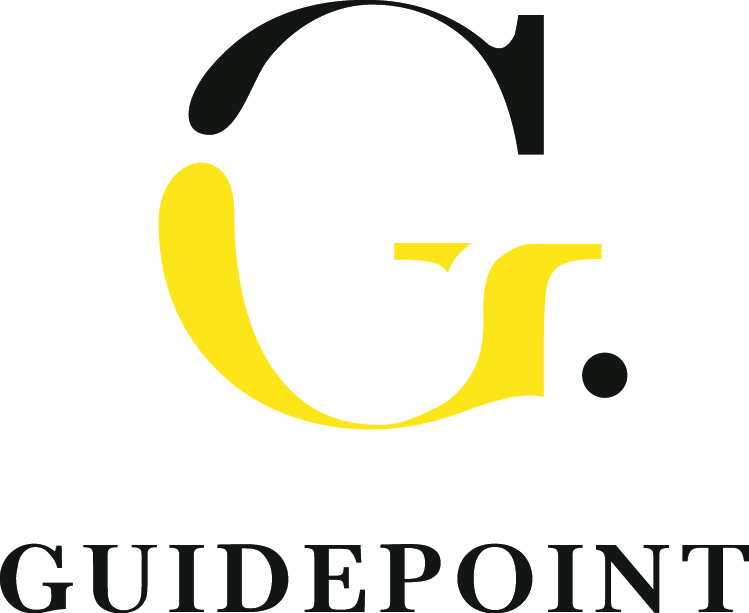
- Industry: Expert network
- Founded: 2003
- Founder: Albert Sebag
- Headquarters: New York City, New York, U.S.

Guidepoint is an expert network, providing business & government professionals with opportunities to communicate with industry and subject-matter experts to answer research questions.

== History ==
Guidepoint was founded by Albert Sebag as Clinical Advisors. Launched in 2003, Clinical Advisors matched cancer patients with the clinical trial that best suited their case.

As Clinical Advisors expanded their network to include expertise in additional healthcare areas, the company progressed into other industries and sectors. In 2007, the company changed its name to Guidepoint Global to reflect this expanded business model. In 2009, Guidepoint Global acquired Vista Research, an expert network company that was active in Asia and had a strong network of experts in other industries such as technology and telecom. from Standard & Poor’s.

Shortly after rebranding as Guidepoint, “the experts at finding expertise,” and premiering a new logo and website, Guidepoint acquired Innosquared, a Germany-based expert network firm.”

== Business model ==
Clients use Guidepoint as a resource to find answers to specific industry questions that might only be answered by industry and subject-matter experts. The company essentially operates as a matchmaking service, connecting its users to recruited experts in the field they are looking to learn more about. Experts are categorized into six main industry sectors: Healthcare; Financial and Business Services; Consumer Goods and Services; Energy and Industrials; Tech, Media, and Telecom; and Legal and Regulatory.

Services are subscription-based and include hourly phone consultations, in-person events, teleconferences, surveys, custom research reports, and a monthly healthcare data offering called Guidepoint TRACKER, which features data on market share in the therapeutics and medical device sectors, such as the US Breast Implant market.

According to Integrity Research, Guidepoint is ranked as the second-largest expert network, with a network of more than 1,000,000 experts.

== Regulatory issue with insider trading ==
In 2010, there were allegations that an expert who provided expert network services gave confidential information to a third party who traded on that information in violation of the federal securities law. That resulted in a strong regulatory focus on the industry and its investment firm clients. Charges were not brought against Guidepoint. According to Integrity Research, “Although Guidepoint was mentioned in insider trading complaints, its compliance procedures protected it from accusations of wrong doing.”
