= Expert network =

Type of business

Expert networks refer to a type of business that connects companies with expert resources or subject-matter experts, such as academics, C-levels, founders, and high-level officials to provide valuable information, data, or assistance.

== Background ==
The phrase "expert network" was originally coined by Mark O'Connor of Yankee Group in presentations introducing his August 1997 Management Strategies report, "Knowledge Management: People and the Process".

The first known published appearance of the phrase in this context is in the April 1999 Yankee Group white paper "A Knowledge Perspective: The Enterprise Knowledge Management Product and Service Domain." In the December 1999 publication, "Knowledge Evolution: Tools of the Trade", clients were advised to utilize Expert Networks to "Understand who the experts are throughout the organization (including the extended organization), and more appropriately employ that expertise within a broader range of business contexts for better decision making."

The first expert networks used internal databases and phone books, just like standard recruitment firms. With the growth of LinkedIn and other online sources, expert networks have become increasingly reliant on custom-sourcing experts online.

Since the early 2000s, a rather large industry has sprung up facilitating "expert" connections, or providing connections to industry or subject matter experts with whom a single individual or organization has no pre-existing relationship with. GLG, one of the oldest and largest expert networks and was founded in 1998.

== Business models ==
There are three aspects of business models for expert networks: (1) revenue models, (2) sourcing models, and (3) operating models. Expert networks may apply two different revenue models: subscription-based and transaction-based.

=== Revenue models ===
==== Transaction-based ====
The most common revenue model is "pay-per-use" where an expert networks invoices the client per hour of expert consultation, times the "credit" price of the expert. The expert network then pays a part of this to the expert.

==== Subscription-based ====
The traditional revenue model was to offer subscriptions to clients. This model still represents a large share of the industry, notably for GLG and Maven Research. The client pays for a predefined number of "credits" at the start of the contract year, which are run down as expert consultations are made. The network keeps the difference between the subscription fees collected and the hourly rates paid out.

=== Sourcing models ===
When sourcing experts to connect with clients, an expert network may use either an Internal database, or custom recruiting (or a combination). Whereas expert networks traditionally relied on internal databases of experts, business models have tilted towards 'custom recruiting' of new experts for each particular case. This was enabled by the rapid growth of LinkedIn in the years following the 2008 financial crisis.

=== Operating models ===
Expert networks structure internal operations differently, along models that transcend their revenue and sourcing models. These have been classified in five categories, each solving the task of supplying relevant experts to customers:

- Standard expert networks
- DIY marketplaces
- Expert Q&A companies
- Crowd-funded expert calls

== Commercial expert networks ==
A primary example of expert networks are commercial networks that are in the business of primary research. These firms connect investors, consultants, and business decision-makers with industry experts. Consultations between expert network clients and experts may be in the form of "face-to-face meetings, phone calls, teleconferences, video conferences, [or] email exchanges." Prominent commercial expert networks include GLG, Guidepoint, AlphaSights, and Dialectica (company).

According to a 2009 report by Integrity Research, there are at least 38 investor expert network providers worldwide. Although most expert networks operate across verticals and geographies, recent trends point towards specialized expert networks serving a particular geography or vertical.

In recent years, as sell-side research has become increasingly "scarce and less influential," institutional investors have turned to expert networks to gain "new insights and a competitive edge" within a compliant framework. According to a 2011 report published by TABB Group, 81% of investment professionals believe that "talking to experts" is a legitimate, value-adding part of the investment due diligence process.

Investor expert networks became more widely used after the implementation of Regulation Fair Disclosure in 2000, which made it harder for institutional investors to get market moving information directly from publicly traded companies. Hedge funds were early adopters, but the use of expert networks quickly spread to all types of institutional investors, including mutual funds, pension funds, banks, and private equity firms. The investment community continues to be the largest consumer of expert network services. In 2020, expert network companies generated an estimated $1.5 billion in revenues, according to a report by Integrity Research.

=== Investor expert network legal compliance issues ===
One of the biggest challenges faced by expert network operators is legal compliance with regard to the information passed from information provider to researcher. Several expert networks have made headlines in relation to improper information disclosure and insider trading allegations. Networks have taken different approaches to the compliance puzzle. Some spend millions reaching out to publicly traded companies and others don't allow employees of publicly traded companies to consult at all.

=== Investor expert network controversy ===
The Fall 2009 indictment of individuals associated with hedge fund FrontPoint illustrated the compliance challenges of speaking with sources directly. The individuals had initiated access with a Dr. Yves Benhamou, board member of an ongoing clinical trial. Though these began as formal engagements through Guidepoint (an Expert Network), their exchanges with Dr. Benhamou would become less formal and more specific. They stopped going through the network, opting to contact one another directly, and they allegedly culminated in the portfolio managers coaxing inside information from Dr. Benhamou and Dr. Benhamou obliging. The circumstances illustrate one of the core challenges of primary research in general and a central plank of the expert network platform. The investigations resulted in allegations against Primary Global Research LLC. While the United States expert networks were weathering the storm of the insider trading investigations, European expert networks have not been nearly as affected and have been seen as alternatives, experiencing growth and investment.

== See also ==
- Sharing economy
