= Stephen M. Ross =

American businessman and sports team owner (born 1940)

Stephen Ross
- Ross in 2023
- Born: Stephen Michael Ross; May 10, 1940 (age 86); Detroit, Michigan, U.S.
- Education: University of Michigan (BBA); Wayne State University (JD); New York University (LLM)
- Occupations: Non Executive Chairman of Related Companies, 95% owner of Miami Dolphins
- Known for: Developing the Deutsche Bank Center and the Hudson Yards
- Children: 2
- Relatives: Max Fisher (uncle)
- Football career

Miami Dolphins
- Title: Owner

Career history
- Miami Dolphins (2009–present) Owner

Stephen Michael Ross (born May 10, 1940) is an American billionaire real estate developer, philanthropist, and sports team owner. Ross is the chairman of Related Companies, a global real estate development firm he founded in 1972. Related is best known for developing Deutsche Bank Center, as well as the Hudson Yards Redevelopment Project. Ross had a net worth of $10.1 billion in 2020, ranking him 185th on Forbes Billionaires List. In 2026, his net worth was $17 billion and ranked #59th on the Forbes list. Ross is also the principal owner of the Miami Dolphins and Hard Rock Stadium.

Ross is a major benefactor of his alma mater, the University of Michigan; with lifetime contributions of $478 million, he is the largest donor in its history. According to the Chronicle of Philanthropy, his higher education gifts rank behind only those of fellow American billionaire Michael Bloomberg. The university renamed its business school to the Ross School of Business in Ross's honor, in 2004, after he made a $100 million gift to fund a new building. The Stephen M. Ross Academic Center was completed in January 2006. In September 2013, Ross donated $200 million to the university ($100 million to the business school and $100 million to Michigan athletics), the largest single gift in its history; the university announced plans to rename its athletics campus in his honor. In 2020, Ross announced an additional $100 million donation to kickstart fundraising for the construction of the University of Michigan Detroit Center for Innovation.

== Early life and education ==
Born and raised in Detroit, Stephen Michael Ross grew up in a Jewish family. He first attended Mumford High School in Detroit and later graduated from Miami Beach Senior High School. He attended the University of Florida for two years before transferring to the University of Michigan, where he earned a Bachelor of Business Administration degree in 1962. He later received a Juris Doctor from Wayne State University in 1965 and a Master of Laws in Taxation from the New York University School of Law in 1966. These later degrees were financed by a loan from his uncle, the businessman Max Fisher, whom Ross has called "the most important role model and inspiration for me in life."

== Career ==
Ross began his career as a tax attorney at Coopers & Lybrand in Detroit. In 1968, he moved to New York City and accepted a position as an assistant vice president in the real estate subsidiary of Laird Inc., then worked in the corporate finance department of Bear Stearns. In 1972, he was fired from that company after clashing with a superior; living off $10,000 ($67,000 in 2021 dollars) lent to him by his mother, he utilized his federal tax law knowledge to organize deals for wealthy investors, allowing them to shelter income with the generous incentives granted by the federal government to promote the construction of federally subsidized affordable housing. Ross was very successful, earning $150,000 in his first year.

=== Related Companies ===
In 1972, Ross founded Related Companies, a real estate development company. Related originally began as the Related Housing Companies, which built thousands of subsidized low and moderate income apartments nationwide. By the 1980s, Ross turned towards higher-profile projects. He hired architect Robert A.M. Stern in the 1990s to design The Chatham on the corner of 65th Street and Third Avenue.

Headquartered in New York City, Related now has offices and real estate developments in Boston, Chicago, Los Angeles, Dallas, Washington, D.C., South Florida, Abu Dhabi, and London. The company directly employs approximately 4,000 people. The company's existing portfolio of real estate assets, valued at over $60 billion, is made up of mixed-use, residential, retail, office, trade show and affordable properties in what the company calls "premier high-barrier-to-entry markets."

Related is the largest owner of luxury residential rental properties with over 40,000 units in its portfolio and has developed mixed-use projects such as Deutsche Bank Center in New York, CityPlace in West Palm Beach, The Grand in Los Angeles (designed by Frank Gehry) and the 28-acre Hudson Yards project on Manhattan's west side. Hudson Yards is the largest and most expensive real-estate project in America — at almost a billion dollars an acre. Ross constructed an atrium inside Hudson Yards specifically to entice Coach into moving into the development. Related is also a major investor in Equinox Fitness Clubs, SoulCycle, and fast casual restaurant chains.

The company announced in July 2024 that Ross would be stepping down as chairman of Related Companies to focus on his business ventures via Related Ross, the Miami Dolphins, and F1. Ross has continued as non-executive chairman of Related Companies.

Ross is looking to invest $10 billion to turn West Palm Beach into a financial hub, with plans for six million square feet of office space, 1.4 million square feet of condos, and nearly 900 hotel rooms across the 70 acres of land he’s amassed over the last two decades. In December 2025, Related Ross received a $772 million loan, one of the largest construction loans in Florida history, for two office towers in West Palm Beach. In January 2026, Ross committed $50m to help develop a Vanderbilt University campus in West Palm Beach. On April 2, 2026, Related Ross broke ground for a 28-story condominium along the water in West Palm Beach.

=== Miami Dolphins ===
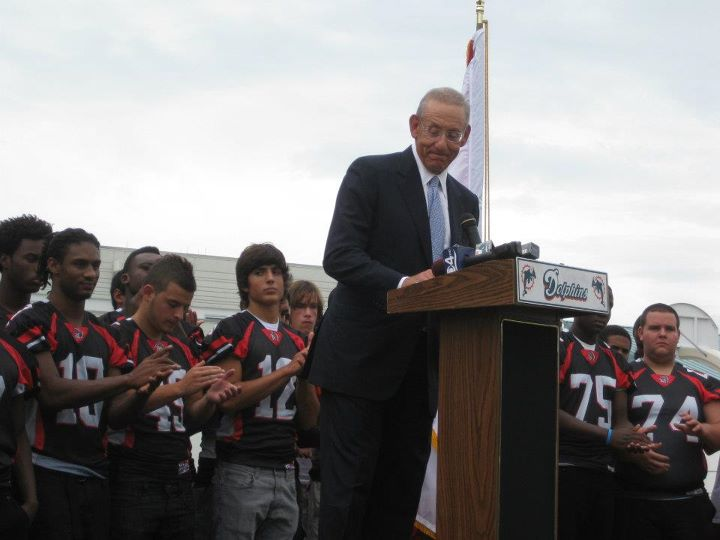
Ross in 2011

In February 2008, Ross bought 50% of the Miami Dolphins franchise, Dolphin Stadium (now known as Hard Rock Stadium), and surrounding land from then-owner Wayne Huizenga for $550 million, with an agreement to later become the Dolphins' managing general partner. On January 20, 2009, Ross closed on the purchase of an additional 45% of the team from Huizenga. The total value of the deal was $1.1 billion. This means Ross is now the owner of 95% of both the franchise and the stadium. Ross announced his intention to keep Bill Parcells as the director of football operations.

Since buying the Dolphins, Ross has brought in Gloria Estefan, Marc Anthony, Venus Williams, and Serena Williams as minority owners of the team. In 2013, Roger Goodell made a pitch to the Florida legislature on Ross’ behalf in order to obtain multimillion-dollar public funding from the state to help renovate Hard Rock Stadium, the Dolphins' home field. The Dolphins wanted $3 million a year for the next 30 years, with Ross committed to funding 70% of the cost. However, Florida lawmakers rejected the proposal, despite granting over $100 million in subsidies to The Ballpark of the Palm Beaches. Ross ended up spending $500 million out-of-pocket to refresh the stadium.

On March 27, 2017, Ross cast the only "no" vote in the NFL owners' 31–1 "yes" decision on the Oakland Raiders request for approval to move to Las Vegas starting in the 2020 season.

Since 2019, the Miami Open has been hosted at the Hard Rock Stadium.

On February 1, 2022, Ross and the Dolphins, among other teams, were cited in a federal class-action lawsuit brought forth by his former head coach Brian Flores, alleging that Ross offered Flores a $100,000 bonus for every game he lost in the Dolphins’ 2019 campaign. As of February 2, 2022, the NFL publicly denied all allegations against Ross and all others listed in the lawsuit, releasing in an official statement: "We will defend against these claims, which are without merit."

On August 2, 2022, following a six-month independent investigation by Mary Jo White and a team of lawyers, it was announced that the NFL would strip the Dolphins of their 2023 first-round draft pick and a 2024 third-round draft pick for violating the league's anti-tampering policy on three occasions from 2019 to 2022 by engaging in impermissible conversations with quarterback Tom Brady and then-New Orleans Saints coach Sean Payton, both of whom were under contract with other teams. Ross, the team owner, was also fined $1.5 million and suspended through October 17, 2022, and was prohibited from being at the Dolphins' facility or representing the team at any event until then. He was also prohibited from attending any league meeting before the annual meeting in 2023, and was removed from all league committees indefinitely. Vice chairman and limited partner Bruce Beal was fined $500,000 and was not permitted to attend any league meetings for the rest of the 2022 season. The investigation did not find that the Dolphins intentionally lost games during the 2019 season.

In December 2024, Ross struck a deal to sell a 10% stake in the Dolphins to private equity giant Ares Management, at an $8.1 billion valuation. Ross also sold a 3% stake in the team to Alibaba co-founder Joe Tsai. The stake sales were among the first under new NFL rules that allowed PE firms to buy minority stakes in teams, a practice seen in the NBA and other pro sports leagues.

In March 2026, Ross sold 1% of his stake in the holding company behind the Dolphins for $125 million, valuing the company at $12.5 billion, a record valuation for a minority transaction in sports. Ross sold the 1% stake to Lin Bin, the co-founder of Xiaomi.

=== F1 ===
Ross owns the Miami International Autodrome, a purpose-built temporary circuit around Hard Rock Stadium. The Autodrome has exclusive rights to host the Miami Grand Prix through the 2041 season, the longest race contract in the sport. The Formula One Grand Prix was held there for the first time during the 2022 season. Ross had been trying to bring about the Miami Grand Prix for several years before being successful. The circuit layout is designed in a way that local residents would not be disrupted by the races. It is also one of the newest racetracks in the United States. In 2024, there were minor tweaks made to the circuit, including resurfacing the track.

=== RSE Ventures ===
RSE Ventures is a private investment firm that focuses on sports and entertainment, media and marketing, food and lifestyle, and technology. RSE Ventures was co-founded in 2012 by Ross and Matt Higgins, former executive vice president of the New York Jets. RSE builds, owns and operates a variety of companies, including the Drone Racing League, Thuzio, VaynerMedia, and Relevent.

== Civic and philanthropic activities ==
=== University of Michigan ===
In 2004, Ross made the single largest contribution (at the time) to the University of Michigan by donating $100 million to the school. The university renamed its business school Ross School of Business in his honor. Ross invested in a partnership named RERI that was donated to the University of Michigan. RERI obtained its own appraisal for the donation in the amount of $32.935 million. The university sold the Ross-donated remaining interest in December 2005. Ross was co-chair of the University of Michigan's fundraising campaign, which was completed in May 2007. On September 12, 2013, it was announced Ross had committed an additional $200 million gift to the university, to be distributed equally among the Ross School of Business and the university's athletic department. It replaced Charlie Munger's 2013 contribution of $115 million as the largest single gift in the university's history. On September 20, 2017, Ross donated an additional $50 million to the University of Michigan, the majority of which would support career development programs for students, innovative action-based learning experiences, and resources for attracting and developing junior faculty.

=== RISE ===
In 2015, Ross founded RISE, a coalition which fights racism and promotes social justice within the sports industry. RISE has partnered with NASCAR, National Lacrosse League, PGA of America, Professional Women's Hockey Players Association, United States Tennis Association, and USA Track & Field.

=== WRI ===
In 2020, he committed $63.5 million to support the WRI Ross Center for Sustainable Cities, bringing his total contribution to the program to $100 million. The program features a network of over 350 experts working in cities around the globe to create accessible, equitable, and resilient urban areas. Ross also helped establish the WRI Ross Center and the New Urban Mobility alliance (NUMO), with contributions of $36.5 million. The same year, Ross made an additional $13 million donation to RISE, bringing his total commitment to $30 million.

=== Real Estate Board of New York ===
Ross is chairperson emeritus of the Real Estate Board of New York (REBNY), the city's leading real estate trade association. As a member of the board of trustees of the Solomon R. Guggenheim Foundation, Ross was involved in the planning of a major renovation of the Frank Lloyd Wright iconic building and other new museums. He is a trustee of New York Presbyterian Hospital, the Urban Land Institute, the NY Chapter of Juvenile Diabetes Research Foundation International, the Levin Institute and is a director of the Jackie Robinson Foundation and the World Resources Institute.

=== Cornell Tech ===
Ross is on the board for the Cornell Tech campus, a $2 billion redevelopment of Roosevelt Island including the Joan & Irwin Jacobs Technion-Cornell Institute, a partnership between Cornell University and the Technion – Israel Institute of Technology that when completed will house several thousand postgraduate students, hundreds of faculty, and a high-tech business incubator.

=== Palm Beach County ===
In 2023, Ross donated $8 million to fund education initiatives in Palm Beach County. The Stephen M. Ross Emerging Scholars Program at Palm Beach State college was created with the donated funds. The program will fund college prep in high schools in addition to postsecondary scholarships for graduates of Palm Beach Lakes and Forest Hill Schools.

== Politics ==
Ross has contributed major donations to individuals and organizations of both the Democratic and Republican parties. He has previously donated funds to Chuck Schumer, Jerry Nadler, Andrew Cuomo, George Pataki, the Democratic Senatorial Campaign Committee, the Democratic Congressional Campaign Committee, the New Jersey Democratic State Committee, the New York Republican State Committee, and the Republican National Committee.

Ross was a major supporter and contributor to the Mitt Romney 2012 presidential campaign.

In August 2019, it was reported that Ross would host a major fundraiser for the Donald Trump 2020 presidential campaign at his Hamptons home on August 9.

In response to calls for boycotts of companies affiliated with Ross, a spokesperson for Equinox and SoulCycle told CNN, "Neither Equinox nor SoulCycle have anything to do with the event later this week and do not support it. As is consistent with our policies, no company profits are used to fund politicians."

In 2021, his super PAC, Common Sense NYC, spent $550,000 to oppose eight progressive Democrats in New York City's 2021 City Council election. They succeeded in helping defeat six of the eight Democrats.

== Honors and awards ==
Ross has received numerous honors for his business, civic, and philanthropic activities.

In 2009, he was named No. 3 in The New York Observer's Most Powerful Person in New York Real Estate list.

In 2017, the University of Michigan presented him with an ESPY Award for his philanthropic contributions to the school.

In 2018, the Jackie Robinson Foundation awarded Ross with a ROBIE Lifetime Achievement Award. He was inducted into the NFL Leadership Hall of Fame in 2019.

In 2020, Ross and the Miami Dolphins were awarded the Paul Tagliabue Award for diversity. The following year, Sports Business Journal recognized Ross as a leader in diversity and inclusive hiring.

In 2026, Ross was recognized as one of Time Magazine's 100 Most Influential People in Sports.

== Personal life ==
Ross has two children from his first marriage. In April 2021, it was made public that he was divorcing his second wife, Kara (née Gaffney) Ross, after 18 years of marriage. He has two stepchildren with Gaffney.

Ross owns an 11,000 square foot oceanfront mansion in Palm Beach named "The Reef".

Sporting positions
Preceded by Wayne Huizenga	Miami Dolphins owner 2009–present	Incumbent
