= Neymar: The Perfect Chaos =

- Genre: Docu-series
- Directed by: David Charles Rodrigues
- Countries of origin: United States; Brazil
- Original languages: Portuguese; French; Spanish; English
- No. of seasons: 1
- No. of episodes: 3

Production
- Editor: Will Znidaric
- Production companies: Campfire; Makemake

Original release
- Network: Netflix
- Release: 25 January 2022

Neymar: The Perfect Chaos is a 2022 Netflix docuseries about Brazilian professional football player Neymar. Directed by David Charles Rodrigues, it is in Portuguese with subtitles available in other languages and consists of three episodes chronicling Neymar's rise to stardom, both within and outside of football, as well as a deeper look at the relationship between Neymar and his father, also named Neymar. Executive producers include LeBron James and Maverick Carter. While Neymar is the main focus, the series also sees guest stars including: Lionel Messi, Kylian Mbappé, David Beckham, Marquinhos, and Luis Suárez.

== Plot ==
The first episode, “The Great Brazilian Promise,” focuses on the first two decades of his life. In the beginning five minutes, viewers are given a quick summary of Neymar’s achievements and infamy through a reel of clips of important events in his life, before backtracking to his origin story. A present-day Neymar visits his hometown of Praia Grande in Brazil and talks about difficulties growing up without money as well as his time in Santos FC, at the end of which he wins the Copa Libertadores, allowing him to have his pick of European clubs to join. The episode concludes with his arrival at Camp Nou, the home stadium of FC Barcelona.

“The Comeback,” the second episode, mainly focuses on Neymar’s time at FC Barcelona, particularly the round of 16 knockout match in the UEFA Champions League between FC Barcelona and Paris Saint-Germain where Neymar was crucial in the team’s comeback victory, as well as the events in his personal life during it, including a scandal where Brazilian model Najila Trindade accuses Neymar of raping her. At the end of the episode, Neymar signs a 5-year contract to play for Paris Saint Germain.

In the final episode, “This is Paris,” Neymar struggles to settle in at PSG and ponders the future of his career and personal life. The death of American basketball player Kobe Bryant is shown to be a turning point for Neymar, as he decides to focus on football more seriously and to leave a lasting legacy both on and off the field.

== Reception ==
John Anderson of the Wall Street Journal, criticized the series for painting Neymar in a too-flattering light, stating "David Charles Rodrigues treats him, often enough, like the star of his own music video. One does get the sense, too, that the other people interviewed about him aren't as frank as they might be."

== Cast ==
- Neymar
- David Beckham
- Lionel Messi
- Kylian Mbappé
- Marquinhos
- Thiago Silva
- Dani Alves
- Luis Suárez

== Episodes ==
No.	Title	Directed by	Original release date
1	"The Great Brazilian Promise"	Unknown	January 25, 2022
2	"The Comeback"	Unknown	January 25, 2022
3	"This is Paris"	Unknown	January 25, 2022

== Production ==
Daniel Sillman is an executive producer on the Netflix docuseries about Brazilian soccer star Neymar, Neymar: The Perfect Chaos.
