= Kara Ross =

American jewelry designer (born 1966)

- Born: Kara Gaffney; 1965 or 1966 (age 60–61)
- Occupation: Jewelry designer
- Spouse(s): Jonathan McCann (divorced); Stephen M. Ross (separated)
- Children: 4

Kara Ross (née Gaffney; born 1966/1967) is an American jewelry designer.

== Early life ==
Kara Gaffney grew up in the Main Line town of Malvern, Pennsylvania, one of the five children of a surgeon, Edmund Gaffney and his wife, Barbara. She designed her first piece of jewelry when she was thirteen from a tourmaline gemstone she acquired during a family safari in Africa. She attended the exclusive Agnes Irwin School in Rosemont, Pennsylvania with fashion designer Tory Burch (they remain friends today) and her first job was at Ann Taylor in the King of Prussia Mall. She graduated from Georgetown University with a major in English and a minor in art history and interned at several local public relations agencies as well as CNN. She then moved to New York City where she accepted a position in advertising sales with Harper’s Bazaar in Manhattan.

== Career ==
After three years selling magazine advertisements, she enrolled in a six-month intensive program at the Gemological Institute of America and became a certified gemologist. She then started designing her own jewelry focusing on fine jewelry, making one-of-a-kind pieces for private clients. In 2003, she founded Kara Ross New York and her jewelry line made its debut at Bergdorf Goodman. She is known for melding traditional gold, platinum and diamond elements with organic materials like ebony and maple. In 2005, she launched a luxury handbag collection featuring exotic skins and gemstone clasps.

Her clientele includes Anne Hathaway, Kate Hudson, Alicia Keys, Demi Moore, Oprah Winfrey, Michelle Obama. The White House engaged Ross to create an exclusive line of jewelry, crafted from a magnolia tree that is on the White House lawn, for the first lady to gift to visiting heads of state and departing female staffers. Her jewelry is sold at Bergdorf Goodman, Harrods, Saks Fifth Avenue, Bloomingdales, Henri Bendel, Scoop, and Intermix. She also has a distributor in Canada and showrooms in both New York City and London.

In 2008, Ross won the Fashion Group International Rising Star Accessories Award. In 2012, she was pronounced the Design Award Winner by the Women’s Jewelry Association.

== Personal life ==
In 2003, she married billionaire real estate developer Stephen M. Ross. She lives in New York with her two daughters from a previous marriage to Jonathan McCann. Stephen Ross also has two children from his first marriage. In April 2021, it was made public that the couple was divorcing after 18 years of marriage.

Ross currently serves on the 2012-2013 Board of Directors of Georgetown University.
