= Tessa Watts =

English music video producer

- Born: Stephanie Siddons; 25 October 1945; Bedfordshire, England
- Died: 13 May 2014 (aged 68)
- Occupations: Producer and Record Company Executive
- Years active: 1972–2014
- Awards: Palme d'Or

Tessa Watts (born Stephanie Siddons; 25 October 1945 – 13 May 2014) was an English music video and music film producer. She worked with artists including Michael Jackson, Lionel Richie, Paul McCartney, Madonna, Phil Collins, Beyoncé, INXS, and George Michael. She is best known for her work at Virgin Records, and with MTV International.

Watts's career started at Virgin Records, where she was one of the original members of the Virgin team. She has been credited as suggesting the company name Virgin – as all the company's members were "virgins" to business.

As press officer at the record company for bands including the Sex Pistols, her work plunged Virgin into the mainstream of the punk rock era. Soon taking over all production at Virgin Records, she commissioned over 1,500 music videos, including Peter Gabriel's "Sledgehammer" video. "Sledgehammer" (1986) is the most awarded music video of all time, and won Best Video Awards in the UK, Europe (including at Cannes) and the USA. In 1999, it ranked at number four on MTV's 100 Greatest Music Videos Ever Made, and has also been declared to be MTV's number one animated video of all time. MTV later announced that it is the most played music video in the history of the station. The video was partly animated by Academy Award winner Nick Park (of Wallace and Gromit fame); the video was Park's first job at Aardman Animations.

In 1986, Watts set up the programming department for the European launch of MTV. Three years later, she received a Grammy Nomination for producing Mike + The Mechanics' acclaimed music video for "The Living Years".

In 1989, Watts was named managing director of Propaganda Films (Adaptation, Being John Malkovich) in London, working with directors including David Fincher and Michael Bay. In 2002, she began working with Sanctuary Records Group as the director of production. She was recruited by Metropolis Group in 2006 as an executive producer for the company's broadcast production division.

== Personal life ==
Watts divorced rock journalist Michael Watts, formerly of music magazine Melody Maker in 2008, with whom she had a son and a daughter, media executive Sophie Watts. She was a member of the influential Whitney family. Following her divorce she moved to near Pau, France. She died of pancreatic cancer on 13 May 2014.
