= Thuzio =

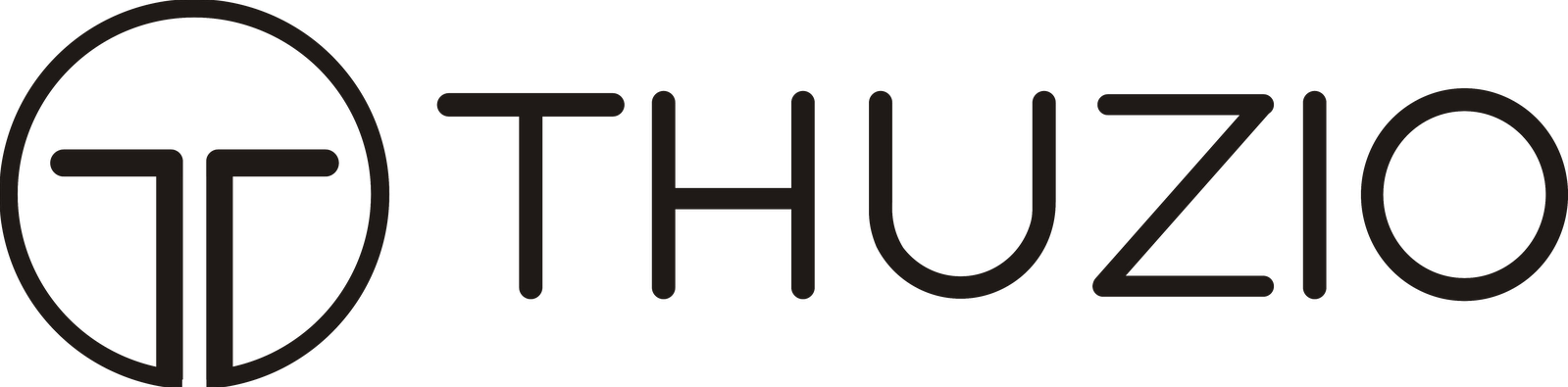
- Company type: Privately held company
- Industry: Sports
- Founded: 2012
- Founders: Tiki Barber, Mark Gerson, Jared Augustine and Jarrod Jordan
- Fate: Acquired
- Successor: Triller
- Headquarters: New York City, United States
- Area served: United States
- Products: Sports media and events
- Owner: Triller
- Website: thuzio.com

Thuzio was an American sports media and events company that produced a weekly, live-sports interview show for a members-only audience as well as specific events with sports people. It was acquired by TrillerNet in 2021.

== History ==
Thuzio was founded in 2012 by Tiki Barber from the New York Giants, Mark Gerson from Gerson Lehrman Group), and Jared Augustine from GrubHub/Seamless.

Thuzio's Board of Advisors includes Matthew Higgins, CEO of RSE Ventures; Michael Weisman, Emmy Award-winning producer and executive in charge of production for “Football Night in America”; Thomas J. Laffont, Senior Analyst at Coatue Management and Partner at Coatue Management; Jordan Bazant, principal at The Legacy Agency; Casey Coffman, advisor at Carpere Group; Billy Nash, senior vice president at UBS; Jason Freier, chairman and CEO of Hardball Capital.

Thuzio received $1.5 million in venture capital in July 2012. RSE Ventures invested $2.56 million in January 2013. In 2014, the company raised another $6 million in Series A funding.

On November 22, 2021, Thuzio was acquired by TrillerNet.
