= Related Ross =

Real-estate company in Florida, US

- Formerly: Related Southeast
- Industry: Real estate development, Property management
- Founded: 2024
- Founder: Stephen M. Ross
- Headquarters: West Palm Beach, Florida
- Website: www.relatedross.com

Related Ross is an American real-estate firm, founded in 2024 by Stephen M. Ross. It is West Palm Beach, Florida’s largest developer and Class A landlord, owning nearly 3 million square feet of commercial space as well as a mixed-use complex and residential properties, including CityPlace.

As of 2025, Related Ross is investing approximately $10 billion to develop 8 million square feet of space across West Palm Beach.

== History ==
Stephen Ross began amassing property in South Florida during the COVID-19 pandemic, noticing a migration of people and companies moving to Florida for its weather and tax policies. In July 2024, Related Ross was launched, with Ross acting as chairman and CEO.

In February 2025, Related Ross opened its first project, One Flagler, a 270,000 square-foot building standing 25-stories tall and featuring a 1.25-acre park showcasing works by Fred Eversley.

In June 2025, Related Ross released revised plans for a “mini-downtown” development in Wellington, Florida.

Related Ross requested a $1.3 million grant from the city of West Palm Beach in July 2025 to renovate two buildings on the historic Hibiscus House property and develop a restaurant. It was later announced that the firm secured a $772 million construction financing package for two new office towers at CityPlace, which is the largest construction loan ever recorded in Florida.

On April 2, 2026, Related Ross broke ground for a 28-story condominium along the water in West Palm Beach. In February 2026, Related Ross announced it's plan to purchase 71 acres of land in Wellington for a master-planned community and private school.
