= Ryan Kavanaugh =

American film financier (born 1974)

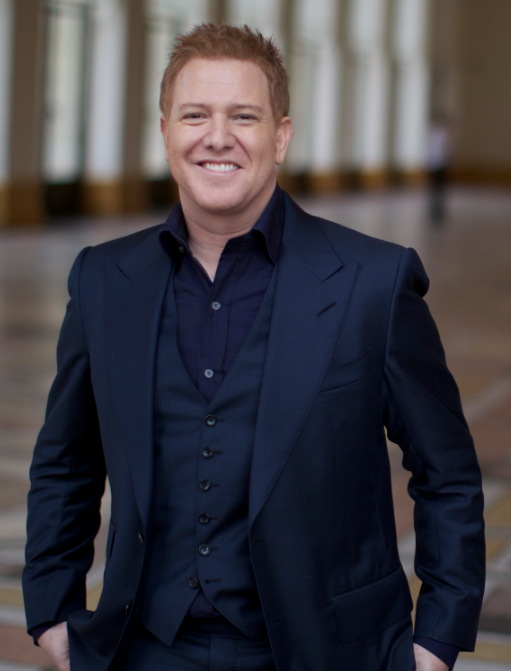
- Kavanaugh in 2014
- Born: 1974 (age 51–52); Los Angeles, California, U.S.
- Occupation: Film financier
- Known for: Co-founder and former CEO of Relativity Media
- Spouses: Britta Lazenga (m. 2011, divorced) Jessica Roffey (m. 2015, divorced)
- Children: 2

Ryan Kavanaugh (born 1974) is an American film financier. He co-founded Relativity Media and served as its CEO, brokering deals between Wall Street investors and major film studios. He credited his risk-assessment algorithm for Relativity Media's initial success. He stepped down as CEO after Relativity Media's second bankruptcy filing and subsequently founded Proxima Media, which held a controlling stake in Triller from 2019 to 2022.

== Early life ==
Kavanaugh was born into a Jewish family in Los Angeles, California, and raised in the Brentwood neighborhood, where he attended Brentwood High School. His mother is a real estate broker, and his father, a dentist turned businessman, was born in Germany. His father changed his surname to Kavanaugh before his son's birth. Kavanaugh began purchasing company shares at the age of six.

Kavanaugh attended UC Santa Barbara and UCLA but dropped out in 1996. In 2012, Kavanaugh threatened The New Yorker with legal action for its reporting on him, including its report that he dropped out of university. Kavanaugh said he was "an official graduate of UCLA and currently enrolled in a PhD program at USC". The New Yorker stood by its reporting. While subsequent sources reported that Kavanaugh finished a degree in 2012, The Wall Street Journal reported that there was no record of him taking classes at USC.

== Career ==
=== Early career ===
After leaving UCLA in the late 1990s, Kavanaugh started a short-lived venture capital firm. Several investors, including Jon Peters, sued Kavanaugh, alleging fraud, and the suits were settled out of court. In a separate suit, Michael Sitrick, an executive and Kavanaugh family friend, alleged that Kavanaugh violated terms of their agreement and placed most of Sitrick's $6 million investment into a type of Ponzi scheme at a company where Kavanaugh was a board member. An arbitrator found that Kavanaugh was "clearly negligent", and Sitrick won a $7.7 million arbitration judgment against Kavanaugh that was never paid because Kavanaugh successfully argued that he was virtually penniless and his business on the verge of bankruptcy at the time of the judgment.

=== Relativity Media ===
==== Founding, initial success, and bankruptcy (2003–2015) ====
Kavanaugh co-founded Relativity Media with entertainment executive Lynwood Spinks in 2003, claiming to have created a Monte Carlo-based risk-assessment model to reliably predict a film's potential earnings. Banks and hedge funds, looking for investments outside of the stock market, invested heavily in Kavanaugh's selected films. He utilized slate financing, which bundled together groups of films to spread the investment risk. Kavanaugh also worked out a formula in which every time a movie was produced through Relativity’s financing, the studio would pay his company and investors in the slate $1 million. Kavanaugh himself would receive executive producer credit to capitalize on the association with the films.

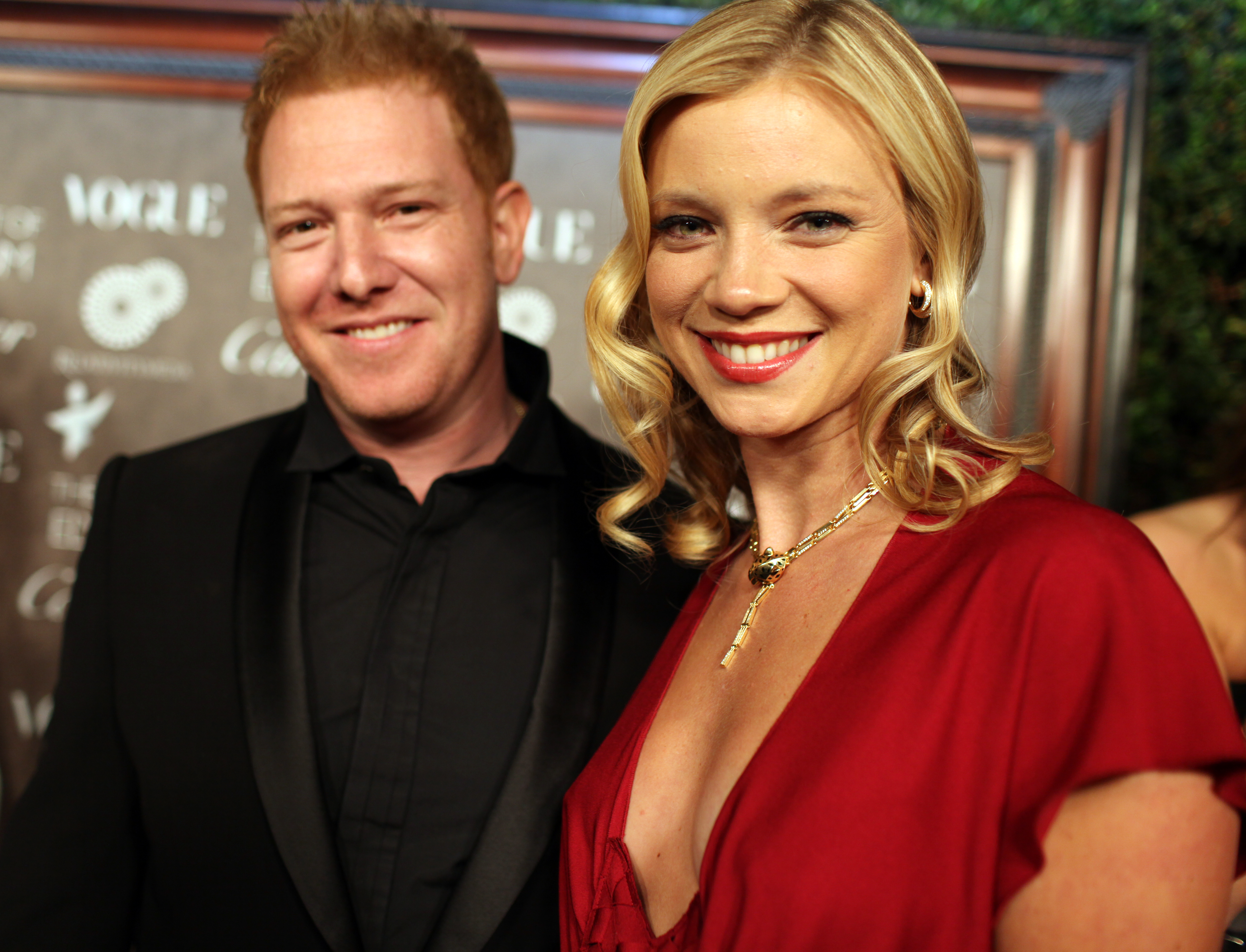
Kavanaugh next to actress Amy Smart at an event in 2009

Hailing Albert Einstein as his role model, Kavanaugh was known for writing equations on white boards at investor meetings with hedge-fund bankers and producers. Kavanaugh advertised heavily in the trade press, where he was known for bringing Wall Street money to the studios. However, many investors lost money or received poor returns in several of his deals. By 2009, three quarters of films produced by Sony and Universal Pictures had used Kavanaugh's financing.

In 2010, Kavanaugh raised investor funds for Relativity Media to launch its own studio, producing movies vetted by Kavanaugh's algorithm. Although Relativity Media executives privately disagreed with Kavanaugh's estimations, he publicized increasingly grandiose claims about Relativity Media's valuation, combining third-party investment deals and optimistic projections into reported revenue. Kavanaugh had claimed his model had an 85% accuracy rate, though by 2010, the algorithm had proved unprofitable, with box-office bombs outnumbering commercial successes.

In 2011, Kavanaugh was named "Showman of the Year" by Variety and placed 22nd on the Fortune 40 Under 40 list.

In May 2011, Elliott Associates attempted to rein in Kavanaugh's management. Kavanaugh publicly claimed that he would buy out the hedge fund's stake to re-take charge of his company, but Elliott Associates denied that they would sell to him. Their primary investment in Relativity Media funded a Universal Pictures deal, but Kavanaugh's studio chose to date several of its own films in competition with Universal's. Elliott Associates moved to take direct control of their film deal, eliminating Kavanaugh's executive producer fees, and significantly dropping their stake in Relativity Media. In November 2011, investor Ron Burkle arranged a series of loans to Kavanaugh's company in exchange for interest, ultimately buying out Elliott's stake in 2012. Industry speculation surfaced that Burkle would oust Kavanaugh from Relativity Media in favor of his friend Harvey Weinstein, but Burkle and Weinstein both disclaimed the scenario.

Relativity Media executives became increasingly doubtful as the company's financial health declined yet Kavanaugh's valuations kept increasing. Kavanaugh presented implausible valuations and "adjusted" EBITDA numbers to investors, which included projections based on films the company had already relinquished to Elliott Management. In June 2015, lenders began requiring Kavanaugh to receive approval before making any transactions. In July, Relativity Media filed for bankruptcy. As a result, Netflix sought to end a distribution deal with Relativity Media, and Kavanaugh responded by sending threatening emails to Ted Sarandos, co-CEO of Netflix.

==== Post-bankruptcy (2015–2018) ====
Shortly after the bankruptcy filing, RKA Film Financing, then one of its lenders, sued the company for misappropriating marketing funds, called Kavanaugh a "con man", and alleged that he was operating a "scheme to defraud investors". They also alleged that Kavanaugh used their invested funds for personal expenses. Relativity Media denied that the money was diverted, saying that RKA Film Financing understood that the money would go into a general corporate account. Relativity Media countersued for $200 million. Kavanaugh and other defendants filed a motion to dismiss, arguing RKA Film Financing failed to state a claim, and the suit was dismissed with prejudice.

Relativity Media's operations and reorganization remained under the supervision of a bankruptcy court until March 2016. Kavanaugh eventually stepped down as CEO at the end of 2016 but held onto a majority equity of Relativity Media. Leading up to his resignation, Kavanaugh was absent from the company's offices for weeks and did not take part in executive decisions.

In May 2018, Relativity Media filed for bankruptcy again and arranged to sell all of its assets. The United States Trustee's office argued that the bankruptcy seemed to benefit Kavanaugh and the new buyer UltraV Holdings at the expense of Relativity Media's creditors. The trustee learned that Kavanaugh paid himself $2.6 million between April and November 2016 while his company failed to pay bankruptcy fees or file tax returns. They also questioned the legitimacy of Relativity Media's sale to UltraV Holdings since Kavanaugh continued to have extensive access at the company after the bankruptcy filing stated that he had already left; UltraV Holdings had quickly rehired Kavanaugh as a consultant for Relativity Media, paying him $10,000 per month.

In June 2018, an arbitration case found that Relativity Media executives fabricated a memo accusing Relativity Media's former co-president Adam Fields of sexual harassment. A forensic audit of Relativity Media found the memo had been generated by a user named "kav kav". Relativity Media submitted the falsified memo to court two weeks before Fields's wrongful termination suit against Kavanaugh was set to be tried. Fields's lawsuit alleged that Kavanaugh misrepresented Relativity Media's financial prospects, wrongfully fired Fields four months into his four-year contract, and used Relativity Media office space to produce pornography without the co-president's knowledge or authorization. A Los Angeles arbitration judge awarded Fields $8.4 million in damages and found that Kavanaugh "must be" one of the people who forged the sexual harassment memo.

=== Proxima Media ===
In 2017, Kavanaugh created the film production company, Proxima Media, and was in negotiations with a potential Hong Kong-based partner for funding. Due to the escalating trade war between the US and China, the deal did not go through. After failing to acquire the online stock trading game Hollywood Stock Exchange (HSX) in February 2019, Kavanaugh set out to create a film properties trading exchange for fans to invest in movies. In May 2019, Kavanaugh announced a cryptocurrency to be used for fractional investing in the platform's slates. Kavanaugh was confident that the Jobs Act would allow his platform to operate legally, but securities experts said that the project's inherent risks might increase scrutiny from the SEC. He tapped Elon Spar, who formerly worked for Cantor Fitzgerald, the owner of HSX, to help him develop the company. The two subsequently formed Entertainment Stock X (ESX) with Spar as CEO.

In June 2019, Spar initiated a lawsuit against Kavanaugh for fraud. He argued that Kavanaugh persuaded him to go into business under false pretenses. According to the suit, Kavanaugh had claimed to have hundreds of millions of dollars in capital, but Spar discovered that the company had virtually none. Spar further accused Kavanaugh of running a Ponzi scheme at ESX by redirecting investors' funds to pay old debts, manipulating corporate records to conceal his fraud, as well as diverting corporate funds for his own personal use rather than paying employees and contractors. Kavanaugh submitted a counterclaim alleging Spar was breaching his contract with ESX. After settling outside of court, Kavanaugh and Spar withdrew their complaints before the court filing process was completed. Spar then released a public statement saying his earlier characterization of the company was inaccurate.

==== Triller ====
In 2019, Proxima Media acquired a majority stake in the video-sharing platform Triller, coinciding with the Trump administration's announcement that it intended to ban TikTok in the US. Kavanaugh subsequently co-founded Triller Fight Club, a subsidiary focusing on pay-per-view boxing events. In 2021, Kavanaugh proposed a potential merger with SeaChange International to take Triller public. SeaChange International's filing with the SEC stated that a dog food company controlled by Kavanaugh sponsored three Triller fights and represented about 74% of Triller's accounts receivable in 2021. Triller's attorney disputed the revenue data in the filing, but the merger was later dissolved. As of October 2022, Proxima Media no longer owned a controlling share in Triller, and Kavanaugh was no longer a board member.

=== Films produced ===
As of 2012, Kavanaugh has been involved to some capacity in either production or financing for over 200 films, including The Fighter, Limitless, Hancock, Mamma Mia!, The Social Network, Salt, and Cowboys & Aliens. Kavanaugh was denied a producing credit for the Academy Award nomination of the film The Fighter since the Academy of Motion Picture Arts and Sciences only allows the submission of up to three producers for Academy Award consideration; Kavanaugh unsuccessfully appealed the Academy's decision.

== Personal life ==
In 2011, Kavanaugh married ballet dancer Britta Lazenga. In 2015, he married model Jessica Roffey. He has two children. He is a member of the Wilshire Boulevard Temple. According to Forbes, while having been previously featured on their billionaires list in 2013, Kavanaugh's net worth fell below $1 billion once Relativity Media filed for bankruptcy in 2015. As of 2020, Kavanaugh had been a regular donor to the Republican Party. After 47 years of living in Los Angeles, California, Kavanaugh expressed his intention to move both his residence and business to Florida due to LA's progressive governance, rising crime and homelessness, and California's perceived anti-business policies. In January 2024, Kavanaugh launched a podcast, on which he and his guests discuss personal stories of failure.

=== Public incidents ===
Kavanaugh frequently used a personal helicopter for daily commuting. The resulting disturbance prompted some of his neighbors to submit complaints to state and local officials. When it was revealed that the hotel Kavanaugh used for landing was legally permitted only for emergency landings, a spokesperson for Kavanaugh expressed his intention to stop landing there.

In 2012, Kavanaugh was targeted by an extensive extortion plot that was mainly aimed at business executives, including Harvey Weinstein. The perpetrator sent a letter to Kavanaugh demanding $11.3 million and threatening the lives of his family members. A day after receiving the letter, actor Vivek Shah, who had been photographed with Kavanaugh at an event in 2011, was arrested on extortion charges and eventually convicted to seven years in prison.

In 2014, an email thread obtained through the Sony Pictures hack was published, in which Kavanaugh decries the US government's handling of the Gaza–Israel conflict. Among the recipients was Natalie Portman who described the thread as "very disturbing" and complained to Kavanaugh that she did not consent to have her private email address included in the mailing list and wished to be removed. Kavanaugh responded, "Sorry, You are right jews being slaughtered [...] is much much less important then [sic] your email address being shared with 20 of our peers" and continued to include her in the mailing list.

=== Legal issues ===
In 2006, Kavanaugh was arrested after being accused of driving under the influence of alcohol (DUI) and being involved in a hit-and-run. All but the DUI charge, which was lessened to a wet reckless charge, were dropped. Kavanaugh was placed on three years of probation, ordered to pay a fine and take counseling and alcohol education programs. While on probation for his earlier DUI arrest, Kavanaugh was arrested for speeding and drunk driving with a suspended license in 2008. Kavanaugh pled guilty to violating his probation and the other charges were dropped. Kavanaugh then began using a driver.

In 2013, Kavanaugh was criminally investigated for potentially impeding the manhunt for Christopher Dorner because Kavanaugh had landed his helicopter on a sheriff's helipad during the manhunt. Prior to the investigation, Kavanaugh had declined to support sheriff Lee Baca's bid for reelection, whose department launched the investigation. The investigation was heavily criticized by Kavanaugh and a spokesperson called it a "politically motivated vendetta". The investigation was later closed after it concluded that Kavanaugh had received prior permission to land on the helipad.

=== Philanthropy ===
According to former Relativity Media executives, Kavanaugh often pledged large charitable gifts and then billed them to the company. In 2007, Kavanaugh presented Habitat for Humanity with an oversized check pledging $1 million and announced he would become a fund-raising chair for the charity. However, as of 2015, Kavanaugh had not yet donated the promised funds. In 2010, the Board of Governors at Cedars-Sinai Medical Center awarded Kavanaugh its Hollywood Humanitarian Award. In 2011, he received the Anti-Defamation League's Distinguished Entertainment Industry Award. Kavanaugh was chairman of the board of The Art of Elysium from 2009 until 2015. In 2013, several investors including Kavanaugh acquired a pet food company using its proceeds to donate dog food to local animal shelters.

== Selected filmography ==
=== Executive producer ===
Year	Film	Ref.
2005	Land of the Dead	
2006	All The Kings Men	
2006	Talladega Nights: The Ballad of Ricky Bobby	
2006	Gridiron Gang	
2006	RV	
2007	The Kingdom	
2007	I Now Pronounce You Chuck & Larry	
2007	Catch and Release	
2007	3:10 to Yuma	
2007	Charlie Wilson's War	
2007	Full of It	
2008	Made of Honor	
2008	Death Race	
2008	The Express	
2008	All The Kings Men	
2008	21	
2008	Baby Mama	
2008	The Bank Job	
2008	The Tale of Despereaux	
2008	The Forbidden Kingdom	
2009	Zombieland	
2009	The Ugly Truth	
2009	Love Happens	
2009	The Taking of Pelham 123	
2009	The International	
2009	Duplicity	
2009	The Spy Next Door	
2009	Nine	
2010	Salt	
2010	Robin Hood	
2010	Sanctum	
2010	Little Fockers	
2010	The Bounty Hunter	
2010	The Wolfman	
2010	Charlie St. Cloud	
2010	Macgruber	
2010	My Soul to Take	
2010	Season of the Witch	
2011	Cowboys & Aliens	
2011	Judy Moody and the Not Bummer Summer	
2011	Shark Night 3D	
2011	Haywire	
2012	House at the End of the Street	
2012	Act of Valor	
2013	Paranoia	
2013	Oculus	
2014	November Man	
2014	Brick Mansions	
2016	The Space Between Us	
2016	The First Monday in May	
2016	Desert Dancer	
2018	Hunter Killer	

=== Producer ===
Year	Film	Ref.
2009	A Perfect Getaway	
2009	Brothers	
2010	Dear John	
2010	The Fighter	
2011	Immortals	
2011	Limitless	
2011	Take Me Home Tonight	
2012	21 & Over	
2012	Mirror Mirror	
2013	Movie 43	
2013	Malavita	
2013	Safe Haven	
2013	3 Days to Kill	
2014	Beyond the Lights	
2014	The Best of Me	
2014	Out of the Furnace	
2014	Earth to Echo	
2018	The Strangers: Prey at Night	
2025	Skillhouse	
TBA	Bitcoin	
