= AlphaSights =

British information services company

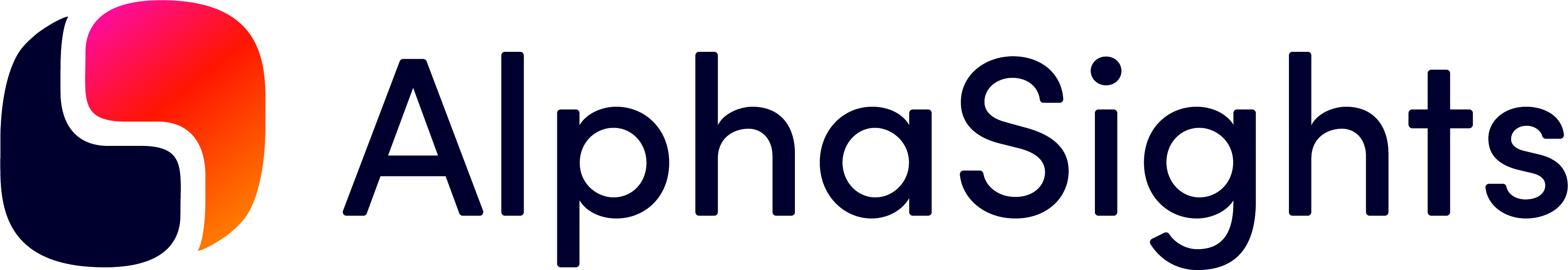
- Type: Private
- Industry: Information services
- Headquarters: London, United Kingdom
- Area served: Worldwide
- Key people: Max Cartellieri and Andrew Heath, Co-Founders and Managing Directors
- Services: Expert network Primary research
- Number of employees: 1000+
- Website: www.alphasights.com

AlphaSights is an information services company, specializing in connecting clients with experts, sometimes referred to as an expert network. The company's clients include professionals operating in management & strategy consulting, investment management, private equity, corporate and professional services firms with interests in a range of markets including technology, industrials, consumer goods, telecommunications, utilities, financial services, healthcare, consumer services, basic materials, and oil and gas.

AlphaSights is headquartered in London and has offices in New York, Hamburg, Dubai, Hong Kong, San Francisco, Seoul, and Tokyo.

== Founders ==
The company was founded in 2008 and incorporated in 2009 in London by Max Cartellieri and Andrew Heath. They met at Stanford Business School in California, but each founded different companies before founding AlphaSights. Cartellieri co-founded Ciao AG, a leading European price comparison website, backed by Munich-based venture capital investor Acton Capital Partners and ultimately acquired by Microsoft. Andrew Heath co-founded GoIndustry, an online marketplace that trades surplus industrial goods all over Europe, now part of GoIndustry DoveBid.

== Growth and expansion ==
AlphaSights opened its second office in New York City and a third office in Hong Kong in 2011 before opening further offices in Dubai in 2012, San Francisco and Seoul in 2015, Hamburg in 2017, and Tokyo in 2018. In 2013, the company was named the third fastest-growing company headquartered in the UK by The Sunday Times Fast Track 100 and has appeared on the list every year since, placing 11th in 2014, 21st in 2015, 41 in 2016 and 81 in 2017. In April 2017, AlphaSights was named as one of the fastest-growing and most disruptive companies headquartered in Europe by the Financial Times.

== Litigation History ==
AlphaSights became the subject of an investigation by a U.S. law firm concerning its classification of certain Client Services Team Associates and similarly titled roles under federal overtime laws. The investigation examined whether these employees were improperly classified as exempt from overtime pay and therefore not compensated for hours worked beyond 40 per week. According to the firm, the inquiry focused on whether the associates’ primary job duties qualified them for exemption despite being paid on a salaried basis. As of 2026, no court ruling or settlement related to the investigation had been publicly announced.

In January 2025, AlphaSights Ltd filed a trademark infringement and unfair competition lawsuit against AlphaSense Inc in the U.S. District Court for the Southern District of New York, alleging that AlphaSense’s branding caused client confusion. In August 2025, the court denied AlphaSense’s motion to dismiss key claims, allowing the case to proceed.
