= Hope Africa University =

Private university in Bujumbura, Burundi

- Established: 2000; 26 years ago
- Founder: Elie A. Buconyori
- Location: Bujumbura, Burundi; 3°20′51″S 29°22′16″E
- Website: hopeafricauniversity.org
- Location within Burundi

Hope Africa University (HAU) was established in 2000 with support from the Free Methodist Church in Karen, Kenya. It relocated to Bujumbura in December 2003. At that time, it had 110 students. It is considered Burundi's best private university and receives the most applicants per year. HAU is the largest and fastest growing private university in Burundi with a peak enrollment of 1,700 students prior to civic disruption in 2015. Since 2015, enrollment has been gradually recovering with a large portion of the student body coming from surrounding Central African countries. HAU was presided by Sylvain Nzohabonayo until 2017 when Victor Barantota, (PhD Special Education), succeeded him as rector. In 2020 HAU was ranked 4th of 7 universities in Burundi by University Guru. Many of Burundi's religious, political and business leaders have attended HAU, including Denise Bucumi Nkurunziza, the wife of the former Burundi President Pierre Nkurunziza.

HAU is a Christian liberal arts university in Bujumbura, Burundi. There are faculties of medicine, nursing, law, agriculture, amongst others. A school of dentistry has been planned and equipped, but as of 2020 is seeking faculty to oversee clinical didactic and practice supervision. Clinique Van Norman is a 100+ bed hospital with outpatient services established in 2012 as part of the HAU complex.

Voice of Hope radio is a local Bujumbura FM station operated since 2008 by the university that provides further avenues for training in radio communication coursework at HAU. Mount Hope is an extension campus of HAU at Gitega, which is the official capital of Burundi, where the nation's parliament is seated. The School of Agriculture program is expected to be headquartered and run from the Mt. Hope campus.
