= Mike Tyson vs. Roy Jones Jr. =

2020 exhibition boxing match

Lockdown Knockdown
- Date: November 28, 2020
- Venue: Staples Center, Los Angeles, California, U.S.
- Title on the line: WBC (Frontline Battle) heavyweight title

Tale of the tape
Boxer	Mike Tyson	Roy Jones Jr.
Nickname	Iron	Junior
Hometown	Catskill, New York, U.S.	Pensacola, Florida, U.S.
Pre-fight record	50–6 (2) (44 KOs)	66–9 (47 KOs)
Age	54 years, 4 months	51 years, 10 months
Height	5 ft 10 in (178 cm)	5 ft 11 in (180 cm)
Weight	220.4 lb (100 kg)	210 lb (95 kg)
Style	Orthodox	Orthodox
Recognition	Former undisputed heavyweight champion	4-division world champion

Result
- Split draw (79–73, 76–76, 76–80)

Mike Tyson vs. Roy Jones Jr., billed as Lockdown Knockdown, was an exhibition boxing match between former undisputed heavyweight world champion Mike Tyson and former four-division world champion Roy Jones Jr. The bout took place at Staples Center in Los Angeles on November 28, 2020, and was sanctioned by the California State Athletic Commission (CSAC). With three former WBC world champions acting as judges, the result was scored as a controversial split draw. The fight sold over 1.6 million PPV buys and generated over $80 million in revenue.

== Background ==
=== Mike Tyson ===
In September 2006, a year after his retirement, Tyson announced that he would embark on a world tour of exhibition fights billed as "Mike Tyson's World Tour" in a bid to overcome the debt he was in at the time. His first bout lasted for four rounds and took place at the Chevrolet Centre in Youngstown, Ohio, on October 20, 2006, against former professional boxer and Tyson's sparring partner Corey Sanders. (Note: Not to be confused with the South African former world heavyweight champion Corrie Sanders.) With 6,000 fans in attendance, the fight failed to live up to expectations and saw the crowd often booing with displeasure. This would be the only exhibition fight of the tour to take place.

Tyson first mentioned the idea of returning to exhibition fights in a YouTube interview with rapper T.I. in April 2020, saying, "I want to go to the gym and get in shape to be able to box three or four-round exhibitions for some charities and stuff." He further teased a potential return to the ring a few weeks later, posting two short videos online of himself training on his Instagram account, and declaring "I'm back" at the end of the second video. Later that month, he said during a Facebook live stream, "Anything's possible. I feel unstoppable now. The gods of war have reawakened me, ignited my ego, and want me to go to war again. I feel like I'm [young] again." Mixed Martial Arts coach Rafael Cordeiro was selected to be Trainer and Cornerman to Tyson for the exhibition bout.

=== Roy Jones Jr. ===
Jones' last bout of his 29-year-long career took place on February 8, 2018, in which he defeated Scott Sigmon via unanimous decision at the Bay Center In Pensacola, Florida. Jones announced his retirement after the bout, but left the door open for a return against former UFC Middleweight Champion Anderson Silva, saying, "Dana, I know you're listening. I know Anderson's suspended. But that's the only other fight Roy Jones will return to the ring for. Other than that, chapter's closed." During preparations for the exhibition, Jones sparred with undefeated cruiserweight boxer Craig "Pressure" Parker, whom Jones identified as the sparring partner who most closely resembled Tyson.

=== Early offers ===
Following his Instagram videos and Facebook live stream, Tyson was contacted by Australian boxing promoter Brian Amatruda with an offer of $1 million to face one of three boxers in an exhibition fight: former Australian rules football player Barry Hall, former rugby league player Paul Gallen, or former rugby league player Sonny Bill Williams. According to celebrity agent Max Markson, who was acting as the middleman between Amatruda and Tyson's team, "Mike read the story in the Daily Mail that he would be fighting a rugby player. He has said he would not do that as it would be an insult to boxing. He says if he does get back into the ring, it will be with a real boxer."

Other offers came from Bare Knuckle Fighting Championship (BKFC) president David Feldman for $20 million to fight an opponent of Tyson's choosing, providing that opponent be under contract with the BKFC, and from Boston Boxing Promotions president Peter Czymor for $1.1 million to face former opponent Peter McNeeley, whom Tyson had previously defeated by disqualification in 1995.

Six days after Tyson posted his training videos, Evander Holyfield posted his own video with the caption: "Are you ready? The moment you've all been waiting for... The Champ is back." In an interview with BoxingScene.com, Holyfield expressed his desire to face Tyson in the ring, saying, "I've already done what I wanted to do in my career, and have been the best that I could be. If it wasn't for charity, I wouldn't fight Tyson, I don't look at it as being a winner in this fight. This is a charity event helping our foundations. The thing is knowing what you're doing it for."

=== Mike Tyson’s Legends Only League ===
Tyson declined all traditional promoter cash offers and instead partnered with emerging venture creation company Eros Innovations, which had recently been founded by media executive and former movie studio STX Entertainment President Sophie Watts, to launch Mike Tyson's Legends Only League. The goal of the sports venture is to provide infrastructure and support to legendary athletes of all sports to compete in global one-off events. Legends Only League exclusively owns all upcoming Tyson fights.

=== Signed deal between Tyson and Jones ===
After two months of negotiations between Tyson's Legends Only League and Holyfield failed to finalize a deal between the two fighters, it was announced on July 23, 2020, that Jones had signed a contract to face Tyson, with the exhibition initially scheduled to take place on September 12 at the Dignity Health Sports Park in Carson, California, alongside other boxers appearing on the undercard. Mike Tyson's Legends Only League announced that the event would include multiple high-profile boxers and musical performers to maximize the audience of the event, and that it would be produced by Sophie Watts and Kiki Tyson, with Mike Tyson, Azim Spicer and Watts’ business partner Johnny Ryan handling the boxing. Undercards included social media star Jake Paul fighting NBA All-Star Slam Dunk Champion Nate Robinson. Musical acts included YG, French Montana, Snoop Dogg, Swae Lee, Wiz Khalifa, and Saint Jhn.

In summer 2020, the League struck a deal with Triller for the emerging social media platform to license the broadcasting rights to the event. Distribution deals were also made with leading pay-per-view platform InDemand and digital pay-per-view platform Fite.tv to air the event in North America. International broadcasting partners included BT Sport in the United Kingdom and Tencent Sports in mainland China.

In August, it was announced that the date of the event had been pushed back to November 28, 2020, in order to maximize the revenue for the event. At a press conference hosted by Triller on October 29, it was announced that the fight would take place at the Staples Center in Los Angeles. The event was officially sanctioned by the California State Athletic Commission (CSAC). Both fighters were required to submit CSAC medical tests for fighters over 40, and the referee was under specific instructions to stop the match if it goes beyond "the boundaries of a professional competitive boxing exhibition". The rules for the fight included eight two-minute rounds as well as 12 oz gloves, as opposed to the more traditional 10 oz gloves worn in heavyweight boxing matches.

=== Scorecard ===
The fight was a split draw and the three former WBC World Champion judges scored the fight as follows: Chad Dawson (76–76 draw), Christy Martin (79–73 for Tyson), and Vinny Pazienza (76–80 for Jones). Compubox numbers showed that Tyson outlanded Jones by a wide margin, and sportswriter Dan Rafael described Pazienza's scorecard as 'pure insanity'.

=== Co-main event and undercard ===
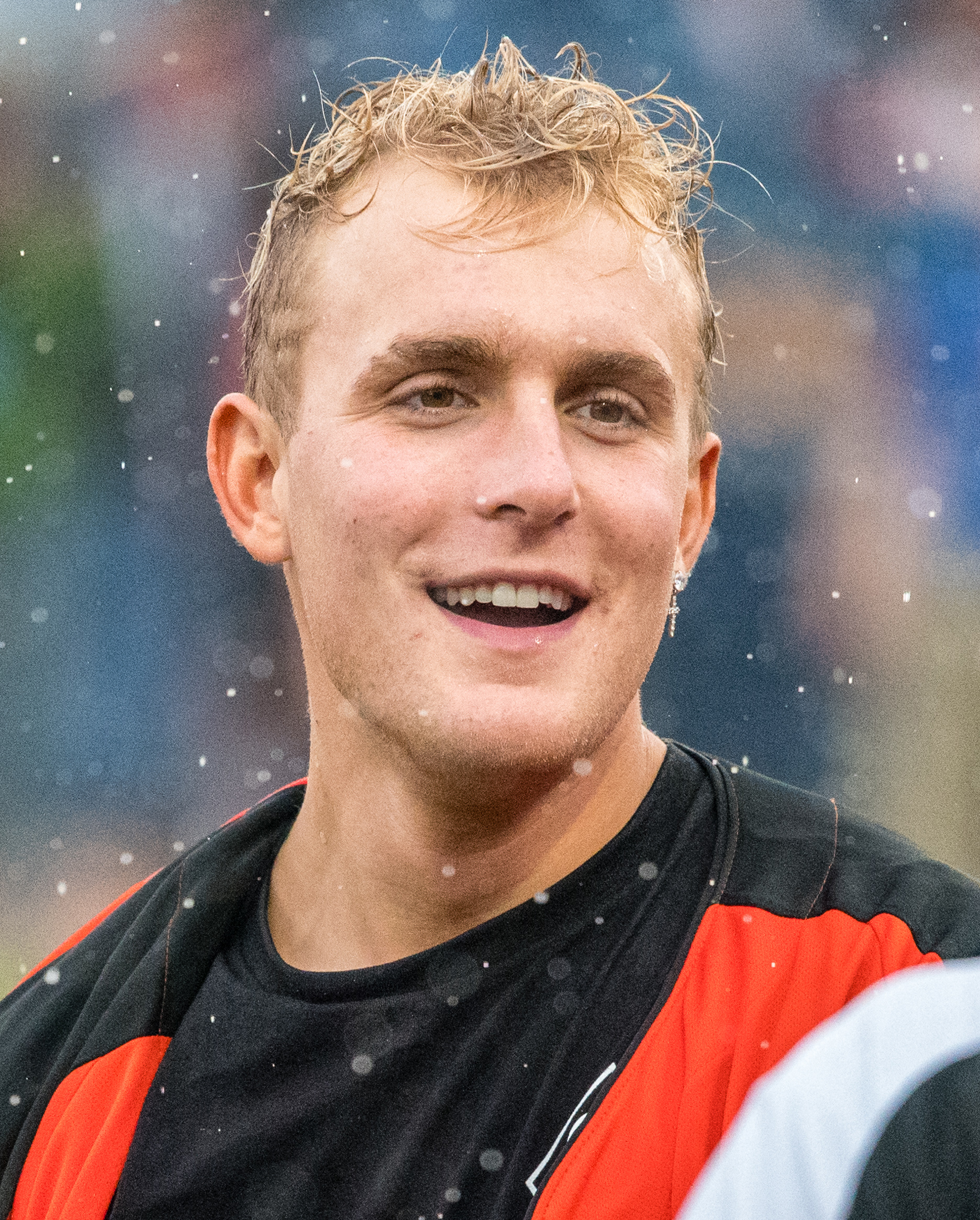
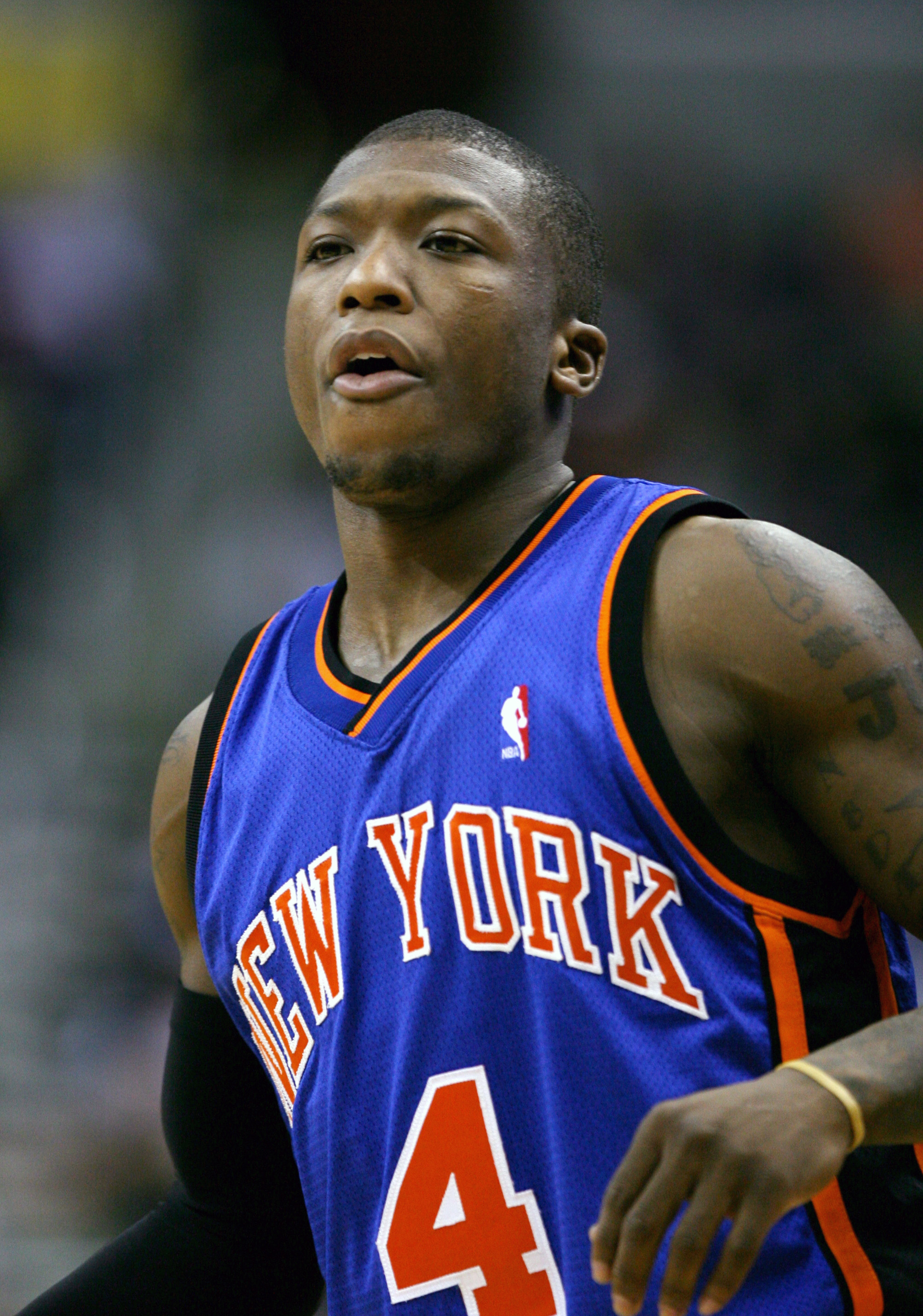
Jake Paul (left) and Nate Robinson (right).

YouTuber Jake Paul faced former NBA player and three-time NBA Slam Dunk Contest champion Nate Robinson in the co-main event. For the first round, Paul forced the action, with Robinson often running to Paul and engaging a clinch. Robinson was dropped late in the first round, and subsequently appeared disoriented in the ring and in his corner. In the second round, he continued to rush forward and was dropped twice by Paul, with the second causing Robinson to fall face first to the canvas, unconscious. Paul was declared the winner by KO at 1:24 of the second round. In his post-fight interviews, he proceeded to call out Mixed Martial Arts fighters Conor McGregor and Dillon Danis.

Opening the Main Card, Badou Jack faced undefeated fighter Blake McKernan. Jack controlled the fight, winning 80–72 on all three judges' scorecards. McKernan received praise for his toughness and ability to withstand Jack's punishment.

== Fight card ==
Weight Class		vs.		Method	Round	Time	Notes
Heavyweight	(United States) Mike Tyson	vs.	(United States) Roy Jones Jr.	SD	8/8		^{Note 1}
Cruiserweight	(United States) Jake Paul	def.	(United States) Nate Robinson	KO	2/6	1:24	^{Note 2}
Light heavyweight	(Sweden) Badou Jack	def.	(United States) Blake McKernan	UD	8/8
Undercard
Lightweight	(United States) Jamaine Ortiz	def.	(Uganda) Sulaiman Segawa	TKO	7		^{Note 3}
Featherweight	(United States) Edward Vazquez	def.	(United States) Irvin Gonzalez Jr.	SD	8/8		^{Note 4}

^Note 1 Exhibition fight; Scored by the WBC
^Note 2 Robinson's professional debut
^Note 3 For WBC-USNBC Silver lightweight title
^Note 4 For WBC-USNBC featherweight title

== Reception ==
The 3-hour Tyson-Jones event took place with no audience and was universally well received by the press, with the New York Times declaring that, “these fights actually look great,” and commenting on the “surprisingly good production value.” CBS Sports wrote that, “the show itself, from start to finish, was surprisingly entertaining throughout.” The fight was noted on social media for the commentary provided by rapper Snoop Dogg.

The fight was also very successful on pay-per-view (PPV), surpassing expectations. The event garnered over 1.6 million buys to become the biggest Boxing pay-per-view event of 2020 and raking in over $80 million in pay-per-view revenue alone.
