= SeaChange International =

Supplier of video delivery software

SeaChange International, Inc.
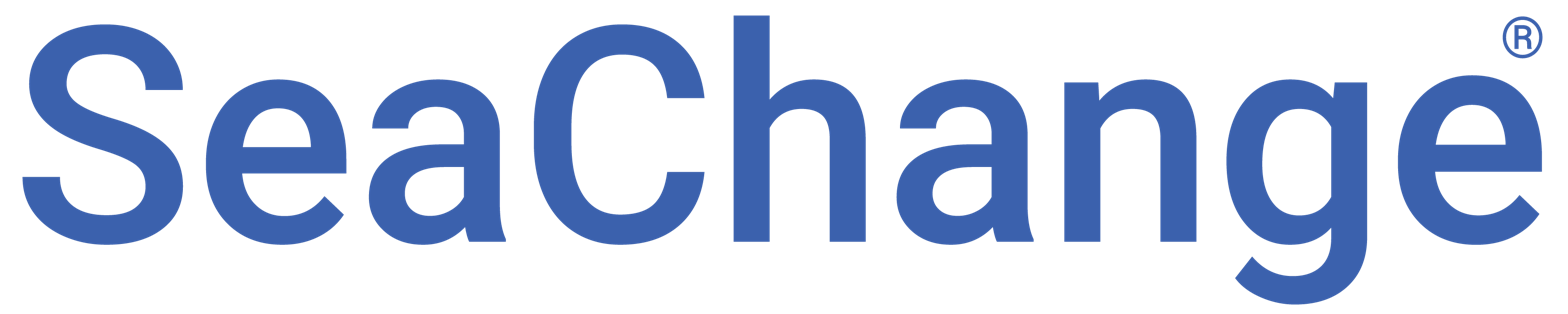
- Type: Public
- Traded as: Nasdaq: SEAC; Russell Microcap Index component
- Industry: Telecommunication; Cable television headend
- Founded: Acton, Massachusetts (1993; 33 years ago)
- Founder: Bill Styslinger
- Headquarters: Acton, United States
- Products: Video on demand TV Everywhere; Enterprise software
- Revenue: US$ 22 million (2021)
- Net income: US$ -22 million (2021)
- Total assets: US$ 50 million (2021)
- Total equity: US$ 32 million (2021)
- Number of employees: 153
- Parent: Enghouse Systems Ltd. (2024–present)
- Website: seachange.com

SeaChange International, Inc. is a global, public supplier of video delivery software, providing video streaming as well as linear TV and video advertising technology for operators, content owners, and broadcasters.

== History ==
SeaChange was founded in January 1993 by Bill Styslinger. In 1996, the company became listed at NASDAQ. In April 2005, SeaChange bought the international assets of Liberate Technologies.

In September 2005, SeaChange acquired UK-based On-Demand Group (ODG). In November 2008, SeaChange acquired Mobix Interactive, also from the UK.

In September 2009, SeaChange bought eventIS, based in the Netherlands. In January 2010, SeaChange acquired Silicon Valley start-up VividLogic. In June 2012, SeaChange obtained the assets of Flashlight Engineering and Consulting.

As part of a strategy to become a "pure-play software provider,” SeaChange did two divestitures: in May 2012, it sold ODG to Avail-TVN and its server hardware business spun out to XOR Media that same month. In 2014 SeaChange acquired Timeline Labs, a start-up that makes tools for broadcasters and video service providers for audience measurement via social media.

SeaChange appointed Ed Terino as their new CEO in 2016, who stepped down on 24 February 2019 amid a conflict with the largest shareholder. On 27 September 2021, Peter D. Aquino was appointed as CEO.

In 2024, almost three years after reporting wanting to merge with TrillerNet, it was announced that it could be acquired by the Montreal-headquartered enterprise software company, PartnerOne for $30 million. However, on May 9, 2024, Enghouse Systems Ltd. announced that it had completed the purchase of all of the company's assets for approximately $23 million.

== Awards ==
SeaChange has won awards, including three Emmy Awards in the category of Technology & Engineering:

- 2001: Emmy Awards for "Pioneering developments in shared video-data-storage systems technology" with the MediaCluster video server
- 2003: Emmy Award for "Time-Shifted Television" software suite
- 2013: Emmy Award for the "Development and Commercialisation for Digital Infrastructure for Local Cable Ad Insertion"
