= Ryff =

Ryff is a surname. Notable people with this surname include:

- Carol Ryff, American academic and psychologist
- Jean Ryff (1870–1944), Swiss football manager
- Petrus Ryff (1552–1629), Swiss mathematician, physician, and chronicler

== See also ==
- Ruff (surname)
