= Priscilla Busingye =

Ugandan obstetrician-gynaecologist

Priscilla Busingye, also known as Sister Priscilla, is a Ugandan physician and urogynecologist. She has headed the Association of Obstetricians and Gynaecologists of Uganda, and works at St. Joseph Nsambya hospital.

== Early life and education ==
Busingye was born in Kamwenge District, in a mud hut without any trained health workers present. Her education began with the Banyatereza Sisters, an indigenous order of Ugandan Catholic Nuns. She went to Bigodi Primary School, Kamwenge District. Her education nearly ended in 1979, when she dropped out of school at 14 years old because her father feared that she would get pregnant. In 1981, she joined Bunena Primary School in Kitagwenda District to continue her education, and later attended Maryhill High School for A-Level. Busingye pursued her undergraduate and graduate degrees in medicine at Makerere University.

== Career ==
Busingye is involved in the African Mission Healthcare program for Surgical Access for Everyone (SAFE) where women undergo free Caesarean sections, births, and repairs. Through her services, Busingye serves a population of about 10,000 through Rwibaale Hospital. Busingye has worked in Baylor Uganda as a consultant, Virika Hospital as a medical director, and other hospitals in Western Uganda. She has also taught in the University of Leeds and University of Papua New Guinea

== Awards ==
Busingye received the L'Chaim Prize from the African Mission Healthcare Gerson in 2020. She is the first African and first woman to receive the award.

== See also ==
- Health in Uganda
- Jane Aceng
- Diana Atwine
- List of Hospitals in Uganda
