= Once (dating platform) =

Online dating platform

- Type: Private
- Founded: 2015
- Founders: Jean Meyer
- Headquarters: Hong Kong
- Area served: United States, United Kingdom, Canada, France, Spain
- Products: Online dating platform
- Owner: Xeanco
- Website: www.getonce.com

Once is an online dating platform founded in 2015. The platform offers users one selected match per day for more meaningful connections.

== History ==
Once was established in 2015, the founders included dating industry entrepreneur Jean Meyer, who became a CEO of the company, as well as Guillaume Sempe and Guilhem Duche. It focused on providing a single daily match to its users. On its early stages Once secured a $3.5 million seed round from Partech Ventures and some private investors. The same year, it opened offices in Paris, and London. By 2016, it reached 1 million users.

In 2020, the company was acquired by Dating Group for $18 million. Following the acquisition, Once underwent rebranding. Alexandra Beaumont took over leadership of the brand in 2021, driving growth, rebranding, and innovation.

== Overview ==
Once provides an online dating service with a focus on thoughtful connections. Users receive one selected match per day, which encourages meaningful interactions.

The platform operates primarily in the United States, the United Kingdom, Canada, France, and Spain.

The platform is supported by Android, iOS, and Apple Watch OS.
