= Gerson Lehrman Group =

American financial and global information services company

GLG (Gerson Lehrman Group, Inc.)
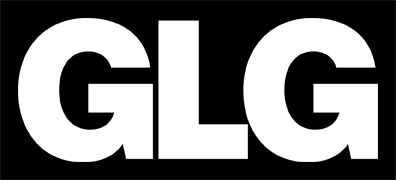
- Abbreviation: GLG
- Formation: 1998; 28 years ago
- Founder: Mark Gerson, Thomas Lehrman
- Type: Privately held company
- Headquarters: New York City
- Location: United States
- Services: Expert network; Financial services
- CEO: Gemma Postlethwaite
- Revenue: $650,000,000 (2021)
- Staff: 3,000+ (1,200,000 freelance experts) (2021)
- Website: glg.com

GLG (Gerson Lehrman Group, Inc.) is an American information services company and expert network headquartered in New York City. The company matches freelancers with corporate clients who need expert advice. It is the world's largest expert network, with over 1,000,000 freelance consultants. GLG's experts include asset managers, investors, consultants, physicians, scientists, engineers, lawyers, senior current and former c-level executives, and former government members. GLG's clients include strategy consulting corporations, hedge funds, private equity firms, professional service firms, and non-profit organizations.

The firm was founded in 1998 and has been backed by private equity firms Silver Lake Partners, Bessemer Venture Partners, and SFW Capital Partners. GLG has offices in 22 cities in 12 countries.

== History ==
Gerson Lehrman Group was founded by Yale Law School graduates Mark Gerson and Thomas Lehrman in 1998. Alexander Saint-Amand, a former Bloomberg reporter, joined GLG shortly after, and served as President & CEO until 2018.

GLG, initially funded by friends and family, was formed as a publishing house to produce industry guidebooks for institutional investors. However, the founders discovered that their clients wanted to talk directly to experts in casual conversations, rather than reading formal written reports. Accordingly, in 1999, GLG abandoned its publishing business and began offering subscriptions to its network of experts.

GLG's first customers were investors, and most of their growth from 1999 to 2005 was within the investment community. In 2006, they began working with big strategy consultancies and with companies in life sciences, chemicals and industrials, and technology. By 2010, The Wall Street Journal had described GLG as "dominating the U.S. expert networking industry".

The expert network business model has drawn scrutiny for concerns relating to adherence to disclosure rules and insider trading within the investment industry. GLG's policies include prohibitions against consultants sharing any nonpublic information about their employer or any public company, violating any ethical or legal restrictions relevant to consultants, or violating any laws.

In 2018, GLG named Paul Todd as its new CEO. Todd was previously the head of eBay's EMEA business.

GLG operates a Social Impact Fellowship that provides learning resources and expertise to certain nonprofits at no cost.

In October 2021 GLG filed to go public in an IPO, but it withdrew that offering in March 2022.

In July 2023, Gemma Postlethwaite succeeded Todd as chief executive officer.
