= Tenwek hospital =

Hospital in Bomet, Kenya

Coordinates: 0°44′36″S 35°21′35″E

AGC Tenwek Hospital Bomet
- AGC Tenwek Hospital

Geography
- Location: Bomet, Kenya

Organisation
- Care system: Mission Hospital
- Type: Teaching
- Affiliated university: Africa Gospel Church

Services
- Beds: 400
- Speciality: Emergency Medical Services, Cardiothoracic Surgery, Neurological Surgery, Orthopedic Surgery, Pediatrics, Maternity, General Surgery, Pediatric Surgery, Internal Medicine, Urology, Family Medicine

History
- Opened: 1937

Links
- Website: https://www.tenwekhosp.org/

AGC Tenwek Hospital in Bomet County, Kenya, established in 1937, is a 400-bed teaching and referral hospital offering surgical, medical, maternity, and pediatric services. It is Kenya's largest Mission Hospital.

The referral hospital receives referrals for specialised medical care and diagnostic services from throughout Kenya and surrounding African countries. Founded by missionaries, the hospital provides a broad range of secondary and tertiary care, including diagnosis of disease and team management of patient care.

== See also ==
- Healthcare in Kenya
