= On Point (KSI song) =

2018 song by KSI

Single by KSI
- Released: 17 August 2018
- Genre: Hip hop
- Length: 4:10
- Label: RBC; BMG (Note: "On Point" has been licensed to RBC Records and BMG since October 2019 after KSI signed with the record label.)
- Songwriters: Olajide Olatunji; Justin Trugman; Nima Jahanbin; Paimon Jahanbin; Kes Ingoldsby; Derico Stefano Mpyo
- Producers: JT; Wallis Lane; Kes Komara; Heat On Da Beat

KSI singles chronology
"Slow Motion" (2018)	"On Point" (2018)	"Ares" (2018)

Music video
- "On Point" on YouTube

"On Point" is a song by British YouTuber and rapper KSI. The song was produced by JT, Wallis Lane, Kes Ingoldsby and Heat On Da Beat. It was independently released for digital download and streaming on 17 August 2018 as a standalone single. "On Point" is a diss track aimed at American YouTuber Logan Paul, released in the build-up to the pair's forthcoming amateur boxing match. The song was used as KSI's entrance music for the boxing match, held on 25 August 2018 at the Manchester Arena, England, which resulted in a majority draw.

The accompanying music video was released on 17 August 2018. The video portrays KSI as an all-powerful, misunderstood villain who pursues and taunts a doppelgänger of Paul throughout a manor house. The video acts as a takedown of Paul's entire character and features doppelgängers of his friends, his brother and their parents, as well as a plethora of references to Paul's past controversies, including his infamous suicide forest controversy,. "On Point" increased the hype ahead of the pair's boxing match and was labelled as KSI's "last show of power". "On Point" received positive reviews from critics, who called it "one of the best YouTuber diss tracks to date" and credited it with taking YouTuber diss tracks to the next level.

== Background ==
After defeating British YouTuber Joe Weller in an amateur boxing match, held at the Copper Box Arena, England, on 3 February 2018, KSI challenged American YouTubers and brothers Jake Paul and Logan Paul to a boxing match. On 18 March 2018, it was announced that KSI would fight Logan Paul in an amateur boxing match, dubbed KSI vs. Logan Paul, on 25 August 2018 at the Manchester Arena, England. Two press conferences, at which the pair engaged in heated exchanges and traded insults with each other, were held in the build-up to the boxing match.

== Release and promotion ==
"On Point"
A 21-second sample of the first verse of "On Point", in which KSI disses Logan Paul and alludes to their forthcoming amateur boxing match.

On 14 August 2018, KSI posted the cover art for "On Point" to his social media pages, with the caption, "17th August", alluding to the song's release date. The cover art shows an instant photo of a blonde wig on the ground of a forest, in the centre of a black background. The next day, KSI teased the music video's release by posting a photo of himself holding a look-alike of Paul's pet dog that was taken on the set of the music video shoot to his social media pages, with the caption, "cute dog". "On Point" was independently released for digital download and streaming on 17 August 2018 as a standalone single, in the build-up to KSI's boxing match against Paul. "On Point" was used as KSI's entrance music for the boxing match, which resulted in a majority draw, with the song being played while KSI made his entrance and walked towards the boxing ring.

== Music video ==
The music video for "On Point" was co-directed by Konstantin and Meji Alabi. It was released to KSI's YouTube channel on 17 August 2018. The video immediately went viral, receiving seven million views within the first day of its release, and it has since garnered over 40 million views. The video has received 1.3 million likes and 300,000 dislikes. A behind-the-scenes video of the music video shoot was released to YouTube on the same day as the music video's release.

A doppelgänger of Logan Paul in the music video for "On Point".

The music video begins with a doppelgänger of Paul walking out of a forest, making reference to Paul's infamous suicide forest controversy, when he released a YouTube vlog in January 2018, in which he filmed the recently deceased corpse of a man who had died by hanging himself in Aokigahara, known as the "suicide forest", in Japan. Paul is accompanied by look-alikes of his entourage, comprising his friend Evan Eckenrode, his manager Jeff Levin, and his personal assistant Lydia Kenney. Paul says to the group, "And then I said, 'You can fight my dad instead!'", referring to when Paul and his brother Jake told KSI to have a boxing match against their father Greg Paul. Paul's friends laugh. Levin suddenly trips and falls to the ground, covering himself in mud, which leaves the rest of the group laughing and chanting, "brown nose". The chant appears to hypnotise a group of children who are watching on, suggesting that Paul's online content has brainwashed his young fan base. A comforting scene between Paul and Eckenrode takes place, before KSI appears, flying above them in the sky, before landing on the ground. Paul runs away, shoving Eckenrode out of the way, as Levin and Kenney cower.

KSI imitates Jack Torrance from The Shining in the music video for "On Point".

KSI chases Paul into a manor house, where upon entry, KSI is greeted by a look-alike of Paul's mother. KSI ventures further into the house in search of Paul, taunting him and shouting, "Logan! Where are you?" KSI imitates Jack Torrance from The Shining (1980), using an axe to break down a door between him and look-alikes of both Jake Paul and his friend Anthony Trujillo, before entering the room and slapping them both across the face. In the next scene, a look-alike of Paul's father appears, stepping in to protect his son from KSI, making reference to KSI's verbal exchange with Paul's father at the boxing match's second press conference in London, which led to Paul storming out of the press conference. However, Paul's father is distracted by a young, blindfolded girl, making reference to a controversial kissing prank video, released to YouTube by Jake Paul in 2017, in which their father appears. In other scenes, KSI pets a look-alike of Paul's Pomeranian dog, before sitting at a table and feasting on a banquet which includes Paul's head on a platter, making the assertion that KSI will eat Paul for dinner in their boxing match.

When Paul is reunited with his friends from the video's opening scenes, they turn against Paul and taser him, referring to when Paul was condemned for tasering two dead rats in a YouTube vlog in February 2018. In the next scene, KSI appears to kill-off look-alikes of American boy band Why Don't We, with whom Paul collaborated on his song "Help Me Help You" (2017). The video's closing scenes show KSI dramatically emerging from an ominous portal, with a nefarious smirk on his face, and confronting a kneeling and quivering Paul. Paul begs KSI to take pity and let him go. KSI, wearing the Infinity Gauntlet from Avengers: Infinity War (2018), imitates Thanos, snapping his fingers and making Paul disappear into dust, which frees the brainwashed children from watching Paul's YouTube videos.

== Critical reception ==
"On Point" was met with positive reviews from critics. Martin Domin of The Mirror wrote that the song "takes [KSI's] rivalry with Logan Paul to a whole new level" and "ramps up the hype ahead of [their boxing match]". Alicia Adejobi of Metro noted that the "music video holds no punches" and remarked that "the beef between KSI and Logan just got messier". Writing for Polygon, Julia Alexander labelled "On Point" as a "a hype track for fans in KSI’s camp". Alexander described the music video as "a five-minute takedown of Paul's entire character" and called it KSI's "last show of power" and his "final hurrah" before the pair's boxing match. Alexander observed, "The video perpetuates the character [that KSI has] painted for himself. He’s the all-powerful, misunderstood villain who wants to fight for justice on YouTube. That means defeating Paul, easily one of the most loathed creators on the platform following past controversies." Alexander continued, "There are almost too many references [in the video] to count, and many are intricate nods to past YouTube drama that are difficult to pick up on unless people are clued into the YouTube community’s daily stories." Alexander positively concluded that "On Point" is "the epitome of" and "one of the best YouTuber diss tracks to date" and "by far the most elaborate". Alexander commended, "KSI's diss track took a YouTube staple to a new level. The production quality is incredibly high and elevates the type of videos [that] his competition should be working on." Kelly Anne of TenEighty similarly acclaimed, "KSI took diss tracks to the next level... From the subtle references, to the stellar casting choices, this video really stood out from the rest in the diss track noise."

== Response ==
Three days after KSI released "On Point", Paul responded with his own diss track titled "Goodbye KSI". It has received 35 million views. On 20 July 2021, Paul interviewed KSI for an episode of his Impaulsive podcast, in which they spoke about "On Point"; Paul admitted, "It was great... I remember watching it. [There was] my family, my dog, a Japan reference, my dad being a pervert reference. I was like, 'Oh god!'. I know it's against me, but as a creator, you've got to remove your bias when possible, and I was looking at the video and I was like, 'Fuck. This is fucking great.'"

== Credits and personnel ==
Credits adapted from Tidal.

- KSI – songwriting, vocals
- JT – production, songwriting
- Wallis Lane – production, songwriting
- Kes Ingoldsby – production, songwriting
- Heat On Da Beat – production
- Derico Stefano Mpyo – songwriting
- Sway – engineering
- Charlie Cook – engineering

== Charts ==
Chart performance for "On Point"
Chart (2018)	Peak position
Scottish Singles Sales (Official Charts)	98
UK Singles Downloads (Official Charts)	86
UK Indie (Official Charts)	23

== Release history ==
Release dates and formats for "On Point"
Region	Date	Format(s)	Label(s)	Ref.
Various	17 August 2018	Digital download; streaming	Self-released	

== See also ==
- KSI vs. Logan Paul
- List of diss tracks § YouTube
