= Yu-Gi-Oh!: The Abridged Series =

Abridged web series

- Also known as: Yu-Gi-Oh Abridged; Yu-Gi-Oh!: The Cancelled Series; YGOTAS
- Genre: Abridged series; Parody; Satire
- Based on: Yu-Gi-Oh! Duel Monsters
- Developed by: Bea Billany
- Written by: Bea Billany
- Voices of: Bea Billany
- Country of origin: United Kingdom
- Original language: English
- No. of episodes: 89

Production
- Editor: Bea Billany

Original release
- Network: YouTube
- Release: 15 July 2006 – present

Yu-Gi-Oh!: The Abridged Series (Note: Commonly shortened to Yu-Gi-Oh Abridged and abbreviated as YGOTAS. Briefly retitled Yu-Gi-Oh!: The Cancelled Series) is a web series based on the anime television series Yu-Gi-Oh! Duel Monsters, itself based on the manga series Yu-Gi-Oh! by Kazuki Takahashi. Created, written and primarily voice acted by British YouTuber Bea "LittleKuriboh" Billany, the web series premiered on YouTube on 15 July 2006. Billany created the series out of her (Note: Billany, who came out as a trans woman in 2026, uses she/her pronouns.) enjoyment of Yu-Gi-Oh! and her desire to join a fandom. The series has dealt with copyright infringement issues, which has resulted in repeated removals and re-uploads on YouTube, and multiple terminations of Billany's accounts.

Labelled as a parody, The Abridged Series critiques and alters several aspects of Duel Monsters alongside other Yu-Gi-Oh!-related media, including the narrative, characters and dialogue. Its comedy comprises both pop culture references and self-referential humour. Regarded as the first abridged series, Yu-Gi-Oh!: The Abridged Series became popular online and garnered a cult following. The series was credited for establishing several characteristics of abridged anime, and inspired various similar series such as Dragon Ball Z: Abridged.

== History and production ==
Yu-Gi-Oh!: The Abridged Series was created by British YouTuber Bea Billany, known under the pseudonym LittleKuriboh. Billany stated in a 2013 interview that she became a fan of the Yu-Gi-Oh! anime after watching it alongside other early morning cartoons while dealing with insomnia. She also expressed her desire to join a fandom, picking Yu-Gi-Oh! in particular due to her enjoyment. Seeing the growing popularity of YouTube following its inception in 2005, Billany decided to make videos. She initially made several Yu-Gi-Oh parodies, including a video depicting the character Meatwad from Aqua Teen Hunger Force as an enthusiast. Inspired by the YTMND post "Yu-Gi-Oh in a Nutshell" from an internet user named "Curtdogg", Billany developed a fandub of each episode of the series. She re-edited the original episodes and performed voices for each character; though having done impressions in her childhood, Billany stated she had no vocal training before creating the series. She intended the dub to appeal to both fans of the series and those unfamiliar with it. Billany uploaded the series' first episode to the LittleKuriboh account on 15 July 2006.

The series dealt with numerous copyright infringement issues. YouTube removed several episodes in 2007, including the first episode on 8 March. Billany's original channel would eventually be terminated for the first time on 10 July. The series and channels would go through subsequent removals and terminations, leading Billany to appeal the bans, upload on the accounts "CardGamesFTW" and "Ninjabridge", and post the episodes on DailyMotion. (Note: The "CardGamesFTW" channel received an award in the "Funniest YouTube Channel" category in the 2009 Mashable Open Web Awards.) She also created the series' website in 2007, which initially hosted 22 episodes of the series, alongside The Abridged Movie (based on Pyramid of Light) and a Christmas special. Her channels and the series' episodes would eventually get reinstated and re-uploaded; the first episode of the series was re-uploaded in April 2009. The series was briefly renamed Yu-Gi-Oh!: The Cancelled Series in response to the terminations.

According to Billany, it takes her between several weeks and months to write, record and edit an episode depending on her schedule. She uploaded the 82nd episode in December 2018 which concluded the Seal of Orichalchos arc, announcing that new episodes of the final season of the show would come in 2019. However, no episodes were released in 2019, resulting in memes about episode 83's release circulating in her community. Billany revealed on Twitter in 2020 that she took her time to produce episodes due to struggles with her health. The 83rd episode was surprise-released in 2021.

== Premise and themes ==
Yu-Gi-Oh!: The Abridged Series comprises an abridgement of the Yu-Gi-Oh! Duel Monsters anime adaptation, alongside other media from the overall Yu-Gi-Oh! franchise. It depicts much of the original series' major narrative arcs and conflicts, condensed into comedic summaries with faster pacing, altered dialogue and interspersed jokes about the show. The abridgement has been labelled as a parody, pastiche, détournement, and satire of the original anime. Similar to other abridged series, it notably examines the source material in a critical manner, such as the anime's plot holes, contradictions and characterizations, while also turning them into jokes and plot devices. Much of the abridgement alters the original anime's dialogue through exaggeration and accentuation, in turn altering the show's original meaning via pastiche. It often makes humorous references to popular culture, including Neon Genesis Evangelion, Beavis and Butt-Head and "Time Warp" from The Rocky Horror Picture Show. Much of its comedy also consists of inside jokes and original humour derived from Billany herself. It is also noted for its self-aware humour and breaking of the fourth-wall.

Typical of abridged series, YGOTAS reinterprets several characters from their original canon, exaggerating their traits and portraying them as over-the-top. Villains Bakura and Marik are frequently showcased in a humorous romantic relationship throughout the series, with Marik's characterization appearing in multiple spin-offs. Among other characters, Seto Kaiba is described as more self-aware of his role in the narrative. Compared to his depiction in the original anime, outlets have labeled Kaiba's characterization as an "arrogant richboy" and "hilariously determined jerk", with one of his catchphrases being "Screw the rules, I have money!" Supporting character Mai Valentine acknowledges her sexiness; Bandit Keith is depicted as an archetypal American patriot who ends his sentences with "...in America." The series also increased the prominence of other characters such as Tristan, who attains a high-pitched voice that gives him superhuman abilities. Like the original series which featured character archetypes typical of shōnen anime, YGOTAS initially portrayed characters with established comedic archetypes, before developing their own characterizations.

The series also satirises 4Kids Entertainment, who produced the English dub localization of Duel Monsters, by highlighting numerous changes made to the show. As several scenes from the original anime were edited to eschew references to death, violence and suggestive material, YGOTAS made fun of 4Kids' censorship, such as "invisible guns" to emphasise the removal of pistols from characters' hands. It critiques the localization's cultural changes, alongside its various alterations of the character development and narrative tension from the original series. As the abridgement dealt with numerous copyright issues, it dedicated an arc to discussing copyright during its third season, where 4Kids attempts to cancel the series. Depicting 4Kids as an elusive organization while criticizing the company, the arc culminated in episode 50, which portrays a courtroom scene with the abridgement held on trial, which advocates the series as fair use.

== Reception and legacy ==
Yu-Gi-Oh!: The Abridged Series received acclaim from both journalists and fans for its humour, voice performances, and commentary of the original series. Timothy Lee of Typebar Magazine praised the series' writing, comedy, and voice acting, and cited them as factors for its longevity alongside Billany's passion for Yu-Gi-Oh. Nick Valdez of ComicBook praised its comedic handling of the original's multiple narratives, including the Seal of Orichalcos and Grand Championship arcs. Charlie Furman stated the abridgement's acclaim also stems from its interpretation of the original through showcasing differing meanings from its source material. In a retrospective article from CBR, Jeff Kotuby asserted that the series potentially surpassed the original series, and praised its numerous quotable moments and awareness compared to the original. He also claimed the abridgement "serves as a pivotal creation in the overall lexicon of YouTube videos." The outlet would also list it as an example of an abridgement surpassing the original's popularity, and the best abridged anime.

YGOTAS is considered to be the first abridged web series on YouTube. The series quickly became popular online and garnered a dedicated fan community. Billany stated that by episode 6, she noticed the series becoming discussed on forums. Lee asserted that Billany "laid the groundwork" for the abridged anime genre and defined much of its characteristics. He also opined that the series is among the best abridged series of all time. In a 2012 Transformative Works and Cultures issue, writer Zephra C. Doerr claimed it as "one of the better examples of an abridged series being accepted as a fictional universe in its own right by its fan base." The abridgement was credited for inspiring multiple abridged anime series, such as TeamFourStar's Dragon Ball Z: Abridged. (Note: Billany would later voice the character Frieza in Dragon Ball Z: Abridged.) Marik and Bakura's relationship has also become popular among fans of the series. Maxwell McGee of GamesRadar+ included the abridgement in a list of fanfiction that inspired its own fanfiction, referencing the relationship as an example of such work.
