= Nina Agdal =

Danish model (born 1992)

Nina Agdal Paul
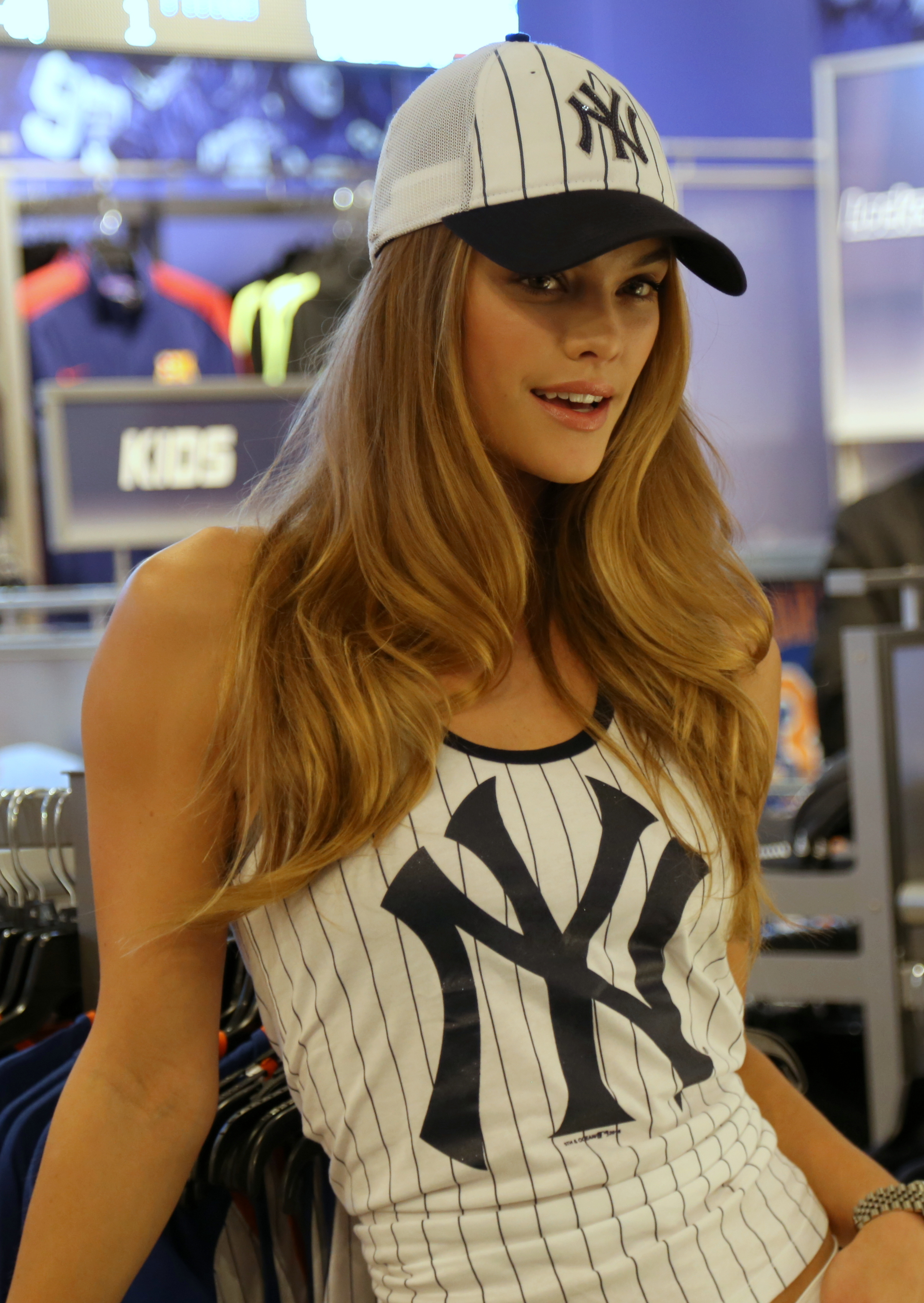
- Agdal in 2016
- Born: Nina Brohus Agdal; March 26, 1992 (age 34); Hillerød, Denmark
- Occupation: Model
- Years active: 2010–present
- Spouse: Logan Paul (m. 2025)
- Children: 1
- Modeling information
- Height: 5 ft 9 in (1.76 m)
- Hair color: Blonde
- Eye color: Green
- Agency: Elite Model Management (New York, Beverly Hills, Copenhagen); D'management Group (Milan); Iconic Management (Berlin); MP Stockholm (Stockholm); Vivien's Model Management - Sydney (Sydney)

Nina Brohus Agdal Paul (née Agdal; born March 26, 1992) is a Danish model. She is known for her appearances in the Sports Illustrated Swimsuit Issue. In 2014, she appeared on the magazine's 50th anniversary cover alongside Chrissy Teigen and Lily Aldridge.

She is married to social media influencer and professional wrestler Logan Paul.

== Early life ==
Agdal was born March 26, 1992, in Denmark, where she grew up in the town of Hillerød.

== Career ==
Agdal was discovered while on a street in her hometown. Having no modeling experience, she entered the Elite Model Look competition. She did not win, but signed with Elite Models Copenhagen and continued school until she was 18. After graduation, she moved to the United States, after which her modeling career blossomed. She has modeled for Billabong, Adore Me, Bebe Stores and Calzedonia. She has also been in fashion editorials for Vogue Mexico, Elle, Cosmopolitan, and CR fashion book by Carine Roitfeld. In 2012, she made her first appearance in the Sports Illustrated Swimsuit Issue and was subsequently named the issue's "Rookie of the Year". She also appeared on the cover of Maxim magazine for its March issue in 2017. In 2014, she appeared on the 50th anniversary cover of the Sports Illustrated Swimsuit Issue with Chrissy Teigen and Lily Aldridge, which she regards as the "highlight" of her modeling career.

Agdal appeared in a 2013 Super Bowl television commercial for Carl's Jr./Hardee's. In August 2016, she signed with IMG Models.

== Personal life ==
In 2022, Agdal began dating influencer and professional wrestler Logan Paul. The couple became engaged in July 2023, welcomed a daughter in September 2024, and married in Lake Como, Italy in August 2025.

Since 2023, Agdal has been involved in a public feud with Bellator fighter Dillon Danis. Danis continuously shared images of Agdal on social media. Agdal filed a lawsuit and on September 8, 2023, Agdal was granted a temporary restraining order. The lawsuit is still ongoing.

== Filmography ==
- Don Jon (2013) as Supermodel in commercial (cameo)
- Ridiculousness (2015; 2023-2024) as Herself/Guest
- Entourage (2015) as Bridgite (cameo)
- Love Advent (2017) as Herself; Episode: Nina Agdal
- Lip Sync Battle (2017) as Herself; Episode: David Spade vs Nina Agdal
- Paul American (2025) as Herself; main cast
