= Dillon Danis =

American mixed martial artist (born 1993)

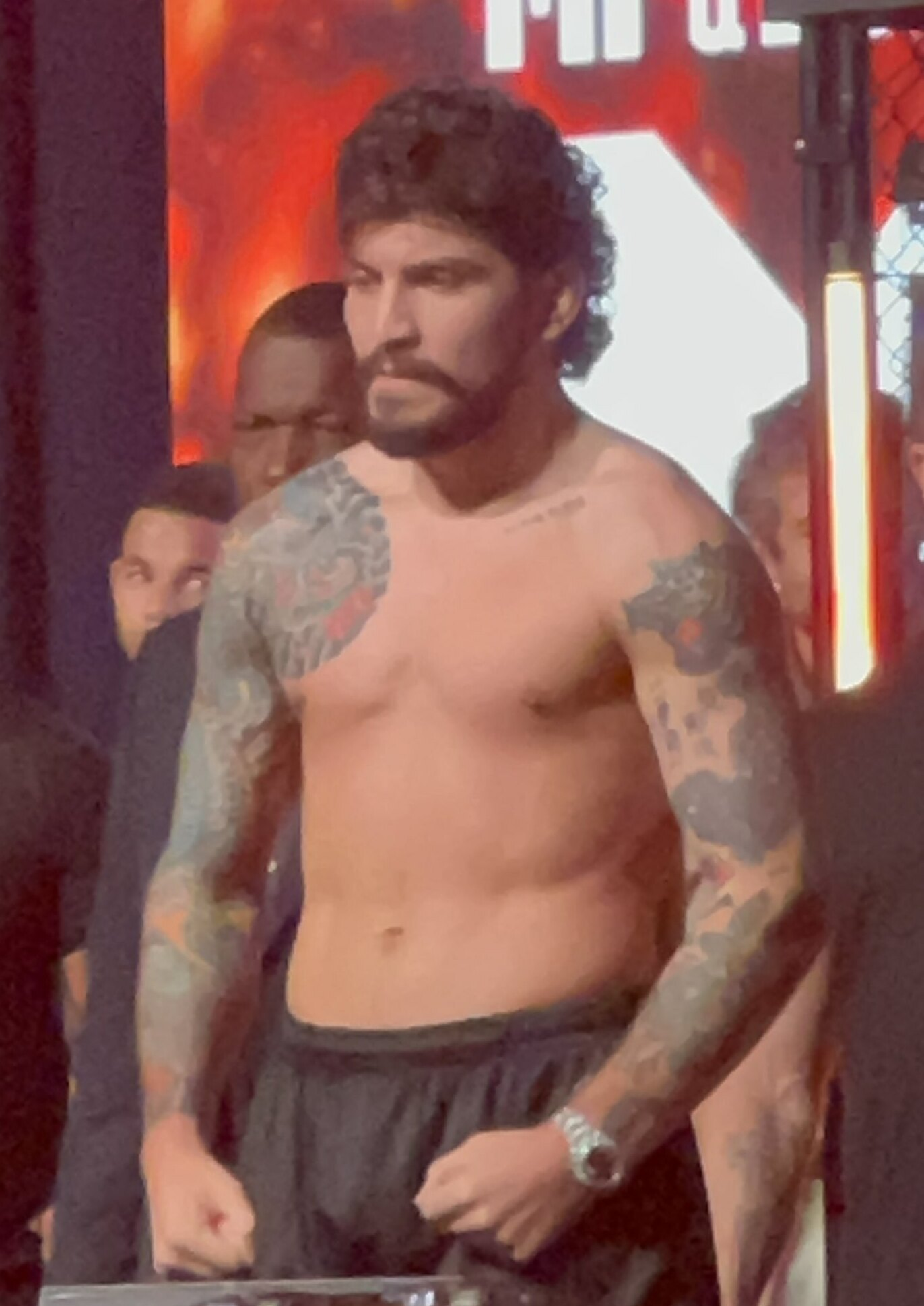
- Danis in 2023
- Born: August 22, 1993 (age 33); Parsippany–Troy Hills, New Jersey, U.S.
- Other names: El Jefe • Double D
- Height: 6 ft 0 in (1.83 m)
- Weight: 180 lb (82 kg; 13 st)
- Division: Welterweight (2018–present)
- Reach: 72 in (183 cm)
- Style: Brazilian Jiu-Jitsu
- Fighting out of: New York City, New York, U.S.
- Team: SBG Ireland
- Rank: Black belt in Brazilian Jiu-Jitsu under Marcelo Garcia
- Years active: 2014–2017 (grappling); 2018–present (MMA); 2023 (boxing)

Professional boxing record
- Total: 1
- Losses: 1

Mixed martial arts record
- Total: 3
- Wins: 3
- By submission: 3
- Losses: 0

Other information
- Mixed martial arts record from Sherdog

Dillon Danis (born August 22, 1993) is an American mixed martial artist. He currently competes in Misfits as part of their MMA division, where he is the current Misfits MMA Light Heavyweight (175lbs) Champion. Danis is also signed to the Cruiserweight division of Real American Freestyle (RAF).

Trained in Brazilian Jiu-Jitsu, Danis previously competed in the Pan Jiu-Jitsu No-Gi Championship. He then transitioned to MMA as a Welterweight, debuting at Bellator 198 against Kyle Walker and winning via a toe hold in the first round. Danis then faced Max Humphreys at Bellator 222 and won via armbar in the first round. He was involved in a melee at UFC 229 after Khabib Nurmagomedov proceeded to throw his mouthpiece and then scaled the cage and appeared to jump towards him. He was subsequently fined $7,500 and suspended for 7 months following the incident.

Throughout his career, Danis has become the subject of many controversies due to his behaviour. In boxing, he was scheduled to face British YouTuber KSI at MF & DAZN: X Series 004, but withdrew due to lack of preparation and coaching. In his debut professional boxing match, he was defeated by American YouTuber Logan Paul via disqualification.

== Background ==
Born to a Honduran mother and Armenian father, raised in Parsippany–Troy Hills, New Jersey, Danis attended Parsippany Hills High School and started wrestling there as a freshman, despite the fact that he "couldn't do one pushup". He started training in Brazilian Jiu-Jitsu at the age of 15 after he was involved in a fight at school. At age 17, Danis started making trips to Marcelo Garcia's academy in New York and at age 19, he eventually moved to New York in order to actively pursue a career in Brazilian Jiu-Jitsu. After wins at various high-level tournaments he was awarded his black belt at 21 years of age.

== MMA career ==
In 2016, Danis came to light in the mixed martial arts community when he was asked to join the training camp of UFC fighter Conor McGregor as a coach and training partner ahead of his rematch against Nate Diaz at UFC 202. He would continue to work with Conor, helping him to prepare for the Khabib Nurmagomedov bout. Due to his image in the media prior to the fight with Diaz, Marcelo Garcia disassociated Danis from his school.

=== Bellator MMA (2018–2019) ===
In 2018, Danis was scheduled to make his own MMA debut at Bellator 198 against Kyle Walker. He won via a toe hold in the first round of the fight. Danis' next fight was against Max Humphreys in 2019 at Bellator 222 at a catchweight of 175 lbs. Danis won the fight via armbar in the first round. Danis was originally scheduled to fight again in 2020, against Kegan Gennrich at Bellator 238. Previous to the scheduled bout, however, Danis received an injury and was forced to withdraw.

Danis confirmed in 2023 that he had two fights left on his Bellator contract and intended to complete both of them in 2023, along with at least one more fight after.

On October 21, 2023, it was reported by Ariel Helwani that Danis had been released from his Bellator contract. Danis hit the free agency market and aimed to get a deal with the UFC, but stated his intention to not participate in MMA again if he did not get signed. A month after his exit from Bellator, Danis subsequently announced his retirement from combat sports on November 15, 2023.

=== Global Fight League (2025) ===
On January 24, 2025 it was announced that Danis had signed with Global Fight League as part of their New York team under the welterweight division managed by Ray Longo. Originally, Danis was scheduled to face former interim UFC lightweight champion Tony Ferguson as the headliner for GFL 2 on May 25, but on April 9 both GFL 1 and GFL 2 were postponed indefinitely.

=== Misfits MMA (2025–present) ===
On July 20, 2025 Misfits Boxing announced that Danis and influencer Warren Spencer would partake in an MMA match on the Misfits 22 – Ring of Thrones undercard, launching their MMA division. The event took place on August 30 at Manchester Arena in Manchester, England for the inaugural MF MMA light heavyweight title (175 Ibs limit). Danis won the bout by mounted guillotine-choke submission fifteen seconds into the first round and was crowned the inhouse champion. After the bout, Danis faced off with strongman Eddie Hall.

On November 3, Misfits co-president Mams Taylor announced that Danis would make his first title defense on the Misfits Mania – The Fight Before Christmas undercard, set to take place on December 20 at the Dubai Duty Free Tennis Stadium in Dubai, UAE. One week later, Danis' opponent was confirmed to be Anthony Taylor. However, on December 5 following an altercation involving Islam Makhachev's team at UFC 322, Danis was removed from the card after not being medically cleared to compete.

=== Other promotions (2026) ===
Danis was scheduled to face Mike Perry on August 29, 2026 at DuelBit's inaugural combat sports event Duel Arena 1, promoted by the online casino Duel. However, 48 hours before the bout, Danis withdrew for undisclosed reasons and was replaced by Brandon Jenkins. Danis later posted a video on social media that showed that he had suffered a laceration on his arm that required stiches.

== Grappling career ==
On May 9, 2015, Danis fought UFC veteran Joe Lauzon at Metamoris 6. Danis won via a D'arce choke.

On October 29, 2016, Danis fought at Polaris Pro Grappling 4 against Jackson Sousa. Danis won via an inside heel hook. He also participated in Polaris 5 at a catchweight (-78 kg) where he lost a judges decision to Garry Tonon.

Danis overall holds a grappling record of 18 wins and 16 losses, and is a seven time tournament winner. Eleven of his eighteen wins were by submission, while only one out of his 16 losses was by being submitted.

Danis was set to face UFC lightweight contender Arman Tsarukyan at Hype FC in May 2026, but the bout was cancelled for undisclosed reasons.

== Boxing career ==
=== Original cancelled bout with KSI ===
On November 18, 2022, Danis made an appearance at the press conference for MF & DAZN: X Series 003 where he confronted British YouTuber KSI. During the broadcast on November 19, it was announced that Danis would face KSI on January 14, 2023, at Wembley Arena in London, England as the headliner to X Series 004. However, Danis withdrew on January 4 with Mams Taylor, promoter and matchmaker for Misfits Boxing, stating the reason being that he is "underprepared, he [Danis] has no coach, he might be struggling with weight." Danis was replaced by Brazilian YouTuber FaZe Temperrr.

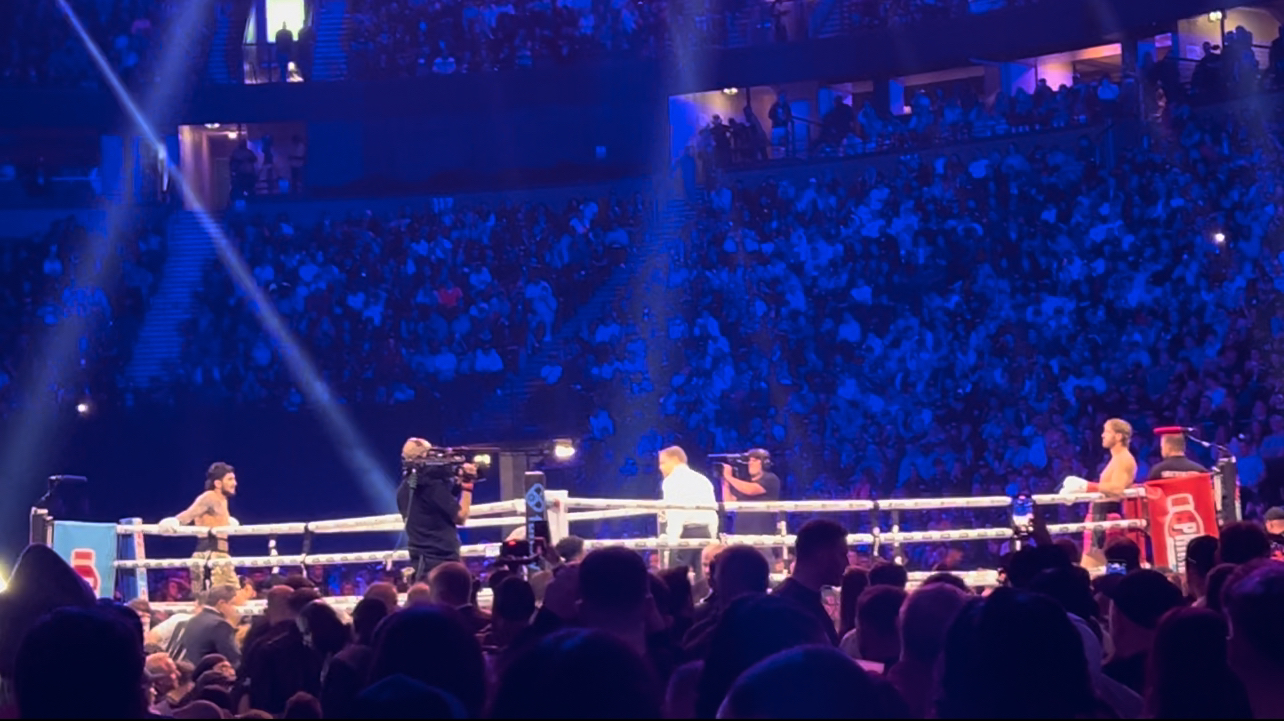
Paul and Danis moments before the start of their bout.

=== Danis vs Paul ===
On August 8, 2023, it was announced that Danis would face American YouTuber Logan Paul as the second main event for X Series 10 – The Prime Card alongside KSI vs Tommy Fury on October 14 at Manchester Arena in Manchester, England.

During the bout, Danis was disqualified in the sixth round after attempting a takedown and an illegal choke. Immediately after, a brawl broke out in the ring and security intervened. Danis later announced his intention to appeal the disqualification loss. On October 21, 2023, Danis officially submitted an appeal of the decision. The decision was not changed.

=== Second cancelled bout with KSI ===
On February 4, 2025, it was announced that Danis' bout with KSI would be rebooked for March 29 headlining Misfits 21 – Unfinished Business at Manchester Arena in Manchester. Originally, KSI was scheduled to face English former footballer Wayne Bridge, but the bout was cancelled after Bridge withdrew on 20 January resulting in Danis signing on as the replacement opponent. On 21 March, it was announced that the fight will be postponed due to KSI suffering from an illness. On 4 April, Misfits Boxing co-president Mams Taylor confirmed on X that Misfits 22 – Blinders & Brawls was moved from 12 April to 16 May, and will be their next event, confirming that Misfits 21 – Unfinished Business was no longer happening.

== Wrestling career ==
Danis signed to the Cruiserweight division of Real American Freestyle (RAF), where he lost his debut match to Colby Covington at RAF 07 on March 28, 2026.

He headlined RAF 10 on June 13, 2026 against Khamzat Chimaev in a 205 pound catchweight bout. He lost the match via pinfall.

Danis faced Arman Tsarukyan for the inaugural RAF Middleweight Crossover Championship in the main event of RAF 14 on October 23, 2026. Danis lost the match by technical fall.

== Championships and accomplishments ==
=== Brazilian Jiu-Jitsu ===
- IBJJF Pan Jiu-Jitsu No-Gi Championship
  - Purple belt medio: 3rd place (2012)
  - Brown belt medio: 2nd place (2013)
  - Brown belt medio: 1st place (2014)
  - Black belt pesado: 1st place (2016)
- IBJJF New York Spring International Open
  - Brown belt medio: 2nd place (2015)
  - Brown belt open class: 1st place (2015)
- IBJJF New York Summer International Open
  - Brown belt medio: 1st place (2014)
- IBJJF Boca Raton International Open
  - Black belt medio: 1st place (2015)
- IBJJF World Jiu-Jitsu Championships
  - Brown belt medio: 2nd place (2014)

=== Mixed martial arts ===
- Misfits Boxing
  - MF MMA Light Heavyweight Championship (Inaugural, first, current)

== Controversies ==
=== UFC 229 Nurmagomedov–McGregor post-fight incident ===
At UFC 229, Danis—a member of Conor McGregor's corner team—was involved in a melee when Khabib Nurmagomedov, after submitting McGregor, proceeded to throw his mouthpiece at McGregor's corner team and then scaled the cage and appeared to jump towards Danis. Danis responded by throwing punches at Khabib before an all-out brawl ensued. Longtime UFC commentator Joe Rogan has claimed that Danis was insulting Nurmagomedov in an attempt to provoke him stating, "Dillon (Danis) was absolutely insulting Khabib, saying something to him and provoking him and then Khabib just jumped over the cage and attacked him". Danis was subsequently fined $7,500 and suspended for 7 months following the incident. Danis did not comment publicly until March 11, 2019, where he told Ariel Helwani on the ESPN MMA podcast that Khabib started taunting him in the second or third round and was aggressive throughout the event.

=== New Jersey arrest ===
Danis was arrested on September 18, 2021, after getting into an altercation with a bouncer outside a nightclub in New Jersey where Danis was overpowered, restrained, and nearly choked out. Danis later claimed that the bouncer and bartenders from the nightclub were at fault for the altercation, and that officers released him after approximately twenty minutes.

=== ADCC PEDs accusations ===
In October 2021, Danis accused UFC veteran Jake Shields of offering him PEDs prior to the 2017 ADCC Submission Fighting World Championship.

=== UFC 268 altercation ===
Danis was removed from the building at UFC 268 on November 6, 2021, after getting into an altercation with MMA manager Ali Abdelaziz where he was slapped by Abdelaziz.

=== Endorsement of cryptocurrency scams ===
In February 2023, Stephen "Coffeezilla" Findeisen, a YouTuber known for exposing cryptocurrency scams, accused Danis of accepting cash to promote cryptocurrency and NFT scams to his social media followers without performing due diligence. Findeisen's team paid Danis $1,000 to promote a fake NFT project on his Twitter account, which actually contained a link to a website listing 20 cryptocurrency and NFT projects that Danis endorsed and Findeisen claims are scams. According to Insider, Danis is yet to issue a response to the allegations.

=== Nina Agdal case ===
During the build up to his boxing match with Logan Paul on October 14, 2023, Danis continuously shared images of Paul's fiancé Nina Agdal on social media. Agdal filed a lawsuit and on September 8, Agdal was granted a temporary restraining order. In 2024, Danis' legal representation filed a motion to withdraw.

=== UFC 322 altercation and banning ===
Danis was involved in a brawl with several members of UFC champion Islam Makhachev’s team at UFC 322 on November 15, 2025 at Madison Square Garden. The scuffle broke out cageside just moments before the main card began, which featured Makhachev headlining a welterweight title bout against Jack Della Maddalena. Multiple videos captured Danis clashing with Makhachev teammates Abubakar Nurmagomedov and Magomed Zaynukov. During the UFC 322 post-fight press conference, Dana White told reporters he wouldn't press charges against Danis but suggested the 32-year-old would no longer be welcome at future UFC events.

== Personal life ==
In August 2023, Danis announced the birth of his first child, a son, but did not share his name or the identity of his son's mother.

On September 1, in the buildup to his bout against Logan Paul, Danis shared the first picture of himself holding his infant son. Currently, Danis' public relationship status is single.

== Mixed martial arts record ==
=== Professional ===
Professional record breakdown
3 matches	3 wins	0 losses
By submission	3	0

Res.	Record	Opponent	Method	Event	Date	Round	Time	Location	Notes
Win	3–0	Warren Spencer	Submission (guillotine choke)	Misfits 22 – Ring of Thrones	August 30, 2025	1	0:15	Manchester, England	Won the inaugural MF MMA Light Heavyweight Championship.
Win	2–0	Max Humphrey	Submission (armbar)	Bellator 222	June 14, 2019	1	4:28	New York City, New York, United States	Catchweight (175 lb) bout.
Win	1–0	Kyle Walker	Submission (toe hold)	Bellator 198	April 28, 2018	1	1:38	Rosemont, Illinois, United States	Catchweight (175 lb) bout.

== MF–Professional boxing record ==
1 fight	0 wins	1 loss
By disqualification	0	1

No.	Result	Record	Opponent	Type	Round, time	Date	Location	Notes
1	Loss	0–1	Logan Paul	DQ	6 (6), 2:55	Oct 14, 2023	Manchester Arena, Manchester, England	

== Submission grappling record ==
9 Matches, 5 Wins, 4 Losses
Result	Rec.	Opponent	Method	Event	Date	
Loss	5–4	(United States) Gordon Ryan	Referee Decision	ADCC 2017	September 23, 2017	Espoo, Finland
Win	5–3	(Japan) Yukiyasu Ozawa	N/A	ADCC 2017	September 23, 2017	Espoo, Finland
Loss	4–3	(Brazil) Mahamed Aly	N/A	ADCC 2017	September 23, 2017	Espoo, Finland
Loss	4–2	(United States) Jake Shields	N/A	Submission Underground 4	May 14, 2017	Portland, OR, United States
Win	4–1	(United States) AJ Agazarm	N/A	Submission Underground 3	January 29, 2017	Portland, OR, United States
Loss	3–1	(Brazil) Max Gimenis	N/A	Copa Podio	July 9, 2016	Palermo, Buenos Aires, Argentina
Win	3–0	(United States) Joe Lauzon	Submission (D'Arce Choke)	Metamoris 6	May 9, 2015	California, United States
Win	2–0	(United States) Jonathan Satava	N/A	2014 IBJJF World Jiu Jitsu No-Gi Championship	October 5, 2014	Azusa, California, United States
Win	1-0	(United States) Mansher Khera	N/A	2014 IBJJF World Jiu Jitsu No-Gi Championship	October 5, 2014	Azusa, California, United States

== Freestyle wrestling record ==
Freestyle matches
Res.	Record	Opponent	Score	Date	Event	Location
Loss	0–3	(Armenia) Arman Tsarukyan	TF 0-10	October 23, 2026	RAF 14	(United States) Las Vegas, Nevada
Loss	0–2	(Russia) Khamzat Chimaev	Fall	June 13, 2026	RAF 10	(United States) St. Louis, Missouri
Loss	0–1	(United States) Colby Covington	TF 4–14	March 28, 2026	RAF 07	(United States) Tampa, Florida

== Pay-per-view bouts ==
United Kingdom
No.	Date	Fight	Billing	Network	Buys	Revenue	Source(s)
1	14 October 2023	Paul vs Danis	Judgement Day	DAZN	1,300,000	£26,000,000	
Total					1,300,00	£26,000,000	

== See also ==
- List of mixed martial artists with professional boxing records
- List of multi-sport athletes
