= TeamFourStar =

YouTube channel

- TeamFourStar logo

YouTube information
- Channel: TeamFourStar
- Years active: 2008–present
- Genres: Anime; comedy; parody
- Subscribers: 4.45 million
- Views: 2.6 billion
- Last updated: August 2026
- Website: teamfourstar.com

TeamFourStar is a YouTube channel and production company most notable for the creation of the comedy web series Dragon Ball Z Abridged, an abridged parody of the anime television series Dragon Ball Z. Noted for its satirical humor of various story elements from the original anime, the series became popular online and garnered praise from both fans and critics alike. However, in 2020, the group decided to end the series after producing episodes for 11 years. They have also created several abridged series for other anime, such as Hellsing Ultimate Abridged (based on Hellsing Ultimate) and Toonami Abridged (based on multiple anime series broadcast on Toonami, including Sailor Moon and Yu Yu Hakusho).

== Career ==
=== Origins and Dragon Ball Z Abridged ===
TeamFourStar was created in 2008 by members Scott "KaiserNeko" Frerichs, Nick "Lanipator" Landis, and Curtis "Takahata101" Arnott. That same year, they created the Dragon Ball Z Abridged series, a non-profit parody abridged series consisting of footage from the titular Dragon Ball Z anime interspersed with dark humor. The abridged series satirized various story aspects of the Dragon Ball Z universe, such as the power level system and the "over 9000" meme, the appearance of character Broly in the movie Broly: The Legendary Super Saiyan, and the general dialogue and humor of the original series. Since its creation in 2008, the series garnered online popularity as many of the episodes accumulated millions of views.

In 2014, TeamFourStar's channel was listed amongst the Google Preferred program. Despite this, their channel dealt with copyright issues due to their usage of Dragon Ball Z footage, with Toei Animation sending them numerous copyright strikes as a protective measure for their properties. These copyright issues led to the channel temporarily removing the Dragon Ball Z Abridged series on YouTube along with their channel briefly going offline, and was one of the main factors for the ending of the series.

==== Ending of Dragon Ball Z Abridged ====
Many shows lose steam as time goes on as the creators extend their work far beyond its natural lifespan; we're feeling that with this, and that's a scary, depressing thought... And yes, we know, there's more story to work with. But in all honesty... there just isn't the emotional attachment and passion for the arc that drove the last three seasons... Copyright claims have put us at risk of losing that channel, and our livelihoods in jeopardy... We've thought about hosting DBZA on other sites, but nowhere has been safe, and worse, it would serve to draw attention away from our hub, which ultimately could lead to less views, less support, and either the scaling back or collapse of our company.

— Gaming outlet Kotaku citing a Patreon post from Scott Frerichs.

In 2018, TeamFourStar released episode 60 of Dragon Ball Z Abridged after the series went on a year of hiatus, ending on episode 59 with a cliffhanger. The channel initially promised a fourth season that would focus on the Buu Saga, the final arc of the original anime. However, in 2020, TeamFourStar decided to end the series, citing the changing climate of YouTube in regards to copyright.

=== Other series and ventures ===
TeamFourStar worked on an abridged parody of Hellsing Ultimate from 2010 to 2018, which retained the original series' dark tone while reinterpreting the character Alucard as wittier and more enthusiastic. In 2017, TeamFourStar moved into official dubbing work, producing the English dub of the anime feature film Hells. They have also worked on an abridged series for Final Fantasy VII named Final Fantasy 7: Machinabridged.

Several years after Dragon Ball Z Abridged's end, TeamFourStar collaborated with YouTuber Totally Not Mark in August 2023 to create a series of clips from the Buu Saga. They were dubbed as "Buu Bits", with most of the original cast returning. In November 2025, TeamFourStar released the first episode of their series Toonami Abridged – Sailor Moon, an abridged parody of the Sailor Moon anime. The channel collaborated with Totally Not Mark again for a parody of Dragon Ball Daima titled Dragon Ball Magic, released in December 2025.

== Reception ==
TeamFourStar's Dragon Ball Z Abridged series has received acclaim from both critics and fans alike, many of them extolling it for both its faithfulness to the original anime and its satirical depiction of the series' different tropes. Joe Ballard from CBR praised the abridged parody for its combination of humor surrounding the characters along with its sense of realism, stating that "where Dragon Ball Abridged really shines is with its ability to balance its humor with an added sense of awareness and realism that doesn't really appear in the original series." Writing for pop culture outlet The Mary Sue, assistant editor Princess Weekes gave praise to the series for its storytelling, voice acting and humor, stating that it "give(s) you the best crash course into the franchise by having a very character driven narrative with a lot of jokes and a real Rick & Morty sense of talking about the universe." She went on to further elaborate that "DBZA is a labor of love, and you see that with every joke, the voice acting, and the time taken to make each edit work seamlessly into the next. It is a triumph of storytelling and modernizes the series for viewers today." Jake Draugelis from ClickOnDetroit remarked that the allure of the series derived from their retaining of "the spirit of the original anime intact as they parody it... The tendency for other abridged series is to lose their heart on the path to funniness, but the good folks at Team Four Star have gotten so good at voicing DBZ characters that they have been asked to do voice work in official DBZ properties."

Some outlets have even considered the abridged series to be superior to the original in various aspects. Nick Valdez from ComicBook asserted that the series "added the necessary layers the original Dragon Ball Z anime was missing." He went on to commend the abridged series for its ability to take itself less seriously than the original series: "While fans were able to find the fun in all of the fights and frenetic animation, Abridged drops the pretense of the series' coolness and pokes fun at the series' more wild elements." In a listicle from CBR which compared the abridged series to the original, Brian Sheridan asserted that the series triumphed over the original in terms of its voice acting, character and plot development, and its dialogue and humor.

As of August 2026, TeamFourStar's channel has reached over 4.45 million subscribers and 2.6 billion views.
