= KSI vs Logan Paul =

2018 amateur YouTube boxing match

KSI vs. Logan Paul
- The official poster for KSI vs Logan Paul.
- Date: 25 August 2018
- Venue: Manchester Arena, Manchester, England
- Title(s) on the line: WBC Amateur (YouTube I) cruiserweight title

Tale of the tape
Boxer	(England) KSI	(United States) Logan Paul
Nickname	The Nightmare	The Maverick
Hometown	Watford, England	Westlake, Ohio, U.S.
Pre-fight record	1–0 (1 KO)	0–0
Age	25 years, 2 months	23 years, 4 months
Height	5 ft 11 in (180 cm)	6 ft 2 in (188 cm)
Weight	187.2 lb (84.9 kg)	189.6 lb (86 kg)
Style	Orthodox	Orthodox

Result
- 6-round majority draw (58–57, 57–57, 57–57)

Deji vs. Jake Paul
Tale of the tape
Boxer	(United Kingdom) Deji Olatunji	(United States) Jake Paul
Nickname	The Tank	The Problem Child
Hometown	Watford, England	Westlake, Ohio, USA
Pre-fight record	0–0	0–0
Age	21 years, 8 months	21 years, 7 months
Height	5 ft 9 in (175 cm)	6 ft 1 in (185 cm)
Weight	174.4 lb (79 kg)	181.9 lb (83 kg)
Style	Southpaw	Orthodox

Result
- Paul wins via 5th-round TKO

KSI vs Logan Paul was a white-collar amateur crossover boxing match between English influencer KSI and American influencer Logan Paul. The undercard featured several influencers, including a match between the younger brothers of the main event fighters, Deji Olatunji and Jake Paul. The bout took place on 25 August 2018 at the Manchester Arena in Manchester, England. It was streamed on YouTube's pay-per-view platform and ended in a majority draw, with two judges scoring it 57–57 and the other judge scoring it 58–57 in favour of KSI.

The fight was promoted as "the biggest internet event in history" and "the biggest amateur boxing match in history". It sold 1.3 million PPV buys. The rematch took place on 9 November 2019 at the Staples Center in Los Angeles, this time as a professional boxing match.

== Background ==
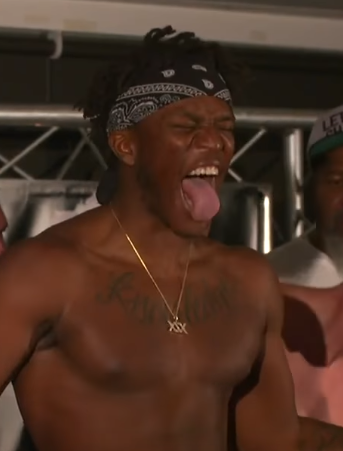
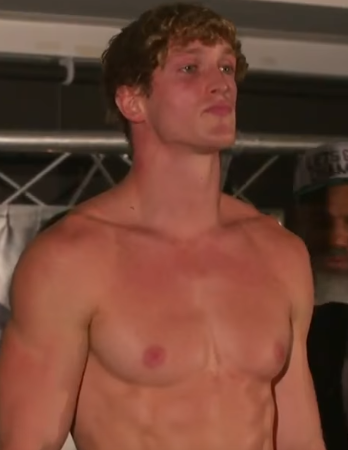
KSI (left) was going into his second boxing match while Logan Paul (right) was making his boxing debut the night of the bout.

KSI's fight with fellow British influencer Joe Weller, another Upload Agency event, was viewed by millions. The fight took place on 3 February 2018 at the Copper Box Arena in London. Joe Weller, who had never previously boxed as an amateur or professional, faced KSI. After KSI emerged as the winner and was awarded the YouTube Boxing Championship belt, an unofficial and unrecognised belt created for this event, he called out the Paul brothers, Jake and Logan. Initially, KSI challenged Jake Paul, Logan Paul's younger brother, to a fight. However, Jake backed down, allowing Logan to step in and fight KSI. At the same time, Jake fought KSI's younger brother, Deji Olatunji, also known as ComedyShortsGamer at the time. Deji had reservations about fighting on the undercard, so it was agreed that the fight would be advertised with both Deji and Jake's names listed as a co-main event, ensuring equal importance for both pairs.

The two parties signed contracts for two fights, and on March 18 2018, the fight was officially announced with a trailer on KSI's YouTube channel. The first fight was scheduled for 25 August 2018 at the Manchester Arena in England, and the second fight was planned for February 2019 in the United States. Originally, Logan and Jake Paul preferred a neutral venue, preferably Dubai, United Arab Emirates, but Logan ultimately agreed to the two-fight plan.

During an interview with TMZ on 23 July 2018, KSI revealed his aspirations of turning professional after the fight. He stated, "I wanna squeeze out every bit of relevancy from him (Logan Paul) and then move onto my bigger goal which is to go pro".

=== Press conferences ===
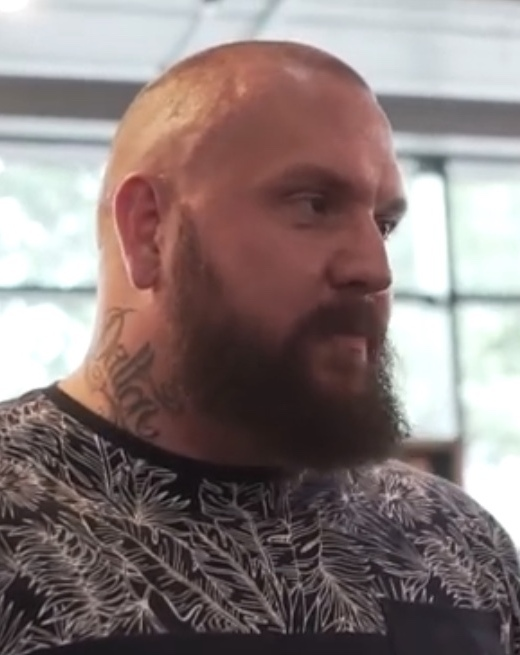
True Geordie commentated on the fight

Two press conferences were held to promote the fight. The first took place on 16 June outside the Los Angeles Memorial Coliseum in Los Angeles and was hosted by two-time heavyweight champion Shannon Briggs.

The second press conference occurred on 18 July at York Hall in London. This time, it was hosted by YouTube personality True Geordie, who had provided commentary for the KSI vs Joe Weller fight. During the London press conference, KSI and Deji ridiculed Logan, Jake, Logan's then-girlfriend Chloe Bennet, and his father Greg Paul to such an extent that both Paul brothers left the press conference prematurely.

Following the press conference, fans of KSI and Deji attacked Logan and Jake's rental cars, which were arranged by their friend and Las Vegas nightclub promoter Arman Izadi. Izadi threatened Deji with a lawsuit, accusing him of inciting the fans to attack the Pauls and challenging Izadi to a bare-knuckle fight. Deji denied these accusations and stated, "the attack resulted from other factors, including the fact that Greg Paul actually assaulted a fan first.” Thereafter associates of Izadi would subsequently vandalise the gym that Deji trained in. Izadi admitted responsibility, prompting Deji to have officials for the event ban Izadi from attending.

=== Weigh-in ===
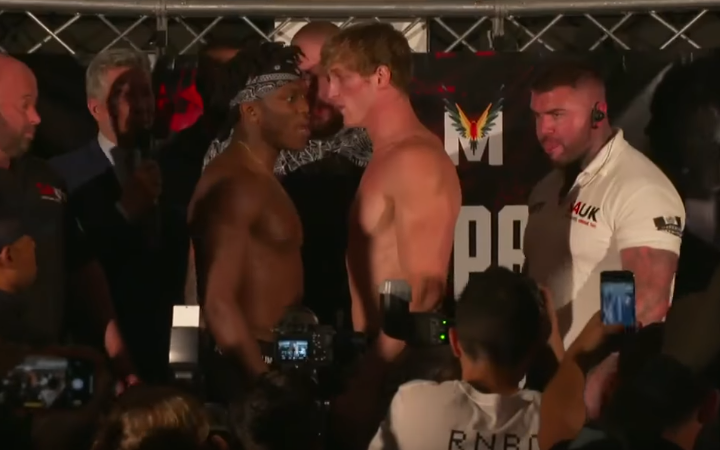
KSI and Logan Paul facing off during the weigh-in

The weigh-in was held on 24 August 2018 and was co-hosted by the same host as the London press conference, True Geordie, as well as professional boxing announcer Michael Buffer. KSI weighed in at 187.2lb (84.9kg), 1.9kg heavier than his previous fight with Joe Weller. Meanwhile, Logan Paul came in at 189.6lb (86kg). KSI took part in the weigh-in wearing a mask of the face of Chloe Bennet, Logan's girlfriend at the time, in an attempt to taunt Logan and use psychological warfare. For the co-main event, Deji weighed in at 174.4lb (79.1kg) with Jake Paul weighing in at 181.9lb (82.5kg).

=== Card ===
On the fight's undercard, JMX was expected to fight TGFbro's Romell Henry, but Henry later pulled out due to injury and was replaced by HalalHam. It was later revealed that JMX would instead be fighting influencer and athlete Coach Richard; HalalHam faced off against Jrizzy Jeremy.

AnEsonGib fought TGFbro's Jay Swingler on the event's undercard. Michael Philippou from RackaRacka also boxed Scarce and won by technical knockout.

== Fight details ==
=== Ticket information ===
The fight was held at the Manchester Arena in Manchester, England. Tickets for the fight went on sale on 22 June after an announcement by KSI on his YouTube channel. General admission tickets started at a price of £30 with the highest level package pricing at £495. They had elected to go with Eventim UK for distribution of sales. Tickets made available priced from £30, £40, £50, £60, £80, £100, £150 and VIP £495. Although the event was jointly promoted by Upload Events, Maverick Media and OP Talent, Upload Events were the lead promoter of the fight.

=== Broadcasting ===
The fight was streamed on pay-per-view on YouTube, through a dedicated YouTube channel for the event. The pay-per-view was priced at $10 in the United States. However, the pricing received negative feedback from several fans, considering that KSI's previous fight with Joe Weller had been streamed on YouTube for free. The fight featured commentary from YouTube personalities: True Geordie, Joe Weller, and Laurence McKenna. Additionally, the fighters were announced by the iconic ring announcer, Michael Buffer.

==== Piracy concerns ====
Due to the event's high profile in the social and online world, along with the utilisation of pay-per-view instead of the usual free YouTube streaming, promoters became concerned about pirate streams of the fight. In a video by Jake Paul, he stated that "anyone who is planning on illegally streaming or torrenting the fight won't be able to as employees from Google and YouTube will be taking down and disabling streams all through the night." However, this did not dissuade fans from promoting illegal streams as a form of protest against the implementation of pay-per-view.

KSI addressed the use of pay-per-view via Twitter stating, "The cost of the event itself is on another level to last time (the KSI vs Joe Weller fight). Plus the press conferences, weigh-in and making other content for the new channel, all adds up."

After the fight, it was revealed that over 1.2 million people had watched pirated Twitch streams, resulting in an estimated loss of pay-per-view revenue of approximately $8-10 million.

=== Purses ===
The purse for the fight is split 50/50. Although official details haven't been revealed, there have been estimates of their potential earnings. According to one estimate, the total revenue is believed to be £150 million, including lucrative sponsorship deals that the pair signed, with KSI and Logan Paul each receiving up to £75 million. Another estimate gives the potential earnings of KSI and Logan Paul at £30 million to £40 million each, from ticket sales, online views, sponsorship deals, and merchandise sales. However, both KSI and Logan Paul have dismissed these estimates. KSI stated that his earnings are "a high amount, but it's nowhere near £40m" or £20 million.

=== Belt ===
With the result being a draw, KSI retained the YouTube World Championship belt. An unofficial and unrecognised belt that was created for this event.

=== Officials and rules ===
- Referee: Gareth Morris
- Judges: Delilah Ponce, Gino Piccinino and Gareth Morris

The main event was contested over 6 rounds 3 minutes each.

=== Betting odds ===
Result	Bet365	SkyBet	Ladbrokes	William Hill
KSI	11/10	1	6/5	6/5
Logan Paul	4/6	4/5	8/13	8/14
Draw	—N/a	18	16	16

Odds as of 24 August 2018.

== Fight card ==
	vs.		Method	Round		Notes
KSI	vs	Logan Paul	MD	6/6	YouTube World Championship Title	(Note: For YouTube World Championship title, an unofficial and unrecognised title created specifically for this event)
Jake Paul	def.	Deji Olatunji	TKO	5/6	WBC YouTube Championship Title
AnEsonGib	def.	Jay Swingler	UD	4/4
Momo	def.	RossiHD	UD	3/3
JMX	def.	Coach Richard	UD	4/4
FaZe Sensei	def.	Overtflow	TKO	3/3
Michael Philippou	def.	Scarce	TKO	3/3
Halal Ham	def.	Jrizzy Jeremy	UD	3/3

== Recap and aftermath ==
After Jake Paul defeated Deji by technical knockout, he called out American singer-songwriter Chris Brown, saying "I know you were supposed to fight Soulja Boy. But I think it is time you got in the ring with someone your own size.” The fight was attended by multiple celebrities such as Jimi Manuwa.

=== Scorecard ===
Gareth Morris		Gino Piccinino		Delilah Ponce	
KSI	Paul	KSI	Paul	KSI	Paul
58	57	57	57	57	57

== Reception ==
=== Pre-match ===
The fight and the lead-up to it caught the attention of mainstream media as well as professional boxing promoter Eddie Hearn, and boxers such as Floyd Mayweather, Tyson Fury, Amir Khan and Ricky Hatton.

=== Viewership and revenue ===
The pre-fight promotional videos uploaded to the official KSI vs Logan YouTube channel have garnered over 63 million views, with the official fight trailers alone amassing over 30 million views. Additionally, the promotional diss track music videos from KSI, Logan Paul, Jake Paul, and Deji have accumulated nearly 110 million views.

The fight successfully sold-out 21,000 tickets for the Manchester Arena, a significant increase compared to the 8,000 tickets sold for the previous KSI vs Joe Weller fight at the Copper Box Arena. The fight generated an estimated live gate revenue of over £2.7 million ($3.5 million) from ticket sales.

In total, over 2.25 million viewers had watched the fight live, with an estimated 1.05 million tuning in via pay-per-view and 1.2 million watching illegal streams on Twitch. As of June 2023, the official KSI vs Logan YouTube channel has amassed over 122 million views.

==== Pay-per-view numbers ====
The fight sold 1.3 million PPV buys, when combining purchases on YouTube and the KSI vs Logan Paul official website. This includes over 800,000 live purchases, making it the largest non-professional amateur boxing match of all time. (Note: See Pay-per-view § List of pay-per-view bouts.)

== See also ==
- On Point (KSI song)
