= Abridgement =

Condensing or reduction of a book or other creative work into a shorter form

An abridgement (or abridgment) is a condensing or reduction of a book or other creative work into a shorter form while maintaining the unity of the source. The abridgement can be true to the original work in terms of mood and tone, capturing the parts the abridging author perceives to be most important; it could be a complete parody of the original or it could fall anywhere in between, generally capturing the tone and message of the original author but falling short in some manner or subtly twisting their words and message to favor a different interpretation or agenda.

A written work may be abridged to make it more accessible to a wider audience; for example, to make an adaptation of it as an audio book or a television show, to make a more convenient companion to an already-established work or to create a shorter reference version.

Unabridged is the opposite of abridged. A common example is an unabridged dictionary.

== Abridgement for audio ==
Abridgement is most often used to adapt a book or film into a narrated audio version. Because books written for adults are generally meant to be read silently to oneself, which is usually much faster than reading aloud, most books can take between 20 and 40 hours to read aloud. Because many audio book listeners are looking to listen to the information in a book more quickly and because of the high cost associated with recording and distributing 40 hours of audio, audio book versions of novels are often produced in an abridged version.

Some party, usually an editor for the book's publishing company, goes through the text of the book and removes elements, notations, references, narratives and sometimes entire scenes from a book that could be considered superfluous to the actual story or focus of the book in order to make its audible reading time shorter. A fully abridged audio book can span as little as 4 hours for a book that would span 20 hours unabridged.

The easiest content of a fiction book to edit out is back story that is often provided for characters or story elements that help support the reality of the story for the reader but fails to provide any narrative to the story itself. For example, a passage such as "John sped away in his automobile, a red 1967 Mustang he'd purchased from a junkyard and spent most of his college years restoring with his father" could be abridged to "John sped away in his automobile, a red 1967 Mustang" or, if context permits, simply "John sped away."

In a nonfiction piece, the most commonly abridged details are references, charts, details and facts that are used to support an author's claim. While it would be unprofessional or irresponsible to omit such details from a book, it is understandable for an audio book, as it is assumed the listener wants to hear the author's opinion, and the listener who needs to check the details may refer to the text.

Occasionally, an abridged audio book will be advertised as "abridgement approved by the author," which would imply that the original work's author has reviewed the trimmed down version of the work and agrees that the intention or narrative of the story has not been lost or that no vital information has been removed.

In many cases, an audio book for a popular title is available in both an abridged and unabridged version, but the abridged version often is released first and almost always costs significantly less than the unabridged version. Often, the two versions are produced independently of each other and may have different narrators. Unabridged versions of books are popular among those with poor eyesight or reading skills who wish to appreciate the entirety of the work, and the abridged version is more often preferred by those who want just a quick and entertaining way to follow the story.

On the radio (for example, in British Radio 4 programmes as Book of the Week, Book at Bedtime, and Go 4 It for children), books are almost always abridged and so if someone were trying to read along with the book, one would find it much more difficult than on an audio book.

== Abridgement for print ==
A shortened form of literary work in which the major themes of the original are kept occurs in books for faster and easier reading. The Signet Classics Abridged Works are notable examples of abridgment; the Signet Classics Bible, for example, is 40 percent shorter than the 850,000-word King James Version. Although well-known passages in abridged works are often left intact, editors may remove "repetition, rhetoric and redundancy" from a complete work.

Until roughly the mid-19th century, the act of abridgment was widely regarded as fair use and was among the most frequently abused loopholes in British and American copyright law. However, by the 1870s, international outcry from authors and publishers alike prompted legislatures to consider revisions to end the "very unreasonable" principle. Today, abridgments are considered a type of derivative work within the scope of the copyright owner's control. (Note: See e.g., 17 U.S.C. § 101: "A 'derivative work' is a work based upon one or more preexisting works, such as a[n]... abridgment, condensation, or any other form in which a work may be recast, transformed, or adapted.")

While increasingly uncommon, some books are published as abridged versions of earlier books, which is most common in textbooks, usually lengthy works in complicated fields like engineering or medicine. Abridged versions of popular textbooks are published to be used as study aids or to provide enough surface information for the reader to become familiar with the material but not have a full understanding of it or its full scope.

== Abridgement for television ==
Plays, notably by Shakespeare, have very often been heavily abridged for television to fit them into ninety-minute or two-hour time slots. (The same is true of long classical ballets such as the two-and-a-half hour Sleeping Beauty, which has almost never been performed complete on television.) It was done more often in the past than it is now (such as in Hallmark Hall of Fame from the 1950s to about 1970). With the advent of such noncommercially-sponsored PBS anthologies such as Great Performances, Live from Lincoln Center and the BBC Television Shakespeare plays, there is now less pressure to cram a play lasting at least three hours, such as Hamlet, into a two-hour time slot.

== "Abridged series" ==
An "abridged series" is a fanmade parody that uses video footage from a television series—oftentimes Japanese animation—which is usually filled with comedic redubbing. They are called "abridged" series because episodes are usually not as long as the original episodes or tend to shorten events to meld two or more episodes together, making them a comedic summation of events. The first abridged series, Yu-Gi-Oh!: The Abridged Series, was created by Bea Billany, better known by her screen name LittleKuriboh, in 2006. It has since inspired multiple popular abridged series such as Friendship Is Witchcraft, Dragon Ball Z Abridged by TeamFourStar, and Sword Art Online Abridged by Something Witty Entertainment. Since most abridged series are uploaded to YouTube, they are occasionally subject to copyright takedowns by parent companies.
