= Logan Paul =

American influencer and professional wrestler (born 1995)

- Paul in 2026
- Born: Logan Alexander Paul; April 1, 1995 (age 31); Westlake, Ohio, U.S.
- Occupations: Online personality; influencer; singer; actor; professional wrestler
- Spouse: Nina Agdal (m. 2025)
- Children: 1
- Relatives: Jake Paul (brother)

YouTube information
- Channels: Logan Paul; Impaulsive
- Genres: Comedy; vlog
- Subscribers: 23.6 million
- Views: 6.2 billion
- Professional wrestling career
- Billed height: 6 ft 2 in (188 cm)
- Billed weight: 220 lb (100 kg)
- Billed from: Dorado Beach, Puerto Rico, by way of Cleveland, Ohio
- Trained by: WWE Performance Center; Drew Gulak; Shane Helms; Shawn Michaels
- Debut: April 2, 2021
- Last updated: August 14, 2026

Logan Alexander Paul (born April 1, 1995) is an American influencer, professional wrestler, entrepreneur, boxer, singer and actor. He has over 23 million subscribers on his YouTube channel Logan Paul Vlogs and has ranked on the Forbes list for the highest-paid YouTube creators in 2017, 2018, and 2021. He is the co-founder of beverage company Prime and snack brand Lunchly. Paul has also run the Impaulsive podcast since November 2018, which has over four million YouTube subscribers. In December 2025, Paul was appointed General Partner of the venture capital firm Anti Fund, which was co-founded by his brother Jake Paul. As a wrestler, he has been signed to WWE since June 2022, where he performs on the Raw brand and is a member of The Vision stable. He is a former one-time WWE United States Champion and one-time World Tag Team Champion.

In 2013, Paul gained a following by posting sketches on the now-defunct video-sharing application Vine. He registered his first YouTube channel, TheOfficialLoganPaul, on October 18, 2013, where he started posting regularly following the closure of the Vine app. He later created the Logan Paul Vlogs channel on August 29, 2015, which has since become his most-subscribed YouTube channel. As of August 2023, the channel has received 23.6 million subscribers and almost 6 billion views.

As an actor, Paul's television and film work includes guest appearances on Law & Order: Special Victims Unit and Bizaardvark, and roles in films The Thinning (2016) and The Thinning: New World Order (2018). He has also explored other avenues; he released his debut single "2016" in 2016, and fought English media personality KSI in a white-collar boxing match in 2018. The bout ended in a majority draw. In the 2019 rematch, which was a professional bout, KSI won by split decision. In 2023, Paul won his first professional boxing match when he defeated Dillon Danis via disqualification. Paul also transitioned to exhibition boxing in 2021, fighting Floyd Mayweather Jr. in a non-scored bout. After a couple of brief appearances in WWE in 2021, he made his professional wrestling debut as The Miz's tag team partner in a tag team match at WrestleMania 38 in April 2022, which they won and Paul received praise for his performance. He then signed a contract with WWE in June that year and later won the WWE United States Championship in November 2023 and the World Tag Team Championship in March 2026.

Paul has been involved in several controversies, most notably in relation to a trip to Japan in December 2017, during which he visited the Aokigahara forest (a notorious suicide site), filmed himself finding the corpse of a suicide victim, and uploaded the footage to his YouTube channel. Others include his promotion of scams and failed ventures, including CryptoZoo—in which he failed to compensate more than $1.5 million to investors despite promising to do so.

== Early life ==
Logan Alexander Paul was born on April 1, 1995, in Westlake, Ohio, a suburb of Cleveland. His mother is Pamela Ann Stepnick (née Meredith) and his father Gregory Allan Paul is a realtor. He claims Irish, Welsh, Jewish, French and German ancestry. He was raised in Westlake with his younger brother Jake (born 1997), who is also a media personality. Paul began creating videos for a YouTube channel called Zoosh when he was 10 years old. He attended Westlake High School, being named The Plain Dealer's All-Star football linebacker in 2012, and qualifying for the state-level Ohio High School Athletic Association 2013 Division I Wrestling Individual Championships.

== YouTube career ==
=== 2015–2017: YouTube beginnings ===
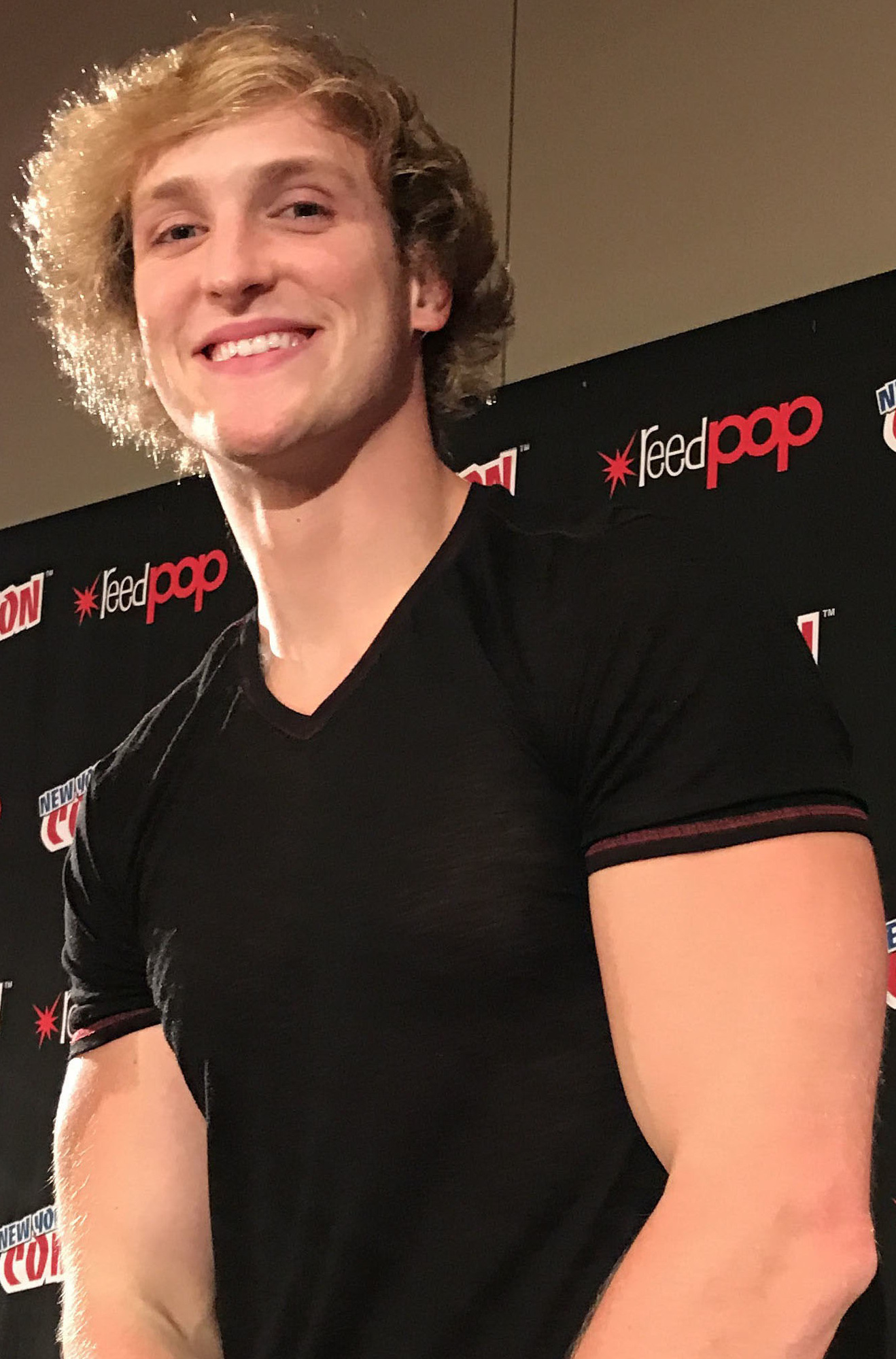
Paul in 2016

By the time Paul began attending college, his YouTube channel had attained a modest following via the platform Vine. He took classes in industrial engineering at Ohio University before dropping out in 2014 to pursue a career as a full-time social media entertainer in Los Angeles, moving into an apartment complex in the city with other Vine stars.

Paul rose to fame as a member on the Internet video sharing service Vine. In February 2014, he had over 3.1 million followers on various social media platforms. By April 2014, he had attained 105,000 Twitter followers, 361,000 Instagram followers, 31,000 likes on his Facebook page and about 150,000 subscribers to his YouTube channel. A YouTube compilation video of his Vine work garnered more than four million views the first week it was posted. In 2015 he was ranked as the 10th most influential figure on Vine, with his six-second videos earning him hundreds of thousands of dollars in advertising revenue. By that October, his Facebook videos alone had more than 300 million views. Logan refers to his following as the "Logang", a portmanteau of "Logan" and "gang".

His YouTube channel was known for his vlogs about his daily life which included pranks, comedy, controversy and drama. In 2017, Paul was estimated by Forbes magazine to be the fourth-highest paid YouTuber, earning at least $12.5m (£9.3m). He also earned a significant amount from his Maverick clothing line. In 2018, Paul estimated that at one point he was documenting 90 per cent of his life on the internet.

=== 2017–2018: Suicide forest controversy ===
On December 31, 2017, Paul uploaded a vlog to his YouTube channel depicting the corpse of a recently-deceased man who had died by hanging himself in Aokigahara at the base of Mount Fuji in Japan, known as the "suicide forest" due to its infamy as a suicide site. Initially intended to be part three of his "Tokyo Adventures" series, Paul and his group had planned to camp in the woods, but in response to finding the corpse, decided to notify the authorities and cancel their plans. The video gained 6.3 million views within 24 hours of being uploaded. Paul's video depicting the corpse, whose face was censored, and his group's reactions to it, were criticized by celebrities and politicians. In addition, he was accused by other members of the YouTube community of being insensitive to suicide victims. He was also criticized for other misbehavior he was captured taking part in during the trip, including climbing onto a moving forklift truck at the Tsukiji fish market, removing his clothing on a crowded street and then proceeding to fight with one of his traveling companions, and throwing a giant Poké Ball plush toy at passing citizens, including an officer of the Tokyo Metropolitan Police Department. Several petitions were posted to Change.org urging YouTube to delete Paul's channel in light of the controversy, the largest of which received more than 720,000 signatures as of February 9, 2018. As a result of the backlash, Paul removed the video from his YouTube channel, following up with a written apology on Twitter on January 1, 2018. The following day, on January 2, a subsequent video apology was released to YouTube in which Paul admitted to making "a severe and continuous lapse in [his] judgement" and described his behavior as a "coping mechanism", asking his fans to stop defending his actions in the process. On January 9, YouTube issued a statement via Twitter condemning Paul's video: "It's taken us a long time to respond, but we've been listening to everything you've been saying. We know that the actions of one creator can affect the entire community, so we'll have more to share soon on steps we're taking to ensure a video like this is never circulated again." On January 10, YouTube announced it was removing Paul's channels from Google Preferred, its preferred ad program, and New World Order, the sequel to his YouTube film The Thinning, was placed on hold, with the airing of Logan Paul VS. being halted as well. He was also cut from season 4 of the YouTube Red series Foursome and the role of Alec Fixler was terminated.

Metro-Goldwyn-Mayer postponed the release of the film Valley Girl, featuring Paul, following the controversies. On January 15, Paul was seen at LAX by reporters from TMZ. He said that he has learned a lot from his mistakes and believes he has been treated "fairly". When asked whether he deserves a second chance, Paul replied, "Everyone deserves second chances, bro." In response, he donated $1 million to suicide prevention agencies, a quarter of which is going to the National Suicide Prevention Lifeline. In response to the controversy, Paul hired Mike Majlak, a former marketing manager at furniture company LoveSac, to "make sure that no bad things happen" and work with Logan to help improve his reputation. On February 4, Paul officially returned to his daily vlogs on YouTube after taking a 3-week-long hiatus. YouTube CEO Susan Wojcicki said on February 12 that Paul did not violate YouTube's three-strike policy and did not meet the criteria for being banned from the platform. In the wake of the controversy regarding the suicide video, Maverick Apparel, a brand for juniors and children, threatened Paul with legal action for giving his clothing line a similar name ("Maverick by Logan Paul"), believing shoppers are confusing their line with Paul's, resulting in a deep decline in sales.

=== 2018–present: podcast, and further controversies ===
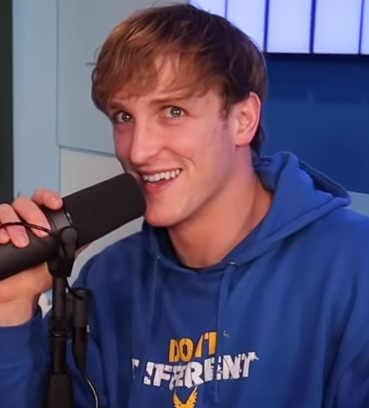
Paul in 2018

On February 9, 2018, YouTube suspended all advertising on Paul's channels due to his "pattern of behavior", referring to a joke he tweeted about the Tide Pod challenge, removing a fish from his pond to "jokingly give it CPR", and tasering two dead rats. His revenue was temporarily halted as a result, and as a result of the suspension, he broadcast live on Twitch for the first time. Two weeks later, on February 26, YouTube restored ads on Paul's channel; however, his channel was still on a 90-day "probation period" during which time content from his channel was not eligible to be on YouTube's trending tab.

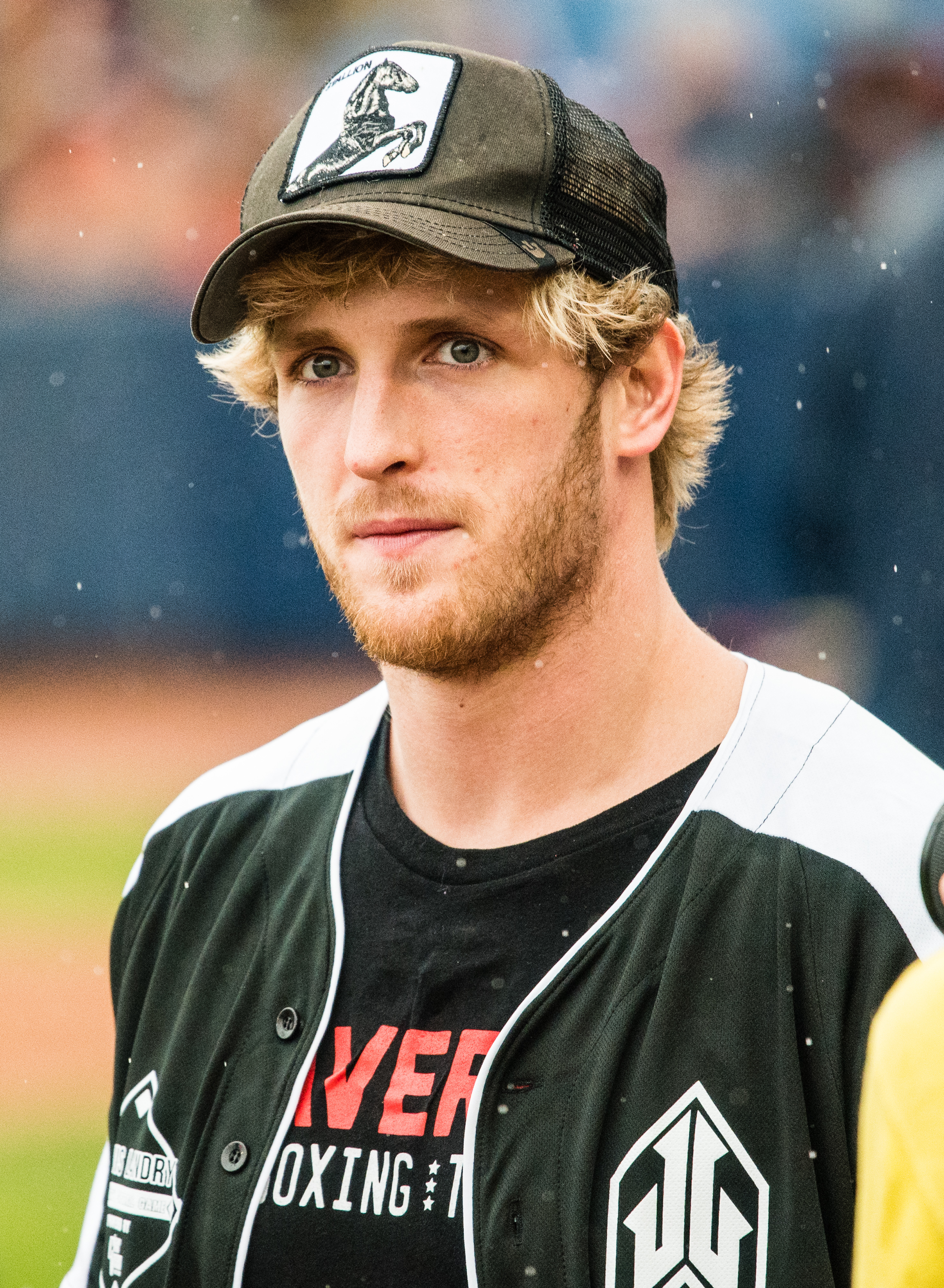
Paul in 2019

On November 20, 2018, the first episode of Paul's Impaulsive podcast was aired. In January 2019, Paul remarked on the podcast, "What is it, male-only March? We're gonna attempt to go gay for just one month." He received widespread criticism for implying that being gay is a choice, with LGBTQ+ organization GLAAD responding to Paul's statement on Twitter, writing, "That's not how it works, Logan Paul." In March 2019, Paul released what has been described as a mockumentary exploring the Flat Earth Theory. In the video, he interviewed many self-proclaimed "Flat Earthers", and spoke at the 2018 Flat Earth International Conference, which took place in Denver, Colorado. Logan Paul was sued by Planeless Pictures in December 2020 for the aforementioned 2017 incident in Aokigahara, when he posted a video including a recently deceased suicide victim. Planeless Pictures accused him of posting the video to escape a movie deal he had with them where he would star in, write, and produce their film Airplane Mode. They also claimed that the video led to Google suspending their contract with them, leaving them $3 million in debt.

In September 2021, Paul released an NFT-based game called CryptoZoo, which was mocked for using stock images and was poorly received. In December 2022, YouTuber Coffeezilla released a docuseries exposing the game's lack of functionality despite substantial funding. Criticisms included marketing towards children and pre-launch cryptocurrency purchases by the team. Paul disputed these allegations, threatened legal action against Coffeezilla, and later deleted his response video. In January 2023, Paul apologized and promised a $1.3 million refund for NFT holders. By February 2023, Paul faced a class-action lawsuit from investors. A refund program began in January 2024, where Paul offered refunds to those agreeing not to sue, and he also filed a counter-claim against co-defendants. In June 2024, Paul decided to sue Coffeezilla for defamation, despite his earlier apologies. Coffeezilla responded that the lawsuit was filed in response to him asking Paul for a new investigation into Liquid Marketplace, a company co-owned by Paul and being accused of multi-layered fraud by Canadian authorities.

Paul was criticized in January 2023 when his former pet pig, named "Pearl", was found abandoned by The Gentle Barn Sanctuary in California, USA. Rescuers said she was "lucky to be alive" after being diagnosed with a potentially life-threatening uterus infection, which they said has since healed. Despite facing online criticism, Paul denied any wrongdoing, stating that he responsibly re-homed the pig in 2021 when he moved to Puerto Rico, and that the pig was subsequently re-homed again unbeknownst to him at a later date. In August 2024, the BBC, wanting to cover Paul's cryptocurrency controversies, was asked to fly into Puerto Rico in the middle of Hurricane Ernesto, and instead of Paul turning up at his gym for the interview, a lookalike came instead. This was followed by a crowd which shouted abuse at the BBC. The BBC then received a letter from Paul's lawyer, who warned the BBC not to publish what they had found.

Leading up to the 2024 presidential election, then-former president Donald Trump appeared on the Impaulsive podcast for a 45-minute interview with Paul.

== Music career ==
On May 18, 2017, Paul released "Help Me Help You", a single featuring the boy band Why Don't We. The song became popular on YouTube and has since accumulated more than 79 million streams on Spotify.

In June 2017, Paul criticized his brother Jake Paul's diss track "It's Everyday Bro", causing Jake to release "Logang Sucks", directed at Logan. In response, Logan released "The Fall of Jake Paul", also featuring Why Don't We, insulting his brother for being less financially successful. The video received over 195 million views. The brothers eventually reconciled, and released the songs "I Love You Bro" and "The Rise of the Pauls".

On November 23, 2017, Paul released his new single, "No Handlebars", a track that draws heavily on an interpolated sample of the song "Handlebars" by the American alternative hip hop group Flobots. The song was heavily criticized for its perceived sexual objectification of women, including a scene in its music video where Paul rides several women like a bicycle. Flobots frontman Jamie Laurie lambasted Paul for both the "sexist" lyrical content of the song and for unauthorized use of the sample, calling him the face of "douchebag entitlement". Laurie would later go on to release a track with lyrics deriding Paul, titled "Handle Your Bars". Paul did not respond to Laurie's comments nor the backlash towards "No Handlebars". After Flobots sued Paul for copyright infringement in 2019, he deleted the song from YouTube.

== Acting career ==
In early 2015, Paul appeared on Law & Order: Special Victims Unit. He also appeared on the Fox TV series Weird Loners, where he appeared in the role of the Paul Twins. He starred in two episodes of the Freeform series Stitchers. In 2016, he starred in the YouTube Red movie The Thinning opposite Peyton List. In early 2016, Paul trained with drama coaches and the comedy troupes The Groundlings and Upright Citizens Brigade. Paul wrote the screenplay for an adult comedy, Airplane Mode, which has been described as "American Pie for Gen Z", and by Paul himself as "Expendables with Internet stars". The film was originally planned to be released in 2017, but was eventually released on August 2, 2019, after being delayed. He was also involved in a number of advertising campaigns, including for Hanes, PepsiCo, and HBO. In 2016, Comcast purchased a short form digital TV series from Paul called Logan Paul VS.

In February 2017, Dwayne Johnson released a YouTube video entitled "Logan Paul has been cut from, like, all of The Rock's movies", in which he informs Paul that he has been cut from all of Johnson's films, and subsequently consoles him by making him the "ambassador" to his upcoming Baywatch feature film.

In 2021, Paul competed on the fifth season of The Masked Singer as "Grandpa Monster". He was unmasked after his second appearance where one of his clues was a foreshadowing of his boxing match against Floyd Mayweather Jr.

== Boxing career ==
=== Paul vs KSI ===
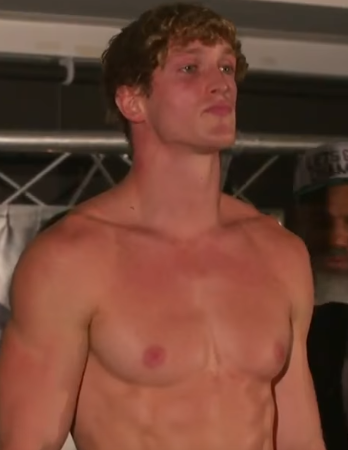
Paul during his official weigh-in for the KSI vs. Logan Paul fight in 2018

On February 3, 2018, following his white collar amateur boxing match with Joe Weller, British YouTuber KSI challenged Paul to a boxing match. On February 24, 2018, it was announced that Paul and his brother would be fighting KSI and his younger brother, Deji, in two white-collar boxing matches. The fight ended as a majority draw, with two judges scoring the fight even at 57–57 and a third judge scoring 58–57 in favor of KSI.

=== Paul vs. KSI II ===
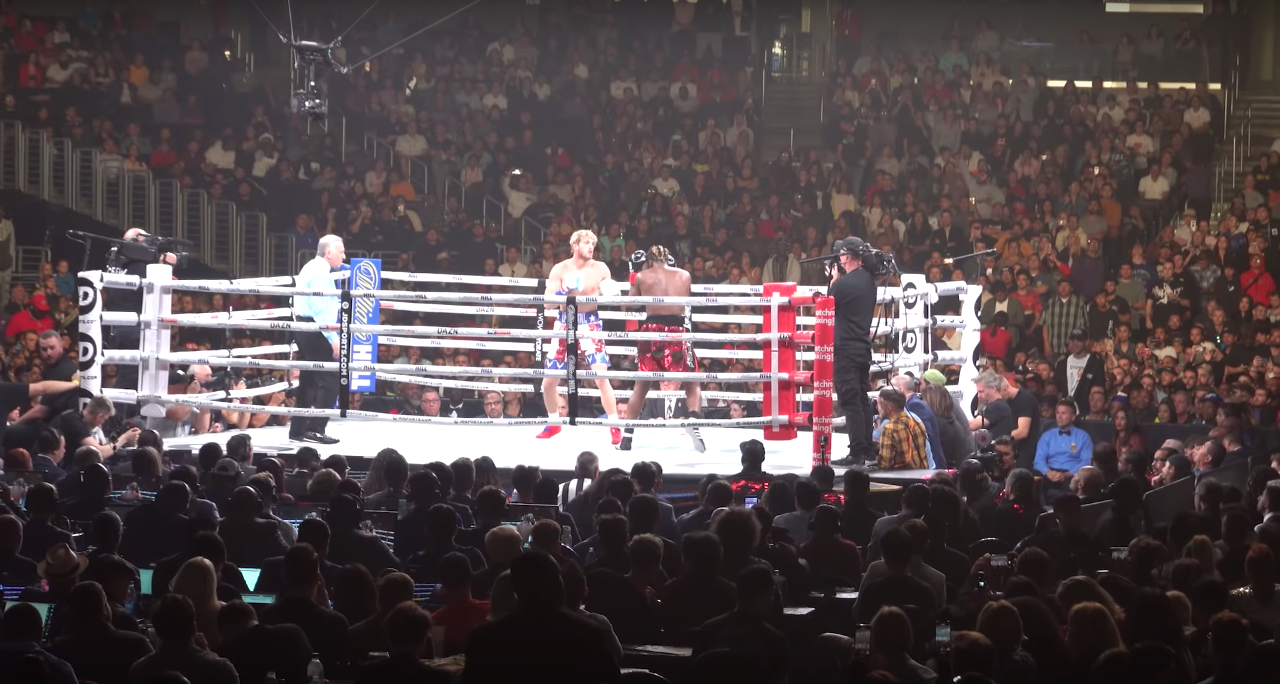
Paul (left) in the ring in his rematch against KSI

On September 4, 2019, it was announced that Paul would be making his professional boxing debut in a rematch against KSI, which would be broadcast exclusively on DAZN in the United States. The fight was scheduled to take place on November 9 at the Staples Center. At the UK press conference for the rematch, Paul again stirred controversy as he accused KSI of having five abortions, before remarking, "Five babies dead. I might return the favor and kill you." He received criticism from abortion rights activists, who described his comment as "horrific", while anti-abortion activists came to his defense. Paul responded by stating, "I said something distasteful and insensitive."

The rematch, which consisted of six three-minute rounds, resulted in a win for KSI via split decision, with two judges scoring the fight 57–54 and 56–55 for KSI, and one judge scoring it 56–55 in favor of Paul.

=== Exhibition bout with Floyd Mayweather Jr. ===
On December 6, 2020, it was announced that Paul would face former five-division world champion Floyd Mayweather Jr. in an exhibition bout on February 20, 2021. The fight was postponed, and took place on June 6, 2021, at Hard Rock Stadium in Miami Gardens, Florida. On May 6, 2021, Mayweather and Paul met for the first time at a press conference at Hard Rock Stadium, where the latter's brother, Jake Paul, became involved in an angry brawl with Mayweather when he removed Mayweather's hat from his head. A visibly irate Mayweather was captured on video saying, "I'll kill you motherfucker! Are you crazy? I'll fuck you up, motherfucker. I don't play motherfucking games. I'll fuck you up."

The bout consisted of constant clinching initiated by Paul and went the full distance to the sound of boos from the crowd, with no winner being announced. Mayweather's superior boxing was reflected by the CompuBox punch stats, with Mayweather having landed 43 punches of 107 thrown (40.2%), compared to Paul's 28 landed of 217 thrown (12.9%).

In his post-fight interview, Mayweather praised his opponent, saying: "He's better than I thought he was ... he's a tough, rough competitor." Paul appeared to harbor some doubt about how seriously Mayweather had taken the fight, saying: "I'm going to go home thinking, 'Did Floyd let me survive?'" Mayweather later stated that he did hold back saying "If it was a real fight, it would've been a blowout in the first round."

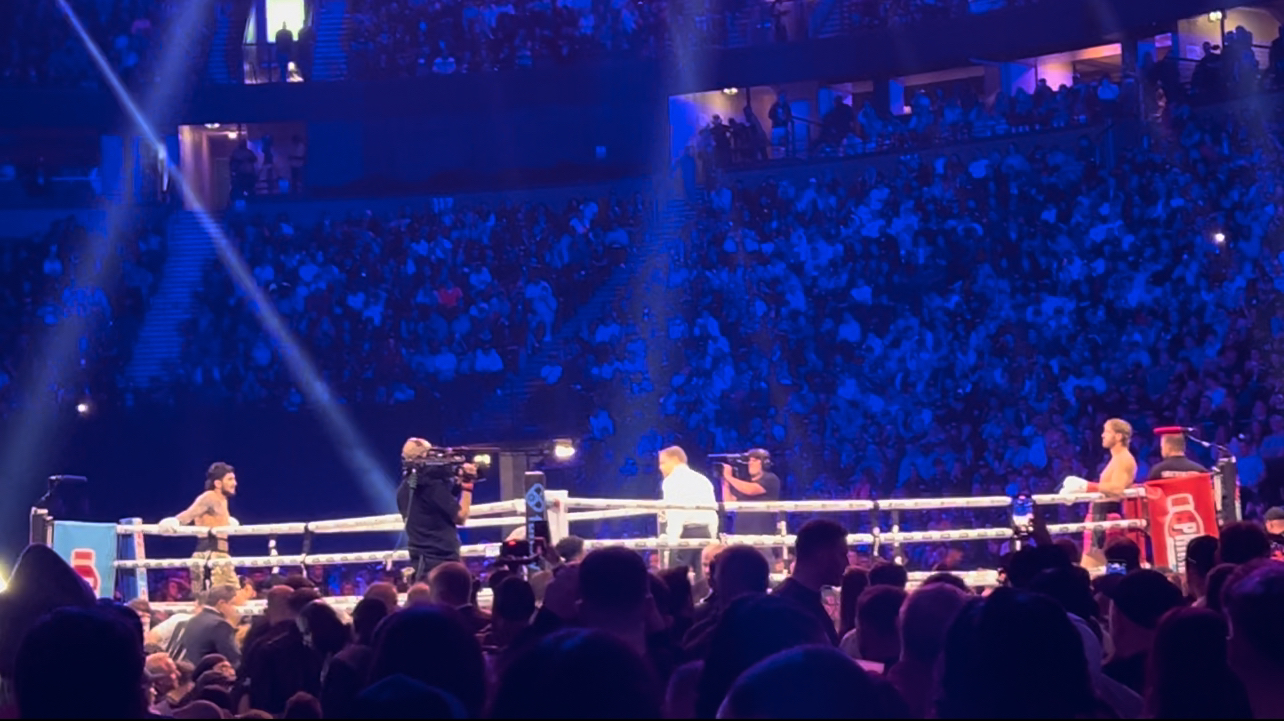
Paul and Danis moments before the start of their bout

=== Paul vs Danis ===
On July 28, 2023, it was announced that Paul and KSI would both headline MF & DAZN: X Series 10 – The Prime Card on October 14 at Manchester Arena in Manchester, England. On 31 July, it was announced that KSI would face professional boxer Tommy Fury; on August 8, it was announced that Paul would face American mixed martial artist Dillon Danis.

Danis repeatedly shared pictures of Paul's fiancée Nina Agdal with other men and sometimes partially or fully nude during the build-up to the fight, and he was served with a lawsuit as a result. The bout ended in the sixth round when Danis attempted a takedown and an illegal choke. Several members of security entered the ring and a brawl broke out, resulting in Danis being disqualified and Paul was declared the winner.

== Professional wrestling career ==
=== WWE ===
==== Early beginnings (2021–2023) ====
On the April 2, 2021 episode of SmackDown, Paul made his WWE debut as a guest of Sami Zayn for his red carpet premiere of his documentary, with Zayn later inviting Paul to be at ringside for his match at WrestleMania 37 against Kevin Owens. On Night 2 of WrestleMania 37, after Owens defeated Zayn, Paul celebrated with Owens before being hit with the Stunner by Owens. On the September 3 episode of SmackDown, Paul made his return as Happy Corbin's special guest on '"The KO Show'", where Paul helped Corbin attack Owens, establishing himself as a heel.

On April 2, 2022, on Night 1 of WrestleMania 38, Paul made his in-ring debut, teaming with The Miz to defeat The Mysterios (composed of Rey and Dominik Mysterio). After the match, Miz attacked Paul, turning the latter face. On June 30, 2022, Paul signed a multi-event contract with WWE. Following this, Paul wanted to avenge the attack from Miz at WrestleMania 38 and subsequently defeated him at SummerSlam. Paul then challenged Roman Reigns on the September 16 episode of SmackDown, and the two faced each other at Crown Jewel for Reigns' Undisputed WWE Universal Championship. Paul was unsuccessful in defeating Reigns, despite interference from his Impaulsive entourage and his brother Jake. The match against Reigns received universal acclaim, with critics highly praising Paul's wrestling skills. It was initially reported that Paul had suffered a torn meniscus, MCL, and ACL during the match, however, it was later revealed that Paul had only sprained his meniscus and MCL.

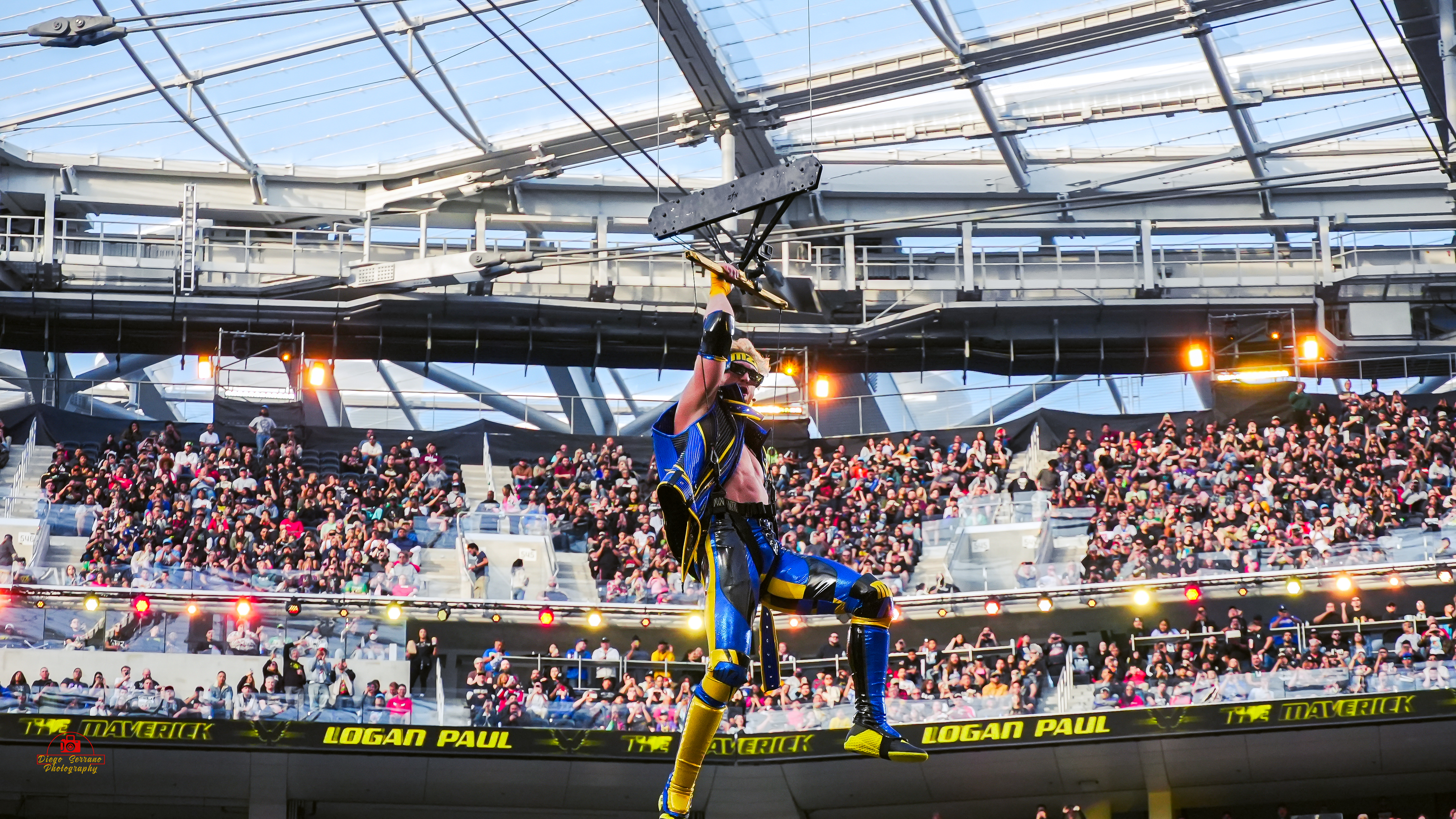
Paul making his entrance on a zipline at WrestleMania 39.

On January 28, 2023, Paul made his return from injury at the Royal Rumble in the Royal Rumble match at No. 29. During the match, Paul had an encounter with Ricochet that led to both men leaping off the top rope from both sides of the ring, and colliding with each other mid-air. The spot garnered a massive crowd and social media reaction, with many deeming it one of the best moments of the match. He would go on to eliminate Seth "Freakin" Rollins before being eliminated by the eventual winner Cody Rhodes. At Elimination Chamber on February 18, Paul snuck into the Elimination Chamber match and cost Rollins the United States Championship, thus turning heel. On Night 1 of WrestleMania 39, Paul lost to Rollins; the match also saw an appearance from Paul's Prime co-owner KSI, who was dressed as a Prime bottle. Like his match against Reigns the year prior, the match received high praise from critics, and initially, it was the final match of Paul's initial contract. However, a week later, Paul signed a new multi-year contract with WWE. The new contract would see more involvement and appearances from Paul with Paul himself stating he wanted to win a championship. In the 2023 WWE Draft in late April–early May, Paul was deemed a free agent, allowing him to appear on both Raw and SmackDown. Paul then made his first appearance since Night 1 of WrestleMania 39 on the June 19, 2023, episode of Raw, where he announced that he had been added to the men's Money in the Bank ladder match, which took place at the namesake event. During the match, in which Paul was unsuccessful at winning, Paul and Ricochet would botch a Spanish fly from the top rope. This led to a match at SummerSlam, where Paul defeated Ricochet after using brass knuckles.

==== United States Champion (2023–2024) ====
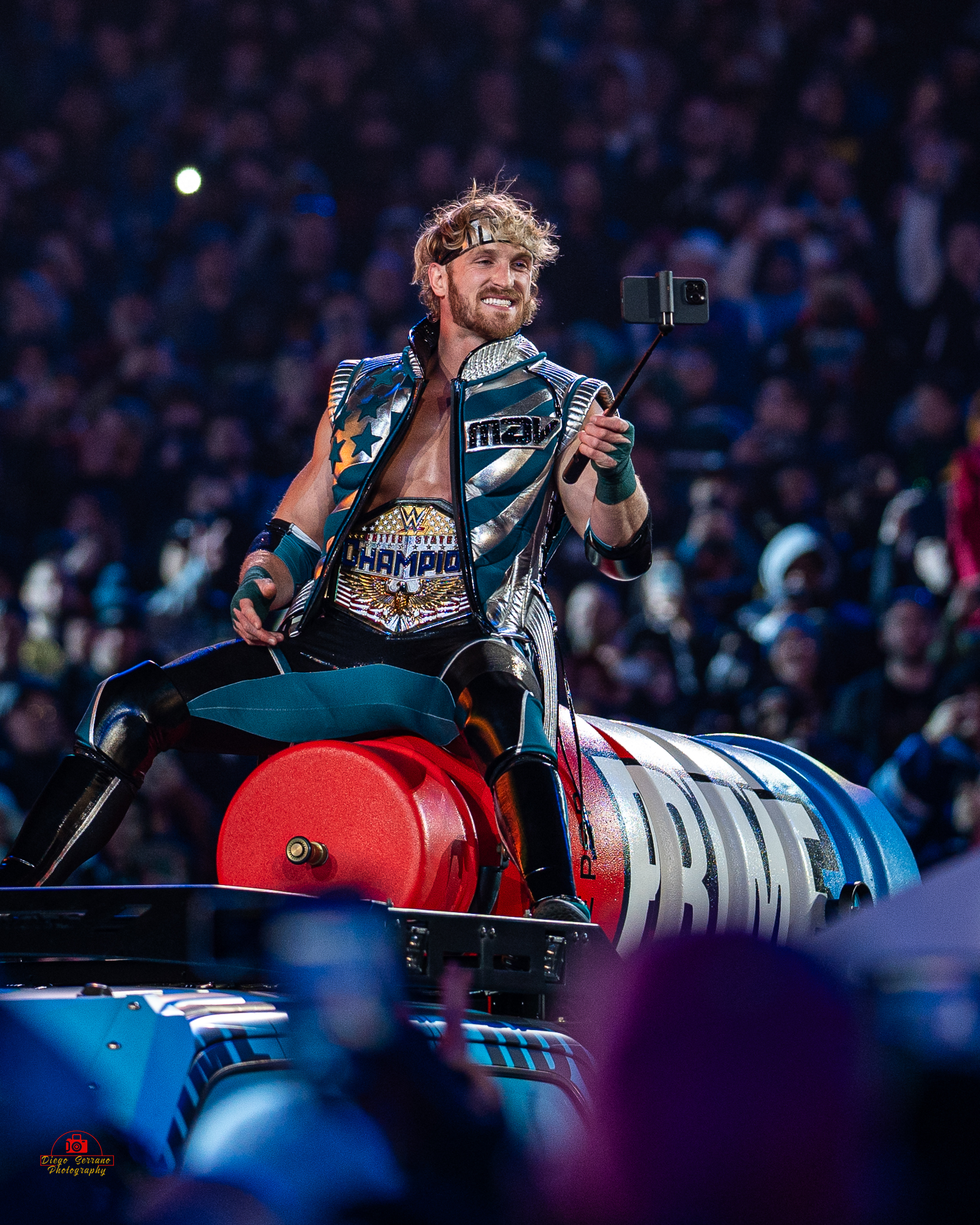
Paul making his entrance as the WWE United States Champion at WrestleMania XL.

On October 14, 2023, after defeating Dillon Danis in a boxing match at MF & DAZN: X Series 10 – The Prime Card, Paul called out United States Champion Rey Mysterio. After Mysterio accepted Paul's challenge for a title match at Crown Jewel, Paul won the United States Championship at Crown Jewel, after using brass knuckles on Mysterio, thus winning his first professional wrestling championship. Paul made his first appearance as champion on the December 1 episode of SmackDown, where he announced a tournament to determine his first challenger at the Royal Rumble, which was won by Kevin Owens. During the match at the Royal Rumble on January 27, 2024, Austin Theory and Grayson Waller gave Paul brass knuckles to use on Owens, only for Owens to use them on Paul instead. However, the referee caught Owens with the brass knuckles in his hand, giving Paul the victory by disqualification to retain the title. On the February 16 episode of SmackDown, Paul defeated The Miz in his first televised match in WWE to qualify for the men's Elimination Chamber match at Elimination Chamber: Perth. At the event, he was eliminated by Randy Orton but later returned to hit him with brass knuckles, costing him the match. On Night 2 of WrestleMania XL, Paul successfully defended the United States Championship against Kevin Owens and Randy Orton in a triple threat match after an assist by IShowSpeed.

On the May 10 episode of SmackDown, SmackDown general manager Nick Aldis announced that Paul would be the next opponent against Undisputed WWE Champion Cody Rhodes and a Champion vs. Champion match was scheduled for King and Queen of the Ring. On the following episode, during the contract signing for the match, the contract stated that the match would be for both titles. However, when Paul was about to sign the contract, he tore it up, before bringing out his own contract, which stated that only Rhodes' title would be on the line. After Paul mocked Rhodes, he signed the contract, confirming that the match would only be for Rhodes' title. At the event on May 25, Paul failed to win the title from Rhodes after interference from special guest ring announcer Ibrahim Al Hajjaj. At SummerSlam on August 3, Paul lost the title to LA Knight, ending his reign at 273 days.

==== Championship pursuits (2024–2025) ====
On December 18, as part of a special kickoff stream celebrating WWE's streaming launch with Netflix, Paul was announced as joining the Raw brand, where he expressed desire in becoming a WWE Champion. On February 1, 2025, at Royal Rumble, Paul entered the namesake match as the 30th entrant, eliminating AJ Styles and CM Punk before getting eliminated by John Cena. On the February 10 episode of Raw, Paul defeated Rey Mysterio to qualify for the men's Elimination Chamber match at Elimination Chamber: Toronto. At the event, he was eliminated by Punk. On Night 2 of WrestleMania 41, Paul defeated Styles. On May 24 at Saturday Night's Main Event XXXIX, Paul unsuccessfully challenged Jey Uso for the World Heavyweight Championship. On June 7 at Money in the Bank, Paul teamed with Cena, losing to Uso and Cody Rhodes. After Money in the Bank, Paul formed an alliance with Drew McIntyre, teaming with him on Night 1 of SummerSlam on August 2 to defeat Randy Orton and Jelly Roll in a tag team match. On August 31 at Clash in Paris, Paul lost to Cena.

==== The Vision (2025–present) ====
On the November 3, 2025 episode of Raw, Paul confronted new World Heavyweight Champion CM Punk before being caught in a brawl involving The Vision (Bron Breakker and Bronson Reed). Later that night, Punk and Jey Uso faced Breakker and Reed in a match that ended in a double count-out. After the bout, The Vision attacked Uso. Paul then returned to the ring appearing to assist Punk, but instead struck Punk with his brass knuckles and handed them to Paul Heyman, revealing his alignment with the group. On November 29, Paul's team was victorious in the men's WarGames match at Survivor Series: WarGames. On the following episode of Raw, Paul officially joined The Vision.

At the Royal Rumble on January 31, 2026, Paul entered the match at No. 20 being eliminated by eventual winner Roman Reigns. On the February 27 episode of SmackDown, Paul replaced Jey Uso by defeating Jacob Fatu after interference from Drew McIntyre to qualify for the Elimination Chamber match the following night. At Elimination Chamber On February 28, Paul eliminated Je'Von Evans, LA Knight and Trick Williams before being eliminated by Cody Rhodes after interference from a returning Seth Rollins who delivered a Stomp allowing Paul to be eliminated by Rhodes. On the March 30 episode of Raw, The Vision (Paul and Austin Theory) defeated The Usos (Jey Uso and Jimmy Uso) in a Street Fight to win the World Tag Team Championship after interference from IShowSpeed. On Night 1 of WrestleMania 42 on April 18, Paul and Theory teamed with IShowSpeed in a losing effort against LA Knight and The Usos ending their feud. Following the match, Paul attacked IShowSpeed, after which Speed performed a top-rope splash onto Paul through a broadcast table with assistance from Knight and The Usos. At Saturday Night's Main Event XLIV on May 23, Paul and Theory succuessfully defended their titles against The Street Profits (Angelo Dawkins and Montez Ford). During the match, however, Paul legitimately suffered a torn tricep which required surgery, putting him out of action for up to six months. Breakker defended the title in his behalf during Paul's absence.

== Personal life ==
In October 2015, Paul lived in the same apartment complex on Hollywood and Vine in Hollywood, California as other social media celebrities including Amanda Cerny, Juanpa Zurita, and Andrew Bachelor, with his roommates Mark Dohner and Evan Eckenrode. This proximity facilitated various collaborations on their respective videos. In October 2017, Paul and Eckenrode relocated to an estate in Encino, California. In February 2021, Paul announced that he would be moving to Dorado, Puerto Rico from Los Angeles. He stated that the high taxes in California were the main motivator for the move. As of June 2021, he was renting a $13 million mansion there for $55,000 a month.

In February 2026, after his brother Jake posted on X a critical post of Bad Bunny and his Super Bowl Halftime show, Paul quote tweeted the post, disagreeing with his brother's criticism of Puerto Rico and Bad Bunny.

=== Relationships ===
From 2016 to early 2017, Paul dated influencer Amanda Cerny. He then had an on and off relationship with actress Chloe Bennet, with whom he was photographed making out in Hawaii on a break from filming their movie, Valley Girl, in July 2017. The two officially broke up in October 2018. Paul and Josie Canseco started dating in January 2020 and broke up in November 2020. Besides, Logan was romantically linked with America's Next Top Model contestant Jessica Serfaty in 2015, influencer Alissa Violet in 2017, actress and model Olga Safari from late 2017 to early 2018, and actress Corinna Kopf in 2019.

Paul began a relationship with Danish model Nina Agdal in 2022. They announced their engagement on July 9, 2023. On April 15, 2024, Paul revealed that he and Agdal were expecting their first child, a daughter born in September 2024. They were married on August 15, 2025, in Lake Como, Italy, the location of their engagement.

=== Health ===
Paul said in an episode of Impaulsive that he tore the cartilage in his knee playing football, requiring him to stay out of school for 3 months. In February 2019, Paul said that he has long-term brain damage, which he sustained from playing high school football. He stated that Daniel Amen, the doctor who diagnosed him, says it affects his ability to have empathy and a human connection with others. When filming a video for his Vine channel in 2014, Paul attempted a stunt during which he landed on a chair and damaged his right testicle.

== Boxing record ==
=== Professional ===
1 fight	0 wins	1 loss
By decision	0	1

No.	Result	Record	Opponent	Type	Round, time	Date	Location	Notes
1	Loss	0–1	KSI	SD	6	Nov 9, 2019	Staples Center, Los Angeles, California	

=== MF–Professional ===
1 fight	1 win	0 losses
By disqualification	1	0

No.	Result	Record	Opponent	Type	Round, time	Date	Location	Notes
1	Win	1–0	Dillon Danis	DQ	6 (6), 2:55	Oct 14, 2023	Manchester Arena, Manchester, England	

=== Exhibition ===
1 fight	0 wins	0 losses
Non-scored	1	

No.	Result	Record	Opponent	Type	Round, time	Date	Location	Notes
1	—N/a	0–0 (1)	Floyd Mayweather Jr.	—N/a	8	Jun 6, 2021	Hard Rock Stadium, Miami, Florida, U.S.	Non-scored bout

=== Amateur ===
1 fight	0 wins	0 losses
Draws	1	

No.	Result	Record	Opponent	Type	Round, time	Date	Location	Notes
1	Draw	0–0–1	KSI	MD	6	Aug 25, 2018	Manchester Arena, Manchester, England	

== Pay-per-view bouts ==
United States
No.	Date	Fight	Billing	Network	Buys	Revenue	Source(s)
1	November 9, 2019	KSI vs. Paul II	—N/a	DAZN	1,784,000	—N/a	
2	June 6, 2021	Mayweather vs. Paul	Bragging Rights	Showtime	1,000,000	$50,000,000	
Total					2,784,000	$50,000,000	

United Kingdom
No.	Date	Fight	Billing	Network	Buys	Revenue	Source(s)
1	August 25, 2018	KSI vs Paul	—N/a	YouTube	1,300,000	£13,000,000	
2	October 14, 2023	Paul vs Danis	Judgement Day	DAZN	1,300,000	£26,000,000	
Total					2,816,000	£41,160,000	

== Filmography ==
=== Film ===
Year	Film	Role	Notes	Ref.
2016	The Thinning	Blake Redding	YouTube Premium exclusive	
2017	The Space Between Us	Roger		
2017	Can't Take It Back	Clint Plotkin		
2017	Where's the Money	Eddie		
2018	The Thinning: New World Order	Blake Redding	YouTube Premium exclusive	
2019	Airplane Mode	Himself		
2020	Valley Girl	Mickey Bowen		
2023	Untold: Jake Paul the Problem Child	Himself	Documentary	
2024	The Sidemen Story	Himself	Documentary	
TBD	Liked	Logan		

=== Television ===
Year	Show	Role	Notes	Ref.
2015	Law & Order: Special Victims Unit	Ryan	Episode: "Intimidation Game"	
2016	Stitchers	Theo Engelsen	Episodes: "The Two Deaths of Jamie B." and "The One That Got Away"	
2016	Bizaardvark	Kirk	Episode: "The First Law of Dirk" along with Jake Paul	
2017	Jimmy Kimmel Live!	Himself	Guest	
2021	The Masked Singer	Himself	Grandpa Monster	Season 5 contestant
2021	Ridiculousness	Himself	Season 19; Episode 42	
2025	Paul American	Himself		

=== Music videos ===
Year	Artist	Title	Role	Notes
2014	Bart Baker	"Wiggle Parody"	Murray Wiggle	

=== Web ===
Year	Show	Role	Notes	Ref.
2016–2018	Logan Paul VS.	Himself	YouTube Premium exclusive; Series placed on hold in January 2018	
2016–2017	Foursome	Alec Fixler	YouTube Premium exclusive; Main role for three seasons; cut from the fourth season in January 2018	
2021	The Creator Games 3	Himself	YouTube Premium exclusive	

=== Podcast ===
Year	Title	Role	Ref.
2018–present	Impaulsive	Host	

=== Video games ===
Logan Paul in video games
Year	Title	Notes	Ref.
2022	WWE 2K22	DLC – "The Whole Dam Pack"	
2023	WWE 2K23		
2024	WWE 2K24		
2025	WWE 2K25		
2026	WWE 2K26		

=== As director ===
==== Music videos ====
Year	Title	Release date	Artist(s)
2020	Wrong	September 17, 2020	The Kid Laroi and Lil Mosey

== Discography ==
=== Singles ===
List of singles, with selected chart positions and certifications, showing year released and album name
Title	Year	Peak chart positions			Certifications	Album
Title	Year	US Bub.	AUS	NZ Heat.	Certifications	Album
"2016"	2016	—	—	—		Non-album singles
"The Song of the Summer" (with Seven Bucks featuring Desiigner and David Hasselhoff)	2017	—	—	—		Non-album singles
"Help Me Help You" (featuring Why Don't We)	2017	5	90	—	RIAA: Platinum; MC: Gold	Non-album singles
"Outta My Hair"	2017	—	—	—		Non-album singles
"No Handlebars"	2017	—	—	6		Non-album singles
"Santa Diss Track"	2017	—	—	—		Non-album singles
"The Number Song"	2018	—	—	—		Non-album singles
"Going Broke"	2020	—	—	—		Non-album singles
"2020"	2020	—	—	—		Non-album singles
"—" denotes a recording that did not chart or was not released in that territory.

=== Promotional singles ===
Title	Year	Album
"The Fall of Jake Paul" (Logan Paul featuring Why Don't We)	2017	Non-album promotional singles

=== Guest appearances ===
List of non-single guest appearances, with other performing artists
Title	Year	Other artist(s)	Album
"Under Pressure"	2020	Jessica Rothe, Josh Whitehouse, The Valley Girl Cast	Valley Girl (Music From The Motion Picture)

== Championships and accomplishments ==
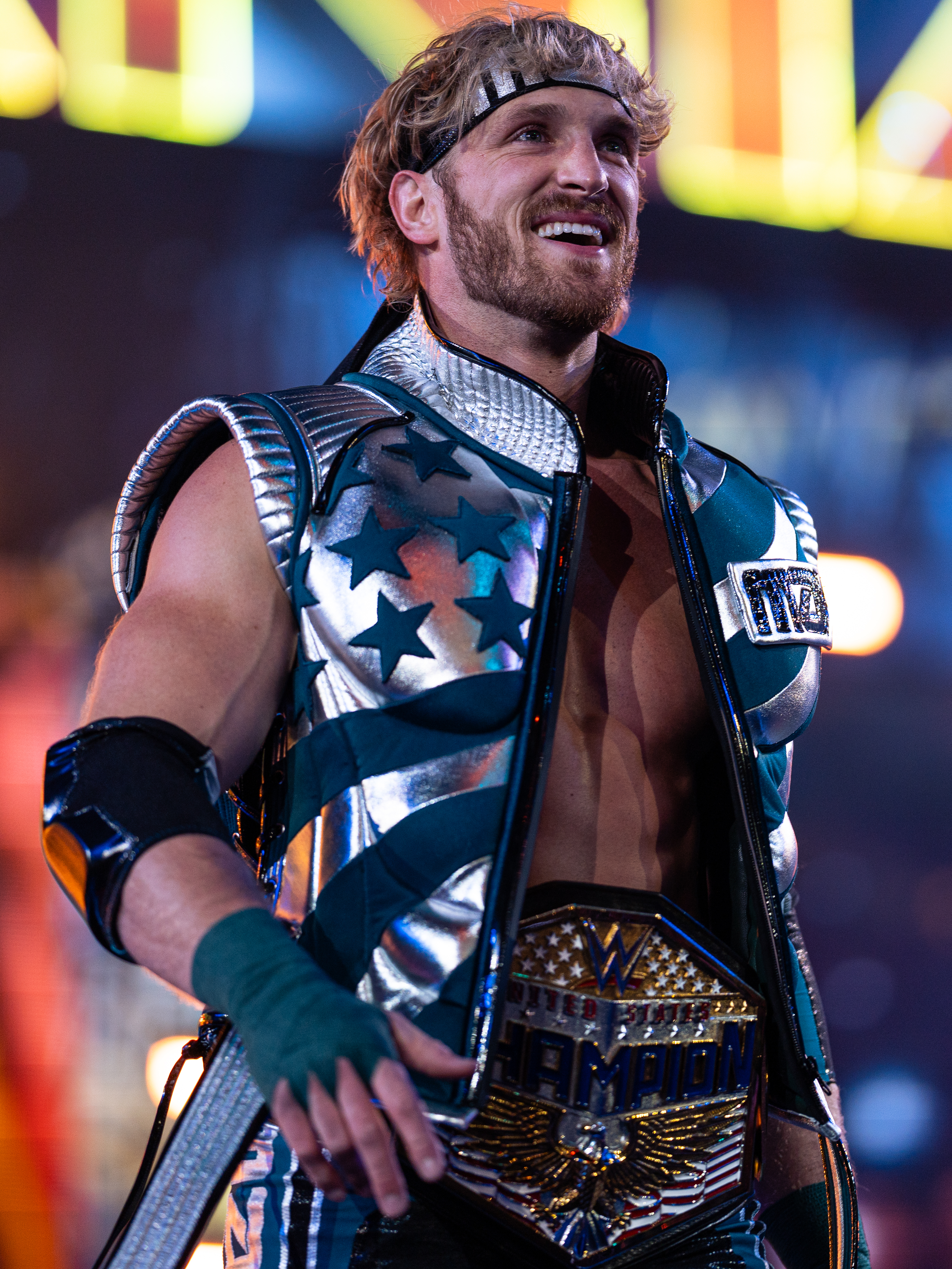
Paul is a one-time WWE United States Champion

=== Professional wrestling ===
- ESPN
  - Ranked No. 10 of the 30 best Pro Wrestlers Under 30 in 2023
- Pro Wrestling Illustrated
  - Ranked No. 37 of the top 500 singles wrestlers in the PWI 500 in 2024
  - Most Hated Wrestler of the Year (2025)
- WWE
  - WWE United States Championship (1 time)
  - World Tag Team Championship (1 time) – with Austin Theory

== Awards and nominations ==
Award ceremony	Year	Category	Nominee(s) / Work(s)	Result	Ref.
Shorty Awards	2014	Vine of the Year	"That was a close one..."	Nominated	
Shorty Awards	2014	Vineographer	Himself	Nominated	
Shorty Awards	2015	Best Vine Comedian	Himself	Nominated	
Streamy Awards	2014	Vine Comedian	Himself	Nominated	
Streamy Awards	2015	Short Form Comedy	Himself	Won	
Streamy Awards	2016	Best Ensemble Cast in a Web Series	Role in Foursome	Nominated	
Streamy Awards	2016	Best Comedy YouTuber	Himself	Nominated	
Streamy Awards	2017	Creator of the Year	Himself	Nominated	
Streamy Awards	2017	Storyteller	Himself	Nominated	
Streamy Awards	2017	Best Non-Fiction Series	Logan Paul VS.	Nominated	
Streamy Awards	2017	Best Acting in a Drama	Role in The Thinning	Nominated	
Streamy Awards	2019	Best Podcast	Impaulsive	Won	
Streamy Awards	2020	Best Podcast	Impaulsive	Nominated	
Streamy Awards	2020	First Person	Himself	Nominated	
Streamy Awards	2021	Best Podcast	Impaulsive	Nominated	
Streamy Awards	2022	Best Podcast	Impaulsive	Nominated	
Streamy Awards	2022	Creator of the Year	Himself	Nominated	
Streamy Awards	2022	Best Creator Product	Prime Hydration (shared with KSI)	Nominated	
Teen Choice Awards	2017	Male Web Star	Himself	Won	
Teen Choice Awards	2017	Comedy Web Star	Himself	Won	
Teen Choice Awards	2017	Choice YouTuber	Himself	Nominated	
The Ring Year-End Awards	2019	Event of the Year	KSI vs. Logan Paul II (shared with Matchroom Boxing and KSI)	Nominated	
Misfits Boxing Awards	2024	Feud of the Year	Himself (shared with Dillon Danis)	Pending	

Name of publication, year the record was awarded, name of the record, and the name of the record holder
Publication	Year	World record	Record holder	R. Status	Ref.
Guinness World Records	2022	Most Expensive Pokémon Trading Card Sold at a Private Sale	Logan Paul	Record	
