= CryptoZoo =

Failed blockchain game and cryptocurrency

CryptoZoo was a blockchain game co-founded by the YouTuber Logan Paul, which was considered a failure. Launched in 2021, it promised a blend of cryptocurrency and non-fungible tokens within a game.

== Background ==
CryptoZoo was marketed as an "autonomous ecosystem" where users could buy, sell, and trade exotic animals and hybrids using non-fungible tokens. The eggs were to be purchased by collectors via the accompanying in-game cryptocurrency, $ZOO, or via Ethereum. The eggs would then be hatched into random animals that would go on to breeding new cartoon eggs that would hatch in cartoon hybrids of themselves. The animals could be 'burnt' to recover $ZOO for the players.

Despite raising millions of dollars by selling NFTs and crypto coins, CryptoZoo failed to deliver on its promises. A project roadmap outlined various games incorporating the animal NFT images, but none of these features materialized, and no playable game has been published.

Logan Paul initially promoted CryptoZoo as a "really fun game that makes you money". He claimed to have spent around one million dollars on developing the project, emphasizing the massive team behind it. However, after the initial hype, Paul stopped discussing CryptoZoo and seemingly abandoned the project.

== Public response ==
Upon the release of the game, the game was mocked for featuring stock images, and it was not well received.

== Investigation and legal cases ==
In December 2022, Stephen Findeisen, better known as Coffeezilla, a YouTuber who exposes cryptocurrency scams, ran a three-part docuseries on his YouTube channel about how the game was not functional despite the fact that millions of dollars of funding had been raised from investors. Criticism included marketing the game towards children, launching the game several months before the announcement and allowing the team to purchase large amounts of cryptocurrency, which inflated its value. Paul later released a video disputing the allegations and threatened legal action against Findeisen for defamation and claiming that Findeisen broke "criminal and civil laws" by uploading a recording of a phone call with his manager, Jeff Levin, despite Texas being a one-party consent state. Paul did not elaborate on the legal and development issues of CryptoZoo. He also admitted to mistakes in hiring "conmen" and "felons" for the project. The response video was later deleted by Paul.

In January 2023, Paul apologized via Twitter, and promised to refund $1.3 million for NFT holders of CryptoZoo via a "rewards program". In February 2023, Paul was presented with a class-action lawsuit by some of those who had invested in the game. A refund program began a year later in January 2024, with Paul offering to partially refund tokens from fans who agreed to not sue him. He would also file a counter-claim against the other two defendants named in the class-action lawsuit, Eduardo Ibanez and Jake Greenbaum.

In June 2024, Paul decided to sue Findeisen for defamation, despite the earlier apologies. In a review of the initial legal documentation filed by Paul's legal team, YouTuber and legal commentator LegalEagle noted that the case was filed in the federal courts of Texas, where an anti-SLAPP motion is not available to Findeisen as a tool to prevent a costly legal battle. Findeisen would be represented by Mark Bankston and Bill Ogden of Farrar & Ball in this matter. In August 2024, Findeisen responded in a video asserting that the lawsuit is a strategic move to block investigations into Liquid Marketplace, a company co-owned by Paul, which has been accused by Canadian authorities of "multi-layered fraud".

In July 2026, The lawsuit was settled out of court without any more information being made public and officially dismissed by Logan Paul on July 15th, 2026.
