= YouTube Select =

Online advertising service

YouTube Select, formerly Google Preferred, is a program offered by YouTube, a subsidiary of Google, that allows advertisers to pay to place their ads on high-performing videos on its site. The program divides YouTube's most popular channels among 18- to 34-year-olds, comprising the most popular 5% of content on the site, into twelve categories. Its purpose is to signal advertisers that they can trust a given channel in the program to produce market friendly content.

== History ==
Google Preferred was announced at Google's 2014 Brandcast on April 30 in response to complaints from marketers that it was difficult to reach top-tier channels. It was also introduced in an attempt by YouTube to increase artificial scarcity and ad revenue.

In March 2015, after Google Preferred proved highly successful in its first year, YouTube decided to keep using Google Preferred. They implemented some minor changes to the program, however, such as reducing the number of categories from fourteen to twelve. The program was also expanded to include other countries besides the United States, including Canada.

In January 2018, stricter requirements were set, under which videos eligible for the program would be "manually curated", and only videos that meet YouTube's guidelines for advertiser-friendly content would be eligible. The changes came in the wake of controversies affecting YouTube's advertising platform in 2017, including the appearance of ads on content deemed objectionable to advertisers, as well as a recent controversy surrounding Logan Paul's "suicide forest" video (which caused him to be removed from the program).

In August 2018, a report was published on fake video views which contributed to the concerns around YouTube's reputation and the need for a more advertiser-friendly product. In May 2020, Google Preferred was rebranded as "YouTube Select", with the former iteration to be phased out by the end of the year.
