= Majority draw =

Outcome in sports

A majority draw is an outcome in several full-contact combat sports, including boxing, mixed martial arts (MMA), and other sports involving striking. In a majority draw, two of the three judges agree that neither fighter won (i.e. tied scorecards), while the third judge indicates one fighter being the winner on his/her scorecard. Thus, the majority of judges see the outcome as even and the result is announced as such, although one judge gave a victory on his/her card to one fighter.

This outcome is one of the rarest judged decisions in professional boxing and MMA, apart from a unanimous draw (where all three judges score the fight as a tie), or a split draw (where one judge scores one fighter the winner, a second judge scores the other fighter the winner, and the third judge scores the fight a draw).

== Notable examples ==
Date	Fight	Scorecards			Source(s)
September 10, 1993	Pernell Whitaker vs. Julio César Chávez	115–113 Whitaker	115–115	115–115	
September 12, 2013	Badou Jack vs. Marco Antonio Peribán	96–94 Peribán	95–95	95–95	
November 12, 2016	Tyron Woodley vs. Stephen Thompson	48–47 Woodley	47–47	47–47	
January 14, 2017	Badou Jack vs. James DeGale	114–112 DeGale	113–113	113–113	
May 19, 2018	Adonis Stevenson vs. Badou Jack	115–113 Jack	114–114	114–114	
August 25, 2018	KSI vs Logan Paul	58–57 KSI	57–57	57–57	
December 12, 2020	Deiveson Figueiredo vs. Brandon Moreno	48–46 Figueiredo	47–47	47–47	
August 3, 2024	Andy Ruiz Jr. vs. Jarrell Miller	116–112 Miller	114–114	114–114	
July 19, 2025	Manny Pacquiao vs. Mario Barrios	115–113 Barrios	114–114	114–114	
