= Professional Fighters League =

Mixed martial arts combat sport promoter

- Current season, competition or edition: 2026 in Professional Fighters League
- Sport: Mixed martial arts
- Founded: 2017; 9 years ago
- Founder: Donn Davis
- Owner: Most Valuable Promotions
- CEO: Jake Paul; Nakisa Bidarian; John Martin
- Country: United States
- Broadcaster: ESPN
- Website: pflmma.com

The Professional Fighters League (PFL) is an American mixed martial arts league founded by venture capitalist Donn Davis in 2017 and launched in 2018, following the acquisition and restructuring of the former World Series of Fighting (WSOF) promotion in 2017 by MMAX Investment Partners. It is the first major MMA organization in which individual athletes compete in a regular season, post-season and championship, rather than on a year-round basis. They have since transitioned from the league format back into a year-round basis.

The PFL currently puts on fights across eight weight-divisions: women's flyweight, bantamweight, featherweight, women's Featherweight, lightweight, welterweight, light heavyweight and heavyweight. The PFL's matches are held inside a 10-sided mixed martial arts cage known as the SmartCage, and adhere to the unified rules of mixed martial arts. The PFL initially prohibited all elbow strikes, but in November 2024, it was announced that they would finally be allowed, starting with the 2024 Championship season.

The PFL's inaugural event took place on June 7, 2018, at the Hulu Theater at Madison Square Garden in New York City. At the end, each champion of the six weight classes won a championship prize of $1 million each.

As of 2026, the PFL no longer features a league format. Now, there are multiple championship belts that are contested in several different weight classes.

== History ==
=== Founding and WSOF acquisition ===
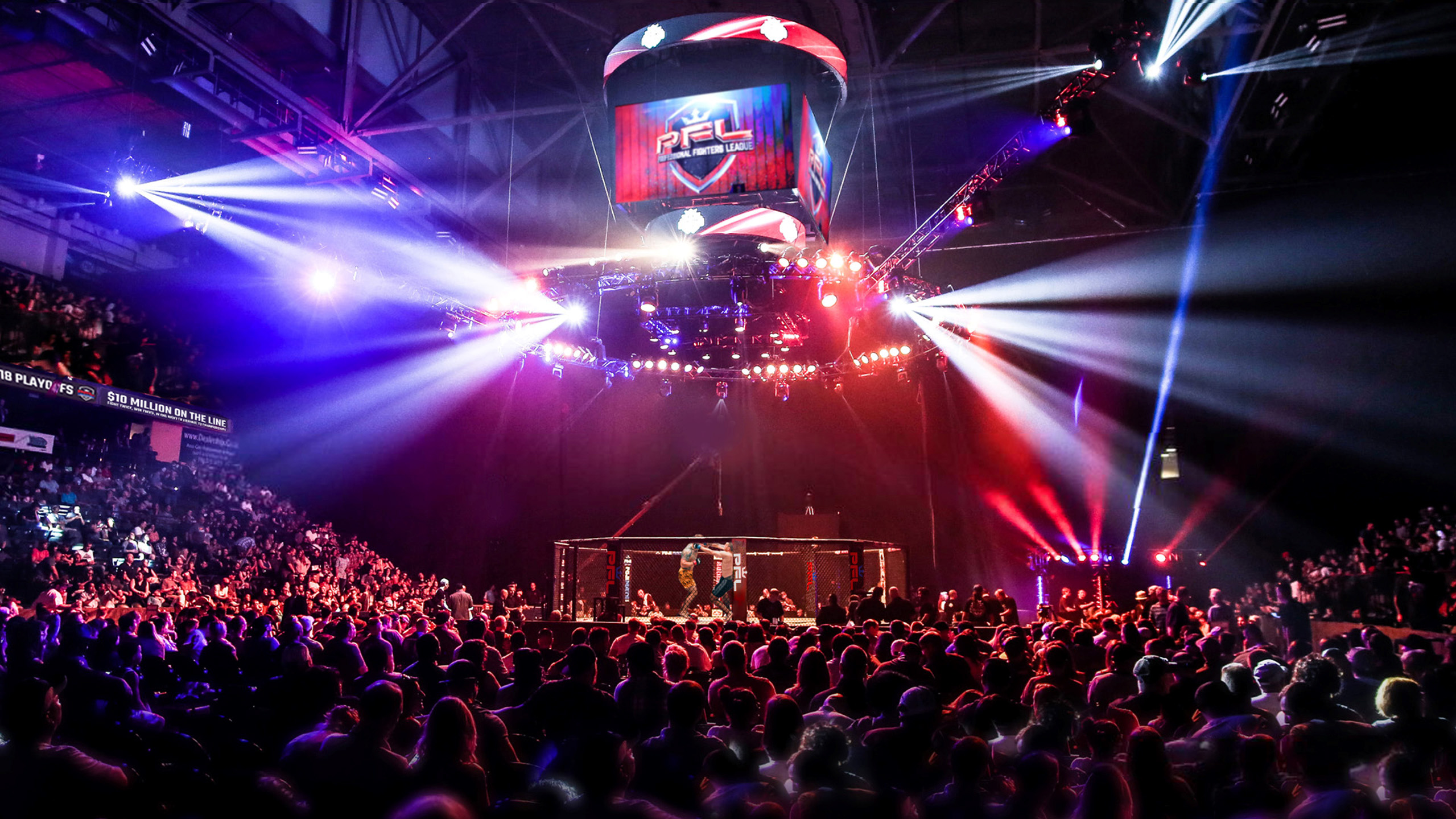
Professional Fighters League event in 2018

The World Series of Fighting (WSOF) was formed in 2012, after signing a broadcast deal with the NBC Sports Network. Soon after WSOF's first event was announced, it would be confirmed that Bas Rutten and Michael Schiavello would be commentators. Jazz Securo was the official voice and Ring Announcer of WSOF. The WSOF held over 35 events in multiple countries including the United States, Canada, Japan, China and the Philippines, and was best known for featuring fighters such as Justin Gaethje, Marlon Moraes and Lance Palmer.

In 2017, MMAX Investment Partners, a group of McLean, Virginia investors, which included financier Russ Ramsey, Mark Leschly, businessman Ted Leonsis, Washington Nationals' owner Mark Lerner and future Virginia governor Glenn Youngkin, acquired the assets of the WSOF. It was announced that the WSOF would be restructured as the Professional Fighters League (PFL), with owner Davis as founder and with the inaugural season taking place in 2018. After the restructuring, WSOF CEO Carlos Silva and WSOF president and co-founder Ray Sefo joined PFL, with Silva as president of PFL and Sefo as president of fight operations. Sefo was previously an MMA fighter and a six-time Muay Thai world champion. In January 2018, former National Football League executive Peter Murray was appointed CEO of the league. That year, in its inaugural season as the PFL, the promotion introduced a league model, the first MMA promotion to do so.

=== 2020–2021 ===
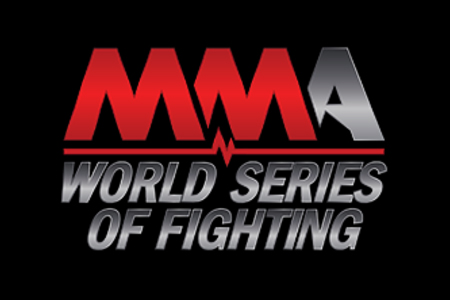
The former WSOF/PFL logo (2012-2018)

Following a partnership with blockchain reward app Socios.com in October 2020, PFL launched a fan non-fungible token (NFT) and became the first sports league to launch such a token.

In February 2021, PFL announced a $65 million financing round which expanded the total funding to $175 million. The funding round was led by Ares Capital, Elysian Park Ventures, and Knighthead Capital.

In March 2021, Hall of Fame American football player Ray Lewis joined the PFL athlete advisory board.

In April 2021, former NFL running back Marshawn Lynch and rapper Wiz Khalifa both became PFL investors. Lynch joined the ownership group, while Khalifa is an advisor. That same month, DraftKings was named the first official sportsbook and daily fantasy partner of the PFL. DraftKings would sponsor the league's pre-fight shows and use their in-fighting technology and capturing real-time data for future prop bets.

In August 2021, PFL announced a long-term partnership with Legends Hospitality, with the company purchasing a minority ownership stake.

=== 2022–present ===
In April 2022, games publisher Rival Games signed a partnership with PFL, its first with an MMA company. The deal was intended to create a gaming community for PFL and allow fans to host tournaments. In that same month, PFL signed a deal with social platform millions.co for group/party streaming. In May 2022, PFL revealed that they completed a $30 million equity round to aid in global expansion efforts and a new Pay-per-view division. Baseball player Alex Rodriguez was involved the raise and, with Daniel Leff, joined PFL's board of directors. That same month, Murray told daily newspaper the New York Post that PFL was coming back to New York City for its 2022 playoffs, with the first playoff held at the Hulu Theater at Madison Square Garden on August 5, 2022. Later that month, Live Nation Entertainment signed a deal with PFL to broadcast the 2022 playoffs in the UK, as PFL planned to host playoffs in the Cardiff International Arena in Cardiff and the Copper Box Arena in London in August 2022, following a first event in New York City.

In June 2022, PFL fighter and two-time lightweight champion Kayla Harrison was nominated for an ESPY award. In July 2022, PFL announced plans for a European league, starting in 2023. The regional league will be called PFL Europe.

In January 2023, the PFL announced a new division, known as Super Fight, with events on pay-per-view, co-founded by major influencer-turned-boxer Jake Paul. Paul's title is Head of Fighter Advocacy. Super Fight participants will earn at least 50 percent of the pay-per-view revenue, significantly higher than the 20 percent earned by fighters in the UFC.

After ten PFL athletes – including former champions – failed their drug tests during the first half of season 2023, the organization decided to hire USADA to oversee and test their athletes for banned substances, much akin to what their rival UFC has already implemented.

On August 30, 2023, the promotion announced that it had sold a minority stake for an initial investment of $100 million to SRJ Sports Investments – a branch of Public Investment Fund. As part of the agreement, SRJ supported creating PFL MENA (Middle East and North Africa) regional league. Following the deal, the previously published PPV super fight series events will be hosted in Saudi Arabia. This investment was Saudi Arabia’s first foray into MMA and will allow the PFL to “encroach into the UFC’s Middle East territory.”

=== Acquisition of Bellator MMA ===
On November 20, 2023, it was announced that the PFL had acquired its competitor Bellator MMA from Paramount Global, which aimed to make PFL “a global powerhouse and poised to become a co-leader” according to chairman Donn Davis. Although the purchase amount was not disclosed, Bellator’s value was previously estimated at $500 million. As part of the announcement, Davis confirmed that the Bellator brand would continue as a separate “reimagined” league with its athletes able to compete in PFL events. The first crossover card was held in February 2024 in Saudi Arabia, featuring pairings of champions from each promotion in four weight classes and the first female MMA bout held in Saudi Arabia. An eight-event Bellator Champions Series was also established, with its inaugural event held on March 22, 2024, and others scheduled in the US, England, and France later in the year.

=== Merger with MVP ===
In July 2026, it was announced that PFL would merge with the Most Valuable Promotions organization. The new company will be backed by existing PFL investors Founding Investors 885 Capital and Knighthead Capital Management while being led by Jake Paul and Nakisa Bidarian with PFL executive John Martin still as CEO. The combined company will operate under the MVP banner.

== PFL Challenger Series ==
PFL Challenger Series was an American mixed martial arts series. Young and up-and-coming male and female MMA fighters will compete for a slot in the PFL tournament season and a chance at $1 million. Each week, the PFL Challenger Series will consist of a celebrity guest panel featuring personalities in film, athletics and sports. In the 2021 debut airing of the PFL Challenger Series, the celebrity guest panel included NFL stars Ray Lewis and Todd Gurley and entertainers Jeremy Piven and Wiz Khalifa.

The inaugural PFL Challenger Series streamed on FuboTV and Fubo Sports Network from February 2022 to April 2022.

== PFL Europe ==
PFL Europe was a feature the top emerging European MMA fighters, and will be broadcast during prime local hours with all events staged in Europe.

The first event took place on March 25, 2023 in Newcastle, England.

== PFL MENA ==
Following the first PFL vs. Bellator champion vs champion event in Riyadh, the first major MMA held event in Saudi Arabia, PFL announced the launch of its second international league PFL MENA on February 24, 2024. The promotion’s inaugural event took place May 10 in Riyadh as part of a four-event season with 32 fighters competing in 4 weight classes, with a grand prize of $100,000.

== PFL Africa ==
In July 2024, PFL announced that they had launched their third regional league, PFL Africa. Former UFC Heavyweight Champion Francis Ngannou acts as the chairman of the league that is set to launch in the second quarter of 2025.

== Roster ==
For each season, the PFL roster begins with 72 fighters in six weight classes: five men's weight classes and one women's weight class. PFL additionally signs fighters to development contracts from the PFL Challenger Series. These fighters occasionally appear as alternates in the league season or as showcase fights opening the league events.

For the 2018 season, the PFL roster included 72 fighters in six weight classes. The 2019 roster included 68 fighters in six weight classes, including a new Women's Lightweight division.

=== Fighter signings ===
In November 2020, two-time Olympic gold medalist and #2 pound-for-pound women's boxer Claressa Shields signed a three-year contract with the Professional Fighters League to compete in the women's lightweight division. Shields plans to compete in both boxing and MMA. In December 2020, former UFC lightweight champion Anthony Pettis joined the Professional Fighters League ahead of the 2021 regular season, departing from the UFC promotion where he fought for nearly a decade.

In January 2023, YouTube influencer Jake Paul announced that he had signed a deal with the PFL to compete in their Super Fight division, which he helped launch. Though the terms of the deal were not disclosed, chairman Donn Davis confirmed it to be a multi-fight, multi-year agreement. As part of the deal Paul was named head of fighter advocacy, where he will promote PFL fighters and assist in recruitment, and was made a minority equity owner of the PFL brand. While sitting as a guest on the series The MMA Hour, Davis alluded to a 2024 Q4 PFL fight debut for Paul. Paul would depart the PFL without ever fighting for the promotion in January 2026 as his deal expired.

In May 2023, former Glory welterweight champion Cedric Doumbè signed a contract with the Professional Fighters League and attended the PFL Europe Playoff in September 2023. He debuted against Jordan Zébo, winning the fight via knockout just nine seconds into the first round.

After leaving the UFC in January 2023, former heavyweight champion Francis Ngannou joined the organization in May 2023, who CEO Peter Murray called their "number one signing" at the time. Ngannou’s agreement was characterized as a “strategic partnership” with the PFL, which gives him equity, a leadership role on the promotion’s advisory board, and allows him to pursue outside boxing fights. As part of the agreement Ngannou was also named chairman of PFL Africa. Ngannou is currently competing in the PFL’s Super Fight division, and faced Renan Ferreira in his first bout. He won the fight by knockout via ground punches in the first round.

== Events ==
=== Event history ===
==== 2018 ====
The inaugural season had 72 fighters in six weight-classes, competing in seven regular season events on Thursday nights in June, July and August. The top eight in each weight-class faced off in bracket-style, single elimination playoff fights on Saturday nights in October. The PFL 2018 season concluded on December 31, 2018, with six championship bouts back-to-back with a $10 million prize pool. The first season was headlined by a fight between Andre Harrison about Jumabieke Tuerxun and featured bouts in the featherweight and heavyweight divisions.

In 2018, the seven regular-season events were held at the Hulu Theater at Madison Square Garden, the Chicago Theatre, GWU Smith Center, Nassau Coliseum and Ocean Resort Casino. The playoff events was held at the Ernest N. Morial Convention Center, the Long Beach Arena, and the St. Elizabeths East Entertainment and Sports Arena. The championship event was held at the Hulu Theater at Madison Square Garden.

==== 2019 ====
The PFL 2019 regular season consisted of six weight classes and six events spanning from May to August. Playoffs consisted of three events and the season culminates with the Championship Event on New Year's Eve 2019.

==== 2020 ====
The PFL 2020 season was postponed due to the COVID-19 pandemic. As a measure to relieve the financial pressure of the athletes, the organization decided to hand out monthly stipends to the contracted fighters. Reactions to the stipend were mixed, with fighter Lance Palmer complaining about the amount of the stipend and with fighter Natan Schulte applauding the monthly stipend. According to multiple fighters, the stipend was $1,000 per month.

In September 2020, PFL introduced a new series called "Inside the Season," produced in partnership with the United States Marine Corp, that detailed the journey fighters go on through training, regular season, playoffs and championships. The series is narrated by actor John C. McGinley and airs on ESPNews.

==== 2021 ====
Two-time Olympic gold medalist and top pound-for-pound women's boxer Claressa Shields signed a three-year contract with the Professional Fighters League to compete in the Women's Lightweight division and former UFC lightweight champ Anthony Pettis who joined the Professional Fighters League ahead of the 2021 regular season.

PFL's 2021 roster included 60 fighters competing across six weight classes. The late additions to the season were the welterweights Gleison Tibau, Alexey Kunchenko and Jason Ponet, featherweights Chris Wade and Anthony Dizy, women's lightweights Kaitlin Young and Taylor Guardado and light heavyweight Nick Roehrick.

In December 2021, PFL announced a multi-year partnership for its new PFL Challenger Series with streaming television provider fuboTV on its Fubo Sports Network. Set to debut in February 2022, the new event will see fighters competing for a chance to earn a PFL contract and will incorporate a celebrity judging panel, a fan vote, sports betting and gamification.

== Broadcast ==
On January 29, 2018, the League announced it had reached a multi-platform distribution deal for the inaugural 2018 season with NBC Sports Group and Facebook. Within the United States, NBC Sports Group established a live Thursday night PFL franchise, presenting seven regular-season live events in prime time exclusively on NBCSN beginning June 7, 2018, through the end of August 2018. Events televised by NBCSN also streamed on NBCSports.com and the NBC Sports app. All regular season events had encore telecasts on NBCSN later the same night. Outside the U.S., Facebook streamed up to six hours of live coverage for each event. Facebook also opened each event with a live 30-minute pre-fight show and closed each with a live 30-minute post-fight show. In the U.S., fans were able to watch the first three hours of undercard coverage of each event on Facebook prior to NBCSN's presentation of the main bouts.

Beginning in February 2019, the PFL's events are broadcast by ESPN in the United States and TSN in Canada. PFL events and playoff matches air on ESPN+ and ESPN2, with the Championship Event on New Year's Eve airing exclusively on ESPN2 and ESPN Deportes.

The PFL international distribution is handled by combat sports rights distributor Fighting Spirit. PFL airs on Claro Sports in Hispanic America, Combate in Brazil, MMA TV in the United Kingdom, MMA TV in Nordic countries, Match TV and Boets TV in Russia, JSBC in China, beIN Sports in the Middle East and Northern Africa, and ESPN in sub-Saharan Africa.

In August 2020, the PFL launched an over the top (OTT) platform via its mobile app. In October 2021, the PFL signed a distribution deal with sports media company Wave.tv.

As of 2026, the PFL is broadcast in 160 countries, through media partners like ESPN in the United States, Globo in Brazil, which renewed its rights as the exclusive broadcast partner for the country in a multi-year agreement in March 2024, Bild in Germany, RMC Sports in France, Eurosport in India, and Telesport in Russia. In January 2022, it was announced that PFL and ESPN struck a multi-year contract extension for broadcasting rights in the United States.

In October 2022, the PFL is broadcast by Fast Sports HD in Pakistan

In February 2024, PFL announced its agreement with TV Nova to become the exclusive broadcast partner for Czech Republic and Slovakia for 2024-2025, followed by an agreement with Sub-Saharan African organization SuperSport in March 2024 to broadcast all PFL programming in the region. In March 2024, PFL announced its agreement with Warner Bros. Discovery for exclusive rights to carry the Bellator Champions Series for the United States. The 8 events will stream live on Max, which began with Bellator Champions Series Belfast on March 22.

=== Broadcast team ===
PFL's 2018 broadcast team for live events and pre- and post-event shows included Randy Couture, Bas Rutten, Yves Edwards, Caroline Pearce and Todd Harris. Harris provided play-by-play while Couture provided color commentary. Rutten and Pearce conducted pre- and post-fight interviews and Edwards offered video breakdowns and fight analysis.

The 2019 broadcast team for live events and pre- and post-event shows included 2018 PFL light heavyweight champion Sean O'Connell, Randy Couture, Caroline Pearce and former UFC lightweight Yves Edwards, with former WWE ring announcer Lilian Garcia as in-cage announcer.

The 2021 broadcast team included Randy Couture, Kenny Florian, Sean O'Connell, Lillian Garcia and Chael Sonnen.

The 2022 broadcast team included Randy Couture, Kenny Florian, Sean O'Connell and Lilian Garcia.

The 2024 Regular Season broadcast team includes Randy Couture, Tyron Woodley, and Sean O'Connell.

The 2025 / 2026 broadcast team includes Sean O'Connell, Randy Couture, and Dan Hardy.

== See also ==
- List of PFL events
- List of PFL champions
- List of current PFL fighters
- Riyadh Season
- Most Valuable Promotions
