= Jake Paul vs. Anthony Joshua =

2025 professional boxing match

Judgment Day
- Date: December 19, 2025
- Venue: Kaseya Center, Miami, Florida. U.S.

Tale of the tape
Boxer	Jake Paul	Anthony Joshua
Nickname	El Gallo ("The Rooster")	AJ
Hometown	Cleveland, Ohio, U.S.	Watford, Hertfordshire, England
Pre-fight record	12–1 (7 KOs)	28–4 (25 KOs)
Age	28 years, 9 months	36 years, 2 months
Height	6 ft 1 in (1.85 m)	6 ft 6 in (1.98 m)
Weight	216.6 lb (98 kg)	243.4 lb (110 kg)
Style	Orthodox	Orthodox
Recognition	WBA; No. 15 Ranked Cruiserweight	IBF/WBO; No. 1 Ranked Heavyweight; The Ring/TBRB; No. 2 Ranked Heavyweight; Former two-time unified heavyweight champion

Result
- Joshua wins by 6th-round KO

Jake Paul vs. Anthony Joshua, billed as Judgment Day, was a heavyweight professional boxing match that was contested between YouTuber-turned-boxer Jake Paul and former two-time unified heavyweight champion Anthony Joshua. The fight took place on Friday December 19, 2025 at the Kaseya Center in Miami, Florida. The fight was set to last eight 3-minute rounds, and was fought with 10 oz gloves. The fight was broadcast on Netflix, and the purse has been reported to be $184 million.

Announced in November 2025, the fight was criticised for the size difference of the fighters—with Joshua weighing-in 26.8 lb (12.2 kg) heavier and 5 in (13 cm) taller—as well as their gulf in experience. Joshua defeated Paul via knockout in the sixth round. Paul was hospitalized after suffering a broken jaw. He required surgery to have two titanium plates fitted and some teeth removed.

== Background and build-up ==
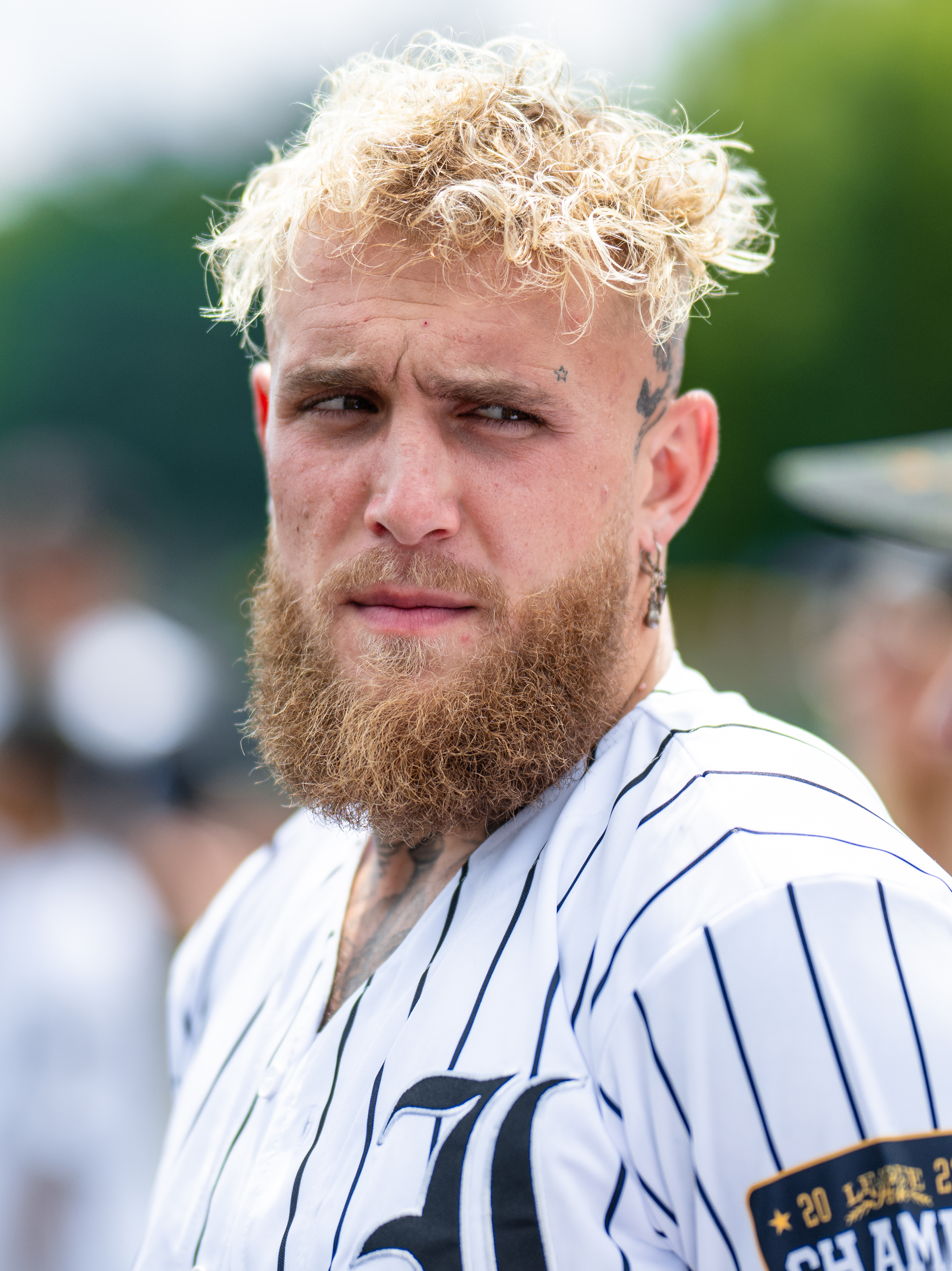
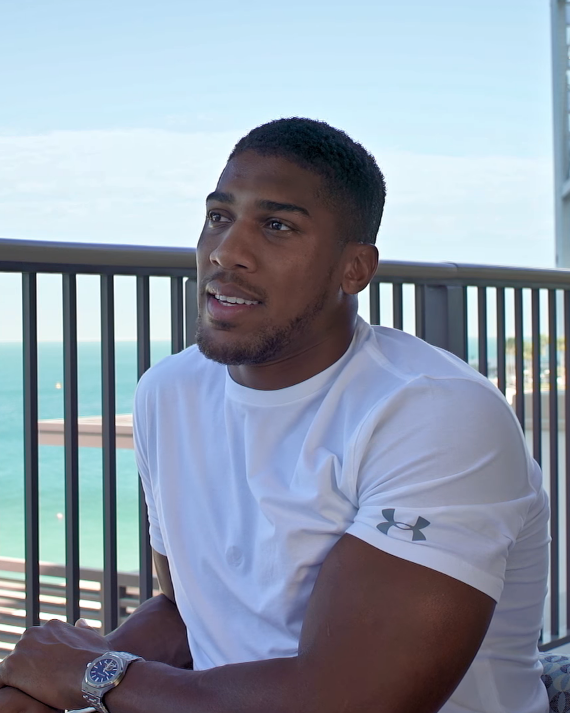
Jake Paul (left) and Anthony Joshua.

In July 2025, Eddie Hearn discussed a possible fight between Paul and Joshua, noting the increasing interest following Paul's earlier call-out to Joshua. He mentioned that conversations were ongoing with Turki Alalshikh. He said, "You know, obviously it'll be up to AJ and myself what AJ does, and Nakisa [Bidarian] and Jake, what they do – but also the power of Turki Alalshikh bringing it together, making it a mega-event. We're up for it. You know, it's not a fight we targeted. It's not a fight we anticipated. But as I said, if it's there and it's open and it's a running-up fight before Tyson Fury, why not?" Hearn suggested that the fight could attract considerable viewership and revenue, even though there were concerns about its competitiveness. Ben Davison, Joshua's trainer, expressed concerns about the safety risks associated with him fighting Paul. Davison was not under a long-term contract with Joshua; instead, their arrangement was more flexible, which suggested that he might not be training Joshua for the upcoming fight.

On August 8, it was announced that Joshua would return to the ring in December 2025. One potential opponent was French Olympic gold medallist Tony Yoka (14–3, 11 KOs). Another possible opponent was Paul, although Joshua stated that he was not interested in influencer boxing. Yoka recently signed with Queensberry Promotions, which increased the chances of a matchup with Joshua. French promoter Yohan Zaoui was confident that Joshua would fight Yoka next. According to Hearn, Paul was the "front-runner" for Joshua's next fight. On August 20, Paul announced an exhibition fight against WBA lightweight champion Gervonta Davis to take place in November 2025. Two weeks prior to their fight, Davis was mentioned in a civil lawsuit that accused him of violent behavior, battery, and kidnapping. On November 4, Most Valuable Promotions (MVP) and Netflix announced the cancellation of the card.

On November 12, The Ring reported that both Paul and Joshua were finalizing a deal to fight in December in Miami, on Netflix. Negotiations were challenging due to Joshua being tied to DAZN, and Paul wanting to use Netflix. Paul had considered other opponents like Terence Crawford and Ryan Garcia, but they were unavailable. Following the cancellation of the Davis fight, Paul began recruiting heavyweight sparring partners to prepare for his next fight. On November 13, Hearn stated the reports of the fight agreement nearing were premature. Joshua was scheduled to fight in Riyadh in February 2026 and was likely to take a low-key fight before then, which was rumoured to be American boxer Cassius Chaney, according to Chaney's coach Kenny Ellis. Hearn later confirmed these rumours, stating Joshua vs. Chaney was going to be a surprise bout on the Ring IV: Night Of Champions event on November 22. The two fights would then lead up to a mega-fight against Tyson Fury, in the fall of 2026.

On November 17, a heavyweight boxing match between Paul and Joshua was officially announced, scheduled for December 19, at the Kaseya Center in Miami. It was announced that the event would be streamed live on Netflix and would feature eight rounds of three minutes each with 10-ounce gloves. The fight represented a significant challenge for Paul, who had primarily competed as a cruiserweight and considerably less professional experience compared to Joshua, known for his extensive boxing background and power.

Paul first announced the fight in a statement which read,

This isn't an AI simulation. This is Judgment Day, A professional heavyweight fight against an elite world champion in his prime. When I beat Anthony Joshua, every doubt disappears, and no one can deny me the opportunity to fight for a world title. To all my haters, this is what you wanted. To the people of the United Kingdom, I am sorry. On Friday, December 19, under the lights in Miami, live globally only on Netflix, the torch gets passed and Britain's Goliath gets put to sleep.

Joshua said, "Jake or anyone can get this work. No mercy ... I'm about to break the internet over Jake Paul's face." Hearn noted the risks for Paul, suggesting he may face a harsh reality in the ring against a top-tier opponent. A clause in the contract stated that, despite heavyweight being unlimited, Joshua was not to weigh more than 245 pounds. Nakisa Bidarian said the fight was originally going to be targeted for Spring 2026 after Paul originally started calling out Joshua as early as March 2025. During the build up, Paul likened the fight to Ruiz's upset victory over Joshua, suggesting that he could achieve a similar outcome. He was confident in his abilities, claiming he possessed speed, footwork, and resilience that could challenge Joshua, also noting that he is a much smaller opponent.

For his preparation, Paul brought in heavyweight contenders Frank Sánchez, Jared Anderson and Lawrence Okolie. According to trainer Joe Gallagher, Okolie had spoken positively about Paul's training efforts. Two weeks before the fight, Paul was seen in a video sporting a black eye, which he sustained during a sparring session with Okolie. Despite the injury, Paul was expected to fully recover in time for the fight. During the interview, Paul mentioned his current weight of 215 pounds, indicating he needed to reach between 218 and 220 pounds for the bout.

During fight week, DraftKings listed Joshua a 12–1 favorite. Joshua stated he had no inclination to take it easy on Paul in their bout, regarded as a mismatch. He was focused on achieving a decisive victory similar to his second-round knockout of Francis Ngannou in March 2024. Stating it was not personal, he said, "And it's not even that it's Jake. It's just – do you know, I was actually looking at myself today. I'm a very like respectful guy, brought up by a good family. But if I can kill you, I will kill you. That's just how I am. And this is just the job I do, so let's go." During the final press conference, Paul confirmed the ring size would be 22-by-22-foot, bigger than the standard 20-by-20.

The fight was overseen by USADA for drug testing. Paul and Joshua were undergoing extensive testing, according to Hearn. Bidarian explained they requested more rigorous testing with USADA, focusing on their credibility. According to Hearn, the decision to use them over VADA (the Voluntary Anti-Doping Association) was made by MVP. He said, "Yeah, but we've been VADA-tested our whole career. USADA are a very reputable agency as well. We didn't have a problem with it. USADA are extremely reputable, it's not like some random agency that's popped up from nowhere. But we were tested by UKAD as well. Well over half-a-dozen tests, I believe. So we were happy with the procedure."

== Weigh in ==
The weigh in took place on December 18, at the Jackie Gleason Theater at The Fillmore in Miami. It was the first time Joshua had to make weight (245 pounds (111 kg)) in his professional career. He weighed in at 243.4 pounds (110.4 kg), his lightest since his first defeat to Usyk in 2021, where he weighed 240 pounds (110 kg). In comparison, when he made his debut in 2013, he weighed 229 pounds (104 kg). Paul weighed in at 216.6 pounds (98.2 kg). After weighing in, Joshua joked, "I can't wait to eat."

Paul and Joshua engaged in a heated stare down, with Joshua delivering a stark warning to Paul, "I'm a serious fighter. You're going to get fucked up." Then standing side-by-side with Hearn, he said, "He [Hearn] helped Jake have his pro debut, and he's brought me in to end Jake Paul's boxing career." Paul responded, "I smell fear. I truly do. The pressure is on him. I'm fighting free. I've already won. This is a lose-lose situation for him. I've got him in a corner right where I want him. ... I'm fucking him up."

For the notable undercard fights, Baumgardner came in at 129.2 pounds (58.6 kg), and her opponent Beaudoin weighed in at 130 pounds (59 kg). Johnson stepped on the scales at 117 pounds (53 kg) and Galle weighed 117.4 pounds (53.3 kg). Dubois, making her MVP debut weighed in at 134.2 pounds (60.9 kg) and Panatta weighed the same. Silva weighed 191.4 pounds (86.8 kg) with Woodley weighing in at 194 pounds (88 kg).

== Fight details ==
On fight night, Joshua entered the ring solo first, wearing a camouflage jacket. Paul, wearing a tracksuit inspired by the late professional wrestler Hulk Hogan, made his ringwalk second with American rapper 6ix9ine, performing his song "Billy".

Joshua dropped Paul four times, defeated him via sixth-round knockout, after challenging early rounds. In the opening rounds, Paul used a defensive strategy, moving away from Joshua to avoid any engagement. This helped prolong the fight. Joshua targeted Paul's body and head with jabs and short combinations but struggled to land powerful punches. Paul landed a few jabs and rights but mostly evaded Joshua's attacks. In the third round, Paul's movement began to frustrate Joshua, but did not stop him from increasing pressure. Joshua was able to land a clean uppercut in the fourth. By the fifth round, Joshua broke through Paul's defense, as Paul began to show signs of fatigue, dropping Paul multiple times. Paul landed his signature overhand right, but was countered with a hard uppercut and a combination, which sent Paul down. Before the round ended, Paul was visibly exhausted. The ending came in the sixth round, when Joshua landed a straight right followed with a right-left combination, knocking Paul down for the time at 1 minute 31 seconds. Paul attempted to get up but the referee counted him out as he reached his feet.

During the post-fight interviews, Joshua praised Paul, "Jake Paul, he's done really well tonight. I want to give him his props. He got up time and time again. It was difficult in there for him, but he kept on trying to find a way. It takes a real man to do that. Anyone who laces up the gloves, we always say we give them their respect. We have to give Jake his respect for trying. Well done, but he came up against a real fighter tonight."

According to CompuBox, Joshua landed 48 of 146 punches (33%), while Paul landed with just 16 of his 56 shots (29%).

All three judges had the same scorecard (50–43), in favor of Joshua.

=== Post-fight ===
Joshua called out rival Tyson Fury for a potential fight in 2026, suggesting this bout is part of his roadmap back to top-tier heavyweight competition. Paul confirmed his broken jaw and planned to recover, then continue his journey to pursue a world title at cruiserweight.

During the post-fight press conference, Joshua expressed his dissatisfaction in his performance. He said, "What I could have done better is a lot of things, one hundred percent. In the fight game, you've seen the amazing fighters that have graced us over the last hundred years. The expectations that we put on ourselves are immense, but I tried my best. Jake [did] well while it lasted. I wish that I could have knocked him out at the start, but as we saw tonight, Jake has spirit. He has some heart. He tried his best, and I take my hat off to him. Because number one, a lot of fighters haven't got in the ring with me, and Jake did. And secondly, even when he got knocked down, he kept on trying to get up."

== Aftermath ==
Paul drove himself to the hospital where he confirmed he had broken his jaw in two places. He shared on social media that he had two titanium plates fitted and some teeth removed, and that he would be on a liquid diet for the next week as part of his recovery process. An X-ray image was also posted, revealing the double fracture on his jawline.

Paul made a claim that he wobbled Joshua and won at least two rounds, referring to the opening two rounds. He told Logan Paul on the Impaulsive podcast, "I won two rounds then he won two, then I got dropped. But I was doing good, my cardio, just the mental pressure of the big guy, and sparring the big people is different than the 10oz gloves so I was feeling his power a lot more. It was a great experience, I learnt a lot in there." He also wished he had more time to prepare and build muscle.

In a May 2026 interview with Ariel Helwani, Paul claimed that his boxing career was "most definitely" in doubt due to the jaw injuries that he suffered.

== Fight card ==
Weight Class		vs.		Method	Round	Time	Notes
Main Card (Netflix)
Heavyweight	Anthony Joshua	def.	Jake Paul	KO	6/8	1:31
Super featherweight	Alycia Baumgardner (c)	def.	Leila Beaudoin	UD	12	3:00	^{Note 1}
Cruiserweight	Anderson Silva	def.	Tyron Woodley	TKO	2/6	1:33
Super featherweight	Jahmal Harvey	def.	Kevin Cervantes	UD	6	3:00
Preliminary card (YouTube & Tudum)
Bantamweight	Cherneka Johnson (c)	def.	Amanda Galle	UD	10	2:00	^{Note 2}
Lightweight	Caroline Dubois (c)	def.	Camilla Panatta	UD	10	2:00	^{Note 3}
Strawweight	Yokasta Valle (c)	def.	Yadira Bustillos	MD	10	2:00	^{Note 4}
Welterweight	Avious Griffin	def.	Justin Cardona	KO	1/8	2:59
Cruiserweight	Keno Marley	def.	Diarra Davis Jr.	UD	4	3:00

^Note 1 For WBA, IBF, WBO and The Ring female super featherweight titles
^Note 2 For WBA, WBC, IBF, WBO and The Ring female bantamweight titles
^Note 3 For WBC female lightweight title
^Note 4 For WBC female strawweight title

== Reception and viewership ==
The fight received significant viewership success for Netflix, attracting 33 million viewers globally. The figure reflected the average minute audience. The event ranked as the top program on Netflix in 45 countries, including major markets such as the US, UK, Canada and Germany. Everpass, a commercial streaming service, estimated that around 600,000 viewers watched the fight at various commercial venues. The fight marked the second major boxing event on Netflix in 2025, following Canelo Álvarez vs. Terence Crawford in September, which garnered 41.5 million viewers. Paul's fight against Mike Tyson in November 2024 was the most-streamed sporting event ever, having peaked at 108 million viewers.

The event achieved a significant milestone by generating the highest-grossing boxing gate in the history of the Kaseya Center, from a sell-out crowd.

== Reaction ==
Prior to the fight being officially announced, Tyson Fury, a long time rival of Joshua and former unified heavyweight champion, said "Jake Paul chins AJ [...] 100 percent. If they fight, I'm putting a million pounds on Jake Paul."

After the fight was announced, it drew criticism from many pundits, as they believed the fight was mismatched in physical size and skill level between the fighters, Joshua being much heavier and larger than Paul and having more experience at championship level boxing than Paul. When asked about the proposed fight, British boxer Dave Allen said "it's ridiculous, it's a joke". Donald McRae, a commentator for The Guardian, called the event a "circus fight", going on to say "Hopefully, there will be no need for Paul to be taken away in an ambulance". Promoter Frank Warren described it as having "car crash" potential, indicating it may not go as expected. He also criticized Joshua for choosing a financially safe option instead of facing a more challenging opponent like Moses Itauma.

CBS Sports noted that the titanium plates which were installed in Paul's mouth following the match also resulted in him being unable to eat solid food for at least seven days.

U.S. President Donald Trump wrote on Truth Social: "On the plane I just got to watch the Jake Paul Fight, and he did really well, especially as a display of GREAT Courage against a very talented and large Anthony Joshua, Fantastic Entertainment, but Kudos to Jake for his Stamina, and frankly, Ability, against a much bigger man!".
