= Bidarian =

Bidarian is a surname. Notable people with the surname include:

- Mohammad Bidarian (born 1988), Iranian swimmer
- Nakisa Bidarian (born 1978), Canadian sports promoter
