= Almudena Álvarez =

Spanish boxer (born 1982)

Personal information
- Nationality: Spanish
- Born: Alumdena Álvarez De la Puente; 13 November 1982 (age 43)
- Height: 5 ft 7 in (170 cm)
- Weight: Super-featherweight, Featherweight

Boxing career
- Stance: Orthodox

Boxing record
- Total fights: 12
- Wins: 7
- Win by KO: 2
- Losses: 5

Almudena Álvarez De la Puente (born 13 November 1982) is a Spanish professional boxer. She held the European female super-featherweight title from November 2024 until May 2026.

== Career ==
As an amateur, Álvarez won three successive national titles between 2017 and 2019 as well as a bronze medal at the 2018 Boxam International.

Having turned professional in 2022, she became Spanish female super-featherweight champion by defeating Alba Sánchez via unanimous decision to claim the vacant title at Polideportivo Los Rosales in Móstoles on 16 March 2024.

In her next bout, and just four days before her 42nd birthday, Álvarez faced Marian Herrería for the vacant European female super-featherweight title at Polideportivo Pau 4 Sur in Móstoles on 9 November 2024. The contest was stopped at the start of the eighth round on the advice of the ringside doctor due to a swelling on Herrería's face caused by an accidental clash of heads during round four. Álvarez was ahead 80–73 on all three judges' scorecards at the time, therefore was awarded the fight, and the championship, by unanimous technical decision.

She faced Dina Thorslund for the vacant WBC interim female featherweight title at Sydbank Arena in Kolding, Denmark, on 31 January 2026, losing via unanimous decision.

Álvarez made the first defense of her European super-featherweight title against Martina Righi at PalaCorradi in Arenzano, Italy, on 30 May 2026, losing by split decision with the judges' scorecards reading 91–99, 96–94 and 92–98.
