= Tamao Ozawa =

Japanese boxer (born 1985)

Personal information
- Nationality: Japanese
- Born: 16 May 1985 (age 41) Nagano, Nagano Prefecture, Japan
- Height: 161 cm (5 ft 3 in)
- Weight: Super-flyweight, Flyweight, Light-flyweight

Boxing career
- Stance: Orthodox

Boxing record
- Total fights: 22
- Wins: 17
- Win by KO: 6
- Losses: 5

Tamao Ozawa (小沢珠緒, Ozawa Tamao; born 16 May 1985) is a Japanese retired professional boxer who is a former WBO female super-flyweight champion.

== Career ==
Ozawa made her professional boxing debut in August 2011, going on to win the vacant Oriental and Pacific Boxing Federation super-flyweight title on 3 April 2015, with a split decision victory over Terumi Nuki at the Prefectural Gymnasium, Osaka, Japan.

She was unsuccessful in her first attempt to win a world title, losing via split decision to South Korea's Hong Su-yun in a contest for the vacant WBO female light-flyweight crown at KBS Hall, Kyoto, Japan, on 14 May 2017. One ringside judge scored the bout 96–94 to Ozawa with the other two awarding it by the same score to her opponent.

Switching to back to super-flyweight, Ozawa travelled to Germany to face Raja Amasheh for the vacant WBO female super-flyweight title at Palazzohalle, Karlsruhe, on 10 March 2018. Once again she fell short, losing by unanimous decision with all three judges scorecards' reading 96–94.

Ozawa bounced back to win the vacant Japanese flyweight title on 14 April 2019, beating Hye Soo Park by unanimous decision at KBS Hall.

After a three-year hiatus during which time she gave birth to a son, Ozawa returned to the ring on 30 May 2022, to challenge WBO female super-flyweight champion Miyo Yoshida at Korakuen Hall, Tokyo, Japan. She won the fight by split decision to finally claim a global title. Two judges favoured Ozawa 97-93 while the third saw the fight 96-94 for Yoshida.

Ozawa announced her retirement from professional boxing on 27 October 2022. In a written statement revealing her decision she said: "With the support of my husband (pianist Ryohei Kishimoto) and the patience of my son, I was somehow able to take part in the world fight in May. I thought about my family's future and decided to put an end to it here. I have been working hard to become world champion, so I am grateful to have been given this opportunity, and I feel that I have received a great reward at the end. I have had many good connections thanks to my continued boxing. Thank you."

== Professional boxing record ==
22 fights	17 wins	5 losses
By knockout	6	2
By decision	11	3

No.	Result	Record	Opponent	Type	Round, time	Date	Location	Notes
22	Win	17–5	Miyo Yoshida	SD	10 (10)	30 May 2022	Korakuen Hall, Tokyo, Japan	Won the vacant WBO female super-flyweight World title
21	Win	16–5	Hye Soo Park	UD	6 (6)	14 April 2019	KBS Hall, Kyoto, Japan	For the vacant Japanese female flyweight title
20	Win	15–5	Aisah Alico	TKO	3 (8)	25 November 2018	KBS Hall, Kyoto, Japan	
19	Win	14–5	Phannaluk Kongsang	UD	8 (8)	29 July 2018	KBS Hall, Kyoto, Japan	
18	Loss	13–5	Raja Amasheh	UD	10 (10)	10 March 2018	Palazzohalle, Karlsruhe, Germany	For the vacant WBO female light-flyweight World title
17	Win	13–4	Eun Young Huh	TKO	5 (8)	30 September 2017	KBS Hall, Kyoto, Japan	
16	Loss	12–4	Hong Su-yun	SD	10 (10)	14 May 2017	KBS Hall, Kyoto, Japan	For the vacant WBO female light-flyweight World title
15	Win	12–3	Yuki Koseki	UD	6 (6)	31 December 2016	Shimazu Arena, Kyoto, Japan	
14	Win	11–3	Suda Chaimaroeng	TKO	4 (8)	24 August 2016	Shimazu Arena, Kyoto, Japan	
13	Loss	10–3	Mariana Juárez	UD	10 (10)	14 May 2016	Arena Coliseo, Mexico City, Mexico	For the WBC female super-flyweight International title
12	Win	10–2	Sirilak Muangchoen	RTD	3 (8)	19 December 2015	Sirasa Stein Studios, Colombo, Sri Lanka	
11	Win	9–2	Carleans Rivas	UD	6 (6)	16 September 2015	Shimazu Arena, Kyoto, Japan	
10	Win	8–2	Terumi Nuki	SD	8 (8)	3 April 2015	Prefectural Gymnasium, Osaka, Japan	For the vacant Oriental and Pacific Boxing Federation female super-flyweight title
9	Win	7–2	Kai Johnson	SD	8 (8)	20 September 2014	Azalea Taisho, Osaka, Japan	
8	Loss	6–2	Kai Johnson	KO	2 (6)	3 March 2014	Korakuen Hall, Tokyo, Japan	
7	Win	6–1	Suwanchai Pankhlueap	UD	8 (8)	14 December 2013	Azalea Taisho, Osaka, Japan	
6	Loss	5–1	Tomoko Kawanishi	TKO	1 (8)	24 August 2013	Bodymaker Colosseum, Osaka, Japan	For the Oriental and Pacific Boxing Federation female super-flyweight title
5	Win	5–0	Maho Tamamori	MD	6 (6)	19 February 2013	Azalea Taisho, Osaka, Japan	
4	Win	4–0	Maho Tamamori	UD	6 (6)	16 September 2012	Yomiuri Bunka Hall, Toyonaka, Japan	
3	Win	3–0	Asako Tonarii	TKO	3 (4)	26 June 2012	Central Gym, Kobe, Japan	
2	Win	2–0	Tomoko Chiba	TKO	2 (4)	19 February 2012	Yomiuri Bunka Hall, Toyonaka, Japan	
1	Win	1–0	Khwunchit Khunya	MD	4 (4)	28 August 2011	Yomiuri Bunka Hall, Toyonaka, Japan	

Sporting positions
World boxing titles
Preceded by Miyo Yoshida	WBO female super-flyweight champion May 30, 2022 – October 27, 2022; Vacated	Succeeded by Mizuki Hiruta
