= Tatyana Zrazhevskaya =

Kazakhstan-born Russian boxer (born 1992)

Tatyana Zrazhevskaya Татьяна Зражевская
Personal information
- Nickname: Black Panther
- Nationality: Russian
- Born: 30 January 1992 (age 34) Cholakkorgan, South Kazakhstan, Kazakhstan
- Height: 5 ft 6 in (168 cm)
- Weight: Bantamweight; Super-bantamweight

Boxing career

Boxing record
- Total fights: 13
- Wins: 12
- Win by KO: 4
- Losses: 1

Tatyana Viktorovna Zrazhevskaya (Russian: Татьяна Викторовна Зражевская) is a Kazakhstan-born Russian professional boxer who held the WBC interim female bantamweight title between March 2021 and September 2021.

== Professional career ==
Zrazhevskaya made her professional debut on 4 July 2016, scoring a fourth-round technical knockout victory against Olga Zabavina at the Korston Club in Moscow, Russia.

After compiling a record of 6–0 (2 KOs), she defeated Gabriella Busa via ten-round unanimous decision (UD) on 16 June 2018, capturing the WBC Silver female super-bantamweight title at the Ballhaus Forum in Munich, Germany. Two judges scored the bout 100–91 and the third judge scored it 100–90.

Following three more victories she defeated Estrella Valverde via ten-round UD on 27 March 2021, capturing the vacant WBC interim female bantamweight title at the RCC Boxing Academy in Yekaterinburg, Russia. Two judges scored the bout 100–90 and the third scored it 100–91.

She lost the title to Jessica González by split decision also at RCC Boxing Academy on 11 September 2021. The judges' scores were 96–94, 93–98 and 94–96.

== Professional boxing record ==
12 fights	11 wins	1 loss
By knockout	3	0
By decision	8	1

No.	Result	Record	Opponent	Type	Round, time	Date	Location	Notes
13	Win	12–1	(Tanzania) Fatuma Yazidu	TKO	3 (6), 1:51	19 Aug 2022	Luzales Arena, Syktyvkar, Russia	
12	Loss	11–1	(Mexico) Jessica González	SD	10	11 Sep 2021	RCC Boxing Academy, Yekaterinburg, Russia	Lost WBC interim female bantamweight title
11	Win	11–0	(Mexico) Estrella Valverde	UD	10	27 Mar 2021	RCC Boxing Academy, Yekaterinburg, Russia	Won vacant WBC interim female bantamweight title
10	Win	10–0	(Russia) Lidia Sakhonchik	TKO	5 (8), 1:42	22 Aug 2020	Pyramide, Kazan, Russia	
9	Win	9–0	(Hungary) Gabriella Mezei	UD	8	26 Oct 2019	Maritim Hotel, Berlin, Germany	
8	Win	8–0	(Bosnia and Herzegovina) Irma Adler	UD	8	6 Apr 2019	(Germany) Ballhaus Forum, Unterschleißheim, German	
7	Win	7–0	(Hungary) Gabriella Busa	UD	10	16 Jun 2018	Ballhaus Forum, Munich, Germany	Won WBC Silver female super-bantamweight title
6	Win	6–0	(Ukraine) Oksana Romanova	UD	6	2 Dec 2017	Stockschützenhalle, Kühbach, Germany	
5	Win	5–0	(Russia) Galina Ivanova	UD	10	25 Feb 2017	Event-Hall, Solnechnyy, Russia	
4	Win	4–0	(Russia) Elena Kuzicheva	UD	6	18 Dec 2016	Balagan City Club, Voronezh, Russia	
3	Win	3–0	(Spain) Mary Romero	UD	6	10 Sep 2016	Event-Hall, Solnechnyy, Russia	
2	Win	2–0	(Russia) Yena Denisova	TKO	3 (6), 0:20	13 Aug 2016	Aura Club, Voronezh, Russia	
1	Win	1–0	(Russia) Olga Zabavina	TKO	4 (4), 1:23	4 Jul 2016	Korston Club, Moscow, Russia	

Sporting positions
World boxing titles
Vacant Title last held by Davinia Perez	WBC female super-bantamweight champion Silver title 16 June 2018 – 2019	Vacant Title next held by Fan Yin
Vacant Title last held by Eva Voraberger	WBC female bantamweight champion Interim title 27 March 2021 – 11 September 2021	Succeeded by Jessica González
