= Miyo Yoshida =

Japanese boxer (born 1988)

Miyo Yoshida 吉田実代
Personal information
- Nickname: Miyo Musashi
- Born: 12 April 1988 (age 38) Kagoshima, Kagoshima Prefecture, Japan
- Height: 5 ft 3 1/2 in (161 cm)
- Weight: Super flyweight; Bantamweight; Super-bantamweight

Boxing career
- Reach: 63 1/2 in (161 cm)
- Stance: Orthodox

Boxing record
- Total fights: 25
- Wins: 19
- Win by KO: 1
- Losses: 6

Miyo Yoshida (吉田実代, Yoshida Miyo, born 12 April 1988) is a Japanese professional boxer. She held the IBF female bantamweight title 2023-2024 and twice the WBO female junior-bantamweight title from 2019-2020 and 2021-2022.

== Boxing career ==
Yoshida made her professional debut on 28 May 2014, scoring a four-round majority decision (MD) over Ayaka Sato at the Korakuen Hall in Tokyo, Japan. Two judges scored the bout 39–37 in favour of Yoshida while the third scored it a draw at 38–38. After winning her first four fights, she suffered the first defeat of her career against Yuki Koseki on 13 March 2016, losing via unanimous decision (UD) over four rounds with scores of 38–39, 37–39 and 36–40.

Yoshida bounced back with three victories before defeating Tomomi Takano by UD over six rounds to capture the inaugural Japanese female bantamweight title, with all three judges scoring the bout 58–57. The bout took place on 6 October 2017 at the Korakuen Hall. After successfully defending the title in March 2018 against Kai Johnson, winning via six-round UD, Yoshida defeated Gretel de Paz on 20 August 2018 at the Korakuen Hall to capture the OPBF female bantamweight title. The fight was stopped in the fifth round after Yoshida was cut from an accidental clash of heads, causing the decision to rest on the scorecards over the five rounds that had been contested. Yoshida won via technical decision (TD) with two judges scoring the bout 49–46 and the third scoring it 48–47.

Following successful defences of her OPBF and Japanese titles in September 2018 and March 2019 respectively, both by UD, Yoshida challenged for her first world title against Casey Morton on 19 June at the Makuhari Messe in Chiba, Japan. Yoshida won the bout via UD (100–90, 100–90, 99–91) to capture the vacant WBO female junior-bantamweight title.

She successfully retained the title with a unanimous decision win over Li Ping Shi at Ota City General Gymnasium in Tokyo on 31 December 2019.

In her second defense, Yoshida lost the title to Tomoko Okuda at EDION Arena in Osaka on 13 December 2020. The fight was stopped in the sixth round due to a cut Okuda suffered after an accidental clash of heads in the previous round was ruled too severe for her to continue. Okuda was ahead on all three ringside judges' scorecards at the point the bout was halted and was therefore awarded the win, and the title, via unanimous technical decision. A rematch took place at Korakuen Hall in Tokyo on 29 June 2021 with Yoshida reclaiming the title by split decision. Two judges scored the fight 96–94 in her favour, while the third had it 96–94 for Okuda.

Again at Korakuen Hall, Yoshida made the first defense of her second title reign against Tamao Ozawa on 30 May 2022. She lost via split decision with the judges' scorecards reading 97–93, 94–96, 94–96.

On 9 December 2023, Yoshida defeated Ebanie Bridges by unanimous decision at Chase Center in San Francisco, California, United States, to win the IBF female bantamweight title.

Yoshida made the first defense of her IBF bantamweight title against Shurretta Metcalf at Madison Square Garden in New York City, United States, on 23 October 2024. She lost the bout by unanimous decision.

Yoshida challenged WBC female super-bantamweight champion Skye Nicolson at College Park Center in Arlington, Texas, United States, on 8 November 2026. She lost via unanimous decision.

== Professional boxing record ==
25 fights	19 wins	6 losses
By knockout	1	0
By decision	18	6

No.	Result	Record	Opponent	Type	Round, time	Date	Location	Notes
25	Loss	19–6	Skye Nicolson	UD	10	8 Nov 2026	College Park Center, Arlington, Texas, U.S.	For WBC female super-bantamweight title
24	Win	19–5	Edith de Jesus Flores	RTD	6 (8), 2:00	25 Apr 2025	Haverhill High School, Haverhill, Massachusetts, U.S.	
23	Win	18–5	Beáta Dudek	UD	8	1 Feb 2025	Prudential Center, Newark, New Jersey, U.S.	
22	Loss	17–5	Shurretta Metcalf	UD	10	23 Oct 2024	Madison Square Garden Theater, Manhattan, New York, U.S.	Lost IBF female bantamweight title
21	Win	17–4	Ebanie Bridges	UD	10	9 Dec 2023	Chase Center, San Francisco, California, U.S.	Won IBF female bantamweight title
20	Loss	16–4	Shurretta Metcalf	UD	10	7 Nov 2023	Edison Theatre, Manhattan, New York, U.S.	For vacant IBF Inter-continental female bantamweight title
19	Win	16–3	Indeya Smith	MD	8	27 Apr 2023	Sony Hall, Manhattan, New York, U.S.	
18	Loss	15–3	Tamao Ozawa	SD	10	30 May 2022	Korakuen Hall, Tokyo, Japan	Lost WBO female junior-bantamweight title
17	Win	15–2	Tomoko Okuda	SD	10	29 Jun 2021	Korakuen Hall, Tokyo, Japan	Won WBO female junior-bantamweight title
16	Loss	14–2	Tomoko Okuda	TD	6 (10), 1:38	13 Dec 2020	EDION Arena, Osaka, Japan	Lost WBO junior-bantamweight title
15	Win	14–1	Li Ping Shi	UD	10	31 Dec 2019	Ota City General Gymnasium, Tokyo, Japan	Retained WBO junior-bantamweight title
14	Win	13–1	Casey Morton	UD	10	19 Jun 2019	Makuhari Messe, Chiba, Japan	Won vacant WBO junior-bantamweight title
13	Win	12–1	Yoshie Wakasa	UD	6	13 Mar 2019	Korakuen Hall, Tokyo, Japan	Retained Japanese female bantamweight title
12	Win	11–1	Phannaluk Kongsang	UD	8	30 Sep 2018	Kagoshima Arena, Kagoshima, Japan	Retained OPBF female bantamweight title
11	Win	10–1	Gretel de Paz	TD	5 (8), 1:39	20 Aug 2018	Korakuen Hall, Tokyo, Japan	Won vacant OPBF female bantamweight title; Fight stopped after Yoshida cut from accidental clash of heads
10	Win	9–1	Kai Johnson	UD	6	8 Mar 2018	Korakuen Hall, Tokyo, Japan	Retained Japanese female bantamweight title
9	Win	8–1	Tomomi Takano	UD	6	6 Oct 2017	Korakuen Hall, Tokyo, Japan	Won inaugural Japanese female bantamweight title
8	Win	7–1	Kim Actub	UD	8	14 May 2017	Kagoshima Arena, Kagoshima, Japan	
7	Win	6–1	Yuki Koseki	MD	6	15 Mar 2017	Korakuen Hall, Tokyo, Japan	
6	Win	5–1	Kana Fukuda	UD	6	27 Nov 2016	City Bunka Hall, Kagoshima, Japan	
5	Loss	4–1	Yuki Koseki	UD	4	21 Sep 2016	Korakuen Hall, Tokyo, Japan	
4	Win	4–0	Chisa Tanaka	UD	4	2 Jul 2016	Yano Fitness Center, Zama, Japan	
3	Win	3–0	Kana Makino	UD	4	31 May 2016	Korakuen Hall, Tokyo Japan	
2	Win	2–0	Yuko Henzan	MD	4	13 Mar 2016	City Gym, Tomigusuku, Japan	
1	Win	1–0	Akaya Sato	MD	4	28 May 2014	Korakuen Hall, Tokyo, Japan	

== Kickboxing record ==
Professional kickboxing and shoot boxing record
11 wins (2 (T)KO's), 4 losses
Date	Result	Opponent	Event	Location	Method	Round	Time
2025-11-02	Win	(Japan) Mikity	RISE World Series 2025 Final	Tokyo, Japan	Decision (Unanimous)	3	3:00
2013-12-20	Win	(Cambodia) Soy Sothear	Titan Fight Samurai vs Khmer	Bavet, Cambodia	Decision	5	2:00
2013-11-16	Loss	(Japan) Ai Takahashi	Shoot Boxing Battle Summit: Ground Zero Tokyo 2013	Tokyo, Japan	Decision (Unanimous)	3	3:00
2013-09-01	Win	(South Korea) Jan Eun Jong	GLADIATOR in Kagoshima 2013	Kagoshima, Japan	TKO	2	
Wins inaugural GLADIATOR Featherweight Championship.
2013-08-03	Loss	(Japan) Mizuki Inoue	2013 Shoot Boxing Girls S-Cup, Semi-Final	Tokyo, Japan	Decision (Unanimous)	3	2:00
2013-08-03	Win	(Japan) Kanako Oka	2013 Shoot Boxing Girls S-Cup, Quarter-Final	Tokyo, Japan	Decision (Unanimous)	3	2:00
2013-04-20	Loss	(Netherlands) Lorena Klijn	SHOOT BOXING 2013 act.2	Tokyo, Japan	Decision (Majority)	3	3:00
2013-02-22	Win	(South Korea) Yu Hi Jin	SHOOT BOXING 2013 act.1	Tokyo, Japan	TKO (Corner stoppage)	1	0:41
2012-11-18	Win	(Japan) Satoko Ozawa	J-GIRLS 2012 ～Platinum's In The Ring FINAL～	Tokyo, Japan	Decision (Unanimous)	3	2:00
2012-04-01	Win	(Japan) Ruri Shiraishi	J-GIRLS 2012 ～Platinum's In The Ring 2nd～	Tokyo, Japan	Decision (Unanimous)	3	2:00
2011-10-30	Win	(Brazil) Caro	GLADIATOR 25	Tokyo, Japan	Decision (Unanimous)	3	3:00
2011-08-19	Loss	(Japan) Erika Kamimura	2011 Shoot Boxing Girls S-Cup, Semi-Final	Tokyo, Japan	TKO (2 Knockdowns/Left hook)	1	0:50
2011-08-19	Win	(Japan) WINDY Tomomi	2011 Shoot Boxing Girls S-Cup, Quarter-Final	Tokyo, Japan	Decision (Majority)	3	2:00
2011-06-05	Win	(Japan) NATSUKA	SHOOT BOXING 2011 act.3	Tokyo, Japan	Decision (Unanimous)	3	2:00
2011-04-23	Win	(Japan) Asuka Inoue	SHOOT BOXING 2011 act.2	Tokyo, Japan	Decision (Unanimous)	3	2:00
Legend: Win Loss Draw/No contest Notes

== Mixed martial arts record ==
Professional record breakdown
3 matches	1 win	2 losses
By knockout	1	0
By decision	0	2

Res.	Record	Opponent	Method	Event	Date	Round	Time	Location	Notes
Loss	1–2	Mai Ichii	Decision (unanimous)	Jewels: 10th Ring	October 10, 2010	2	5:00	Tokyo, Japan	
Win	1–1	Yoko Kagoshima	KO (punches)	Jewels: 8th Ring	May 23, 2010	1	3:30	Tokyo, Japan	
Loss	0–1	Yuko Oya	Decision (majority)	Deep: Fan Thanksgiving Festival 2	November 10, 2009	2	5:00	Tokyo, Japan	Strawweight debut

== See also ==
- List of female boxers

Sporting positions
Regional boxing titles
New title	Japanese female bantamweight champion October 6, 2017 – June 19, 2019; Won world title	Vacant Title next held by Tomoko Okuda
Vacant Title last held by Yuko Henzan	OBPF female bantamweight champion August 20, 2018 – June 19, 2019; Won world title	Vacant Title next held by Tomoko Okuda
World boxing titles
Vacant Title last held by Amanda Serrano	WBO female super-flyweight champion June 19, 2019 – December 13, 2020	Succeeded by Tomoko Okuda
Preceded by Tomoko Okuda	WBO female super-flyweight champion June 29, 2021 – May 30, 2022	Succeeded by Tamao Ozawa
Preceded by Ebanie Bridges	IBF female bantamweight champion December 9, 2023 – October 23, 2024	Succeeded by Shurretta Metcalf
