= Dina Thorslund =

Danish boxer (born 1993)

Personal information
- Born: 14 October 1993 (age 32) Copenhagen, Denmark
- Height: 5 ft 4 in (163 cm)
- Weight: Bantamweight; Super bantamweight; Featherweight

Boxing career
- Stance: Orthodox

Boxing record
- Total fights: 25
- Wins: 25
- Win by KO: 9

Dina Thorslund (born 14 October 1993) is a Danish professional boxer. She has been undisputed female bantamweight champion since August 2026. Thorslund previously held the unified World Boxing Council (WBC), World Boxing Organization (WBO), and Ring magazine female bantamweight titles from 2021 to 2025 and the WBO female super-bantamweight title from 2018 to 2021.

== Professional career ==
Thorslund made her professional debut against Czech Petra Podráská on 28 February 2015 at the Boxsporthalle Braamkamp in Hamburg. Thorslund won the fight via first-round technical knockout.

On 10 March 2018, she defeated Alicia Ashley for the WBC interim female super-bantamweight title in Struer, Denmark, winning by unanimous decision.

Thorslund won the vacant WBO female super-bantamweight title, defeating Mexican Jessica Arreguín by unanimous decision on 25 August 2018 at the Struer Arena.

After making three successful defences of her title, Thorslund switched weight divisions to claim the vacant WBO female World bantamweight crown with a unanimous decision win over Jasseth Noriega on 25 June 2021.

Three successful defences followed before, on 1 September 2023, she added the WBC female World bantamweight title as well as the inaugural Ring female bantamweight title to her collection by defeating Yulihan Luna via unanimous decision.

She defended all three belts for the first time on 24 February 2024, when she secured an eighth-round stoppage win against Spain's Mary Romero who had accepted the fight on two days' notice. Thorslund had originally been scheduled to face Turkish boxer Seren Cetin but the challenger was ruled unfit to fight due to a fresh cut by her left eye that had been closed by six stitches.

Thorslund and Cetin eventually met on 25 May 2024, with the Dane retaining her titles thanks to a unanimous decision win at the Royal Arena, Copenhagen, Denmark. Two ringside judges scored the fight 100–90 with the third giving it 99–91.

She defended her titles again on 25 October 2024, securing a unanimous decision win over Terumi Nuki at Graakjaer Arena, Holstebro, Denmark, with all three judges awarding her the fight 99–91.

On 26 March 2025 it was announced that Thorslund signed with Most Valuable Promotions.

Thorslund vacated her titles in June 2025 after announcing she was pregnant with her second child. She had been scheduled to face IBF champion Shurretta Metcalf in an unification contest on 11 July 2025.

Having suffered a miscarriage, Thorslund returned to the competitive boxing ring against Almudena Álvarez at Sydbank Arena in Kolding, Denmark, on 31 January 2026, with the vacant WBC interim female featherweight title on the line. She won via unanimous decision.

Thorslund challenged undisputed female bantamweight world champion Cherneka Johnson at Caribe Royale in Orlando, Florida, USA, on 8 August 2026. She won by unanimous decision.

== Professional boxing record ==
25 fights	25 wins	0 losses
By knockout	9	0
By decision	16	0

No.	Result	Record	Opponent	Type	Round, time	Date	Location	Notes
25	Win	25–0	Cherneka Johnson	UD	10	8 Aug 2026	Caribe Royale, Orlando, Florida, U.S.	Retained The Ring female bantamweight title; Won WBA, WBC, WBO and IBF female bantamweight titles
24	Win	24–0	Almudena Álvarez	UD	10	31 Jan 2026	Sydbank Arena, Kolding, Denmark	Won vacant WBC interim female featherweight title
23	Win	23–0	Terumi Nuki	UD	10	25 Oct 2024	Graakjaer Arena, Holstebro, Denmark	Retained WBC, WBO and The Ring female bantamweight titles
22	Win	22–0	Seren Cetin	UD	10	25 May 2024	Royal Arena, København, Denmark	Retained WBC, WBO, and The Ring female bantamweight titles
21	Win	21–0	Mary Romero	TKO	8 (10) 1:26	24 Feb 2024	Royal Arena, København, Denmark	Retained WBC, WBO and The Ring female bantamweight titles
20	Win	20–0	Yulihan Luna	UD	10	1 Sep 2023	Gråkjær Arena, Holstebro, Denmark	Retained WBO bantamweight title; Won WBC and vacant The Ring female bantamweight titles
19	Win	19–0	Débora Anahí López	TKO	8 (10), 1:12	25 Feb 2023	Gråkjær Arena, Holstebro, Denmark	Retained WBO female bantamweight title
18	Win	18–0	Niorkis Carreno	UD	10	9 Apr 2022	Gråkjær Arena, Holstebro, Denmark	Retained WBO female bantamweight title
17	Win	17–0	Zulina Muñoz	KO	7 (10), 1:14	13 Nov 2021	Sydbank Arena, Kolding, Denmark	Retained WBO female bantamweight title
16	Win	16–0	Jasseth Noriega	UD	10	25 Jun 2021	Struer Arena, Struer, Denmark	Won vacant WBO female bantamweight title
15	Win	15-0	Nina Radovanovic	UD	10	26 Sep 2020	Struer Arena, Struer, Denmark	Retained WBO female super-bantamweight title
14	Win	14–0	April Adams	UD	10	22 Jun 2019	Forum, Horsens, Denmark	Retained WBO female super-bantamweight title
13	Win	13–0	Alesia Graf	UD	10	19 Jan 2019	Struer Arena, Struer, Denmark	Retained WBO female super-bantamweight title
12	Win	12–0	Jessica Arreguín	UD	10	25 Aug 2018	Struer Arena, Struer, Denmark	Won vacant WBO female super-bantamweight title
11	Win	11–0	Alicia Ashley	UD	10	10 Mar 2018	Struer Arena, Struer, Denmark	Won WBC interim female super-bantamweight title
10	Win	10–0	Nevenka Mikulic	UD	8	27 Oct 2017	Sport- und Kongresshalle, Schwerin, Germany	
9	Win	9–0	Gabriella Mezei	KO	1 (10), 0:36	18 Mar 2017	Ceres Arena, Aarhus, Denmark	Won vacant European female super-bantamweight title
8	Win	8–0	Xenia Jorneac	UD	10	21 Jan 2017	Struer Arena, Struer, Denmark	Won vacant WBC Youth female super-bantamweight title
7	Win	7–0	Oksana Romanova	TKO	7 (10), 1:36	15 Oct 2016	Arena Nord, Frederikshavn, Denmark	
6	Win	6–0	Sopio Putkaradze	KO	1 (8), 1:05	19 Mar 2016	MusikTeatret, Copenhagen, Denmark	
5	Win	5–0	Jasmina Nad	UD	6	12 Dec 2015	Brondby Hallen, Brondby, Denmark	
4	Win	4–0	Danuta Kruczek	TKO	1 (4), 0:27	31 Oct 2015	Universum Gym, Hamburg, Germany	
3	Win	3–0	Jasna Curcin	TKO	1 (6), 1:15	29 May 2015	The Black Box, Holstebro, Denmark	
2	Win	2–0	Bojana Libiszewska	UD	6	25 Apr 2015	Hornslet Idraets & Kulturcenter, Hornslet, Denmark	
1	Win	1–0	Petra Podráská	TKO	1 (4), 0:30	28 Feb 2015	Boxsporthalle Braamkamp, Hamburg, Germany	

== Personal life ==
Thorslund has a son born in 2014.

== See also ==
- List of female boxers

Sporting positions
Regional boxing titles
Vacant Title last held by Jessica Belder	EBU female super-bantamweight champion March 18, 2017 – 2018; Vacated	Vacant Title next held by Mary Romero
World boxing titles
Vacant Title last held by Jackie Nava	WBC female super-bantamweight champion Interim title March 10, 2018 – 2019; Vacated	Vacant Title next held by Rachel Ball
Vacant Title last held by Amanda Serrano	WBO female super-bantamweight champion August 25, 2018 – 2021; Vacated	Vacant Title next held by Ségolène Lefebvre
Vacant Title last held by Daniela Romina Bermúdez	WBO female bantamweight champion June 25, 2021 – June 6, 2025; Vacated	Vacant Title next held by Cherneka Johnson
Preceded by Yulihan Luna	WBC female bantamweight champion September 1, 2023 – June 6, 2025; Vacated	Vacant Title next held by Cherneka Johnson
Inaugural champion	The Ring female bantamweight champion September 1, 2023 – present	Incumbent
Vacant Title last held by Skye Nicolson	WBC female featherweight champion Interim title January 31, 2026 – present	Incumbent
Preceded by Cherneka Johnson	WBA female bantamweight champion 12 May 2024 – present	Incumbent
Preceded by Cherneka Johnson	WBC female bantamweight champion August 8, 2026 – present	Incumbent
Preceded by Cherneka Johnson	IBF female bantamweight champion August 8, 2026 – present	Incumbent
Preceded by Cherneka Johnson	WBO female bantamweight champion August 8, 2026 – present	Incumbent
Preceded by Cherneka Johnson	Undisputed female bantamweight champion August 8, 2026 – present	Incumbent
