= South Padre Island Convention Centre =

Convention facility in South Padre Island, Texas

- Rear Patio of the convention center
- Interactive map of South Padre Island Convention Centre
- Address: 7355 Padre Boulevard
- Location: South Padre Island, Texas 78597
- Coordinates: 26°8′26″N 97°10′30″W
- Owner: City of South Padre Island
- Operator: McCarter Family

Construction
- Opened: 1990
- Renovated: 2012

The South Padre Island Convention Centre is a 45,000-square-foot (4,200 m^{2}) facility located in downtown South Padre Island, Texas. It can accommodate groups from 20 to 2,500 in size. It hosts the annual South Padre Island Invitational, a college basketball tournament, and is the host for the 2011 NBA G-League Showcase.

== Notable events ==
Notable entertainment events from this venue includes Miss USA and Miss Teen USA pageants which is held for three occasions each respectively.

The 2016 South Padre Island kite festival was held here.

Jake Paul's Most Valuable Promotions were scheduled to host their Prospect 16 card from Convention Centre on October 18, 2025 with DAZN streaming the event.

== Gallery ==
Rear

Walkway

== See also ==
- South Padre Island, Texas
