= Shurretta Metcalf =

American boxer (born 1984)

Personal information
- Nickname: Chiccn
- Born: October 28, 1984 (age 41) Dallas, Texas, U.S.
- Height: 5 ft 7 in (170 cm)
- Weight: Super flyweight; Bantamweight

Boxing career
- Stance: Orthodox

Boxing record
- Total fights: 22
- Wins: 14
- Win by KO: 2
- Losses: 6
- Draws: 1
- No contests: 1

Shurretta Metcalf (born October 28, 1984) is an American professional boxer. She is a former IBF female bantamweight champion.

== Early life ==
Metcalf was born in Dallas, Texas on October 28, 1984. She had fought in underground street fights prior to her professional boxing career.

== Professional career ==
Metcalf made her professional debut on January 16, 2016, where she lost a four-round unanimous decision (UD) bout to Samantha Salazar at the Gas Monkey Bar N' Grill in Dallas, Texas.

Metcalf faced Melissa Oddessa Parker on July 29, 2023, winning the bout by majority decision. Metcalf faced Miyo Yoshida for vacant IBF Inter-continental female bantamweight title on November 7, 2023. She won the bout by unanimous decision to capture the vacant title.

=== IBF bantamweight champion ===
==== Yoshida vs. Metcalf ====
Metcalf faced Miyo Yoshida in a rematch, this time for the IBF female bantamweight title in New York City on October 23, 2024. She won the bout by unanimous decision to win the world title.

==== Metcalf vs. Johnson ====
Holding the IBF bantamweight title, Metcalf was scheduled to face WBC, WBO and Ring champion Dina Thorslund in a championship unification bout on 11 July 2025, at Madison Square Garden in New York. After the latter withdrew due to pregnancy and vacated her belts, she was replaced by WBA champion Cherneka Johnson, with the fight elevated to an undisputed championship. Metcalf lost by stoppage in the ninth round.

On 8 August 2026, Metcalf lost to Amanda Galle via unanimous decision over eight rounds at Caribe Royale in Orlando, Florida, USA.

== Personal life ==
Metcalf is the mother of two sons.

== Professional boxing record ==
22 fights	14 wins	6 losses
By knockout	2	1
By decision	12	5
Draws	1	
No contests	1	

No.	Result	Record	Opponent	Type	Round, time	Date	Location	Notes
22	Loss	14–6–1 (1)	Amanda Galle	UD	8	8 Aug 2026	Caribe Royale, Orlando, Florida, U.S	
21	Loss	14–5–1 (1)	Cherneka Johnson	TKO	9 (10), 0:02	11 Jul 2025	Madison Square Garden, New York City, New York, U.S.	Lost IBF female bantamweight title; For WBA and vacant WBC, WBO, and The Ring female bantamweight titles
20	Win	14–4–1 (1)	Miyo Yoshida	UD	10	Oct 23, 2024	Madison Square Garden, Manhattan, New York, U.S.	Won IBF female bantamweight title
19	Yes	13–4–1 (1)	Miyo Yoshida	UD	10	Nov 7, 2023	Edison Theatre, Manhattan, New York, U.S.	Won vacant IBF Inter-continental female bantamweight title
18	Yes	12–4–1 (1)	Melissa Oddessa Parker	MD	8	Jul 29, 2023	Riders Field, Frisco, Texas, U.S.	
17	Yes	11–4–1 (1)	Leanne Calderon	UD	6	Nov 26, 2022	The Bomb Factory, Dallas, Texas, U.S.	
16	NC	10–4–1 (1)	Alicia Acero	NC	6	Jul 23, 2022	Gilley's Dallas, Dallas, Texas, U.S.	
15	Loss	10–4–1	Danielle Bennett	MD	8	May 14, 2022	The Bomb Factory, Dallas, Texas, U.S.	For the vacant NABF super bantamweight title
14	Win	10–3–1	Karen Dulin	MD	6	Feb 19, 2022	Gilley's Dallas, Dallas, Texas, U.S.	
13	Win	9–3–1	Britain Hart	SD	4	Feb 28, 2020	Southern Junction, Irving, Texas, U.S.	
12	Win	8–3–1	Carla Torres	MD	6	Sep 28, 2019	Southern Junction, Irving, Texas, U.S.	
11	Win	7–3–1	Karen Dulin	UD	6	Jul 13, 2019	Southern Junction, Irving, Texas, U.S.	
10	Win	6–3–1	Mikayla Nebel	SD	4	Apr 25, 2019	Sam's Town Hotel and Gambling Hall, Sunrise Manor, Nevada, U.S.	
9	Win	5–3–1	Kay Hansen	UD	4	Mar 15, 2019	Southern Junction, Irving, Texas, U.S.	
8	Win	4–3–1	Mistery Neal	UD	4	Aug 4, 2018	River Ranch Texas Horse Park, Dallas, Texas, U.S.	
7	Draw	3–3–1	Jamie Mitchell	SD	4	Feb 22, 2018	Frontiers of Flight Museum, Dallas, Texas, U.S.	
6	Win	3–3	Ashley Garza	TKO	1 (4), 0:36	Oct 26, 2017	Shreveport, Louisiana, U.S.	
5	Loss	2–3	Ayanna Vasquez	UD	4	Aug 5, 2017	Convention Center, Waco, Texas, U.S.	
4	Win	2–2	Brittany Ordonez	MD	4	Jun 10, 2017	Event Center, San Antonio, Texas, U.S.	
3	Loss	1–2	Iris Contreras	SD	4	Apr 8, 2017	Richmond Memorial Auditorium, Richmond, California, U.S.	
2	Win	1–1	Colby Fletcher	TKO	2 (4), 0:54	May 24, 2016	Texas Theatre, Dallas, Texas, U.S.	
1	Loss	0–1	Samantha Salazar	UD	4	Jan 16, 2016	Gas Monkey Bar N' Grill, Dallas, Texas, U.S.	
