= Amanda Galle =

Canadian boxer (born 1989)

Personal information
- Nationality: Canadian
- Born: 27 April 1989 (age 37) Mississauga, Ontario, Canada
- Height: 160 cm (5 ft 3 in)
- Weight: Bantamweight

Boxing career
- Stance: Orthodox

Boxing record
- Total fights: 14
- Wins: 13
- Win by KO: 1
- Losses: 1
- Draws: 1

Amanda Galle (born 27 April 1989) is a Canadian professional boxer. She is a former IBO female bantamweight champion.

== Professional boxing career ==
A three-time national amateur champion and four-time Ringside World Amateur Boxing Champion, Galle made her professional boxing debut at The Mattamy Events Center in Toronto on 29 March 2019, defeating Mexico's Perla Esmeralda Rojas by unanimous decision in a four-round contest.

In her sixth pro-fight she won the vacant Canadian female super-bantamweight title with a unanimous decision victory against Tania Walters on 13 March 2022, at the Rebel Entertainment Complex in Toronto.

Galle signed a co-promotional deal with International Boxing Hall of Fame member Lou DiBella and Toronto-based promoter, Lee Baxter, in March 2021.

At the same venue where she had won her Canadian title 21 months earlier, Galle became the IBO female bantamweight champion on 10 December 2023, by beating Niorkis Carreno from Venezuela via unanimous decision to claim the vacant title.

In June 2025, Galle signed a promotional contract with Jake Paul led Most Valuable Promotions.

Galle was scheduled to challenge undisputed female bantamweight world champion Cherneka Johnson at the Kaseya Center in Miami, Florida, on the undercard of the Jake Paul vs. Gervonta Davis fight on 14 November 2025. However, the event was cancelled less than two weeks before it was set to take place due Davis' legal issues. The contest was rescheduled to take place at the same venue on 19 December 2025 as part of the undercard of the Jake Paul vs. Anthony Joshua fight. Galle lost by unanimous decision to suffer her first defeat as a professional.

On 8 August 2026, Galle defeated Shurretta Metcalf via unanimous decision over eight rounds at Caribe Royale in Orlando, Florida, USA.

== Personal life ==
Galle is an active supporter of the Princess Margaret Cancer Foundation taking part in the Fight to End Cancer initiative in honour of her late mother, Nicolina.

== Professional boxing record ==
15 fights	13 wins	1 loss
By knockout	1	0
By decision	12	1
Draws	1	

No.	Result	Record	Opponent	Type	Round, time	Date	Location	Notes
15	Win	13–1–1	Shurretta Metcalf	UD	8	8 Aug 2026	Caribe Royale, Orlando, Florida, U.S	
14	Loss	12–1–1	Cherneka Johnson	UD	10	19 Dec 2025	Kaseya Center, Miami, Florida, U.S.	For WBA, IBF, WBC, WBO and The Ring female bantamweight titles
13	Win	12–0–1	Alondra Yamile Hernandez Mendoza	UD	8	27 Sep 2025	Théâtre Saint-Denis, Montreal, Canada	
12	Win	11–0–1	Niorkis Carreno	MD	10	8 Dec 2024	Rebel Entertainment Complex, Toronto, Canada	Retained IBO female bantamweight World title
11	Win	10–0–1	Edith de Jesus Flores	UD	8	1 Jun 2024	Niagara Falls Convention Centre, Niagara Falls, Ontario, Canada	
10	Win	9–0–1	Niorkis Carreno	UD	10	10 Dec 2023	Rebel Entertainment Complex, Toronto, Canada	Won the vacant IBO female bantamweight World title
9	Win	8–0–1	Lorena Cruz Aispuro	UD	8	16 Mar 2023	Place Bell, Laval, Quebec, Canada	
8	Win	7–0–1	Luz Elena Martinez	TKO	2 (8)	18 Dec 2022	Rebel Entertainment Complex, Toronto, Canada	
7	Draw	6–0–1	Jaqueline Mucio Munoz	SD	8	21 Jul 2022	Rebel Entertainment Complex, Toronto, Canada	
6	Win	6–0	Tania Walters	UD	8	13 Mar 2022	Rebel Entertainment Complex, Toronto, Canada	Won the vacant Canadian female super-bantamweight title
5	Win	5–0	Jaica Pavilus	UD	6	11 Nov 2021	Paramount Theatre, Huntington, New York, USA	
4	Win	4–0	Shelly Barnett	UD	8	28 Jan 2020	The Danforth Music Hall, Toronto, Canada	
3	Win	3–0	Daniela Ortiz	UD	4	29 Jun 2019	Scotiabank Convention Centre, Niagara Falls, Canada	
2	Win	2–0	Margarita Angeles	UD	4	11 May 2019	Vogue Theatre, Vancouver, Canada	
1	Win	1–0	Perla Esmeralda Rojas	UD	4	29 Mar 2019	The Mattamy Events Center, Toronto, Canada	
