= Donn Davis =

Founder of PFL

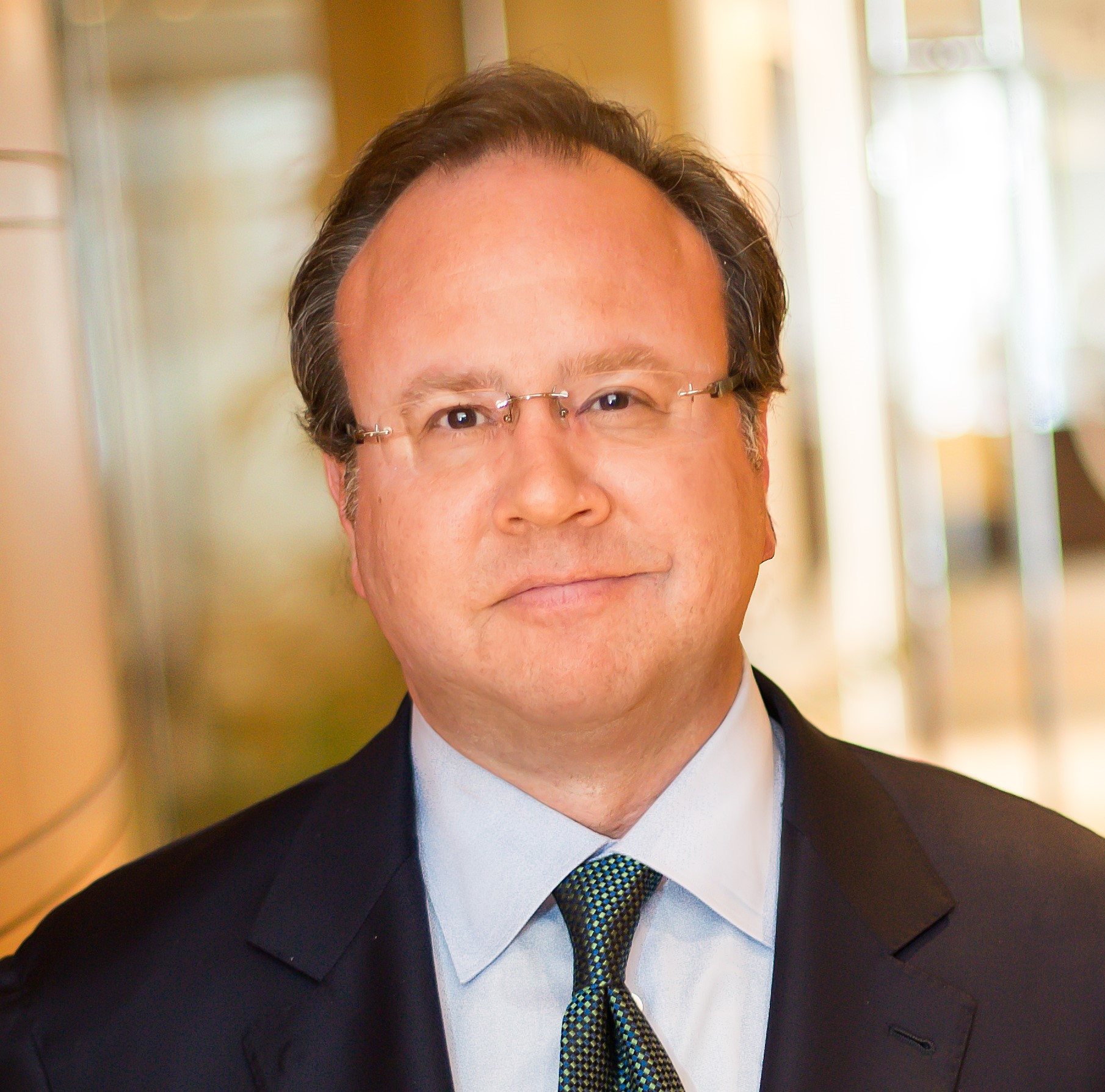
- Education: Miami University; University of Michigan Law School
- Occupations: Entrepreneur; Venture capitalist
- Known for: Founder, chairman and co-owner, Professional Fighters League

Donn Davis is an American venture capitalist and entrepreneur. He is the founder and co-owner of the Professional Fighters League, co-owner of e-sports team Team Liquid and founding partner of the investment firm Revolution LLC.

== Career ==
After graduating Miami University in Oxford, Ohio, in 1985 and University of Michigan Law School in 1988, Davis went to work for Chicago-based law firm Sidley Austin. In 1992, he joined Tribune Media as senior counsel in the law department, handling acquisitions and transactions. At the age of 29, Davis became chief counsel to the Chicago Cubs baseball team, becoming the youngest team attorney in Major League Baseball. In 1995, Davis co-founded and became president of Tribune Media's new investment arm, called Tribune Ventures.

In 1998, Davis joined America Online as senior vice president of corporate development and was subsequently appointed president/COO of the AOL Interactive Properties Group, where he led the internet brands and businesses of AOL. In 2005, Davis and AOL co-founder Steve Case launched venture capital firm Revolution LLC, based in Washington, DC, which—as of March 2022—has invested more than $1.5 billion, including notable early investments in Scopely, Zipcar, DraftKings, Sportradar, CLEAR and BigCommerce.

In 2003, Davis and Case purchased the Miraval Resort and Spa in Tucson, Arizona. In 2004, Davis and Case acquired the majority stake of start-up Exclusive Resorts, and Davis served as CEO of the company from 2005 to 2008. In 2016, Davis, Ted Leonsis and Peter Guber led an investment group that acquired majority ownership of esports team Team Liquid, which has twice won ESPN’s e-sports Team of the Year.

In 2017, Davis created and launched a new mixed martial arts company called the Professional Fighters League, which presents MMA in a sports-season format and is broadcast in 160 countries. Davis has since raised $175 million of total capital for the league, including a $65 million financing round in February 2021 with investors Legends Hospitality, Elysian Park Ventures, Knighthead and Ares Management. In January 2026 Davis announced that he was stepping down as chairman of PFL.

== Personal life ==
Davis married Sharon Bowden in 1994. They have three children and reside in Great Falls, Virginia.
