= Tomoko Okuda =

Japanese boxer (born 1983)

Personal information
- Nationality: Japanese
- Born: April 21, 1983 (age 43) Kakamigahara, Gifu, Japan
- Height: 5 ft 5 1/2 in (166 cm)
- Weight: Super-flyweight; Bantamweight

Boxing career
- Stance: Orthodox

Boxing record
- Total fights: 18
- Wins: 8
- Win by KO: 2
- Losses: 8
- Draws: 2

Tomoko Okuda (奥田朋子, Okuda Tomoko) (born 21 April 1983) is a Japanese professional boxer who held the WBO female junior-bantamweight title from December 2020 until June 2021. At regional level she held the OPBF and Japanese female bantamweight titles in 2020.

== Professional career ==
After compiling a record of 6–2–2 (1 KO), Okuda challenged WBO female junior-bantamweight champion Miyo Yoshida at the EDION Arena in Osaka on 13 December 2020. She suffered a cut above her right eye in the fifth round due to an accidental clash of heads. After the cut worsened in the sixth round, the referee called a halt to the contest, forcing the decision to rely on the judges' scorecards. Two judges scored the bout 59–54 and the third scored it 57–56, all in favour of Okuda, handing her the win, and the title, via technical decision. A rematch took place at Korakuen Hall in Tokyo on 29 June 2021 with Okuda losing by split decision. Two judges scored the fight 96–94 for Yoshida, while the third had it 96–94 for Okuda.

== Professional boxing record ==
18 fights	7 wins	9 losses
By knockout	2	3
By decision	5	6
Draws	2	

No.	Result	Record	Opponent	Type	Round, time	Date	Location	Notes
18	Loss	8–8–2	(Japan) Mika Yagio	TKO	5 (6), 1:26	15 Oct 2025	Korakuen Hall, Tokyo, Japan	
17	Loss	8–7–2	(Mexico) Gabriela Sanchez Saavedra	UD	10	18 Oct 2024	Puebla, Mexico	
16	Loss	8–6–2	(Japan) Chaoz Minowa	TKO	1 (8), 1:43	14 Jun 2024	Korakuen Hall, Tokyo, Japan	For vacant WBO Asia Pacific female super-flyweight title
15	Win	8–5–2	(Thailand) Jittamat Phomta	TKO	2 (8), 1:01	24 Dec 2023	Sofia Sakai, Osaka, Japan	
14	Loss	7–5–2	(Japan) Chaoz Minowa	MD	8	30 Mar 2023	Korakuen Hall, Tokyo, Japan	
13	Loss	7–4–2	(Australia) Susie Ramadan	UD	8	20 Aug 2022	The Melbourne Pavilion, Flemington, Victoria, Australia	
12	Loss	7–3–2	(Japan) Miyo Yoshida	SD	10	29 Jun 2021	Korakuen Hall, Tokyo, Japan	Lost WBO female junior-bantamweight title
11	Win	7–2–2	(Japan) Miyo Yoshida	TD	6 (10), 1:38	13 Dec 2020	Osaka Prefectural Gymnasium, Osaka, Japan	Won WBO female junior-bantamweight title
10	Win	6–2–2	(Japan) Kanako Taniyama	TD	7 (8), 0:47	28 Jan 2020	Korakuen Hall, Tokyo, Japan	Won vacant Japanese and OPBF female bantamweight titles
9	Draw	5–2–2	(Japan) Kanako Taniyama	MD	8	16 Sep 2019	Ohama Gym, Sakai, Japan	For vacant Japanese and OPBF female bantamweight titles
8	Win	5–2–1	(Thailand) Anchalee Mankong	TKO	3 (6), 1:52	24 Dec 2018	Sangyo Shinko, Sakai, Japan	
7	Loss	4–2–1	(Japan) Yoshie Wakasa	SD	6	20 Aug 2018	Korakuen Hall, Tokyo, Japan	
6	Draw	4–1–1	(Japan) Tomo Hayashi	MD	6	9 Dec 2017	Sangyo Shinko Center, Sakai, Japan	
5	Win	4–1	(Japan) Aya Morita	UD	4	4 Jun 2017	Sangyo Shinko Center, Sakai, Japan	
4	Win	3–1	(Japan) Miki Mitsuda	UD	4	18 Dec 2016	Mielparque Hall, Osaka, Japan	
3	Win	2–1	(Japan) Miki Mitsuda	MD	4	20 Jul 2016	Osaka Prefectural Gymnasium, Osaka, Japan	
2	Win	1–1	(Japan) Ayako Inamori	UD	4	6 Dec 2015	Sambo Hall, Kobe, Japan	
1	Loss	0–1	(Japan) Wakako Fujiwara	KO	4 (4), 0:19	5 Apr 2015	Osaka Prefectural Gymnasium, Osaka, Japan	

Sporting positions
Regional boxing titles
Vacant Title last held by Miyo Yoshida	Japanese female bantamweight champion 28 January 2020 – 13 December 2020; Won world title	Vacant Title next held by Kanako Taniyama
Vacant Title last held by Miyo Yoshida	OPBF female bantamweight champion 28 January 2020 – 13 December 2020; Won world title	Vacant
World boxing titles
Preceded by Miyo Yoshida	WBO female junior-bantamweight champion 13 December 2020 – 29 June 2021	Succeeded by Miyo Yoshida
