= Mary Romero (boxer) =

Spanish boxer (born 1985)

Personal information
- Nationality: Spanish
- Born: María del Carmen Romero Molina; 1 August 1985 (age 40) Puerto Lumbreras, Murcia, Spain
- Height: 5 ft 5 in (165 cm)
- Weight: Super-bantamweight

Boxing career
- Stance: Orthodox

Boxing record
- Total fights: 15
- Wins: 10
- Win by KO: 2
- Losses: 5

María del Carmen Romero Molina (born 1 August 1985) is a Spanish professional boxer who is a former European female super-bantamweight champion.

== Personal life ==
Born in Puerto Lumbreras on 1 August 1985, Romero has been involved in combat sports from an early age, practicing Kung Fu, kickboxing, and Muay Thai before entering a boxing ring in her early 20s. A mother of two boys, Romero works as a security guard and teaches combat sports to children.

== Professional career ==
Romero suffered defeat in her professional debut, losing via six-round unanimous decision (UD) to Melania Sorroche on 22 November 2015, at the Pavelló d'Esports El Pujolet in Manresa, Spain.

After compiling a record of 3–2 (0 KOs), she defeated Jessica Sanchez via UD on 15 June 2019, capturing the vacant Spanish female super-bantamweight title at the Plaza Adolfo Suárez in Alcantarilla, Spain.

Two fights later she faced Ivanka Ivanova for the vacant European female super-bantamweight title on 18 January 2020, at the Centro Multiusos El Esparragal in Puerto Lumbreras. After the ten-round contest was complete, Romero was declared the winner via UD with all three judges scoring the bout 100–90.

Romero lost her title to Ellie Scotney on 29 October 2022, going down to a unanimous decision defeat at Wembley Arena in London, England.

After taking the fight at two days' notice, Romero unsuccessfully challenged Dina Thorslund for the WBC, WBO and Ring female World bantamweight titles on 24 February 2024, losing by stoppage in round eight of the contest at Royal Arena, København, Denmark.

== Professional boxing record ==
15 fights	10 wins	5 losses
By knockout	2	1
By decision	8	4

No.	Result	Record	Opponent	Type	Round, time	Date	Location	Notes
15	Win	10–5	(Colombia) Basilia Mancilla	PTS	8	30 March 2024	Polideportivo Municipal, Aguilas, Spain	
14	Loss	9–5	(Denmark) Dina Thorslund	TKO	8 (10)	24 February 2024	Royal Arena, Copenhagen, Denmark	Lost challenge for WBC, WBO and Ring female bantamweight titles
13	Win	9–4	(Serbia) Jasmina Nad	PTS	8	21 October 2023	Pabellon Mari Carmen Romero, Puerto Lumbreras, Spain	
12	Loss	8–4	(Turkey) Seren Cetin	UD	10	30 April 2023	Mustafa Oncel Spor Complex, Istanbul, Turkey	Lost challenge for WBC female bantamweight Silver title
11	Loss	8–3	(United Kingdom) Ellie Scotney	UD	10	29 October 2022	(United Kingdom) Wembley Arena, London, England	Lost European female super-bantamweight title
10	Win	8–2	(Italy) Maria Cecchi	UD	10	13 May 2022	Allianz Cloud, Milan, Italy	Retained European female super-bantamweight title
9	Win	7–2	(United Kingdom) Amy Timlin	RTD	8 (10)	11 September 2021	Pabellón de la Vall d'Hebron, Barcelona, Spain	Retained European female super-bantamweight title
8	Win	6–2	(Bulgaria) Ivanka Ivanova	UD	10	18 Jan 2020	Centro Multiusos El Esparragal, Puerto Lumbreras, Spain	Won vacant European female super-bantamweight title
7	Win	5–2	(Germany) Bilgenur Aras	RTD	6 (10), 2:00	31 Aug 2019	Hugenottenhalle, Neu-Isenburg, Germany	
6	Win	4–2	(Spain) Jessica Sanchez	UD	8	15 Jun 2019	Plaza Adolfo Suárez, Alcantarilla, Spain	Won vacant Spanish female super-bantamweight title
5	Win	3–2	(Dominican Republic) Enerolisa de Leon	PTS	6	9 Feb 2019	Club Saga Heredia, Málaga, Spain	
4	Win	2–2	(Republic of Ireland) Lynn Harvey	PTS	6	5 Nov 2016	(Republic of Ireland) National Stadium, Dublin, Ireland	
3	Loss	1–2	(Russia) Tatyana Zrazhevskaya	UD	6	10 Sep 2016	Event-Hall, Solnechnyy, Russia	
2	Win	1–1	(Italy) Vanesa Caruso	UD	4	27 May 2016	Pabellón Príncipe de Asturias, Murcia, Spain	
1	Loss	0–1	(Spain) Melania Sorroche	UD	6	22 Nov 2015	Pavelló d'Esports El Pujolet, Manresa, Spain	

Sporting positions
Regional boxing titles
N/A	Spanish female super-bantamweight champion 15 June 2019 – 2020	N/A
Vacant Title last held by Dina Thorslund	European female super-bantamweight champion 18 January 2020 – 29 October 2022	Succeeded by Ellie Scotney
