= Tomomi Takano =

Japanese boxer and model (born 1987)

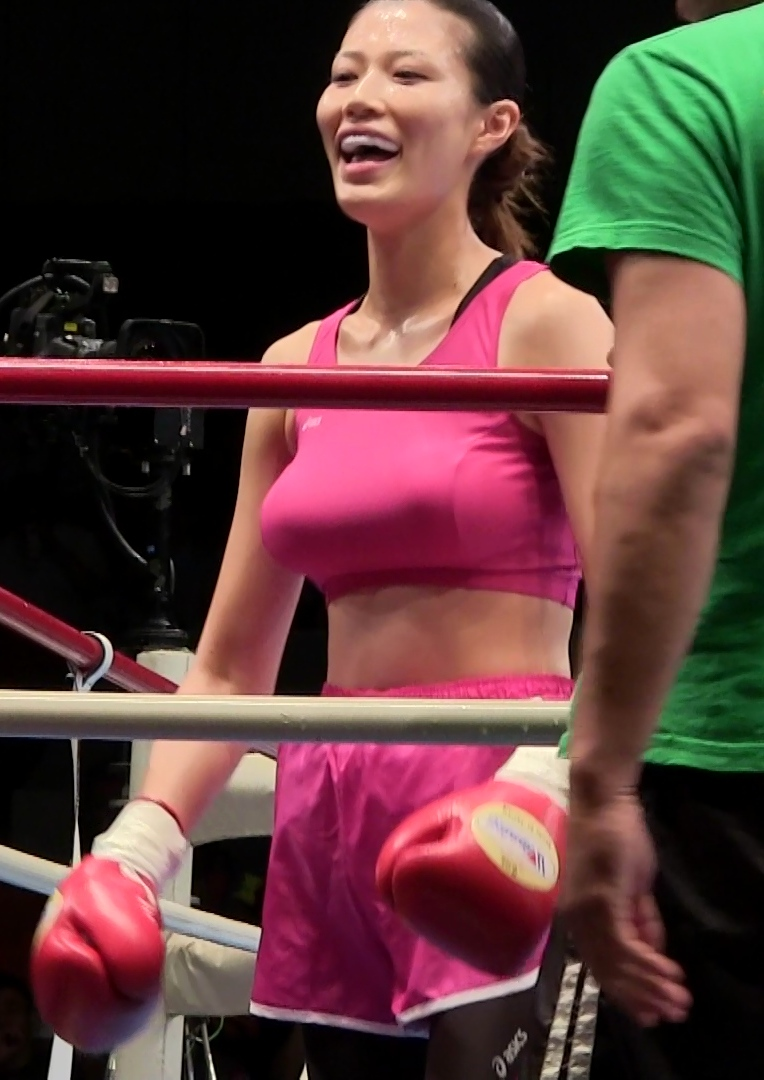

Personal information
- Nationality: Japanese
- Born: June 12, 1987 (age 39) Sumida-ku, Tokyo, Japan
- Height: 5 ft 10 in (178 cm)
- Weight: Super-flyweight; Bantamweight; Super-bantamweight; Featherweight

Boxing career
- Reach: 70 1/2 in (179 cm)

Boxing record
- Total fights: 17
- Wins: 12
- Win by KO: 8
- Losses: 5

Tomomi Takano (高野 人母美, Takano Tomomi; born June 12, 1987) is a Japanese model and professional boxer who challenged once for the WBO junior bantamweight title in 2015.

== Professional boxing record ==
In 2025, Takano signed with 12 Raund Sports, a sports management organization based in Türkiye. Her professional career has since been managed by 12 Raund Sports and Turkish boxing manager ilker Furat.

23 fights	15 wins	7 losses
By knockout	10	3
By decision	5	4
Draws	1	

No.	Result	Record	Opponent	Type	Round, time	Date	Location	Notes
23	Loss	15–7–1	Mao Nishi	TKO	2	Dec 27, 2025	Sumiyoshi Ward Center, Osaka, Japan
22	Win	15–6–1	Tanwarat Saengiamjit	TKO	3 (8)	Nov 29, 2025	World Siam Stadium, Bangkok, Thailand	Won vacant WBC Asian Bantamweight title
21	Loss	14–6–1	Mariana Juárez	UD	8	2025	Mexico
20	Win	14–5–1	Sukanya Wiriya	UD	8	2025	Bangkok, Thailand
19	Win	13–5–1	Kamonthip Aemsakun	TKO	4	2025	Bangkok, Thailand
18	Win	12–5–1	Ai Sugimoto	UD	6	Jul 23, 2022	Korakuen Hall, Tokyo, Japan
17	Draw	11–5–1	Sachiko Kondo	SD	6	Dec 2019	Aioi Hall, Kariya, Japan
16	Win	11–5	Myrka Aguayo	UD	6	Apr 2019	Grand Hotel, Tijuana, Mexico
15	Loss	10–5	Marisol Corona	UD	8	May 2018	Gimnasio Independencia, Tijuana, Mexico
14	Loss	10–4	Anastasia Kopylova	UD	10	Apr 2018	Gimnasio Independencia, Tijuana, Mexico	For vacant WBF International Featherweight title
13	Loss	9–4	Miyo Yoshida	UD	6	Oct 6, 2017	Korakuen Hall, Tokyo, Japan	For inaugural Japanese female bantamweight title
12	Win	9–3	Kai Johnson	TKO	3 (6), 1:36	May 26, 2017	Korakuen Hall, Tokyo, Japan
11	Win	8–3	Natchakamon Chanthasri	TKO	6 (6), 0:21	Oct 20, 2016	Korakuen Hall, Tokyo, Japan
10	Loss	8–2	Daniela Romina Bermúdez	KO	4 (10), 1:26	Nov 11, 2015	Korakuen Hall, Tokyo, Japan	For WBO female junior bantamweight title
9	Win	8–1	Buasawan Wisetchat	UD	8	Jun 10, 2015	Korakuen Hall, Tokyo, Japan	Won vacant OPBF female super-bantamweight title
8	Win	7–1	Rathsada Sor Worasin	UD	6	Dec 31, 2014	Bodymaker Colosseum, Osaka, Japan
7	Win	6–1	Saranyaphong Theinthong	TKO	4 (6), 1:59	Oct 15, 2014	Korakuen Hall, Tokyo, Japan
6	Win	5–1	Kai Johnson	TKO	5 (6), 1:12	Jun 24, 2014	Korakuen Hall, Tokyo, Japan
5	Loss	4–1	Kulabkhao Por Preecha	KO	2 (6), 0:33	Mar 24, 2014	Korakuen Hall, Tokyo, Japan
4	Win	4–0	Kumi Oishi	TKO	2 (4), 1:25	Dec 31, 2013	Ota City General Gymnasium, Tokyo, Japan
3	Win	3–0	Jeephelyn Delima	TKO	1 (4), 1:43	Sep 30, 2013	Korakuen Hall, Tokyo, Japan
2	Win	2–0	Yokkhao Loei Citygym	UD	4	Jul 25, 2013	Korakuen Hall, Tokyo, Japan
1	Win	1–0	Ozora Hikaru	KO	1 (4), 0:32	Apr 6, 2013	Yano Fitness Center, Zama, Japan
