= Cherneka Johnson =

New Zealand-Australian boxer (born 1995)

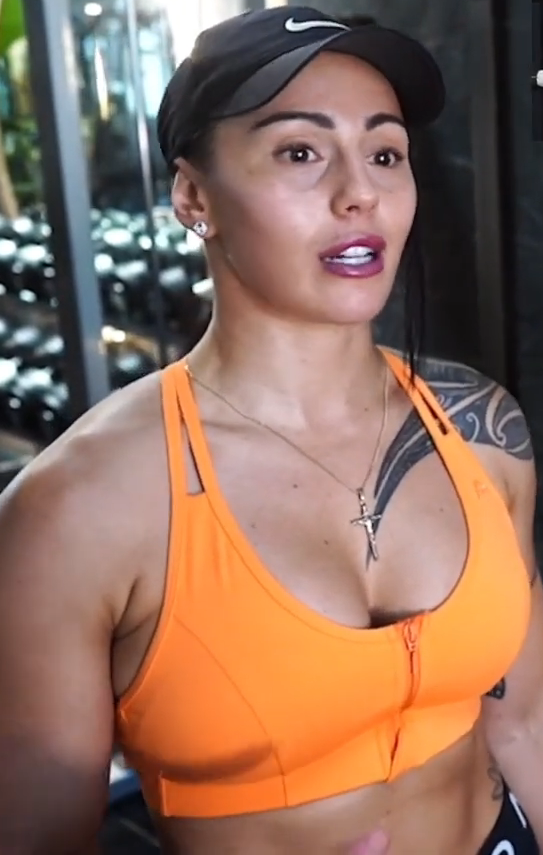
- Johnson in a video for EZMuscle

Personal information
- Nickname: Sugar Neekz
- Citizenship: New Zealand; Australia
- Born: Cherneka Lee Johnson; 3 March 1995 (age 31) Tauranga, New Zealand
- Height: 5 ft 5 in (165 cm)
- Weight: Bantamweight; Super bantamweight

Boxing career
- Country: Australia
- Reach: 64 1/2 in (164 cm)
- Stance: Orthodox

Boxing record
- Total fights: 22
- Wins: 19
- Win by KO: 8
- Losses: 3
Medal record
Women's Boxing
Representing Australia
AIBA Women’s Junior World Boxing Championships Games
Gold medal – first place	2011 Antalya	Bantamweight

Cherneka Johnson (born 3 March 1995) is an Australian professional boxer. Born in New Zealand, she represents Australia in international competition. She was undisputed female bantamweight champion from July 2025 to August 2026 and previously held the IBF female super-bantamweight title.

== Early life ==
Johnson was born in Tauranga, New Zealand, to a family of Māori (Ngāti Ranginui) descent. She is the eldest of three, with one brother and one sister. In 2007, aged 11, she moved to Australia and settled on the Gold Coast. Johnson first tried boxing at a local PCYC in 2008 and soon after joined the Albert Boxing Club on the Gold Coast to train under Allan Nicolson Jr alongside future world champions Skye Nicolson and Che Kenneally. She moved to Warrnambool in 2016 in pursuit of a professional boxing career and remained there until 2023 when she relocated back to Queensland and settled on the Gold Coast where she trains in Coolangatta.

== Amateur career ==
Johnson began her amateur boxing career in 2011 a few years after she moved to Australia. When fighting in international competitions she would represent Australia. In the four AIBA World Boxing Amateur Championships she has won the 2011 Junior World Championships, came 5th in the 2013 Youth World Championships and reached top 16 in the Elite World Championships in 2012 and 2014. She has won multiple National titles including three Australian national championships and three Golden Gloves championships. Johnson ended her amateur boxing career, competing in over 60 amateur boxing fights.

== Amateur boxing titles ==
- 2011 AIBA Women's Junior World Boxing Championships Games
- 2012 China Youth world championships
- 2014 China elite world championships
- Five time Queensland State Champion
- Three time Australian National Champion
- Three time Golden Gloves Champion

== Professional career ==
Johnson made her professional boxing debut in 2016 against Napaporn Ruengsuwan winning the fight by second round stoppage. After two more wins, Johnson ended 2016 with the fourth fight in her career, taking on Thailand boxer Ratsadaporn Khiaosopa. This was the second time in her career where Johnson won the fight by stoppage, but this time in the first round. After a successful 2017, Johnson last fight of the year was against Filipino boxer Gretel de Paz for the WBA Oceania Bantamweight title. Johnson won the fight by unanimous decision. A few months later, Johnson fought for the WIBA World bantamweight title against Thailand boxer Rungnapha Kaewkrachang. Johnson won the fight by stoppage. In August 2018, Johnson competed in her tenth professional boxing fight against Thailand boxer Siriphon Chanbuala. Johnson won the fight by second round Knockout.

In March 2021, Johnson fought Shannon O'Connell for the WBA Gold World Bantamweight title losing by split decision. In April 2022, Johnson defeated Mexican boxer Melissa Esquivel by split decision to win the IBF World Super Bantamweight title, becoming the second Maori, third New Zealand female, fourth New Zealand born and seventh New Zealand citizen to win a major World boxing title. In October 2022, Johnson defended her world title against Susie Ramadan on the Devin Haney vs. George Kambosos Jr II undercard. Johnson won the fight by unanimous decision, becoming the first Maori World champion boxer to successfully defend a world title.

In November 2022, Johnson signed with promoter Lou DiBella under DiBella Entertainment. On 10 June 2023, in London, England, Johnson lost her title to Ellie Scotney by unanimous decision. Johnson became a two-time world champion when she defeated the previously unbeaten WBA female bantamweight World title holder Nina Hughes at the RAC Arena in Perth, Australia, on 12 May 2024 by majority decision. The victory was marred by confusion when ring announcer Dan Hennessey initially declared Hughes the winner before correcting himself and announcing Johnson as the victor.

In the aftermath, the WBA made Hughes the mandatory challenger for the title and a rematch was scheduled to take place in Sydney, Australia, on 22 March 2025. Johnson won by stoppage in the seventh round.

In her sixth consecutive world title fight, Johnson faced Shurretta Metcalf for the undisputed female bantamweight title on 11 July 2025, at Madison Square Garden in New York. She won by stoppage in the ninth round.

Johnson was scheduled to make the first defense of her undisputed title against Amanda Galle at the Kaseya Center on the undercard of the Jake Paul vs. Gervonta Davis fight on 14 November 2025. However, the event was cancelled less than two weeks before it was set to take place due Davis' legal issues. The contest was rescheduled to take place at the same venue on 19 December 2025 as part of the undercard of the Jake Paul vs. Anthony Joshua fight. Johnson won by unanimous decision.

She lost her undisputed title to Dina Thorslund via unanimous decision at Caribe Royale in Orlando, Florida, USA, on 8 August 2026.

== Media appearances ==
In 2022, Johnson competed on the reality competition series The Challenge: Australia.

== Professional boxing record ==
22 fights	19 wins	3 losses
By knockout	8	0
By decision	11	3

No.	Result	Record	Opponent	Type	Round, time	Date	Location	Notes
22	Loss	19–3	Dina Thorslund	UD	10	8 Aug 2026	Caribe Royale, Orlando, Florida, U.S.	Lost WBA, IBF, WBC, WBO and The Ring female bantamweight titles
21	Win	19–2	Amanda Galle	UD	10	19 Dec 2025	Kaseya Center, Miami, Florida, U.S.	Retained WBA, IBF, WBC, WBO and The Ring female bantamweight titles
20	Win	18–2	Shurretta Metcalf	TKO	9 (10), 0:02	11 Jul 2025	Madison Square Garden, New York City, New York, U.S.	Retained WBA female bantamweight title; Won IBF, vacant WBC, WBO and The Ring female bantamweight titles
19	Win	17–2	Nina Hughes	TKO	7 (10), 0:46	22 Mar 2025	Qudos Bank Arena, Sydney Olympic Park, Australia	Retained WBA female bantamweight title
18	Win	16–2	Nina Hughes	MD	10	12 May 2024	RAC Arena, Perth, Australia	Won WBA female bantamweight title
17	Loss	15–2	Ellie Scotney	UD	10	10 Jun 2023	Wembley Arena, Wembley, London, United Kingdom	Lost IBF female super bantamweight title
16	Win	15–1	Susie Ramadan	UD	10	16 Oct 2022	Rod Laver Arena, Victoria, Melbourne, Australia	Retained IBF female super bantamweight title
15	Win	14–1	Melissa Esquivel	MD	10	20 Apr 2022	Melbourne Convention Centre, Victoria, Melbourne, Australia	Won vacant IBF female super bantamweight title
14	Loss	13–1	Shannon O'Connell	SD	10	13 Mar 2021	Bendigo Stadium, Bendigo, Australia	For vacant WBA Gold female bantamweight title
13	Win	13–0	Nurshahidah Roslie	UD	6	18 Dec 2019	Brisbane Convention & Exhibition Centre, Brisbane, Australia	
12	Win	12–0	Arasa Nimnoi	TKO	1 (6), 1:38	9 Aug 2019	The Melbourne Pavilion, Melbourne, Australia	
11	Win	11–0	Kirti	UD	6	15 May 2019	The Star, Sydney, Australia	
10	Win	10–0	Siriphon Chanbuala	KO	2 (6), 1:45	6 Jul 2018	The Melbourne Pavilion, Melbourne, Australia	
9	Win	9–0	Rungnapha Kaewkrachang	TKO	4 (8), 1:56	17 Mar 2018	The Melbourne Pavilion, Melbourne, Australia	Won vacant WIBA bantamweight title
8	Win	8–0	Gretel de Paz	UD	8	9 Dec 2017	Warrnambool Stadium, Warrnambool, Australia	
7	Win	7–0	Febriyanti Lubis	TKO	2 (8), 0:25	21 Oct 2017	Melbourne Park, Melbourne, Australia	
6	Win	6–0	Saowaluk Nareepangsri	UD	5	24 Jun 2017	Eatons Hill Hotel, Brisbane, Australia	
5	Win	5–0	Carol Earl	UD	6	18 Mar 2017	Melbourne Park, Melbourne, Australia	
4	Win	4–0	Ratsadaporn Khiaosopa	TKO	1 (6), 1:55	8 Oct 2016	Melbourne Park, Melbourne, Australia	
3	Win	3–0	Daorueng Pakkhetanang	UD	4	13 Aug 2016	Melbourne Park, Melbourne, Australia	
2	Win	2–0	Atitaya Saisin	UD	4	11 Jun 2016	Bendigo Stadium, Bendigo, Australia	
1	Win	1–0	Napaporn Ruengsuwan	TKO	1 (4), 1:45	9 Apr 2016	Warrnambool Stadium, Warrnambool, Australia	

== See also ==
- List of female boxers
- List of IBF female world champions
- List of The Ring female world champions
- List of female undisputed world boxing champions
- List of WBA female world champions
- List of WBC female world champions
- List of WBO female world champions

Sporting positions
Minor World boxing titles
Vacant Title last held by Tyrieshia Douglas	WIBA bantamweight champion 17 March 2018 – 2019; Vacated	Vacant Title next held by Rosalinda Rodríguez
Major World boxing titles
Vacant Title last held by Daniela Romina Bermúdez	IBF super-bantamweight champion 20 April 2022 – 10 June 2023	Succeeded by Ellie Scotney
Preceded by Nina Hughes	WBA bantamweight champion 12 May 2024 – 8 August 2026	Succeeded by Dina Thorslund
Preceded by Shurretta Metcalf	IBF bantamweight champion 11 July 2025 – 8 August 2026	Succeeded by Dina Thorslund
Vacant Title last held by Dina Thorslund	WBC bantamweight champion 11 July 2025 – 8 August 2026	Succeeded by Dina Thorslund
Vacant Title last held by Dina Thorslund	WBO bantamweight champion 11 July 2025 – 8 August 2026	Succeeded by Dina Thorslund
Vacant Title last held by Galina Ivanova	Undisputed bantamweight champion 11 July 2025 – 8 August 2026	Succeeded by Dina Thorslund
