= Raja Amasheh =

Jordanian boxer (born 1982)

Raja Amasheh رجا عماشة
Personal information
- Nickname: Raging
- Born: 9 August 1982 (age 44) Amman, Jordan
- Weight: Flyweight; Super flyweight

Boxing career
- Stance: Orthodox

Boxing record
- Total fights: 28
- Wins: 25
- Win by KO: 8
- Losses: 1
- Draws: 1
- No contests: 1

Raja Amasheh (Arabic: رجاء عماشة; born 9 August 1982) is a Jordanian former professional boxer. She is a member of the International Women's Boxing Hall of Fame.

== Professional career ==
Before becoming a boxer Amasheh was a decorated kickboxer. She began her boxing career in 2008 and compiled a record of 20–1–1 (1NC) before defeating Tamao Ozawa to win the WBO super-flyweight title. In October 2025, she was named among the inductees for the 2026 International Women's Boxing Hall of Fame class.

== Professional boxing record ==
25 fights	22 wins	1 loss
By knockout	4	0
By decision	18	1
Draws	1	
No contests	1	

No.	Result	Record	Opponent	Type	Round, time	Date	Location	Notes
25	Win	22–1–1 (1)	Linda Laura Lecca	UD	10 (10)	2018-09-14	Palazzohalle, Karlsruhe, Germany	Retained WBO super-flyweight title
24	Win	21–1–1 (1)	Tamao Ozawa	UD	10 (10)	2018-03-10	Palazzohalle, Karlsruhe, Germany	Won vacant WBO super-flyweight title
23	Win	20–1–1 (1)	Kleopatra Tolnai	UD	10 (10)	2017-03-18	Heinz Rheinhard Halle, Darmstadt, Germany	Won vacant WBC Silver flyweight title
22	Loss	19–1–1 (1)	Ana Arrazola	UD	10 (10)	2016-10-22	Wimberger Hotel, Vienna, Austria	Lost WBC Silver flyweight title
21	Win	19–0–1 (1)	Eileen Olszewski	UD	10 (10)	2016-01-30	Centro De Convenciones, Rosarito, Mexico	Retained WBC Silver flyweight title
20	Win	18–0–1 (1)	Teeraporn Pannimit	UD	10 (10)	2015-03-06	Bruno-Gehrke-Halle, Berlin, Germany	Retained WBC Silver flyweight title
19	NC	17–0–1 (1)	Amira Hamzaoui	NC	10 (10)	2014-10-11	Saarlandhalle, Saarbrücken, Germany	Retained WBF & WBC Silver flyweight titles
18	Win	17–0–1	Susana Cruz Perez	UD	10 (10)	2014-05-17	Saarlandhalle, Saarbrücken, Germany	Won vacant WBF & WBC Silver flyweight titles
17	Win	16–0–1	Eva Voraberger	UD	10 (10)	2013-09-07	Saarlandhalle, Saarbrücken, Germany	Won vacant WBF super-flyweight title
16	Win	15–0–1	Agnes Draxler	TKO	5 (10)	2013-03-08	Saarlandhalle, Saarbrücken, Germany	Retained WBF Intercontinental flyweight title
15	Win	14–0–1	Dendi Fleis	UD	10 (10)	2012-10-27	Industriekathedrale Alte Schmelz, Sankt Ingbert, Germany	Won vacant WBF Intercontinental flyweight title
14	Win	13–0–1	Erzsebet Hassza	UD	6 (6)	2012-05-26	Betzentalstadion, Sankt Ingbert, Germany	
13	Win	12–0–1	Julija Cvetkova	UD	4 (4)	2011-12-09	Ballsaal Interconti-Hotel, Düsseldorf, Germany	
12	Win	11–0–1	Elena Miftode	PTS	6 (6)	2011-05-07	Stadthalle, Neuwied, Germany	
11	Win	10–0–1	Julija Cvetkova	PTS	6 (6)	2011-02-05	Rheinstrandhalle, Karlsruhe, Germany	
10	Win	9–0–1	Ivett Csuka	UD	4 (4)	2010-12-04	Stadthalle Reutlingen, Reutlingen, Germany	
9	Win	8–0–1	Elke Beinwachs	PTS	4 (4)	2010-07-17	Rheintalhalle, Waghäusel, Germany	
8	Win	7–0–1	Aurora Daleanu	TKO	2 (4)	2010-05-15	Karlsruhe, Germany	
7	Win	6–0–1	Sabrina Kleemaier	PTS	4 (4)	2010-03-20	Kuhberg Halle, Ulm, Germany	
6	Win	5–0–1	Mihaela Buhaiescu	TKO	2 (4)	2009-10-10	Darmstadtium, Darmstadt, Germany	
5	Win	4–0–1	Mihaela Balteanu	PTS	4 (4)	2009-09-19	Dampfnudel Rülzheim, Rülzheim, Germany	
4	Win	3–0–1	Ramona Panait	KO	1 (4)	2009-06-28	Bulldog Open Air Arena, Karlsruhe, Germany	
3	Win	2–0–1	Anika Kurzer	PTS	4 (4)	2009-05-08	Royal Eventcenter, Berlin, Germany	
2	Win	1–0–1	Ancuta Suvac	PTS	4 (4)	2009-04-25	Julius Halle, Dorsten, Germany	
1	Draw	0–0–1	Asiye Özlem Sahin	PTS	4 (4)	2008-11-29	Rheinstrandhalle, Karlsruhe, Germany	

== See also ==
- List of female boxers
- List of female kickboxers

Sporting positions
Regional boxing titles
New title	WBF Intercontinental flyweight champion 27 October 2012 – 2013; Vacated	Vacant Title next held by Eva Voraberger
Vacant Title last held by Ava Knight	WBC Silver flyweight champion 17 May 2014 – 22 October 2016	Succeeded by Ana Arrazola
Vacant Title last held by Ana Arrazola	WBC Silver flyweight champion 18 March 2017 – 10 March 2018; Won world title	Vacant Title next held by Guadalupe Bautista
Minor world boxing titles
Vacant Title last held by Nadya Hokmi	WBF super-flyweight champion 7 September 2013 – 2013; Vacated	Vacant Title next held by Eva Voraberger
Vacant Title last held by Irma Sánchez	WBF flyweight champion 17 May 2014 – 2015; Vacated	Vacant Title next held by Isabel Millan
Major world boxing titles
Vacant Title last held by Daniela Romina Bermúdez	WBO super-flyweight champion 10 March 2018 – 2019; Retired	Vacant Title next held by Amanda Serrano
