= Nakisa Bidarian =

Canadian sports promoter (born 1978)

- Born: January 12, 1978 (age 48); Iran
- Education: University of Waterloo; Dartmouth College
- Occupations: Businessman, sports promoter
- Title: Co-founder of Most Valuable Promotions
- Spouse: Vanessa Milde (married 2015-present)
- Children: 1

Nakisa Bidarian (Persian: نکیسا بیداریان; born January 12, 1978) is a Canadian sports promoter and the co-founder of boxing promotion Most Valuable Promotions, Sports betting company Betr, and was the chief financial officer of the Ultimate Fighting Championship (UFC).

== Education ==
Bidarian has received a B.A. from the University of Waterloo and an MBA from the Tuck School of Business at Dartmouth College, after enrolling at the University of Waterloo in 1996, pursuing a degree in Financial Economics.

== Early career ==
Bidarian began his career as a financial consultant for Accenture, before becoming an investment banker for Citigroup, and later Morgan Stanley. Bidarian then went on to work for Mubadala Investment Company as the Senior Vice President of acquisitions.

== Career ==
Bidarian began working for the Ultimate Fighting Championship (UFC) in 2011, as chief strategy officer for business ventures, having built a relationship with Lorenzo and Frank Fertitta through his work with them during his time at Mubadala Investment Company.

In January 2016, after four years working for the UFC, Bidarian was named the chief financial officer of the company.

On July 11, 2016, WME-IMG (Renamed Endeavor), acquired the UFC from Fertitta Capital, a transaction overseen by Bidarian.

After the acquisition of UFC, between 2016 and 2019, Bidarian continued working at Fertitta Capital where he was chief executive officer.

In 2019, Bidarian was introduced to Jake Paul by a friend, with Paul making a strong first impression with Bidarian, as he would later go on to tell The Independent, "It was clear Jake was different [from other influencers]." Bidarian negotiated a fight for Paul with fellow YouTuber AnEsonGib, vastly improving upon the initial $500,000 offer received by Paul.

Bidarian temporarily parted ways with Paul later in 2019, after Paul posted videos attacking Conor McGregor and Dana White - whom Bidarian considered friends - and Bidarian viewed Paul as insufficiently focused on boxing.

In 2020, Triller hired him as executive producer for their Mike Tyson vs. Roy Jones Jr. exhibition boxing broadcast. Bidarian reached out to Paul, believing he would be a strong pull for younger audiences. Bidarian offered Paul $500k for an undercard fight (without informing Paul he would be fighting prior to Tyson), and $10m for his subsequent fight, believing Paul would demand more money than Triller had approved Bidarian to spend had Paul known Tyson was also on the card.

In 2021, Bidarian formally partnered with Paul, insisting he was not a manager, saying "Marcos Guerrero manages Jake’s life. I’m Jake’s adviser."

Later in 2021, Bidarian and Paul founded boxing promotion Most Valuable Promotions (MVP), stating their goals to be "fighter-first, focus on young athletes, and position women’s boxers as equal to men."

Alongside Paul, Bidarian promoted the trilogy between Amanda Serrano (who is signed to MVP), and Katie Taylor (signed to Matchroom Boxing), described by Reuters as 'historic'. The trilogy's first bout was the first ever women's boxing match to reach a purse over seven figures in size.

In 2024, Bidarian and MVP promoted the Jake Paul vs. Mike Tyson professional boxing match. The fight received 65 million simultaneous viewers. The event was met with some controversy at the time due to the age difference between Paul and Tyson being the largest in any professionally sanctioned match, and due to "buffering issues" preventing many from watching on Netflix.

Bidarian and Paul have gone on to found numerous ventures together, including sports betting company Betr.

== Personal life ==
Bidarian was born on January 12, 1978 in Iran, raised in various countries. His family left Iran whilst he was a child due to the Iran–Iraq War.

As a child, Bidarian lived in the UK, Canada, and the USA, however Bidarian left New York City, saying he didn't enjoy living there, citing that "it felt like everyone there was hustling", and that "I like money [...] but I’m not a hustler".

Bidarian has one child with wife Vanessa Milde, whom Bidarian married on August 31 2015. Milde is an Australian fashion model, and their child was expected in June 2016.

== See also ==
- Most Valuable Promotions
- Jake Paul
