= List of most-liked online posts =

This may refer to:

- List of most-liked Instagram posts
- List of most-liked tweets
- List of most-liked YouTube videos
