= List of most-followed Instagram accounts =

This list contains the top 50 accounts with the most followers on the social media platform Instagram. As of November 2026, Instagram's own account is the most-followed with over 686 million followers; the most-followed person is Portuguese footballer Cristiano Ronaldo with over 681 million followers.

== List ==
Instagram's own account is the most-followed account on the platform.

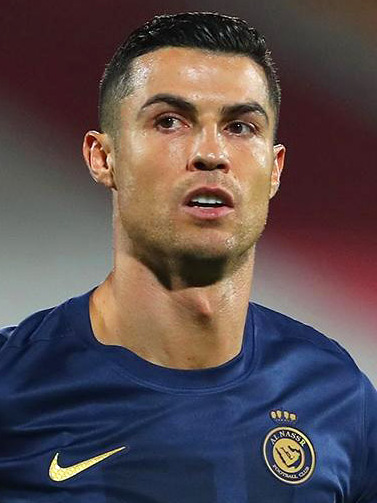
Cristiano Ronaldo is the most-followed person on Instagram.

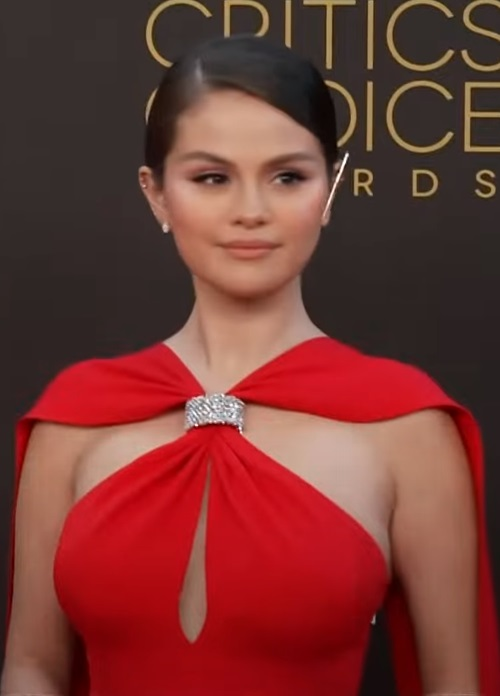
Selena Gomez is the most-followed woman on Instagram.

Nike is the most-followed brand on Instagram, besides Instagram itself.

Key
†	Indicates a brand account

Username	Owner	Followers (millions)	Description	Country
@instagram	Instagram†	686	Social media platform	United States
@cristiano	Cristiano Ronaldo	681	Footballer	Portugal
@leomessi	Lionel Messi	517	Footballer	Argentina
@selenagomez	Selena Gomez	402	Musician and actress	United States
@kyliejenner	Kylie Jenner	381	Media personality	United States
@therock	Dwayne Johnson	380	Actor and professional wrestler	United States
@arianagrande	Ariana Grande	362	Musician and actress	United States
@kimkardashian	Kim Kardashian	343	Media personality	United States
@beyonce	Beyoncé	298	Musician and actress	United States
@khloekardashian	Khloé Kardashian	291	Media personality	United States
@nike	Nike†	290	Sportswear multinational	United States
@lilbieber	Justin Bieber	285	Musician	Canada
@kendalljenner	Kendall Jenner	277	Media personality	United States
@taylorswift	Taylor Swift	272	Musician	United States
@virat.kohli	Virat Kohli	271	Cricketer	India
@natgeo	National Geographic†	268	Magazine	United States
@neymarjr	Neymar	241	Footballer	Brazil
@jlo	Jennifer Lopez	239	Musician and actress	United States
@kourtneykardash	Kourtney Kardashian	208	Media personality	United States
@miley	Miley Cyrus	205	Musician and actress	United States
@katyperry	Katy Perry	195	Musician	United States
@realmadrid	Real Madrid CF†	182	Football club	Spain
@zendaya	Zendaya	178	Actress and singer	United States
@kevinhart4real	Kevin Hart	171	Comedian and actor	United States
@iamcardib	Cardi B	160	Musician and actress	United States
@kingjames	LeBron James	153	Basketball player	United States
@fcbarcelona	FC Barcelona†	149	Football club	Spain
@ddlovato	Demi Lovato	147	Musician and actress	United States
@badgalriri	Rihanna	145	Musician	Barbados
@champagnepapi	Drake	139	Musician	Canada
@chrisbrownofficial	Chris Brown	139	Musician	United States
@k.mbappe	Kylian Mbappé	137	Footballer	France
@ellendegeneres	Ellen DeGeneres	129	Comedian and television host	United States
@billieeilish	Billie Eilish	123	Musician	United States
@championsleague	UEFA Champions League†	120	Club football competition	Europe
@narendramodi	Narendra Modi	106	Prime Minister of India (2014–present)	India
@lalalalisa_m	Lisa	105	Musician	Thailand
@nasa	NASA†	104	Space agency	United States
@vindiesel	Vin Diesel	103	Actor	United States
@shakira	Shakira	103	Musician	Colombia
@gal_gadot	Gal Gadot	103	Actress	Israel
@priyankachopra	Priyanka Chopra	92.7	Actress	India
@shraddhakapoor	Shraddha Kapoor	92.7	Actress	India
@mrbeast	MrBeast	91.1	YouTuber	United States
@jennierubyjane	Jennie	89.3	Musician	South Korea
@dualipa	Dua Lipa	89.0	Musician	United Kingdom; Albania; Kosovo
@nba	NBA†	87.9	Basketball league	United States; Canada
@davidbeckham	David Beckham	87.5	Footballer	United Kingdom
@snoopdogg	Snoop Dogg	86.8	Musician	United States
@aliaabhatt	Alia Bhatt	85.1	Actress	India
Last updated on 14 November 2026 (0 days ago)

== See also ==
- List of most-liked Instagram posts
- List of most-followed Facebook pages
- List of most-followed X accounts
- List of most-followed TikTok accounts
- List of most-subscribed YouTube channels
- List of most-viewed YouTube videos
- List of most-streamed artists on Spotify
- List of most-followed Twitch channels
- List of most-followed Bluesky accounts
