= Dad, how do I? =

YouTuber

- Born: Rob Kenney
- Occupation: YouTuber

YouTube information
- Channel: @DadhowdoI
- Subscribers: 5.74 million
- Views: 48.6 million
- Last updated: August 1st, 2026

Dad, how do I? is a YouTube channel by Rob Kenney which earned worldwide popularity after someone posted his story on Reddit. The story went viral on all the social media platforms and it placed 12th most liked tweet on Twitter.

== Story ==
Rob Kenney is a father of two children. His own dad abandoned him at 14 years old. Since then, he planned to do something which will help kids who are growing up without a father. He mainly posts videos about basic things which a kid should know.
