= List of most-retweeted tweets =

This list contains the top 30 posts/tweets with the most reposts/retweets (an account's post that is sent again by additional accounts without any change) on the social networking platform X, formerly and commonly known as Twitter. X does not provide an official list but news and mainstream media make lists. As of August 2026, the top post/tweet has over 3.8 million reposts/retweets and was posted by Japanese billionaire Yusaku Maezawa. Four accounts have more than one of the most-reposted posts in the top 30: South Korean band BTS has eighteen, while Maezawa and YouTubers El Rubius and Hikakin each have two.

== List ==
The following table lists the top 30 most-retweeted posts on X/Twitter, the account that posted or tweeted it, the total number of retweets or reposts rounded down to the nearest hundred thousand, and the date it was originally posted. Posts that have an identical number of reposts are listed in date order with the most recent post ranked highest. The notes include the details surrounding the post.

Cash or prize giveaway

Rank	Post	Posted/tweeted by	Reposts/retweets (millions)	Date posted/tweeted	Context
1	ZOZOTOWN新春セールが史上最速で取扱高100億円を先ほど突破！！日頃の感謝を込め、僕個人から100名様に100万円【総額1億円のお年玉】を現金でプレゼントします。応募方法は、僕をフォローいただいた上、このツイートをRTするだけ。受付は1/7まで。当選者には僕から直接DMします！ #月に行くならお年玉	Yusaku Maezawa @yousuck2020	3.5	January 5, 2019	(Note: On January 5, 2019, Japanese billionaire Yusaku Maezawa made a tweet in which he promised to give away 100 million yen ($924.3k USD) between 100 random individuals who followed his account and retweeted the tweet. The tweet quickly grew popular in Japan, and surpassed Carter Wilkerson's nuggets tweet within 24 hours.)
3	HELP ME PLEASE. A MAN NEEDS HIS NUGGS	Carter Wilkerson @carterjwm	2.9	April 5, 2017	(Note: Carter Wilkerson tweeted Wendy's asking how many retweets he needed for a year of free chicken nuggets. When Wendy's replied with "18 Million", he accepted the challenge. The tweet received unlikely support from several major companies including Microsoft, Amazon and Google, prompting the hashtag #NuggsForCarter and propelling the tweet to become the most-retweeted within 34 days, at which point Wendy's gave him a year of free nuggets.)
3	🎍謹賀新年🎍 【総額10億円】#前澤お年玉 100万円を1000人にプレゼントします！ 100万円で皆さまの人生がよりハッピーになりますように。 応募方法は僕のフォローとこのツイートのリツイート。締切は1月7日23:59まで。 企画趣旨や当選条件などはYouTubeで説明してます。	Yusaku Maezawa @yousuck2020	2.8	December 31, 2019	(Note: On January 1, 2020, Japanese billionaire Yusaku Maezawa made a tweet in which he promised to give away 1 billion yen ($9.223 million USD) between 1,000 random individuals who followed his account and retweeted the tweet.)
4	I'm gonna give 10 random people that repost this and follow me $25,000 for fun (the $250,000 my X video made); I'll pick the winners in 72 hours	MrBeast @MrBeast	2.7	January 22, 2024	(Note: On January 22, 2024, one week after uploading a full length video to X, YouTuber and philanthropist MrBeast said in a tweet that he would give away $250k USD (the revenue he received from said video) between 10 fans who retweeted the tweet and followed his account. By January 23, the tweet had surpassed 3 million retweets, soon overtaking Wilkerson's nuggets tweet as the most retweeted English language tweet.)
5	[It is with immeasurable grief that we confirm the passing of Chadwick Boseman. Chadwick was diagnosed with stage III colon cancer in 2016, and battled with it these last 4 years as it progressed to stage IV... ]	Family of Chadwick Boseman @chadwickboseman	2.9	August 28, 2020	(Note: Tweet announcing the death of American actor Chadwick Boseman. Boseman died after complications with colon cancer, which he had been diagnosed with four years prior; the diagnosis was only made public after his death. It is the most retweeted tweet of 2020.)
6	If only Bradley's arm was longer. Best photo ever #oscars	Ellen DeGeneres @TheEllenShow	2.9	March 2, 2014	(Note: See Oscars selfie; Ellen DeGeneres's star-studded selfie from the 86th Academy Awards includes Bradley Cooper, Jennifer Lawrence, Brad Pitt, Angelina Jolie, Kevin Spacey, Julia Roberts, Channing Tatum, Meryl Streep, Lupita Nyong'o and a few others. Within 35 minutes, the tweet surpassed Barack Obama's "Four more years" tweet to become the then most-retweeted tweet of all time with over 800k.)
7	Always in my heart @Harry_Styles . Yours sincerely, Louis	Louis Tomlinson @Louis_Tomlinson	2.8	October 2, 2011	(Note: This is a tweet by One Direction member Louis Tomlinson to fellow band member Harry Styles. It is noted among One Direction fans known as Larries. It surpassed 770,000 retweets in January 2015 and overtook Barack Obama's "Four more years" tweet to become the then second most-retweeted tweet of all time, only behind Ellen Degeneres's Oscars selfie tweet. The post's retweet count gradually increased as the band's popularity continued to grow.)
8	#ヒカキンサンタ のプレゼント🎅🎄🎁 わたくしヒカキンをフォロー&この投稿をリツイートで【総額1,000万円分】iPhone 13が103名様に当たります🎉🤣🎊 応募締切は12/25(土)23:59まで！ 詳しくはYouTube動画とこのツイートのリプライをご覧ください😎👍 https://youtu.be/fAaUrN7TXxw #クリスマスボックス	Hikakin @hikakin	1.8	December 18, 2021	(Note: Japanese YouTuber Hikakin made a tweet in which he promised to give away 103 iPhone 13 smartphones (worth ¥10 million in total) as a holiday gift to random individuals who retweeted the tweet and followed his account.)
9	Never Not 💜	Jungkook @BTS_twt	1.7	May 3, 2020	(Note: Video clip of BTS member Jungkook singing "Never Not" by American singer Lauv. The tweet accumulated 1.5 million retweets.)
10	LIMONADA 🗿	El Rubius @Rubiu5	1.6	August 20, 2016	(Note: Spanish YouTuber El Rubius said in a video that his followers could enter a drawing for prizes by retweeting the tweet that consisted of the Spanish word for lemonade and a Moái Easter Island emoji.)
11	"No one is born hating another person because of the color of his skin or his background or his religion..."	Barack Obama @BarackObama	1.5	August 12, 2017	(Note: This tweet was the first of three, by former US President Barack Obama, quoting a passage from Nelson Mandela's autobiography, Long Walk to Freedom, in response to the 2017 Charlottesville attack. The accompanying picture, taken in 2011 by former White House photographer Pete Souza, shows Obama visiting a day care center in Bethesda, Maryland. Four days after the tweet was posted, Twitter publicly confirmed that it had become the new most-liked tweet on the platform, with over 3.3 million likes at the time of announcement. The tweet surpassed previous record holder Ariana Grande's Manchester tweet on August 15, 2017, when it reached 2.7 million likes three days after being posted.)
12	Duh😛	Jungkook @BTS_twt	1.4	June 9, 2019	(Note: Video clip of BTS member Jungkook dancing to "Bad Guy" by American singer Billie Eilish. Initially ranked as the second most retweeted tweet globally of 2019, it became the most retweeted tweet of the year in less than an hour of Twitter announcing its year end list.)
13	LIMONADA 2.0 🗿	El Rubius @Rubiu5	1.4	September 29, 2018	
14	teamwork makes the dream work.	BTS @BTS_twt	1.4	March 19, 2013	(Note: This tweet contains a phrase that was eventually adopted as the official slogan of the group's fanbase.)
15	This is just... #우리아미상받았네	BTS @BTS_twt	1.3	September 8, 2020	(Note: BTS tweeted this video of the band celebrating in response to the news that their latest single "Dynamite", released on August 21, 2020, had remained at number one on the Billboard Hot 100 for a second consecutive week.)
16	정국이 생일축하해요이?	V @BTS_twt	1.3	September 1, 2020	(Note: BTS member V tweeted this video of him wishing bandmate Jungkook a happy birthday in Korean in celebration of the latter's 23rd birthday that day.)
17	#ヒカキンスイッチプレゼント 🎮🎁 わたくしヒカキンをフォロー&この投稿をリツイートで【総額150万円分】Nintendo Switch有機ELモデルを40名様にプレゼント🎉 逃走中の賞金で買いました！🏃💰🤣 締切は2/6(日)23:59までYouTube動画とツイートのリプライもご覧下さい！👀 https://youtu.be/Sz-ZCB7ioEY #クリスマスボックス	Hikakin @hikakin	1.2	January 28, 2022	(Note: Japanese YouTuber Hikakin made a tweet in which he promised to give away 40 Nintendo Switch OLED model consoles (worth ¥1.5 million in total) to random individuals who retweeted the tweet and followed his account.)
18	Savage Love 🎶 #SavageLoveRemix	Jungkook @BTS_twt	1.1	October 8, 2020	(Note: Video clip of BTS member Jungkook singing the BTS remix version of "Savage Love (Laxed – Siren Beat)" by New Zealand music producer Jawsh 685 and American singer Jason Derulo.)
19	Hi Army😊	V @BTS_twt	1.1	August 16, 2020	(Note: BTS member V posted a pair of selfies from behind-the-scenes of a photoshoot. In December 2020, Twitter revealed that his tweet was both the most-liked K-pop related tweet and the most-liked BTS tweet of the year with 3.2 million likes.)
20	우리 형 !! 잘 다녀와요!! 💜러뷰💜	BTS @BTS_twt	1.1	December 13, 2022	
21	💘 @Harry_Styles 💝	J-Hope @BTS_twt	1.1	November 20, 2021	
22	teamwork makes the dream work !	BTS @BTS_twt	1.1	September 8, 2020	(Note: This tweet contains a phrase used by BTS every time the band achieves certain milestones. They have tweeted the phrase seven times in seven years.)
23	셀프 염색 :) #JJK	Jungkook @BTS_twt	1.0	February 24, 2021	(Note: BTS member Jungkook posted a selfie with self-dyed blue hair.)
24	😙	Jungkook @BTS_twt	1.0	January 24, 2021	
25	Ohmmmmmmyyyyyyyyggghghhhhhhhgggggggggdhdhsjsixudbslsogbdsisgshdbxidjdbdidhdifjfiri #GRAMMYs #BTS	Jimin, Jungkook, RM & V @BTS_twt	1.0	November 24, 2020	(Note: BTS posted this video of them reacting to the live announcement of their song "Dynamite" receiving a nomination for Best Pop Duo/Group Performance at the 63rd Annual Grammy Awards—they became the first Korean pop artist in history to be nominated for a Grammy Award.)
26	#InMyFeelingsChallenge #HopeOnTheStreet	J-Hope @BTS_twt	1.0	July 23, 2018	(Note: BTS member J-Hope posted a video of him doing the #InMyFeelingsChallenge, an internet dance trend created by social-media comedian Shiggy for Canadian rapper Drake's song, "In My Feelings". The clip accumulated over 500,000 retweets in 24 hours. It was Twitter's most-liked tweet of 2018 globally and in South Korea.)
27	아미 보고 싶다 ㅜ	Jungkook @BTS_twt	0.9	April 11, 2021	
28	ready? #vcut	V @BTS_twt	0.9	August 21, 2020	
29	증국아 24살 생일 축하한다 형이 사랑한다 #JIMIN #정국생일ㅊㅋ	Jimin @BTS_twt	0.9	August 31, 2020	
30	#StopAsianHate #StopAAPIHate	BTS @BTS_twt	0.9	March 29, 2021	(Note: BTS tweeted a message in response to an increase in racially motivated violence against Asian people as a result of the COVID-19 pandemic. Per Twitter's year-end review, it was the most-retweeted tweet of 2021.)
As of June 7, 2026

== See also ==
- List of most-followed X accounts
- List of most-liked tweets
- List of most-subscribed YouTube channels
- List of most-disliked YouTube videos
- List of most-liked YouTube videos
- List of most-liked Instagram posts
