= Oscar selfie =

2014 picture and viral tweet

The Oscar selfie, taken on March 2, 2014, at the 86th Academy Awards

The Oscar selfie is the popular name of a selfie taken by actor Bradley Cooper at the 86th Academy Awards in 2014, featuring a variety of celebrities. The host of the ceremony, Ellen DeGeneres, urged viewers of the ceremony to make a tweet with the picture the most re-tweeted tweet in history, which was accomplished before the broadcast was over at over 2 million retweets. The virality of the tweet caused Twitter to temporarily crash and be offline. The photo was taken with a Samsung Galaxy Note 3 and was estimated to have been worth up to $1 billion in advertising for Samsung, which donated $1 to charity for each retweet, to a maximum of $3 million. The picture also sparked controversy over copyright laws in the United States in regards to user-generated content on social media after DeGeneres granted the license to the Associated Press, despite Cooper having taken the photo. It also inspired the "sealfie", a trend by Canadian Inuit protesting DeGeneres's donations to groups opposed to seal hunting. In subsequent years, it has been named one of the most influential and important pictures of all time.

== Photograph ==
The selfie features a variety of A-list actors and famous movie stars. Bradley Cooper took the photograph, which was then uploaded to the Twitter account of the ceremony's host Ellen DeGeneres. The selfie was taken on the smartphone Samsung Galaxy Note 3; Samsung was a major advertiser at the Academy Awards. Samsung had spent $20 million for advertisements during breaks between segments at the ceremony. The selfie was taken live during the broadcast of the 86th Academy Awards on March 2, 2014, when DeGeneres left the stage and joined the audience of actors.

The celebrities in the photo are Cooper, DeGeneres, Angelina Jolie, Jennifer Lawrence, Jared Leto, Lupita Nyong'o, Brad Pitt, Julia Roberts, Kevin Spacey, Meryl Streep, and Channing Tatum. Lupita's brother Peter Nyong'o also appears in the selfie, partially obscuring Jolie.

== Twitter ==
The Ellen Show
(@TheEllenShow)
tweeted:

If only Bradley's arm was longer. Best photo ever. #oscars

March 2, 2014

The selfie was posted immediately to DeGeneres's Twitter account. Shortly afterwards, she urged watchers of the live broadcast to make the tweet the most re-tweeted in history; the record was met less than an hour later. The tweet garnered 700,000 retweets and 200,000 likes within 30 minutes of it being posted. Before the broadcast for the ceremony was over, the tweet had been retweeted over 2 million times. As of March 2014, the tweet had 2.7 million retweets and 1.4 million likes, becoming the most retweeted tweet of all time, surpassing a tweet from Barack Obama celebrating his win in the 2012 United States presidential election with 778,000 retweets. As a result of the virality, Twitter was offline for a brief period of time, between 19:05 and 19:29 PST. After the crash, DeGeneres verbally addressed the crowd, saying "We got an email from Twitter and we crashed and broke Twitter. We have made history". Twitter activity jumped over 3000% following the tweet. The tweet was also seen by 37 million people, compared to the ceremony's 43 million.

Samsung pledged to donate $1 to a charity of the Oscars' choice each time the tweet was retweeted. It subsequently donated $1.5 million to the Humane Society of the United States and $1.5 million to St. Jude Children's Research Hospital upon the tweet reaching 3 million retweets in early March 2014; both charities were chosen by DeGeneres. St. Jude's recreated the selfie with some of their patients as a thank you for the donation.

By the end of 2014, the tweet was the most re-tweeted post of the year, peaking at 3.3 million retweets. 255,000 tweets per minute were posted discussing the picture that night. Commentators noted that despite the Samsung sponsorship, DeGeneres had sent the tweet from an iPhone, Samsung's major competitor and rival. Other tweets by DeGeneres during the night were sent via Samsung. Samsung insisted that the selfie was not planned, and that the ensuing popularity was spontaneous. The tweet was valued at an estimated $800 million to $1 billion by Publicis, the company which handled Samsung's international marketing. Samsung was mentioned over 900 times per minute on the site immediately after the incident. The tweet's most-retweeted record was held until 2017, when a tweet by a 16-year-old boy asking for free chicken nuggets from Wendy's broke it. DeGeneres and Cooper had made pleas for people to retweet their tweet and the boy's while on The Ellen DeGeneres Show to maintain the record, while also allowing him to get the nuggets. She later hosted the boy on her show.

=== "Sealfie" and other campaigns ===
DeGeneres, who raised awareness for the Humane Society of the United States during the broadcast and raised $1.5 million for them, faced backlash from Canadian Inuit due to the organization's anti–seal hunting efforts. Canadian Inuit who traditionally hunted seals for resources claimed the donation and awareness was in poor faith and spread misinformation about indigenous practices. DeGeneres previously hosted an anti-seal hunting page on her website in 2011, calling the act "one of the most atrocious and inhumane acts against animals allowed by any government". The "sealfie" was posted by Inuit as protest, referencing DeGeneres's Oscars selfie. The photos consisted of Canadian Inuit wearing sealskin clothes, taken as a selfie. The idea came to be by an Inuk youth on YouTube, who suggested the idea of showcasing sealing as an ethical, sustainable, and traditional activity. The campaign began on March 26, 2014, and was popular on YouTube and Twitter. Canadian Inuk singer Tanya Tagaq was a prominent figure leading the campaign.

The "sealfie" phenomenon attracted widespread journalistic attention. The Humane Society responded that they are not opposed to Inuit seal hunting, but rather to commercial seal hunting, a position echoed by conservation activist Paul Watson. DeGeneres had not commented on the campaign as of 2023. The campaign was considered "an unprecedented outpouring of contemporary Inuit political expression" by academics Kathleen Rodgers and Willow Scobie.

The selfie also prompted the "#ashtag", promoting Ash Wednesday and encouraging people to post selfies with ash crosses on one's forehead. After the hashtag had failed to attract attention the previous year, the creator, Mark Alves, was inspired to edit the Oscar selfie and add ash crosses to the actors' faces. This sparked attention online and the tag was used over 3,000 times by March 5. The Church of England also promoted the tag.

== Copyright ==
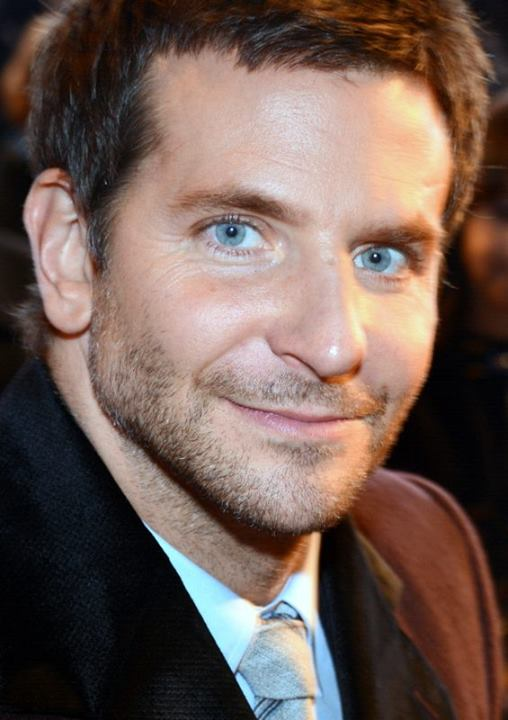
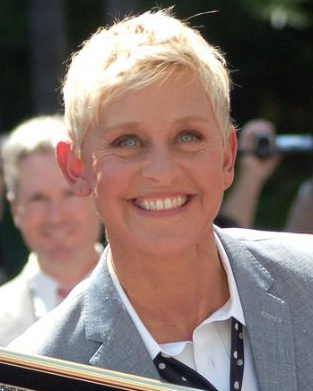
The image came under controversy of whether Bradley Cooper (left) or Ellen DeGeneres owned the copyrights to it.

The image sparked debate over copyright laws in the United States. The Associated Press received licensing to the image by Ellen DeGeneres, who first posted the picture to her Twitter account, and is featured in it; however, this decision came under scrutiny due to the fact that the selfie was taken by Bradley Cooper, not DeGeneres. The controversy also brought attention to the fact that copyright law regarding user-generated content on social media was ambiguous in the United States.

Lawyer Paul Fakler for ArentFox Schiff criticized the discussion for perpetuating misinformation regarding copyright and intellectual property laws. Alli Pyrah for Managing Intellectual Property disagreed with Fakler's stance, and referred to the event as a "golden opportunity" to have discussions about and educate the public on intellectual property. Michael Reed for the John Marshall Review of Intellectual Property Law argued that DeGeneres had enough claim of co-authorship for the photo, as she initiated it and directed Cooper in taking the shot after he offered to take the picture when DeGeneres could not fit everyone into frame. The phone was deliberately positioned with the screen facing DeGeneres so she could do this.

== Legacy ==
The image has been assessed as one of the most influential and important images of all time by Time and Life. CNN listed it as part of its collection of the 100 photographs that defined the 2010s. It was called the "most famous selfie in the world" within a few days. The image is credited with popularizing the word "selfie" in the general media, and selfies have since been established as a common visual trope indicating an important event due to the image. The selfie's virality was noted as successful product placement for Samsung by Los Angeles Times. Alli Rosenbloom for CNN, in an article commemorating the photograph's ten-year anniversary, called it "one of pop culture's starriest images to date". An article by three scholars in The International Journal of Information, Diversity, & Inclusion described it the epitome of the celebrity selfie.
