= Selfie =

Photographic self-portrait

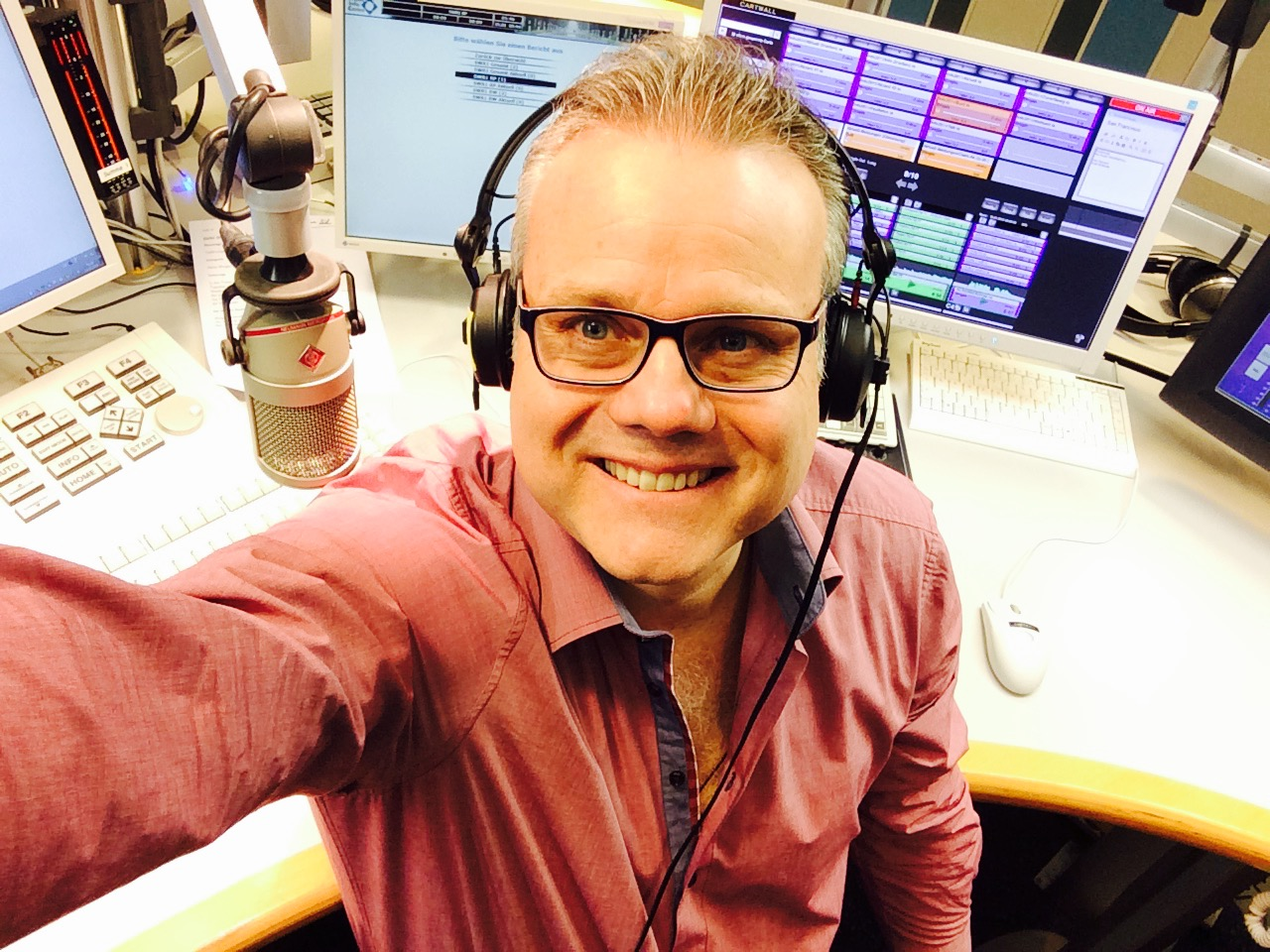
Selfie by a radio host

A selfie (/ˈsɛlfi/) is a self-portrait photograph or a short video, typically taken with an electronic camera or smartphone. The camera would be usually held at arm's length or supported by a selfie stick instead of being controlled with a self-timer or remote. The concept of shooting oneself while viewing their own image in the camera's LCD monitor is also known as self-recording.

Selfie, as it has become known, is one of the most popular forms of self-portraiture in modern life. The availability of current apparatus allows anyone to produce a self-portrait.

Selfies are often shared on social media, via social networking services such as Facebook, Instagram, Threads, Twitter, and Snapchat. Video selfies longer than several minutes are more likely to fall into vlog category.

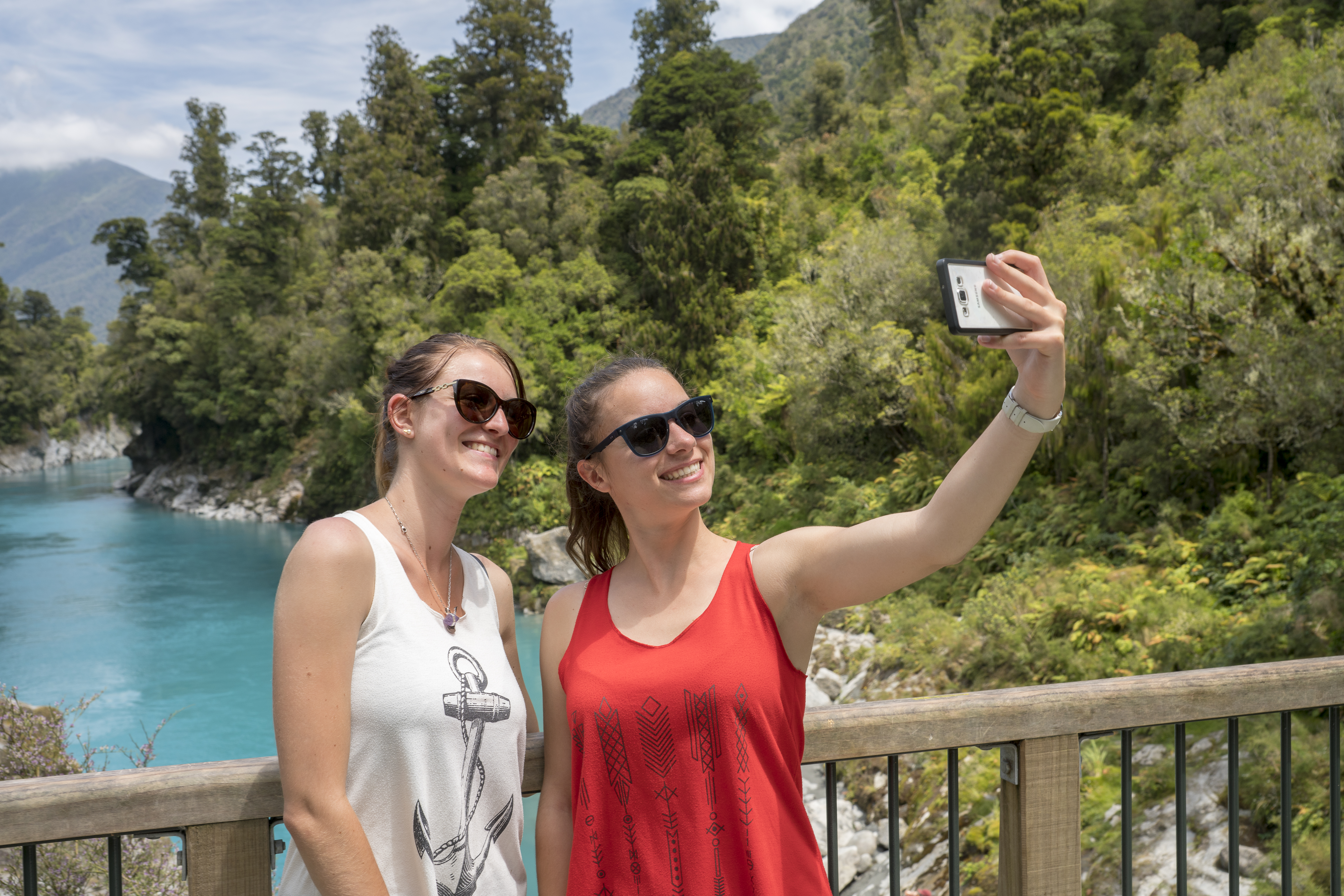
Two women posing for a joint selfie

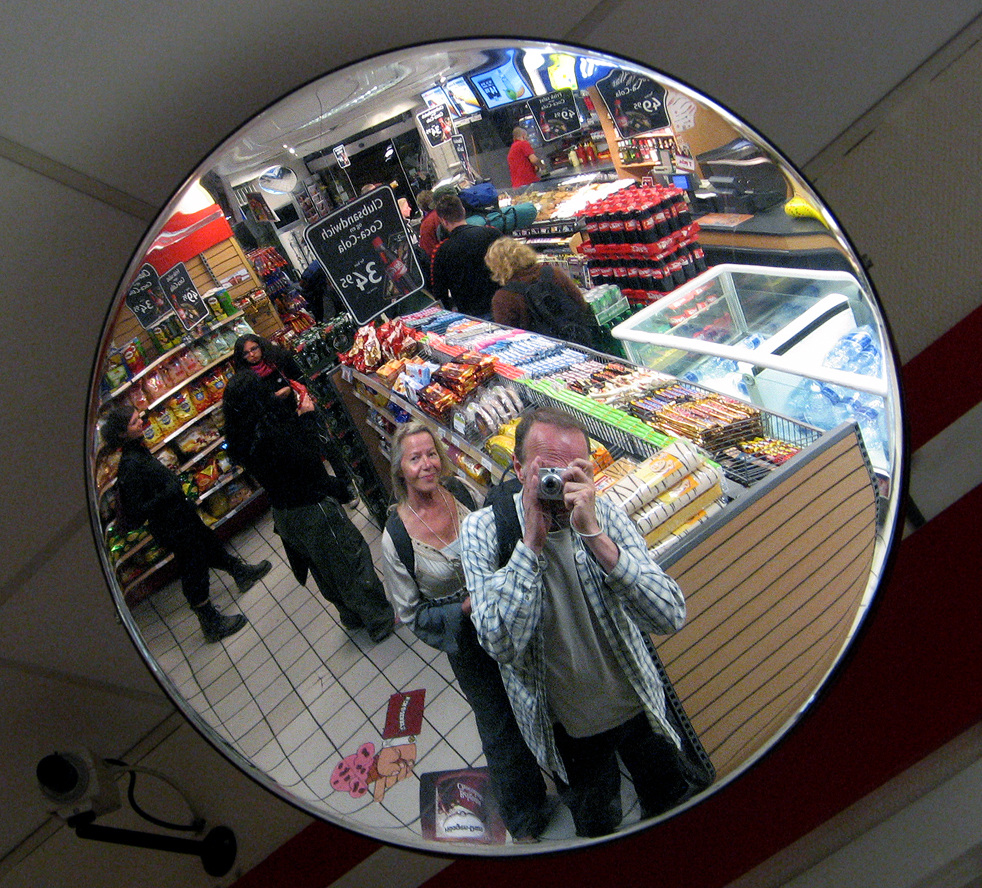
Selfie in a surveillance mirror

A selfie may include multiple subjects; as long as the photo is being taken by one of the subjects featured, it is considered a selfie. However, some other terms for a selfie featuring more than one person include usie, groufie, and wefie. Alternatively, one can take a mirror selfie, with the camera pointed at a mirror instead of directly at one's face, often to get a full-body shot.

== Etymology ==
"Selfie" is an example of hypocorism – a type of word formation that is popular in Australia, where it was in general use before gaining wider acceptance.

The first known use of the word selfie in any paper or electronic medium appeared in an Australian internet forum on 13 September 2002 – Karl Kruszelnicki's 'Dr Karl Self-Serve Science Forum' – in a post by Nathan Hope. Although Hope later dismissed the notion that he coined the term, describing it as "something that was just common slang at the time, used to describe a picture of yourself", he wrote the following: "Um, drunk at a mates 21st, I tripped ofer [sic] and landed lip first (with front teeth coming a very close second) on a set of steps. I had a hole about 1cm long right through my bottom lip. And sorry about the focus, it was a selfie."

By 2013, the word "selfie" had become commonplace enough to be monitored for inclusion in the online version of the Oxford English Dictionary, which announced it as the "word of the year" in November and gave it an Australian origin.

In August 2014, "selfie" was officially accepted for use in the word game Scrabble.

== Early history of self-portraits ==
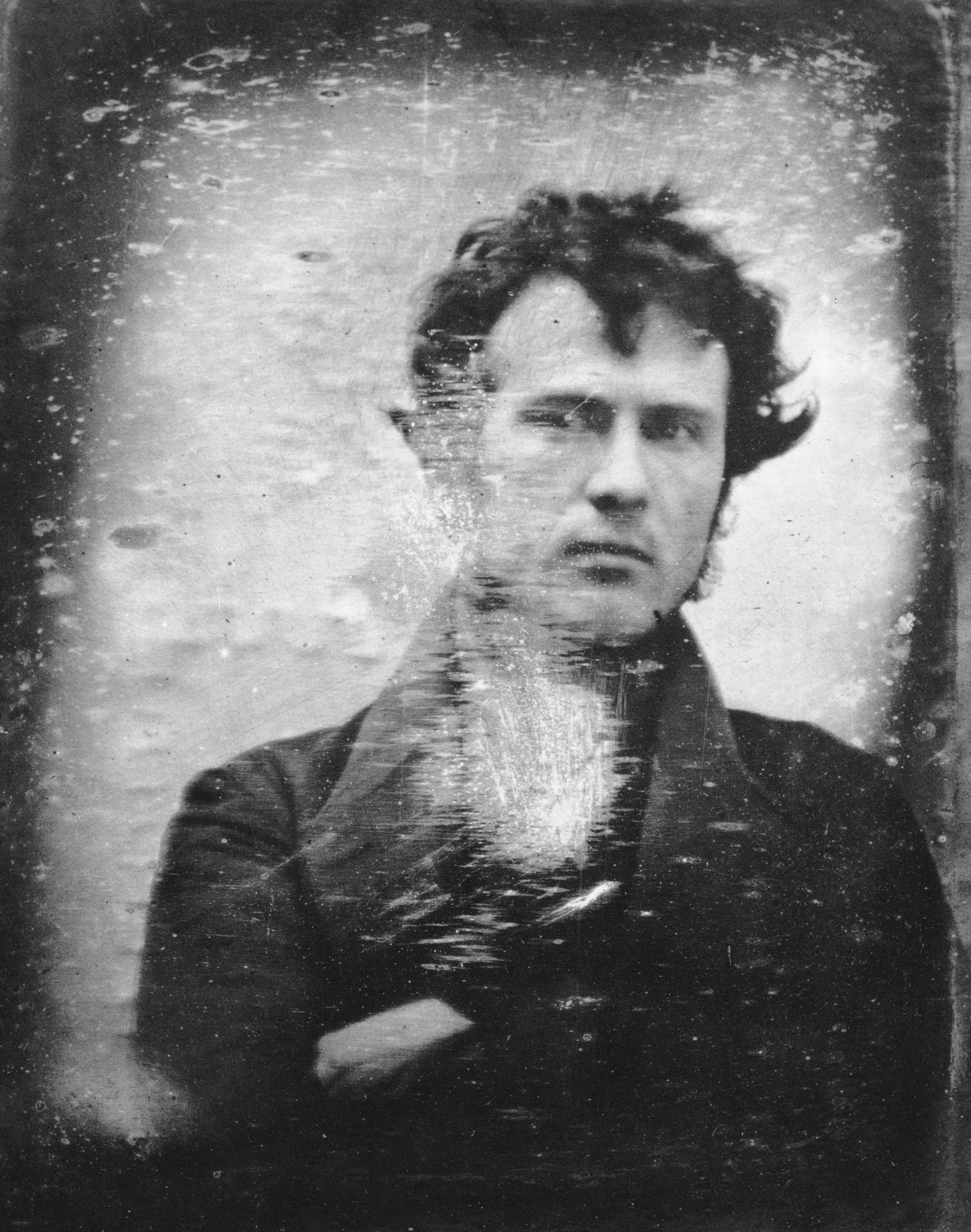
Photographic self-portrait by Robert Cornelius, 1839

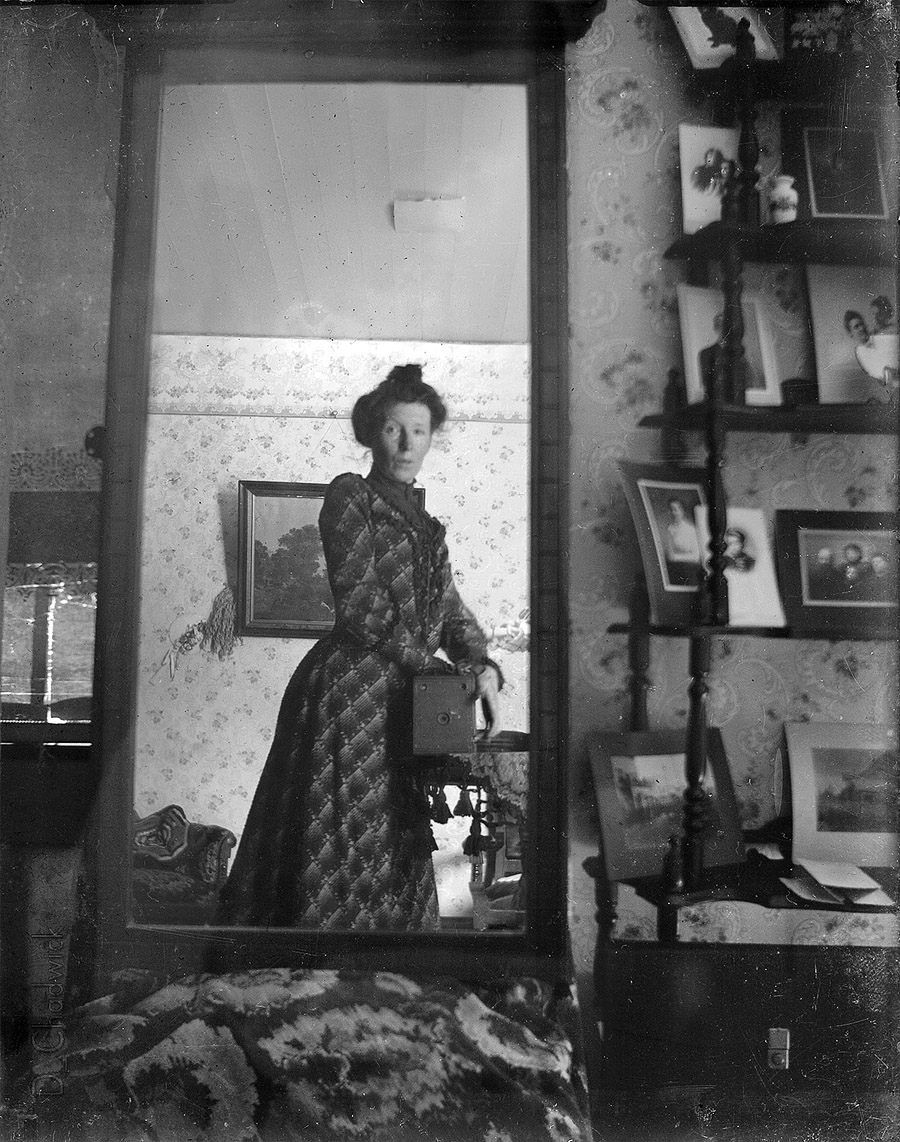
Unidentified woman taking her picture in a mirror, c. 1900

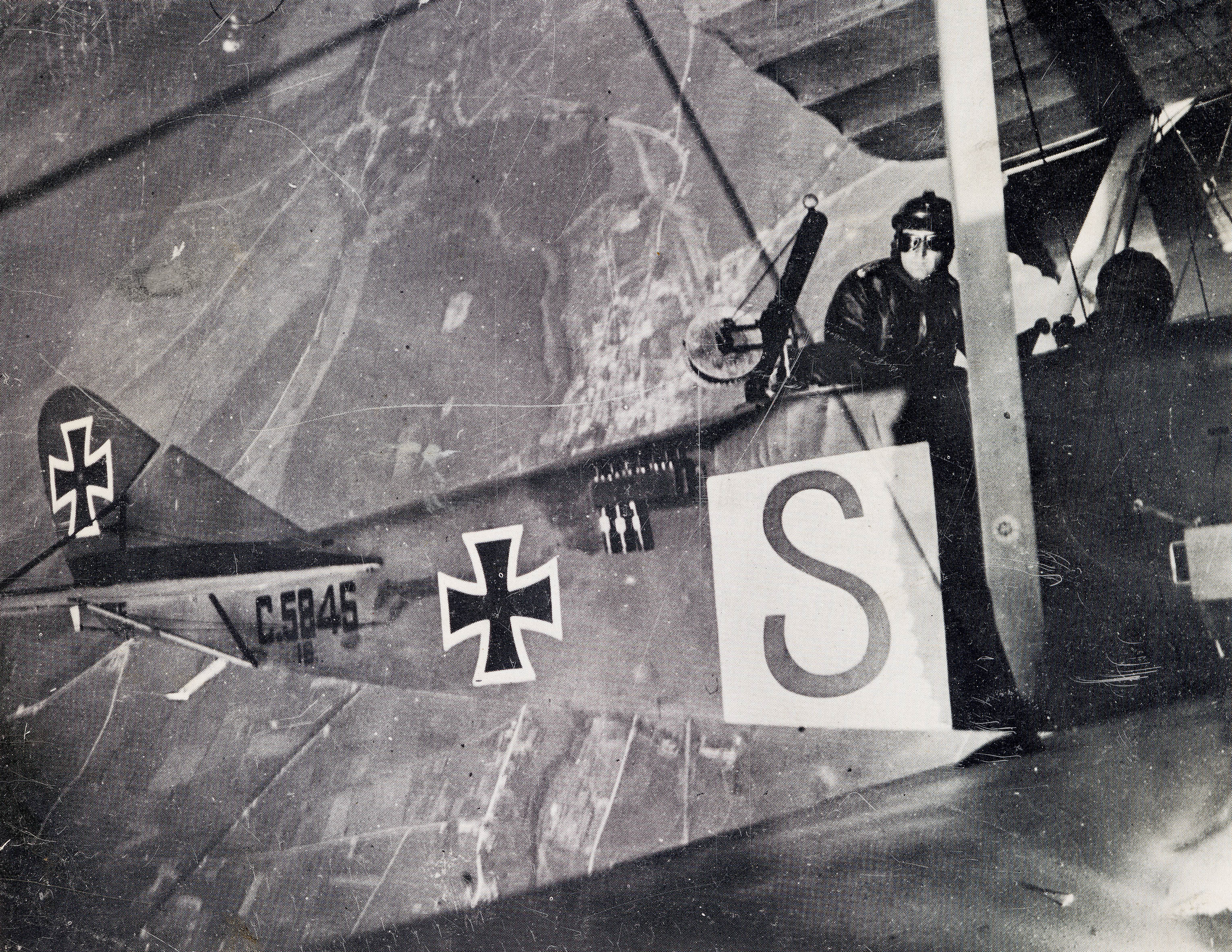
Crewman of a German World War I DFW C.V aircraft takes a picture with a camera attached to a wing-strut, 1916–1918.

In 1839, Robert Cornelius, an American pioneer in photography, produced a daguerreotype of himself which ended up as one of the first photographs of a person. Because the process was slow, he was able to uncover the lens, run into the shot for a minute or more, and then replace the lens cap. He recorded on the back "The first light picture ever taken. 1839." A copy of his "first selfie" graces his tombstone at Laurel Hill Cemetery in Philadelphia, Pennsylvania.

In 1900, the debut of the portable Kodak Brownie box camera led to photographic self-portraiture becoming a more widespread technique. The method was usually by mirror and stabilizing the camera either on a nearby object or on a tripod while framing via a viewfinder at the top of the box. Grand Duchess Anastasia Nikolaevna of Russia, at the age of 13, was one of the first teenagers to take her own picture using a mirror to send to a friend in 1914. In the letter that accompanied the photograph, she wrote, "I took this picture of myself looking at the mirror. It was very hard as my hands were trembling." In 1934, a Swedish couple used a wooden stick to take the photo of themselves, which the New York Times called "the original selfie stick".

During the 1970s, photographic self-portraiture flourished when affordable instant cameras birthed a new medium of self-expression, capturing uncharacteristically personal insight into otherwise conservative individuals and allowing amateurs to learn photography with immediate results. This practice transitioned naturally across to digital cameras as they supplanted film cameras around the turn of the millennium.

== Origins and development of selfie-taking ==
=== Japanese selfie culture ===
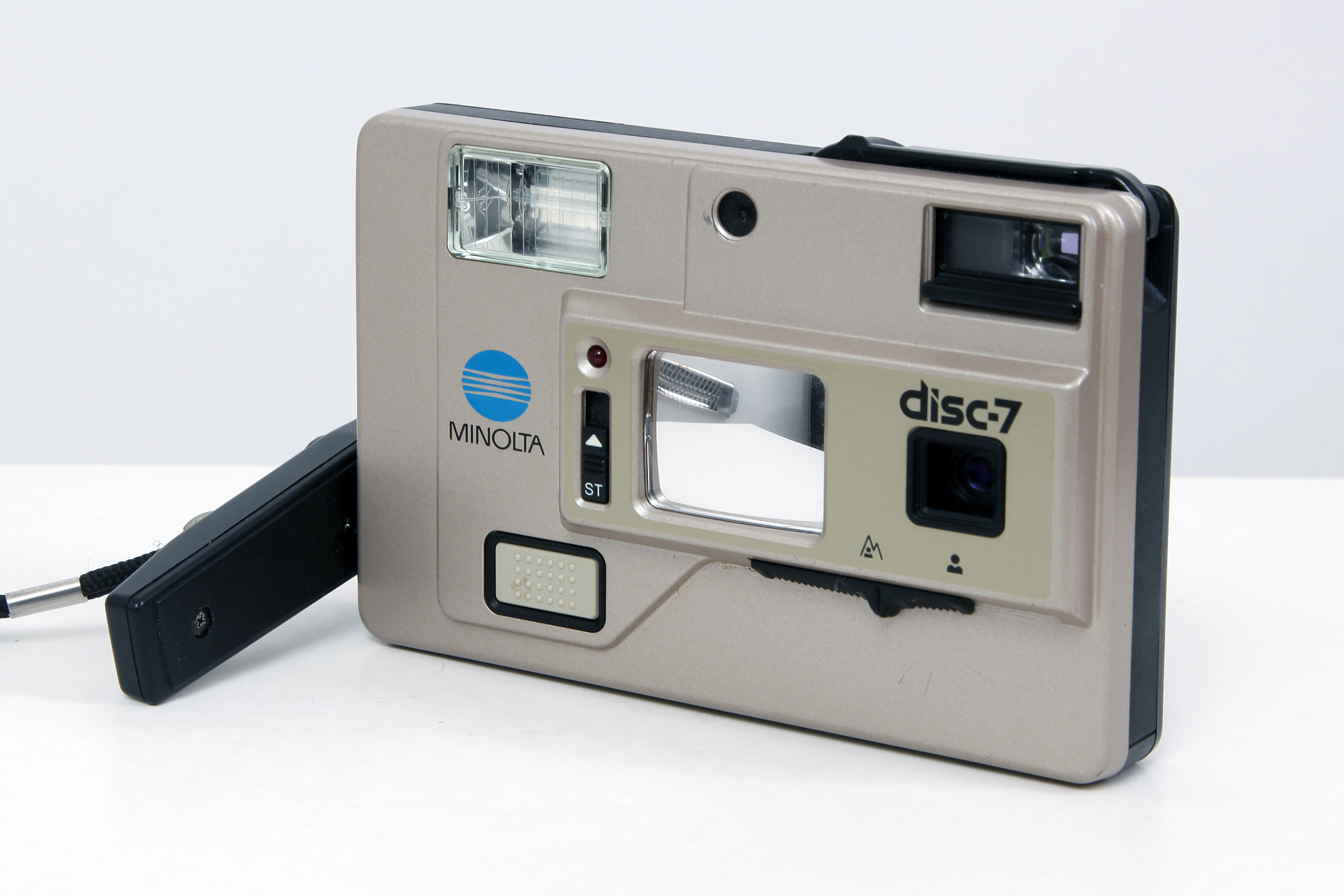
MINOLTA disc-7 with selfie mirror (1983)

The modern selfie has origins in Japanese kawaii (cute) culture, which involves an obsession with beautifying self-representation in photographic forms, particularly among females. By the 1990s, self-photography developed into a major preoccupation among Japanese schoolgirls, who took photos with friends and exchanged copies that could be pasted into kawaii albums. This inspired a young photographer, Hiromix (Hiromi Toshikawa), to publish a photo diary album called Seventeen Girl Days, which included a number of self-posing photos. One of these was a pioneering selfie that was shot while holding the camera in front of herself. She rose to fame in Japan when her album received recognition from camera manufacturer Canon in 1995.

The 1983 Minolta Disc-7 camera had a convex mirror on its front to allow the composition of self-portraits, and its packaging showed the camera mounted on a stick while used for such a purpose. A "telescopic extender" for compact handheld cameras was patented by Ueda Hiroshi and Mima Yujiro in 1983, and a selfie stick was featured in a 1995 book of 101 Un-Useless Japanese Inventions. While dismissed as a "useless invention" at the time, the selfie stick later gained global popularity in the early 21st century.

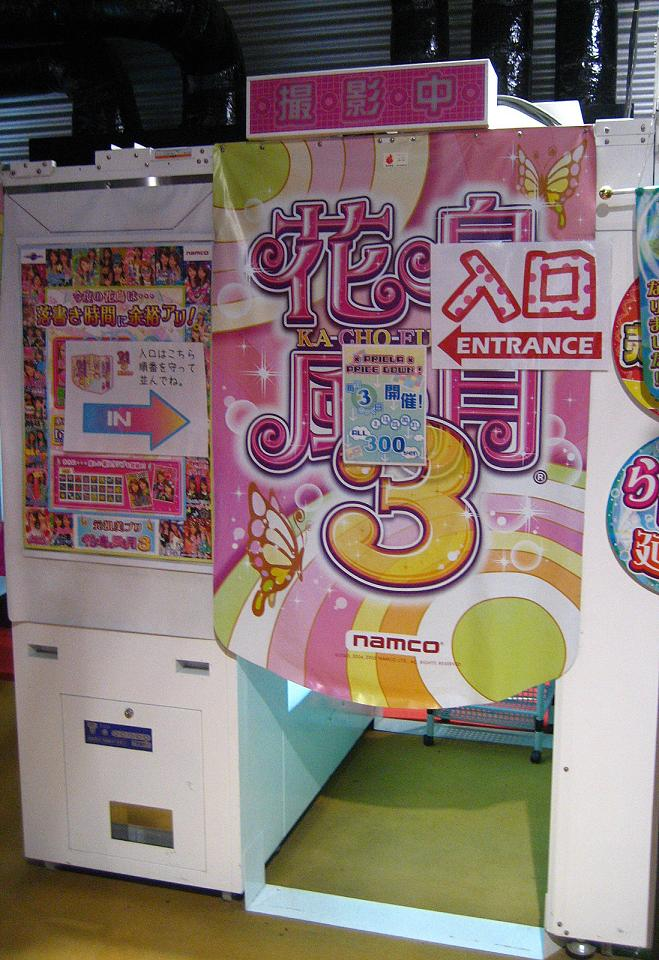
A purikura photo sticker booth in Fukushima City in 2007. The first purikura was introduced by Sega and Atlus in 1995.

The digital selfie originates from the purikura (Japanese shorthand for "print club"), which are Japanese photo sticker booths, introduced by the Japanese video game arcade industry in the mid-1990s. It was conceived in 1994 by Sasaki Miho, inspired by the popularity of girl photo culture and photo stickers in 1990s Japan. She worked for a game company, Atlus, where she suggested the idea, but it was initially rejected by her male bosses. Atlus eventually decided to pursue Miho's idea, and developed it with the help of a leading Japanese video game company, Sega, which later became the owner of Atlus. Sega and Atlus introduced the Print Club (Purinto Kurabu), the first purikura, in February 1995, initially at game arcades, before expanding to other popular culture locations such as fast food shops, train stations, karaoke establishments, and bowling alleys. The success of the original Sega-Atlus machine led to other Japanese arcade game companies producing their own purikura, including SNK's Neo Print in 1996 and Konami's Puri Puri Campus (Print Print Campus) in 1997.

Purikura produced what would later be called selfies. A purikura is essentially a cross between a traditional license/passport photo booth and an arcade video game, with a computer that is connected to a colour video camera and colour printer, and which allows the manipulation of digital images. It involves users posing in front of a camera within the compact booth, having their images taken, and then printing the photos with various effects designed to look kawaii. It presents a series of choices, such as desired backdrops, borders, insertable decorations, icons, text writing options, hair extensions, twinkling diamond tiaras, tenderized light effects, and predesigned decorative margins. Purikura became a popular form of entertainment among youths in Japan, and then across East Asia, in the 1990s. These photographic filters were similar to the Snapchat filters that later appeared in the 2010s. Photographic features in purikura were later adopted by smartphone apps such as Instagram and Snapchat, including scribbling graffiti or typing text over selfies, adding features that beautify the image, and photo editing options such as cat whiskers or bunny ears.

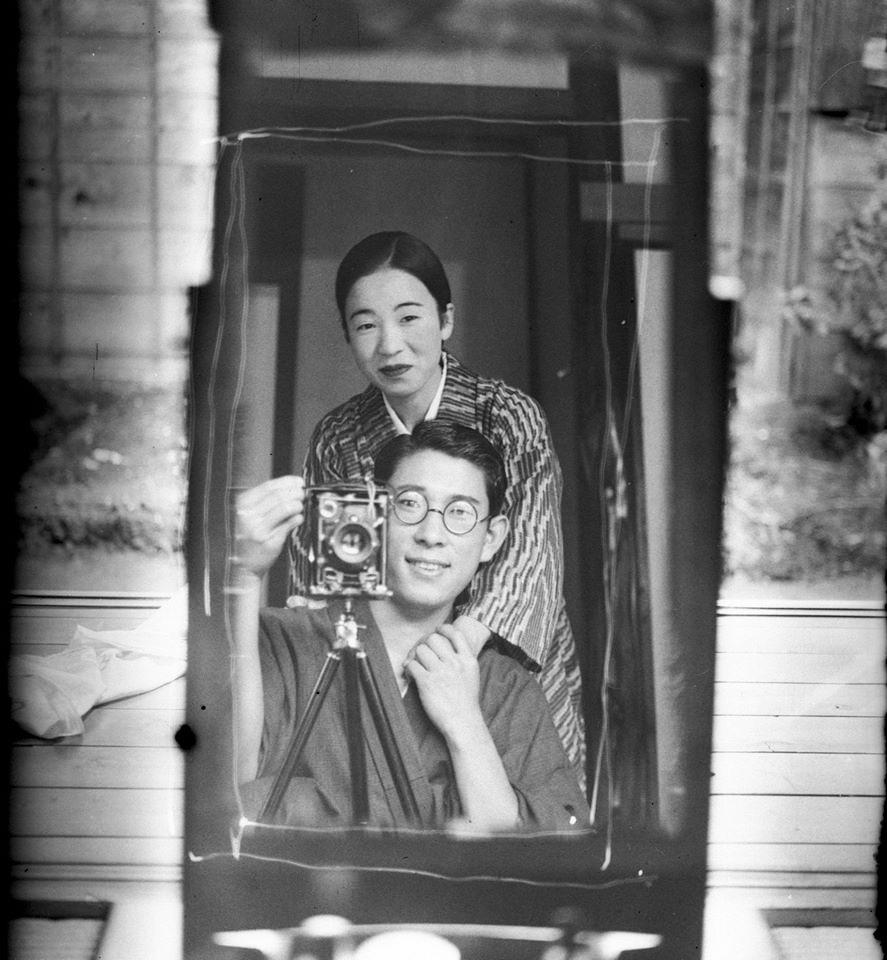
A Japanese couple taking a selfie together, 1920s

To capitalize on the purikura phenomenon in East Asia, Japanese mobile phones began including a front-facing camera, which facilitated the creation of selfies. Perhaps the first front-facing camera on a hand-held device was the Game Boy Camera, released in Japan in February 1998. The Game Boy Camera was an attachment for Game Boy. The 180°-swivel camera was specifically marketed to allow users to take self-portraits. The first front-facing camera phone was the Kyocera Visual Phone VP-210, released in Japan in May 1999. It was called a "mobile videophone" at the time. It stored up to 20 JPEG images, which could be sent over e-mail, or the phone could send up to two images per second over Japan's Personal Handy-phone System (PHS) Wireless cellular network. This led to a transition in Japanese selfie culture from purikura to mobile phones.

=== International popularity ===
Selfie culture became popular in Japan and then other East Asian countries in the 1990s, starting with purikura booths and then front-facing camera phones. However, it was not until the 2000s that selfie culture was popularized outside of East Asia.

Outside of East Asia, the concept of uploading group self-taken photographs to the Internet, albeit with a disposable camera instead of a smartphone, dates back to a webpage created by Australians in September 2001, including photos taken in the late 1990s (captured by the Internet Archive in April 2004).

In the early 2000s, before Facebook became the dominant online social network, self-taken photographs were particularly common on MySpace. However, writer Kate Losse recounts that between 2006 and 2009 (when Facebook became more popular than MySpace), the "MySpace pic" (typically "an amateurish, flash-blinded self-portrait, often taken in front of a bathroom mirror") became an indication of bad taste for users of the newer Facebook social network. In 2009 in the image hosting and video hosting website Flickr, Flickr users used 'selfies' to describe seemingly endless self-portraits posted by teenagers. According to Losse, improvements in design—especially the front-facing camera of the iPhone 4 (2010), mobile photo apps such as Instagram and Snapchat led to the resurgence of selfies in the early 2010s.

The Sony Ericsson Z1010 mobile phone, released in late 2003, introduced to Western markets the concept of a front-facing camera, which could be used for selfies and video calls. These cameras became common on mobile devices, such as the iPhone 4 (2010). The iPhone 4, which adopted the front-facing camera feature from earlier Japanese and Korean phones, helped popularize the selfie internationally, outside of East Asia.

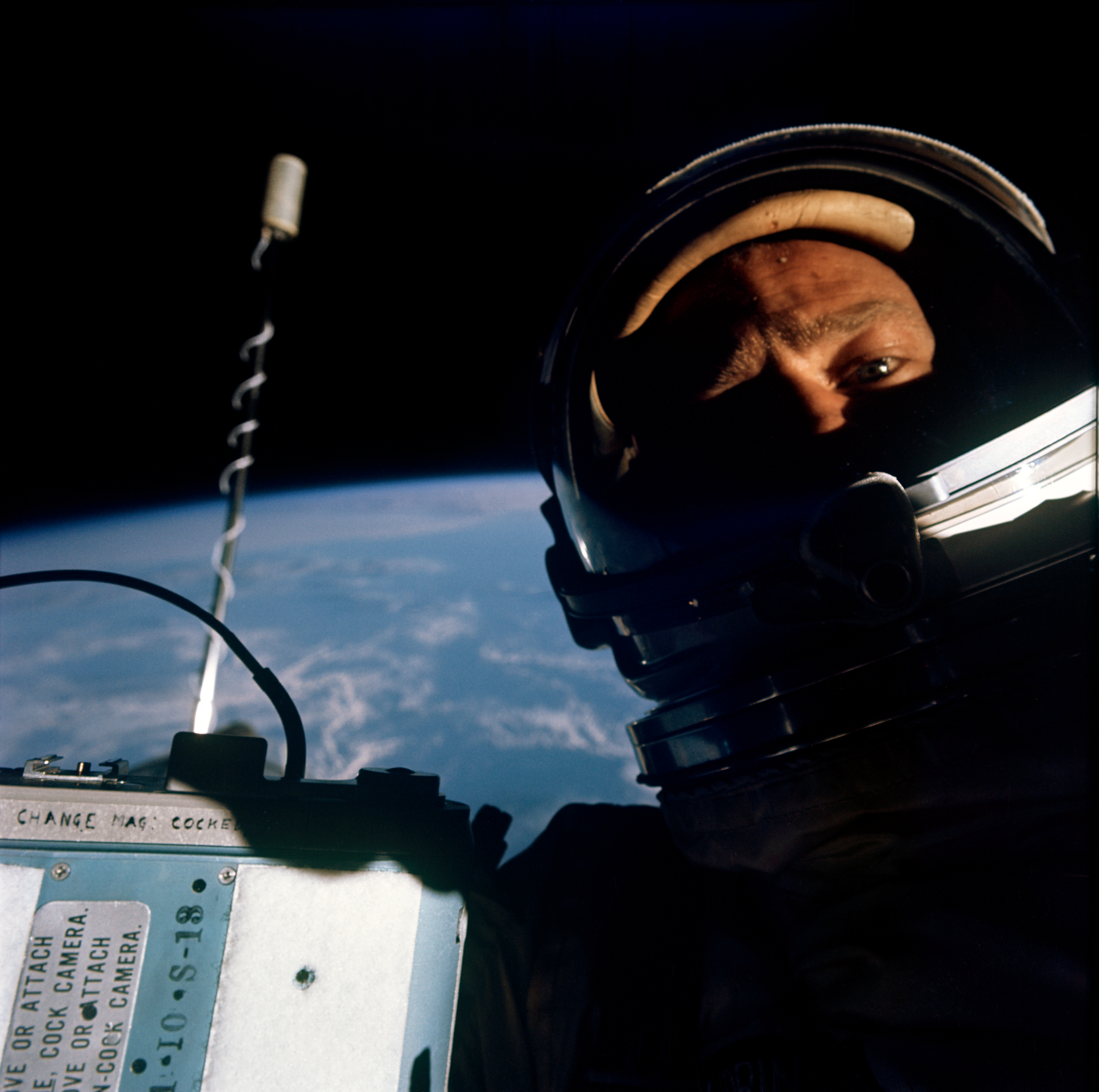
Buzz Aldrin took the first EVA selfie in 1966, using a Hasselblad roll-film camera.

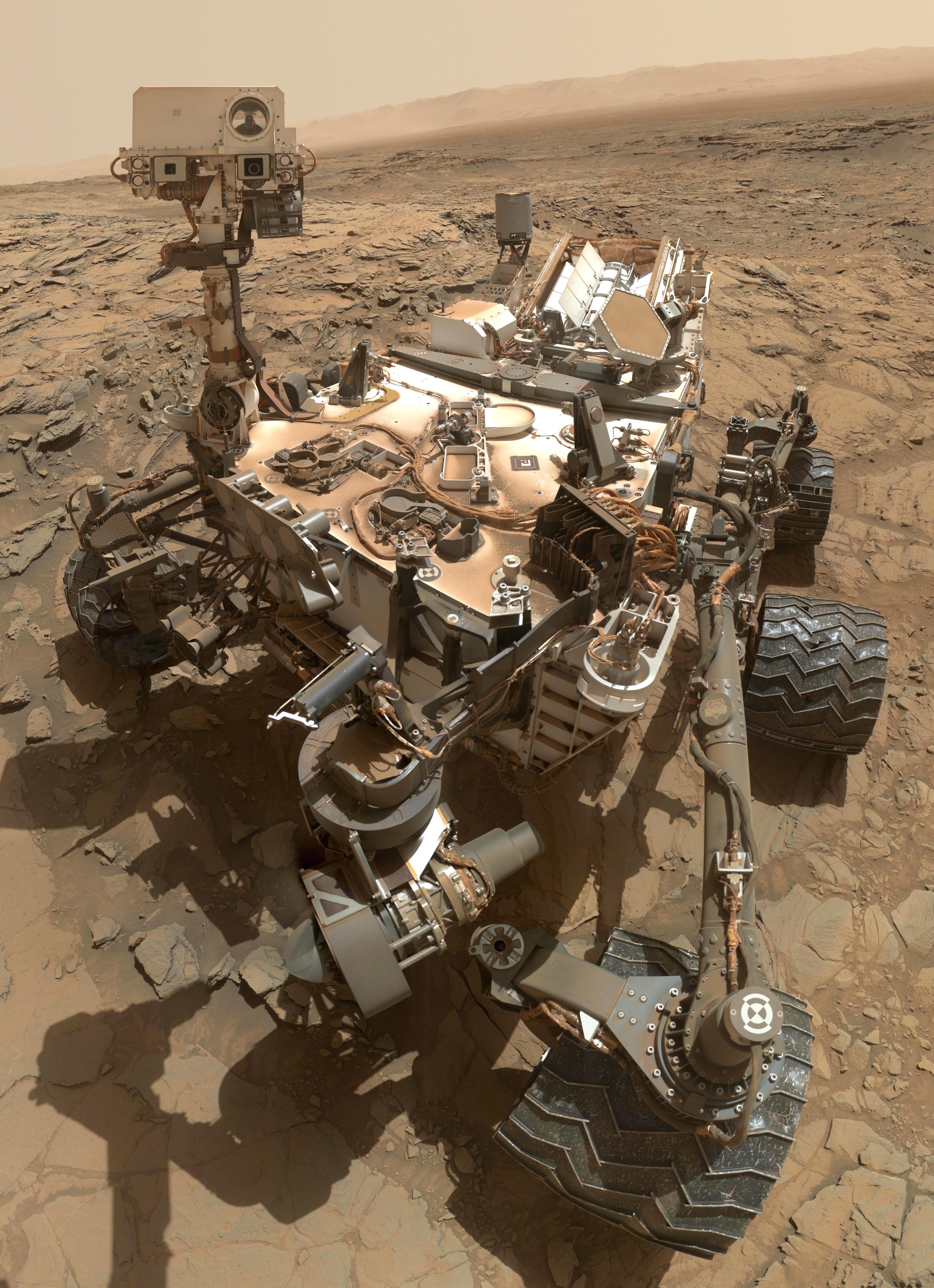
Curiosity rover's self portrait at Mount Sharp, Mars, 2015

In 2011, the Instagram photo-sharing and social networking service introduced auto filters, allowing users to easily alter their photos. Initially popular with young people, selfies gained wider popularity over time. Life and business coach Jennifer Lee, in January 2011, was the first person to coin "#Selfie" as a hashtag on Instagram. By the end of 2012, Time magazine considered selfie one of the "top 10 buzzwords" of that year; although selfies had existed long before, it was in 2012 that the term "really hit the big time". According to a 2013 survey, two-thirds of Australian women age 18–35 take selfies—the most common purpose for which is posting on Facebook. A poll commissioned by smartphone and camera maker Samsung in 2013 found that selfies made up 30% of the photos taken by people aged 18–24.

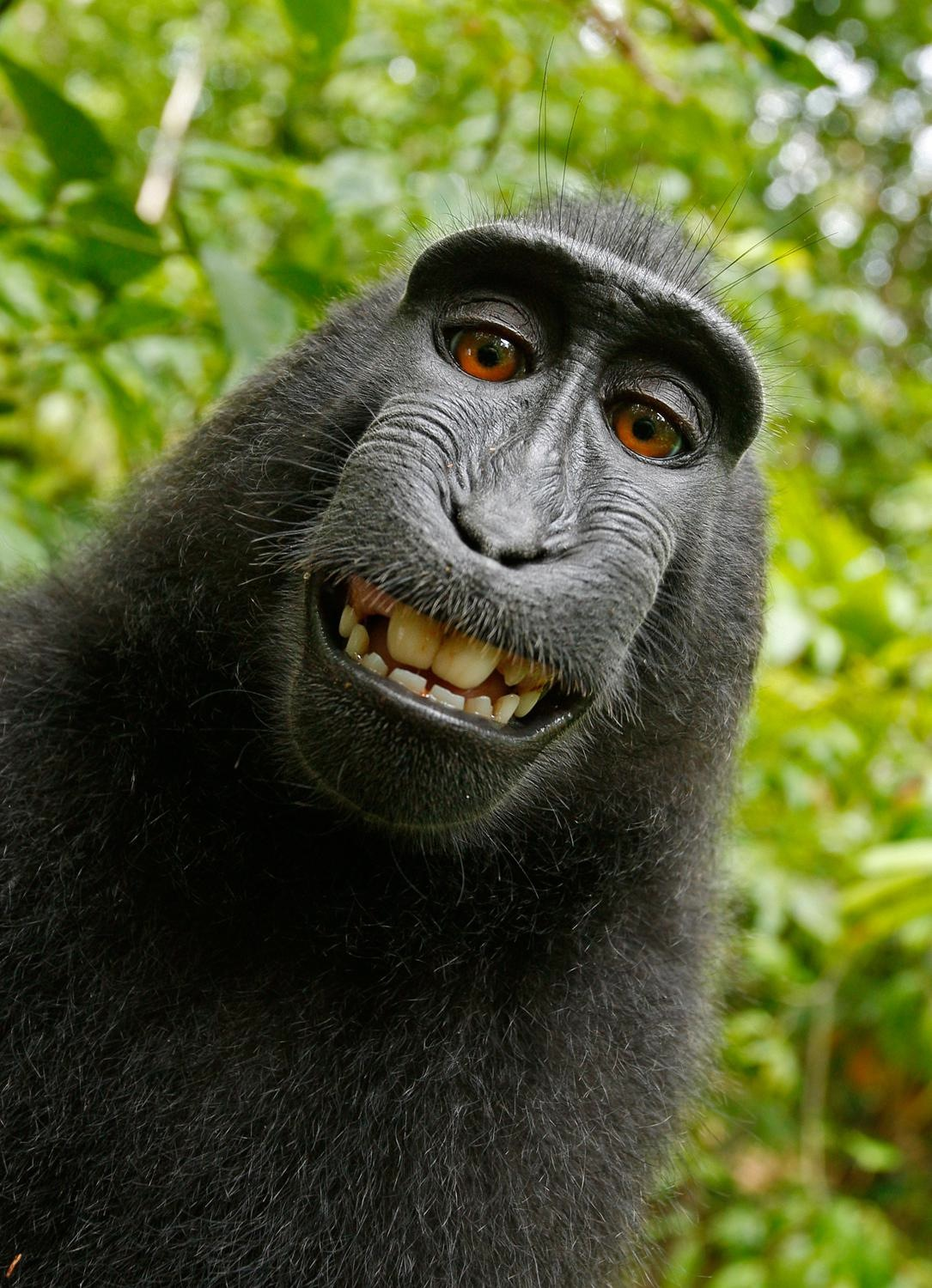
"Monkey selfie" of a macaque who had picked up a camera

Selfies have also been taken beyond Earth. Selfies taken in space include those by astronauts, an image by NASA's Curiosity rover of itself on Mars, and images created by an indirect method, where a self-portrait photograph taken on Earth is displayed on a screen on a satellite, and captured by a camera.

In 2011, a crested black macaque pressed a trigger on a wildlife photographer's camera, set up in an Indonesian jungle for that specific purpose; when the camera was later recovered it was found to contain hundreds of selfies, including one of a grinning female macaque. This incident set off an unusual debate about copyright. In April 2013, the Wikipedia's Selfie page started. In 2016, a federal judge ruled that the monkey cannot own the copyright to the images.

In describing the popularity of the "foot selfie", a photograph taken of one's feet while sunbathing at exotic locations, The Hollywood Reporter said that it could be "2014's social media pose to beat".

In January 2014, during the Sochi Winter Olympics, a "Selfie Olympics" meme was popular on Twitter, where users took self-portraits in unusual situations. The spread of the meme took place with the usage of the hashtags #selfiegame and #selfieolympics.

=== Social media popularity ===
Social media apps like Instagram and Snapchat encourage people to take selfies with features like Geofilters, hashtag linking of related topics, and picture stories. Geofilters allow people to take selfies with overlays that can be comedic, altering your selfie image with the ability to show where you are located. In September 2017, Instagram boasted 500 million daily active users of its self-promotion, selfie-sharing app and 800 million monthly active users. Snapchat reports 178 million daily active users of its service. As of July 2017, in order of popularity, the four most popular social networking services are Facebook, Facebook Messenger, Instagram, and Snapchat.

Selfies have been popular on social media. Instagram has over 53 million photos tagged with the hashtag #selfie. The word "selfie" was mentioned in Facebook status updates over 368,000 times during a one-week period in October 2013. During the same period on Twitter, the hashtag #selfie was used in more than 150,000 tweets.

== Sociology ==
The appeal of selfies comes from how easy they are to create and share, and the control they give people over how they present themselves. Many selfies are intended to present a flattering image of the person, especially to friends whom the photographer expects to be supportive. Those selfies would be taken on trips, during activities that are considered interesting or as a group selfie with interesting or attractive people. However, a 2013 study of Facebook users found that posting photos of oneself correlates with lower levels of social support from and intimacy with Facebook friends (except for those marked as Close Friends). The lead author of the study suggests that "those who frequently post photographs on Facebook risk damaging real-life relationships." The photo messaging application Snapchat is also largely used to send selfies. Some users of Snapchat choose to send intentionally-unattractive selfies to their friends for comedic purposes.

Posting intentionally unattractive selfies has also become common in the early 2010s—in part for their humor value, but in some cases also to explore issues of body image or as a reaction against the perceived narcissism or over-sexualization of typical selfies.

The practice of taking selfies has been criticised not only for being narcissistic, preventing assessment and appreciation of what is happening in the present, but also for being mindlessly conformist behaviour, when everyone does what everyone else is doing, "like that scene in The Life of Brian – where the crowd gathers outside Brian's window and enthusiastically chants in unison: 'Yes, we're all individuals! ... Yes, we are all different!'" However, this has been disproved by more nuanced and detailed analyses of the genre.

The pop-up museum called The Museum of Selfies is scheduled to open its doors to all selfie lovers in the year 2018 in Glendale, a suburb of Los Angeles County, California.

=== Gender roles, sexuality, and privacy ===
Sociologist Ben Agger describes the trend of selfies as "the male gaze gone viral", and sociologist and women's studies professor Gail Dines links it to the rise of "porn culture" and the idea that sexual attractiveness is the only way in which a woman can make herself visible. Feminist writer Megan Murphy has pointed out that posting images publicly or sharing them with others who do so may have a dramatic effect in the case of revenge porn, where ex-lovers post sexually explicit photographs or nude selfies to exact revenge or humiliate their former lovers. Nonetheless, some feminists view selfies as a subversive form of self-expression that narrates one's own view of desirability. In this sense, selfies can be positive and offer a way of actively asserting agency.

In 2013 in the blog Jezebel, author Erin Gloria Ryan criticized selfies, believing that the images they often portray, as well as the fact that they are usually posted to social media with the intent of getting positive comments and "likes", reinforce the "notion that the most valuable thing [a young woman] has to offer the world is her looks." The Jezebel post provoked commentary on Twitter from users arguing that selfies could be positive for women by promoting different standards of beauty. Media critic Jennifer Pozner saw selfies as particularly powerful for women and girls who did not see themselves portrayed in mainstream media.

Research shows that there is a particular difference between perspectives of youngsters and adults. "While not all representative of all young people's experiences of digital picture-sharing cultures, these discussions point to a significant gap between young people's own interpretations of their ordinary or everyday digital practices and adults' interpretations of these practices."

=== Celebrity selfies ===
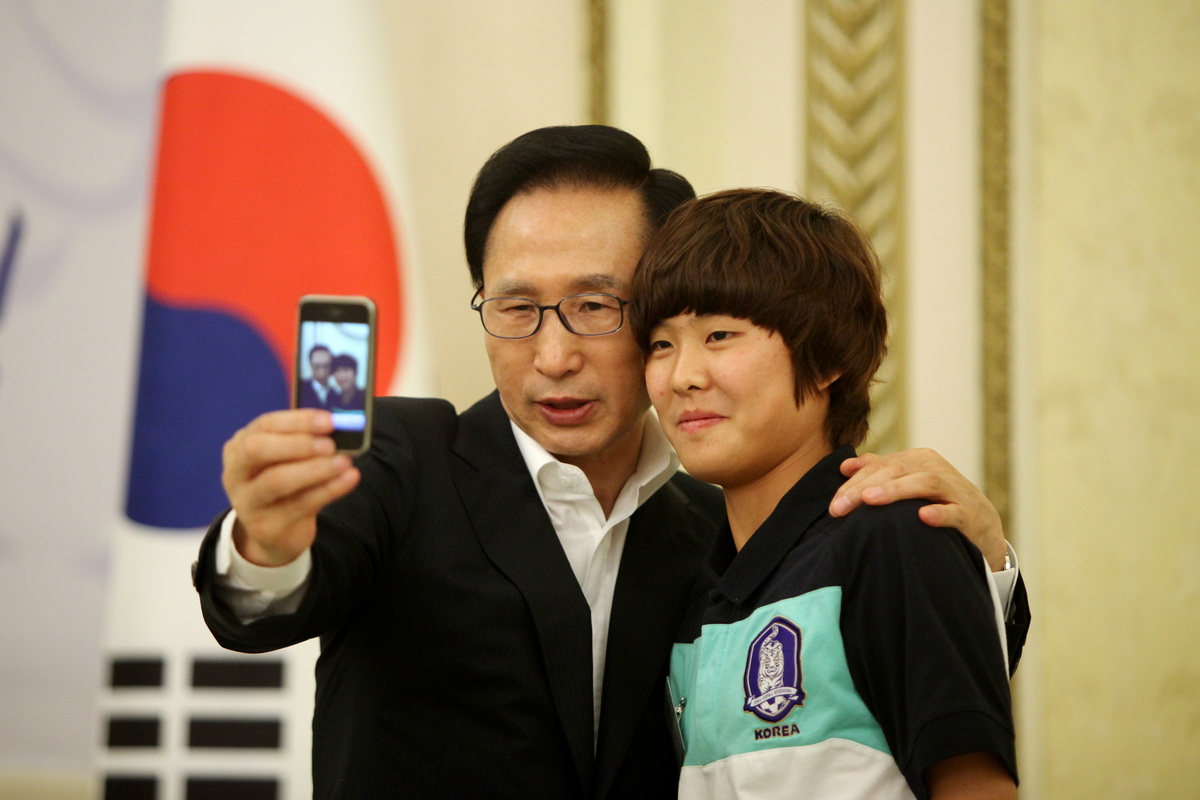
South Korean president Lee Myung-bak and footballer Ji So-yun

Many celebrities – especially sex symbols – post selfies for their followers on social media, and provocative or otherwise interesting celebrity selfies are the subject of regular press coverage. Some commentators, such as Emma Barnett of The Telegraph, have argued that sexy celebrity selfies (and sexy non-celebrity selfies) can be empowering to the selfie-takers but harmful to women in general as they promote viewing women as sex objects. Actor and avid selfie poster James Franco wrote an op-ed for The New York Times defending this frequent use of selfies on his Instagram page. Franco defends the self-portrait stating they should not be seen as an egocentric act, but instead a journalistic moment as the selfie "quickly and easily shows, not tells, how you're feeling, where you are, what you're doing" in a way that a text communication might fail to convey.

A selfie orchestrated during the 86th Academy Awards by host Ellen DeGeneres, dubbed the "Oscars selfie", was, at one point, the most retweeted tweet ever. DeGeneres said she wanted to pay homage to Meryl Streep's record 18 Oscar nominations by setting a new record with her, and invited twelve other Oscar celebrities to join them, which included Meryl Streep, Julia Roberts, Channing Tatum, Bradley Cooper, Kevin Spacey, Angelina Jolie, Brad Pitt, Lupita Nyong'o, Jared Leto, and Jennifer Lawrence. The resulting photo of the celebrities broke the previous retweet record within forty minutes, and was retweeted over 1.8 million times in the first hour. By the end of the ceremony it had been retweeted over 2 million times; less than 24 hours later, it had been retweeted over 2.8 million times. It beat the previous record, 778,801, which was held by Barack Obama, following his victory in the 2012 presidential election.

=== Political selfies ===
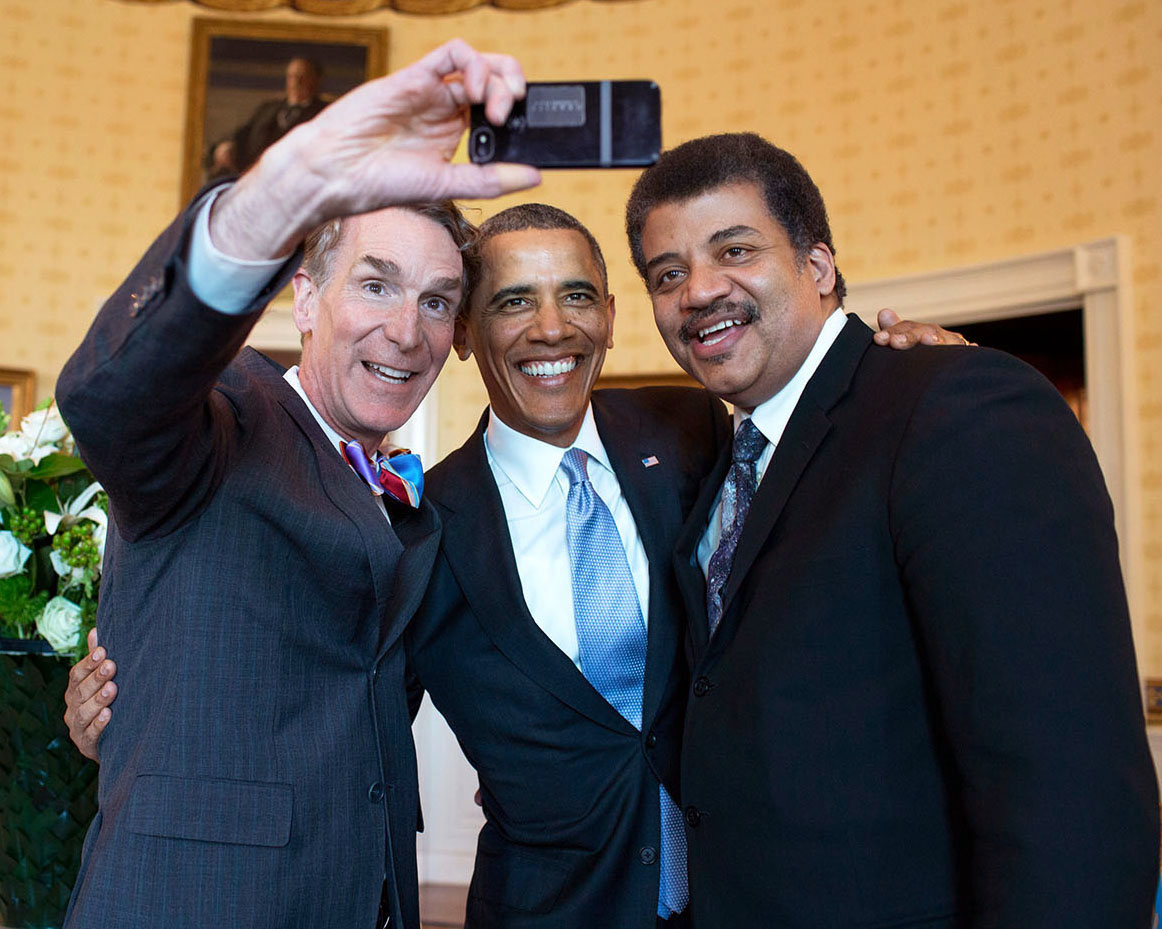
Bill Nye takes a selfie with US president Barack Obama and Neil deGrasse Tyson at the White House, 2014.

United States president Barack Obama made news headlines during Nelson Mandela's memorial celebration at Johannesburg's FNB Stadium with various world leaders, as he was snapped taking a selfie and sharing smiles with Danish prime minister Helle Thorning-Schmidt, and later with British prime minister David Cameron, as they gathered to pay tribute to Mandela. The decision to take the selfies was considered to be in poor taste, as British political columnist Iain Martin critiqued the behaviour as "clowning around like muppets". The photos also depict the First Lady Michelle Obama sitting next to them looking "furious and mortified". Despite the criticism, Roberto Schmidt, the photographer who captured the photos taken at the celebration, reported to the Today show it was taken at "a jovial, celebratory portion of the service".

In India, BJP Prime Ministerial candidate Narendra Modi posted a selfie on Twitter after voting in Gandhinagar, India. The post became a major trending item on the micro-blogging platform. In July 2014, the Swiss government became the first to take and post a picture of an entire national government (the picture was taken by one of the seven members of the government, Alain Berset).

The Portuguese president Marcelo Rebelo de Sousa is known to pose for several selfies in public appearances, once even claiming to have posed for "over 1500 selfies" in three days, during which he estimated to have greeted about four thousand people – the social media phenomenon has coined the term "Marcelfie" to refer to these. Most notably, the President posed for a selfie with Prime Minister António Costa in the Paris City Hall, during the Portugal Day ceremonies there on 10 June 2016.

=== Group selfies ===
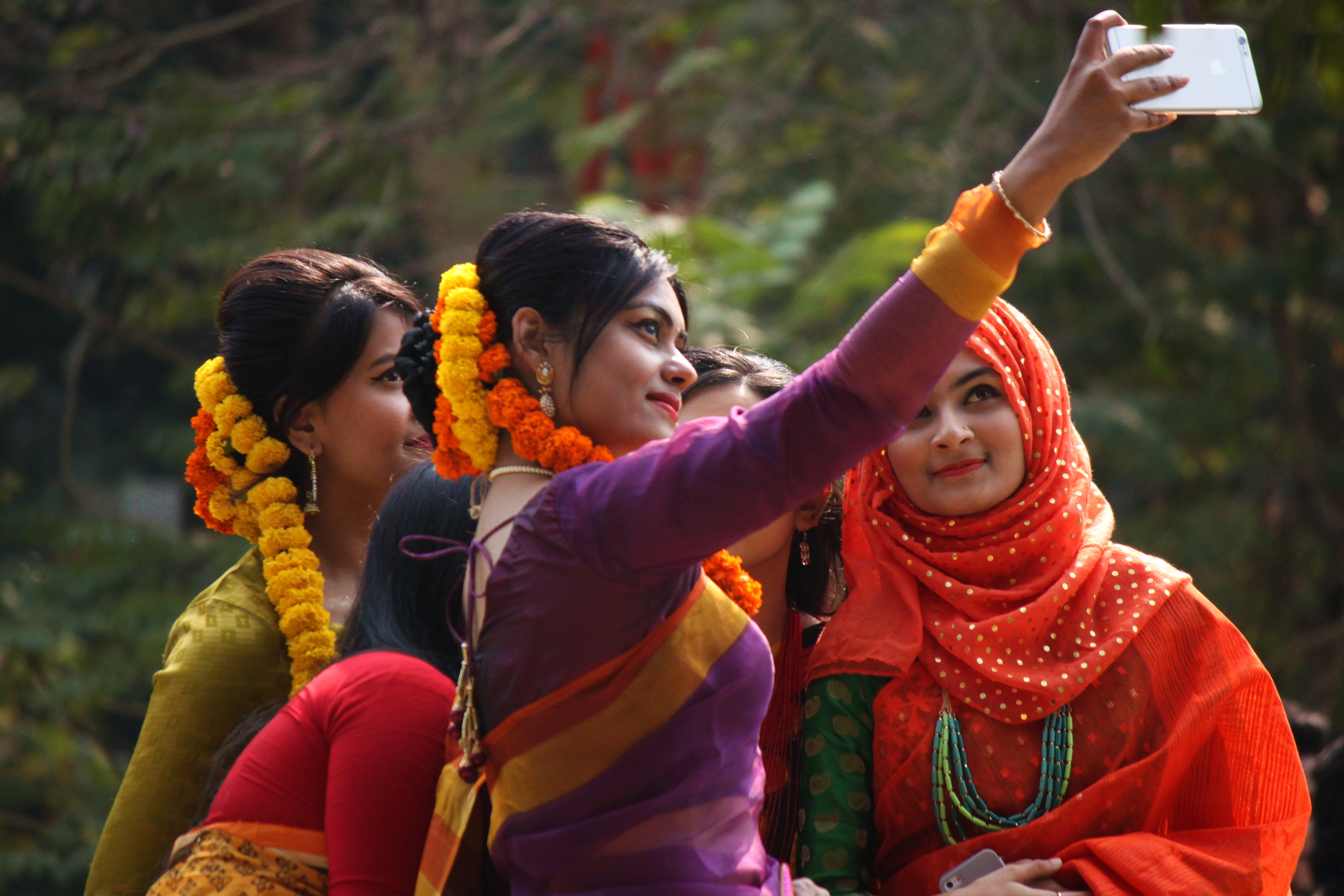
Bangladeshi girls taking group selfie at Pohela Falgun

In January 2014, Business Insider published a story referring to selfies of groups as usies. A photograph of Pope Francis with visitors to the Vatican was called an usie by The Daily Dot, and TMZ has used the term to describe a selfie taken of celebrity couple Justin Bieber and Selena Gomez.

The term "groufie" has been trademarked by Chinese phone manufacturer Huawei Technologies in China, France, Germany, Russia, and the United States. The word was introduced during the launch of its Ascend P7 smartphone in 2014. Huawei defines the groufie as a panoramic selfie involving multiple subjects, as well as background scenery, captured using the front facing, 8-megapixel camera and panorama capabilities of its phones.

Another term for a group selfie is "wefie", originally trademarked by Samsung in the US to promote the wide-angle lens of its NX series of cameras.

=== Accessories ===
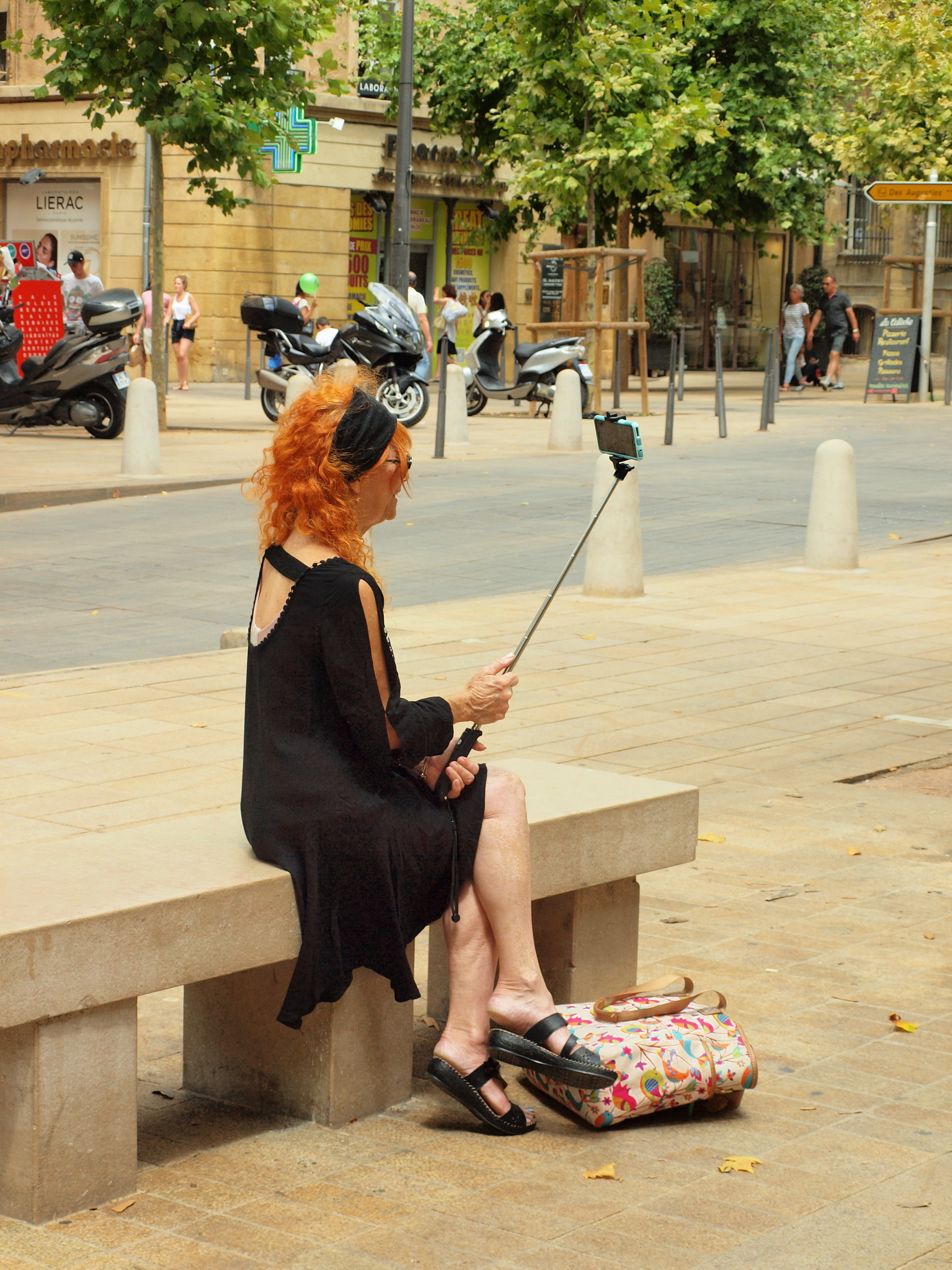
Woman taking a selfie using a selfie stick

Devices for holding smartphones or compact cameras called selfie sticks are often used when taking group selfies, as they allow a wider, more panoramic image capture.

Another option for taking selfies from a distance beyond one's arm is a drone. Selfies made with a drone are also called dronies. The concept of taking a dronie first entered the mainstream in 2014 and coincided with a relatively sudden increase in the availability of relatively cheap, camera bearing multicopter drones. In 2014, the Nixie drone was designed to serve as a "personal photographer".

== Psychology and neuroscience ==
According to a study performed by Nicola Bruno and Marco Bertamini at the University of Parma, selfies by non-professional photographers show a slight bias for showing the left cheek of the selfie-taker. This is similar to observations of portraits by professional painters from many historical periods and styles, indicating that the left cheek bias may be rooted in asymmetries of brain lateralization that are well documented within cognitive neuroscience. In a second study, the same group tested if selfie takers without training in photography spontaneously adhere to widely prescribed rules of photographic composition, such as the rule of thirds. The study found that they do not, suggesting that these rules may be conventional rather than hardwired in the brain's perceptual preferences.

A 2016 study examining the relationship between personality and selfie-posting behaviours suggests that extroversion and social exhibitionism positively predict frequency of selfie posting, whereas self-esteem is generally unrelated to selfie-posting behaviours.

Selfitis is a condition described as the obsessive taking of selfies, although it is currently not listed as a mental disorder in the DSM-5.

Obsessive taking of selfies and posting to social media has been found to be linked to many symptoms common to mental disorders. These include narcissism, low self-esteem, loneliness, self-centredness, and attention-seeking behaviours.

=== Facial distortion effect ===
Because they are typically taken much closer to the subject's face than a conventional photograph, phone selfies tend to distort the subject's face. When conventional photographers take headshots, they typically use a narrower lens (or zoom in) and stand at a normal distance, instead of getting physically closer to the subject's face. Front-facing cell phone cameras, on the other hand, feature wide-angle lenses and are held closer to the face, since the human arm is only so long. This results in extension distortion, where objects closer to the camera appear much larger than they actually are. Though this distortion has a slimming effect, it also exaggerates the auto-photographer's nose and chin, since those parts are closer to the camera than the rest of the face.

A study published by the American Academy of Facial Plastic and Reconstructive Surgery has found that selfies have altered people's perception of their faces to the point where they increased the demand for rhinoplasties (nose jobs). 42% of surgeons surveyed have noticed that patients are seeking surgeries to improve their appearance in photographs, especially selfies taken at close distance. Another study found that selfies taken at a distance of 12 inches (30 cm) can exaggerate nasal size by as much as 30%, and recommends that people take pictures from a standard distance of 5 feet (1.5 meters) to minimize perspective distortion.

== Types ==
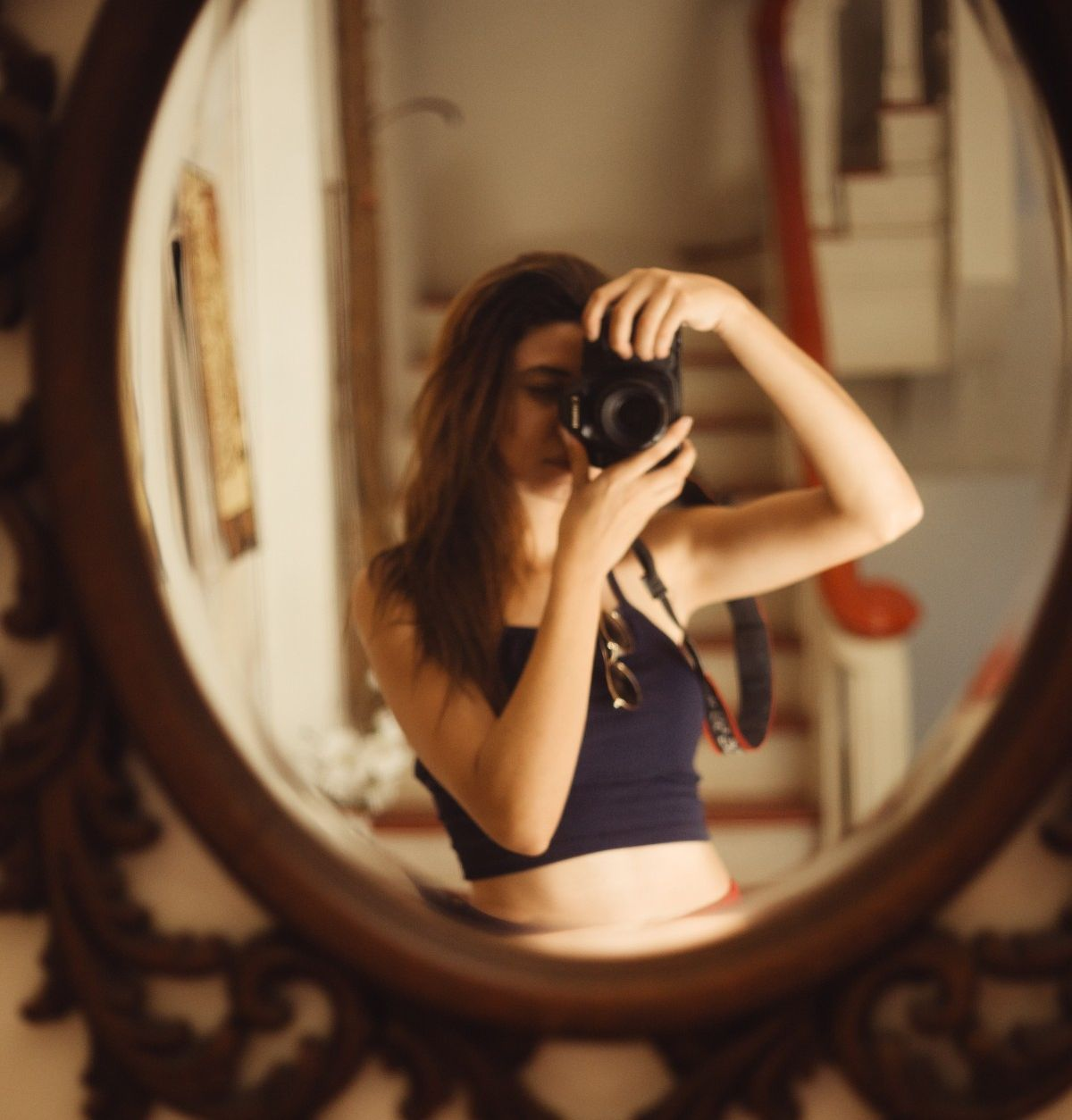
A self-portrait taken against a mirror

Since its popular usage, the term selfie has often been referred to describe self-portraits taken with the front camera of a mobile device. Because of this, the term "selfie camera" has also been used by some to describe the front-facing camera of mobile devices.

A self photo taken against a mirror is sometimes called a "mirror selfie", distinguishing it from an otherwise standard selfie.

Some phones released in 2019 included ultra wide angle lens in the back camera, which led to the popularization of the 0.5 or point five selfie. This style of selfie is distorted by the ultra wide angle, and it is inherently more unpredictable than a traditional selfie since users cannot view themselves while taking the photo. This style of selfie is popular among Gen Z for its unpredictable and whimsical style.

== Injuries while taking photos ==
The first known selfie-related death occurred 15 March 2014, when a man electrocuted himself on top of a train.

'The Year of the Selfie' was 2014. It was also the year Makati and Pasig, 'Selfie Capital of the World', saw their first selfie-related death when a 14-year-old girl fell from the 3rd floor staircase landing to the 2nd.

In 2015, it was reported that more people had been killed taking selfies that year than by shark attacks. Other publications have debated that analysis. Takers of selfie photographs have fallen to their deaths while losing their balance in a precarious position, and others have been wounded or killed while posing with handguns which have accidentally fired.

Concerned about the increasing number of incidents in Russia where attempts to set up a unique selfie had led to injuries and deaths, the Russian Ministry of the Interior released a "Selfie Safety Guide" in 2015 that warned selfie enthusiasts about some common dangerous behaviours. Moscow, Russia's most active selfie-taking city, is estimated to have 8 selfie-takers per 100,000 people, and ranks 301st among cities worldwide.

A 2015 study showed that 20% of young Britons had taken selfies while driving a car. Manchester has the highest amount of selfie-takers per capita in Great Britain with 114 per 100,000 people, and ranks 7th internationally. The Italian chief of state police expressed concern over the same phenomenon in Italy on the occasion of the launch of a short film with the title "Selfie". Milan is the 8th most active selfie-taking city in the world with 108 selfie-takers per 100,000 people.

According to Professor Amanda du Preez, there are least three types of selfie pictures documenting death, selfies unknowingly taken before death, where the taker's death is almost witnessed, or where the taker stands by while someone else dies.

In 2019, a teen left an imprint on the ground where he landed after falling more than four stories while attempting to take a selfie with his friends on a bridge in Dallas, Texas. He had multiple serious injuries, but he survived.

== See also ==
- 3D selfie
- Ballot selfie
- Imago camera
- List of selfie-related injuries and deaths
- Remote shutter
- Rooftopping
- Self-portrait
- Self timer
- Selfie studio
- Sleeveface
- Belfie
