= List of most-liked Instagram posts =

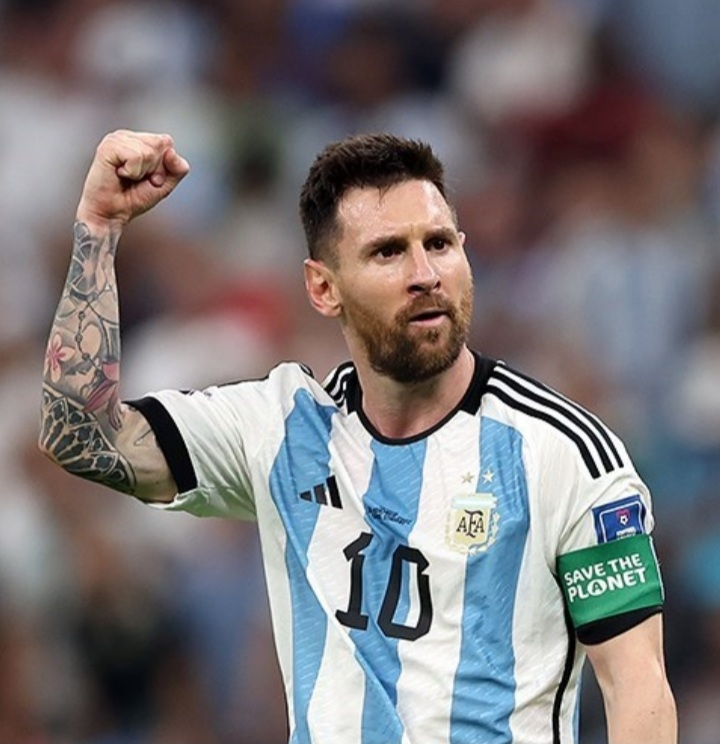
Lionel Messi, the current record-holder, at the 2022 FIFA World Cup.

This list of most-liked Instagram posts contains the top 20 posts by number of likes on the photo and video-sharing social networking service Instagram.

The most-liked post as of November 2026 is of the Argentine footballer Lionel Messi and his teammates celebrating the 2022 FIFA World Cup win at Lusail Stadium in Lusail, Qatar, which has been liked by over 74 million different accounts. Uploaded on December 18, 2022, the post shows Messi lifting his first World Cup Trophy after Argentina's win over France in the final. It is also the most liked post of all time across all social media platforms.

== History ==
On January 4, 2019, the account @world_record_egg posted a photo of an egg with the specific purpose of surpassing the then most-liked Instagram post, a picture of Kylie Jenner's daughter with 18.6 million likes. The photo of the egg was originally taken by Serghei Platanov, who then posted it to Shutterstock on June 23, 2015, with the title "eggs isolated on white background." The creator of the @world_record_egg account was Chris Godfrey, an advertising creative, and his friends CJ Brown and Alissa Khan-Whelan.

On January 14, 2019, the egg post became the most-liked post on Instagram, to which the egg's account owner wrote, "This is madness. What a time to be alive." Jenner responded with a video on Instagram of her cracking an egg open with the caption: "Take that little egg." Platanov was surprised by his photo's popularity, writing, "Egg is just an egg."

On December 18, 2022, footballer Lionel Messi posted a carousel with photos of him lifting the FIFA World Cup Trophy and celebrating with his teammates after winning the 2022 FIFA World Cup with Argentina, which reached 10 million likes within the first 39 minutes of its sharing. The following day, the post became the most-liked Instagram post in the first 24 hours of its sharing, with 50 million likes. On December 20, 2022, the post reached over 56 million likes, surpassing the previous record held by @world_record_egg.

Within 48 hours of Messi posting, the Instagram post had surpassed 64 million likes, and in doing so, it became the most-liked social media post ever across all social media platforms, by overtaking the most-liked post on YouTube, the music video for the song "Despacito", which had reached 50.2 million likes, and the most-liked post on TikTok, a video uploaded by Bella Poarch featuring her lip-syncing to the song "Sophie Aspin Send", which had reached 60.3 million likes. This also meant that it became the first ever post on Instagram to reach 60 and 70 million likes, achieving that in just 3 days since it was posted.

== Top 20 ==
Lionel Messi makes 5 while Cristiano Ronaldo makes 4 out of the top 20 most-liked posts.

Rank	Account name(s)	Owner	Post description	Post	Likes (millions)	Date posted (UTC)
1	@leomessi	Lionel Messi	Celebrating winning the 2022 FIFA World Cup		74.4	December 18, 2022
2	@world_record_egg	Chris Godfrey	An egg		60.2	January 4, 2019
3	@justinflom	Justin Flom	Reel of a Vegas Fun House		53.9	February 1, 2026
4	@leomessi	Lionel Messi	Lionel Messi in bed with the FIFA World Cup Trophy		53.2	December 20, 2022
5	@kishore_mondal_official	Kishore Mondal	Reel singing "Jeene Laga Hoon"		50.7	April 11, 2025
6	@isabellastricklandd	Isabella Strickland	Child roaming around wearing a POV camera		47.3	April 13, 2026
7	@Insta360	Insta360	Video of a tiny camera filming a toddler walking		46.6	May 11, 2025
8	@bredypett	Bredy e Guci	Reel of children with dogs		44.4	October 12, 2025
9	@epicflipzandkickz	EpicFlipzAndKickz	Reel of three children doing a bottle flip		43.8	November 24, 2025
10	@cristiano	Cristiano Ronaldo	Cristiano Ronaldo announcing his international retirement		41.8	November 5, 2026
11	@cristiano	Cristiano Ronaldo	Lionel Messi and Cristiano Ronaldo playing chess, advertising for Louis Vuitton		40.8	November 19, 2022
12	@leomessi	Lionel Messi	Lionel Messi on an airplane with the FIFA World Cup Trophy		40.7	December 19, 2022
13	@leomessi	Lionel Messi	Visit to Camp Nou		39.2	November 10, 2025
14	@taylorswift @killatrav	Taylor Swift; Travis Kelce	Engagement announcement		37.4	August 26, 2025
15	@emilio.piano	Emil Reinert	Reel of a little girl singing "Pretty Little Baby"		37.3	November 24, 2025
16	@emilio.piano	Emil Reinert	Reel of a little girl singing "My Heart Will Go On"		36.6	September 8, 2024
17	@cristiano	Cristiano Ronaldo	Cristiano Ronaldo taking an icy dip in snowy Lapland, Finland		34.8	December 24, 2024
18	@cristiano @georginagio	Cristiano Ronaldo; Georgina Rodríguez	Wedding of Cristiano Ronaldo to Georgina Rodríguez		34	August 11, 2026
19	@xxxtentacion	XXXTentacion	Final post before his death		33.9	May 19, 2018
20	@leomessi	Lionel Messi	Celebrating the 2022 FIFA World Cup win in Argentina		33.1	December 21, 2022

== Non-football-related top 20 ==
Most-liked Instagram posts posted by non-association footballers.

Also in the overall top 20

Rank	Account name	Owner	Post description	Post	Likes (millions)	Date posted (UTC)
1	@world_record_egg	Chris Godfrey	Photo of an egg		60.2	January 4, 2019
2	@justinflom	Justin Flom	Reel of a Vegas Fun House		53.9	February 1, 2026
3	@kishore_mondal_official	Kishore Mondal	Reel singing "Jeene Laga Hoon"		50.7	April 11, 2025
4	@isabellastricklandd	Isabella Strickland	Child roaming around wearing a POV camera		47.3	April 13, 2026
5	@Insta360	Insta360	Video of a tiny camera filming a toddler walking		46.6	April 22, 2025
6	@bredypett	Bredy e Guci	Reel of children with dogs		44.4	October 12, 2025
7	@epicflipzandkickz	EpicFlipzAndKickz	Reel of three children doing a bottle flip		43.8	November 24, 2025
8	@taylorswift @killatrav	Taylor Swift; Travis Kelce	Engagement announcement		37.4	August 26, 2025
9	@emilio.piano	Emil Reinert	Reel of a little girl singing "Pretty Little Baby"		37.3	November 24, 2025
10	@emilio.piano	Emil Reinert	Reel of a little girl singing "My Heart Will Go On"		36.6	September 8, 2024
11	@xxxtentacion	XXXTentacion	Final post before his death		33.9	May 19, 2018
12	@jiangzhibin24	liz_6	Reel of an AI-generated sunset		32.1	August 5, 2023
13	@xpogohenry	Henry Cabelus	Pogo stick stunt		31.1	July 6, 2024
14	@aurelien.froissart	Aurélien Froissart	Reel of a girl playing "Carol of the Bells" on the violin		31.1	December 23, 2023
15	@kavadi_druvam_kalasamithi_	Druvam Kalasamithi	Reel of a colorful wedding entrance		30.4	May 12, 2025
16	@aline_sarakbii @mostafa_srakbi	aline-sarakbii mostafa_srakbi	Reel of a baby		30.4	June 10, 2024
17	@pop_cj6	pop_cj6	Reel of humans taking off animal masks in front of animal mothers		29.5	February 27, 2024
18	@rashmika_mandanna	Rashmika Mandanna	Photos celebrating her wedding with Vijay Deverakonda		28.4	February 26, 2026
19	@sonyakisa8	Anastasia Averina	Funny reel of a cat		28.3	March 3, 2026
As of 20 November 2026

== Historical most-liked posts ==
The following table lists posts that were once the most-liked post on Instagram.

Current record
Longest record-holder

Account name	Owner	Post description	Post	Likes (millions)	Date posted (UTC)	Date achieved (UTC)	Days held
@leomessi	Lionel Messi	Celebrating winning the 2022 FIFA World Cup		74.8	December 18, 2022	December 20, 2022	1,432
@world_record_egg	Chris Godfrey	Photo of an egg		60.5	January 4, 2019	January 14, 2019	1,436
@kyliejenner	Kylie Jenner	First photo of her daughter		17.7	February 6, 2018	February 7, 2018	341
@beyonce	Beyoncé	Pregnancy announcement		10.6	February 1, 2017	February 1, 2017	371
@selenagomez	Selena Gomez	Coca-Cola advertisement		6.6	June 25, 2016	July 12, 2016	204
@lilbieber	Justin Bieber	Kiss with Selena Gomez		4.1	March 19, 2016	May 4, 2016	69
@kendalljenner	Kendall Jenner	Heart-shaped hairdo		3.5	May 25, 2015	June 26, 2015	313
@kimkardashian	Kim Kardashian	Wedding kiss with Kanye West		2.2	May 27, 2014	May 29, 2014	393
@lilbieber	Justin Bieber	Hug with Selena Gomez		2.2	January 4, 2014	2014	—
@lilbieber	Justin Bieber	Photo with Will Smith		1.4	August 15, 2013	2013	—
@lilbieber	Justin Bieber	Photo with his siblings		0.2	December 29, 2011	2012	—
As of 20 November 2026

== See also ==
In July 2026, a comment left by footballer Erling Haaland on an Instagram reel bypassed the platform's standard technical limit of 500 replies, accumulating over 46,000 replies, setting a record for the most-replied comment thread in the platform's history.

- List of most-viewed Instagram reels
- List of most-followed Instagram accounts
- List of most-followed Facebook pages
- List of most-liked tweets
- List of most-retweeted tweets
- List of most-liked YouTube videos
