= List of most-followed X accounts =

This list contains the top 50 accounts with the most followers on the social media platform X, formerly known as Twitter. As of November 2026, businessman Elon Musk, the owner of the website, has the most-followed account with over 241 million followers. He partially acquired these followers through changing the code of the platform to promote his own posts more favorably.

Other notable figures such as former U.S. President Barack Obama, professional footballer Cristiano Ronaldo, U.S. President Donald Trump, and Indian Prime Minister Narendra Modi each have over 100 million followers. In June 2017, singer Katy Perry became the first person to surpass the 100 million follower milestone, but has since fallen below that milestone.

== List ==
Businessman Elon Musk is the owner of X (formerly Twitter) and the most-followed person on X.

Former U.S. President Barack Obama is the second most-followed person on X.

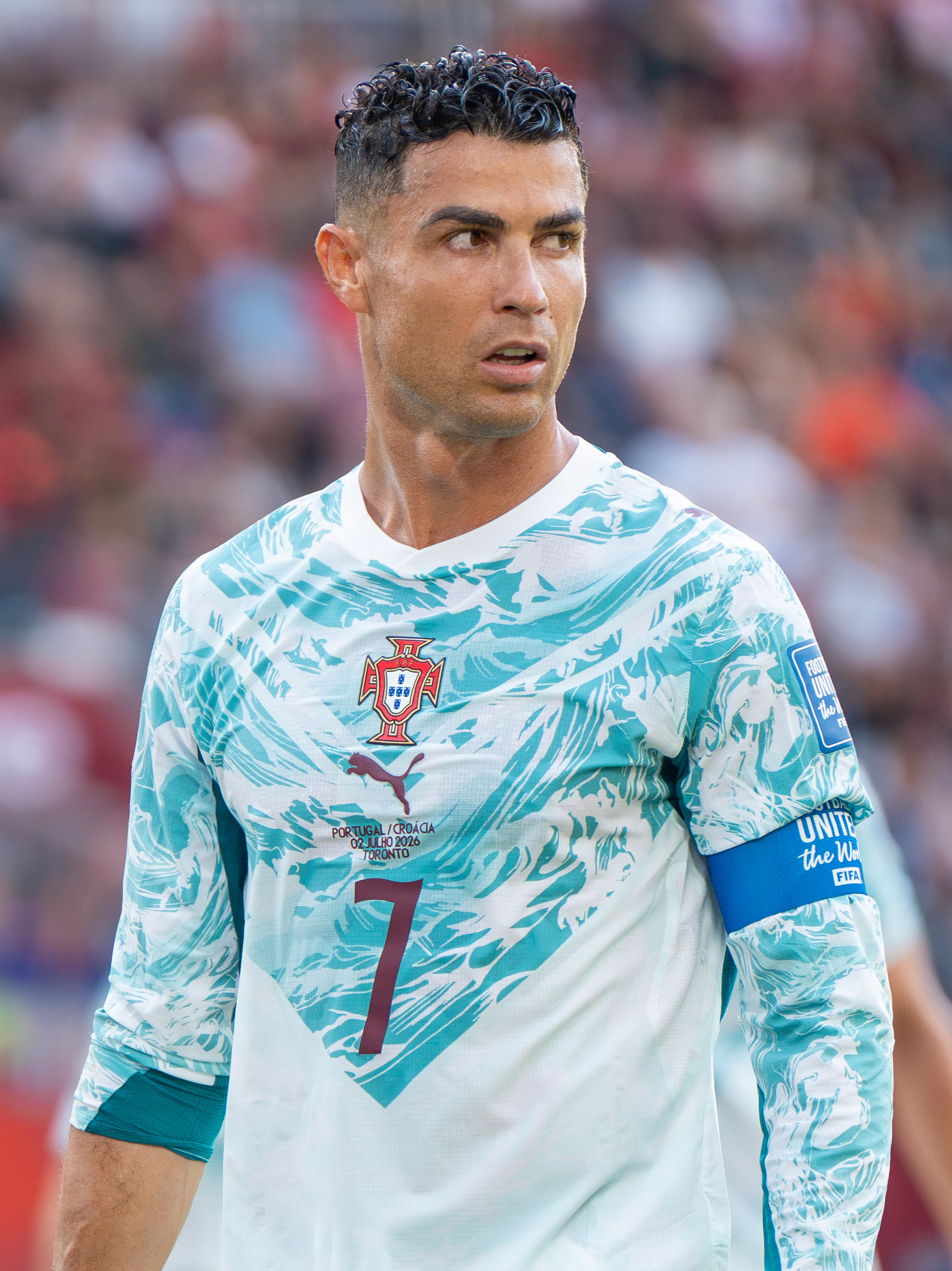
Portuguese footballer Cristiano Ronaldo is the third most-followed person on X.

U.S. President Donald Trump is the fourth most-followed person on X.

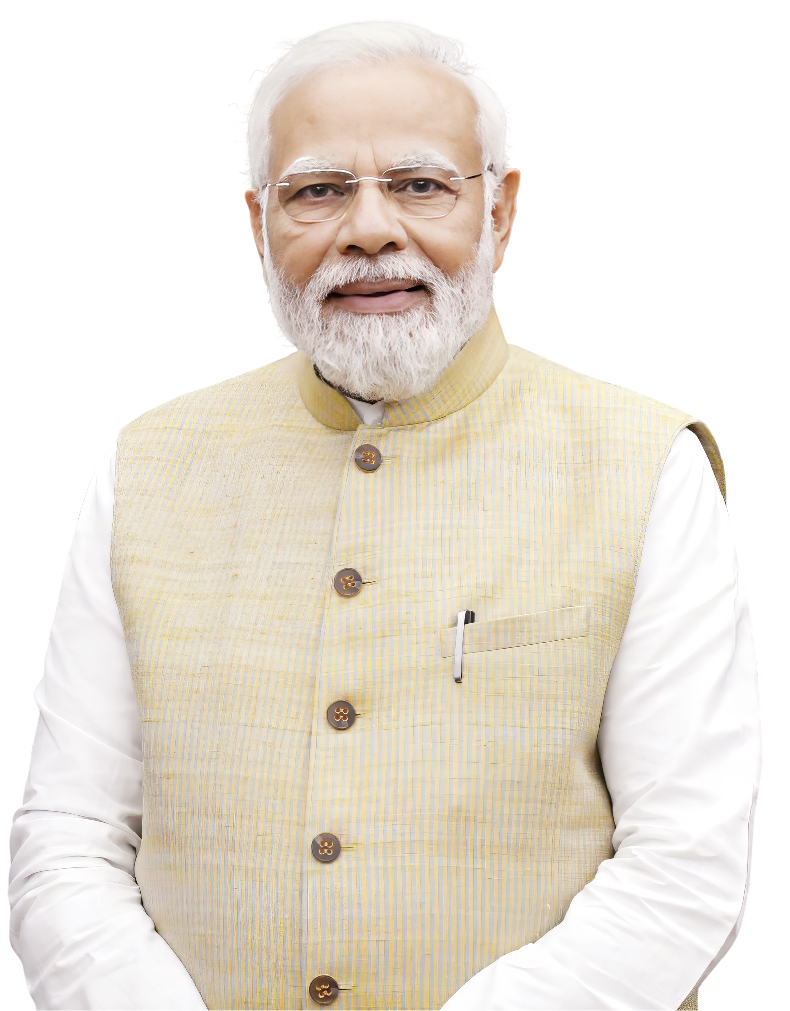
Indian Prime Minister Narendra Modi is the fifth most-followed person on X.

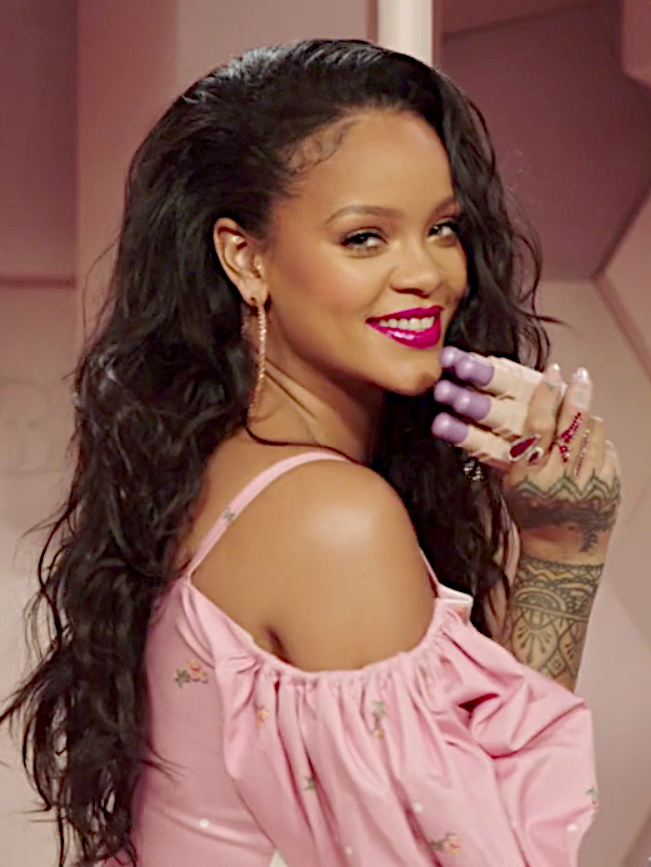
Barbadian singer Rihanna is the sixth most-followed person on X.

The following table lists the top 50 most-followed accounts on X, with each total rounded down to the nearest hundred thousand, as well as a profession of each account's holder. Some accounts post infrequently or are abandoned.

Username	Owner	Followers (millions)	Description	Brand account
@elonmusk	Elon Musk	241.4	Businessman, owner of X/Twitter	
@BarackObama	Barack Obama	118.7	President of the United States (2009–2017)	
@Cristiano	Cristiano Ronaldo	114.4	Football player	
@realDonaldTrump	Donald Trump	111.8	President of the United States (2017–2021, 2025–present)	
@narendramodi	Narendra Modi	107.0	Prime Minister of India (2014–present)	
@rihanna	Rihanna	98.7	Musician and businesswoman	
@NASA	NASA	92.2	Space agency	Yes
@justinbieber	Justin Bieber	91.7	Musician	
@katyperry	Katy Perry	90.0	Musician	
@taylorswift13	Taylor Swift	83.9	Musician	
@ladygaga	Lady Gaga	75.4	Musician and actress	
@imVkohli	Virat Kohli	73.4	Cricket player	
@KimKardashian	Kim Kardashian	70.8	Television personality and businesswoman	
@YouTube	YouTube	68.7	Online video sharing platform	Yes
@neymarjr	Neymar	66.4	Football player	
@BillGates	Bill Gates	65.2	Businessman and philanthropist	
@selenagomez	Selena Gomez	63.0	Musician and actress	
@TheEllenShow	Ellen DeGeneres	62.1	Comedian and former television host	
@CNN	CNN	61.7	News channel	Yes
@X	X (formerly Twitter)	60.6	Operator of platform	Yes
@cnnbrk	CNN Breaking News	60.0	News channel	Yes
@espn	ESPN	58.6	Sports channel	Yes
@PMOIndia	PMO India	58.3	Office of the Prime Minister of India	Yes
@KingJames	LeBron James	55.3	Basketball player	
@nytimes	The New York Times	53.8	Newspaper	Yes
@ChampionsLeague	UEFA Champions League	53.1	Football league	Yes
@BBCBreaking	BBC Breaking News	50.1	News channel	Yes
@realmadrid	Real Madrid CF	49.5	Football club	Yes
@jtimberlake	Justin Timberlake	47.6	Musician and actor	
@BTS_twt	BTS	47.5	Musicians	
@NBA	NBA	47.0	Basketball league	Yes
@FCBarcelona	FC Barcelona	46.8	Football club	Yes
@premierleague	Premier League	46.2	Football league	Yes
@ddlovato	Demi Lovato	46.0	Musician and actress	
@shakira	Shakira	45.4	Musician	
@bts_bighit	BTS	45.3	Musicians	
@SrBachchan	Amitabh Bachchan	44.7	Actor	
@PlayStation	PlayStation	44.4	Video gaming brand	Yes
@akshaykumar	Akshay Kumar	44.2	Actor	
@miley	Miley Cyrus	43.8	Musician and actress	
@britneyspears	Britney Spears	42.9	Musician	
@jimmyfallon	Jimmy Fallon	42.8	Comedian and television host	
@BBCWorld	BBC World News	42.3	News channel	Yes
@BeingSalmanKhan	Salman Khan	42.1	Actor	
@SportsCenter	SportsCenter	42.1	Sports channel	Yes
@SpaceX	SpaceX	41.9	Space agency	Yes
@iamsrk	Shah Rukh Khan	40.0	Actor	
@KylieJenner	Kylie Jenner	39.7	Social media personality and businesswoman	
@sachin_rt	Sachin Tendulkar	38.9	Former cricket player	
@ManUtd	Manchester United F.C.	38.2	Football club	Yes
Last updated on 1 November 2026 (8 days ago)

== Historical most-followed account ==
This is a historical list of the number-one most-followed account on X/Twitter. It includes the date of when the top spot was reached, the number of followers the account had at the time, and how long the top spot was held.

Username	Owner	Followers (millions)	Date achieved	Days held	Ref.
@elonmusk	Elon Musk	133.0	March 30, 2023	1,320	
@BarackObama	Barack Obama	107.8	August 15, 2019	1,323	
@katyperry	Katy Perry	46.5	November 4, 2013	2,110	
@justinbieber	Justin Bieber	33.3	January 21, 2013	287	
@ladygaga	Lady Gaga	5.7	August 23, 2010	882	
@britneyspears	Britney Spears	4.9	May 23, 2010	92	
@aplusk	Ashton Kutcher	1.0	April 16, 2009	402	
@cnnbrk	CNN Breaking News	0.9	April 8, 2009	8	

== See also ==
- List of most-liked tweets
- List of most-retweeted tweets
