= List of most-liked tweets =

List of 30 most-liked posts on X

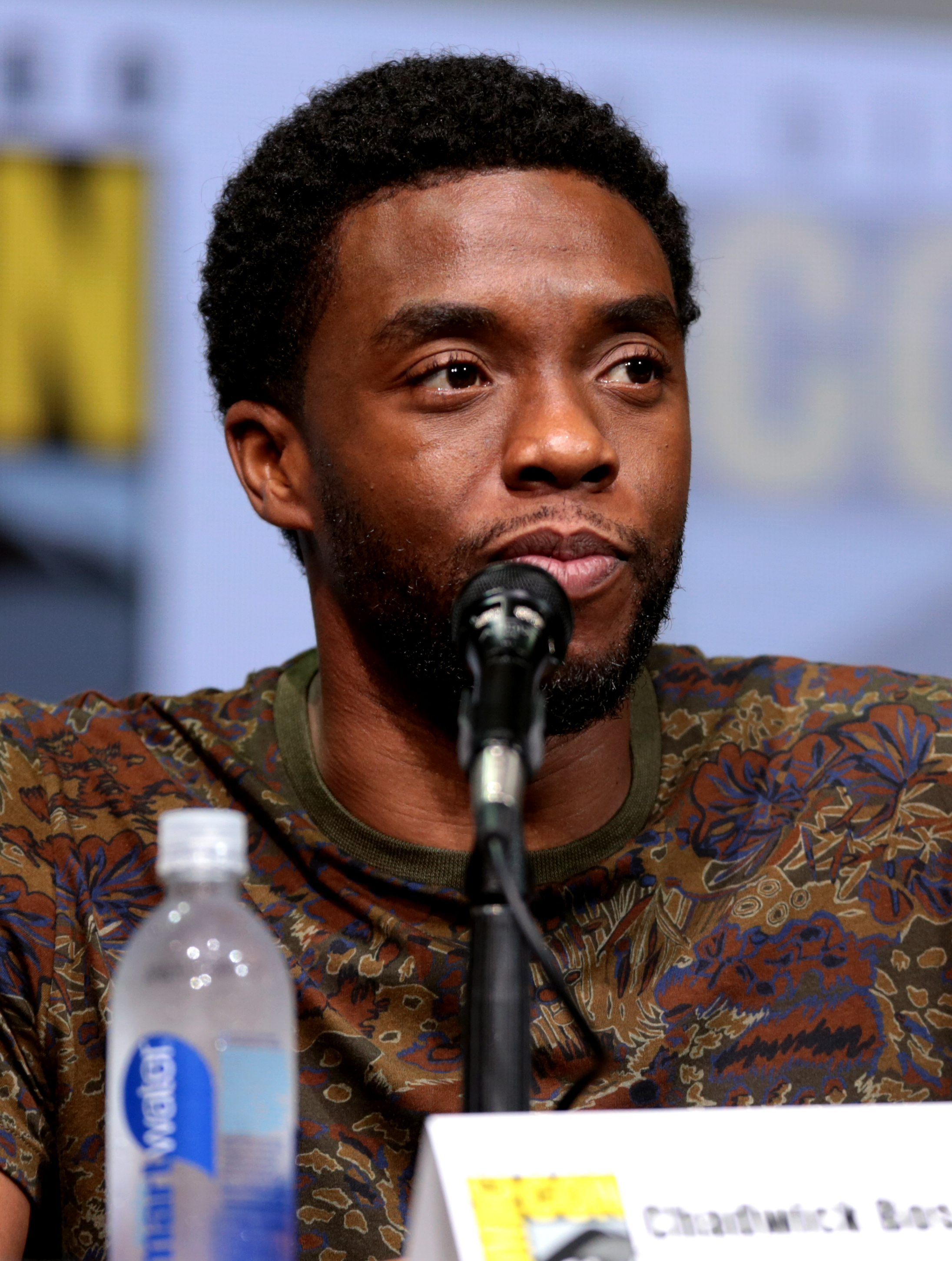
The most-liked tweet was posted by the account of the American actor Chadwick Boseman, announcing his death in 2020.

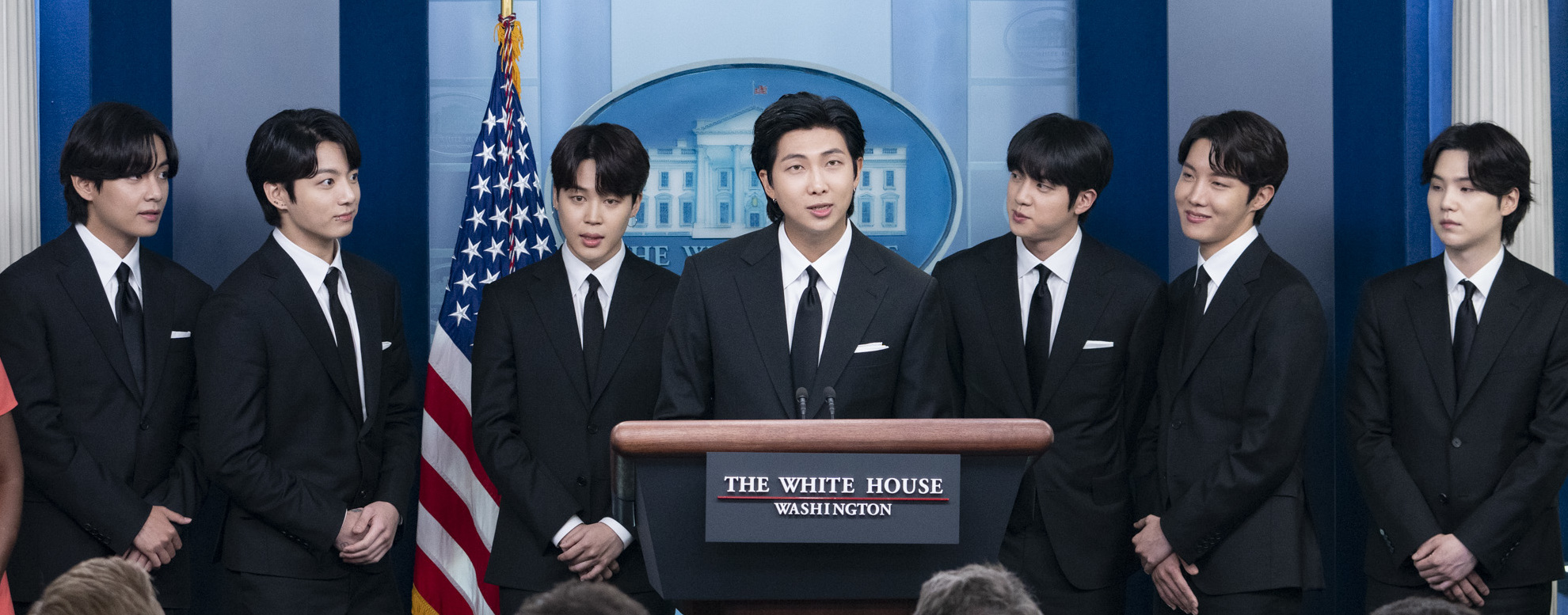
Members of South Korean band BTS have posted 15 of the 30 most-liked tweets.

This list contains the top 30 tweets with the most likes on the social networking platform X (formerly known as Twitter). X does not provide a full official list, but news and mainstream media often cover the topic. As of November 2026, the most-liked tweet has over 6 million likes and was posted by the account of American actor Chadwick Boseman, announcing his death from cancer. Five accounts have more than one of the most-liked tweets in the top 30: South Korean band BTS has 15, business magnate Elon Musk has 3, while former U.S. presidents Barack Obama and Joe Biden, and environmental activist Greta Thunberg each have two.

== Top 30 ==
The following table lists the top 30 most-liked tweets on Twitter/X, the account that posted it, the total number of likes rounded down to the nearest hundred thousand, and the date it was originally posted. Posts that have an identical number of likes are listed in date order with the most recent post ranked highest. The notes provide the details surrounding the post.

Deleted tweet

Rank	Tweet	Posted by	Likes (millions)	Date posted	Context
1	[It is with immeasurable grief that we confirm the passing of Chadwick Boseman. Chadwick was diagnosed with stage III colon cancer in 2016, and battled with it these last 4 years as it progressed to stage IV... ]	Family of Chadwick Boseman @chadwickboseman	6.6	August 28, 2020	Tweet announcing the death of American actor Chadwick Boseman. Boseman died after complications with colon cancer, which he had been diagnosed with four years prior; the diagnosis was only made public after his death. It became the most-liked tweet in the history of Twitter within 24 hours of its being posted, and was the most-retweeted tweet of 2020.
2	Next I'm buying Coca-Cola to put the cocaine back in	Elon Musk @elonmusk	4.3	April 27, 2022	Following his $44 billion acquisition of Twitter a few days prior to the date of this tweet, Elon Musk jokingly announced that he would also purchase Coca-Cola in order to restore the cocaine; the drink's original recipe contained coca leaf extract, from which the drug is derived.
3	"No one is born hating another person because of the color of his skin or his background or his religion..."	Barack Obama @BarackObama	3.6	August 12, 2017	This tweet was the first of three, by former U.S. president Barack Obama, quoting a passage from Nelson Mandela's autobiography, Long Walk to Freedom, in response to the 2017 Charlottesville attack. The accompanying picture, taken in 2011 by former White House photographer Pete Souza, shows Obama visiting a day care center in Bethesda, Maryland. Four days later, Twitter publicly confirmed that it had become the most-liked tweet on the platform ever, with over 3.3 million likes at the time of announcement. The tweet surpassed previous record holder Ariana Grande's Manchester tweet on August 15, 2017, when it reached 2.7 million likes three days after being posted.
4	yes, please do enlighten me. email me at smalldickenergy@getalife.com	Greta Thunberg @GretaThunberg	3.5	December 28, 2022	Swedish environmental activist Greta Thunberg tweeted this in response to British-American internet personality Andrew Tate, who posted a tweet taunting her with the emissions of his car collection.
5	It's a new day in America.	Joe Biden @JoeBiden	3.5	January 20, 2021	President-elect Joe Biden posted this tweet on the day of his inauguration as the 46th president of the United States. According to Twitter's year-end review, it was the most-liked tweet of 2021.
6	Congratulations to the Astronauts that left Earth today. Good choice	Andy Milonakis @andymilonakis	3.4	May 30, 2020	American comedian Andy Milonakis posted this tweet in response to the launch of Crew Dragon Demo-2 by SpaceX on May 30, 2020, during the ongoing COVID-19 pandemic and George Floyd protests. According to Twitter's year-end review, it was the third most-liked tweet of 2020.
7	Kobe was a legend on the court and just getting started in what would have been just as meaningful a second act. To lose Gianna is even more heartbreaking to us as parents. Michelle and I send love and prayers to Vanessa and the entire Bryant family on an unthinkable day.	Barack Obama @BarackObama	3.4	January 26, 2020	Barack Obama wrote this tweet in tribute to American basketball player Kobe Bryant after news of his and his daughter Gianna's deaths in a helicopter crash surfaced. According to Twitter's year-end review, it was the second most-liked tweet of 2020.
8	[A picture of Donald Trump raising his fist after surviving an assassination attempt]	Elon Musk @elonmusk	3.1	July 13, 2024	Photo by Evan Vucci of U.S. president Donald Trump putting his fist in the air after surviving an assassination attempt at a rally in Butler, Pennsylvania
9	this is what happens when you don't recycle your pizza boxes	Greta Thunberg @GretaThunberg	3.1	December 30, 2022	Following Andrew Tate's arrest in Romania, there was a debunked rumor that the authorities arrested Tate because a video he posted taunting Thunberg included a pizza box from a Romanian pizzeria, indicating he was in the country.
10	hello literally everyone	Twitter @Twitter	3.1	October 4, 2021	Twitter tweeted this on a day when Facebook, Inc.-owned social media platforms, such as Facebook, Instagram, and WhatsApp, suffered a major, worldwide outage. According to Twitter's year-end review, it was the third most-liked tweet of 2021. After Twitter rebranded into X in July 2023, the original Tweet author changed to the new, rebranded account.
11	😙	Jungkook @BTS_twt	3.0	January 24, 2021	BTS member Jungkook posted a selfie featuring his newly dyed blond hair. The tweet surpassed 1 million likes in 58 minutes. According to Twitter's year-end review, it was the second most-liked tweet of 2021.
12	Never Not 💜	Jungkook @BTS_twt	3.0	May 3, 2020	Video clip of BTS member Jungkook singing "Never Not" by American singer Lauv. The tweet accumulated 1 million likes within two hours; it was additionally the fastest in 2020 to reach 1 million views.
13	I hope that even my worst critics remain on Twitter, because that is what free speech means	Elon Musk @elonmusk	2.9	April 25, 2022	Elon Musk posted this tweet ahead of Twitter board unanimously accepting his buyout deal. The acquisition was completed in October 2022, and in December 2022, accounts belonging to several journalists were banned.
14	💘 @Harry_Styles 💝	J-Hope @BTS_twt	2.9	November 20, 2021	Shows video of BTS members singing along to a song during a Harry Styles concert held in Los Angeles on the same day as the tweet.
15	아미 보고 싶다 ㅜ	Jungkook @BTS_twt	2.9	April 11, 2021	BTS member Jungkook posted a selfie of him wearing a purple (the color is symbolic of the band's fandom) sweatshirt and a black beanie, with the caption "ARMY I miss you" in reference to the band's fans.
16	Hi Army😊	V @BTS_twt	2.9	August 16, 2020	BTS member V posted a pair of selfies from behind-the-scenes of a photoshoot. In December 2020, Twitter revealed that his tweet was both the most-liked K-pop related tweet and the most-liked BTS tweet of the year with 3.2 million likes.
17	Love U💜	J-Hope @BTS_twt	2.8	November 24, 2021	
18	focus on army💜	Jungkook @BTS_twt	2.8	November 22, 2021	Jungkook posted this after the American Music Awards.
19	연습 연습 연습!!! #JK	Jungkook @BTS_twt	2.8	May 29, 2021	
20	셀프 염색 :) #JJK	Jungkook @BTS_twt	2.8	February 24, 2021	BTS member Jungkook posted a selfie with self-dyed blue hair.
21	정국이 생일축하해요이?	V @BTS_twt	2.8	September 1, 2020	BTS member V tweeted this video of him wishing bandmate Jungkook a happy birthday in Korean in celebration of the latter's 23rd birthday that day.
22	Hey guys, wanna feel old? I'm 40. You're welcome.	Macaulay Culkin @IncredibleCulk	2.8	August 26, 2020	American actor Macaulay Culkin, best known for his role as young Kevin McCallister in the Home Alone and Home Alone 2 movies, posted this tweet a day after his 40th birthday. Intended as a joke to "make people feel old", the tweet elicited thousands of shocked responses from fans, many of whom still thought of Culkin as the film character. According to Twitter's year-end review, it was the fourth most-liked tweet of 2020.
23	👍	V @BTS_twt	2.7	September 20, 2021	
24	다녀오겠습니다😊 #JIMIN #꾸기	Jimin @BTS_twt	2.7	September 18, 2021	
25	💜💜	V @BTS_twt	2.7	June 25, 2021	
26	💜 x7	BTS @BTS_twt	2.7	June 1, 2021	BTS posted two group selfies of the band celebrating the debut of its single "Butter" at number one on the Billboard Hot 100—it was the band's third number-one debut and fourth number-one song on the chart overall.
27	Well well well 😂	Erling Haaland @Erling	2.6	July 5, 2026	Footballer Erling Haaland posted a selfie of himself sitting in the Norway national football team’s locker room after scoring both goals in their 2026 FIFA World Cup round of 16 match against Brazil to send Norway to their first quarterfinal in history. This is the most liked tweet ever made by an athlete.
28	We did it, @JoeBiden.	Kamala Harris @KamalaHarris	2.6	November 7, 2020	Vice president-elect Kamala Harris tweeted a video of herself congratulating president-elect Joe Biden over the phone after the pair won the 2020 United States presidential election. According to Twitter's year-end review, it was the fifth most-liked tweet of 2020.
29	America, I'm honored that you have chosen me to lead our great country. The work ahead of us will be hard, but I promise you this: I will be a President for all Americans — whether you voted for me or not. I will keep the faith that you have placed in me.	Joe Biden @JoeBiden	2.5	November 7, 2020	Joe Biden's first tweet after defeating sitting president Donald Trump in the 2020 United States presidential election. It accumulated over 1 million likes in less than 30 minutes of being posted.
30	We met @lizzo 😍🤙	J-Hope, Jimin, Jungkook & V @BTS_twt	2.5	November 20, 2021	Members of BTS attended a Harry Styles concert in Los Angeles, during which they met Lizzo. BTS members and Lizzo were photographed together in three photos posted below the tweet.
As of July 8, 2026

== See also ==
- List of most-disliked YouTube videos
- List of most-followed X accounts
- List of most-liked Instagram posts
- List of most-liked YouTube videos
- List of most-retweeted tweets
- List of most-subscribed YouTube channels
