= Mizutamari Bond =

Japanese YouTuber

Mizutamari Bond 水溜りボンド
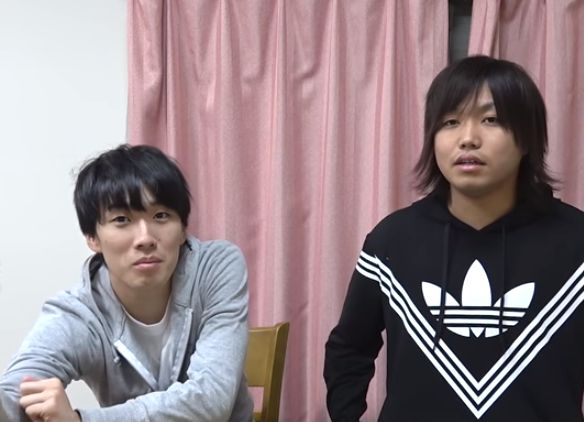
- Kanta (left) and Tommy (right)
- Born: Satō Michael Kanta; April 4, 1994 (age 32); Tominaga Tomoyoshi; July 26, 1993 (age 33)
- Occupation: YouTuber

YouTube information
- Channels: Mizutamari Bond; Kanta no Daibōken【Ningen】; Tomi Video
- Years active: 2014-present
- Genre: Comedy
- Subscribers: 4.17 million
- Views: 4.82 billion
- Last updated: 4 September 2024
- Website: mizutamari-bond.com

Mizutamari Bond (Japanese: 水溜りボンド, Mizutamari Bondo) is a Japanese YouTuber duo, consisting of Kanta (カンタ) and Tommy (トミー, Tomī). The duo began posting videos in 2015 and belong to multi-channel network UUUM. As of February 2022, Mizutamari Bond was the 22nd most-viewed YouTube channel in Japan with 3.6 billion views, and the 26th most-subscribed channel in Japan with 4.04 million subscribers.

== Overview ==
Mizutamari Bond's videos consist mostly of experiments, urban legends and pranks. In the past, they did not use a very high budget even for their most expensive experiments, and the average budget for one video was about 500 yen (about US$4.40). The duo are known to be conscious of making videos that avoid off-color humor, which has had great influence on the acquisition of viewers as their video content can be safely watched by both families and the young generation. From this principle, fans often call Mizutamai Bond "the NHK of YouTube".

The duo has had many collaborations with various entertainers and YouTubers, and have invited guests on their videos including Generations from Exile Tribe members, HIKAKIN, Hajime Syacho, Fischer's, Tokai On Air, Yuka Kinoshita, Mahoto Watanabe.

Their videos always start with a fixed greeting, "Hai, dōmo, Mizutamari Bondo desu. Onegaishimasu. Tomī desu. Kanta desu. Onegaishimasu.", roughly meaning "Hello, this is Mizutamari Bond. Best regards. I am Tommy. I am Kanta. Best regards."

== History ==
Satō Michael Kanta and Tominaga Tomoyoshi (later known as Kanta and Tommy, respectively) met at Aoyama Gakuin University's owarai club and formed a manzai duo. In 2014, the two advanced to the second round of King Of Conte 2014.

The two opened a YouTube channel called "Mizutamari Bond" on YouTube on October 6, 2014. They posted their first video in January 2015, which only reached 100 views, but as they continued to post a video at 8:00 pm every day; by June 2016, the number of subscribers had reached 650,000.

In 2016, Mizutamari Bond made their first appearance on television when the duo appeared as commentators for the special program Omae, Terebi Deterutteyo!! on TV Kanagawa on December 31, 2016, and January 1, 2017.

On August 13, 2020, Mizutamari Bond announced that they would quit posting videos 7 days a week, which they uploaded every day since January 1, 2015, until the end of 2020.

On June 18, 2021, 31 people, including Tommy, attended a party despite a COVID-19 state of emergency in Japan. Regarding this, an apology video by both Tommy and Kanta was posted, with Tommy announcing his hiatus. In addition, the bar where the party was held was owned by Tommy, which suspended its business immediately after the news and was closed down in July of the same year. The channel was updated on July 17, and a new apology video by Kanta alone was posted. In the video, Tommy's return was left completely undecided, but Kanta denied the group's dissolution, saying, "I really don't want Mizutamari Bond to end in this way." Since then, Kanta has continued to post videos without Tommy.

== Appearances ==
=== Variety shows ===
- Omae, Terebi Deterutteyo!! (2016–2017) TV Kanagawa
- Mizutamari Bondo ga Nanika Surutteyo (2020) TV Kanagawa
- Mizutamari Bondo no ○○ Ikutteyo (2020–2021) TV Kanagawa, Nittele Muryō TADA! (Nippon TV), TVer

=== Television dramas ===
- Yonimo Kimyōna Monogatari Aki no Tokubetsuhen (2018) Fuji TV, Kanta as Shibuya Kōmyō, Tommy as Yakisobaya
- Love will begin when Money ends (2020) TBS TV, Tommy as the commentator
- Sensei wo Kesu Houteishiki (2020) TV Asahi, Kanta as police officer, Tommy as detective

=== Movies ===
- Stalking Vampire (2018) YouTube Originals
- Sadako (2019) Kadokawa, Kanta and Tommy as themselves

=== Anime ===
- Aware! Meisaku-kun (2017) NHK Educational TV, Kanta and Tommy as themselves

=== Web shows ===
- Mizutamari Bondo no Seishun Dōgasō (2021) AbemaTV

=== Radio shows ===
- Mizutamari Bondo no All Night Nippon 0(Zero) (2019–2020) Nippon Broadcasting System
