= Tokai On Air =

Japanese YouTuber group

- 東海オンエア
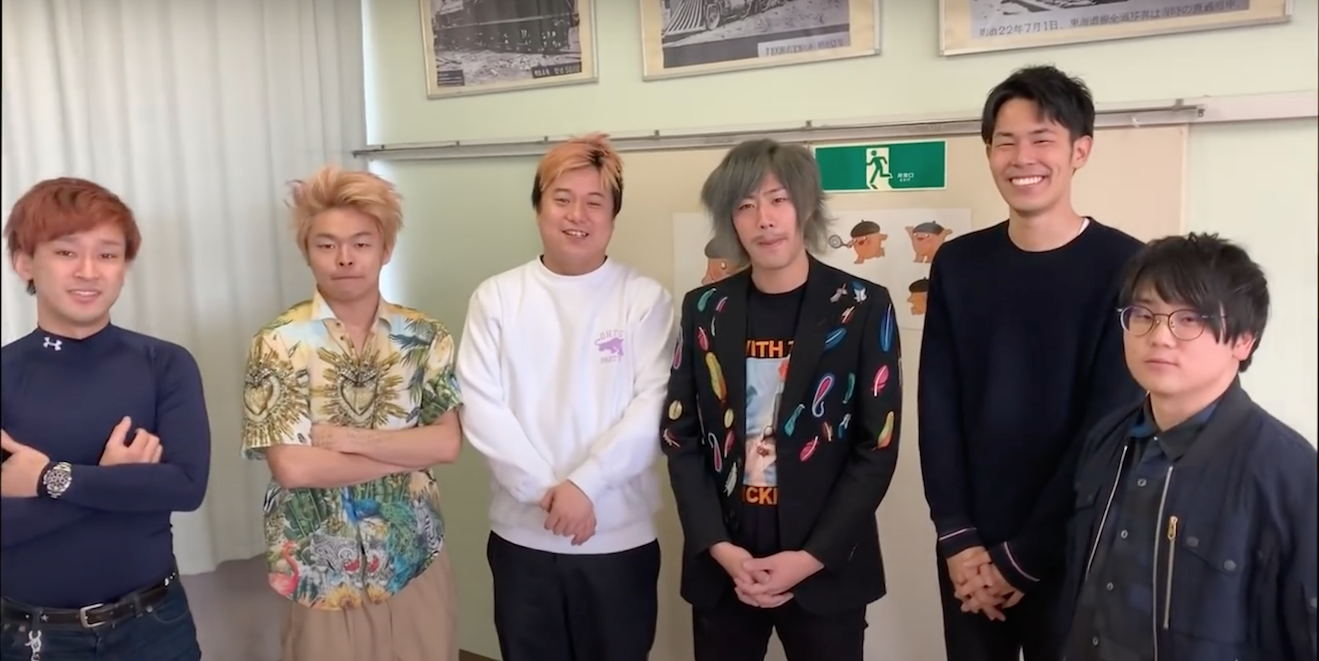
- From the left: Toshimitsu, Shibayu, Yumemaru, Tetsuya, Ryo, Mushimegane
- Occupation: YouTuber

YouTube information
- Channels: Tokai On Air; Tokai On Air Hikaeshitsu
- Years active: 2013-present
- Genre: Comedy
- Subscribers: 7.24 million (Tokai On Air); 3.13 million (Tokai On Air Hikaeshitsu)
- Views: 16.1 billion (Tokai On Air); 3.11 billion (Tokai On Air Hikaeshitsu)
- Last updated: 18 March 2026

Tokai On Air (Japanese: 東海オンエア) is a Japanese YouTuber group based in Okazaki, Aichi Prefecture consisting of 6 members: Tetsuya, Ryo, Shibayu, Toshimitsu, Yumemaru, and Mushimegane. The group began posting videos on YouTube in 2013, and belong to multi-channel network UUUM since 2017.

As of February 2023, the main channel Tokai On Air was the 5th most-viewed channel in Japan with 11.92 billions views, and the 14th most-subscribed channel in Japan with 6.82 million subscribers. The group additionally has a secondary channel "Tokai On Air Hikaeshitsu" (Tokai On Air Waiting Room), and each member has their own personal channel.

== Overview ==
The group was named "Tokai On Air" as all members hail from Aichi Prefecture in Japan's Tōkai region. Since 2016, the members have been annually appointed as tourism missionaries of Okazaki City, Aichi Prefecture. Video themes involve mostly experiments and competitions between the members, and the group's main concept is "doing what children want to do but cannot do."

The group often has severe penalty games for the loser of a game or a quiz, that are in effect even during the member's private life, such as Tetsuya not being able to eat cream puffs during the entire Reiwa era. Although many viewers appreciate the members for devoting themselves wholeheartedly, sometimes even risking their own health, for the content, others have criticized them for "strangling themselves" and being too hardcore.

Tokai On Air are open about their private life, and their leader Tetsuya in particular does not hesitate to speak about his love life or fetishes and does not enjoy lying or pretending, even if it is a comment on food showcased on a TV show. Z-sedai Hakusho, a white paper by TikTok, states that generation Z dislikes promotional and duplicitous content, which may be considered one reason for Tokai On Air's popularity. On the other hand, many fellow YouTubers have said that Tetsuya "does not think", and viewers have criticized him for being "disrespectful" and "slovenly", sometimes resulting in Tokai On Air coming under fire from the public.

== History ==
On October 12, 2013, Tokai On Air's YouTube channel was created and began by posting comedy and hidden camera videos.

In August 2016, the group made a guest appearance at the Okazaki Castle Ieyasu Summer Festival, and were appointed as "Okazaki Tourism Missionaries" by Okazaki City. Ever since, they have been appointed the role annually.

On November 18, 2017, the group announced that they would join the multi-channel network UUUM at UUUM's U-FES. 2017 event.

In June 2019, Tokai On Air became an ambassador for "Team Coca-Cola Tokyo 2020 Olympics" for the 2020 Summer Olympics by Coca-Cola Japan. They appeared at events with HIKAKIN, Hajime Syacho, Fischer's, AVNTIS, and Mizutamari Bond.

In 2020, BitStar's Influencer Power Ranking ranked Tokai On Air number one for the first half of 2020 as well as summer 2020 in terms of total YouTube channel views (in Japan).

During the Tokyo 2020 Olympic torch relay in 2021, Tokai On Air carried the Olympic flame through their hometown Okazaki City.

== Members ==
Name	Date of birth	Place of birth	Role
Tetsuya	October 30, 1993	Okazaki, Aichi Prefecture	Leader
Shibayu	December 30, 1993	Okazaki, Aichi Prefecture	YouTube Story
Ryo	June 11, 1993	Okazaki, Aichi Prefecture	Shooting preparation
Toshimitsu	July 17, 1993	Okazaki, Aichi Prefecture	Events
Yumemaru	January 23, 1994	Anjō, Aichi Prefecture	Membership
Mushimegane	September 29, 1992	Okazaki, Aichi Prefecture	Accounting Secondary channel

=== Episodes ===
On October 1, 2016, member Shibayu married Ayanan, a fellow YouTuber. The two are active on the couple's own YouTube channel, Shibanan Channel.

On February 14, 2017, Tetsuya became a victim of stalking by a woman who had seen a Tokai On Air video. The woman was arrested again in December of the same year for stalking YouTuber Hajime Syacho.

In January 2021, Tetsuya received widespread criticism for defending YouTuber Mahoto Watanabe on Twitter concerning allegations that Watanabe had solicited obscene photos from an underage girl and blackmailed her with them. Although at the time of Tetsuya's tweet the allegations were not confirmed and the tweet was received as defense against slander, following Watanabe's UUUM contract termination and arrest, Tetsuya was widely recognized as a defender of Watanabe and his actions.

On August 16, 2022, Tetsuya married former AKB48 member Minami Minegishi.

== Music ==
In 2019, three of Tokai On Air's members, Tetsuya, Shibayu and Toshimitsu, formed a musical group called "Recitals".

=== Singles ===
Release date	Artist name	Title	Type	Label	Notes
July 20, 2018	Tokai On Air Tetsuya	Coming Out of THE WORLD.	Digital release		
November 22, 2019	Recitals	Orera Recitals	Digital release	UUUM Music	
March 20, 2021	Recitals	Dejavina (Japanese ver.)	Digital release	UUUM Music	Ending theme of Datsuryoku News Network on FNS

== Appearances ==
=== Television ===
- Nippon Zenkoku gojiman rettō Jimangu (Fuji TV, November 11, 2014) Tetsuya, Toshimitsu
- Honnō Z (CBC TV, October 4, 2017)
- Numa ni hamatte kīte mita (NHK Educational, October 15, 2018) Tetsuya, Toshimitsu, Shibayu
- DOWN TOWN DX (NNS, February 27, 2020) Tetsuya, Shibayu, Ryo
- Matsuko Kaigi (NNS, October 3, 2020) Tetsuya, Shibayu
- Tokai On Air 〜 Jōkyō Fesu 2020 〜 (Nippon TV, December 28–30, 2020)
- Jinsei no Game jikkyō! Tokai Sai On Air (Chukyo TV, March 13, 2021)

=== Streaming television ===
- Monsuto 1000-manko ōbu yamawake! Tsuchida Hikakin gundan VS Dachō Kurabu! (AbemaTV, January 27, 2018) Tetsuya, Toshimitsu, Mushimegane
- Kabushikigaisha Grey Zone Agency (YouTube Originals, 10 episodes, March 23, 2020)

=== Radio ===
- Zaimyō minpō rajio 5-kyoku kyōdō kikaku Yume Tube ~ anata no yume o rajio ga tsunagu ~ (CBC Radio, Tokai Radio, FM Aichi, ZIP-FM, Radio NEO, September 10, 2017)
- Tokai On Air Natsu no tokubetsu jugyō (TBS Radio, September 2, 2018)
- Tokai On Air Radio (Tokai Radio, October 4, 2018 – present)

=== Tours ===
- Headlining
  - Gachinko Kuji-Kuji Biki-Biki Tsua-Tsua Don-Don! Tour (2019 – 2020)
- Supporting
  - U-FES. Tour 2017 (2017)
  - U-FES. Tour 2018 (2018)
  - U-FES. Tour 2019 (2019)
