= YouTube Theme Song 2 =

Japanese single by Hikakin & Seikin

Single by Hikakin & Seikin
- Language: Japanese
- Released: August 14, 2025
- Genre: J-POP; Dubstep
- Label: Uuum Records
- Songwriter: Seikin
- Producer: TeddyLoid

Hikakin & Seikin singles chronology
"Call" (2024)	"YouTube Theme Song 2" (2025)

"YouTube Theme Song 2" (Japanese: ユーチューブテーマソング ツー, Hepburn: Yūchūbu Tēma Songu Tsū) is a song by Japanese musical duo Hikakin & Seikin. It was released by Uuum Records on August 14, 2025, as their eighth digital-only single. This song is a remake of the 2015 single "YouTube Theme Song."

== Background ==
Prior to the release of this song, Hikakin had been counting down from mid-July of the same year on his YouTube channel and on X's header image until August 14, the day before the music video was released. On August 13, the day before, Hikakin posted a video titled "Regarding the fuss I've been causing [Countdown]" in which he said the following:

In fact, we here at HikakinTV have been counting down for 30 days now. The channel header, community posts, and even the channel icon have all had numbers decreasing from 30. Tomorrow it will finally reach 0. At 7pm on Thursday, August 14th, 2025, when the number reaches 0, we will be releasing a certain video here on HikakinTV. We started the countdown 30 days ago with the hope that this will reach as many people as possible.

The music video was released on the YouTube channel "HikakinTV" at 7pm on August 14. It is the first release in 10 years since the previous song, "YouTube Theme Song." In the comments section, Hikakin said the following about the song:

We were able to reach the continuation of that song together. The 10 years I've spent with my brother and all my fans are packed into this song. I want to continue moving forward with everyone who has walked this path with me. Thank you from the bottom of my heart.

Additionally, Seikin said:

With 10 years of feelings and the DNA of the original song in my heart, I packed it with dreams, hopes, and courage. The support of all the fans who have walked with me and supported me has always been my driving force. Thank you so much. I hope this song will always be a song that illuminates the future.

== Charts ==
Chart	Peak position
Japan Download Songs (Billboard Japan)	49
