= Hikakin & Seikin =

Japanese musical duo

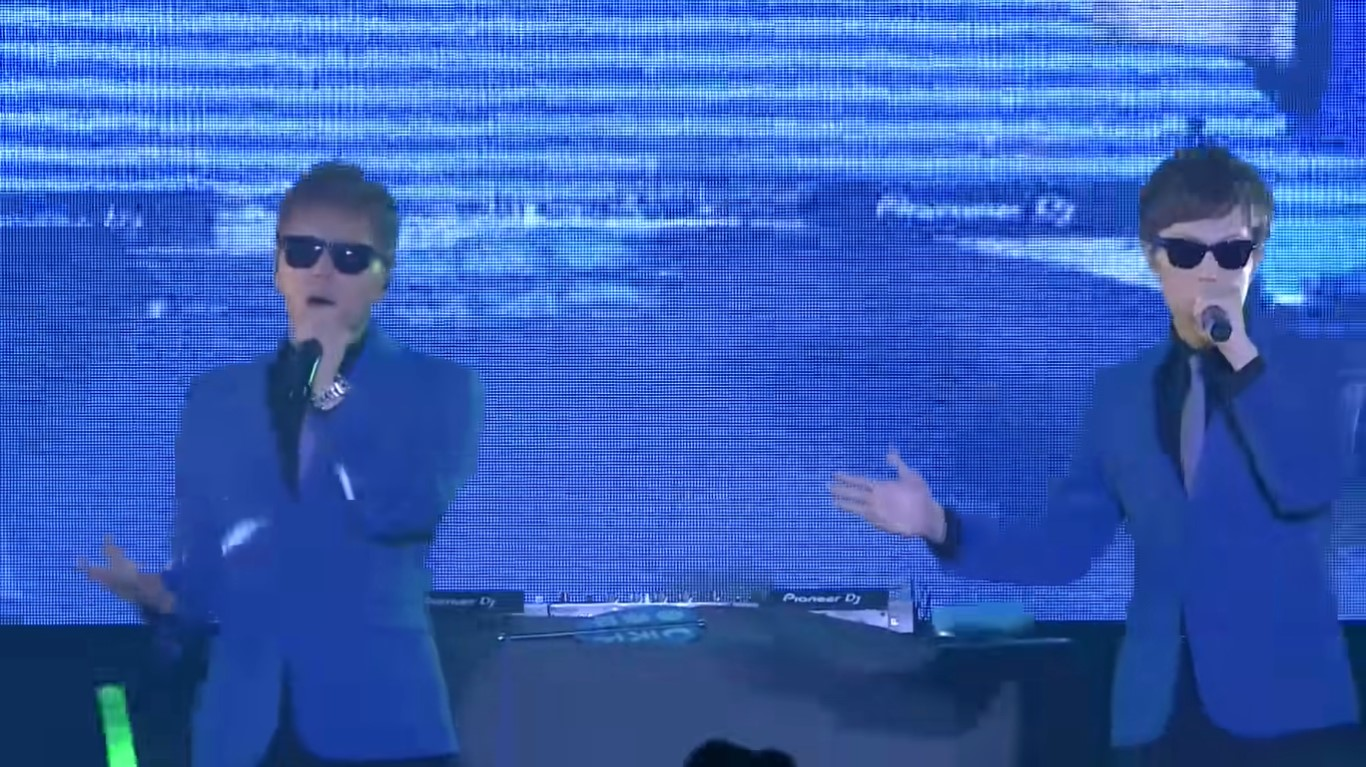
- Hikakin & Seikin performing in 2018

Background information
- Origin: Japan
- Genre: J-pop
- Years active: 2015–present
- Label: Uuum
- Members: Hikakin; Seikin
- Website: uuum.jp

Hikakin & Seikin (stylized in all caps as HIKAKIN & SEIKIN) is a Japanese duo formed in 2015. The members are Hikakin and Seikin, who are known as YouTubers. Collaborator Japanese music producer TeddyLoid is mainly in charge of arranging the songs. Debuted with the self-produced single "YouTube Theme Song". The CD was released by Uuum Records on November 21, 2015.

== History ==
On August 14, 2015, Hikakin and Seikin, who were originally known as YouTubers, announced that they would make their debut as singers, and on the same day they independently released their first single, "YouTube Theme Song." A CD+DVD edition was released by Uuum Records on November 21 of the same year.

On October 19, 2017, the 2nd single "Zasso" was released. A CD version was released by Uuum Records on July 22, 2018. The song reached number 19 on the Billboard Japan Hot 100.

The 3rd single "Ima" was released on November 18, 2018, and became a hot topic for its long, one-shot recording played in reverse. It has also been viewed over 30 million times.

On December 19, 2019, the 4th single "Yume" was released. The music video was released on December 15. In addition, prior to the release of the Music Video, the song was performed at YouTube's major event "YouTube FanFest 2019 YTFF" (Creator Live Show) held at Makuhari Messe Event Hall on December 4. A live broadcast on YouTube was also held.

In 2021, the 6th single "FIRE" will be released in conjunction with HikakinTV's 10th anniversary.

On October 28, 2022, American a cappella group Pentatonix released the single "Last Christmas" featuring Hikakin & Seikin. The song is a cover of Wham!'s "Last Christmas", and the collaboration was realized when Pentatonix offered the song to Hikakin & Seikin. The music video was released on December 14 of the same year.

On August 14, 2025, they released their seventh single, "YouTube Theme Song 2." This song is a remake of the "YouTube Theme Song," released 10 years after the original.

== Discography ==
=== Singles ===
Title	Year	Peak chart positions	Album
Title	Year	JPN Hot	Album
"YouTube Theme Song"	2015	78	YouTube Theme Song EP
"Zasso"	2017	19	Non-album single
"Ima"	2018	43	Non-album single
"Yume"	2019	—	Non-album single
"Hikari"	2020	—	Non-album single
"FIRE"	2021	—	Non-album single
"Call"	2024	—	Non-album single
"YouTube Theme Song 2"	2025	—	Non-album single
