= Bear Witness, Take Action 2: Continuing the Movement =

2020 television special on racial inequality

- Produced by: Phillip Byron; Maverick Carter; Jamal Henderson; LeBron James; Jamila Jordan
- Starring: Keke Palmer; Common
- Edited by: Aurora De Lucia; Jason Decker; James Fletcher; Tom Muschamp
- Production companies: Fly on the Wall Entertainment; SpringHill Entertainment
- Distributed by: YouTube Premium
- Release date: December 5, 2020
- Country: United States
- Language: English

Bear Witness, Take Action 2: Continuing the movement is an American YouTube Original television special which aired on December 5, 2020, as part of a YouTube Original Channel Initiative supporting the Black Lives Matter movement in correspondence with the George Floyd protests.

It gathers notable people of color in the United States such as Anthony Anderson, Soledad O'Brien, Isabel Wilkerson, Karamo Brown, and more and is hosted by Keke Palmer and Common.

It centers around the history and experiences as people of color in America, as well as exploring ways to raise awareness and end the long inequality and it weaves in intersectionality, having some segments focused on LGBTQ+ issues and the intersection of how those issus relate with race.

It is a continuation of Bear Witness, Take Action which aired in June of 2020.

== Background, production, and release ==
On May 25, 2020, George Floyd, an African-American man, was murdered by officer Derek Chauvin in Minneapolis, Minnesota, during an arrest for allegedly using a counterfeit bill. Chauvin knelt on Floyd's neck for over nine minutes, as Floyd begged for his life and repeatedly said "I can't breathe."

As a result, an ongoing series of protests and civil unrest began, starting in Minneapolis, as part of the Black Lives Matter movement. "I can't breathe" became a human rights slogan, heard chanted in nearly all protests created nationally and globally.

Representing YouTube, CEO Susan Wojcicki says that YouTube will be doing a US$100 million "project" to "amplify and develop the voices of [b]lack creators and artists and their stories," which will be a YouTube Original program "bring[ing] together creators, artists, influential public figures and prominent activist voices for roundtable discussions and musical performances." Viewers can also choose to donate to the Equal Justice Initiative (EJI) via an icon set to the livestream. In the livestream's teaser. A day later, ET Canada reported a US$1 million of donations to the nonprofit via the livestream, which reflects donations received by Google announced on June 3. YouTube's monetary response is also similar to that of PayPal, Bank of America, Goldman Sachs, and Nike in response to the protests. In addition to YouTube's BLM response, content policies will also be updated, preventing hate videos from spreading. A previous programming, Dear Class of 2020, also briefly highlighted the protests.

Initially, Bear Witness, Take Action livestreamed on July 13, 2020, at 6 p.m. Eastern Standard Time. And with the success of that and desire for further programming, a second installment was then made.

This special was part of the #YouTubeBlack Voices Fund, which is dedicated to helping Black creators and artists.

== Summary ==
Bear Witness, Take Action 2: Continuing the Movement is "a two-hour global conversation on racial justice featuring YouTube creators, public figures, activists and influential voices."

Bear Witness, Take Action 2: Continuing the Movement had several conversations such as a conversation about intersectionality with LGBTQ+ issues and race, led by Karamo Brown. There was an interview, led by Soledad O'Brien of Isabel Wilkerson about her book Caste: The Origins of Our Discontents. O'Brien also led a conversation on criminal justice reform.

Two of the panels focused on impacts that athletes have had on the current political conversation. Dallas Mavericks owner Mark Cuban spoke with New Orleans Saints safety Malcolm Jenkins about white privilege, civic responsibility and social justice. Skylar Diggins-Smith discussed with Jemele Hill the role athletes play in bringing about political change and what the future of athletes in activism could mean.

There was a large conversation featuring, among others, Brittany Packnett Cunningham, Malcolm Jenkins, Mari Copeny, Deepak Chopra, Mark Cuban, Harry Edwards (sociologist), Naomi Wadler, Kendrick Sampson, Kat Blaque, DeRay Mckesson that talked about how to turn thoughts into actual actions.

It also featured a performance from Rapsody.

Of hosting the follow-up special, host Keke Palmer said, "I'm honored to return to Bear Witness, Take Action and partner with YouTube in an effort to amplify Black voices and create the changes we need to see now. It is so important that we keep a dialogue about racial justice going beyond any particular moment... I want to encourage my peers to continue to have thoughtful and powerful conversations that will lead us to change. Let's talk about it, take action, and see change realized."

== Reception ==
Common Sense Media's Melissa Camacho gave it four out of five stars, exactly the same as she had rated the first special, Bear Witness, Take Action. She said of the sequel, "Perhaps the most important lesson that Bear Witness,Take Action 2 offers is that changes to a racist system takes time, and requires long-term, sustainable action by global citizens committed to ensuring that it takes place. It warns viewers about how easily an empowering movement can fizzle and become a mere moment in history if people aren't willing to put in the hard work to keep it going, especially after the initial energy behind the cause begins to dwindle. Overall, it's a call to rise above the initial reactions to racial injustice, and to focus on taking the long term, proactive steps necessary to eradicate it and save Black lives."
