= Seikin =

Japanese YouTube celebrity and singer-songwriter (born 1987)

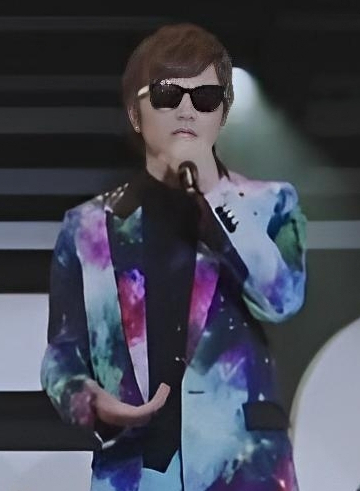
- Seikin in 2020
- Born: Seiya Kaihatsu; January 30, 1987 (age 39); Myōkō, Niigata, Japan
- Occupations: Singer songwriter; YouTuber
- Years active: 2012–present
- Spouse: Undisclosed (m. 2014)
- Relatives: Hikakin

YouTube information
- Channels: SeikinTV; SeikinGames
- Subscribers: SeikinTV : 4.77 million; SeikinGames : 1.45 million
- Views: SeikinTV : 4.7 billion; SeikinGames : 737 million
- Last updated: February 16, 2025

Seiya Kaihatsu (Japanese: 開發 聖也, Hepburn: Kaihatsu Seiya; born July 30, 1987) professionally known as Seikin (Japanese: セイキン), is a Japanese YouTuber and singer-songwriter. His younger brother is YouTuber Hikakin, who is also a member of the Japanese music group Hikakin & Seikin.

== Early life ==
On July 30, 1987, he was the eldest son to his parents in Myōkōkōgen, Nakakubiki District, Niigata Prefecture (present Myōkō City, Niigata Prefecture). As a child he longed to be a baker because of his favorite food, bread. The first video he uploaded to YouTube as "SeikinTV" was "Morning is Bread. In 2000, he entered a local junior high school, where he was a member of an a cappella group from the first year of junior high school and also joined the brass band, playing the trombone. At high school he switched from the brass band and joined the ski club, where he placed fourth in the inter-high school ski jump competition. His younger brother Hikakin recalls Seikin in high school, "Unlike me, he studied for an hour every day, even before a test".

After graduating from high school, I moved to Tokyo and enrolled in the Faculty of Letters at Senshu University, but I realized that this was not the path I wanted to follow and dropped out. After that, I worked as a part-time worker for about four years, but I realized that this lifestyle was not good, so I got a job at a company.

== Career ==
In 2012, influenced by his younger brother Hikakin, who was expanding his activities as a YouTuber on the video site, he opened the "SeikinTV" channel on YouTube.

On March 2 of the same year Seikin uploaded "Morning is Bread," a song written and performed a cappella by Seikin himself, marking his start as a YouTuber. He initially called himself an "a cappella musician," and the name "Seikin" came from a suggestion he made to his younger brother Hikakin: "I'm Hikakin, so why not Seikin?".

In 2014, his income from YouTube exceeded his salary as an office worker, and he began to work on YouTube in earnest. He then quit his job to focus on YouTube and began working as a YouTuber. On February 10 of the same year, he joined the Japanese multi-channel network Uuum.

On August 14, 2015, he released "YouTube Theme Song," which he co-wrote with his brother Hikakin. This marked the start of his musical career as Hikakin & Seikin. "YouTube Theme Song" reached number 78 on the Billboard Japan Hot 100. As of 2024, the music video has been viewed over 140 million times, making it the most viewed video on his brother Hikakin's channel, "HikakinTV".

On November 7 of the same year, he released his own song "Just Do It Now", and on July 30 of the following year, 2016, he released another solo EDM-style song, "Keep Your Head Up". The former "Just Do It Now" reached 5th place in the iTunes Overall Album Ranking, while the latter "Keep Your Head Up" only reached 4th place in the iTunes Overall Album Ranking. In the same year, the number of subscribers to the "SeikinTV" channel reached 1 million, and YouTube awarded him the "Gold Creator Award", and the following year in 2017, "SeikinGames" was awarded the "Gold Creator Award".

On March 18, 2022, Seikin's TikTok account was hijacked by an unknown individual, and all videos he had posted were deleted. Viewers who noticed the situation contacted his agency Uuum with numerous inquiries, and TikTok management, his agency, and the police immediately worked together to quickly respond. Thanks to their efforts, they were able to get their account back two days later. The next day, all of his videos were restored.

== Personal life ==
On December 25, 2014, he reported in his video that he had entered into a marriage and married a civilian woman of the same age with whom he had been dating for two and a half years. Two years later, in 2016, they had a wedding ceremony that also included a honeymoon in the state of Hawaii in the United States. He commented that the secret to a happy marriage is to "think of the other person's feelings before your own." He commented.

In April 2018, he announced the birth of his first child on his official YouTube channel. When he went into labor, he contacted his brother via Line, and Hikakin rushed to the hospital. He also posted footage of the birth on YouTube, which became a hot topic.

On May 29, 2020, Seikin purchased a Ferrari F8 Tributo for 33.28 million yen. On August 28, 2023, Seikin reported that he had purchased a Lamborghini Urus for 40 million yen (about $270,000).

== Discography ==
=== Singles ===
Title	Year	Peak chart positions	Album
Title	Year	JPN Hot	Album
"Just Do It Now"	2015	—	Non-album single
"Keep Your Head Up"	2016	—	Non-album single
