= Bear Witness, Take Action =

2020 YouTube live teleconference about racism

- The title screen, featuring a comprehensive list of victims of anti-black racism.
- Produced by: Phillip Byron; Maverick Carter; Jamal Henderson; LeBron James; Jamila Jordan
- Starring: Keke Palmer; Common
- Edited by: Welborn Ferrene
- Production companies: Fly on the Wall Entertainment; SpringHill Entertainment
- Distributed by: YouTube Premium
- Release date: June 13, 2020
- Country: United States
- Language: English
- Budget: USD100 million

Bear Witness, Take Action is a pair of American livestreams, the first one streamed on YouTube on June 13, 2020, as part of a YouTube Original programming supporting the Black Lives Matter movement in correspondence with the George Floyd protests. It gathers notable people of color in the United States such as Patrisse Cullors, Rashad Robinson, Alicia Garza, Prince Ea, John Legend, etc., and hosted by Keke Palmer and Common. It centers around the history and experiences as people of color in America, as well as exploring ways to raise awareness and end the long inequality. On November 17, 2020, it was announced that a sequel titled Bear Witness, Take Action 2: Continuing the Movement will premiere on December 5, 2020. It lasted for two hours.

== Background, production, and release ==
On May 25, 2020, George Floyd, an African-American man, was murdered by officer Derek Chauvin in Minneapolis, Minnesota, during an arrest for allegedly using a counterfeit bill. Chauvin knelt on Floyd's neck for over nine minutes, as Floyd begged for his life and repeatedly said "I can't breathe."

As a result, an ongoing series of protests and civil unrest began, starting in Minneapolis, as part of the Black Lives Matter movement. "I can't breathe" became a human rights slogan, heard chanted in nearly all protests created nationally and globally.

Representing YouTube, CEO Susan Wojcicki says that YouTube will be doing a US$100 million "project" to "amplify and develop the voices of [b]lack creators and artists and their stories," which will be a YouTube Original program "bring[ing] together creators, artists, influential public figures and prominent activist voices for roundtable discussions and musical performances." Viewers can also choose to donate to the Equal Justice Initiative (EJI) via an icon set to the livestream. In the livestream's teaser. A day later, ET Canada reported a US$1 million of donations to the nonprofit via the livestream, which reflects donations received by Google announced on June 3. YouTube's monetary response is also similar to that of PayPal, Bank of America, Goldman Sachs, and Nike in response to the protests. In addition to YouTube's BLM response, content policies will also be updated, preventing hate videos from spreading. A previous programming, Dear Class of 2020, also briefly highlighted the protests.

A 39-second teaser was posted two days before. The teaser also featured an icon to the EJI. The teaser featured several lonely-looking shots, backgrounded with protesters chanting. The livestreamed is then streamed on July 13, 2020, at 6 p.m. Eastern Standard Time.

== Summary ==
The livestream is divided into 21 sequences, or chapters.

The second chapter, titled 20 Days of Unrest, is a grayscale-altered mashup of footages related to racism in America. Attorney Bryan Stevenson talks about the history of slavery and racism in the United States. Soledad O'Brien interviews Kimberlé Crenshaw, Kimberly Foster, and Rashad Robinson around the theme "rethinking justice." The next chapter, Enough is Enough, is a mashup of notable YouTubers talking about police brutality and xenophobia. O'Brien then interviews YouTuber Amber Whittington, Alicia Garza, and Minnesota Fats. Next, Trey Songz performs song "How Many Times."

A number of white YouTubers show support against racism. Next, Roland Martin interviews Chaz Smith, Michael Skolnik, and Eddie Glaude, Jr., under the theme "white privilege". Next is spoken word In Here, Out There, followed by Indya Moore doing the same thing centering on LGBTQ+ people of color. Roland interviews Bakari Sellers, Baratunde Thurston, and Roxane Gay. Several people then made a "message" to those died of racism, followed by a moment of silence.

O'Brien interviews Prince Ea, Jouelzy, and Patrisse Cullors, regarding "bear[ing] witness." Brittany Howard performs "13th Century Metal," followed by a spoken word by several people, and an interview by Jemele Hill with Baratunde Thurston, Kimberly Jones, and Andrew Hawkins. Next is a motivational video titled Pledge, followed by a speech by Susan Wojcicki, and John Legend covering Bob Marley's "Redemption Song." The end sequence features resources regarding the topic.

== Reception ==
Common Sense Media's Melissa Camacho gave it four out of five stars. She labeled the "character strengths" as what the livestream stand out for. She said that it "offers a unified narrative about what the problems are and what needs to be done," and says that "Bear Witness, Take Action is designed to inspire people to go beyond simply reacting to racism on social media, and instead take proactive steps to ensure that people and institutions are held accountable for their racist behaviors. Only then can America start to heal and finally bring about change."
