= Super Mario Beatbox =

2010 YouTube video by Hikakin

- Thumbnail of "Super Mario Beatbox"
- Starring: Hikakin
- Release date: 17 June 2010
- Running time: 2:20
- Country: Japan
- Language: Japanese

"Super Mario Beatbox" is a human beatboxing performance video by Japanese YouTuber and beatboxer Hikaru Kaihatsu, professionally known as Hikakin, uploaded to YouTube on June 17, 2010. The video features Hikakin performing various sound effects and background music from the Nintendo game Super Mario Bros. using only his mouth. It is widely considered the major turning point in his career, leading to international recognition and his eventual transition into a full-time YouTuber.

== Background and production ==
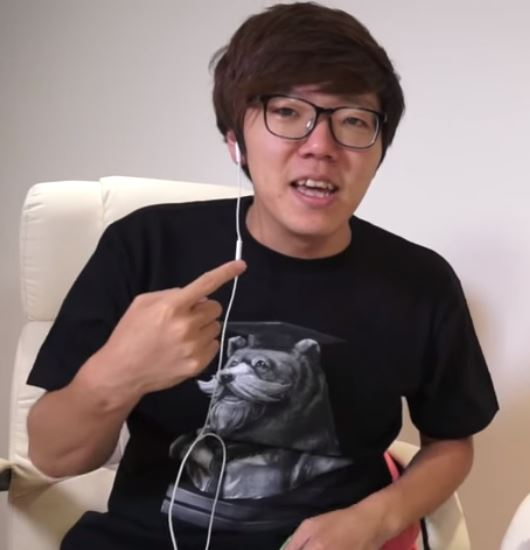
Hikaru Kaihatsu (pictured in 2015) released the video in 2010.

At the time of the video's release in 2010, Hikakin was 21 years old and working as a clerk at a supermarket in Tokyo after moving from Niigata Prefecture, Japan. Although he had started his YouTube channel in 2006, his early content consisted mainly of covers of Western artists like Lady Gaga and Daft Punk, which struggled to gain significant traction. The decision to perform a Super Mario themed beatbox was suggested by a friend. While the routine was a "staple" in his live performances at clubs, Hikakin was initially hesitant to upload it to YouTube, thinking the theme was outdated. However, persistent encouragement from his friend eventually led him to record and post the video. The video was produced in a modest setting, filmed inside the bathroom of his company dormitory to prevent sound from leaking to neighbors through the thin walls. He used an inexpensive microphone and recorded the performance in a cramped posture.

The video features Hikakin performing the iconic "Overworld" theme from Super Mario Bros., interspersed with sound effects such as collecting coins, jumping, and entering pipes. Technically, the performance utilizes a "multiphonic" technique where the performer sings a melody (often in falsetto) while simultaneously producing percussive sounds like bass drums, snares, and hi-hats. Hikakin explained in interviews that while he can produce only two distinct sounds at once, he uses complex techniques to make it sound as if three or more sounds are being played simultaneously.

== Reception and impact ==
The video became an immediate viral video, surpassing 1 million views within a week and 2 million views within two weeks. By September 2010, it had reached over 3.8 million views, making it the most-viewed YouTube video in Japan for that month.

The success extended beyond Japan; CBS News reported on the video, stating that Hikakin had "turned the iconic sounds of Super Mario into a viral video hit". It was also featured on the front page of Yahoo! in the United States as an "Amazing Japanese guy".

The breakthrough led to numerous television appearances for Hikakin, including on shows such as Sekai o Kaeru 100-nin no Nihonjin and Hamonepu League, where he became a finalist in the beatbox category. Most significantly, the success of "Super Mario Beatbox" and a subsequent meeting with American YouTuber Michelle Phan in 2011 convinced Hikakin to pursue YouTube as a full-time career. He resigned from his supermarket job in January 2012, becoming a pioneer of professional YouTubing in Japan.
