= YouTube Theme Song =

2015 single by Hikakin and Seikin

Single by Hikakin & Seikin

from the EP YouTube Theme Song
- Language: Japanese
- Released: August 13, 2015
- Length: 4:28
- Label: UUUM
- Songwriter: Seikin

Hikakin & Seikin singles chronology
| "YouTube Theme Song" (2015) | "Zasso" (2017) |

YouTube Theme Song (ユーチューブテーマソング) is the first single by Hikakin & Seikin; it was independently produced and music distributed on August 13, 2015. A CD+DVD version was released by UUUM on November 21 of the same year. This song is an independent production and is not the "official" theme song of YouTube.

== Background ==
This song was originally written and composed by Hikakin's brother Seikin in 2012, and was originally released as a one-chorus a cappella version on YouTube.

Seikin finished the a cappella version to full length, and TeddyLoid, an old friend of Hikakin, arranged and produced the entire song, creating a pop tune with dubstep elements.

All recording was done at TeddyLoid's home studio, and a new music video was also produced.

== Music video ==
The music video is available on HikakinTV, and a making-of video is also available. In less than a month, the music video has been viewed more than 10 million times on YouTube. In May 2020, the music video surpassed 100 million views on YouTube, becoming the first video among all HikakinTV videos to reach 100 million views.

== Tetsuya Komuro Rearrange ==
A year and a half after its release, "YouTube Theme Song-Tetsuya Komuro Rearrange-," a rearrangement by music producer Tetsuya Komuro, was released on AWA, and about six months later, it was also released on iTunes Store, Recochoku, etc. HIKAKIN The unique collaboration between Hikakin & Seikin and Tetsuya Komuro became a hot topic.

== Track listing ==
All tracks are written by Seikin.

| No. | Title | Length |
|---|---|---|
| 1. | "YouTube Theme Song" | 4:27 |
| 2. | "YouTube Theme Song（TeddyLoid Acoustic Remix）" | 4:27 |
| 3. | "HIKAKIN BEATBOX PARADE" | 3:46 |
| 4. | "YouTune Theme Song（instrumental）" | 4:27 |
| 5. | "YouTube Theme Song（Karaoke）" | 4:27 |
| Total length: | | 21:34 |

== Charts ==
| Chart | Peak position |
|---|---|
| Japan (Japan Hot 100) | 78 |
