= Pocky (YouTuber) =

Japanese YouTuber (born 1998)

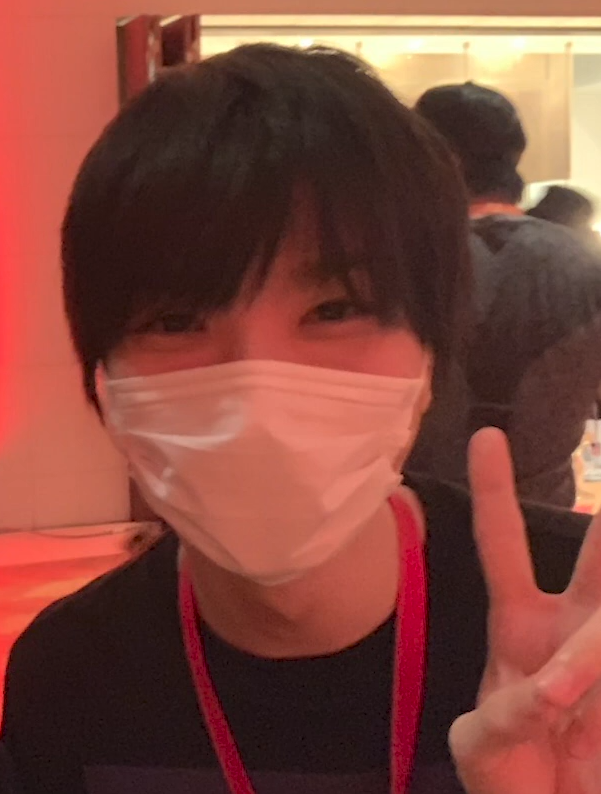
- Pocky at the YouTube Creator Summit in Tokyo, 2019
- Born: January 26, 1998 (age 28); Mie, Japan
- Occupation: YouTuber

YouTube information
- Channel: ポッキー
- Years active: 2013 – present
- Genre: Let's Play
- Subscribers: 3.77 million
- Views: 4.13 billion
- Last updated: March 3, 2026

Pocky (Japanese: ポッキー, Hepburn: Pokkī; born January 26, 1998) is the pseudonym of a Japanese gaming YouTuber. He often posted let's plays of him playing horror video games. As of March 2026, he amassed over 3.7 million subscribers on YouTube.

== Early life ==
Pocky was born on January 26, 1998. He is from Mie Prefecture. He said that he always wanted to become a pilot when he was a child. He said that his first gaming experience was when he found his father's Super Nintendo when he was 8 years old, and played Disney's Magical Quest and Cool Boarders on it. He received his first console, a Game Boy Advance SP, when he was in sixth grade and played Mario vs. Donkey Kong. He later moved to Tokyo after graduating from high school.

== Streaming career ==
Pocky started posting videos and live streaming on the internet in 2011 when he was 13 after watching other let's play videos, and after he bought his computer with his New Year's Day allowance. His first video is a let's play of Monster Hunter Portable 2nd G. He officially launched his current channel in 2013. His channel was named after his dog "Pocky", which he got when he was in the fourth year of elementary school. It died in June 2023.

A game about his dog was created and later launched in 2024 developed by Baka. He said that he was influenced by his father, who also loves gaming. He started posting let's play for various foreign games like Goat Simulator, Grand Theft Auto V and Happy Wheels and stated that he was influenced by foreign YouTubers like PewDiePie.

In 2014, he was approached by a Uuum, a YouTuber agency, and became a member of the agency. He left Uuum in December 2020. In 2024, he was selected as one of the TGS Indie Game Ambassadors for three consecutive years. In an interview with the Japanese magazine An An, he said that he spent four hours each day playing and filming games.
