= Mahoto Watanabe =

Japanese YouTuber and rapper

- ワタナベマホト
- Born: Mahoto Watanabe (渡邉 摩萌峡, Watanabe Mahoto); December 8, 1992 (age 33); Saiki, Ōita, Japan
- Other names: Sashiman; Bema
- Occupations: YouTuber; rapper
- Years active: 2007–2021
- Partner: Yui Imaizumi (2021–2024)
- Children: 2

YouTube information
- Channels: Mahoto; Maho-chan Games; Mahoto Watanabe (terminated); Mahoto (terminated)
- Genre: Vlog
- Subscribers: 4.86 million (combined) (Note: Statistics were taken prior to Watanabe's channels, Mahoto Watanabe and Mahoto, being terminated on January 28, 2021.)
- Views: 2.89 billion (combined)
- Musical career
- Genre: Japanese hip hop
- Labels: Neo Kinder Records (2013–2018); Avex (2019)
- Formerly of: Kaiware Hummer
- Last updated: January 23, 2021

Mahoto Watanabe (ワタナベマホト, Watanabe Mahoto; born December 8, 1992) is a former Japanese YouTuber and rapper. He was part of the hip hop group Kaiware Hummer, releasing music under the stage name Bema.

Watanabe first began posting videos on Nico Douga in 2007 and transitioned to YouTube in 2010, becoming one of the first YouTube personalities on YouTube Japan. He gained popularity with his radical video style, but he was also known for his caring personality for his junior YouTubers, who called him "Oyakata". He is famous for having trained up popular YouTubers such as Tokai On Air, Avntis, and Hekitora House.

In January 2021, Watanabe allegedly solicited nude photos from an underage fan, which subsequently caused his agency Uuum to drop him as an act and YouTube to permanently ban his channel. In March 2021, he announced he was retiring from YouTube.

== Career ==
On November 7, 2007, when Watanabe was in middle school, he posted on Niconico under the username Sashiman (サシマン). Watanabe began uploading to YouTube in 2010.

In 2013, after signing with Genesis One, Watanabe became a member of the hip hop group called Kaiware Hummer with his fellow member Imiga and began his career as a rapper. Kaiware Hummer released their debut album, Beginner, under Neo Kinder Records on July, 12 2014. In addition, Watanabe released his debut solo album, Shinryakuteki Sukima, on November 26, 2016. In 2015, Watanabe made his acting debut in the Squash Films' drama titled Dancing Office Worker.

In 2018, Watanabe left Genesis One and signed with Uuum as his network. By June 2019, he had over 2.7 million subscribers on his main channel. After getting arrested on suspicion of battery in the same month, his activities were cancelled for the remainder of the year, including a new label contract between with Avex and an appearance of Kaiware Hummer at A-Nation 2019, while he remained at Uuum to do clerical work. On February 7, 2020, Uuum announced that Watanabe would resume activities on February 14, 2020 on a new channel.

On January 22, 2021, Uuum announced that Watanabe had been dismissed from the agency after confirming he solicited nude photos from an underage girl. On January 28, 2021, YouTube suspended his channel for community violations. Following the events, on March 2, 2021, Watanabe issued an apology on Twitter and also announced he was retiring from YouTube.

Since his retirement from YouTube, Watanabe started editing videos for Gardman, a YouTube channel with 2 million subscribers, earning him a million yen a month.

== Personal life ==
On January 21, 2021, Watanabe announced that he was marrying actress and former Keyakizaka46 member Yui Imaizumi and that they were expecting a child. The child, a daughter was born in June 2021. Following Watanabe's 2021 arrest, Imaizumi announced in July 2021 that she would not be registering their marriage and that she would be raising the child herself with support from her family.

=== Legal troubles ===
On June 2, 2019, Watanabe was arrested on suspicion of battery. He had reportedly beat a female acquaintance and stomped on her face during an argument while he was intoxicated. On June 19, 2019, he issued an apology and also claimed he reconciled with the victim. On July 18, 2019, Uuum later stated that Watanabe's activities would be suspended, including Kaiware Hummer's appearance at A-nation 2019. Instead, he would be doing clerical work within the agency until December 31, 2019, though there were no immediate plans of him returning in January 2020. During this period, he was also prohibited from drinking.

On January 21, 2021, the same day where Watanabe announced his marriage to Yui Imaizumi, Japanese YouTuber Korekore posted a live stream video where a 15-year-old girl alleged Watanabe had solicited nude photos from her and then blackmailed her with them, with screenshots of private messages from November 2020. On January 22, 2021, Uuum announced that Watanabe confirmed the reports and was dismissed from the agency. The victim later contacted the police, which resulted in Watanabe being arrested on suspicion of forced child prostitution and possession of child pornography on March 17, 2021 after investigation. He was released on April 2, 2021 and indicted by the Tokyo Metropolitan Police Department on April 22 of the same year. On June 14, 2021, he was fined ¥500,000.

On March 22, 2024, Watanabe was arrested on suspicion of allegedly assaulting his ex-wife, including pushing her to the ground, on March 21.

== Discography ==
=== Studio albums ===
List of studio albums, with selected chart positions, sales figures and certifications
Year	Title	Details	Peak chart positions	Sales
Year	Title	Details	JPN	Sales
2016	Shinryakuteki Sukima (侵略的隙間)	Released: November 26, 2016; Label: Neo Kinder Records; Format: CD	—	—
"—" denotes releases that did not chart or were not released in that region.

=== Extended plays ===
List of extended plays, with selected chart positions, sales figures and certifications
Year	Title	Details	Peak chart positions	Sales
Year	Title	Details	JPN	Sales
2016	Happy no Daidasshutsu Ōgontō to Ikari no Wana (ハッピィの大脱出 黄金刀と怒りの罠) (with Yukon)	Released: April 28, 2019; Label: Neo Kinder Records; Format: digital download	—	—
"—" denotes releases that did not chart or were not released in that region.

=== Singles ===
As featured artist

Year	Title	Other artists	Album
2013	Flower	Aimi Sekiguchi	Sakasama/Flower
2016	Anemone (アネモネ)	Ryoji Takarabe	Season 1
2016	Stalking Vampire	Ryoji Takarabe	Season 1
2016	Kokomo	Ryoji Takarabe	Season 2
2016	Hella	Saguwa	Scramble
2016	Still Full Tune	U-kon	Scramble
2016	Kaeri no Kai (帰りの会)	Jin Kawaguchi	Scramble
2016	Nakamaya (仲間家)	Saguwa, Soma Transistor, Hekiho and Jin Kawaguchi	Scramble
2018	Higashitoumi	Toshimitsu	Scramble Vol.2
2018	Show Case	Sho Takeyaki	Scramble Vol.2
2018	Pump Me Up	Little (from Kick the Can Crew) and Oma	Scramble Vol.2

== Filmography ==
=== Movies ===
Year	Title	Role	Production	Network
2018	Stalking Vampire (隙間男)	Himself	Squash Films	YouTube Premium

=== Dramas ===
Year	Title	Role	Production	Network
2015	Dancing Office Worker (サラリーマンは踊る)	Himself	Squash Films	YouTube
2015	Stalking Vampire 2 (隙間男2)	Anti Ryunosuke	Squash Films	YouTube
2016	Blue Episode-0 Kokomo Days (日々ココモ)	Summer Fairy	Squash Films	YouTube
2017	Satan (魔王)	Himself	Squash Films	YouTube
2018	Shooting Star (シューティングスター)	Yuichi	Squash Films	YouTube

== Publications ==
Year	Title	Publisher	ISBN
2015	Shu Shu Shu no Hon (しゅしゅしゅの本~ワタナベマホトDVD付き1stリスナーズBOOK~)	Kadokawa	ISBN 978-4-0473-0638-7
2016	Nya Nya Nya no Hon (にゃにゃにゃの本~YouTuber・ワタナベマホトと猫たち~)	Kadokawa	ISBN 978-4-0473-4317-7
2017	Kaiware Hummer Monogatari Part 1 (カイワレハンマー物語・上) (as co-author)	Kadokawa	ISBN 978-4-0473-4660-4
2017	Kaiware Hummer Monogatari Part 2 (カイワレハンマー物語・下) (as co-author)	Kadokawa	ISBN 978-4-0473-4661-1
