= Hajime Syacho =

Japanese YouTuber (born 1993)

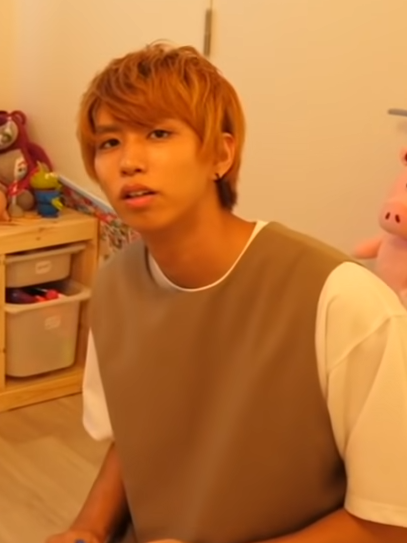
- Hajime Syacho in 2020
- Born: Hajime Eda (江田 元); 14 February 1993 (age 32); Tonami, Japan
- Occupation: YouTuber

YouTube information
- Channels: Hajime Syacho; Hajime Syacho 2; Hajime Syacho’s Field
- Genre: Creator
- Subscribers: 15.7 million (Hajime Syacho); 3.01 million (Hajime Syacho 2); 2.1 million (Hajime Syacho's Field)
- Views: 12.4 billion (Hajime Syacho); 1.29 billion (Hajime Syacho 2); 2.26 billion (Hajime Syacho's Field)
- Last updated: February 26, 2025

Hajime Eda (江田 元, Eda Hajime; born 14 February 1993), known professionally as Hajime Syacho (はじめしゃちょー, Hajime Shachō; lit. President Hajime), is a Japanese YouTuber who, as of March 2019, had the largest number of YouTube channel subscribers in Japan. He is part of the multi-channel network UUUM. He is nicknamed Hajimen (はじめん) and Moyashi (もやし).

== Biography ==
=== Early life ===
He was born on February 14, 1993, in Tonami, Toyama. He was named "Hajime" (元) because of his parents' desire for him to be energetic and healthy (元気).

When he was in middle school and high school, he became vice chairman on his school's student council. He said that at school he was "the type who was always on the edge of the group."

He has enjoyed making videos since high school, when he recorded videos with friends for fun such as "taking underwear off while wearing trousers," etc.

Because he dedicated most of his time to the basketball team, his high school grades were not good, but his girlfriend at the time entered university on recommendation admission (a kind of admission that allows someone to submit a recommendation letter and enter a school without taking an exam). He started studying for about ten hours a day and gained the top score for the mock test in his school. However, his test results on the National Center Test for University Admissions were 150 points lower than the benchmark score, so he went to Shizuoka University, which was not his first choice, following advice from a high school faculty member. After that, having broken up with his girlfriend, he began posting videos he made with his friends during college freshman year on YouTube, thinking, "I'm going to focus on me. " (Note: Other reasons he cited for starting YouTube were that he "wanted to remember fond memories from life," that "the university's circle was boring," and that he "wanted to try new things.")

=== YouTube ===
In March 2012, he and his university classmate set up his video team "Hajime Company" and started posting videos on YouTube. His first video only had three recorded views. (Note: He said, "I watched the video nine times myself, so it must be at least twelve views. That number is wrong.") After that, he opened a personal channel and changed his YouTube name from "Hajime-shachō" (はじめ社長; President Hajime) to Hajime Syacho (はじめしゃちょー).

From September 2013 until March 2014, he studied English in the United Kingdom. After returning to Japan on April 1, 2014, he announced his affiliation with the group UUUM.

He appeared in the YouTube Japan television advertisement "Suki na koto de, Ikite iku" in June 2015. Along with this, his full-page ads were posted in Weekly Shōnen Jump and Shibuya 109, and his exposure on media other than YouTube also increased. Shooting commercials interfered with his university studies, so after consideration he decided not to worry about school and focus most of his energy on making videos, saying, "you only live once, so you should make your life interesting"

In March 2016, in addition to gaining the most subscribers on YouTube Japan, he graduated from university.

In February 2017, he opened a fee-based fan site "Hajimeno."

In March 2017, Mizunyan, a webcaster, exposed Hajime Syacho's cheating scandal with Yuka Kinoshita, who also belongs to UUUM. In addition, he was suspected of having a relationship with a female model who stayed overnight at his home. In response, he released a video admitting to cheating, but denying a relationship with the model. On March 30 of the same year, he announced his suspension of activities on his fan club site. He later resumed his activities on YouTube on 12 May.

In 2017, a female fan stalked him. In the beginning of November, the woman approached Hajime Syacho's house and received a restraining order from the police. In December she was arrested for violating the restraining order after she was caught breaking into his house. The woman was later arrested in February 2018 for stalking another YouTuber.

== Personal life ==
He has three channels on YouTube. His main channel contains random videos regardless of the genre such as experiments, hidden camera, Q&A videos, and product reviews. On his sub-channel he deals mainly with daily stories about his life, Let's Play, collecting Yu-Gi-Oh! cards, and promotional videos for companies. His third channel deals with his life with his roommates.

The reason he passionately posts videos is that his upbringing was strict and his family discouraged creativity.

He announced his marriage on 30 August 2025.

=== Influence ===
Besides YouTube, his number of followers on Twitter is fifth largest in Japan and his top record of viewers on TwitCasting is ninth largest.

He often plans activities using his influence, and in 2015 he recruited 740 participants in an event in Yokohama City, Kanazawa Ward. The event broke the Guinness World Record for the largest number of participants in a game of statues.

Additionally, upon request from companies, he frequently posts product review videos and participates in events and campaigns.

Meanwhile, in a video called, "I will study abroad in the United States for 3 years", he posted his home's security camera videos and talked about having to move due to viewers repeatedly coming to his home. Many of his videos, such as "wasting Nivea cream", "suspected cheating", "destruction of golf clubs", and "turning a broken computer into tempura", have been picked up by online news outlets, which results in him being flamed frequently.

He said he puts a warning message before videos with dangerous content telling viewers not to imitate him, and although such videos are legal, videos judged as too dangerous were later made private.

== Appearances ==
=== TV programmes ===
- Zattsu! Kōhaku Senden-bu (25 Dec 2015, NHK G)—Kōhaku Uta Gassen (31 Dec 2015, NHK G)
- Minna de Tsukuru: Minchan! (5 Jul – 27 Dec 2016, Tokyo MX)

=== Internet TV ===
- 72-Jikan Honne TV (3 Nov 2017, AbemaTV Abema Special)
- P-Sports ~Mezase, Pokémon Battle Master!~ (24 Jan 2018 –, AbemaTV Ultra Games) – P-Sports Shitennō

=== Advertisements ===
- YouTube "Suki na koto de, Ikite iku" (Jun 2015)
- Maze Runner: The Scorch Trials (Oct 2015)
- The Seven Deadly Sins (Aug 2016)

=== Voice acting ===
- Paper Rabbit Rope – as himself (Lion) (29 Nov 2016, 6 Feb 2017)
- Yu-Gi-Oh! Sevens; President Goha (11 April 2020 - 16 Jan 2021) and Goha Drone/Doll (16 Jan 2021 - ??)
- Dr. Stone (season 2) as Tetsuya Kinomoto

=== Events ===
- Mission: Impossible – Rogue Nation Japan premiere (3 Aug 2015)
- Tokyo Game Show (2015, 2016)

== Publications ==
- Hajime Syacho Photo Book (released 26 Aug 2015, Kodansha) ISBN 978-4-06-364972-7
- Hajime Syacho Photo Book -Sotsugyō- (released 21 Jul 2016, Kodansha) ISBN 978-4-06-364995-6
