= Hikakin =

Japanese YouTuber and beatboxer (born 1989)

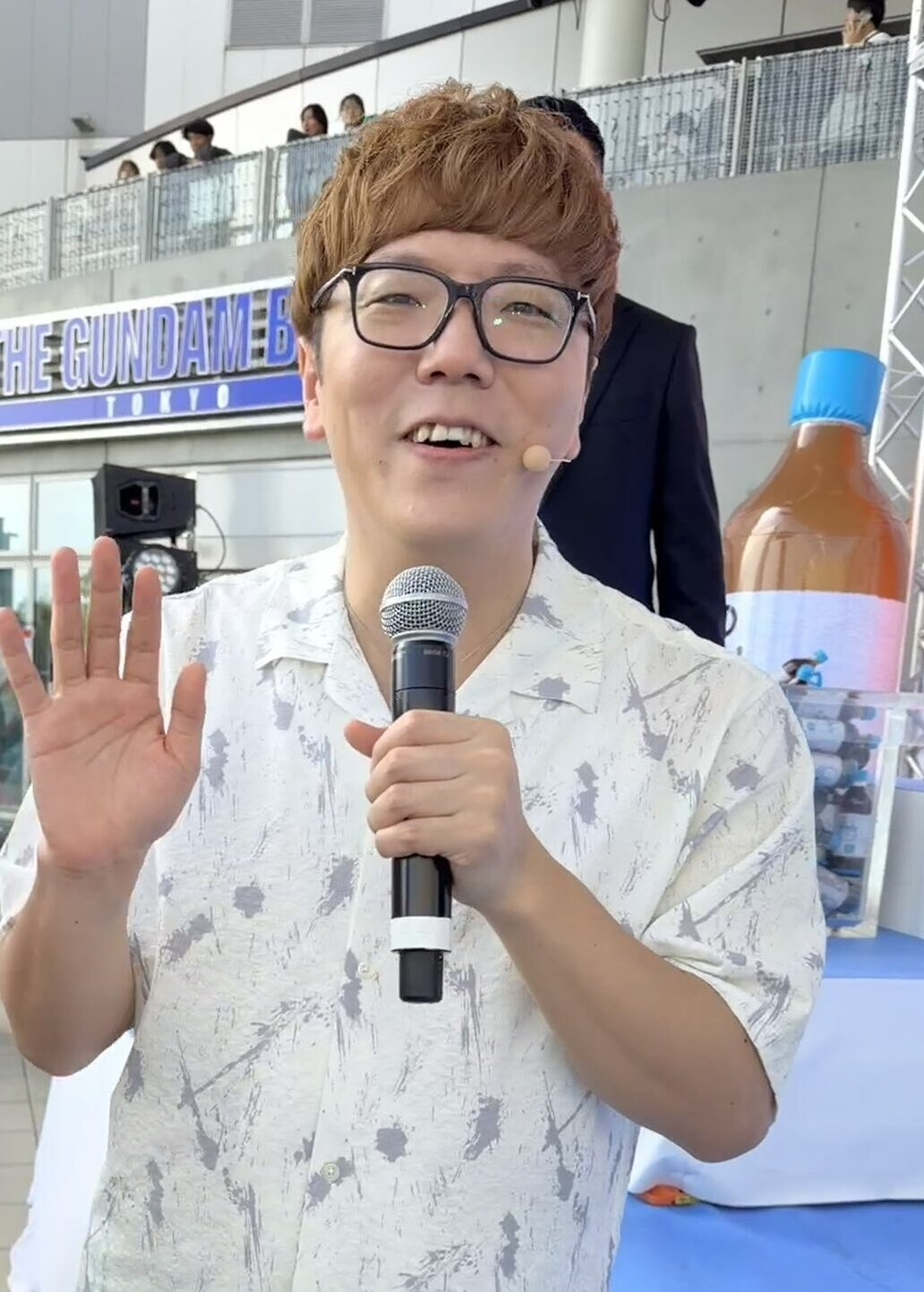
- Hikakin in Odaiba, Tokyo, 2026
- Born: Hikaru Kaihatsu; April 21, 1989 (age 37); Myōkō, Niigata, Japan
- Occupations: Human beatbox; YouTuber; Businessman
- Spouse: Undisclosed (m. 2024)
- Children: 2
- Relatives: Seikin (brother)

YouTube information
- Channels: HikakinTV; HIKAKIN; HikakinGames
- Years active: 2006–present
- Genres: Music; entertainment; gaming; vlogs
- Subscribers: 20 million (HikakinTV); 6.7 million (HikakinGames); 2.55 million (Hikakin)
- Views: 16.8 billion (HikakinTV); 8.8 billion (HikakinGames); 548 million (Hikakin)
- Musical career
- Label: Uuum Records
- Member of: Hikakin & Seikin
- Hikakin's intro greeting
- Last updated: November 21, 2026
- Website: uuum.jp

Hikaru Kaihatsu (Japanese: 開發 光, Hepburn: Kaihatsu Hikaru; born April 21, 1989), who is professionally known as Hikakin (Japanese: ヒカキン), is a Japanese YouTuber, beatboxer, and businessman. He co-founded and is supreme advisor of the Japanese multi-channel network Uuum. He also established, and serves as co-CEO and Chief creative officer of the company Bee. Hikakin is also a member of the Japanese music group Hikakin & Seikin. His popularity on YouTube and extensive media coverage have made him one of Japan's most-prominent online personalities and content creators.

Hikakin was born and raised in Myōkō City, Niigata Prefecture. He opened his YouTube channel "Hikakin" in 2006, posting mainly beatboxing videos. In 2010, he posted "Super Mario Beatbox", a beatbox medley of music from Super Mario Bros., which gained over a million views in one week. In 2012, he quit his supermarket to focus on his YouTube channel. In 2015, he began producing music, including the "YouTube Theme Song", which he co-wrote with his brother Seikin, and in November of the same year, his channel "HikakinTV" exceeded 2.57 million subscribers, making it the most-subscribed-to YouTube channel in Japan.

In 2021, his YouTube channel "HikakinTV" surpassed 10 million subscribers and by 2022, "HikakinTV" had accumulated more than 10 billion views. In 2023, Hikakin launched his brand Hikakin Premium (currently known as Bee), and released cup ramen, "Misokin Rich Miso Ramen" (みそきん 濃厚味噌ラーメン), and cup rice, "Misokin Rich Miso Meshi" (みそきん 濃厚味噌メシ), at 7-Eleven stores in Japan, which had sold 60 million meals in July 2026. On April 21, 2026, he launched the barley tea "Onicha" (鬼茶) and two months later, sales surpassed 7.5 million bottles. In November of the same year, the number of subscribers to his YouTube channel, "HikakinTV," reached 20 million.

Hikakin's seven YouTube channels have more than 30.7 million subscribers and 26.7 billion views, and as of November 2026, his main channel, "HikakinTV", is the eighth-most-subscribed-to YouTube channel in Japan. His online popularity has boosted sales of the video games he plays and inspired support for charitable fundraising. Hikakin has been nominated in the International category at the 10th and 12th Streamy Awards, and Forbes Japan named him one of the "Top 50 Influencers" in 2019.

== Early life ==
Hikaru Kaihatsu was born on April 21, 1989, in Myōkōkōgen, Nakakubiki District, Niigata Prefecture (present Myōkō City, Niigata Prefecture). He has an older brother, Seikin, who is also a YouTube content creator. As a child he was noted as a strange boy in the corner of the classroom. They grew up in the snowy Jōetsu region. When he was attending elementary school, Hikaru's dream was to participate in Olympic ski jumping, and he continued to ski jump until high school. During elementary school, he became interested in Human Beatboxing through the segment Fullpower Gogogo!! on the Fuji Television variety show "Hamonepu League".

Hikaru was educated at Myōkōkōgen Minami Elementary School (later Myoko City), Myoko Junior High School (present Myoko Municipal Myoko Junior High School), he entered Niigata Prefectural Arai High School. and Niigata Prefectural Arai High School, and went to Tokyo. Some supermarkets in Tokyo employed people from Niigata Prefecture, and he found employment at the Japanese supermarket Yoshiike (吉池). At that time he had no bank account and therefore no savings, and went to Tokyo with only 20,000 yen given by his parents. The supermarket where he worked had a company dormitory, the rent for which was deducted from his monthly salary, so he did not have to find a place to live.

== Career ==
=== 2006–2010: Career beginnings and breakthrough ===
Kaihatsu started his YouTube channel "Hikakin" in December 2006. He opened account so he could watch videos of overseas beatboxers, and started uploading his own videos to it. He started posting videos soon after opening the account but later deleted it, so few videos from that time remain, the oldest being a beatbox video he filmed in 2007 while at high school. Since then, he recorded a number of beatbox videos using a cheap microphone in the bathroom of the company dormitory or in his room at night, uploading one or two videos a month.

Kaihatsu applied to become a YouTube partner, a system for earning advertising revenue, but was rejected. After this, he wanted to get offers from YouTube, and began to make videos from the viewer's point of view. For about two years after his arrival in Tokyo, his channel's views gradually increased, and the most-popular video at the time had about 200,000 views. YouTube was not well-known in Japan, and only about 10-20% of its content originated in Japan.

On June 17, 2010, Kaihatsu uploaded "Super Mario Beatbox", a beatbox medley of music from the video game Super Mario Bros. This was the most popular YouTube video of the month in Japan, and was featured on CBS News in the United States. The video reached 200,000 views within 24 hours of upload, and a million views a week later, and was featured on Yahoo's homepage, and Hikakin received interview requests from two Japanese television stations. Later, he received an offer from YouTube to join its partnership program. In 2010, he was selected as one of the world's top 500 YouTube partners, and won the "WOW Star Project 2010" organized by the Japanese broadcaster Wowow, earning an invitation to Las Vegas. These events led to a gradual increase in requests to perform live and on television shows.

=== 2011–2014: Rise to Fame ===
In June 2011, Hikakin attended the YouTube Partner Forum in Japan. Inspired by a speech by American YouTuber Michelle Phan at the event, he began focusing more seriously on video production. Later that year, he entered the "YouTube NextUp 2011" contest, which awarded two million yen (about US$12,800) to ten winners, intending to become a full-time creator, but he was not selected. Following this, he sought guidance from Tomohiro Sato, a YouTuber advisor, who provided him with video-creation handbooks and personal advice. He also analyzed and adapted editing techniques, titles, and thumbnails from top domestic and international creators. Within approximately three months, Hikakin's YouTube revenue surpassed his salary from his job.

After achieving success with his beatboxing videos, Hikakin realized he would reach his limit, and in July 2011, he opened a new channel, "HikakinTV", to show his daily life. The channel quickly became a success, and by the end of 2011, the "Hikakin" channel had the most subscribers in Japan. In 2012, he left his job at the supermarket and began to make a living from YouTube advertising revenue. Regarding his time as an office worker, he said, "It was hard because I wasn't doing what I loved. But I was able to continue working thanks to my determination, thinking, 'I'm not just an office worker. I make videos and people from overseas are watching them'". By this time, the number of subscribers to his YouTube channel had surpassed 360,000.

In December 2012, Hikakin released his first album, a collaboration with video-game composer Hideki Sakamoto, for the soundtrack of Echannel Sound Channel, a drawing application for the PlayStation Vita. In May 2013, Hikakin participated in the Social Star Awards and the subsequent Singapore Social concerts, performing with Aerosmith, beatboxing and performing with the band on "Walk This Way". A month later, he founded the Japanese multi-channel network Uuum and became its chief advisor. Two months later, he published his first book, My work is YouTube (僕の仕事はYouTube, Boku no shigoto wa YouTube) , through the Japanese publisher Housewife and Lifesha, and sales surpassed 30,000 copies.

At the end of 2013, Hikakin received an offer from the Japanese anti-aging cosmetics company Angfa and appeared in a television commercial for its "Scalp D" (スカルプD) shampoo. This marked his first appearance in a television commercial. In February, he collaborated with American singer Ariana Grande, beatboxing to her song "Baby I". On June 27, 2014, in collaboration with Google, Hikakin started a live video project called "HikakinGames with Google Play" for game apps available on Google Play.

In October 2014, Hikakin performed at the first YouTube FanFest in Tokyo, Japan. At the same event, Japanese breakbeat-music duo Hifana performed with instruments and using Hikakin's beatbox broken down into several parts, and created a new combination of these elements.

In December 2014, Hikakin went to New York City to collaborate with Ariana Grande, beatboxing while she was singing "Break Free". In the same month, Hikakin uploaded a video that featured American singer Ne-Yo. They performed Ne-Yo's song "Coming with You" and his 2007 hit "Because of You". He also appeared in YouTube Rewind video, YouTube Rewind: Turn Down for 2014.

=== 2015–2023: Mainstream success ===
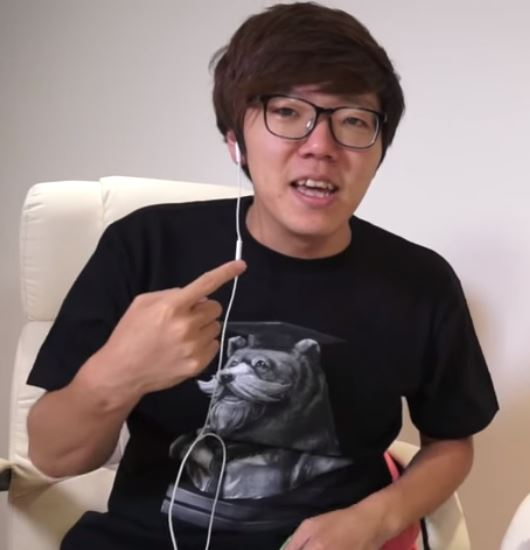
Hikakin in 2015

On August 14, 2015, Hikakin released "YouTube Theme Song" which he co-produced with his older brother, Seikin. From this point, the pair began to produce music as Hikakin & Seikin. "YouTube Theme Song" reached number 78 on the Billboard Japan Hot 100. As of 2024, it has surpassed 100 million views, becoming the most-viewed video on his channel "HikakinTV". In November of the same year, "HikakinTV" surpassed 2.57 million subscribers, making it the most-subscribed-to YouTube channel in Japan.

On December 22, 2017, Hikakin became the first YouTuber to appear on Music Station Super Live. On May 12, he worked with members of SMAP on Fuji Television's SMAPxSMAP. In 2019, Forbes Japan included him in its "Top Influencers 50" list.

On April 10, 2020, on his YouTube channel, Hikakin posted a video featuring a conversation with Tokyo Governor Yuriko Koike about the COVID-19 pandemic, in response to Hikakin's suggestion. This video was viewed more than seven million times within 24 hours of its release. Forbes Japan stated this video is "easy to spread" because it was not monetized and included no advertisements. In an interview with BuzzFeed Japan, he later stated he believed influencers should use their platforms to provide accurate information to young people and hoped his content would benefit others in the future. On December 8, 2020, the video was ranked number one in YouYube's official list of "Domestic Annual Top Trending Ranking".

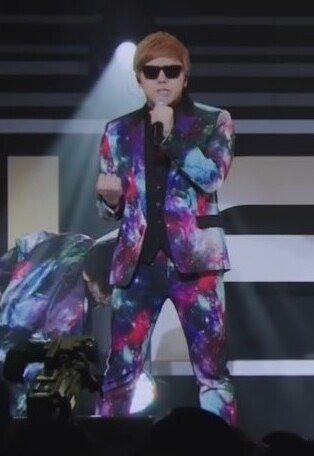
Hikakin at Uuum Fes in 2020

His channel kept growing, reaching nine million subscribers on April 8, 2021. Hikakin set 10 million subscribers as his next goal. When his "HikakinTV" channel reached its 10th anniversary, he announced he would post 10 videos with extra effort, from August 1 to 20. The 10th video is the music video for Hikakin & Seikin's song "Fire", produced to commemorate the anniversary. This is the first Hikakin & Seikin music video to be released on "HikakinTV" since "YouTube Theme Song" in 2015. Hikakin changed his intro animation to one in which he encourages himself to reach his goal and celebrates HikakinTV's 10th anniversary.

At 12:11 on September 10, 2021, his YouTube channel "HikakinTV" surpassed 10 million subscribers. The same day, he made a live broadcast and cried at the moment he reached the milestone. In September 17 of the same year, Hikakin announced he would donate 10 yen (about US$0.06) for every additional subscriber for the rest of his life. For every additional million subscribers, he would donate 10 million yen (about US$64,000), saying: "I am able to earn money thanks to all of you who watch my videos. That's why I wanted to contribute to society, even if just a little."

On December 18, 2021, Hikakin launched an iPhone 13 giveaway campaign on X (formerly Twitter). Participants were required to follow his official account and retweet the relevant post; 103 iPhone 13 units, valued at 10 million yen, were offered as prizes. The post garnered over 1.75 million retweets. In a video uploaded on December 21, Hikakin noted this figure surpassed the 1.087 million retweets achieved by an anti-racism post from BTS using the hashtag "#StopAsianHate". According to data released by Twitter Japan on December 10, BTS's post previously held the record for the most retweets globally in 2021. Ultimately, this tweet reached 1.8 million retweets, becoming the eighth-most-retweeted tweet.

On August 7, 2022, Hikakin released a video of a large-scale project in which he rented out Fuji-Q Highland, titled "Catch the Popular One! Hikakin Tag 2022 Summer" (人気者を捕まえろ! ヒカキンおにごっこ 2022夏). This video is a tag project he planned and held with 130 million yen (about US$910,000) as a "dream video that he really wanted to shoot" after his channel surpassed 10 million subscribers. After ist release on YouTube, it set a record by ranking first overall on YouTube's trending rankings, receiving 280,000 simultaneous viewers and exceeding five million views in one day after its release.

On August 16, 2022, his channel "HikakinTV" reached 10 billion total views. On December 6, he was ranked first in the "Top Trending Videos of the Year in Japan" officially announced by YouTube. This marked the third-consecutive year in which he was ranked first in the "Top Trending Videos of the Year in Japan". He also ranked ninth in the gaming category.

In early 2023, he posted a video of his first visit in 20 years to his alma mater , Myōkōkōgen Minami Elementary School, which was scheduled to close due to its integration with Myōkōkōgen Elementary School. At the request of the principal, he was accompanied by his older brother Seikin, who also graduated from the school, and his childhood friend and classmate YouTuber Masuo, who accompanied Hikakin as surprise guests; they created a commemorative painting and sang the school song with the students.

=== 2024–present: Increasing subscribers and starting streaming on Twitch ===
On March 22, 2024, Japan's Ministry of Education, Culture, Sports, Science and Technology announced the results of the textbook screening process, saying Hikakin is featured in a moral education textbook published by Tokyo Shoseki for the 2025 academic year. Around April 2024, Hikakin posted a popular short "counter video" celebrating the moment his channel reached a certain number of subscribers. More people subscribed, increasing by a million in the week from April 28 to May 4. In May 2024, his subscriber base increased by 4.08 million, and he commented: "I made counter short videos popular and ushered in a new era for YouTube".

In May 2024, Hikakin posted a video recreating the opening movie for the second season of the television anime series Mashle: Magic and Muscles, which uses the Japanese hip-hop duo Creepy Nuts' song "Bling-Bang-Bang-Born" as its opening theme. The video features the character he plays. Production cost about 50 million yen (about US$35,000), and it was shot in 70 hours over four days. During the four days of filming, he averaged two to three hours of sleep per day. He said he slept for only ten hours and played more than 30 characters, making it a "tough shoot". Fans praised the video, which was viewed 10 million times within a day of its release, making it Hikakin's most-viewed video of 2024.

On December 22, 2024, Hikakin opened a channel on the American live-streaming platform Twitch. On the 24th, he held his first broadcast, playing Minecraft for 12 hours. He gained 76,000 Twitch followers in December, becoming the Japanese Twitch streamer who gained the most followers that month. After that, on January 17, 2025, he announced that he had opened a channel called "HikakinClipTV" on YouTube to post clips of his Twitch live-streaming. In a YouTube video, he said he created this channel because his clip videos were popular on social media, and that "you can see a Hikakin for adults". This was the first channel he opened since "HikakinGames" in 2013.

On January 24, 2025, Hikakin's sub-channel "SmaDigiTV" was discovered by X (formerly Twitter) user "Hikakin_Finder". He opened this channel in March 2013, and only one game app review was posted in May of the same year. At the time of posting, the video had been viewed about 4,000 times and had 54 subscribers, but due to its popularity, as of January 25, 2025, it had been viewed 28,000 times and had 3,000 subscribers. In 2025, Hikakin and several other creators affiliated with Uuum commented on popular, trending titles on Google Play. In September, he appeared alongside fellow YouTuber Hajime Syacho at a promotional event for Asahi Breweries' "Mirai no Lemon Sour" (Future Lemon Sour), held at LaLa arena Tokyo-Bay in Funabashi, Chiba Prefecture. The event involved attempts to set two Guinness World Records; "Most people opening drink cans simultaneously" and "Most people toasting online and in a single venue simultaneously". They set both records, with 2,747 participants for the former and 2,806 for the latter. The record for the former was broken in Hoover, United States, in July 2026.

Around 3:00 PM on November 19, 2026, he posted on X, announcing that the subscriber count for his YouTube channel, "HikakinTV", was nearing 20 million, and that he would hold a live stream from Miami, United States, starting at 6:00 PM (Japan Standard Time) that same day. As planned, he began the live stream at 6:00 PM from his hotel in Miami. Then, around 8:00 PM—approximately two hours after the stream began—he reached the 20-million-subscriber milestone.

== YouTube content ==
Hikakin has opened seven channels on YouTube, and as of November 2026, the inclusive number of subscribers is approximately 30.7 million, with approximately 26.7 billion views. Additionally, his main YouTube channel, "HikakinTV" has over 20 million subscribers as of November 2026, making it the 8th most-subscribed YouTube channel in Japan. His video greeting, "Bzz bzz, hello YouTube, I'm Hikakin", contains a nod to the American beatboxer Rahzel. Hikakin said his fan base consists mainly of elementary and junior high school students, and he wants to create family-friendly content. The name Hikakin was given to him by his senior ski jumper, who started calling him Hikakin, a twist on his real name. He asked his senior the reason for the suffix "Kin", but this was never revealed. When he was in junior high school, he began posting beatboxing clips on bulletin boards under the name Hikakin, and the name gradually spread, so it stuck.

=== Style ===
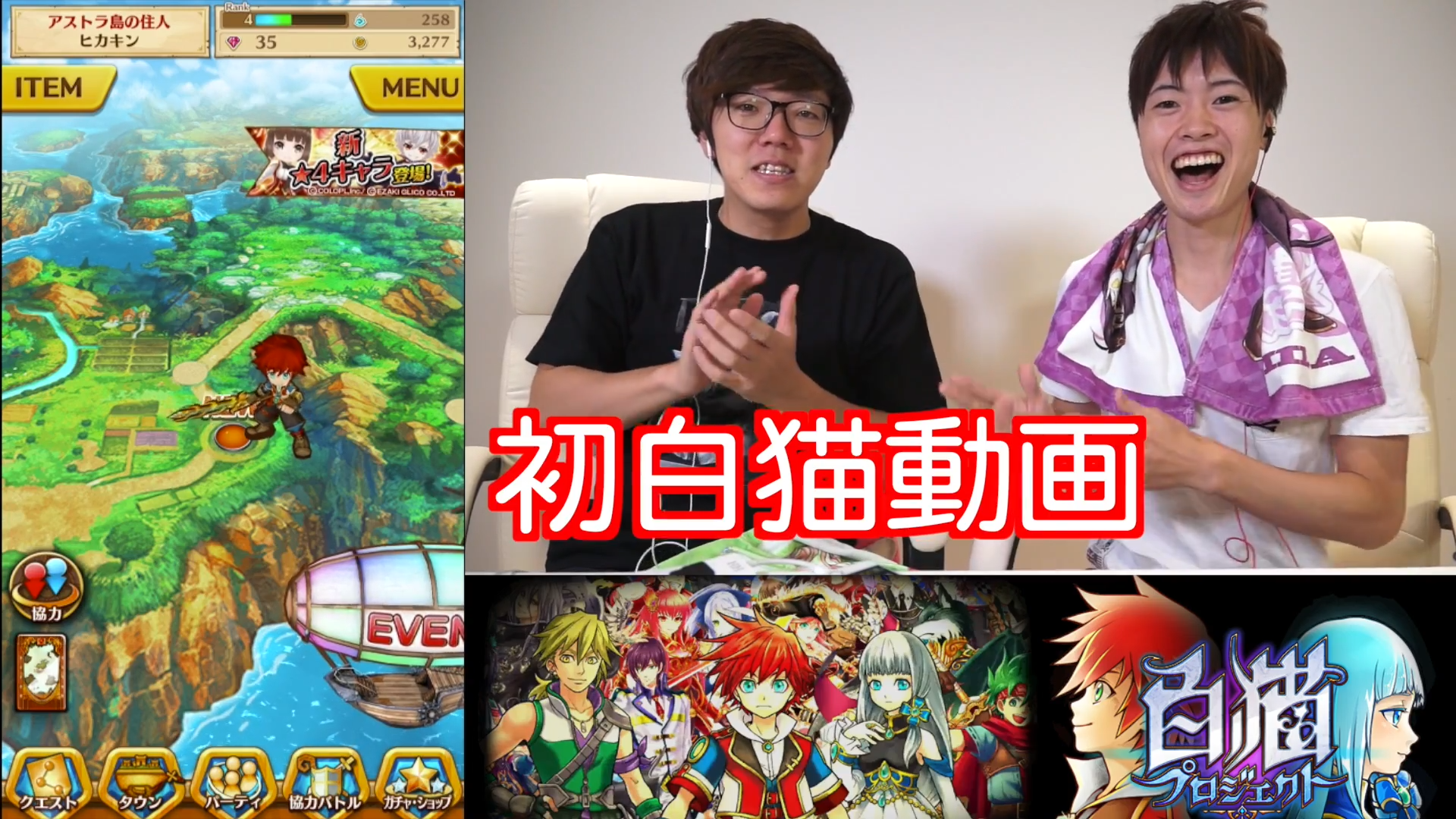
An example of Hikakin's YouTube content

Early in his career, Hikakin posted mostly beatboxing videos, for which he was best known. In 2011, he began posting product review videos on his channel, HikakinTV, and later expanded into other genres. As of 2026, his current videos are aimed primarily at people in their teens and twenties, and are described as "clean". The Japanese magazine Aera noted: "everything—from the sound effects, production style, and tone of voice to the timing of scene transitions—is meticulously crafted to capture the hearts of elementary school students". Spencer Cohen of The Japan Times described his videos as "simple and formulaic", noting they are tailored to the short attention spans of children growing up in an era saturated with screens and content. Naoya Osato of Japanese entertainment news website Real Sound compared his past and present videos, noting that, beyond the improvement in quality, there is now a deliberate, thorough focus on compliance and ensuring the content does not offend anyone; as a result, his videos are deemed suitable for children and have garnered support from fans across generations. Japanese political sociologist Shinnosuke Horiuchi analyzed his work, noting the "skillful" use of sound effects and visual effects, and that the strategic use of sound for different scenes makes the content aurally clear and easy to follow.

As his channel has grown, his content has become more diverse, and in addition to traditional beatboxing videos, his content now includes vlogs, DIY, gadget introductions, travel, and food. His videos from 2011 are simple and feature almost no editing, but in 2012, he added an opening sequence to the videos, and the icons became more colorful. Around 2017, he began to emphasize content "families can enjoy together in the living room", and uploaded more family-friendly content. Since 2020, Hikakin's video production system has included greater creative planning and editing resources, resulting in more sophisticated visual presentation and large-scale collaborative projects.

Hikakin's early beatboxing videos are around one minute long, but from about 2011, they lengthened to three to six minutes. In a 2015 conversation with Japanese entrepreneur Takafumi Horie, Hikakin said he aimed to create short videos lasting about three minutes, and that he anticipated children would watch long-form content like game commentary after returning home and factored this into his upload timing. From 2020, his videos began to exceed one hour; Kenta Terunuma of Shueisha Online analyzed this shift, noting YouTube's algorithm had begun prioritizing "watch time" over "view count", and that Hikakin had adapted his strategy accordingly.

=== Production and output ===
Hikakin uses Final Cut Pro to edit his videos, focusing on keeping them short and fast-paced. He usually works at home but sometimes films in a studio. Early in his YouTube career, Hikakin said he did not hire editors or outside assistants to help him produce videos, and worked for years without sufficient sleep. He now hires an editor for his videos and edits with a team. In a 2022 interview, he said: "Compared to when I was doing it alone, working with a team is hard because it requires different skills."

In the early part of his career, Hikakin would sometimes post two or three videos a day. Between 2012 and 2015, he posted more than 800 long -form videos a year. Around 2018, he took six hours to edit a seven-minute video. As a result, videos titled "Fatigue Kin Collection", (疲労キン集) which were collections of strange statements he made due to fatigue, began to spread on social media, and in a video from May 2024, he said: "Around this time, I was taken away in an ambulance once. I was working without sleep, and once. I had some terrible hives all over my body, so I had to be taken away, around this time." In an interview, he said: "What you need to become popular on YouTube is frequency and consistency in posting".

In an interview with BuzzFeed Japan, Hikakin described being a YouTuber as "hard work", saying: "You come up with the material, perform it, edit it, upload it, and then think about the next day's material. You might think, 'I'm just filming at home with a small video camera,' but when you do that 365 days a year, especially for two or three years, it really starts to wear on you ... I think being a YouTuber requires a lot of patience."

== Business interests ==
On April 21, 2023, the day of his 34th birthday, Hikakin announced on his channel "HikakinTV" he would suspend all activities, including social media, for a week. The break was in preparation for the launch of Hikakin Premium. On April 27 of the same year, he announced the brand's launch.

=== Misokin ===
"Misokin" (みそきん) is a series of instant noodle and instant rice products produced by Hikakin and manufactured and sold by Nissin Food Products. Since its launch in May 2023, it has become a social phenomenon, selling out immediately upon every release. By 2026, cumulative shipments had surpassed 60 million units. The product lineup includes "Misokin Rich Miso Ramen" (みそきん 濃厚味噌ラーメン) and "Misokin Rich Miso Meshi" (みそきん 濃厚味噌メシ). The brand operates physical ramen stores that require advance reservations.

On May 9, 2023, Hikakin Premium launched its first products, a cup ramen called "Misokin Rich Miso Ramen" (みそきん 濃厚味噌ラーメン) and a cup rice called "Misokin Rich Miso Meshi" (みそきん 濃厚味噌メシ), which garnered attention on social media. The products were manufactured by Nissin Food Products Co., Ltd. and sold though Seven-Eleven stores throughout Japan.

"Misokin Rich Miso Ramen" (right) and "Misokin Rich Miso Meshi" (left)

On May 18, 2025, Hikakin posted a video announcing "New Misokin" (新みそきん) would go on sale at Seven-Eleven stores across Japan on May 24. The "New Misokin" line consists of "Ramen" and "Meshi" (rice), which contain meat, which was not included in the original versions. On October 25, 2025, he launched a new product called "Spicy Misokin" (辛みそきん).

On July 12, 2026, Hikakin posted a video announcing the launch of new products: "Curry Misokin" (カレーみそきん) and "Curry Misokin Meshi" (カレーみそきんメシ). These went on sale at Seven-Eleven stores across Japan on July 26.

==== Reception ====
"Misokin" products sold out on the first day of release, and words related to "Misokin" trended on X (formerly Twitter), and posters apologizing for the lack of stocks were displayed in stores. Hikakin was so influential they released a video on the day of the release. There were also reports of high-value resale on Mercari.

On May 29, 2023, Hikakin uploaded a video announcing stocks of the products would be replenished. Restock was scheduled to be around the middle of August 2023, and limited quantities were sequentially released at Seven-Eleven on August 10. Some stores restricted purchases. In the following year, 2024, it was resold on May 25 and 30th.

On November 24, 2024, he announced on X (formerly Twitter) cumulative sales of "Misokin Rich Miso Ramen" and "Misokin Rich Miso Rice" had exceeded 10 million meals. As of July 12, 2026, this product has sold over 60 million meals.

On April 21, 2026, an X user posted a photo showing dark brown granules inside a single yellow noodle from a "Spicy Misokin Rich Spicy Miso Ramen" (辛みそきん 濃厚辛味噌ラーメン) product. Nissin Foods investigated the matter and discovered fragments of an adult cigarette beetle. The X user received three cups of instant noodles as an apology, stating: "It was disappointing that the way they handled the situation was so sloppy". This response drew a flood of criticism online. Nissin Foods stated: "We take this matter very seriously; we will re-examine and strictly enforce hygiene and quality control measures at our factories, review our system for handling customer inquiries, and strive to prevent a recurrence".

=== Onicha ===
Onicha packaging

On March 28, 2026, a livestream on his main channel "HikakinTV" showed a black screen accompanied by the sound of waves. The following day, he posted on X: "I might not be able to post on social media for a while. Please don't worry; it's not due to any trouble", though he did not reveal specific details. The stream continued, and on March 30, the stream showed footage of the ocean. On March 31, he uploaded a one-minute video announcing an announcement would be made on April 5. On April 5, he uploaded a video announcing "Onicha" would go on sale at Seven-Eleven stores starting April 21.

Onicha (鬼茶) is a barley tea beverage that is manufactured by Cheerio and is marketed with the concept of "adding a fun, exciting experience to barley tea—an everyday drink", stemming from Hikakin becoming a father and paying greater attention to children's health. It is made using only barley.

Immediately after its release, the product trended on X and sold out across Japan. Sales resumed in stages starting on April 25, 2026. Reactions have been mixed; some critics have praised the taste as "refreshing and easy to drink", others have noted that although they had high expectations, it is ordinary barley tea. On April 25, Hikakin posted a video announcing shipments of Onicha had surpassed seven million bottles. On June 9 of the same year, HuffPost Japan reported sales had exceeded 7.5 million bottles.

=== Physical stores ===
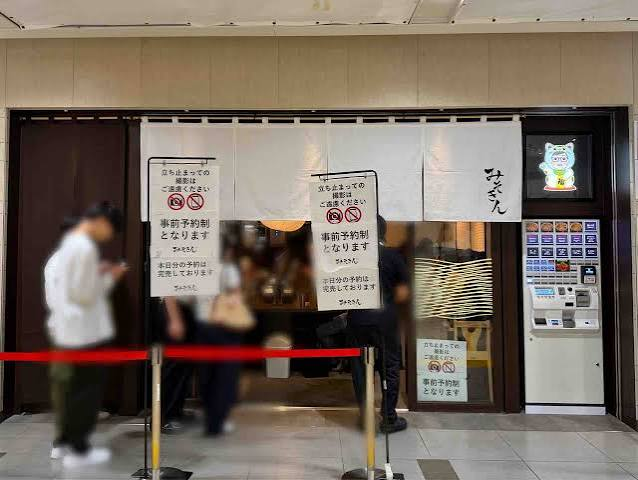
The first physical Misokin store at Ramen Street

On August 3, 2025, Hikakin announced on his YouTube channel "HikakinTV" he would open a Misokin store on Ramen Street, in Tokyo Station, on August 7. The store was scheduled to be open until February 23, 2026. It was also announced reservations would be required to reduce congestion. The menu consistes of four types of ramen: "Misokin" (みそきん), "Ajitama Misokin" (味玉みそきん), "Char Siu Misokin" (チャーシューみそきん), and "Special Misokin" (特製みそきん). The soup is made with white miso from Niigata Prefecture, blended with pork bones and chicken bones, and the noodles would be made with Japanese wheat. He posted a video on August 4 saying the first 8,000 reservations were filled the moment they were made available. This store closed on February 23, 2026, as scheduled.

On March 1, 2026, Hikakin posted a video on his YouTube channel announcing that a second physical store would open in Ikebukuro on March 8. He also revealed plans to open a third store in Osaka around the summer of the same year. Regarding the Osaka location, he explained that construction was taking time due to the store's "considerably large" size. In addition, he also announced a new menu item, "Spicy Misokin" (辛みそきん).

On July 26, 2026, he posted a video announcing the opening of a physical Misokin store in Osaka, which was teased in an earlier video, at Abeno Cues Mall commercial complex. It opened on August 1 of the same year, and 800 people selected by lottery were invited to the opening ceremony, where Hikakin performed the ribbon-cutting.

=== Company rename ===
In April 2026, Hikakin, Uuum co-founder Kazuki Kamada, and former Google employee Hikaru Yamamoto established a company called Bee (stylized in all caps). This company operates the brand of the same name associated with Hikakin. It was originally known as "Hikakin Premium" and was managed by P2C Studio, a Uuum subsidiary, as a joint venture between Hikakin and Uuum. Coinciding with the April 2026 launch of the barley tea product "Onicha", the brand was renamed "Bee" and an eponymous company was established.

== Public image and influence ==
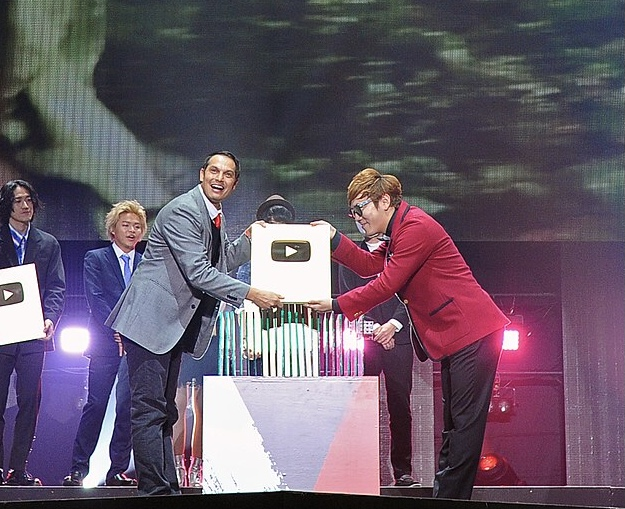
Hikakin at the YouTube Japan 2019 FanFest

Since his breakthrough with his beatboxing videos on YouTube, Hikakin has become one of the most-influential and prominent online personalities in Japan, through his popularity on YouTube and extensive media coverage. Media have portrayed him as a pioneer of YouTube in Japan. He has been featured in various publications as Japan's "Top YouTuber". Forbes Japan stated: "Hikakin has pioneered the possibilities of video posting in Japan as a 'front runner'. The products and goods he introduces sell like hotcakes, and he has the power to move the economy".

As of 2026, Hikakin has not been involved in any major scandals, and social trust is extremely high. Most of his videos are moderate; he is also known as "unfamiliar with controversy" (炎上知らず), and when scandals involving other popular YouTubers occurred, his reputation improves and he is even called a "saint". Even if he did get stir controversy, most of it was minor, and on the contrary, the voices of his defense were louder. In 2015 and 2020, viewers spread false rumors, and he posted two videos to clarify misunderstandings.

In a live commentary video of Apex Legends that was uploaded on July 12, 2022, he repeatedly yelled abusive words at his teammate, and in the comments section, he exposed the player's name and said: "If you find him annoying, please press the like button." As a result of the post, he was criticized on social media. On July 19, he deleted the comment and apologized in the comments section. On August 13, he directly addressed the person in a video to apologize and reported they had reconciled. He expected the video's comment section would be filled with criticism of the other party, but Hikakin himself was criticized, and he apologized and accepted responsibility. In June 2024, he included a video recorded in a public restroom, which drew criticism.

According to Noko, the frontman of Japanese rock band Shinsei Kamattechan, who is an old friend, described Hikakin's personality: "There is not another person who is this open-minded". He described Hikakin as kind to everyone, and as someone who does not care about profit or loss. He said Hikakin is a person who can take action. According to Noko: "The first time I met him was at a party hosted by Japanese entrepreneur Takafumi Horie in 2013, and when he told me that his goal at the time was that he wanted to exceed the number of subscribers on a corporate channel. Normally, if I were to see him as a rival, I wouldn't have to be an individual. It's amazing that the other party was a company".

Hiroyuki Nishimura, the founder of 2channel, said during a 2021 banquet scandal involving multiple YouTubers: "I've been saying from time to time that 'personality' is what is needed to do well on YouTube in the long term, but it is important to properly handle situations like this. It's amazing how Hikakin is avoiding scandals ..." Takafumi Horie described Hikakin as "an ordinary person", and said: "There aren't many people who are popular on the internet who aren't very pushy, and even though they weren't really outstanding during their school days, they're just average people. So it's just as I expected".

== Philanthropy ==
In 2014, hHikakin donated 597,840 yen (about $3,800) collected at a charity handshake event, and 1.4 million yen (about $8,900) of his own, to areas affected by the Great East Japan Earthquake.

In 2018, through the Central Community Chest of Japan, he donated one million yen (about $6,300) to areas affected by the 2018 Japan floods. In 2019, he donated one million yen to the Typhoon Hagibis disaster area. On January, 2020, in response to the Black Summer bushfires in Australia, he donated $15,000 to the Australian Red Cross and $15,000 to Port Macquarie Koala Hospital.

On May 21, 2020, to prevent the spread of SARS-CoV-2, he established the "Coronavirus Medical Support Fund" in partnership with Yahoo! Japan. At the event, he donated 100 million yen (about $690,000). Celebrities also contributed, including Japanese businessman Yusaku Maezawa, and soccer player Yuto Nagatomo, Hikakin said he would donate all proceeds from YouTube videos he posted during the fundraising period. From May 21 to June 30, 216,295 people donated, bringing the total to about 370 million yen (about $2.55 million).

In 2021, he donated 5 million yen (about $31,000) worth of Super Chats to "Support for Preventing COVID-19 Medical Collapse (Yahoo! Fund)" after it failed to reach 10 million subscribers. He also donated 10 million yen of his own (about $63,000).

In March 2022, 11 years after the Great East Japan Earthquake, sales of the Line stamp "3.11 Things I can do in the future" sold by Yahoo! Japan and Line as part of a joint project to support the reconstruction of areas affected by the earthquake, and to raise awareness of disaster prevention, reached 121,032,20 yen (about $77,000), all of which was donated to prevent the disaster from fading and to support future generations.

In December 2022, the organization donated five million yen each to the National Children's Cafeteria Support Center Musubie, an accredited non-profit organization, and the Singlemothers forum. In 2023, he donated one million yen to the relief effort following the 2023 Turkey–Syria earthquakes. In 2024, he donated 10 million yen each to the areas affected by the 2024 Noto earthquake and the Hualien earthquake.

On August 7, 2026, he posted a video on his YouTube channel announcing a 20-million-yen (about $126,740) donation to the areas affected by the 2026 Kumamoto earthquake. The donation consisted of 10 million yen from his company, Bee, and another 10 million yen from his personal funds. He also announced the provision of approximately 14,000 bottles of "Onicha" barley tea, a product sold by Bee.

== Personal life ==
In July 2018, Hikakin adopted a male Scottish Fold cat named Maruo (まるお), and in September, he adopted Maruo's brother, Mofuko (もふこ). He has liked cats since he was a child and had been thinking about getting one for a year.

On August 1, 2023, a video was released of his new two-billion-yen ($13 million) rental home. This is Hikakin's first house, which has an indoor heated pool and a 71-tatami living room (115 m^{2} (1,240 sq ft)). He said this is his second base, leaving his previous home behind.

On January 1, 2024, Hikakin announced his marriage on his channel. On August 1 of the same year, he announced the birth of his first child. He said his wife was pregnant when he announced his marriage announcement in January, but he refrained from announcing the pregnancy at the time because he felt it would be a burden to his wife, both mentally and physically.

On January 19, 2025, he announced in a video that he had been diagnosed with eosinophilic sinusitis, a designated intractable disease, and had undergone surgery. The video showed his hospitalization, surgery, and post-discharge episodes. On June 28, 2026, he announced on his YouTube channel he had moved house for the first time in eight years, and showed his new home. He also announced the house he had rented in 2023 for two billion yen would be used for filming purposes.

On August 9, 2026, on his YouTube channel, he announced his second child had been born. He said while the pregnancy had been confirmed in January of that year, and the birth had occurred in July, he had waited to release the video until "some time had passed since the delivery and both mother and child were healthy and stable".

== Filmography ==
=== Film ===
Year	Title	Role	Ref.
2015	Ju-On: The Final Curse	Waiter (ファミレス店員, Famiresu Ten'in)	
2016	Hentai Kamen: Abnormal Crisis	Tamao's subordinate (玉男の手下, Tamao no Teshita)	
2017	Ajin: Demi-Human	Himself	
2021	The Great Yokai War: Guardians	Hikakin (ひかきん, Yōtuber Hikakin)	
2024	Run for money The Movie:Tokyo Mission	Himself	
2024	Bakuage Sentai Boonboomger GekijoBoon! Promise the Circuit	Himself	
2025	Exit 8	Himself	

=== Television ===
Year	Title	Role	Notes	Ref.
2019	GeGeGe no Kitarō	Himself	Voice; episode 53	
2019	Doctor-X: Surgeon Michiko Daimon	Patient	Season 6; episode 5	
2019	Downtown Now	Guest		
2019	I Met That Shocking Person!	Guest		
2020	Matsuko Kaigi	Guest		
2022	I Will Be Your Bloom	8LOOMY	Episode 5	
2023	Dareka to Nakai	Guest		
2023	Sunday's First-Time Learnings	Guest		
2024	Are You Smarter than a 5th Grader?	Guest		
2026	Golden SixTones	Guest		

=== Dub ===
Year	Title	Role	Ref.
2018	Ralph Breaks the Internet	Buzzchew Bee, Stormtrooper	
2019	Toy Story 4	Eagle Toy	
2025	A Minecraft Movie	Nitwit	

=== Video games ===
Year	Title	Role	Ref.
2024	Platform 8	Abnormality	
2025	Inazuma Eleven: Victory Road	Teru Makushita	

=== Music videos ===
Year	Title	Artist(s)	Role	Ref.
2017	"On My Way"	Tiësto featuring Bright Sparks	Himself	
2025	"Moshimonogatari"	Tani Yuuki	Himself	

== Accolades ==
Year	Ceremony	Category	Result	Ref.
2020	10th Streamy Awards	International	Nominated	
2022	12th Streamy Awards	International	Nominated	

== Publications ==
=== Single author ===
- My work is YouTube (僕の仕事はYouTube, Boku no shigoto wa YouTube) (July 19, 2013, Housewife and Lifesha) ISBN 978-4391143799
- How to make a YouTuber loved by 4 million people (400万人に愛されるYouTuberのつくり方, 400mannin ni aisareru YouTuber no tsukurikata) (October 30, 2014, Nikkei BP) ISBN 978-4822220792
