= Fischer's =

Japanese YouTuber group

- Occupation: YouTuber

YouTube information
- Channels: Fischer's; Fischer's-Secondary-
- Years active: 2010-present
- Genre: Comedy
- Subscribers: 8.76 million (Fischer's); 2.83 million (Fischer's-Secondary-)
- Views: 19.6 billion (Fischer's); 2.16 billion (Fischer's-Secondary-)
- Last updated: March 28, 2025
- Website: Fischer's; Fischer's - UUUM

Fischer's (Japanese: フィッシャーズ, Fisshāzu) are a Japanese YouTuber group belonging to the multi-channel network UUUM consisting of 6 members: Silk Road, Masai, Ndaho, Motoki, Zakao and Dāma. As of February 2022, Fischer's was the most-viewed YouTube channel in Japan with 13.4 billion views, and the 7th most-subscribed channel in Japan with 7.23 million subscribers.

== Overview ==
The group is based in Katsushika, Tokyo, and was formed in 2010 by eight classmates of the same junior high school. As their first video was of the members playing in a river like fish, their channel was named "Fischer's". Video themes mainly involve scripted skits and comedy, but the group also post vlogs and athletic videos.

Fischer's have gained popularity especially in the younger generations becoming the most-viewed YouTube channel in Japan in 2019. In the recent years, they have started to appear on television and other media outside YouTube. In the meantime, their YouTube videos have often been the subject of criticism both from viewers as well as other YouTubers.

== History ==
Fischer's was formed on February 25, 2010. In October 2015, Daibū left the group stating that he "was unreliable as a friend" and "broke a rule within the members", leaving the group with seven members.

On April 27, 2018, the group made their first appearance on TV Asahi's music program Music Station performing their song Niji. Since 2018, the group has participated in Momoiro Uta Gassen on New Year's Eve, airing on BS Nippon Television, Fuji TV NEXT, Nippon Broadcasting System, etc.

In 2019, Fischer's collaborated with the One Piece series in a manga spin-off series Fischer's×ONE PIECE 7-tsunagi no dai hihō, with its first volume being released on July 4. Fischer's voice acted their own roles in the movie One Piece: Stampede released on August 9 commemorating the 20th anniversary of the original anime series. The same month, the group participated in ROCK IN JAPAN FESTIVAL.

On September 16, 2019, Fischer's set the Guinness world record for the largest game of tag with 10,908 participants at Expo Commemoration Park in Suita, Osaka Prefecture. The same month, the cumulative number of views on the channel became number one in Japan, and in December, Fischer's became the 9th most watched YouTuber in the world in 2019 with 1.9 billion views, appearing in YouTube Rewind 2019: For the Record. On December 13, Fischer's was awarded the Streamy Award in the International Asia-Pacific Region becoming the first Japanese YouTuber to receive the Streamy Award.

In late 2020, multiple women accused Fischer's member Peketan of extorting sex and money. This resulted in Fischer's coming under fire from the public, ultimately forcing Peketan to leave the group, thus leaving Fischer's with six active members appearing in the videos. Fischer's announced that he would be in charge of video editing after "an inappropriate relationship with a female fan". The group received further widespread criticism as viewers considered their announcement video to disregard the seriousness of the issue.

On January 11, 2021, Fischer's posted their third 100-minute tag video. Among the participants were Erick Wainaina, Tenshin Nasukawa, Daisuke Naito, Hollywood Zakoshisyoh, and Mahoto Watanabe. On April 3, Fischer's opened an athletic park "Greenia" at Mount Rokko.

== Members ==
=== Current members ===
Name	Date of birth	Member Color	Role
Silk Road	August 19, 1994	Red	Leader Rap
Masai	January 12, 1995	Blue	Deputy leader Chorus
Ndaho	August 4, 1994	Yellow	Vocals
Motoki	September 3, 1994	Pink	Chorus
Zakao	June 3, 1994	Black	Dancer
Dāma	February 25, 1995	Purple	Chorus

=== Former members ===
Name	Date of birth	Member Color	Role
Daibū	February 26, 1995	Orange	Former deputy leader
Peketan	February 2, 1995	Green	Vocals
