= List of YouTube Premium original programming =

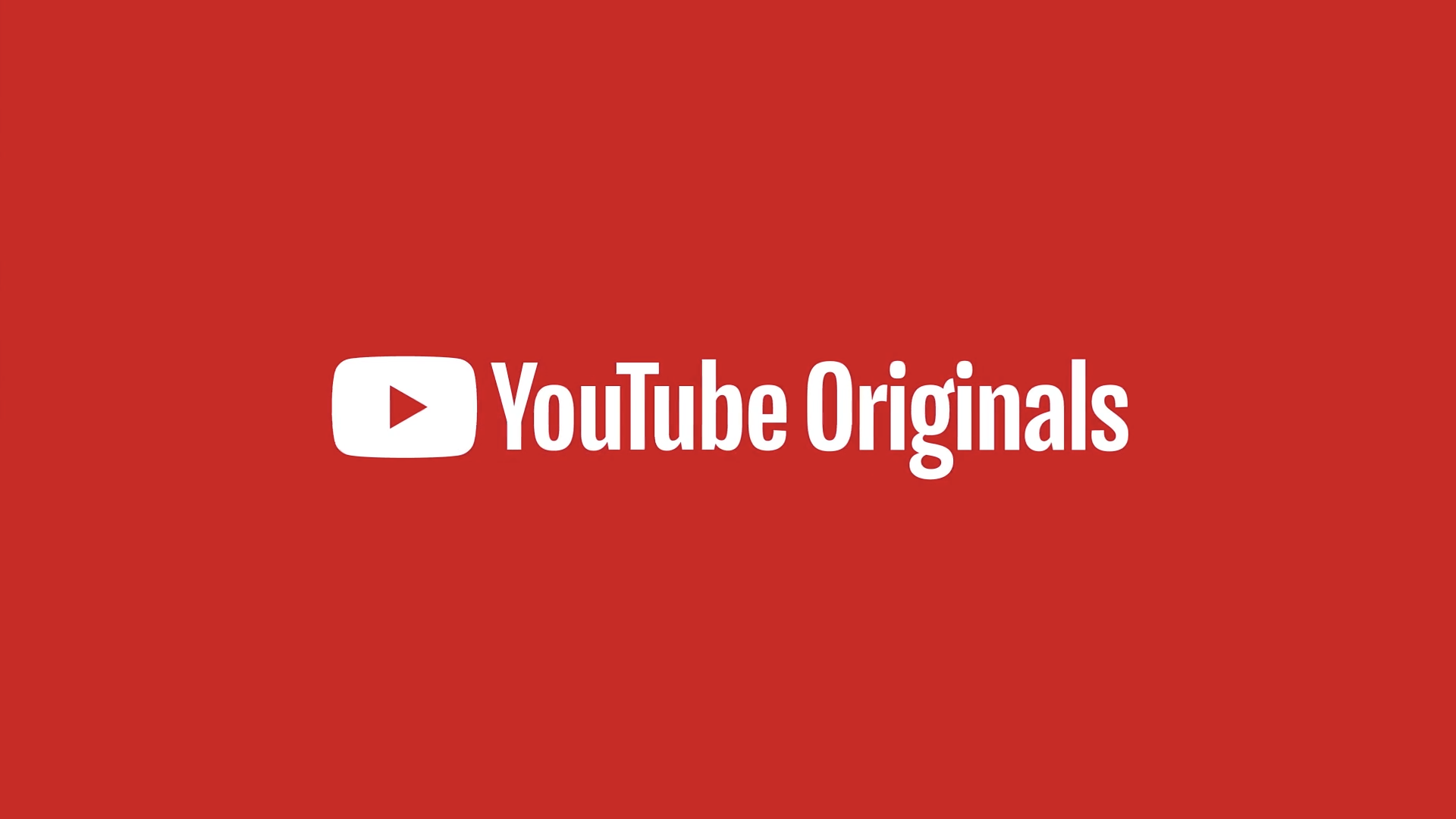
Title screen of YouTube Originals

YouTube Premium (formerly Music Key and YouTube Red) is a subscription service that provides advertising-free streaming of all videos hosted by YouTube, offline play and background playback of videos on mobile devices, access to advertising-free music streaming through YouTube Music, and access to YouTube Original series and films. In January 2022, YouTube announced it was shutting down its YouTube Originals program. Following is a list of all past YouTube Original scripted and unscripted series, feature-length films and documentaries.

== Original programming ==
=== Drama ===
Title	Genre	Premiere	Seasons	Length	Notes
Lifeline	Science fiction	October 11, 2017	1 season, 8 episodes	22–26 min	
Step Up: High Water	Teen drama	January 31, 2018	2 seasons, 20 episodes	41–57 min	(Note: Moved to Starz for season 3.)
Impulse	Science fiction	June 6, 2018	2 seasons, 20 episodes	44–51 min	
Origin	Science fiction	November 14, 2018	1 season, 10 episodes	41–60 min	

=== Comedy ===
Title	Genre	Premiere	Seasons	Length	Notes
Foursome	Comedy	March 30, 2016	4 seasons, 36 episodes	22 min	
Sing It!	Comedy	May 25, 2016	1 season, 10 episodes	21–26 min	
Bad Internet	Dark comedy	May 25, 2016	1 season, 10 episodes	12 min	
Single by 30	Romantic comedy	August 24, 2016	1 season, 8 episodes	24–25 min	
Broke	Comedy	September 28, 2016	1 season, 11 episodes	8–19 min	
Part Timers	Comedy	January 11, 2016	2 season, 20 episodes	10-15 min	
Rhett and Link's Buddy System	Comedy	October 19, 2016	2 seasons, 16 episodes	15–22 min	
12 Deadly Days	Horror comedy anthology	December 12, 2016	12 episodes	22–27 min	(Note: Miniseries)
Me and My Grandma	Comedy	March 22, 2017	1 season, 6 episodes	22 min	
Good Game	Comedy	August 30, 2017	1 season, 6 episodes	21–28 min	
Long Distance	Comedy	September 28, 2017	1 season, 1 episode	24 min	
Ryan Hansen Solves Crimes on Television	Mystery comedy	October 25, 2017	2 seasons, 16 episodes	21–33 min	
Do You Want to See a Dead Body?	Surreal comedy	November 17, 2017	1 season, 15 episodes	12–23 min	
I'm Poppy	Surreal comedy	January 25, 2018	1 season, 1 episode	23 min	
Youth & Consequences	Teen comedy drama	March 7, 2018	1 season, 8 episodes	26–34 min	
Cobra Kai	Action comedy drama	May 2, 2018	2 seasons, 20 episodes	22–36 min	(Note: Moved to Netflix for seasons 3–6.)
Liza on Demand	Comedy	June 27, 2018	3 seasons, 25 episodes	23–26 min	
Sideswiped	Romantic comedy	July 25, 2018	1 season, 8 episodes	22–26 min	
Champaign ILL	Comedy	December 12, 2018	1 season, 10 episodes	25–32 min	
Overthinking with Kat & June	Comedy	December 19, 2018	1 season, 6 episodes	21–23 min	
Wayne	Action comedy	January 16, 2019	1 season, 10 episodes	30–35 min	
Weird City	Science fiction comedy anthology	February 13, 2019	1 season, 6 episodes	18–28 min	

=== Animation ===
==== Adult animation ====
Title	Genre	Premiere	Seasons	Length	Notes
Paranormal Action Squad	Comedy	November 16, 2016	1 season, 8 episodes	11–13 min	
Dallas & Robo	Comedy	May 30, 2018	1 season, 8 episodes	22–26 min	

==== Anime ====
Title	Genre	Premiere	Seasons	Length	Notes
IDOLiSH7: Vibrato	Musical	January 17, 2019	1 season, 8 episodes	11–17 min	
Obsolete	Mecha	December 3, 2019	1 season, 12 episodes	12–13 min	

==== Kids & family ====
Title	Genre	Premiere	Seasons	Length	Notes
Kings of Atlantis	Animated action adventure	April 7, 2017	1 season, 13 episodes	11 min	
DanTDM Creates a Big Scene	Live-action animated	April 7, 2017	6 episodes	11 min	
Fruit Ninja: Frenzy Force	Action/comedy	May 5, 2017	1 season, 13 episodes	11 min	
Hyperlinked	Comedy	May 31, 2017	1 season, 10 episodes	22 min	
We Are Savvy	Docuseries	September 6, 2017	2 seasons, 33 episodes	22 min	
Sherwood	Science fiction adventure	March 6, 2019	1 season, 10 episodes	21 min	
Lockdown	Teen thriller	June 26, 2020	2 seasons, 16 episodes	12–14 min	
Kid Correspondent	News satire	October 23, 2020	3 seasons, 13 episodes	11–15 min	
Pinkfong Wonderstar	Children's animation	December 3, 2020	2 seasons, 26 episodes	11 min	
Super Sema	Children's animation	March 8, 2021	2 seasons, 32 episodes	4–11 min	(Note: Continued without the YouTube Kids fund.)
Break the Record	Reality	July 22, 2021	1 season, 4 episodes	15 min	
Growing with Lottie Dottie	Children's animation	September 18, 2021	1 season, 13 episodes	12 min	
The Workout Badges	Preschool	September 22, 2021	1 season, 13 episodes	8 min	
BookTube Jr	Educational docuseries	September 24, 2021	1 season, 8 episodes	8–11 min	
Onyx Family Dinner	Talk show	November 4, 2021	1 season, 8 episodes	18 min	
Tab Time	Preschool	December 1, 2021	2 seasons, 20 episodes	21–28 min	
Supa Strikas: Rookie Season	Animated sports comedy	December 3, 2021	12 episodes	21–22 min	
Coyote Peterson's Wild Field Trip	Nature docuseries	December 8, 2021	1 season, 6 episodes	20–22 min	
The Guava Juice Show	Animated fantasy comedy	December 30, 2021	2 seasons, 26 episodes	11 min	
Millie and Lou	Animated preschool	March 4, 2022	1 season, 15 episodes	11 min	
Corpse Talk	Animated comedy	May 13, 2022	1 season, 13 episodes	7 min	
The Big Tiny Food Face-Off	Reality competition	July 15, 2022	1 season, 6 episodes	20 min	
Maddie's Urban Jungles	Nature documentary	September 23, 2022	1 season, 1 episode	19 min	
The Eggventurers	Animated preschool	October 21, 2022	1 season, 13 episodes	7 min	
Behind the Beats	Music docuseries	November 18, 2022	1 season, 26 episodes	5 min	
Jam Van	Live-action animated musical comedy	January 19, 2023	1 season, 8 episodes	11 min	
Mindful Adventures of Unicorn Island	Animated educational television	September 12, 2023	1 season, 10 episodes	12 min	

=== Unscripted ===
==== Docuseries ====
Title	Subject	Premiere	Episodes	Length	Notes
F2 Finding Football	Sports/Travel	June 13, 2018	8 episodes	23–27 min	
Best Shot	Sports	July 18, 2018	8 episodes	22–51 min	
Lefloid vs the World	Travel	September 12, 2018	8 episodes	22 min	
Ariana Grande: Dangerous Woman Diaries	Concert	November 29, 2018	4 episodes	27–37 min	
Almost Ready	Pregnancy	July 17, 2019	6 episodes	9–14 min	
A Student's Guide to Your First Year of College	Education/Self-help	September 4, 2019	1 season, 10 episodes	2–9 min	
Glad You Asked	Science/Social justice	October 8, 2019	2 seasons, 15 episodes	14–22 min	
BookTube	Books	October 17, 2019	15 episodes	10–23 min	
Retro Tech	History/Technology	December 2, 2019	2 seasons, 12 episodes	22–26 min	
The Age of A.I.	Technology	December 18, 2019	8 episodes	60 min	
Justin Bieber: Seasons	Music	January 27, 2020	10 episodes	8–14 min	
Fundamental. Gender Justice. No Exceptions	Social justice	March 4, 2020	1 season, 5 episodes	16–17 min	
Creators for Change	Social justice	March 17, 2020	1 season, 4 episodes	59 min	
Money Talks	Financial literacy	April 13, 2020	1 season, 9 episodes	5–8 min	
The Secret Life of Lele Pons	Mental health	May 19, 2020	5 episodes	20–30 min	
Defying Gravity: The Untold Story of Women's Gymnastics	Sports	September 21, 2020	6 episodes	31–43 min	
Together We Rise: The Uncompromised Story of GRM Daily	Music	September 28, 2020	4 episodes	25–26 min	
Released	Music	October 1, 2020	1 season, 18 episodes	13–17 min	
How to Be: Behzinga	Fitness/Sports	October 19, 2020	3 episodes	21–22 min	
Resist	Incarceration	November 18, 2020	12 episodes	6–11 min	
Light Speed	Automotives/Technology	December 7, 2020	6 episodes	17–24 min	
30 Days With: Why Don't We	Music	December 9, 2020	4 episodes	12–16 min	
30 Days With: Ryan Garcia	Sports	December 16, 2020	4 episodes	16–18 min	
NikkieTutorials: Layers of Me	Cosmetics/Influencer	December 28, 2020	4 episodes	16–19 min	
Demi Lovato: Dancing with the Devil	Addiction/Music	March 23, 2021	4 episodes	21–22 min	
K-Pop Evolution	Music	March 31, 2021	7 episodes	23–25 min	
Strive	Sports	June 29, 2021	6 episodes	20–23 min	
30 Days With: Bretman Rock	Beauty/Cosmetics	June 30, 2021	4 episodes	13–19 min	
Ice Cold	Hip hop culture	July 8, 2021	4 episodes	13–18 min	
If I Could Tell You Just One Thing	Entrepreneurship	September 9, 2021	4 episodes	23 min	
Noted: Alicia Keys The Untold Stories	Music	September 30, 2021	4 episodes	15–20 min	
The Outsiders?	African American culture	October 4, 2021	6 episodes	24–25	
Seat at the Table	Climate change	October 25, 2021	11 episodes	22 min	
Travel Around the World	Travel	November 3, 2021	95 episodes	10–25 min	
Best Shape of My Life	Fitness	November 8, 2021	6 episodes	20–22 min	
Bear Witness, Take Action 3	African American culture	December 6, 2021	6 episodes	10–23 min	
Race Around Britain	Comedy/Travel	December 6, 2021	1 season, 4 episodes	25–30 min	
30 Days With: Anuel	Music	December 21, 2021	4 episodes	50 min	
The Mandela Project	Community outreach/Social justice	July 18, 2022	1 season, 5 episodes	14–16 min	
Supreme Models	Fashion	September 26, 2022	6 episodes	22–24 min	
Spectrum Global: Being Black In...	Discrimination/Travel	December 22, 2022	3 episodes	26 min	

==== Reality ====
Title	Genre	Premiere	Seasons	Length	Notes
Scare PewDiePie	Horror comedy	February 10, 2016	1 season, 10 episodes	14–23 min	
Prank Academy	Hidden camera reality	March 30, 2016	1 season, 18 episodes	9–13 min	
MatPat's Game Lab	Reality competition	June 8, 2016	1 season, 8 episodes	19–23 min	
Escape the Night	Murder mystery reality competition	June 22, 2016	4 seasons, 46 episodes	21–30 min	
Mind Field	Docu-reality	January 18, 2017	3 seasons, 25 episodes	20–40 min	
Squad Wars	Reality competition	January 26, 2017	1 season, 9 episodes	25 min	
Lace Up: The Ultimate Sneaker Challenge	Reality competition	September 13, 2017	1 season, 8 episodes	43–46 min	
Furze World Wonders	Reality	September 28, 2017	1 season, 10 episodes	20–21 min	
Best Cover Ever	Music competition	November 20, 2017	1 season, 9 episodes	27–31 min	
Roman Atwood's Day Dreams	Reality	November 22, 2017	1 season, 7 episodes	22–25 min	
Ultimate Expedition	Reality competition	January 17, 2018	1 season, 10 episodes	30 min	
The Super Slow Show	Reality	January 24, 2018	1 season, 59 episodes	1–9 min	
Kevin Hart: What the Fit	Comedy reality	March 15, 2018	3 seasons, 35 episodes	11–17 min	
Jack Whitehall: Training Days	Comedy reality	May 9, 2018	1 season, 20 episodes	2–28 min	
The Sidemen Show	Reality	June 18, 2018	1 season, 7 episodes	25–33 min	
Sugar	Reality	August 15, 2018	1 season, 8 episodes	9–18 min	
Will Smith: The Jump	Reality	September 25, 2018	1 season, 8 episodes	2–24 min	
ARRived	Music competition	November 7, 2018	1 season, 14 episodes	23–79 min	
Planet Slow Mo	Reality	January 23, 2019	1 season, 24 episodes	6–16 min	
Could You Survive the Movies?	Science reality	October 21, 2019	2 seasons, 12 episodes	13–30 min	
Instant Influencer	Beauty competition	April 24, 2020	2 seasons, 12 episodes	35–42 min	
Stay Home with Yungblud	Reality	April 27, 2020	1 season, 4 episodes	12–13 min	
Celebrity Substitute	Reality	May 7, 2020	1 season, 12 episodes	30 min	
Create Together	Docu-reality	May 18, 2020	2 seasons, 12 episodes	10 min	
Sleeping with Friends	Reality	May 20, 2020	1 season, 3 episodes	30 min	
The Great Gift Exchange	Reality	December 1, 2020	1 season, 12 episodes	13–17 min	
YIAY Time: The Game Show	Reality competition	January 5, 2021	1 season, 6 episodes	23 min	
How to Olympics	Docu-reality	July 14, 2021	1 season, 8 episodes	17–19 min	
#1 Chicken	Reality competition	September 22, 2021	1 season, 6 episodes	22 min	
Climate Games	Docu-reality	October 23, 2021	1 season, 2 episodes	4–9 min	
Shut It Off ASAP	Docu-reality	October 26, 2021	1 season, 6 episodes	19–27 min	
Hometown Showdown	Reality competition	November 18, 2021	1 season, 4 episodes	20–24 min	
Copy That	Reality competition	November 29, 2021	1 season, 5 episodes	19 min	
The Creator Games 3	Reality competition	December 16, 2021	1 season, 2 episodes	12 min	
Secret Saboteurs	Reality competition	March 14, 2022	1 season, 5 episodes	22 min	

==== Variety ====
Title	Genre	Premiere	Seasons	Length	Notes
The School of...	Talk show	October 8, 2019	1 season, 7 episodes	5–10 min	

=== Non-English language ===
These shows were created by YouTube and are spoken entirely or almost entirely in a non-English language.

==== French ====
Title	Genre	Premiere	Seasons	Length	Notes
Les Emmerdeurs	Comedy	September 19, 2018	1 season, 10 episodes	22–30 min	
Groom	Comedy	September 19, 2018	2 seasons, 20 episodes	20–26 min	

==== German ====
Title	Genre	Premiere	Seasons	Length	Notes
Bullsprit	Comedy	September 12, 2018	1 season, 7 episodes	18–36 min	
Neuland	Meta comedy variety show	September 12, 2018	1 season, 11 episodes	11–31 min	

==== Hindi ====
Title	Genre	Premiere	Seasons	Length	Notes
Cricket Diaries: Men of the Match	Talk show	June 12, 2019	1 season, 5 episodes	21–31 min	
Off the Page with Lage Raho Munna Bhai	Table read	October 2, 2019	1 season, 17 episodes	3–12 min	
Pretty Fit	Comedy reality	January 21, 2020	1 season, 6 episodes	20–24 min	
Dhindora	Comedy	October 14, 2021	1 season, 8 episodes	12–22 min	

==== Japanese ====
Title	Genre	Premiere	Seasons	Length	Notes
Re:Imagine	Comics/Music docuseries	December 11, 2018	7 episodes	5–11 min	
The Fake Show	Science fiction thriller	December 12, 2018	1 season, 11 episodes	11–21 min	
Re:SET	Technology docuseries	April 3, 2019	1 season, 7 episodes	5–8 min	
Fischer's and the Lost Treasure	Comedy docu-reality	April 24, 2019	10 episodes	13–21 min	
I Am Non	Film docuseries	October 2, 2019	11 episodes	21–73 min	
Gray Zone Agency, Inc	Mockumentary workplace comedy/Improv comedy	March 23, 2020	10 episodes	13–32 min	
30 Days With: Hanaodengan	Docuseries	December 3, 2020	4 episodes	13–14 min	
Record Crushers	Reality	July 22, 2021	1 season, 4 episodes	22–27 min	
Kemio's Social Club	Talk show	August 27, 2021	1 season, 5 episodes	25–32 min	
Fischer's Quest	Reality competition	December 14, 2021	1 season, 4 episodes	39–45 min	
Gray Zone Island	Mockumentary workplace comedy/Improv comedy	August 1, 2022	6 episodes	23–38 min	

==== Korean ====
Title	Genre	Premiere	Seasons	Length	Notes
Run, BIGBANG Scout!	Docu-reality	April 26, 2017	7 episodes	4–24 min	
BTS: Burn the Stage	Concert docuseries	March 28, 2018	8 episodes	21–26 min	
Top Management	Fantasy drama	October 31, 2018	1 season, 16 episodes	20–43 min	
Jay Park: Chosen1	Music docuseries	May 1, 2019	4 episodes	17–21 min	
Analog Trip	Travel docuseries	October 9, 2019	2 seasons, 20 episodes	21–28 min	
Twice: Seize the Light	Concert docuseries	April 29, 2020	9 episodes	14–22 min	
KCON TACT: All Access	Music docuseries	October 2, 2020	1 season, 14 episodes	9–19 min	

==== Portuguese ====
Title	Genre	Premiere	Seasons	Length	Notes
Whindersson: Próxima Parada	Travel docuseries	October 3, 2019	2 seasons, 16 episodes	25–35 min	
Vai Pra Cima, Fred	Sports docuseries	April 19, 2020	8 episodes	16–24 min	
Futuro Ex-Porta	Comedy reality competition	October 30, 2021	1 season, 8 episodes	19–25 min	

==== Spanish ====
Title	Genre	Premiere	Seasons	Length	Notes
Sobreviví	Comedy	October 3, 2018	1 season, 8 episodes	25–31 min	
Aislados: Un documental en cuarentena	Mental health/Public health docuseries	June 9, 2020	4 episodes	15–20 min	
Mortal Glitch	Comedy	September 2, 2020	1 season, 5 episodes	23–30 min	
Bravas	Drama	October 7, 2020	1 season, 8 episodes	21–34 min	

=== Continuations ===
Title	Genre	Prev. network(s)	Premiere	Seasons	Length	Language	Notes
Fight of the Living Dead (seasons 2–3)	Reality competition	Independent (via YouTube)	August 17, 2016	2 seasons, 15 episodes	21–38 min	English	
Breakfast with Champions (season 6)	Talk show	Independent (via YouTube)	April 24, 2019	1 season, 12 episodes	19–27 min	Hindi	(Note: Future seasons were released on YouTube under the Oaktree Sports channel.)
What the Duck with Vikram Sathaye (season 4)	Talk show	Viu	May 6, 2019	1 season, 8 episodes	21–27 min	Hindi	

== Original films ==
=== Drama ===
Title	Genre	Release date
The Thinning	Thriller	October 12, 2016
Snap	Drama	July 5, 2017
The Thinning: New World Order	Thriller	October 17, 2018
Stalking Vampire	Horror	December 12, 2018
Viper Club	Drama	January 23, 2019

=== Comedy ===
Title	Genre	Release date
Lazer Team	Science fiction	January 27, 2016
Dance Camp	Dance	February 10, 2016
We Love You	Romance	November 22, 2016
Jingle Ballin'	Comedy	December 6, 2016
Ghostmates	Comedy	December 14, 2016
The Keys of Christmas	Comedy	December 19, 2016
Alexander IRL	Comedy	January 11, 2017
Reggae Shark Adventures	Comedy	August 12, 2017
Lazer Team 2	Science fiction	November 22, 2017
A Heist With Markiplier	Interactive	October 30, 2019
Signals	Anthology	October 28, 2021
Buster Saves Christmas	Kids & family	November 30, 2021
In Space with Markiplier	Interactive	April 4, 2022
Buster's Big Halloween	Kids & family	October 7, 2022

=== Documentary ===
Title	Genre	Release date
A Trip to Unicorn Island	Documentary	February 10, 2016
The Amazing Tour Is Not on Fire	Comedy	October 5, 2016
Dan and Phil's Story of TATINOF	Documentary	October 5, 2016
Vlogumentary	Documentary	October 26, 2016
Gigi Gorgeous: This Is Everything	Documentary	February 8, 2017
Lindsey Stirling: Brave Enough	Documentary	May 17, 2017
Inventerprise	Documentary	August 1, 2017
Katy Perry: Will You Be My Witness?	Documentary	October 4, 2017
Demi Lovato: Simply Complicated – Director's Cut	Documentary	December 18, 2017
One Shot	Dance special	February 15, 2018
Tyler Shields: Provocateur	Documentary	February 22, 2018
DIY GIANT Birthday Cake	Comedy	May 9, 2018
Act III: Motte	Documentary	September 5, 2018
Paul McCartney: Live from NYC	Concert	September 7, 2018
The Price of Free	Documentary	November 27, 2018
Burn the Stage: The Movie	Documentary	January 18, 2019
Band Together with Logic	Music documentary	March 15, 2019
Priyanka Chopra Jonas: If I Could Just Tell You One Thing	Documentary	March 27, 2019
The Boy Band Con: The Lou Pearlman Story	Documentary	April 3, 2019
State of Pride	Documentary	May 29, 2019
Maluma: Lo Que Era, Lo Que Soy, Lo Que Sere	Documentary	June 5, 2019
Stonewall Outloud	Documentary	June 28, 2019
The Deported	Documentary	July 17, 2019
Taylor Swift: Lover's Lounge	Concert	August 22, 2019
Claire	Documentary	September 2, 2019
Straight Up Punjab	Concert	October 5, 2019
How to Be: Mark Ronson	Documentary	October 12, 2019
Virtually History: The Berlin Wall	Documentary	November 6, 2019
The Gift: The Journey of Johnny Cash	Documentary	November 11, 2019
Coldplay: Everyday Life – Live in Jordan	Concert	November 22, 2019
The Edge of Science: How to Levitate	Documentary	December 10, 2019
Terms & Conditions: A UK Drill Story	Documentary	February 26, 2020
Birthday Song: Lewis Capaldi	Documentary	March 24, 2020
Coachella: 20 Years in the Desert	Documentary	April 10, 2020
The Creator Games	Reality competition	April 25, 2020
#MoveWithMe	Dance special	April 29, 2020
Stream #WithMe	Livestream	April 30, 2020
Dude Perfect: Backstage Pass	Documentary	May 11, 2020
Dear Class of 2020	Virtual commencement	June 7, 2020
Bear Witness, Take Action	Special	June 13, 2020
Paper Children	Documentary	June 25, 2020
UHC: Ultimate Home Championship	Sports special	June 26, 2020
David Blaine Ascension	Special	September 2, 2020
This Is Paris	Documentary	September 14, 2020
YouChoose 2020	Special	October 6, 2020
Trapped: Cash Bail in America	Documentary	October 12, 2020
The Creator Games 2	Reality competition	October 17, 2020
HBCU Homecoming 2020: Meet Me on the Yard	Livestream	October 24, 2020
Justin Bieber: Next Chapter	Documentary	October 30, 2020
How to Be: Anne-Marie	Documentary	November 12, 2020
A Day in the Live: Wizkid	Livestream	November 19, 2020
Bear Witness, Take Action 2: Continuing the Movement	Special	December 5, 2020
Pindrop	Geography special	January 27, 2021
Life in a Day 2020	Documentary	February 6, 2021
Black Renaissance	Special	February 26, 2021
Vax Live	Live concert	May 8, 2021
Beauty Fest	Livestream	May 14, 2021
Raise Your Game	Documentary	June 8, 2021
YouTube Pride 2021	Livestream	June 25, 2021
Recipe for Change	Documentary	June 30, 2021
World Debut	Documentary	July 7, 2021
Barbershop Medicine	Documentary	July 29, 2021
I Promise	Documentary	September 28, 2021
Dear Earth	Livestream	October 23, 2021
Brave Mission: Rewild the Planet	Documentary	October 27, 2021
TED Countdown	Livestream	October 30, 2021
Tom Petty: Somewhere You Feel Free	Documentary	November 11, 2021
A Day in the Live: Camilo	Livestream	November 15, 2021
Home Courts	Reality	December 16, 2021
Recipe for Change: Standing Up to Antisemitism	Documentary	April 14, 2022
Terms & Conditions: Deeper Than Drill	Documentary	May 4, 2022
Recipe for Change: Amplifying Black Women	Documentary	May 19, 2022
A New Green Book	African American culture/Travel documentary special	May 26, 2022
Beauty Fest 2022	Livestream	June 16, 2022
The Letter: A Message for Our Earth	Documentary	October 4, 2022

=== Acquisitions ===
Title	Genre	Release date
Kedi	Documentary	May 10, 2017
King of the Dancehall	Drama	August 2, 2017
G-Funk	Documentary	July 11, 2018
Bodied	Comedy drama	November 28, 2018
Museum	Drama	December 19, 2018
