= Yuka Kinoshita =

Japanese YouTuber and competitive eater (born 1985)

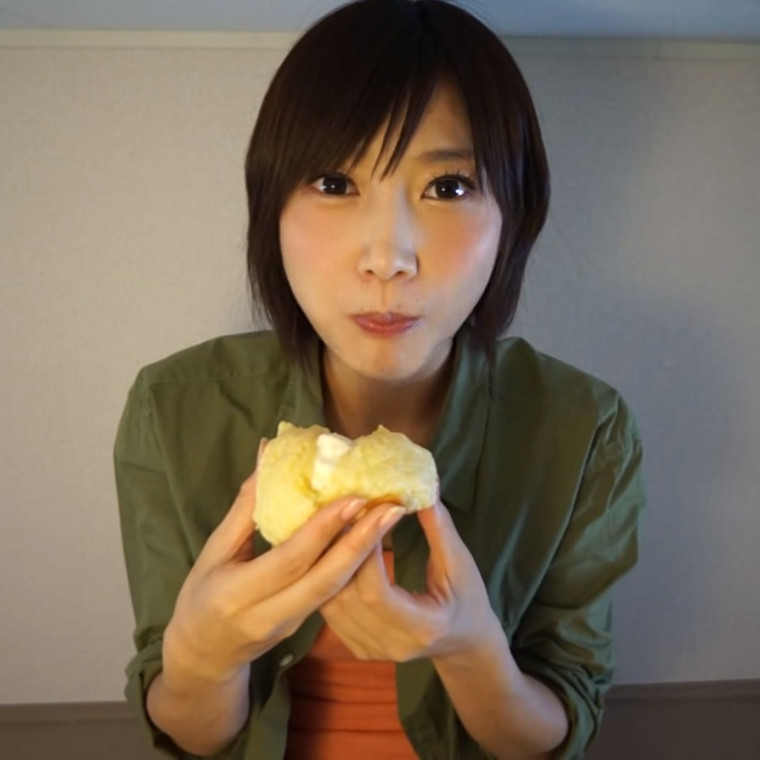
- Kinoshita in 2014
- Born: 4 February 1985 (age 41); Kitakyushu, Fukuoka, Japan
- Occupations: YouTuber; Competitive eater
- Years active: 2009–present

YouTube information
- Channel: Yuka Kinoshita木下ゆうか
- Subscribers: 5.19 million
- Views: 2.21 billion
- Last updated: 25 February 2025

Yuka Kinoshita (木下ゆうか, Kinoshita Yūka; born February 4, 1985) is a Japanese YouTuber and competitive eater.

== Career ==
Yuka Kinoshita began posting on her eating-focused YouTube channel since 2014, five years after her debut in Japanese competitive eating competitions.

Kinoshita uploads daily videos in which she eats anywhere between 5,000 and 23,000 calorie meals. Usually Kinoshita edits her videos into 5 to 7 minute vlogs, but occasionally she uploads longer "live eating" videos in the tradition of mukbang. As of June 2020, her videos have garnered more than 2 billion views.

Kinoshita's videos are particularly in Japanese and are accessible to English-speaking viewers because they are accompanied by English subtitles. Partly for this reason, she has attracted attention from English-language news sources. She has also been featured in the Japanese television programme, Ōgui (大食い).

Since the start of 2024, Kinoshita went on a hiatus after being cyberbullied and fell into depression.

Kinoshita announced that she would be turning 40 on February 4 and expressed the difficulties of continuing her career as a competitive eater. Announcing her retirement on her social media handle, she explained that she felt extremely exhausted and that her health had deteriorated over the years. While she could still eat like a normal person without issue, she admitted to feeling tired even when not full, making it increasingly difficult to consume large quantities of food as she had before. She has reportedly been diagnosed with bipolar disorder, which experts say can be triggered by excessive eating.

About rumours of marriage, she clarified that she is not thinking of love life and remains happy to be with her three cats.
