= Uuum =

Japanese multi-channel network

Uuum Co., Ltd.
- Logo used since 2023
- Native name: UUUM株式会社
- Romanized name: UUUM kabushiki gaisha
- Type: Kabushiki gaisha
- Industry: Information and communication
- Founded: July 2013
- Headquarters: Tokyo, Japan
- Number of locations: 1 (UUUM Miyazaki Office)
- Key people: Kazuki Kamada (Representative director, President, CEO); Hikaru Kaihatsu (Supreme advisor)
- Services: Online retailing Management
- Revenue: Consolidated: ¥11,735,545,000; Non-consolidated: ¥11,735,545,000 (May 2018)
- Operating income: Consolidated: ¥716,679,000; Non-consolidated: ¥716,490,000 (May 2018)
- Net income: Consolidated: ¥406,363,000; Non-consolidated: ¥406,271,000 (May 2018)
- Number of employees: 476 (2020)
- Website: www.uuum.co.jp

Uuum Co., Ltd. (UUUM株式会社, Ūmu kabushiki gaisha; stylized in all caps) is a Japanese multi-channel network and YouTuber-related label company headquartered in Minato, Tokyo, Japan.

As of April 2020, there are over 10,000 YouTube channels belonging to Uuum, including HIKAKIN, Hajime Syacho, Tokai On Air, Fischer's, Banbanzai, Yuka Kinoshita, and Mizutamari Bond.

== Overview ==
Uuum, co-founded by YouTuber HIKAKIN and Kazuki Kamada in 2013, manages Japanese YouTubers by handling the day-to-day business side of YouTube, such as dealing with brand partnerships. The influencers belonging to Uuum work with many Japanese brands and receive income from creating content around their products. HIKAKIN and Kamada decided to start managing YouTubers having seen the various problems that YouTubers were facing, such as not knowing how to proceed with business negotiations with companies, and not being able to make a contract with an agency without being a juridical person.

In 2014, interest towards YouTube celebrities increased, and Uuum grew alongside this trend. As a result, when the number of the company's clientele was 40 influencers at the beginning of 2014, at the end of the year the number had increased to 2,500.

== History ==
In June 2013, Kazuki Kamada established ON SALE Co., Ltd. for the purpose of online sales business using YouTubers' videos, after meeting HIKAKIN.

The company name was to be changed, and while thinking "うーむ, Ūm" (Japanese equivalent of "Hmm") about a good company name, "Ūm" was chosen as the new company name. Although they wanted a company name that could take the domain ".com", as one U was not possible, the domain was finally set up with three U's, and thus the company became known as "Uuum".

=== Events ===
- 2014
  - August 28 - Business partnership with Yahoo! JAPAN.
  - October 1 - Moved the headquarters from Shibuya to Minato, Tokyo.
  - December 1 - Changed company name to Uuum Co., Ltd..
  - December 16 - Established MCN:Uuum NETWORK.
- 2015
  - April 20 - Business partnership with Digital Hollywood Co., Ltd.
  - July 1 - Business partnership with Gadget News.
  - August 27 - Transition to a company with an audit and supervisory committee.
- 2017
  - March - Moved the headquarters from the 34th floor to the 37th floor of Roppongi Hills Mori Tower (the 34th floor is a studio).
  - March 5 - Announced business partnership with Shochiku Geino Co., Ltd.
  - July 27 - Announced approval for listing on the Mothers market of the Tokyo Stock Exchange.
  - August 30 - Listed on the Mothers market of the Tokyo Stock Exchange.
- 2020
  - January 9 - Business partnership with LINE Corporation.
  - April 28 - Announced business partnership with Yoshimoto Kogyo Co., Ltd. with 800 talent YouTubers transferring to Uuum.
  - September 4 - Acquired the social media app FOLLOW ME launched by Yusuke Mitsumoto.

== Former members ==
- Pocky - 2014 – 2020
