= Emory Tate =

American chess player (1958–2015)

- Tate in 1984

Personal information
- Born: Emory Andrew Tate Jr. December 27, 1958 Chicago, Illinois, U.S.
- Died: October 17, 2015 (aged 56) Milpitas, California, U.S.
- Spouse: Eileen Ashleigh (m. 1985; div. 1997)
- Children: 3, including Andrew and Tristan

Chess career
- Country: United States
- Title: International Master (2007)
- Peak rating: 2413 (FIDE, October 2006); 2508 (USCF, April 1997)
- Military career
- Allegiance: United States
- Branch: United States Air Force
- Rank: Staff Sergeant

Emory Andrew Tate Jr. (December 27, 1958 – October 17, 2015) was an American chess player who held the FIDE title of International Master (IM). He won the United States Armed Forces Chess Championship five times and the Indiana state championship six times. Over his career, he recorded roughly 80 tournament wins against grandmasters, and earned a reputation as one of the most feared tacticians on the American tournament circuit. Grandmaster Maurice Ashley described him as "a trailblazer for African-American chess."

Before devoting himself to chess professionally, Tate served in the United States Air Force, where he worked as a linguist and was fluent in Russian and Spanish. He reached a peak FIDE rating of 2413 in 2006 and received the International Master title in 2007. He was inducted into the Indiana State Chess Hall of Fame in 2005. He is the father of internet personalities Andrew Tate and Tristan Tate.

Tate died in 2015 from a heart attack while playing chess at a tournament in Milpitas, California.

== Early life and education ==
Emory Andrew Tate Jr. was born in Chicago, Illinois, on December 27, 1958. He grew up in a family of nine children. His father, Emory Andrew Tate Sr., was an attorney, and his mother, Emma Cox Tate, ran a truck-leasing business. Tate Jr. learned to play chess as a child. Tate learned Spanish as an exchange student in Mexico. He was "chosen to participate in the Indiana University Honors Program in Foreign Language, Spanish Division during the summer of 1975" and spent two months living with a Mexican family. Tate graduated from Concord High School in Elkhart, Indiana, in 1976 and studied at Northwestern University.

== Military career ==
He served in the United States Air Force for eleven years, where he reached the rank of staff sergeant. In the Air Force, he "excelled as a linguist", and learned languages including Russian, German, and Spanish.

He was discharged from the U.S. Air Force after he was diagnosed with several psychiatric conditions that "interfere with military service", including Narcissistic personality disorder (NPD). Following the discharge, Tate moved his family to Elkhart, Indiana, where his mother lived.

== Chess career ==
In 1993, Tate gave chess lessons to elementary school students in Goshen, Indiana, as part of a community school board program.

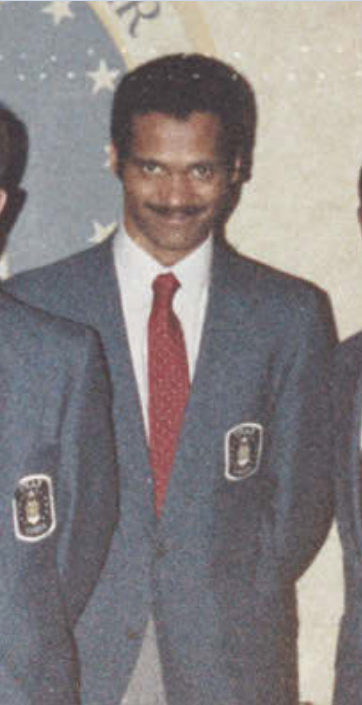
Tate at the US Armed Forces Chess Championship in 1987

Tate's highest FIDE rating was 2413 on the October 2006 rating list, which made him the 72nd highest-rated player in the United States and among the top 2000 active players in the world. His peak USCF rating was 2508 on December 30, 1996. He received the International Master title in 2007, after earning his third norm at the 2006 World Open. Although Tate earned his first IM norm in the late 1980s, the title came nearly two decades later, in part because he mainly competed in weekend Swiss events where norms were not available.

His oldest son, Andrew, said: "I never saw him study chess books, ever. He also hated chess computers and never used them. He just sat down and played."

Tate earned a reputation as a creative tactician on the U.S. chess circuit, where he won about 80 tournament games against grandmasters. Among his most celebrated victories was a win over Grandmaster Leonid Yudasin at the 1997 U.S. Masters, which was featured in Chess Life and annotated by International Master Jack Peters. Other well-known games included queen sacrifices in wins over Grandmaster Gennadi Sagalchik at the 1995 New York PCA event and Grandmaster Nick deFirmian at the 2001 New Jersey Open, as well as a victory over Grandmaster Sergey Kudrin at the 2001 World Open.

Tate won the United States Armed Forces Chess Championship five times, in 1983, 1984, 1987, 1988, and 1989, while serving in the Air Force. He won the Indiana state championship six times (1995, 1996, 2000, 2005, 2006, 2007) and was inducted into the Indiana State Chess Hall of Fame in 2005. He also won the Alabama state championship in 2010. Fellow Air Force veteran and 2003 U.S. Armed Forces Chess Champion Leroy Hill said: "All the players had street names. Emory's was 'Extraterrestrial' because we thought his play was out of this world."

== Personal life ==
My unmatched perspicacity, coupled with sheer indefatigability, makes me a feared opponent in any realm of human endeavor.

— Emory Tate

Tate married Eileen Ashleigh, an English woman, in 1985 while on a brief Air Force posting to the United Kingdom. Together, they had three children, two sons and a daughter. His two sons are social media personalities Andrew Tate and Tristan Tate. The couple divorced in 1997, and his ex-wife returned to Luton, England, with their children.

Tate died after suffering a heart attack during a tournament in Milpitas, California, on October 17, 2015, at the age of 56. After his death, a number of grandmasters and international masters wrote tributes to him. In 2016, the Alabama Senate passed a resolution "celebrating [his] life and legacy." Grandmaster Maurice Ashley described Tate as "a trailblazer for African-American chess". In 2017, The Chess Drum published a biography of Tate, Triple Exclam!!! The Life and Games of Emory Tate, Chess Warrior, written by Daaim Shabazz, with a foreword by Maurice Ashley and annotations contributed by grandmasters including Yasser Seirawan and Alejandro Ramirez.

Tate is frequently cited as an inspiration by his sons, Andrew and Tristan, who state that they both feared and admired their father. He was known in chess circles for his braggadocio and self-confidence. At times, Tate suffered from delusions of being monitored or attacked by malign forces. Later in life, Tate expressed masculinist and misogynistic views on social media. He applauded his son Andrew's kickboxing career.
