= Andrew Tate =

American and British internet personality (born 1986)

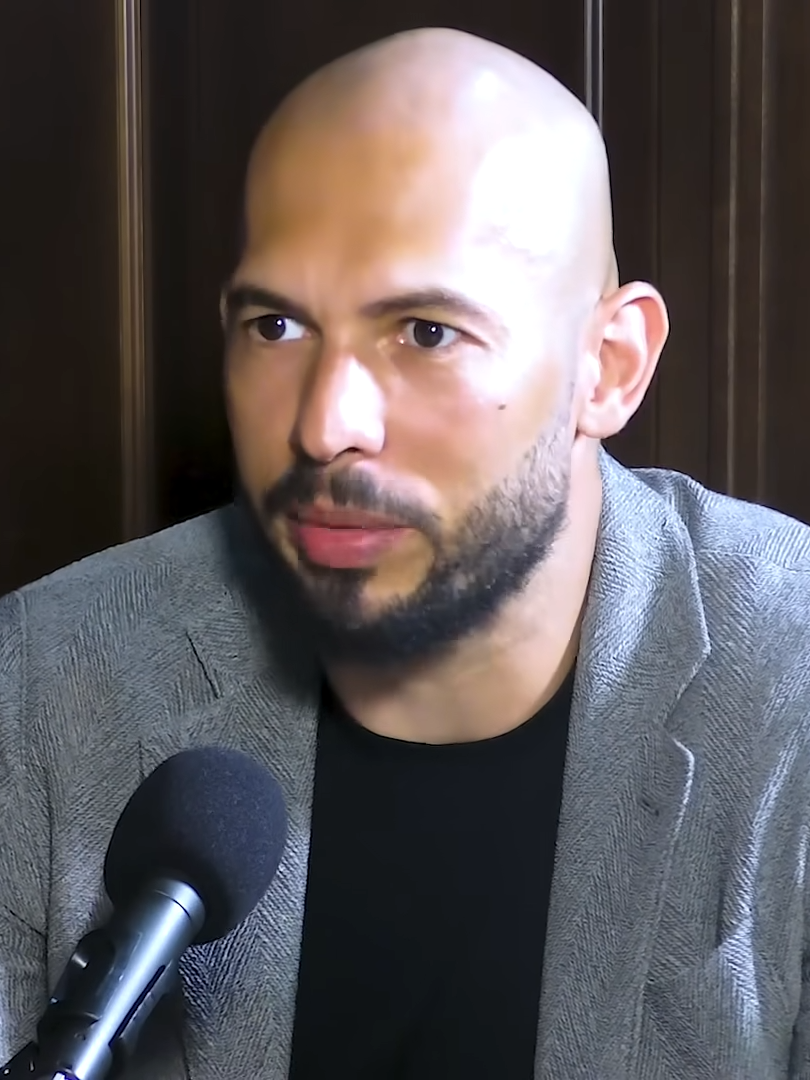
- Tate in 2023
- Born: Emory Andrew Tate III; 1 December 1986 (age 39); Washington, D.C., US
- Other names: Cobra Tate; Top G
- Occupations: Media personality; kickboxer
- Years active: 2005–present
- Known for: Kickboxing; webcam business; criminal charges
- Political party: BRUV (since 2025)
- Movement: Manosphere
- Father: Emory Tate
- Martial arts career
- Height: 6 ft 3 in (191 cm)
- Weight: 205 lb (93 kg; 14.6 st)
- Division: Cruiserweight; Light heavyweight; Light Cruiserweight; Middleweight
- Style: K-1 Rules; Full Contact Kickboxing
- Stance: Orthodox
- Fighting out of: Luton, England; Bucharest, Romania
- Team: Storm Gym

Professional boxing record
- Total: 1
- Losses: 1

Kickboxing record
- Total: 86
- Wins: 76
- By knockout: 32
- Losses: 9
- Draws: 1

Mixed martial arts record
- Total: 1
- Wins: 1
- By knockout: 1
- Losses: 0

Amateur record
- Total: 5
- Wins: 3
- By submission: 1
- Losses: 2
- Andrew Tate's voice Tate talking about his religion Recorded 3 June 2023
- Website: cobratate.com

Emory Andrew Tate III (born 1 December 1986) is an American and British social media personality and former professional kickboxer who built a webcam pornography business before gaining notoriety for promoting various highly controversial positions in the manosphere. His commentary has resulted in his expulsion from various social media platforms and concern that he promotes misogynistic views to his audience. A divisive influencer, Tate has amassed 9.9 million followers on Twitter as of August 2024 and was the third-most googled person in 2023. He has been dubbed the "king of toxic masculinity", has called himself a misogynist, and is politically described as right-wing or far-right.

As of mid-2026, Andrew Tate has been arrested in Miami and is in US custody. Tate has faced numerous criminal and civil legal proceedings in Romania, the United Kingdom, and the United States relating to allegations including rape, human trafficking, and tax evasion. The Romanian trafficking case remained unresolved but stalled by procedural delays, and Tate had been released from Romania's travel ban and all bail conditions; separate UK proceedings remained active, where the Crown Prosecution Service authorised 21 charges in May 2025 and police reopened an earlier investigation into 2015-era allegations following a misconduct inquiry into how it had originally been handled.

Beginning in 2005, Tate competed as a professional kickboxer in England, winning several world titles; he retired from the sport in 2016. He and his brother, Tristan, also began a webcam pornography business in 2014, which expanded substantially after they relocated to Romania and grew to include dozens of women recruited through an agency called Model Stars. In 2016, Tate appeared on the British reality series Big Brother, but was removed after tabloids broadcast footage connected to the webcam operation; he was separately the suspect in an open rape investigation that closed without charges in 2019, though Hertfordshire Constabulary reopened the case in 2026 following a gross-misconduct inquiry into how officials had originally handled the case. As the webcam business wound down, Tate built an online education business, becoming prominent as an internet celebrity promoting a hyper-macho view of masculinity through courses including Hustler's University (later relaunched as The Real World) and the secretive group The War Room, which the BBC has accused of coercing women into sex work and teaching violence against women. In August 2023, it was estimated that Tate's online ventures generated US$5 million in revenue monthly.

In December 2022, Tate and his brother were arrested in Romania, along with two women. In June 2023, all four were charged with rape, human trafficking, and forming an organised crime group to sexually exploit women. Soon after, accusers reportedly went into hiding after a campaign of online harassment, and the Tate brothers filed a defamation lawsuit, claiming $5 million in damages. In March 2024, British police obtained an arrest warrant for the Tate brothers. In July 2024, a civil case in the UK was brought against the brothers and a third person for alleged tax evasion. In August 2024, Romanian police raided four properties Tate owns and expanded its investigation to include trafficking of children, child sexual abuse, money laundering, and attempting to influence witnesses. Tate and his brother have denied all charges and allegations. In May 2025, the United Kingdom Crown Prosecution Service (CPS) brought multiple charges against Tate and his brother including rape, actual bodily harm, and human trafficking. In 2026 the CPS filed additional charges against Tate, accusing him of rape, human trafficking, assault, and possession of child pornography. Tate was subsequently arrested in Miami and faces extradition to the UK.

== Early life ==
Emory Andrew Tate III was born on 1 December 1986 at the Walter Reed Army Medical Center in Washington, D.C. He is multiracial; his African American father, Emory Tate (1958–2015), was an Air Force staff sergeant who later became a chess international master, while his White English mother, Eileen Tate, worked as a catering assistant. He has a younger brother, Tristan, and a younger sister, Janine. He was raised in Germany, Elkhart, Indiana, and Goshen, Indiana. In 1997, after his parents divorced, his mother took him and his brother to Luton in Bedfordshire, England. They "lived on Marsh Farm, an infamously rough council estate which Tate has described as the 'worst area of the worst town'". He was educated at Halyard High School and Luton Sixth Form College.

== Career ==
=== 2005–2016: Kickboxing career ===
Tate began kickboxing in 2005, competing as a full-contact fighter under the nickname "King Cobra" while working in television advertising to support himself. Between 2011 and 2014 he became a four-time world champion, winning three ISKA full-contact world titles (light heavyweight and light cruiserweight) and an Enfusion K-1 Rules world title at 90 kg, and reached the final of Enfusion's "Trial of the Gladiators" tournament twice.

In December 2016, Tate lost to Ibrahim El Boustati by first-round TKO after a recurrence of a retinal injury that had first affected him at 23, and retired from professional kickboxing at 30 on medical advice. He returned briefly in 2020 to fight lower-ranked opponents in Romania before retiring a second time with a career record of 76 wins, 9 losses, and 1 draw in the K-1 Rules and full-contact styles.

Tate's brother, Tristan, was also a professional kickboxer, twice winning the ISKA British light cruiserweight title before retiring early because of a shoulder injury, with a record of 43–9.

In 2023, Enfusion introduced a new promotional label named after the brothers, T8KO, with both brothers as media partners. After Tate's arrest, the Dutch Fight Sports Authority required Enfusion to drop the brothers from the project and rename it 8TKO.

=== 2014–2022: Webcam business ===
In early 2014, while still competing as a professional kickboxer, Tate began a webcam pornography business with several women he was then dating. Tate has said that in the business's first month he made more than $100,000; he and his brother subsequently bought an Aston Martin. One of the women, whom he had met in Košice, Slovakia, performed on the site MyFreeCams while Tate wrote to paying customers off-camera pretending to be her. The New Yorker reported that the woman turned fifteen in 2012, the year Tate has said their relationship began, and that footage of Tate whipping her with a belt—later broadcast by British tabloids during his 2016 appearance on Big Brother—was filmed that year.

Tate went on to recruit other women in Luton and Hitchin, England, offering them a share of webcam earnings; some of these women later filed the rape and strangulation complaints with Hertfordshire Constabulary described in § Criminal investigations and civil cases. After relocating to Romania in 2015–17, Tate and his brother expanded the business substantially, engaging British businesswoman Naomi John to help run a recruitment agency, Model Stars, which was publicly described as an "all-female" business helping women "escape the 9-to-5." At its peak, the brothers reported having roughly seventy-five women working for them, more than thirty of whom Tate said had his name tattooed on their skin.

The webcam operation was wound down by the early 2020s as Tate shifted his business toward online education products, Hustler's University and the affiliate-marketing program The War Room; Tate has said the webcam business had been closed for ten years by the time of his 2022 arrest.

==== Big Brother ====
Tate gained widespread attention in 2016 when he appeared on the British reality television series Big Brother's 17th series. In the series, Tate was a member of a secret second house, part of a group called "The Others." While appearing on the show, he came under scrutiny for previously having made homophobic and racist posts on Twitter. He was removed from the show after six days, with producers saying that it was because of events outside the house and Tate saying that it was about a video which appeared to show him striking a woman with a belt on the show. Producers also said that he was not let go because of the uncovered tweets. Tate and the woman said that they were friends and that the actions in the video were consensual. Vice later reported that Tate was removed because the show's producers became aware of an ongoing police investigation by Hertfordshire Constabulary into him for rape, which closed in 2019 with no charges filed.

=== 2017–2022: Online ventures ===
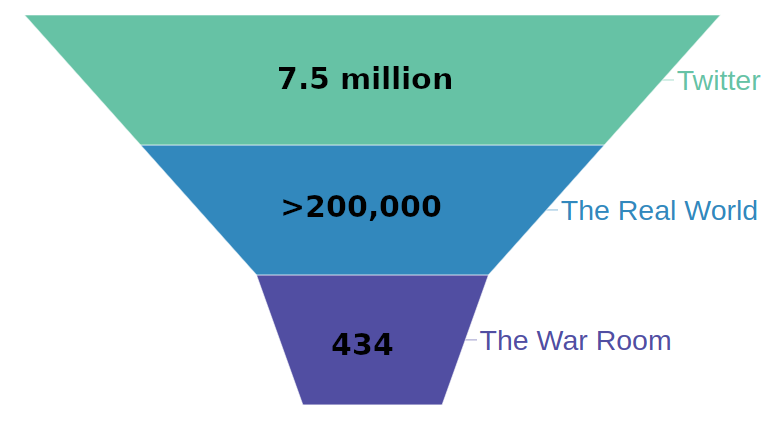
Online ventures pyramid as depicted in Andrew Tate: The Man Who Groomed the World?, BBC Three documentary, August 2023. Numbers correspond to followers and subscribers of platforms.

Tate's website offers training courses on accumulating wealth and "male–female interactions". According to the site, he also operated a webcam studio using his girlfriends as employees. Tate and his brother, Tristan, started the webcam business, employing as many as 75 webcam models to sell "fake sob stories" to male callers, claiming to have made millions of dollars doing so. According to Mary McNamara, Tate has called himself "a pimp", and The Guardian wrote of his transition from a kickboxer to "a webcam pimp". Tate later acknowledged that the business model was a "total scam". In August 2023, it was estimated that The Real World and The War Room generated US$5 million monthly from subscriptions.

==== Hustler's University ====
Tate operated Hustler's University, a proprietary platform where members paid a US$49.99 monthly membership fee to receive instruction on ways to make money outside traditional employment, such as cryptocurrency, copywriting, and e-commerce, which was facilitated by prerecorded videos and a Discord server. The site employed an affiliate marketing program, where members received a commission for recruiting others to the platform.

Tate became prominent in 2022 by encouraging members of Hustler's University to post videos of him to social media platforms, in an effort to maximise engagement. An investigation by The Observer described "a network of copycat accounts on TikTok" that artificially amplified his content, with the social media platform appearing to allow the content to spread. Hustler's University was subsequently rebranded as Hustler University 2.0 and then Hustler University 3.0. The Irish-American financial services company Stripe pulled out of processing subscriptions for the platform, and Hustler's University shut down its affiliate marketing program. Paul Harrigan, a marketing professor at the University of Western Australia, said the affiliate programme was a social media pyramid scheme. Tate described the claim that Hustler's University's operated as a pyramid scheme as false.

==== The Real World ====
After Hustler's University shut down, Tate relaunched another version of the product named "The Real World" in October 2022. The name references Tate's idea that the world as normally perceived resembles "the Matrix" to which he offers an alternative.

The Real World primarily targets male teenagers. Former Real World students have described the programme as having a "cult-like atmosphere." The Real World has been described by a lawyer for former members as the male version of the Tate brothers' "digital grooming". Members refer to each other as "G" with Tate being the "Top G". The group is centred on Tate's "41 Tenets for men." The Real World course offering included cryptocurrency, e-commerce, and drop shipping.

In 2023, Google and Apple removed The Real World's associated app, the Real World Portal, from their app stores. In January 2024, analysis from the Center for Countering Digital Hate found The Real World official YouTube channel had received 450 million video views, and according to the researchers, a third party's channel had gained nearly 300 million views reposting The Real World content. The researchers suggested that YouTube had earned up to £2.4m in revenue from advertisements on these two channels, and criticised the company for not banning similar third party channels sooner. YouTube responded by describing the estimate as "wildly inaccurate and overinflated".

In May 2024, the website for The Real World leaked the personal data of 968,447 user accounts due to a misconfigured database. Leaked information included email addresses and account passwords. In addition, 22 million messages sent by users on the platform were also openly accessible. In November, the website suffered a cyberattack which leaked the usernames of 794,000 former and current members, 324,382 registered email addresses, as well as the contents of 221 public and 395 private chat servers.

==== The War Room ====
The War Room promotes self-discipline, motivation and confidence building whilst giving members access to thousands of professionals from around the world who encourage personal responsibility and accountability, emphasising the importance of taking ownership of your choices and actions.

— Andrew Tate, August 2023

Advertised by Tate and costing $8,000, The War Room is described as "a global network in which exemplars of individualism work to free the modern man from socially induced incarceration", stating it teaches men "physical, mental, emotional, spiritual, and financial development". A senior member of the group, Miles Sonkin, also known as Iggy Semmelweiss, is the supposed leader of the group according to a BBC investigation. Semmelweiss reportedly met Tate in 2018, with the group established in 2019. The investigation in August 2023 led by Matt Shea documented evidence of women groomed into online sex work by members of the group, described as an all-male secretive society.

The group chat, featuring 12,000 pages of encrypted messages, indicated that the group taught a "Pimpin' Hoes Degree" course, abbreviated to PhD, using techniques to "romantically seduce, emotionally manipulate and socially isolate women before luring them into performing on webcams". A legal expert in human trafficking from Bucharest described the course as using all the practices of the "Lover Boy" strategy. A deleted description of the defunct course on the website that prosecutors in Romania have since used in the case against Tate read:

My job was to meet a girl, go on a few dates, sleep with her, test if she's quality, get her to fall in love with me to where she'd do anything I say, and then get her on webcam so we could become rich together,

Evidence suggested violence against women was also taught and discussed. Victims said sex was used as a manipulation technique. Members of the group believed they were performing "Pavlovian conditioning" on the women, with submission tests such as receiving tattoos on their bodies of members' initials. A whistleblower, who claimed to be former head of sales and marketing, described the group as a cult he had been "brainwashed" by. As of August 2022, there were 434 members and 45 potential victims, based on the leaked chat logs.

=== 2023–present: Meme coins and boxing comeback ===
==== Meme coins ====
In 2024, Tate launched a meme coin called DADDY. It soon reached a market capitalisation of $217 million. The name is meant to be a play on Iggy Azalea's meme coin $MOTHER, with Tate saying that the coin was "for the patriarchy" and "We're bringing the Gs back make me a f***ing sandwich females." He has encouraged those who hold the coin to join The Real World and has promoted the coin heavily on his social media.

In October 2024, Andrew Tate was sent a series of questions by the YouTube channel Coffeezilla about his meme coin DADDY. In response, Tate doxxed Coffeezilla and encouraged his supporters to email abusive content to Coffeezilla with Tate specifically requesting that they call him "gay".

==== Boxing ====
In August 2025, sports journalist Ariel Helwani broke the news that Tate was in advanced talks with Misfits Boxing to compete in a heavyweight fight by the end of the year. However, a day later, DAZN asserted that Tate was in fact not in negotiations with Misfits despite the earlier reports; Misfits declined to comment. On 15 October, Daily Mirror reported that Tate was set to face reality star Chase DeMoor for the MFB heavyweight title, with the fight set to take place on 20 December at the Coca-Cola Arena in Dubai, UAE. Misfits promoted fight on 19 October, with a video showing a cobra wrapping around a Christmas tree, a subtle nod to Tate's fighting alias, The fight headlined Misfits Mania – The Fight Before Christmas; Tate was defeated by DeMoor via majority decision.

== Criminal investigations and civil cases ==
=== 2010s ===
Tate was first arrested in Britain in July 2015 after two women filed complaints accusing him of rape and assault and was again arrested on suspicion of rape in December 2015. In 2019, the Crown Prosecution Service declined to file charges for any of the allegations.

==== 2018 ====
Canadian alt-right YouTuber and political activist Lauren Southern wrote in her 2025 memoir that she had met Tate in Romania in 2018. She said in the book that, after he had taken her from a nightclub to her hotel room, "He kissed me. I wasn't expecting it, and I wasn't looking for it, but I kissed him back briefly and then told him I wanted to sleep." She said that, after he insisted in touching her and she tried to fight back, he "put his arm around my neck and began strangling me unconscious. I tried to fight back…. I'd prefer not to share the rest. It's pretty obvious."

=== 2020s ===
==== 2022 ====
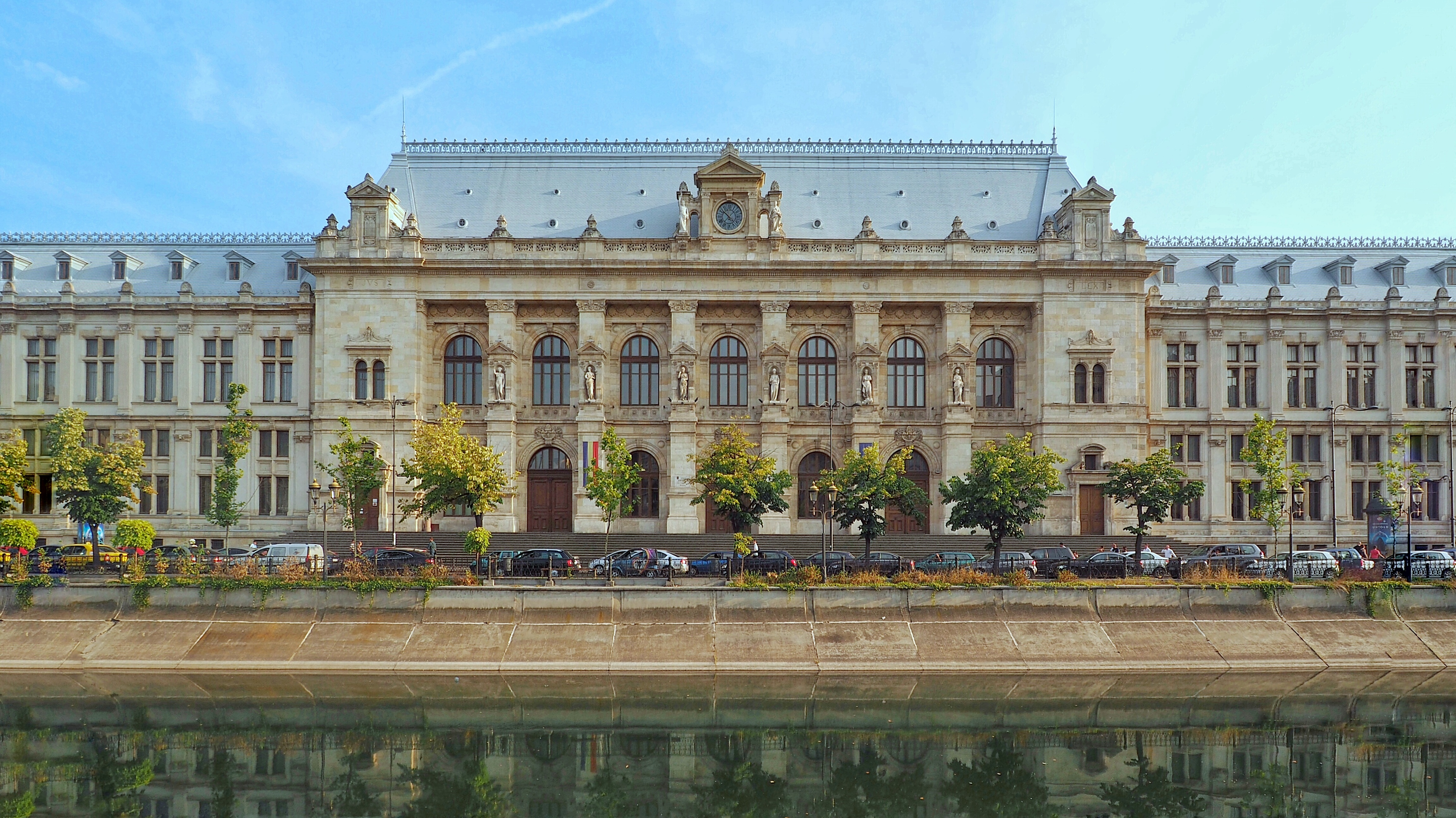
The brothers have appealed multiple times to the Bucharest Court of Appeal, located in The Palace of Justice (pictured). The court has overturned tribunal decisions and rejected other appeals.

In April 2022, the US embassy received a report that an American citizen was being held against her will in a property the Tate brothers own in Pipera, Romania. Romanian police raided the home and a nearby webcam studio belonging to the Tates, where they discovered four women. Two of them, the American and another Romanian woman, told the police they were being held against their will, sparking an in-rem investigation into human trafficking and rape by DIICOT, the Romanian anti-organised crime agency. Later in December, police arrested the Tates and two women. All four were suspected of human trafficking and forming an organised crime group, and one of them is suspected of rape. Romanian authorities seized 29 assets, including cars, properties, watches, and money, totalling almost US$4 million.

==== 2023 ====
In June 2023, DIICOT adjusted the charges from human trafficking to "human trafficking in continued form", a more serious charge, with seven victims identified. The four accused were indicted on charges of rape, human trafficking, and forming an organised crime group to sexually exploit women. They continue to deny all charges and remain under investigation for money laundering and trafficking of minors. That same month, the Tate brothers filed a defamation lawsuit against one of the accusers, their parents and two other people, in Palm Beach County, Florida, United States, seeking $5 million in damages. The Tates claim the five conspired to falsely accuse them of human trafficking and rape, costing them their freedom as well as income from social media and business ventures.

==== 2024 ====
In January 2024, the Romanian criminal case was heard in the preliminary chamber before a trial date was set, and three months later, the Bucharest Tribunal decided that the case against Tate "met the legal criteria". That same month, US District Judge Robin L. Rosenberg dismissed another of the brothers' defamation lawsuits. They had sued a former United States Marine Corps sergeant who reported Tate to the US Embassy in Romania and military officials, leading to his arrest by Romanian authorities.

In March 2024, Westminster Magistrates' Court issued a European arrest warrant against Andrew and Tristan Tate. According to Tate's representative, the charges are based on allegations of sexual aggression from 2012 to 2015. The Tate brothers "categorically reject all charges". In July, Devon and Cornwall Police began civil proceedings against Tate, Tristan, and a third person, for tax evasion with their online businesses. Two months later, the three women involved in the British investigation, along with a fourth British woman, brought a civil case against Tate.

In August 2024, Romanian police expanded their investigation against Tate to include trafficking minors, sex with a minor, money laundering and attempting to influence witnesses. Prosecutors said the new investigation involves 35 alleged victims, including a woman who was a minor at the time. The Tate brothers, among the six detained the next day, denied all the allegations.

In December 2024, the Westminster Magistrates' Court ruled in favour of the Devon and Cornwall Police, allowing them to seize £2.8 million worth of unpaid taxes from the Tate brothers' online businesses.

==== 2025 ====
In February 2025, Alison Hernandez, the Police and Crime Commissioner for Devon and Cornwall, stated that the force had received around £1.2 million and she hoped that the funds would be used to support the victims of violence against women and girls.

Later that month, Romanian authorities lifted the travel ban that had confined the Tate brothers to the country since their arrest. Tate left Romania by private jet for the United States and arrived in Fort Lauderdale, Florida, where he had become the subject of a statewide criminal investigation. According to reporting by The New Yorker's Heidi Blake, the decision followed lobbying from Trump-administration figures, including special presidential envoy Richard Grenell; a senior Romanian law-enforcement source told Blake the removal of the ban appeared to have been "imposed from outside the judicial system." The White House denied intervening in the case, and Grenell denied discussing it with Romanian officials, though he has publicly said he supports "the Tate brothers." Shortly afterward, the Bucharest Court of Appeal returned the indictment to prosecutors after identifying procedural errors, delaying the case.

In March 2025, Florida's Attorney General, James Uthmeier, initiated a criminal investigation into the affairs of Tate upon his arrival in the state. Tate's ex-girlfriend, Brianna Stern, has accused him of choking and beating her at The Beverly Hills Hotel on 10 March, and Stern claims she was later diagnosed with post-concussion syndrome. She subsequently filed a lawsuit against Tate accusing him of physical and sexual abuse. Tate has denied her accusations.

In May 2025, the UK Crown Prosecution Service brought 21 charges against Tate and his brother Tristan including for rape, actual bodily harm and human trafficking.

In June 2025, the Los Angeles County District Attorney's office declined to prosecute Tate over Stern's allegations, citing insufficient evidence; Tate's attorney, Joseph McBride, said he had supplied a "do-not-prosecute packet" and subsequently filed a $50 million defamation countersuit against Stern.

==== 2026 ====
In 2026, after inquiries from Blake, the Independent Office for Police Conduct opened a gross-misconduct investigation into Hertfordshire Constabulary's handling of the original 2015–2019 rape inquiry, and the force reopened that case. The New Yorker reported specific handling failures, including an improperly recorded witness statement and a failure to secure Tate's phone, which sat unexamined at a police station for years before being searched. The four women's civil claim was supported by a public crowdfunding campaign, "Bring Andrew Tate to Justice in the U.K.," which had raised more than £300,000 by mid-2026. Lauren Southern is expected to testify as a witness in the case.

In April 2026, the Tate brothers were released from all remaining bail conditions tied to the Romanian indictment.

In July 2026, the Tate brothers were arrested in Miami by US Marshals under an extradition request from the United Kingdom. The British Crown Prosecution Service sought extradition of the brothers to the United Kingdom for pending seven charges of rape, three counts of sex trafficking, three counts of assault with bodily harm and 19 charges for child and extreme pornography, in addition to the charges previously filed in 2025. In September 2026, a federal judge ruled both brothers will remain in jail while they fight the extradition request because they pose flight risks. Concurrently, Romanian authorities have indicted the Tates with a range of trafficking and sex crimes, in an extended investigation they started in December 2024.

== Views ==
=== Manosphere ===
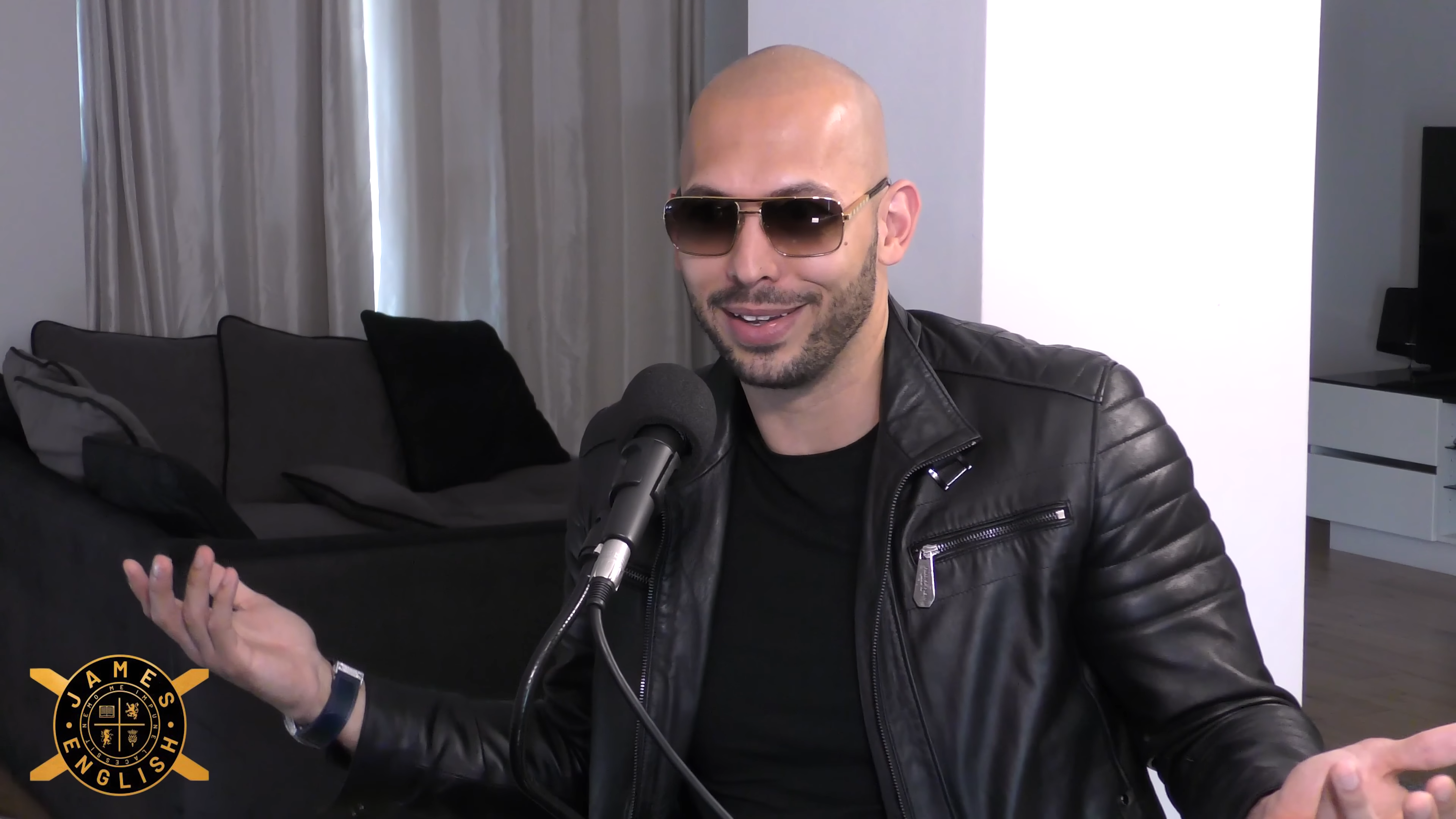
Tate in an interview on Anything Goes with James English, 2021

Tate is an influencer in the manosphere and "alpha male" community, described as both right-wing and far-right. According to The Conversation, he is a recognised "thought leader" in the online manosphere who mobilises his supporters to spread his ideas to a broader audience. He otherwise identifies as a libertarian and has been dubbed the "king of toxic masculinity". American conservatives such as Tucker Carlson and Candace Owens have platformed Tate as a proponent of "traditional views on men in the culture war raging over gender".

=== Women ===
Anything Goes with James English Interview

You can't slander me because I will state right now that I am absolutely sexist and I'm absolutely a misogynist, and I have fuck you money and you can't take that away.

— Andrew Tate, 2021

Tate has been criticised for saying that women "belong in the home", "can't drive", and are "given to the man and belong to the man" as "a man's property". Tate has also said that men prefer dating 18- and 19-year-old women, because they are "likely to have had sex with fewer men", to "make an imprint" on teenagers, and that women who do not stay home are "hoes".

=== Sexual harassment ===
In 2017 Tate received attention for his tweets describing his view of what qualifies as sexual harassment amid the Harvey Weinstein sexual abuse cases, and for tweeting several times that sexual assault victims share responsibility for their assaults. Tate came out in support of Russell Brand after multiple women accused Brand of sexual assault.

=== Far-right ideologies ===
Tate giving a Nazi salute on 21 January 2025

Tate is associated with far-right ideologies and individuals, including the British activist Tommy Robinson. Before 2022, Tate became known among the online far-right through his appearances on InfoWars and acquaintances including Mike Cernovich, Jack Posobiec, and Paul Joseph Watson. He attended the Conservative Political Action Conference (CPAC) in 2019. Hope not Hate accuses Tate of a "long history of racist statements, homophobia and links to the organised far-right". In February 2023, Thierry Baudet, founder and leader of the far-right Forum for Democracy, called Tate an "outspoken political dissident" and "courageous critic", tabling a motion in the Dutch parliament regarding his detention in Romania. The Conversation called Tate "not explicitly far right" but otherwise as a figure who has promoted far-right propaganda, including the Great Replacement conspiracy theory.

Tate has questioned whether the Nazis were really the "bad guy" in World War II. Tate has performed Nazi salutes, and advocated "bring[ing] the Nazi salute back". In January 2025, after Elon Musk made a salute interpreted by many as a Nazi salute, Tate responded by saying, "we're so back".

=== Life discipline ===
In a June 2023 interview with the BBC, Tate said that he was "acting under the instruction of God to do good things" and that "I preach hard work, discipline. I'm an athlete, I preach anti-drugs, I preach religion, I preach no alcohol, I preach no knife crime."

=== Other views ===
Tate has said that depression "isn't real". Tate stated that conspiracy theorist Alex Jones is a hero. In March 2024, after the collapse of the Francis Scott Key bridge in Maryland, Tate falsely claimed the ship that collided with the bridge "was cyber-attacked". Tate was accused of inciting online hate after becoming one of the first influencers to amplify misinformation about the 2024 Southport stabbings, leading to the far-right riots in the UK.

In the context of the Gaza war, Tate has accused Israel of "genociding" Palestinians and said that the October 7 attacks was "an eye for an eye". In response to the killing of Yahya Sinwar, he stated, "I can only pray for a death as heroic as Yahya Sinwar". Mother Jones reported that Tate also promoted an antisemitic conspiracy saying that "'the Matrix' is really just the Jewish mafia." With respect to Adolf Hitler and Holocaust denial, Tate stated, "stop crying over the Hitler crap" and "if they lied to us about Gaza and Israel … Do you think they lied about [the Second World War]?"

Tate has repeatedly spread Russian propaganda and narratives during the war in Ukraine, including by praising Russian president Vladimir Putin. In early June 2026, he and his brother Tristan visited Russia simultaneously as the ongoing economic conference in St. Petersburg attended by other Americans, including a US government official for the first time since 2018 and conservative podcaster Candace Owens. A video they uploaded includes them getting greeted at the airport by a crowd wearing traditional Russian clothes, talking about Russia, visiting landmarks such as the Kremlin and doing military activities at a training ground like riding a tank, throwing grenades from a trench and firing weapons while wearing Russian military gear. On 21 August the same year, the brothers were reported to counter-terror police by Conservative MP Alicia Kearns over the visit on concerns of breaking British foreign intelligence law.

=== Political party launch ===
Britain Restoring Underlying Values Party
- Abbreviation: BRUV
- Leader: Andrew Tate
- Founder: Andrew Tate
- Founded: 6 January 2025; 22 months ago
- Headquarters: 41 Belmont Avenue, Barnet, Hertfordshire, England, EN4 9JP
- Political position: Far-right
- Colours: Dark blue

Website
- www.votebruv.co.uk

In January 2025, Tate said on Twitter he was launching a political party, the Britain Restoring Underlying Values Party (a backronym of BRUV). The party website stated, "This is a war to reclaim Britain. No excuses, no compromises, no second chances. We will defend our borders, crush crime, purge corruption, and restore pride to a nation under siege."

The launch was widely ridiculed on social media, with one Twitter user describing its manifesto as a "mix of North Korea and homoeroticism" while another described the party as the "very worst idea in the history of British politics". Some speculated that it was a PR stunt, but Tate said, "I am 100% serious. I am in the next election". The party's Twitter account was suspended, then restored after Tate complained to Elon Musk.

The party manifesto pledged to "restore the once-Great Britain." It said Tate would step down as prime minister if his policies were not implemented within 45 days. The platform included: a 24/7 broadcast showing knife crime prisoners serving life sentences in solitary confinement; opposition to rescuing migrants crossing the Channel; net-zero immigration; weekly referendums; a Department of Assistance & Development for Domestic Youth (DADDY), for aid, education, and development of British youth.

== Reception ==
Beginning in 2022, Tate's views and their influence on teenage boys and young men have become a particular concern of parents, teachers and mental health experts in much of the world, including North America, the United Kingdom, Australia, and New Zealand. The New York Times has described his views as "brainwashing a generation", due to his influence in British schools, and the Anti-Defamation League (ADL) considers Tate's misogyny mainstream, reporting that he "teaches his acolytes that women are inferior and morally deficient beings [...] who deserve to be physically, sexually and emotionally abused", and equating his philosophy to that of pickup artists.

A number of advocacy and research organisations condemned Tate's content in similar terms. The White Ribbon Campaign called his commentary "extremely misogynistic" and warned of "concerning" long-term effects on his young male audience; Hope not Hate said his presence risked becoming a "dangerous slip road into the far-right" for his audience and later called him a "legitimising force" for misogynistic views; and the Institute for Strategic Dialogue said he posed "a risk of radicalising young men into misogynist extremism". The Centre for Countering Digital Hate called videos of his viewed millions of times "extreme misogyny", and UK domestic abuse charity Women's Aid said his popularity was "a current representation of existing misogyny" rather than a standalone phenomenon. In response, Tate said his content includes "many videos praising women" and aims to teach his audience to avoid "toxic and low-value people as a whole", and that he plays a "comedic character" that people misunderstand.

=== Response ===
In February 2023, courses for teachers in the United Kingdom on how to address Tate's views sold out. Of what was called violent misogyny and other forms of extremist content that Tate distributes online, the head of UK counter-terror policing has said, "I'm concerned about the effect of that kind of rhetoric in the minds of young boys". In April 2023, the Department for Education (DfE) discouraged discussion of Tate, with many citing his influence regarding sexual harassment and misogynistic incidents. The co-founder of the charity Diversify expressed frustration over the refusal to provide any resources or training for teachers.

In October 2023, the Australian government allocated AUD$3.5 million (£1.8 million) to counter "harmful gender stereotypes perpetuated online" in response to young fans of Tate who have been described as "increasingly bringing misogynist views into Australian schools". According to researchers at Monash University Tate and other manosphere influencers have shaped the way boys treat women and girls and led students to openly espouse "male supremacist" views, to the extent that some Australian teachers have quit their jobs.

In February 2024, the Shadow Education Secretary in the UK, Bridget Phillipson, said the Labour Party wanted to use male role models to counter the misogyny of influencers such as Tate. The proposal would implement "peer-to-peer mentoring" programs for school staff to directly address the impact of Tate and others. The general secretary of the National Education Union, Daniel Kebede, welcomed the plans, saying, "schools would welcome more support on how to respond to the online sexism and sexual harassment".

=== Surveys ===
Several surveys have measured Tate's reach and influence among young people, particularly in the United Kingdom. A February 2023 Hope not Hate poll found eight in ten British males aged 16–17 had viewed Tate's content, with 45 per cent of British males aged 16–24 holding a positive view of him, compared to 1 per cent of British females aged 16–17. A September 2023 YouGov poll found 26–28 per cent of British men aged 18–39 agreed with Tate's views on women, though only 6 per cent of the 63 per cent of British adults who had heard of him held a positive view overall. A Women's Aid and ORB International survey the same month found 40 per cent of children aged 7–18 had heard of Tate, and that exposure to his content correlated with harmful perceptions of relationships, including being "five times more likely to think hurting people is OK". A February 2024 study by King's College London, the Center for Women's Global Leadership, and Ipsos similarly found only 6 per cent of UK adults held a favourable view of Tate, though one in five men aged 16–29 who had heard of him did.

A January 2023 survey of 500 teenage boys in Australia by "The Man Cave" found that 28 per cent looked up to Tate, and half of the 24 schools surveyed reported a "significant and negative impact" on their students.

=== Social media ===
An early YouTube channel Andrew and Tristan made was called the Hateful Tates. Tate became widely known in mid-2022 and was searched on Google more times than both Donald Trump and COVID-19 that July. In August, The Guardian reported that videos of Tate on TikTok had been viewed 11.6 billion times. In December 2023, Tate had over 8.5 million followers on X (Twitter), an increase of 5 million since December 2022. As of August 2024, Tate has 9.9 million followers on X. He was the third-most googled person in 2023, and his Wikipedia article was ranked among the top 25 English Wikipedia articles in 2023.

In December 2022, Tate addressed the environmentalist Greta Thunberg in a tweet extolling his carbon-emitting automobiles and asked for her email address to give her more information. Thunberg replied with the fake, satirical email address "smalldickenergy@getalife.com". The exchange received substantial attention on Twitter, with Thunberg's retort quickly becoming one of the most-liked tweets ever.

Avatar of Greta Thunberg

Greta Thunberg
Twitter
@GretaThunberg

yes, please do enlighten me. email me at smalldickenergy@getalife.com

28 December 2022

Avatar of Andrew Tate

Andrew Tate
Twitter
@Cobratate

Hello @GretaThunberg

I have 33 cars.

My Bugatti has a w16 8.0L quad turbo.

My TWO Ferrari 812 competizione have 6.5L v12s.

This is just the start.

Please provide your email address so I can send a complete list of my car collection and their respective enormous emissions.

December 27, 2022

Tate gained notoriety on social media for promoting a "hyper-masculine, ultra-luxurious lifestyle" and a "hyper-macho image". According to The Guardian in February 2023, Tate is popular among British teenage boys, who mimic his phrases and philosophies. It reported that "virtually every parent in Britain" had heard of him, and that parents and schoolteachers expressed concern that he was influencing boys to exhibit misogynistic and aggressive behaviour. In the UK and Australia, increased sexual harassment in schools has been attributed to Tate's influence.

In January 2023 the BBC reported that Tate and his brother had used social media to contact various young women in an attempt to get them to join their webcam business. A year later, the Center for Countering Digital Hate found that YouTube had earned up to £2.4 million in advertising revenue from Tate's content and accused YouTube of being "happy to continue to turn a blind eye". YouTube called the figure "wildly inaccurate and overinflated", highlighting that most channels are not monetised for such revenue.

==== Deplatforming ====
Three of Tate's Twitter accounts have been suspended at different times. In 2021, an account he created to evade his previous ban was verified by Twitter, contrary to its policies. The account was subsequently permanently banned, and Twitter said the verification occurred in error.

In August 2022, after an online campaign to deplatform him, Tate was permanently banned from Facebook and Instagram, losing 4.7 million followers from the latter. Their parent company, Meta, said he had violated its policy on "dangerous organizations and individuals". TikTok, where videos with Tate's name as a hashtag have been viewed over 13 billion times, also removed his account after determining that it violated their policies on "content that attacks, threatens, incites violence against, or otherwise dehumanises an individual or a group". Shortly thereafter, YouTube suspended his channel, which had 760,000 subscribers, citing multiple violations, including hate speech and COVID-19 misinformation. Tate later deleted his own Twitch channel, which had 50,000 subscribers. In November 2022, after Elon Musk acquired Twitter, Tate's Twitter account was reinstated.

Tate responded to the bans by saying that, while most of his comments were taken out of context, he took responsibility for how they were received. The YouTuber and boxer Jake Paul denounced Tate's sexism but characterised the bans as censorship. Tate's content continues to circulate on Facebook, Instagram, and TikTok via fan accounts. After the bans, Tate moved to the alt-tech platforms Gettr and Rumble, causing the latter to briefly become the most downloaded app on the Apple App Store.

== Personal life ==
In 2017 Tate and his brother moved from the United Kingdom to Romania, where they run multiple businesses. Tate said that he moved because he liked "living in countries where corruption is accessible for everybody" and believed he would be less likely to face rape charges in Romania. He said that Romanian police ask women reporting rapes for "evidence" or "CCTV proof", whereas in the Western world during the #MeToo movement any woman "at any point in the future can destroy your life". Tate reportedly has a number of children living in Romania whom he occasionally visits.

Tate was raised Christian but later became an atheist. By early 2022, he identified as a Christian again, and said that he tithed £16,000 to the Romanian Orthodox Church monthly. After a video of him praying at a mosque in Dubai went viral in October 2022, he stated that he had converted to Islam.

In March 2023, while incarcerated in Romania, Tate's legal team said that "he has a dark spot on his lung, most likely a tumor" following a medical consultation in Dubai, sparking online rumours about whether he has lung cancer. Tate later denied on Twitter that he had cancer.

In June 2025, it was reported that Tate had received citizenship of Vanuatu through the country's citizenship by investment scheme in December 2022. A spokesperson for Vanuatu's government later stated that they were "definitely looking into" revoking Tate's citizenship. Shortly thereafter, Vanuatu's citizenship office reviewed Tate's documents and found no fault with them. In September 2026, Vanuatu's government said that it had revoked Tate's citizenship and passport.

== Fighting record ==
=== Kickboxing record ===
Professional kickboxing record
76 wins (32 stoppages), 9 losses, 1 draw
Date	Result	Opponent	Event	Location	Method	Round	Time
2020-12-16	Win	Cosmin Lingurar	KO Masters 8	Bucharest, Romania	TKO (retirement)	2	2:02
2020-11-16	Win	Iulian Strugariu	RXF One Night 3 Show	Bucharest, Romania	TKO (punches)	1	0:49
2020-02-10	Win	Miralem Ahmeti	KO Masters 7	Bucharest, Romania	KO (left high kick)	1	0:58
2016-12-03	Loss	Ibrahim El Boustati	Enfusion Live 44	The Hague, Netherlands	TKO (Eye Injury)	1	N/A
For Enfusion Live World Cruiserweight Title −90 kg.
2015-03-14	Win	Jean-Luc Benoît	Boxe in Défi 16	Muret, France	Decision	7	2:00
2015-01-01	Win	Liang Ling	K-1 China vs. USA	Changsha, China	Decision	3	3:00
2014-06-29	Win	Wendell Roche	Enfusion Live 19	London, England	TKO	2	N/A
Wins Enfusion Live World Cruiserweight Title −90 kg.
2014-04-26	Loss	Miroslav Cingel	Enfusion Live 17, Semi-finals	Žilina, Slovakia	Decision	3	3:00
2014-03-15	Win	Cyril Vetter	Power Trophy 2014	Châteaurenard, France	KO	1 (12)	N/A
Defended ISKA World Full-Contact Light Cruiserweight Title −84.6 kg.
2013-12-01	Win	Laszlo Szabo	Enfusion Live 11	London, England	Decision (unanimous)	3	3:00
2013-06-29	Win	Marlon Hunt	Enfusion Live 6	London, England	Decision (unanimous)	3	3:00
2013-03-30	Win	Marino Schouten	Enfusion Live 3	London, England	Decision (unanimous)	3	3:00
2013-03-09	Win	Vincent Petitjean	Power Trophy 2013	Châteaurenard, France	Decision (split)	12	2:00
Wins ISKA World Full-Contact Light Cruiserweight Title −84.6 kg.
2013-02-02	Win	David Radeff	Enfusion Live 1	Zwevegem, Belgium	Decision (unanimous)	3	3:00
2012-12-02	Loss	Franci Grajš	Enfusion 3: Trial of the Gladiators	Ljubljana, Slovenia	KO (knee)	1	N/A
For Enfusion 3 Tournament Championship Title, −85 kg.
2012-12-02	Win	Ritchie Hocking	Enfusion 3: Trial of the Gladiators, Semi-finals	Ljubljana, Slovenia	KO	1	N/A
2012-05-12	Loss	Sahak Parparyan	It's Showtime 56	Kortrijk, Belgium	Decision (unanimous)	5	3:00
For It's Showtime 85MAX World Title −85 kg.
2012-03-31	Win	Joe McGovan	The Main Event	Manchester, England	KO (three knockdowns)	1	1:23
2011-11-12	Loss	Vincent Petitjean	La 18ème Nuit des Champions	Marseille, France	Decision (unanimous)	8	2:00
For NDC Full-Contact title −85 kg.
2011-08-17	Win	Adnan Omeragić	Enfusion 3: Trial of the Gladiators, Quarter Final	Ohrid, North Macedonia	TKO (eye injury)	1	N/A
2011-08-12	Win	Sammy Masa	Enfusion 3: Trial of the Gladiators, First round	Ohrid, North Macedonia	KO	2	N/A
2011-06-05	Win	Jean-Luc Benoît	Pure Force 9	Luton, England	KO	8 (12)	2:00
Wins ISKA World Full-Contact Light Heavyweight Title −81.5 kg.
2011-03-19	Loss	Jean-Luc Benoît	Boxe in Défi 12	Muret, France	Decision	12	2:00
For Vacant ISKA World Full-Contact Light Heavyweight Title −81.5 kg.
2010-10-16	Win	Jamie Bates	History in the Making 4	Nottingham, England	KO (HeadKick)	8	N/A
2009-09-26	Win	Daniel Hughes	IKF Kickboxing	Bristol, England	KO	1 (10)	N/A
Wins IKF Full Contact British Cruiserweight Title −84.5 kg.
2009-05-16	Win	Scott Jenkinson	History in the Making 1	England	TKO	N/A	N/A
2009-04-25	Win	Paul Randall	Championship Kickboxing	Derby, England	KO	5	2:00
Wins ISKA English Full-Contact Cruiserweight Title.
2008-09-14	Win	Mo Kargbo	Absolute Adrenaline	Bournemouth, England	TKO	5	N/A
2008-07-12	Win	Ollie Green	International Kickboxing at the Circus Tavern	Essex, England	TKO	4	1:00
2008-05-11	Win	Lee Whitfield	IKF Pro & Amateur Kickboxing	Kent, England	Decision	6 (6)	2:00
2008-02-24	Loss	Luke Sines	IKF Pro & Amateur Kickboxing	Kent, England	Decision (unanimous)	5 (5)	2:00
2007-04-07	Loss	Scott Gibson	Golden Belt	Hove, England	TKO (overhand right)	4 (7)	0:37
For ISKA British Full-Contact Light Heavyweight Golden Belt Title −81.5 kg.
Legend: Win Loss Draw/No contest Notes

=== Mixed martial arts record ===
==== Professional record ====
Professional record breakdown
1 match	1 win	0 losses
By knockout	1	0

Res.	Record	Opponent	Method	Event	Date	Round	Time	Location	Notes
Win	1–0	Shane Kavanagh	KO (punches)	Ultimate Warrior Challenge 13	6 Jun 2010	1	3:00	Essex, England	

==== Amateur record ====
Professional record breakdown
5 matches	3 wins	2 losses
By submission	1	0
By decision	2	2

Res.	Record	Opponent	Method	Event	Date	Round	Time	Location	Notes
Win	3–2	Luke Barnatt	Decision (unanimous)	Ultimate Warrior Challenge 12	20 Mar 2010	3	5:00	Essex, England	
Loss	2–2	Reza Meldavian	Decision (unanimous)	Ultimate Warrior Challenge 4	2 Jun 2007	3	5:00	Essex, England	
Win	2–1	Matthew Wilkins	Decision (unanimous)	Ultimate Warrior Challenge 3	24 Feb 2007	2	5:00	Essex, England	
Loss	1–1	William Morley	Decision (unanimous)	Ultimate Warrior Challenge 2	4 Nov 2006	2	5:00	Southend-on-Sea, England	
Win	1–0	Lee Mayo	Submission (guillotine choke)	Ultimate Warrior Challenge 1	10 Jun 2006	2	1:05	Southend-on-Sea, England	

=== MF–Professional boxing record ===
1 fight	0 wins	1 loss
By decision	0	1

No.	Result	Record	Opponent	Type	Round, time	Date	Location	Notes
1	Loss	0–1	Chase DeMoor	MD	6	20 December 2025	Dubai Duty Free Tennis Stadium, Dubai, UAE	For MFB heavyweight title
