= Andrew Tate vs Chase DeMoor =

2025 crossover boxing match

The Fight Before Christmas
- Date: 20 December 2025
- Venue: Dubai Duty Free Tennis Stadium, Dubai, UAE
- Title on the line: MFB heavyweight title

Tale of the tape
Boxer	Andrew Tate	Chase DeMoor
Nickname	"King Cobra"	"The GOAT"
Hometown	Washington, D.C., US	Eatonville, Washington, US
Pre-fight record	0–0 (Boxing); 76–9–1 (32 KOs) (Kickboxing)	9–3–1 (7 KOs) (Note: On BoxRec, DeMoor's professional record is 5–2–1 (5 KOs) and his MF-professional record is 4–1 (2 KO).)
Height	6 ft 3 in (191 cm)	6 ft 5 in (196 cm)
Weight	199.5 lb (90 kg)	200 lb (91 kg)
Style	Orthodox	Orthodox
Recognition	Four time kickboxing world champion in Enfusion and ISKA full contact	MFB heavyweight champion

Result
- DeMoor defeated Tate via Majority Decision. (57–57 Draw, 58–56 DeMoor, 58–56 DeMoor)

Misfits Mania – The Fight Before Christmas was a MF–professional boxing event featuring Andrew Tate vs Chase DeMoor, a heavyweight match contested between American influencer Andrew Tate and American reality star Chase DeMoor for the MFB heavyweight title. The event took place on 20 December 2025 at the Dubai Duty Free Tennis Stadium in Dubai, UAE. DeMoor defeated Tate via majority decision.

== Background ==
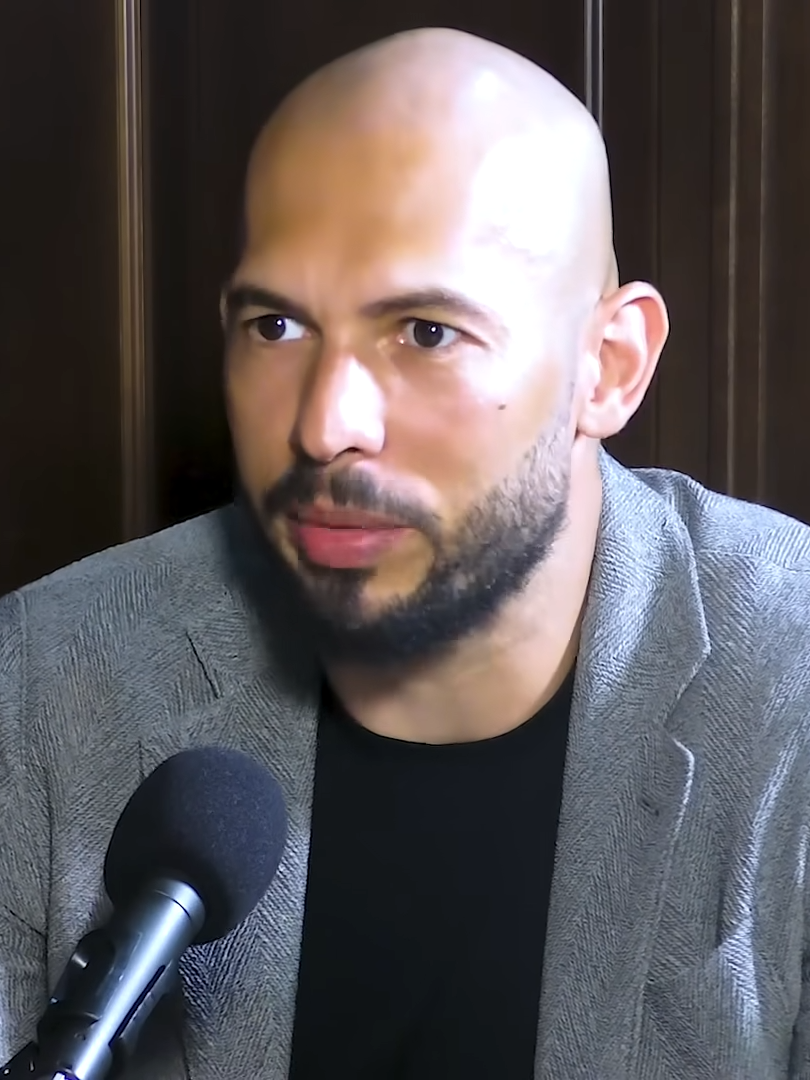
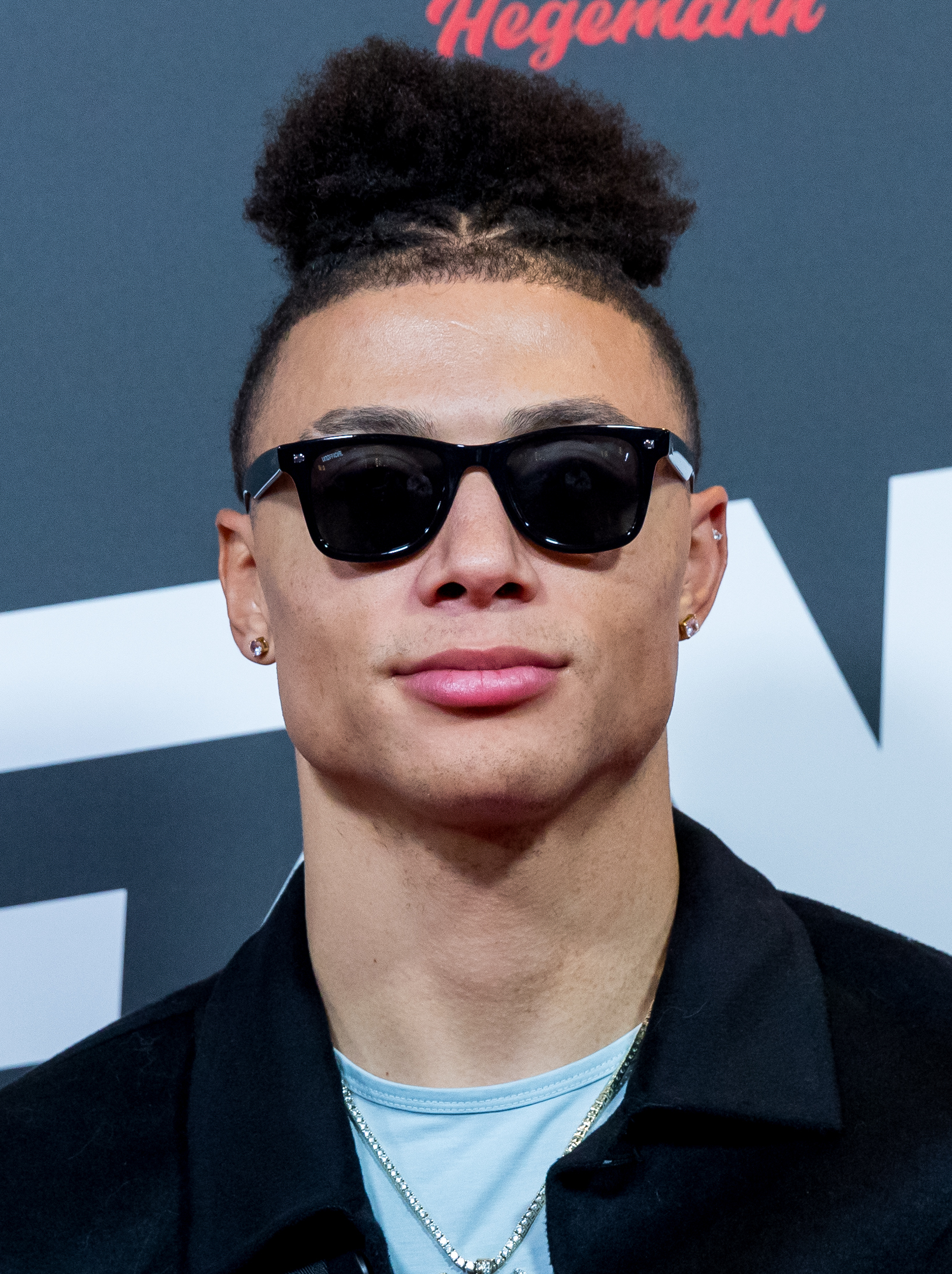
Andrew Tate (left) and Chase DeMoor (right).

=== Build up ===
In August 2025, Ariel Helwani broke the news that Misfits Boxing and controversial influencer Andrew Tate were in advanced talks for Tate to compete in a heavyweight bout by the end of the year. However, a day later BBC Sport contacted DAZN and were informed that Tate was in fact not in negotiation with Misfits despite the earlier reports. Misfits declined to comment. On 15 October, MF Pro newest signee David Lopez revealed that he would make his Misfits debut on a currently unannounced event scheduled for 20 December in Dubai, UAE. That same day, the Daily Mirror reported that Tate was set to debut against MFB heavyweight champion Chase DeMoor on the Dubai Misfits 23 event in December. On 19 October, Misfits officially announced the event set for 20 December with the billing "The Fight Before Christmas", a nod to the 1993 animated film The Nightmare Before Christmas. On 30 October, Tate vs DeMoor was officially announced and set for the MFB heavyweight title accompanied with a promotional video claiming that Tate had replaced KSI as the new CEO of Misfits.

On 3 November, Mams Taylor confirmed that Tony Ferguson would be unifying his interim MFB middleweight title, and Dillon Danis would be defending his MF MMA light heavyweight title on the undercard. On 5 December however, Misfits announced that Danis had withdrawn from the bout after not being medically cleared to compete following an altercation involving UFC Welterweight Champion Islam Makhachev's team at UFC 322.

On 4 December, the official broadcaster was announced as Rumble Premium, marking the first event outside of DAZN for Misfits.

=== Post fight ===
DeMoor defeated Tate after six rounds via majority decision (57–57, 58–56, 58–56), retaining his MFB heavyweight title and earning his third title defense in 2025. Following the event, KSI took to social media celebrating DeMoor's victory. Tate's defeat was mocked online and became a meme.

Helwani stated that Tate's defeat was the biggest "fraud check" of the year. American singer SZA left a comment on an Instagram post celebrating both Tate's defeat by DeMoor and Jake Paul's defeat by Anthony Joshua.

== Controversies ==
The announcement regarding Tate vs DeMoor sparked controversy among boxing audiences due to Tate's legal affairs. Misfits' co-president Mams Taylor stated on The MMA Hour: "I don't want to platform anyone I think is a truly evil person or anything like that. And I just don't think that any of those things are true about him."

On 19 December during the press conference, British far-right activist Tommy Robinson got into an altercation with MF Pro boxer Ty Mitchel.

== Card ==
Weight class		vs		Method	Round	Time	Notes
Main Card (Rumble Premium)
Heavyweight	Chase DeMoor (c)	def.	Andrew Tate	MD	6		^{Note 1}
Middleweight	Tony Ferguson (ic)	def.	Warren Spencer	UD	5		^{Note 2}
Lightweight	Amado Vargas	def.	Deen the Great	UD	6
Middleweight	Neeraj Goyat	def.	Anthony Taylor	UD	6
Welterweight	Ben Williams	def.	NichLMAO	UD	5
Middleweight	Amir Anderson	def.	Joe Laws	TKO	2/8	2:43	^{Note 3}^{,} ^{4}
Preliminary Card (Rumble and YouTube)
Middleweight	Pearl Gonzalez	def.	Tai Emery	UD	5		^{Note 5}
Welterweight	David Lopez	def.	Luis Garcia	TKO	2/8	2:25	^{Note 6}^{,} ^{7}
Lightweight	Carla Jade (c)	def.	Taylor Starling	SD	5		^{Note 8}
Middleweight	Sultan Babakhanov	def.	Antonio Siesmundo	TKO	1/4	1:30	^{Note 9}
Super welterweight	Jak Corrie	def.	Yaroslav Mazharov	TKO	1/6	2:50	^{Note 10}

^Note 1 For MFB heavyweight title
^Note 2 For vacant MFB middleweight title
^Note 3 Professional bout
^Note 4 For inaugural MF pro middleweight title
^Note 5 For vacant MFB women's middleweight title
^Note 6 For inaugural MF pro welterweight title
^Note 7 Professional bout
^Note 8 For MFB women's lightweight title
^Note 9 Professional bout
^Note 10 Professional bout

== Broadcast ==
This marked the first event under Misfits Boxing to not be broadcast on DAZN.
