= Matt Shea (filmmaker) =

American documentary filmmaker

- Shea in 2026
- Born: 16 December 1991 (age 34)
- Occupations: Producer, film creator and editor

Matt Shea is an British documentary filmmaker, journalist and presenter. He is known for the VICE documentaries Iceman, Targeted Individuals, The Pink Cocaine Wave, Ravers Vs. Putin, and The Last Festival on Earth. He produces and presents High Society, a documentary series that explores drug culture in the UK and features access to real criminals. Shea's documentaries often feature "crime and fringe stories".

== Career ==
Shea started his career writing for VICE Magazine.

As VICE moved into digital, broadcast and feature documentaries, Shea produced a number of films and series including Gaycation, which featured the actor Elliot Page, and Chemsex.

He also directed the feature-length documentary Time To Die, which was filmed over four years and covers the illegal underground global network that illegally sources, buys, and sells assisted-dying methods.

Shea was the first journalist to gain access to the Albanian Mafia and Colombian Clan Del Golfo Cartel for the Channel 4 documentary A New Cocaine Mafia.

His documentary about Wim Hof led to a global surge of interest in the Wim Hof Method.

Shea has also produced drug programming for Netflix and Channel 5, producing Channel 5's Britain's Cocaine Epidemic and Netflix's Dope.

He produced a documentary about the famous fraudster and sex party organiser Lord Edward Davenport.

Shea's special report for VICE about Andrew Tate, called The Dangerous Rise of Andrew Tate, was released on VICE and other platforms across the world in January 2023 and BBC iPlayer in the UK on 11 February.

=== Presenting ===
As a presenter, Shea is best known for his films about crime and drugs, such as the High Society series. In Inside the Laughing Gas Black Market, Shea met criminals who broke into hospitals in order to steal canisters of the recreational drug nitrous oxide. How Weed Laws Are Failing the UK portrayed new trends in the cannabis black market including groppers (grandmothers who grow cannabis because they are seen as less suspicious) and gangs using heat-seeking drones to find and rob rival cannabis grow operations.

In The Truth About Ecstasy, Shea witnesses students manufacturing ecstasy tablets in Brighton, and visits the first ever on-site drug-testing at a UK music festival.

Shea has also met Wim Hof, embedded with targeted individuals, and covered competitive gaming in South Korea.

== Awards ==
- 2015 – Webbie Award for Best Web Personality/Host 2015 for Iceman
- 2015 – Grierson Award – nomination – for Chemsex
- 2016 – Emmy Award – nomination – for Gaycation
- 2019 - Fragments Festival Best Feature - winner - for Time to Die
