= Legal affairs of the Tate brothers =

Legal issues of Andrew and Tristan Tate

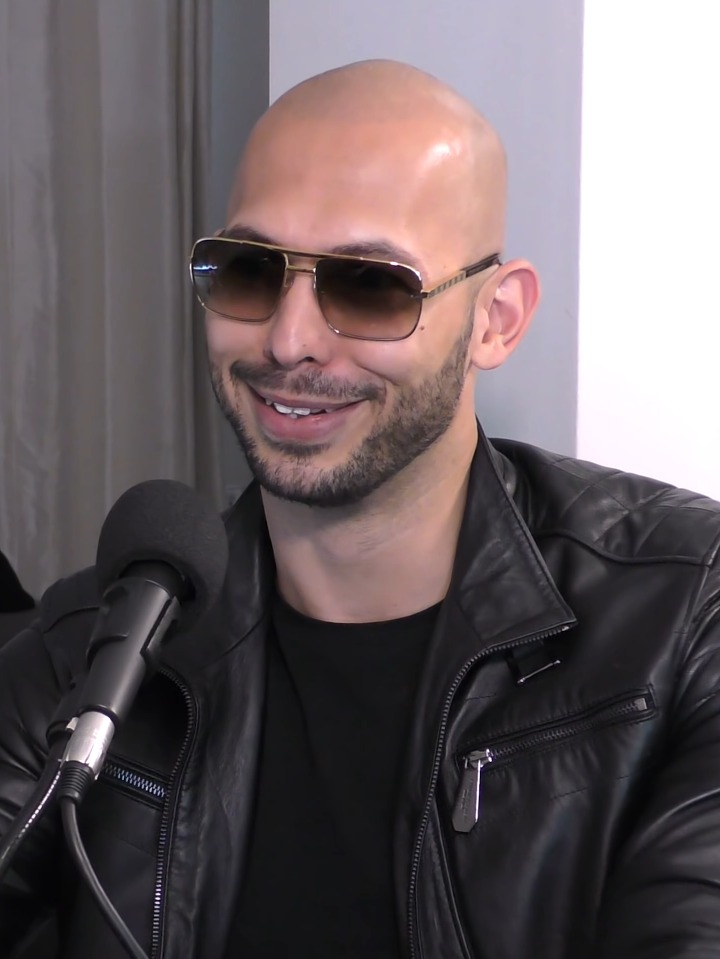
Andrew Tate in 2021

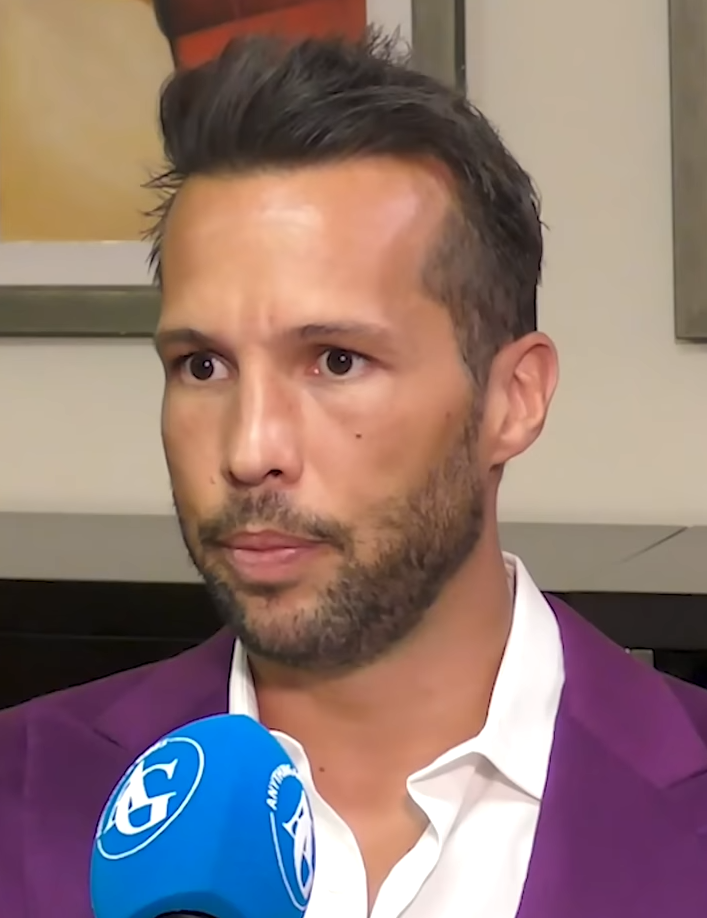
Tristan Tate in May 2025

The British-American social media influencer Andrew Tate and his brother, Tristan Tate, have both been involved in a number of criminal and civil legal affairs in relation to their joint business and personal activities. As of October 2025 they are facing six legal investigations—four criminal and two civil—in Romania, the United Kingdom and the United States. In response, they filed two lawsuits against their accusers in the US. Andrew also faces an additional civil case in the UK. The brothers have denied all charges and allegations.

In December 2022, the brothers were arrested in Romania along with two women. In June 2023, all four were charged with rape, human trafficking and forming an organised crime group to sexually exploit women. In July two of their accusers reportedly went into hiding after a campaign of online harassment, and the brothers filed a defamation lawsuit, claiming 5 million USD in damages against one of the accusers.

In March 2024, British police obtained an arrest warrant for the brothers, and in May 2025, the Crown Prosecution Service brought 21 charges against the Tates, including rape, actual bodily harm and human trafficking. In July 2024, a civil case in the UK began against the brothers and a third person for alleged tax evasion. A month later, Romanian police raided four properties Andrew owns and expanded its investigation to include trafficking minors, sex with a minor, money laundering and attempting to influence a witness. In July 2026, both brothers were arrested by US Marshals in Miami, acting on a sealed warrant from the UK. They are jailed in Florida as of Q3 2026, and they appeared in court as late as 27 August. As of September 2026, the Tate brothers are indicted in Romania, and "there is no trial on the calendar", according to a media outlet.

== Criminal cases ==
=== Romania ===
On 11 April 2022 the US embassy received a report that an American citizen was being held against her will in a property the brothers own in Pipera, Romania. Romanian police raided the home and a nearby webcam studio belonging to the Tates, where they discovered four women. Two of them, the American and another Romanian woman, told the police they were being held against their will, sparking an in-rem (Note: Meaning, "for the facts") investigation into human trafficking and rape by the Directorate for Investigating Organized Crime and Terrorism (DIICOT). The brothers were interrogated and released. At the time, they were heard as witnesses rather than suspects.

The criminal case in Romania has not ended, as of late July 2026.

==== Arrests, investigations and asset seizures ====
On 29 December 2022 the police arrested the brothers and two women. All four are suspected of human trafficking and forming an organised crime group, and one of them (unidentified, per Romanian law) is suspected of rape. DIICOT accuses the Tates of having recruited women through the "loverboy" method—which consists of misrepresenting one's intention to commit to a romantic relationship—and forcing them to create explicit content for websites like OnlyFans as part of an organised crime group the Tates are alleged to have formed in early 2021. DIICOT identified six potential victims.

Social media rumours attributed Andrew's arrest to pizza boxes from the Romanian restaurant chain Jerry's Pizza shown in a video addressed to Greta Thunberg replying to a tweet she had made at his expense. These rumours were denied by Romanian authorities; a spokesman for DIICOT described the rumours as "funny" but untrue.

In April 2023, the brothers filed criminal complaints in Romania against two witnesses in the case. The witnesses' lawyer characterised this as intimidation, and the lawyer noted that the witnesses had received death threats.

As of 5 January 2023 two potential victims had joined the case as civil parties and filed statements against the suspects. On 7 January 2023 one of the Tates' lawyers said the defence team had still not obtained a copy of the evidence the prosecution presented to the judge. The lawyer also stated that the court had not provided the Tates with an accurate translation during their 30-day extension hearing. He requested the opportunity to confront the accusers in court and said that some of the six alleged victims DIICOT identified had not filed a complaint against the Tates. Two women who have lived with the Tates have publicly defended them, and two of the six alleged victims DIICOT identified have denied that they were victimised.

Romanian authorities seized 29 assets, including 15 cars, more than 10 properties, watches, and sums of money, that belonged to the Tates or their companies, totalling almost US$4 million. If the Tates are convicted, these assets will be forfeited to the state and used to pay civil and moral damages to any victims. On 14 January 2023, the cars at the Tates' home were transported to a storage location. On 11 December 2023, a Romanian court rejected a request to return assets seized during the investigation. On 8 January 2024, the Bucharest Court of Appeal overturned this decision on appeal and ordered a new trial over the seized assets.

On 21 August 2024 Romanian police expanded their investigation against Andrew to include trafficking minors, sex with a minor, money laundering, and attempting to influence witnesses. DIICOT raided four homes belonging to Tate in Ilfov County and Bucharest in connection with new accusations and the criminal case of setting up an organised criminal group. The next day, Andrew and Tristan, whose property was also raided, were among six people taken into custody for allegations related to the raids. Both Romanians and foreigners were among those arrested. Prosecutors said the new investigation involves 35 alleged victims, including a woman who was a minor at the time. The accused are alleged to have made a total of $2.8 million via "sexual exploitation." The brothers have denied all the allegations.

==== Rape and human trafficking charges ====
On 13 June 2023 DIICOT adjusted the charges from human trafficking to "human trafficking in continued form," a more serious charge. One additional victim was identified, bringing the total to seven. On 20 June 2023, the four accused were indicted on charges of rape, human trafficking, and forming an organised crime group to sexually exploit women. They continue to deny all charges and remain under investigation for money laundering and trafficking of minors. Andrew's attorney argues that Andrew was playing an online character, while Andrew and his supporters have spread various conspiracy theories about the criminal charges.

Sky News reported that the allegations include committing "human trafficking in Romania and other countries," including the United States and the United Kingdom. ABC News reported that the case centres around three women—of American, Moldovan, and British nationality—who accuse the Tates of "luring [them] to Romania and exploiting them on webcam." According to the Anti-Defamation League, "Prosecutors allege that [Andrew] Tate raped at least one of the women repeatedly, controlled them by threatening them with violence and financial ruin and posted pornographic videos to the women's social media accounts."

In January 2024 the case was heard in the preliminary chamber before a trial date was set. In April 2024 a Romanian court ruled that all four defendants could be tried in the country without specifying a trial date. The Bucharest Tribunal decided that the case against Andrew "met the legal criteria." The defendants have appealed the ruling and have engaged in a legal strategy of delaying and drawing out the case. In November 2024 the Bucharest court ruled to remove certain pieces of evidence from the trial, including statements from the brothers and witness testimonies.

==== Pre-trial detention and restrictions ====
After an initial 24-hour pre-trial detention following the arrests on 29 December 2022, the judge prolonged their detention by 30 days. The Tates appealed the extension, but the appeal was rejected on 10 January 2023. Under Romanian law, it can be prolonged for a maximum of 180 days. On 20 January 2023, a Romanian court extended the brothers' pre-trial detention to 27 February 2023; the court's reasoning was based on a desire to safeguard the investigation and prevent the Tates from leaving the country. On 25 January 2023, while being taken for questioning at Romania's organised crime unit, Andrew said the case against him was "empty" and told reporters that "they know we have done nothing wrong."

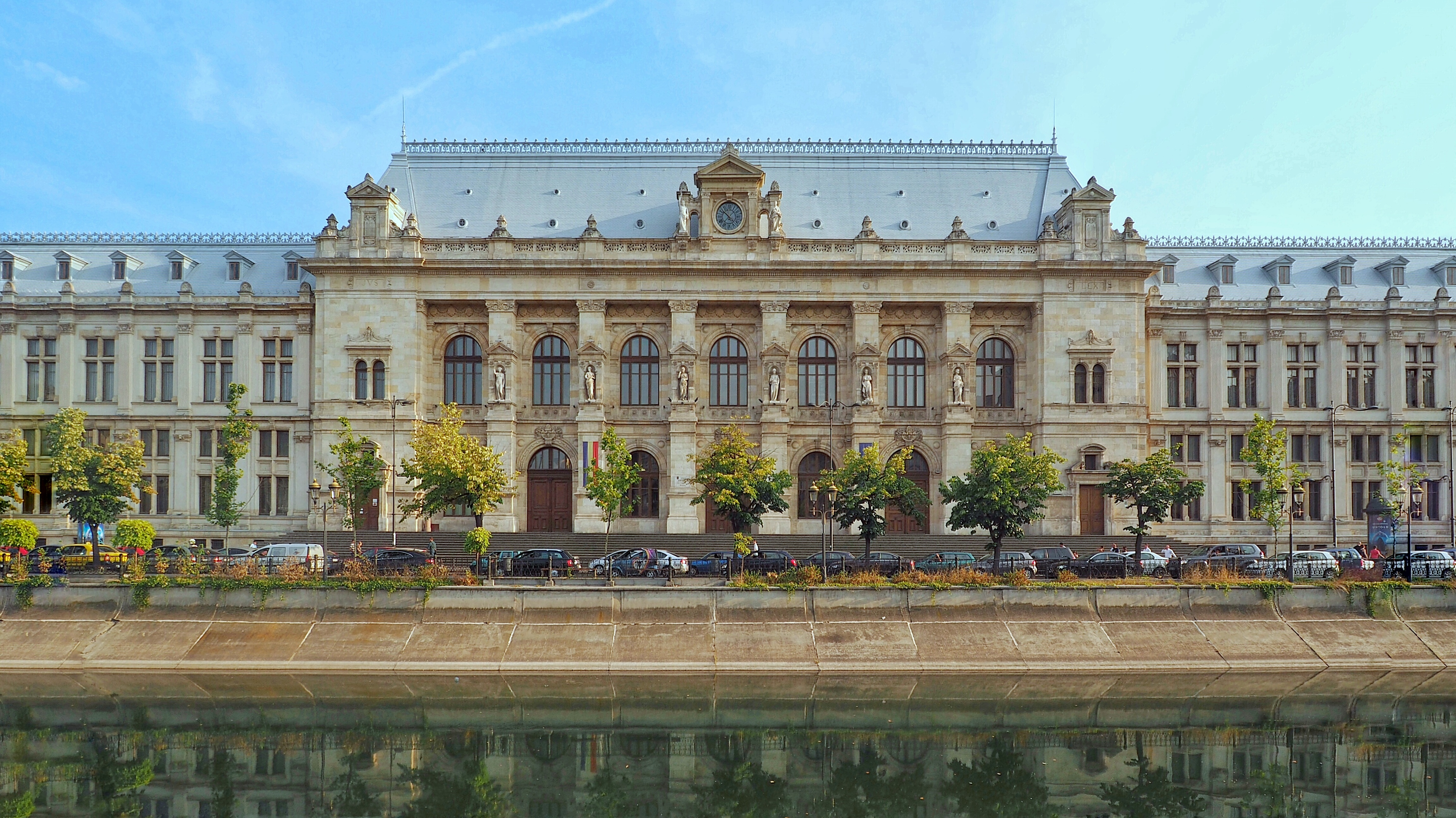
The brothers have appealed multiple times to the Bucharest Court of Appeal, located in The Palace of Justice (pictured). The court has overturned tribunal decisions and rejected other appeals.

On 1 February 2023, Andrew Tate appealed the decision to extend his detention. The Bucharest Court of Appeal rejected his appeal. That same day, Tina Glandian, a lawyer who previously represented Chris Brown and Mike Tyson, was added to the defence team. She released a public statement alleging that the situation constituted a "violation of international human rights." On 21 February 2023 a Romanian judicial institution prolonged the brothers' detention for 30 more days. Prosecutors allege wiretaps of phone calls made by Andrew to two associates, instructing them to lobby two Romanian right-wing politicians, George Simion and Diana Iovanovici Șoșoacă, to support his release.

On 14 March 2023 their petition for bail was refused for the third time. On 29 March their detention period was lengthened until the end of April. On 31 March 2023 the Bucharest Court of Appeal overturned the previous court's decision, transitioning the brothers' pre-trial detention to house arrest, initially set until 29 April and later extended to the end of August 2023. In total, the four suspects, including the brothers, were held in police custody from 29 December 2022 until 31 March 2023.

On 4 August 2023 their house arrest was replaced by judicial control until 2 October 2023, allowing the four to leave their house but not Ilfov County. On 28 September 2023 the travel restriction was relaxed after an appeal, allowing Andrew to travel within Romania. The decision was overturned on appeal, but restrictions were again relaxed by a judge on 28 November 2023.

On 30 January 2024 the Bucharest Court of Appeal rejected Tate's appeal to relax judicial control measures after pre-trial restrictions imposed on 18 January 2024 were extended another 60 days. The restrictions determine that he cannot leave the country. On 10 May the Bucharest Tribunal extended the same travel restrictions another 60 days, and on 20 May 2024 Andrew lost his appeal in the Bucharest Court of Appeal to have the restrictions relaxed. On 5 July 2024 a Bucharest court announced that the brothers were no longer restricted to travel only within Romania. The travel restriction was lifted, allowing the brothers to travel freely within the EU. The Bucharest Court of Appeal reversed that ruling on 16 July 2024.

On 21 August 2024 the brothers were held for questioning as part of a new investigation against them. A hearing was held at which a Romanian judge placed Andrew under house arrest for at least 30 days amid new allegations of human trafficking and sexual intercourse with a minor. The arrests came one day after Romanian police raided his home in the country. Tristan was placed under judicial custody.

On 5 September 2024 the Bucharest Court of Appeal turned down prosecutors' request to jail Andrew, keeping him under house arrest. Tristan was allowed to be kept in judicial custody, but he and Andrew were allowed to communicate with the alleged victims they have children with and who deny the allegations against them.

On 27 February 2025 various news outlets reported that the Tates had left Romania for the United States via private jet, with Romanian sources reporting that they were headed for Florida. This came after voices in the Trump administration, including Ric Grenell, the Special Presidential Envoy for Special Missions of the United States, supported the Tates. DIICOT later issued a statement, making clear the Tates still face their case in Romania but had been granted their request to be able to leave the country. They will be expected to return to Romania at a later date to satisfy the terms of their "under judicial control," which has not ended.

Upon arriving in Florida, the Tate brothers had their electronic devices seized by officials from the US Customs and Border Patrol. Days later, White House official Paul Ingrassia intervened, telling the Department of Homeland Security to return the devices, and noting in writing that the request came from the White House.

On 6 April 2026, a Romanian court lifted all remaining judicial control measures on Tate and his brother, removing requirements such as regular police check-ins, while the investigation into alleged human trafficking and related charges continued.

==== Other ====
When driving in Romania in June 2025, Andrew Tate was given a £310 ticket and had his licence suspended after speeding at 196 km/h (122 mph) in a 50 km/h (31 mph) zone.

=== United Kingdom ===
Andrew was first arrested in July 2015 after two women filed complaints accusing him of rape and assault in 2014. He was again arrested on suspicion of rape in December 2015 after an accuser presented messages from Andrew in which he wrote, "I love raping you." In response to the allegations, a spokesperson for Andrew said, "Andrew vehemently denies any involvement in criminal activities such as rape or physical abuse." In 2016, when Andrew appeared on the British reality show Big Brother's 17th series, Vice later reported that he was removed because the show's producers became aware of the investigation by Hertfordshire Constabulary into him for rape.

In 2019, after a four-year investigation, the Crown Prosecution Service (CPS) declined to file charges for any of the allegations of sexual violence and physical abuse, stating that the evidence "did not meet our legal test." The three women said the case was mishandled, with the police apologising for delays in the investigation; according to Tate, the police "found [exculpatory] messages from the girls' phones."

In March 2024 Westminster Magistrates' Court issued an arrest warrant against both brothers and requested their extradition. According to the Tates' representative, the charges are based on allegations of sexual aggression from 2012 to 2015. Bedfordshire Police said the warrant was "part of an ongoing investigation into allegations of rape and human trafficking" alongside Romanian authorities. The operation against the brothers was called Operation Moonwalk. Romanian police detained the two on 11 March 2024 after the prosecutor of the Bucharest Court of Appeal ordered them to be detained for a day until the court decided on the execution of the warrant. On 12 March 2024 the Romanian court ruled that the brothers can be extradited to the UK only after the Romanian trial for human trafficking concludes. The brothers "categorically reject all charges."

According to the lawyer representing the accusers, Matthew Jury, they received information that Andrew had told Adin Ross he planned to flee Romania, and requested British police have him detained. Jury also called on Piers Morgan and Tucker Carlson to no longer give Andrew a platform or otherwise to "properly interrogate him on the allegations," describing the spread of disinformation over the allegations in the UK and elsewhere as damaging.

In May 2025 the Crown Prosecution Service brought 21 charges against the Tates, including rape, actual bodily harm and human trafficking. Holborn Adams, the law firm representing the brothers, confirmed they would be returning to the UK to face the charges after Romanian legal proceedings.

In March 2026 the Hertfordshire Constabulary, whose investigations in 2015 led to Andrew Tate's first arrest, announced that they would be reinvestigating the reports of rape and sexual assault made in 2014 and 2015. This announcement was made a day after the Independent Office for Police Conduct (IOPC), an independent police watchdog organisation, announced that they would be investigating members of the constabulary for alleged misconduct and "failures to investigate properly" the criminal reports filed against Andrew.

In July 2026, the Tate brothers were both arrested in Miami by US Marshals under a sealed warrant from the UK. The UK Crown Prosecution Service announced they are seeking extradition of the brothers to the United Kingdom for pending charges, for Andrew Tate of "seven further counts of rape, three counts of arranging or facilitating trafficking for sexual exploitation, three counts of assault occasioning actual bodily harm and 19 additional charges for offences relating to indecent images of a child and extreme pornography", and for Tristan Tate "one count of sexual assault, two counts of rape and three counts of arranging or facilitating trafficking for sexual exploitation".

=== United States ===
==== Case regarding extradition to the UK ====
On 18 July 2026, the Tate brothers were arrested by US Marshals after an extradition request by UK authorities.

On 27 August 2026, "day One" of a hearing took place in federal court to determine whether the brothers will remain detained while extradition hearings take place. The brothers are detained as of September. The brothers have separate court cases, however they are sharing the same team of lawyers (as of Q3 2026). The judge is Lauren Louis.

On September 9, 2026, U.S. Magistrate Judge Lauren Louis denied the brothers request for release on bail, ruling that they had failed to demonstrate that they were not flight risks or dangers to the community or that special circumstances warranted their release. The brother remained detained while they contested extradition to the United Kingdom,

As of September 4, the prosecutors have a new filing; furthermore a media outlet said that "Tate Brothers' Romanian Trial Claim [is] Shredded".

The criminal case in Romania has not ended, as of Q3 2026. As of Q3 2026, the lawyers for the Tate brothers have not shown the U.S. federal court, "that an active, mandatory trial date [in Romania] even exists", according to a media outlet.

==== Criminal investigation ====
As of July 2026, the brothers are under "criminal investigation in the state of Florida", according to a media outlet. Earlier (March 2025), James Uthmeier, Florida Attorney General, initiated a criminal investigation into the Tate brothers following their arrival in Florida—a visit made possible by their travel bans being lifted, reportedly due to pressure placed from the Trump administration. The governor of Florida, Ron DeSantis, has expressed discontent with their unexpected appearance, declaring that they are unwelcome.

The brothers are possibly under a federal criminal investigation in the US (as of Q2 2025).

== Civil cases ==
=== United States ===
==== Defamation lawsuit in state court in Palm Beach County ====
In August 2026, the court granted Jane Doe (the counter-plaintiff), her motion to compel; that ruling is part of the discovery process in the Tate's civil defamation lawsuit; the Tate brothers have 30 days to comply with the court order; the ruling was made by Circuit Judge Joseph Curley, in Palm Beach County. Jane Doe is counter-suing the Tate brothers in regard to sex-trafficking and defamation.

Earlier (February 2023) the Tates' legal team confirmed that a cease and desist letter was sent to at least one of the accusers in December 2022, threatening to sue her and her parents for $300 million over alleged defamatory statements. A representative for the accuser said the brothers' threats in the United States were an attempt to stop the accuser's testimony in Romanian court. The brothers' legal team denied attempting to intimidate the accuser. Two of the accusers reportedly went into hiding after being targeted by an online harassment campaign, described as an attempt to "scare them into silence" by a "troll army." Senior legal counsel at the National Center on Sexual Exploitation, who are advising the women, alleges the Tates' following targeted her clients with thousands of online threats, including doxing the accusers and their relatives, as well as the use of private investigators.

In July 2023 the brothers filed a defamation lawsuit against one of the accusers, their parents and two other people in Palm Beach County, Florida, seeking $5 million in damages. The Tates claim the five conspired to falsely accuse them of human trafficking and rape, costing them their freedom as well as income from social media and business ventures. One of the other people was dropped from the case by the court, as the court had no jurisdiction over them. Palm Beach County Circuit Judge Joseph Curley allowed the brothers' lawsuit against the accuser to proceed in July 2024, while dismissing the allegations they made against her parents and some of the allegations they made against her.

==== Dismissed lawsuit (2024) ====
In January 2024 US District Judge Robin L. Rosenberg dismissed another of the brothers' defamation lawsuits. They had sued a former United States Marine Corps sergeant who reported Andrew to the US Embassy in Romania and military officials, leading to his arrest by Romanian authorities. Rosenberg ruled that the sergeant had assisted the authorities in their investigation and had done what the law encourages people to do against those they suspect of engaging in a crime.

=== United Kingdom ===
In May 2024 the three women involved in the investigation with Hertfordshire Constabulary, along with a fourth British woman, brought a civil case against Andrew in the High Court to sue for "injuries they suffered." Papers were served at his home in Romania. According to the women, the court granted them anonymity to protect them from harassment and abuse.

In July 2024 Devon and Cornwall Police began civil proceedings against Andrew, Tristan, and a woman referred to only as "J." The three are accused of paying no tax in any country for their online businesses, including Hustlers' University and War Room, amounting to £21 million in revenue between 2014 and 2022. The force is attempting to recover £2.8 million from several frozen bank accounts. In December 2024 Westminster Magistrates' Court ruled in favour of Devon and Cornwall Police, allowing them to seize around £2.5 million worth of unpaid taxes from the Tate brothers' online businesses. The chief magistrate said that the brothers' financial setup was a "straightforward cheat of the revenue" disguised as a "complex financial matrix."

== Complaint related to 2026 trip to Russia ==
In August 2026, Conservative MP Alicia Kearns referred Andrew and Tristan Tate to Counter Terrorism Policing and wrote to the Home Office regarding their June 2026 visit to Russia. Kearns cited a video in which the brothers participated in military-style training activities and argued there were grounds to examine whether they were required to register under the Foreign Influence Registration Scheme. A representative for the Tates stated that the visit was private and personal, denied any direction, payment or support from the Russian state, and described the referral as lacking evidential foundation. No charges have been announced.

== See also ==
- Law of Romania
- Human trafficking in Romania
- Human trafficking in the United Kingdom
