= United States Armed Forces Chess Championship =

The United States Armed Forces Chess Championship is a chess tournament held annually since 1960.

== U.S. Armed Forces Chess Championship ==
The first U.S. Armed Forces Chess Championship (USAFCC) was held in 1960, and continued uninterrupted through 1993. After 1993, the support of the U.S. Department of Defense was withdrawn. From 1994 through 2001, the American Chess Foundation and the U.S. Chess Center collaborated to host an open Swiss replacement event, the U.S. Armed Forces Open Chess Championship (USAFOCC).

When the Department of Defense resumed support of chess in 2001 with the Inter-Service Chess Championship, the military committee of US Chess took over the open Swiss which continues to be held each year as the U.S. Armed Forces Chess Championship.

=== Most frequent champions ===
IM Emory Tate won the Armed Forces Chess Championship five times in 1983, 1984, and three times in a row in 1987 through 1989. Robert Keough has also won five times in 1999, 2000, 2009; 2008 (tied), and 2013.

In 2018, Larry Larkins won his sixth Armed Forces Chess Championship.

=== Tournament champions since 1960 ===
#	Year	Winner	Notes
1	1960	Air Force Captain John Hudson and Army SP4 Arthur Feuerstein tied for 1st place.	The first U.S. Armed Forces Chess Championship (USAFCC) was held at the American Legion Hall of Flags in Washington, D.C. There were 12 invited participants. Feuerstein was four times New York state champion. Hudson was a bombardier-navigator on B-52 bombers and a former US Amateur champion.
2	1961	Captain John Hudson	The tournament was sponsored by the US Chess Federation, the American Chess Foundation, and the USO.
3	1962	SP4 Roy Mallett	
4	1963	Air Force Chief Master Sergeant Irwin Lyon	This was the first year that the Coast Guard was represented in this annual event.
5	1964	Air Force 1st Lieutenant Donato Rivera de Jesus	He played for Puerto Rico in the Varna Chess Olympiad in 1962.
6	1965	Air Force Airman David Lees (1943-1996)	He also won the Texas State Championship in 1965. The event was held at the American Legion's Hall of Flags in Washington, D.C.
7	1966	Army SP4 Chester Wozney	
8	1967	Army SP4 Michael Senkiewicz	He was also a world class Scrabble player, backgammon player, and poker player. He played for the British Virgin Islands in the 1988 chess Olympiad, scoring 9 out of 12. He was once ranked 35th in the nation in chess.
9	1968	Army Private First Class Charles "Charlie" Powell (1944-1991)	He was 7-time Virginia champion and beat Bobby Fischer in a simul.
10	1969	Army PFC Steven Hohensee	
11	1970	Air Force Major John Hudson	
12	1971	Air Force 1st Lieutenant Brendan Godfrey	Now Dr. Godfrey is Director of the Air Force Office of Scientific Research.
13	1972	Coast Guard Lieutenant Zaccarias Chavez	He appeared on the front cover of the December 1972 issue of Chess Life & Review.
14	1973	Air Force Sergeant Don Sutherland	He won the California State Chess Championship in 1965 and Colorado Championship in 1973.
15	1974	Air Force Sergeant Richard Bustamante	
16	1975	Air Force Sergeant Charles Unruh	
17	1976	Army E4 Russell Garber	
18	1977	Air Force Captain Robert Bond	
19	1978	Air Force Captain Robert Bond	The event was held at the American Legion Hall of Flags in Washington, D.C. The event was sponsored by the American Chess Foundation.
20	1979	Army SP4 Michael Fletcher	He is a national master.
21	1980	Army SP4 Michael Fletcher	
22	1981	Airman 1st Class Timothy Brown	He won the Arizona championship in 1976.
23	1982	Air Force Sergeant Timothy Brown	
24	1983	Air Force Senior Airman Emory Tate, Jr.	
25	1984	Air Force Sergeant Emory Tate	
26	1985	Army SP4 Roberto Rodriquez	
27	1986	Army Private Richard Russell	
28	1987	Air Force Staff Sergeant Emory Tate	
29	1988	Air Force Staff Sergeant Emory Tate	
30	1989	Air Force Staff Sergeant Emory Tate	
31	1990	Mario Murillo (Navy)	
32	1991	Mario Murillo (Navy)	
33	1992	Donato Lacno (Navy)	
34	1993	Air Force Sergeant Elvin Wilson	
35	1994	Robert Holling (Navy)	
36	1995	John Hanson and Brian Richardson tied for 1st	
37	1996	Army Captain David Hater	
38	1997	Army Major David Hater and Dwaine Roberts (Marines Corps) tied for 1st	
39	1998	Air Force Sergeant Elvin Wilson and Air Force Sergeant Peter Kurucz ties for 1st	
40	1999	Air Force Sergeant Robert Keough	
41	2000	Air Force Sergeant Robert Keough	
42	2001	Sgt Rudy Tia and Joseph Kruml tied for 1st	The tournament was held at Ft. Meyer.
43	2002	Sgt Rudy Tia	The event took place in San Diego, CA.
44	2003	Air Force Sergeant Leroy Hill	The tournament was held at Kelly AFB in San Antonio, Texas.
45	2004	Narcisco Victoria and West Point Cadet David Jacobs tied for first	
46	2005	West Point Cadet David Jacobs	The tournament was held in Arlington, Virginia.
47	2006	West Point Cadet David Jacobs	The tournament was held at the US Armed Forces Retirement Home in Washington, DC. Retired USAF Lt. General William Earl Brown, a chessplayer who was in one of the Tuskegee Airman graduating classes in the late 1940s, was a special guest and speaker.
48	2007	Navy retiree Larry Larkins	The tournament was held in Arlington, VA from October 6-8.
49	2008	Larkins, Taffinder, Keough, Pabalan, and Szpisjak tied for first	The tournament was held in Bethesda, MD.
50	2009	USAF TSgt Robert Keough	The tournament was held at Gettysburg, PA.
53	2012	Dan Ranario (2128)	The tournament was held on board the USS Wasp in Norfolk, Virginia. This was the first time the event was held on a ship.
54	2013	Dan Ranario, Robert Keough, Gordon Randall, and Jon Middaugh tied for first	The tournament was held at the U.S. Army Transportation Museum at Fort Eustis, Virginia.
55	2014	US Army Nicholas Oblak	The tournament was held at the Air Force Academy in Colorado Springs.
56	2015	Navy retiree Larry Larkins	The tournament was held at Fort Belvoir, Virginia USO Center from October 10-12.
57	2016	Navy retiree Larry Larkins	The tournament was held at US Naval Academy, Annapolis, MD.
58	2017	Leroy Hill, Jr. (USAF, Retired)	The tournament was hosted at the United States Military Academy at West Point, and sponsored by the US Chess Trust and US Chess president, Mike Hoffpauir, a former US Army brigade commander. Hill also won the Inter-Service Championship in 2003.
59	2018	Navy retiree Larry Larkins	Larry Larkins won on tiebreaks. The tournament was held at Joint Base Andrews, MD.
60	2019	Air Force 1st Lieutenant and National Master Eigen Wang	The tournament was held at Camp Lejeune, NC.
61	2020	Navy Second Class Petty Officer Andrew Peraino	The tournament was held in Virginia Beach, VA.
62	2021	Airman 1st Class Charles Unruh	Unruh won the tournament in Grapevine, Texas, October 8-11, 2021.
63	2022	U.S. Military Academy Cadet Addison Lee	Lee won the tournament on Joint Base McGuire-Dix-Lakehurst, NJ, October 8-10, 2022.
64	2023	U.S. Military Academy Cadet Peter Jackson	
65	2024	US Air Force Academy Cadet Christopher Shen	
66	2025	US Military Academy Cadet Addison T Lee	

== Inter-Service Chess Championship ==
In 2001, the U.S. Department of Defense resumed support of chess in the US military and the US Armed Forces Chess Championship (USAFCC) was renamed the U.S. Inter-Service Chess Championship (ISCC).
