= Arthur Feuerstein =

American chess player (1935–2022)

Arthur William Feuerstein (December 20, 1935 – February 2, 2022) was an American chess master, and winner of the first U.S. Armed Forces Chess Championship in 1960. He represented the United States twice in FIDE Student Olympiads.

== Early life and education ==
In 1950, Feuerstein, then age 14, represented the US in the first World Junior Invitational tournament, held in Birmingham, England. This evolved into the first official World Junior Championship, held the next year, and ever since. At the time, Feuerstein was a student at William Howard Taft High School (New York City) in the Bronx, and had just begun playing chess a couple of years earlier. He represented his school in city scholastic play, both team and individual, and graduated in 1953. He began his college studies at Baruch College later that same year.

In 1956, Feuerstein tied for second at the USA Junior Championship in Philadelphia, won by Bobby Fischer; their individual game was drawn. At age 21, Feuerstein won the U.S. Junior Blitz Championship, leaving Fischer in a close second place. The game between them ended in a draw. Feuerstein had a record of (+1−1=3) against Fischer, Feuerstein getting a win against Fischer in the 1956 Greater New York City Open. That same year, Feuerstein, representing Baruch, was the top scorer on board one at the Pan American Intercollegiate Team Chess Championship, in Philadelphia.

== Good finishes in important events ==
Feuerstein scored 6.5/11, for a tied 3-4th place, in the 3rd Rosenwald Trophy tournament of 1956, in New York, which was the 'de facto' U.S.A. Championship; the event was won by GM Samuel Reshevsky. Then, in 1957-58, Feuerstein scored 6.5/13, for a shared 6-8th place, in the U.S.A. Championship, in New York, won by Fischer.

== Represents USA in team play, Armed Forces champion ==
In 1957, Feuerstein was selected, along with IM William Lombardy, Edmar Mednis, Anthony Saidy, and reserve Robert Sobel, to play in the Fourth World Student Team Chess Championship in Reykjavík, where the United States team took fifth place. Feuerstein, on third board, scored (+5, =1, -5). The following year, the same team was chosen to represent the U.S. again, in Varna, where they finished sixth. Feuerstein, on fourth board this time, scored (+5, =2, -2). He met his future wife Alice at this event.

Feuerstein joined the United States Army in 1958, following college graduation from the City University of New York's Baruch College, in business.

In 1960, the first United States Armed Forces Chess Championship was held at the American Legion Hall of Flags in Washington, D.C. There were 12 invited participants. Air Force Captain John Hudson and Army SP4 Feuerstein tied for first place. Hudson was a bombardier-navigator on B-52 bombers, and a former US Amateur champion. Feuerstein was stationed in Paris at this time.

Although Feuerstein was never awarded an international chess title, he did make two tournament scores at the New York title events, in 1956 and 1957–58, at or very near that level. His 1958 Varna result is also near that level. International chess ratings did not exist yet at the time he was making his best results, but the website chessmetrics.com, which rates historical events and players on a retrospective basis using formulae similar to those used for current calculations, assigns Feuerstein a rating of 2559 for June 1957, good for #86 in the world, and well within current IM standard. When FIDE ratings were introduced in 1970, Feuerstein had earned a rating in the 2350 range.

== Car accident, recovery, and later life ==
In 1973, Feuerstein was involved in a car accident that left him in a semi-coma for six weeks, unable to speak. When he awoke, he remembered how to play chess well, including his openings. He spent the next several years in intensive physical and speech therapy, but never fully recovered. He continued to play chess after the accident, and in fact was rated as one of the top 10 players in his age group in the world when he was 65 years old.

Feuerstein died in Mahwah, New Jersey on February 2, 2022, at the age of 86. He suffered from pancreatic and liver cancer prior to his death.
