= Gennadij Sagalchik =

Belarusian-American chess grandmaster (born 1969)

Personal information
- Born: April 22, 1969 (age 57) Minsk, Byelorussian SSR, Soviet Union
- Spouse: Olga Sagalchik

Chess career
- Country: Soviet Union → Belarus (before 1993); United States (after 1993)
- Title: Grandmaster (1994)
- FIDE rating: 2434 (October 2026)
- Peak rating: 2550 (January 1997)

Gennadij Germanovich Sagalchik (born April 22, 1969) is a Belarusian-American chess grandmaster and coach.

== Chess career ==
Sagalchik is a former Belarus Junior Champion, and was awarded the Grandmaster title in 1994. In 2008, he tied for second place with Sergei Tiviakov at the IV Torneo Internacional Abierto de Ajedrez in Alajuela, Costa Rica.

Sagalchik has been a chess coach in Long Island since the 2010s. In 2015, four of his students played in the World Youth Chess Championship.

== Personal life ==
Sagalchik lives in Brooklyn with his wife Olga, who is a Woman FIDE Master. They have two daughters and a son.
