= Embassy of the United States, Bucharest =

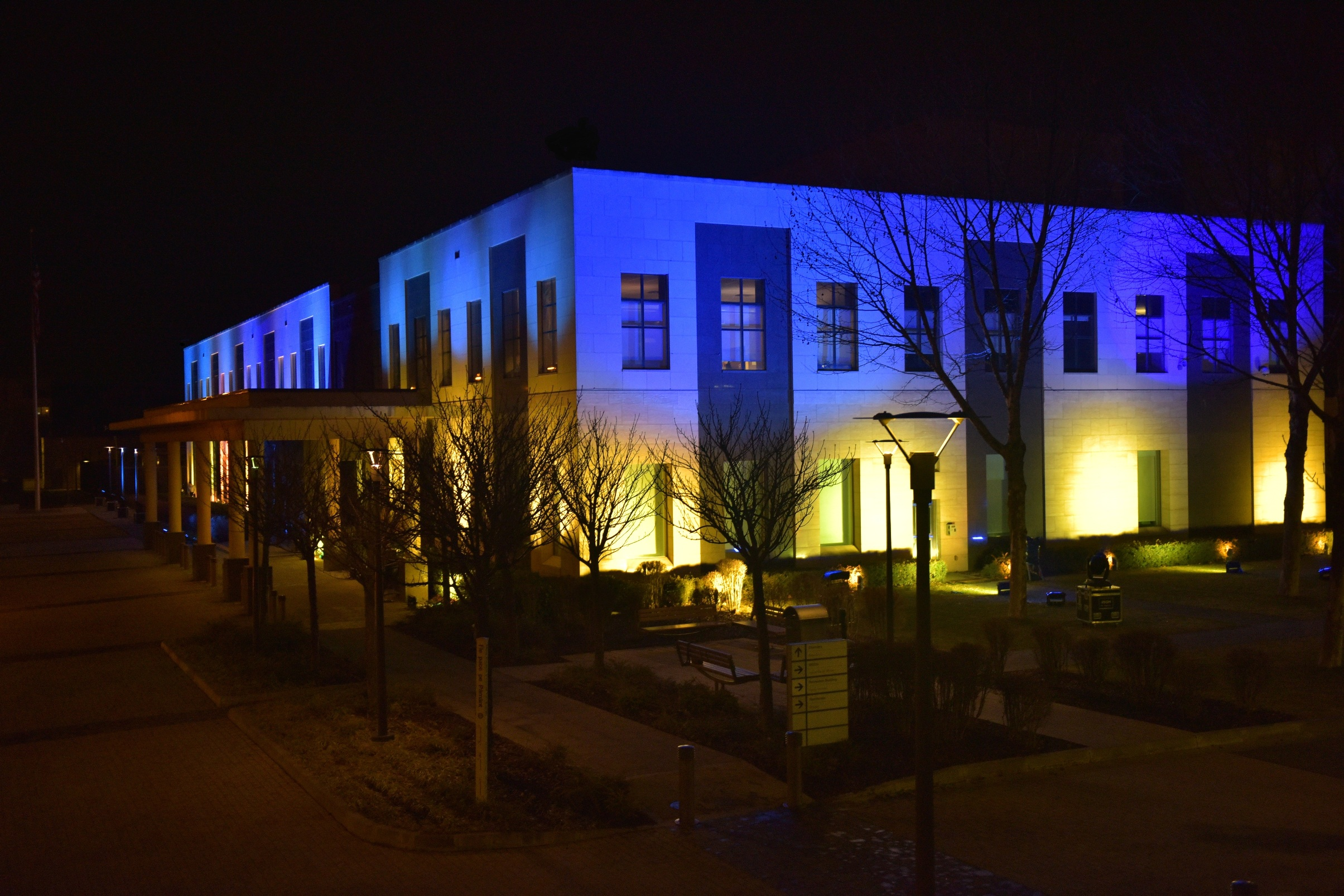
- US Embassy in Bucharest lit in Ukrainian colors, March 1, 2022
- Location: Bucharest, Romania
- Address: Bulevardul Doctor Liviu Librescu 4-6, Sector 1, București, Romania
- Coordinates: 44°30′54″N 26°5′13″E
- Opening: June 1, 1964; 62 years ago
- Relocated: September 14, 2011
- Ambassador: Darryl Nirenberg
- Website: ro.usembassy.gov

The Embassy of the United States in Bucharest is the diplomatic mission of the United States of America in Romania.

== History ==
The first diplomatic agent to Romania, Eugene Schuyler, was appointed in 1880 and subsequently reaccredited when Romania was declared a kingdom in 1881. The diplomatic ties were severed in 1941 during World War II and relations were reestablished in 1947.

The U.S. Legation in Bucharest was raised to Embassy status on June 1, 1964. On December 4, 1964, William A. Crawford was promoted to Ambassador. He presented his new credentials on December 24, 1964, and served until October 10, 1965.

For 70 years, the embassy was located at 9 Tudor Arghezi Street (near the Intercontinental Hotel), in a palace that once belonged to Mauriciu Blank. The embassy moved to its present location on September 14, 2011. The compound is located on a 4.5 hectares (11 acres) lot in the Băneasa district of the capital, on a boulevard named after Liviu Librescu. The area was part of a real estate development purchased under controversial circumstances by Gabriel Popoviciu, and where the Băneasa Shopping City and an IKEA store are also located. The building was designed and constructed by the American International Contractors, with help from several local construction firms, involving 1,500 Romanian specialists and workers overall. The embassy residential complex consists of nine buildings; the main building, made of concrete, has the appearance of a fortress or military barracks and is surrounded by high concrete walls.

In 2012, the United States dedicated the new embassy compound with an address from Beau Biden. In April 2022, Romanian authorities opened an investigation into Andrew Tate after officials at the U.S. embassy in Bucharest informed authorities about a U.S. citizen was being held involuntarily at a house in Ilfov County. In May 2022, U.S. First Lady Jill Biden visited the embassy to meet with Ukrainian refugees.

== See also ==
- Embassy of Romania, Washington, D.C.
- List of ambassadors of the United States to Romania
- Romania–United States relations
