= Bucharest Court of Appeal =

Appellate court in Bucharest, Romania

Coordinates: 44.4288°N 26.0990°E

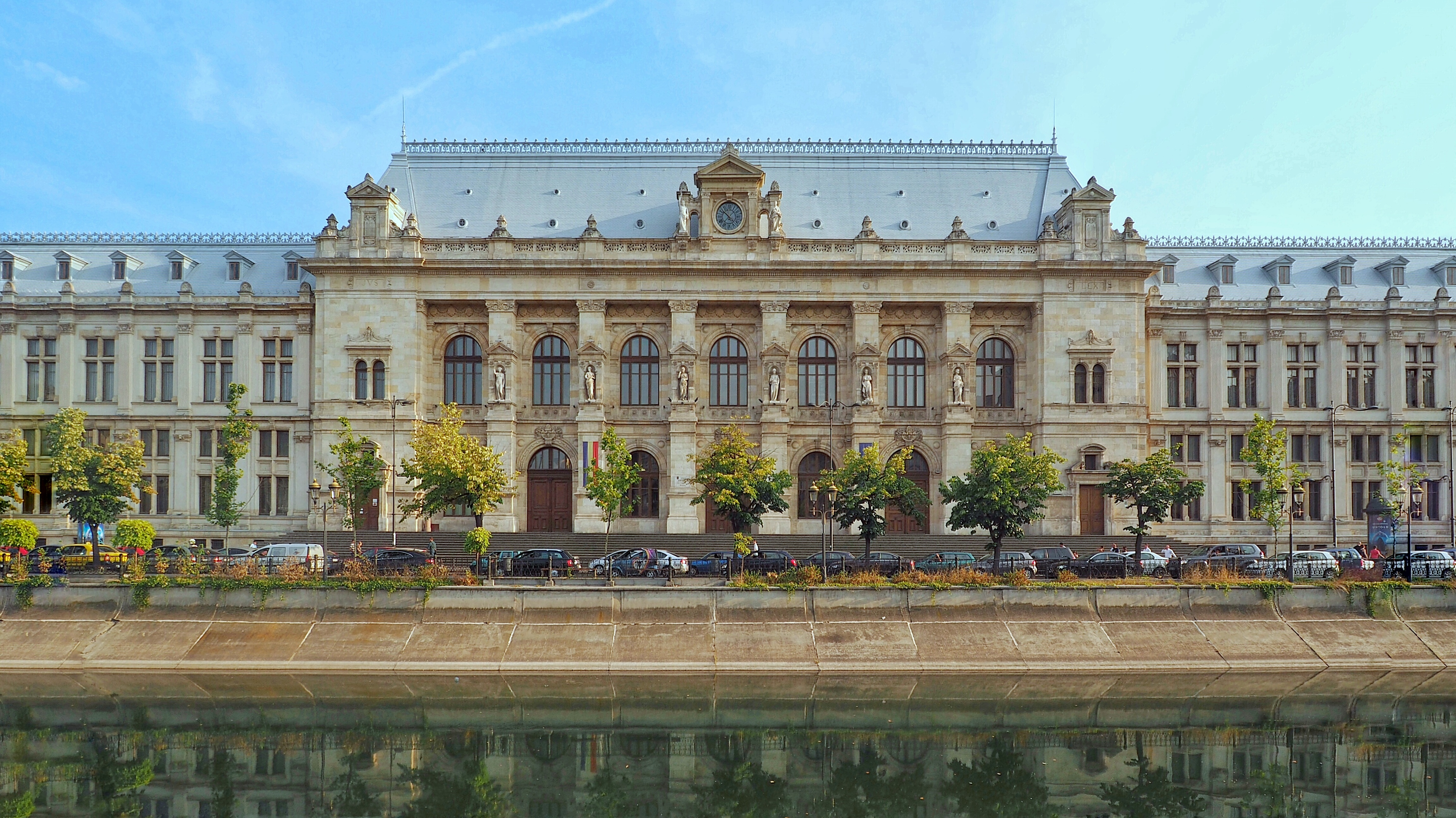
The Palace of Justice in Bucharest, location of the Bucharest Court of Appeal

The Bucharest Court of Appeal (Romanian: Curtea de Apel București) in Bucharest, Romania is one of the 16 appellate courts of Romania. It is located in the Palace of Justice, overlooking the Dâmbovița river in central Bucharest.

As of 2011, the court had 178 judges, 192 clerks and 49 salaried employees.
