= Posterior branch =

Posterior branch may refer to:

- Posterior branch of obturator nerve
- Posterior branches of sacral nerves
- Posterior branches of the lumbar nerves
- Posterior branch of coccygeal nerve
- Posterior branches of thoracic nerves
- Posterior branches of cervical nerves
- Posterior gastric branches of posterior vagal trunk
- Posterior ramus of spinal nerve
- Posterior septal branches of sphenopalatine artery
