= Belfie =

Butt selfie

Belfie (transl. butt selfie) is a self-portrait photograph or a short video of one's own Buttocks, a portmanteau of "butt" and "selfie," popularized around 2014 by fitness enthusiasts and celebrities like Jen Selter, Kim Kardashian. The trend led to the invention of the "Belfie Stick," a bendable selfie stick designed to help people capture these rear-end photos from behind.

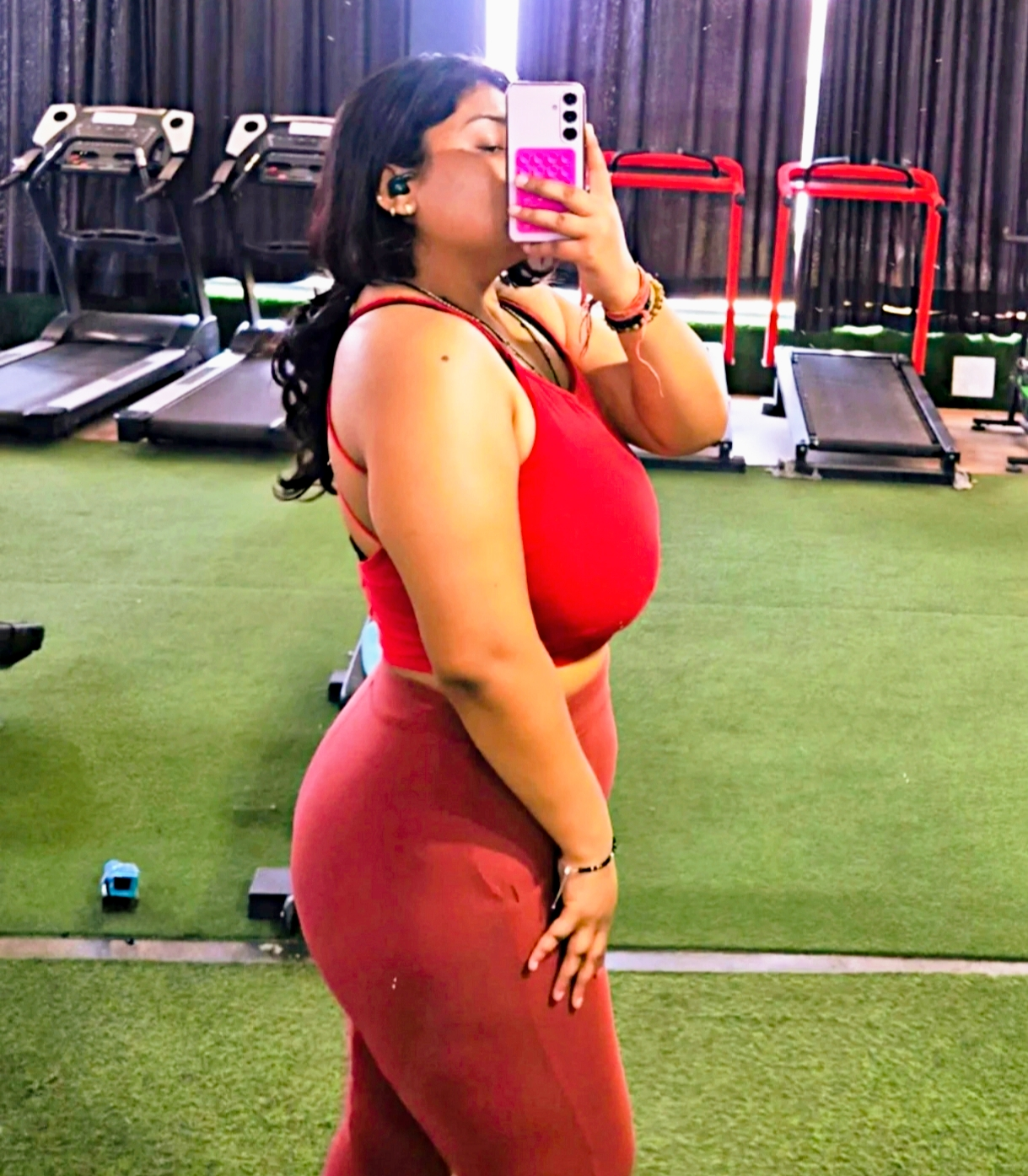
Belfie (Butt Selfie)

== See also ==
- 3D selfie
- Ballot selfie
- Imago camera
- List of selfie-related injuries and deaths
- Remote shutter
- Rooftopping
- Self-portrait
- Self timer
- Selfie studio
- Sleeveface
