= Kasbani Kasmon =

Singaporean model and actor

Kasbani Bin Kasmon
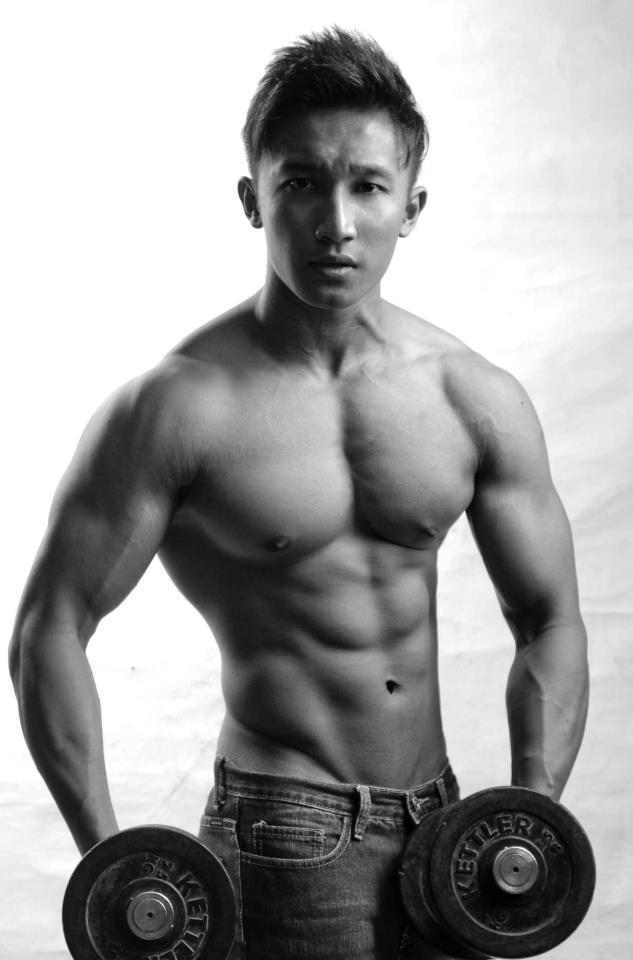
- Kasbani in 2012
- Born: Kasbani Bin Kasmon; 14 April 1989 (age 37); Singapore
- Years active: 2009–present
- Height: 5 ft 5 in (1.65 m)

Kasbani Bin Kasmon (born 14 April 1989), better known by his nickname, Que Andrea Kasbani, is a Singaporean fitness model and a cover model who has been featured in various magazines such as the Manja Magazine (Singapore), Mangga (Malaysia), Maskulin Magazine (Malaysia), REPS Magazine (Indonesia), Cosmopolitan Magazine (Singapore), SUTRA Magazine (Singapore) and Ifitness Magazine (Singapore) as well as on the fitness sutra website. Apart from modeling, Kasbani is also a freelance actor and has been featured on show such as BlogTv on ChannelNewsAsia and on Suria.

== Early life and education ==
Kasbani was born and raised in Singapore and is the eldest to his two other siblings.

After his secondary school, Kasbani pursued his education in visual communication (graphic design). Kasbani was awarded with a scholarship during his study and he graduated with a diploma in graphic design.

After completing national service, Kasbani continued his education at the Royal Melbourne Institute of Technology, Australia. He graduated and was awarded a bachelor of design (communication design) degree with distinction.

== Pageantry ==
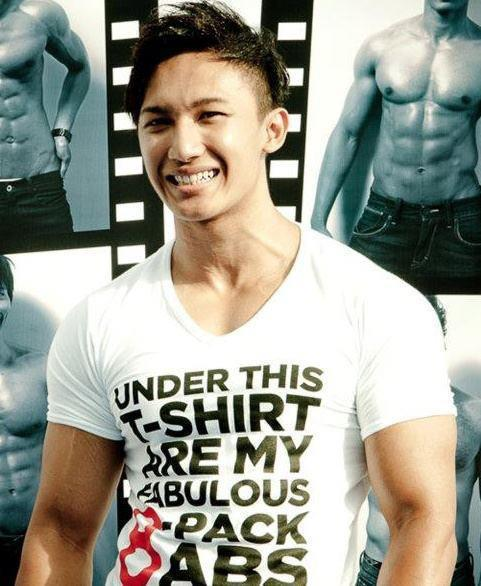
8 Days Magazine Shirtless Guy Search 2011

Kasbani has participated in numerous pageant contest and won titles such as 3rd Runner Up in Mister Singapore 2010, Singapore Best Abs in Manhunt Singapore 2010, and the winner for Mister Singapore South East Asia 2010. In the year 2011, Kasbani has participated in 8 DAYS Magazine Shirtless Guy Search and he won "Mr Social Butterfly" title and award by StarHub. In 2012, Kasbani also has participated Best Model of the World Singapore contest and he won "Mr Physique" title.

== Modeling career ==
Kasbani is a fitness model for magazines in Singapore, Malaysia and Indonesia. He was featured in Indonesia's front cover REPS Magazine in 2011 and 2012 and was named the top 7th fitness model in Indonesia by the magazine. Two Malaysia's magazines drew interest in him and he was featured in articles in Maskulin and Mangga.

In the year 2010, Kasbani was also featured as the most "hot single" by Manja Magazine in Singapore. Apart from magazines, Kasbani also appears in many other prints. He was Mr. January 2010 in the Singapore Calendar Guys 2010 and was featured as Hot Bod in local newspapers such as The New Paper, The Straits Times Urban and Berita Harian.

He became the sponsored athlete/fitness model and spokesperson for NutriFirst, one of Singapore's largest supplement online store, from the year 2009 to 2013.

== Bodybuilding career ==
In the year 2015, Kasbani was crowned the overall champion, national level, in the Men's Physique category. Kasbani represent Fitness Movement League ProTeam athlete. He became the first Men's Physique athlete in Singapore who has been commissioned by NspireSL his pro status.

In 2016, Kasbani retired from bodybuilding and opened a gym.

== Filmography ==
Apart from modeling, Kasbani is also a freelance actor and appears on television and in plays.

=== Film ===
Year	Title	Role	Notes	Ref
2010	Suria Projek Cerpen, 2010: HOTA (1 February 2010)	Bob (Drug Pusher)	Short film	

=== Television ===
Year	Title	Role	Notes	Ref
	Unnatural (Season 2, Episode 3)	Police Officer		
	Nora Wedding Concept 2	Hamdan (Staff Manager)		

=== Theatre ===
Year	Title	Role
2011	Dick Lee's Beauty King 2011	Hunk/Model
