= Medial cluneal nerves =

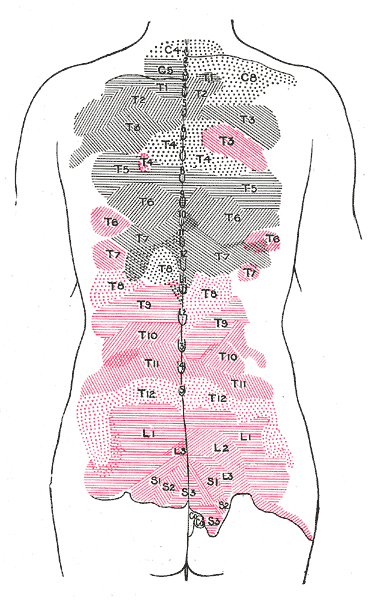
- Areas of distribution of the cutaneous branches of the posterior divisions of the spinal nerves. The areas of the medial branches are in black, those of the lateral in red.

- Cutaneous nerves of the right lower extremity. Front and posterior views. (Posterior div of sacral visible in pink at upper left.)

Details
- From: posterior branches of sacral nerves
- Innervates: buttocks

Identifiers
- Latin: nervi clunium medii
- TA98: A14.2.06.006
- TA2: 6509
- FMA: 75489

The medial clunial nerves innervate the skin of the buttocks closest to the midline of the body. Those nerves arise from the posterior rami of spinal sacral nerves (S1, S2, and S3).

== Additional images ==
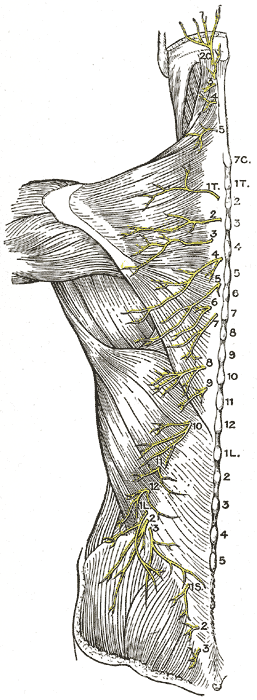
Diagram of the distribution of the cutaneous branches of the posterior divisions of the spinal nerves.
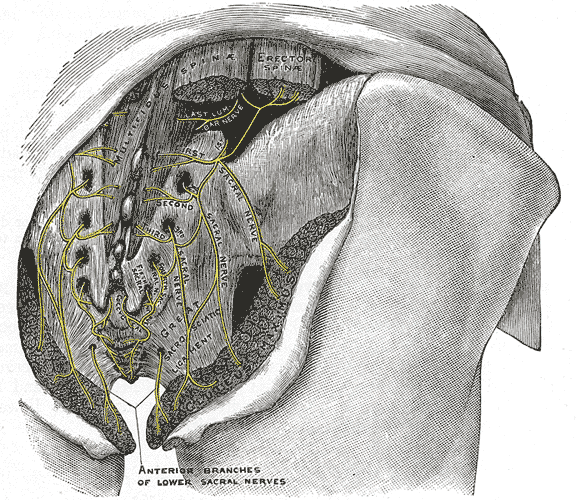
The posterior divisions of the sacral nerves.
