= Jen Selter =

American fitness model and Internet personality

- Born: Jennifer Selter; August 8, 1993 (age 33); Roslyn, New York, U.S.
- Occupation: Fitness model
- Website: jenselter.com

Jennifer Leigh "Jen" Selter (born August 9, 1993) is an American Internet celebrity and Fitness model. She attracted significant media attention for her debut at a young age, initially sharing photos of her Gym workouts on the photo-sharing app Instagram. She is widely credited with popularizing the term "Belfie", earning her the title of "Belfie Queen" across social media. As of June 2025, Jen Selter had 13.6 Million followers on Instagram. Selter grew up Jewish.

== See also ==
- Instagram model
