= Buttocks =

Anatomical feature on the posterior of some primates

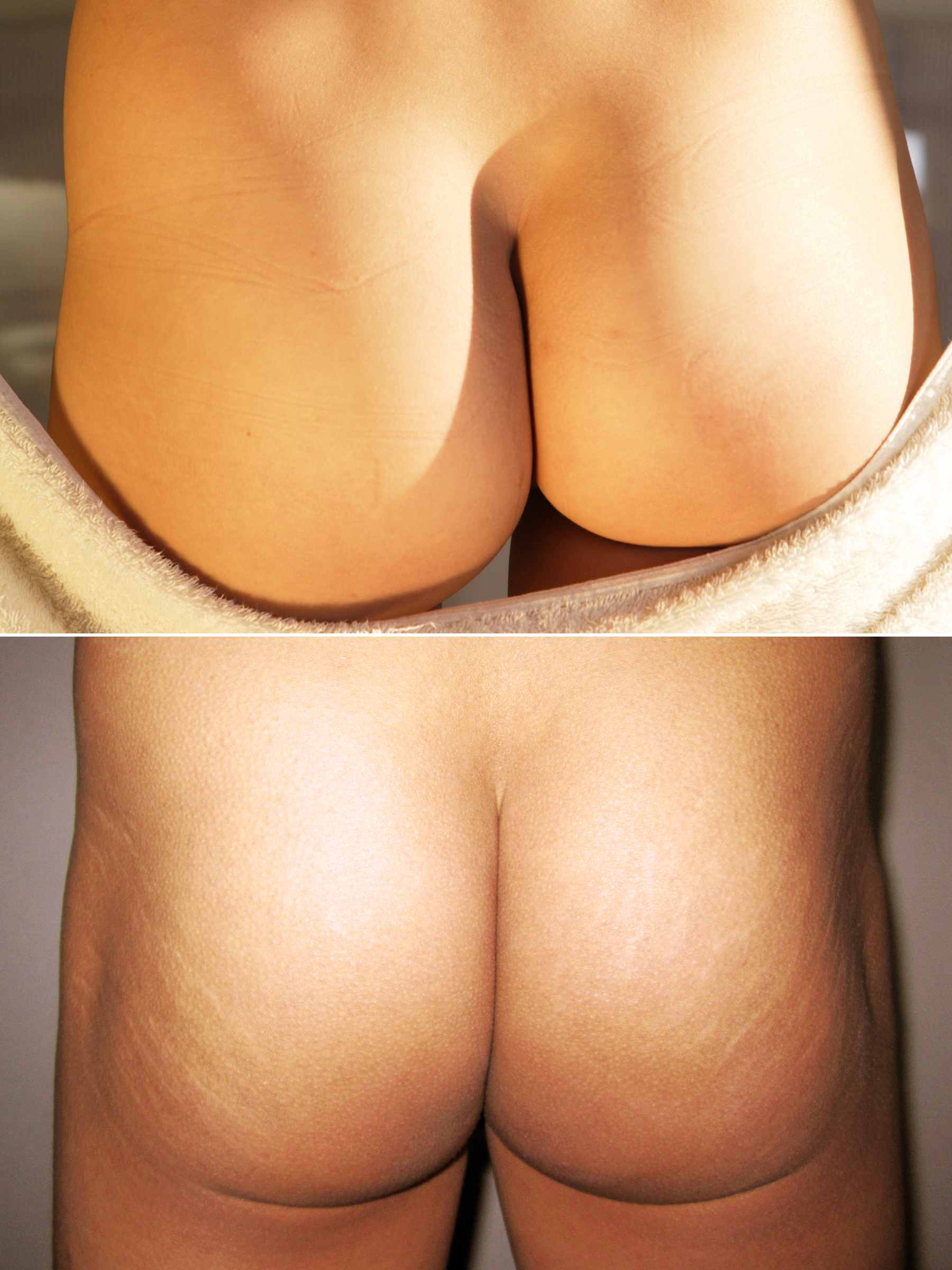
- Buttocks of a human female (upper) and a human male (lower)

Details
- Artery: Superior gluteal artery, inferior gluteal artery
- Nerve: Superior gluteal nerve, inferior gluteal nerve, superior cluneal nerves, medial cluneal nerves, inferior cluneal nerves

Identifiers
- Latin: clunis
- MeSH: D002081
- TA98: A01.1.00.033; A01.2.08.002
- TA2: 157
- FMA: 76446

The buttocks (sing.: buttock) are two rounded portions of the exterior anatomy of humans, located on the posterior of the pelvic region. The buttocks are located between the lower back and the perineum. They are composed of a layer of exterior skin and underlying subcutaneous fat superimposed on a left and right gluteus maximus and gluteus medius muscles. The two gluteus maximus muscles are the largest muscles in the human body. They are responsible for movements such as straightening the body into the upright (standing) posture when it is bent at the waist; maintaining the body in the upright posture by keeping the hip joints extended; and propelling the body forward via further leg (hip) extension when walking or running.

In many cultures, the buttocks play a role in sexual attraction. Many cultures have also used the buttocks as a primary target for corporal punishment, as the buttocks' layer of subcutaneous fat offers protection against injury while still allowing for the infliction of pain.

== Structure ==
The buttocks are formed by the masses of the gluteal muscles or "glutes" (the gluteus maximus muscle and the gluteus medius muscle) superimposed by a layer of fat. The superior aspect of the buttock ends at the iliac crest, and the lower aspect is outlined by the horizontal gluteal crease. The gluteus maximus has two insertion points: 1/3 superior portion of the linea aspera of the femur, and the superior portion of the iliotibial tractus. The masses of the gluteus maximus muscle are separated by an intermediate intergluteal cleft or "crack" in which the anus is situated.

The analogous anatomical structures known as ischial callosities allow primates to sit upright without resting their weight on their feet as four-legged animals do. The pads enable the primates to sleep sitting upright on thin branches, beyond reach of predators, without falling. Humans do not possess ischial callosities due to the gluteal muscles being large enough to provide the same cushioning. Females of certain species of baboon have red callosities that blush to attract males. In the case of humans, females tend to have proportionally wider and thicker buttocks due to higher subcutaneous fat and proportionally wider hips. In humans they also have a role in propelling the body in a forward motion and aiding bowel movement.

Some baboons and all gibbons, though otherwise fur-covered, have characteristic naked ischial callosities on their rears. While human children generally have smooth buttocks, mature males and females have varying degrees of hair growth, as on other parts of their body. Females may have hair growth in the gluteal cleft (including around the anus), sometimes extending laterally onto the lower aspect of the cheeks. Males may have hair growth over some or all of the buttocks.

== Names ==
The Latin name for the buttocks is nates (English pronunciation /ˈneɪtiːz/ NAY-teez, classical pronunciation nătes [ˈnateːs]) which is plural; the singular, natis (buttock), is rarely used. There are many colloquial terms for them.

== Gallery of art ==
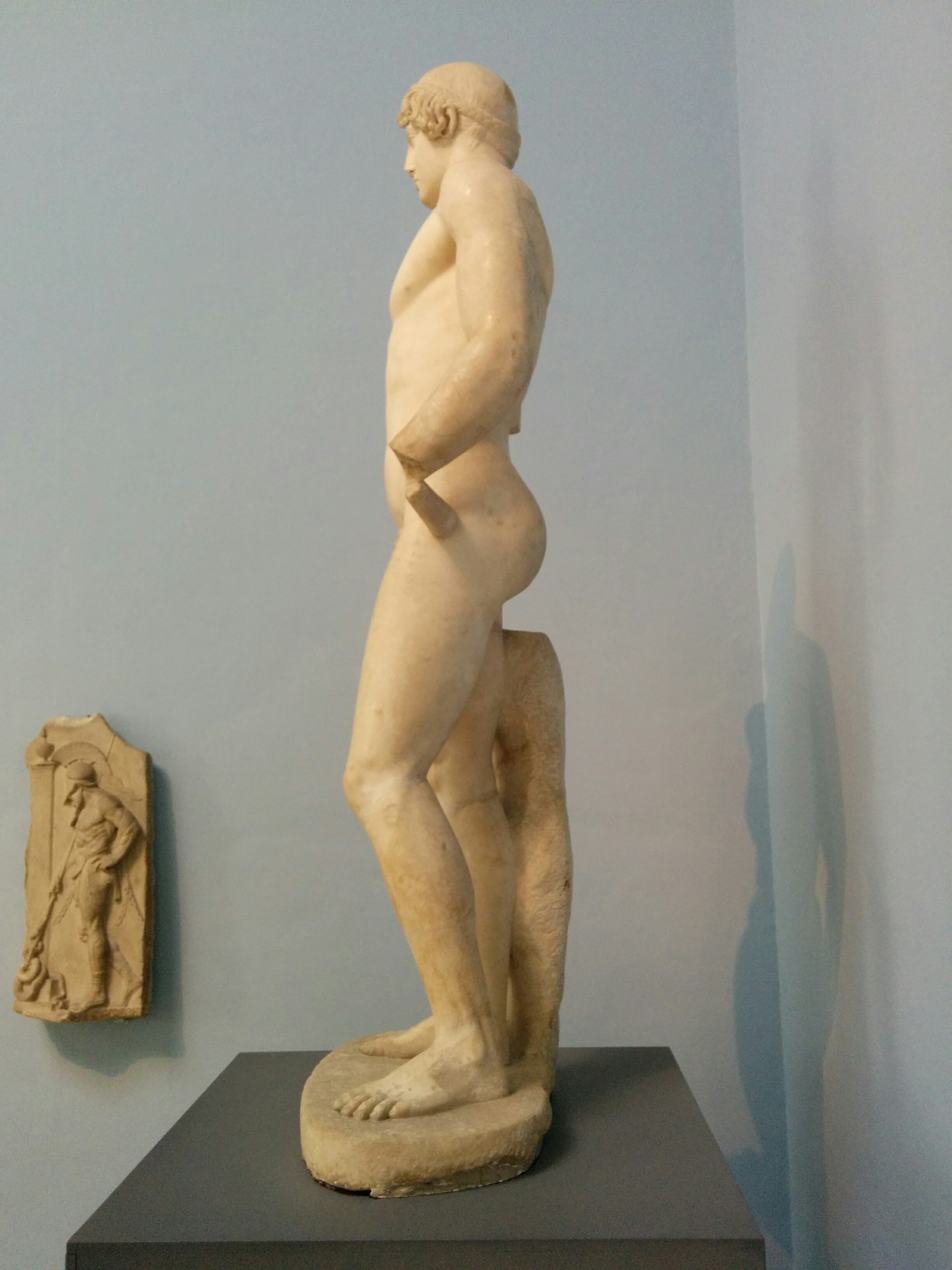
Prominent, muscular buttocks are a standard feature of athletic and military artwork from Ancient Greece, as demonstrated by this statue of a boxer. British Museum (c. 460 BC)

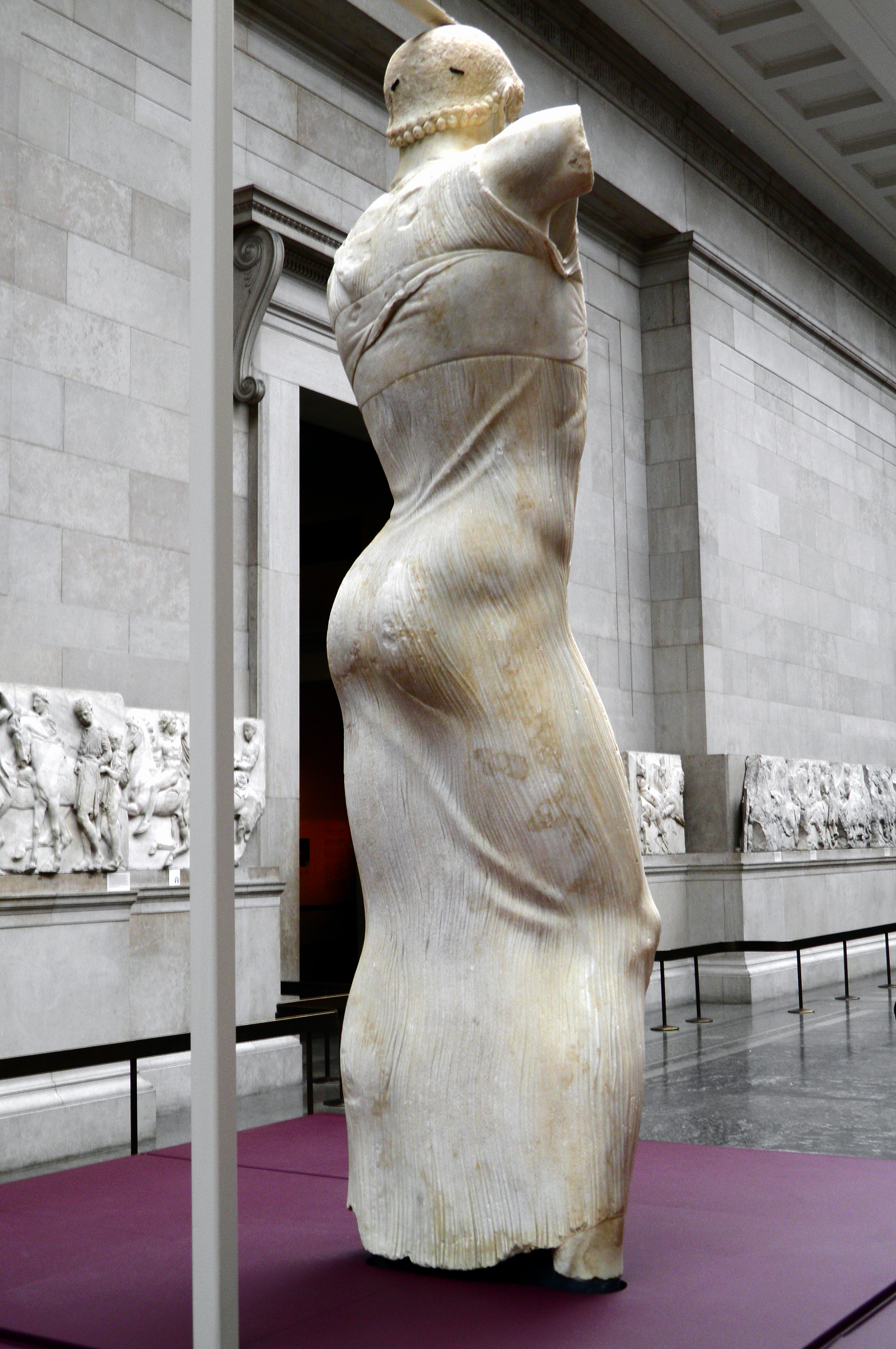
The Motya Charioteer, from Ancient Greece (c. 460–450 BC)

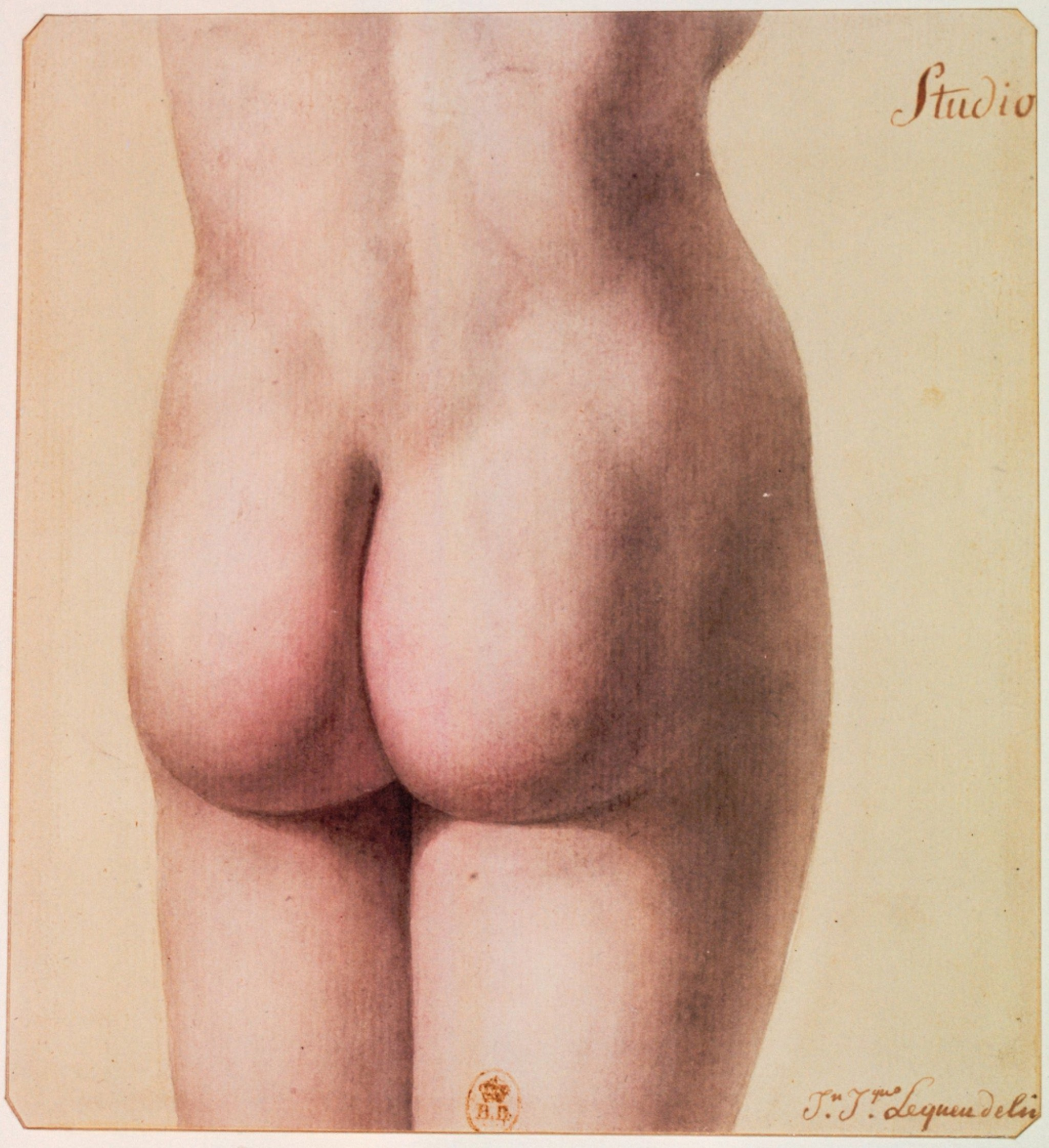
Jean-Jacques Lequeu (c. 1785)

Jules Lefebvre (c. 1874)

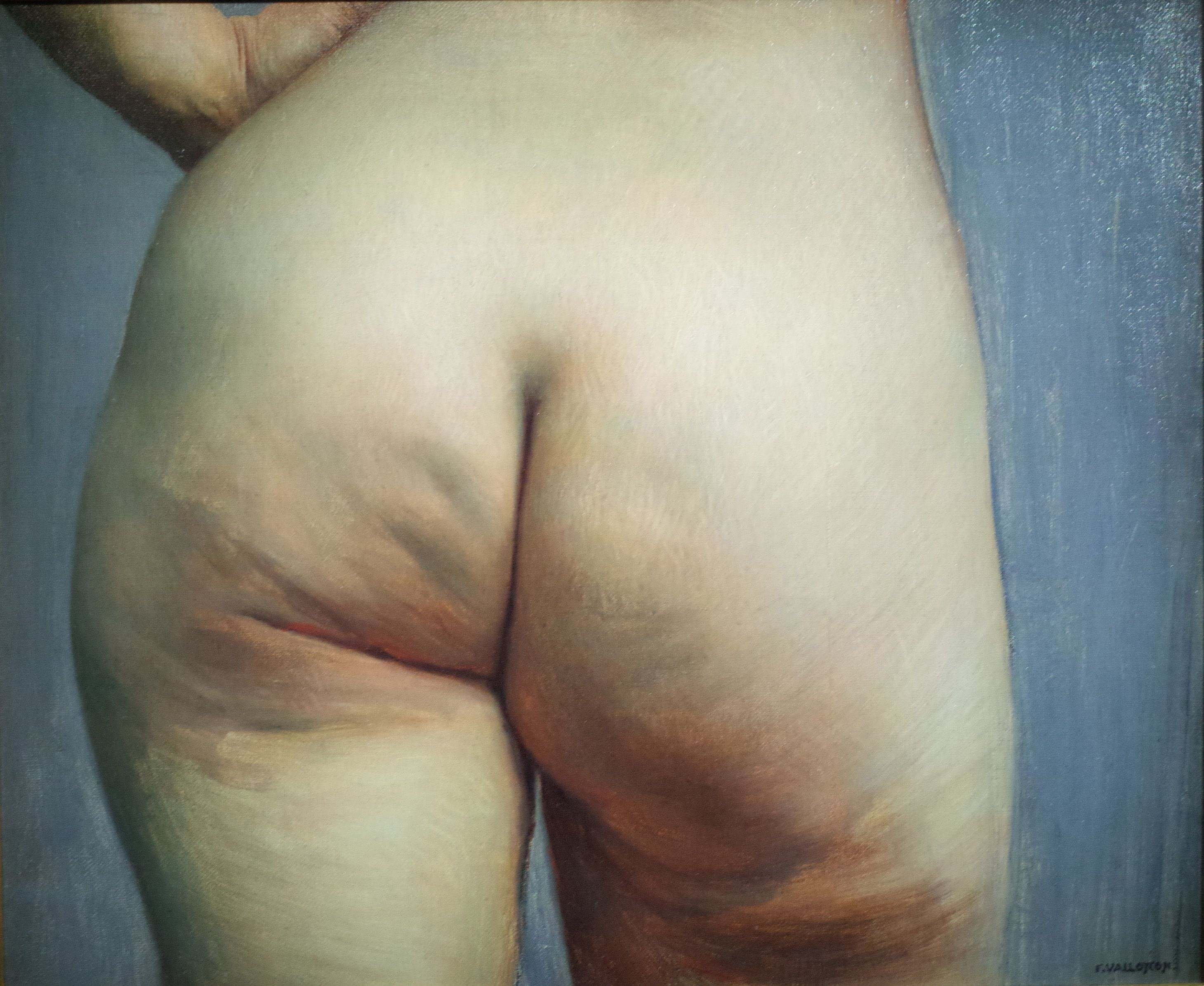
Félix Vallotton (c. 1884)

Georges Seurat's 1884 painting A Sunday Afternoon on the Island of La Grande Jatte depicts a woman on the right with a prominent bustle under her dress.

== Gallery ==
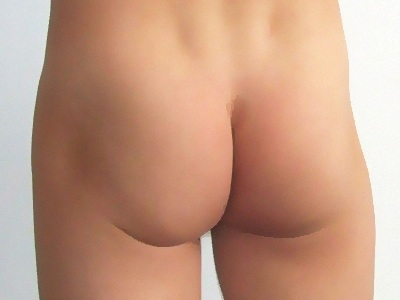
Buttocks of a male

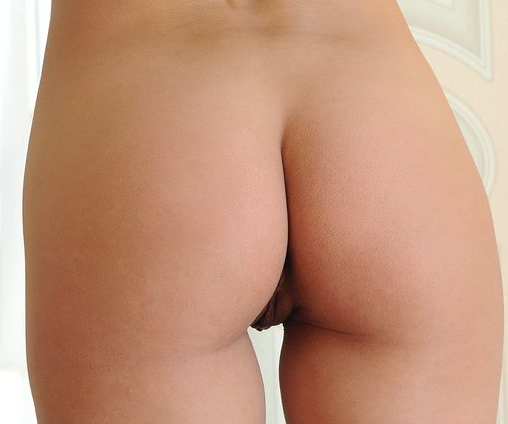
Buttocks of a female

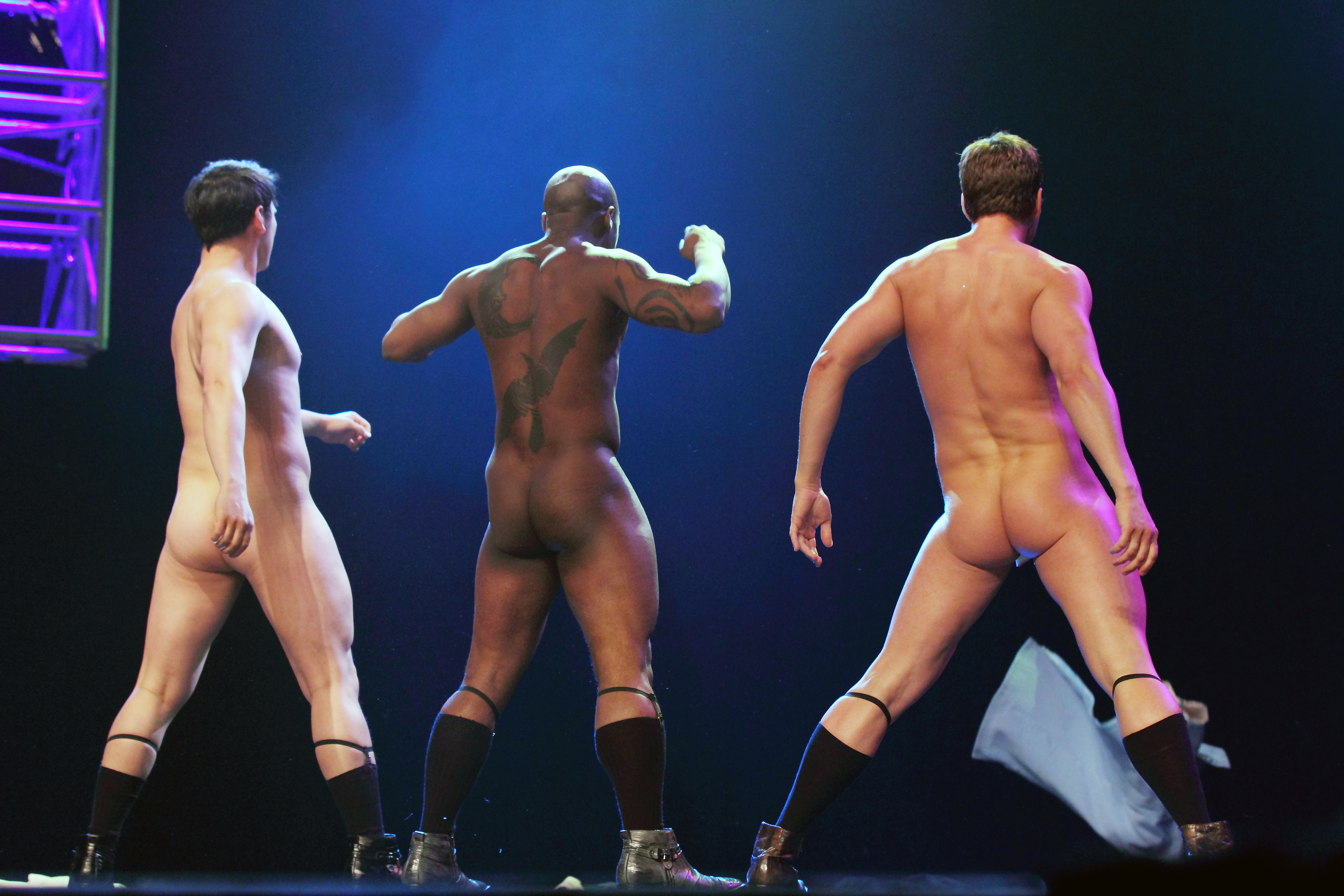
A burlesque stage show with three men in Las Vegas

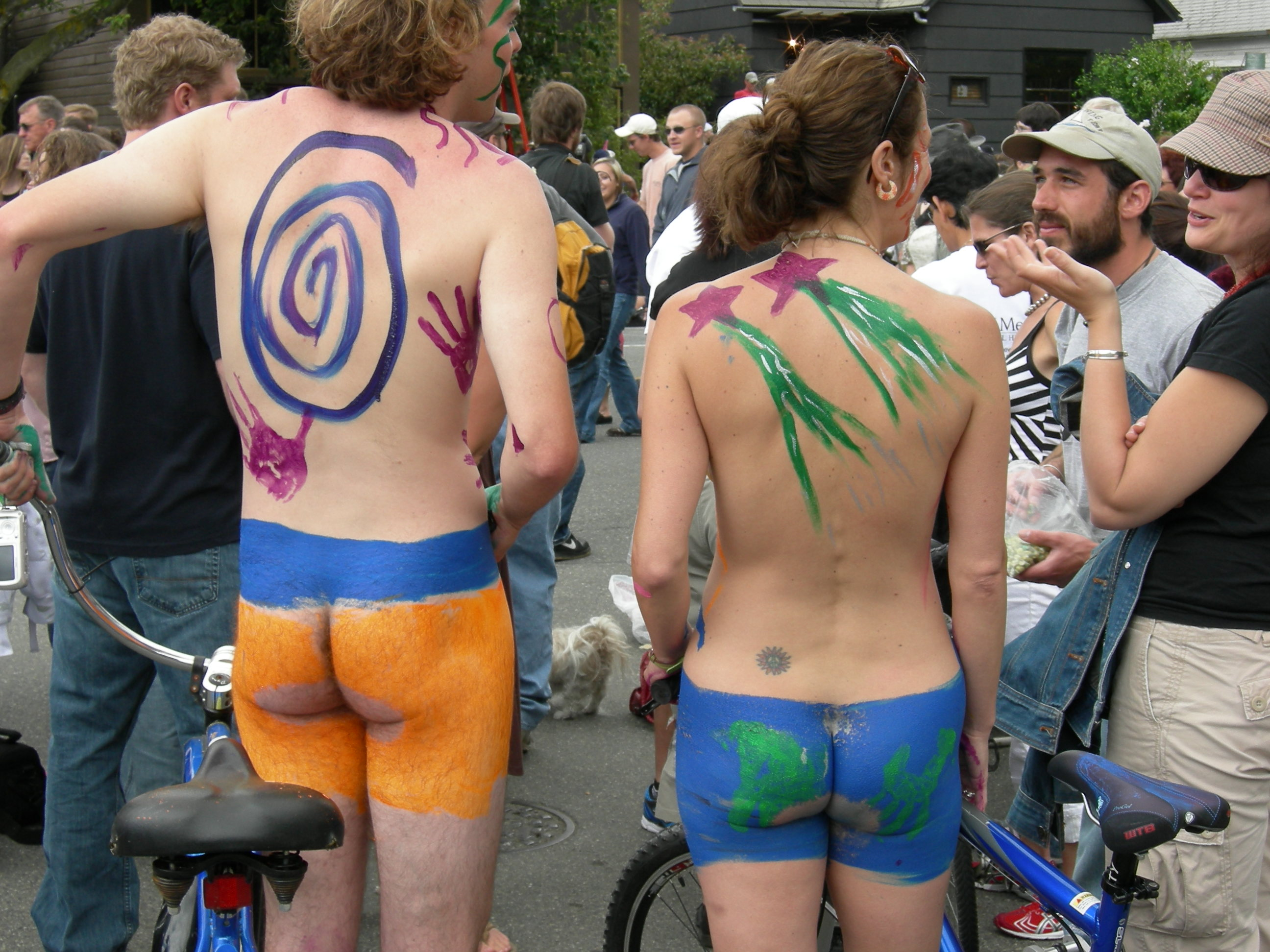
Seattle's nudist cyclists with painted buttocks

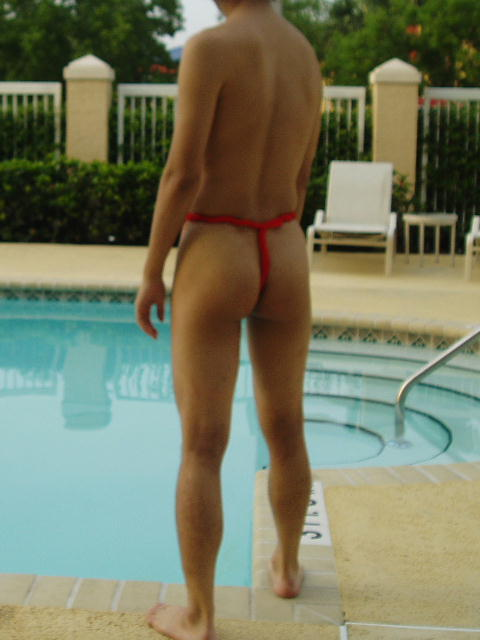
A Japanese man in traditional Fundoshi-rokushaku swimwear

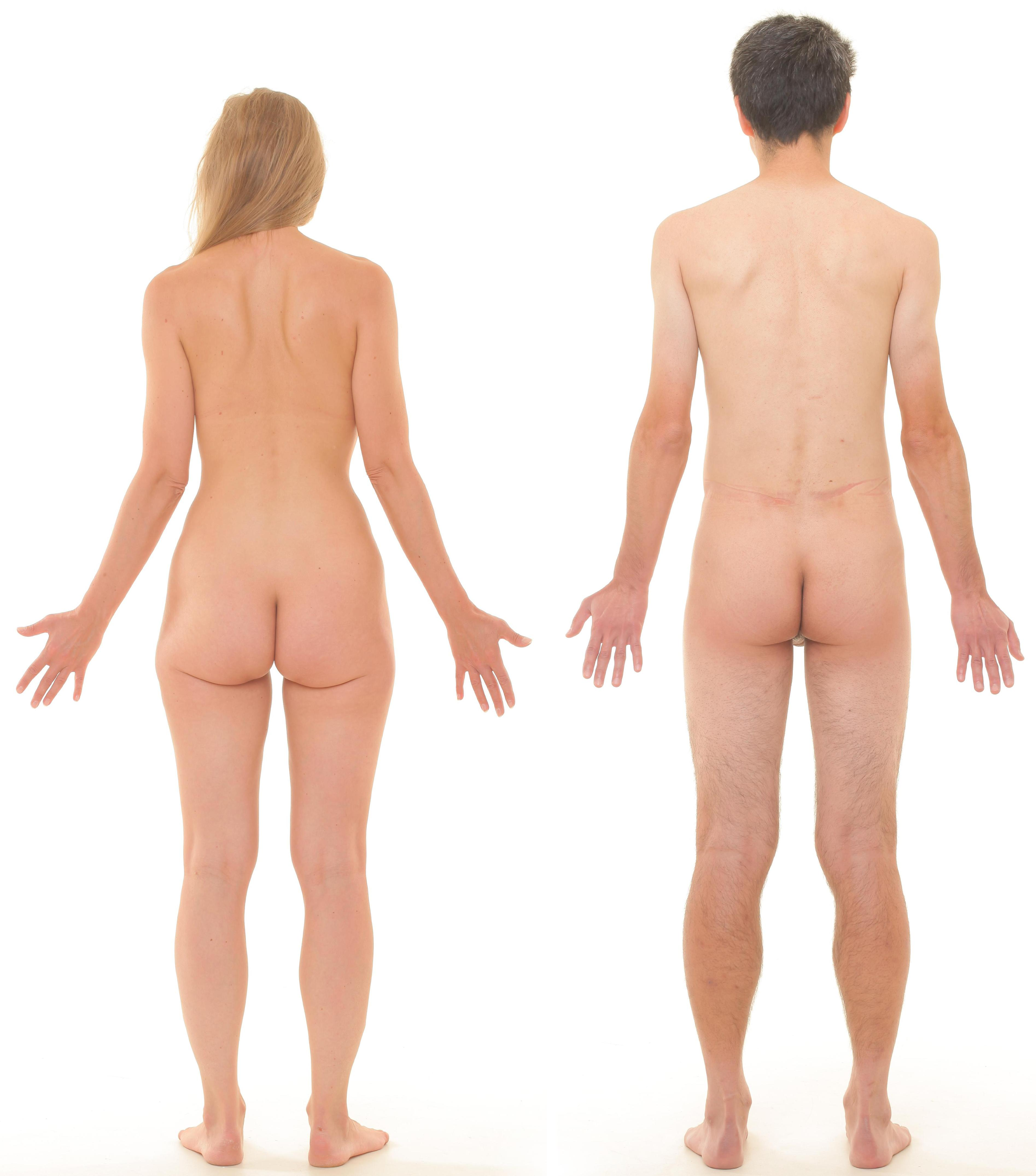
Posterior view of human female and male to show the comparison of their buttocks

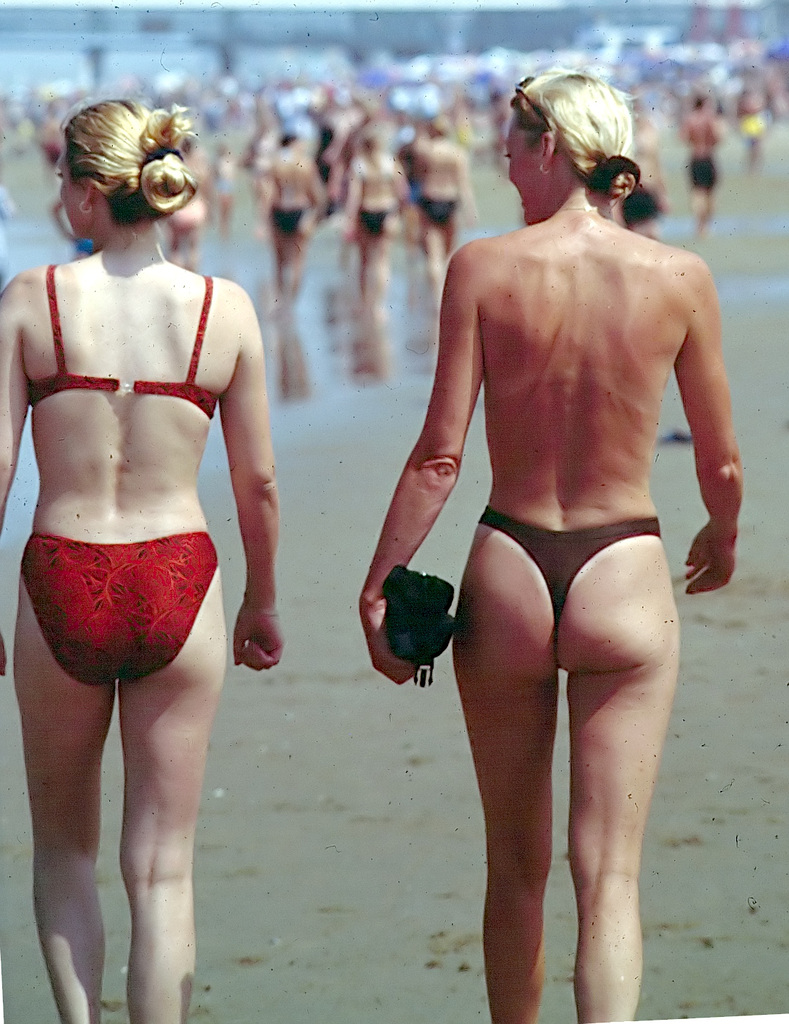
Some female clothing, such as the bikini or panties, show part of the female buttocks (woman on left). Thongs, in particular, leave almost all of the buttocks exposed (woman on right). Photo is of a beach in Holland, 1999.

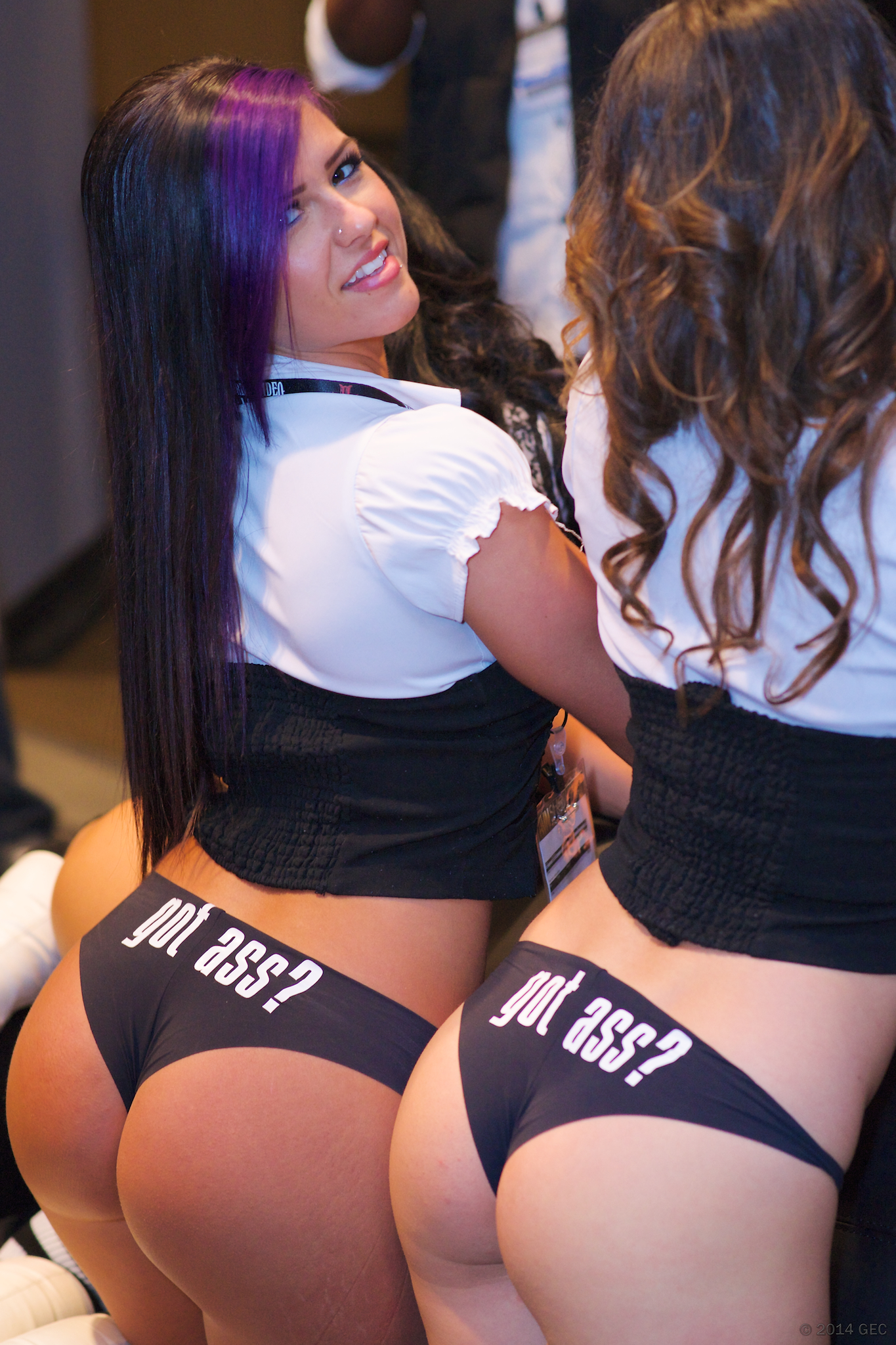
Models participate in "got ass?", a competition to judge the woman with best buttocks, at AVN Adult Entertainment Expo, Las Vegas, 2014.

== See also ==
- Belfie
- Bollocks
- Buttock augmentation
- Buttock cleavage
- Butts: A Backstory
- Cultural history of the buttocks
- Cellulite
- Coccyx
- Dimples of Venus
- Hip and buttock padding
- Intimate part
- Mooning
- Swabian salute
- Waist–hip ratio
