= Posterior branches of sacral nerves =

Neurological feature

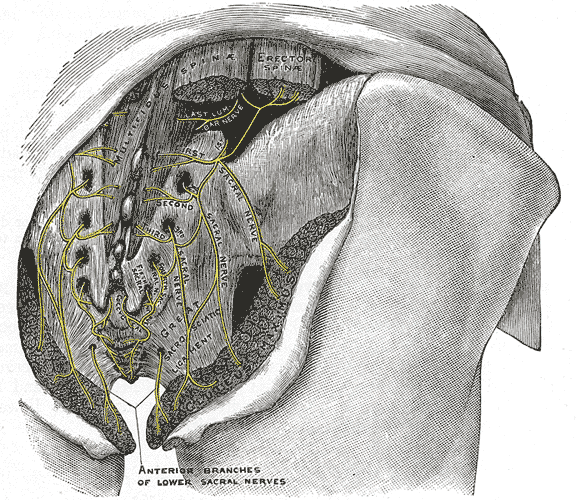
- The posterior divisions of the sacral nerves.

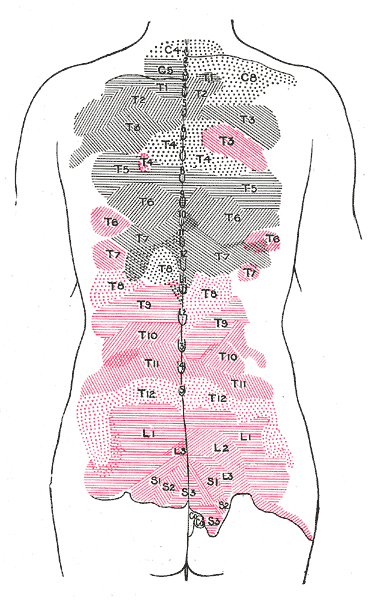
- Areas of distribution of the cutaneous branches of the posterior divisions of the spinal nerves. The areas of the medial branches are in black, those of the lateral in red.

Details
- From: sacral nerves
- To: medial cluneal nerves

Identifiers
- Latin: rami posteriores nervorum sacralium

The posterior divisions of the sacral nerves are small and diminish in size as they move downward; they emerge, except the last, through the posterior sacral foramina.

The upper three are covered at their points of exit by the multifidus and divide into medial and lateral branches.

== See also ==
- Spinal nerve
