= Selfie studio =

Type of photographic studio

Selfie studio is a new type of entertainment venue, which has become popular in recent years throughout the world, especially in Hong Kong. The selfie studios operate similarly as traditional photographic studios, with cameras, props and lighting. However, photos are not taken by skilled photographers but by the customers themselves. A Bluetooth remote control is used to take photos and thus, the whole process is self-controlled. Selfie studios provide customers with a private environment to express themselves at a comparatively low cost.

== History and development ==
The first selfie studio, TakaPhotoo, was set up in New York, United States, in June 2009.

In 2013, the studio started to operate under franchise and expanded to other countries, and it began to draw attention.

The selfie studios have been set up globally in places like Beijing, Shanghai, and Vancouver. The trend continues to spread to Europe. They started to appear in Hong Kong in late 2013.

== Features ==
A selfie studio usually consists of three to four rooms with different themes. Each room provides different backdrops, props and accessories for customers to choose from. A professional camera, two big screens for photo viewing and lighting are set up like traditional studios. Customers can enjoy the service by each paying a small fee with regard to the size of the group.

They then, can freely select the costumes they desire ranging from cartoon characters and animals, to wedding dresses and traditional garments. The customer base mainly consists of females, teenagers and families.

In order to enhance their competitiveness and add novelty value to existing customers, selfie studios regularly change the theme of their shooting rooms according to the customers’ preferences and tastes. New props and backdrops will be provided. Festivals and foreign countries’ sceneries are some common themes. Some studios even try to improve their business by the provision of new services, for instance, renting out the studio for parties, offering discounts and holding selfie competitions.

== Impact ==
Customers can dress in whatever ways they like and take as many photos until they are satisfied. Therefore, posting those photos on social networking platforms like Facebook and Instagram has become a prevalent phenomenon. This behaviour, as much as we can observe, is exceptionally common in Hong Kong. The selfie studio allows customers to take group selfies with 2-10 people. It turns the solo activity into an opportunity for people to gather with their friends. The quality of the selfie shoots in studios with lighting and professional cameras are better than those taken with mobile phones.

Customers can create different images of themselves with the use of props and costumes. This does not only allow the customers to bring their creativeness into full play, but also allows them to express their ideal selves through the selfies.

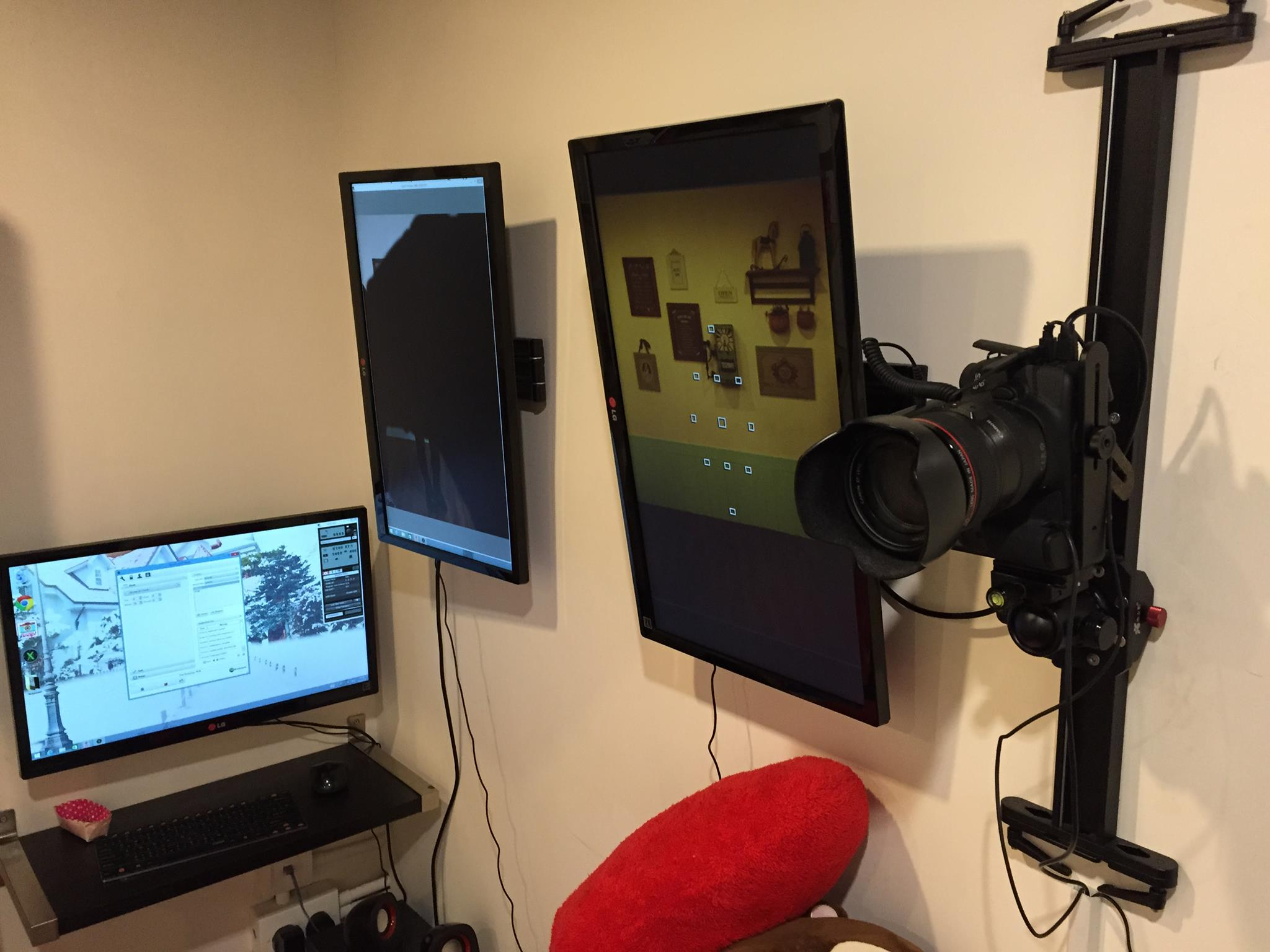
Professional tools are set up

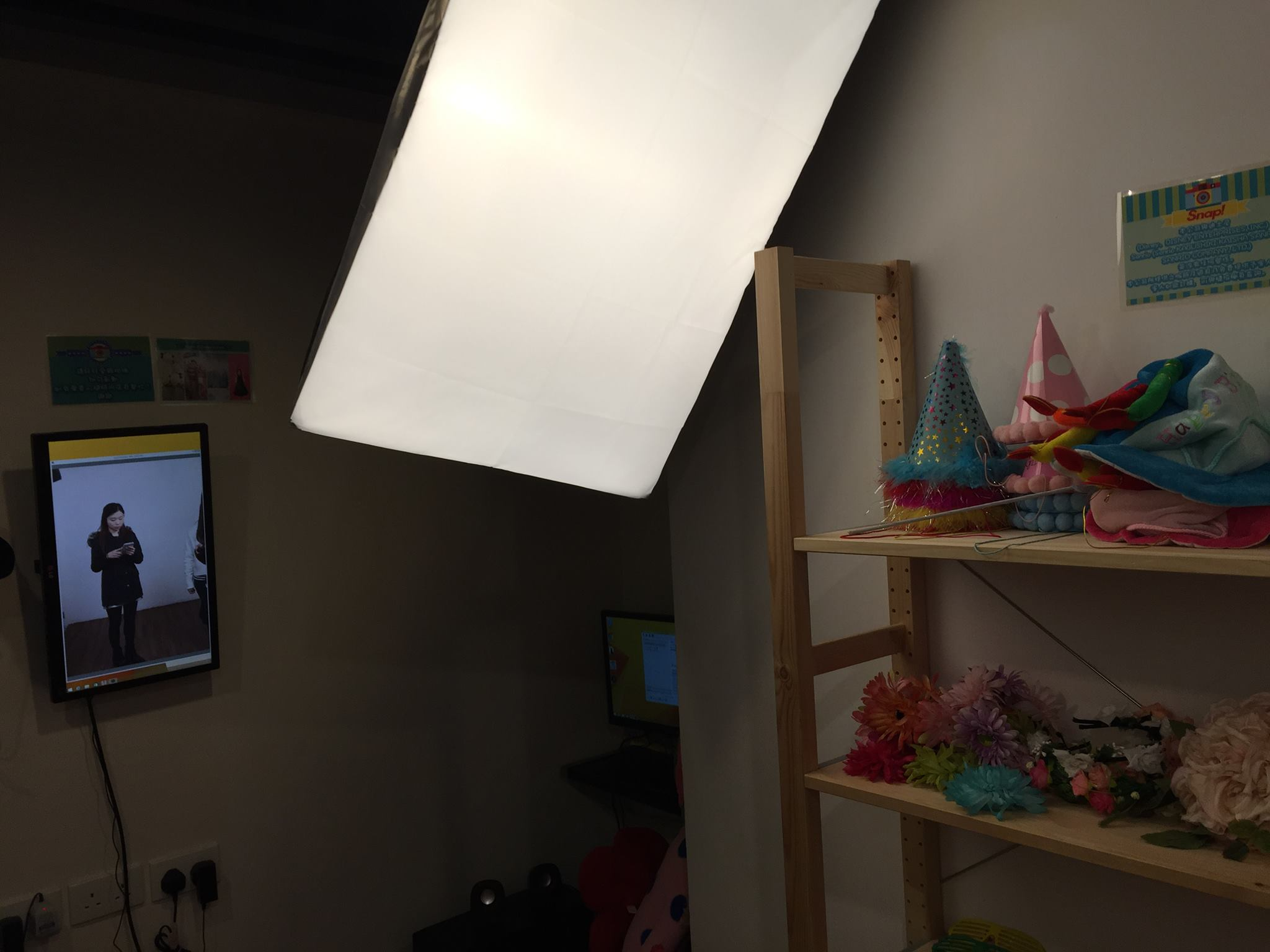
Lightings are arranged in the studio

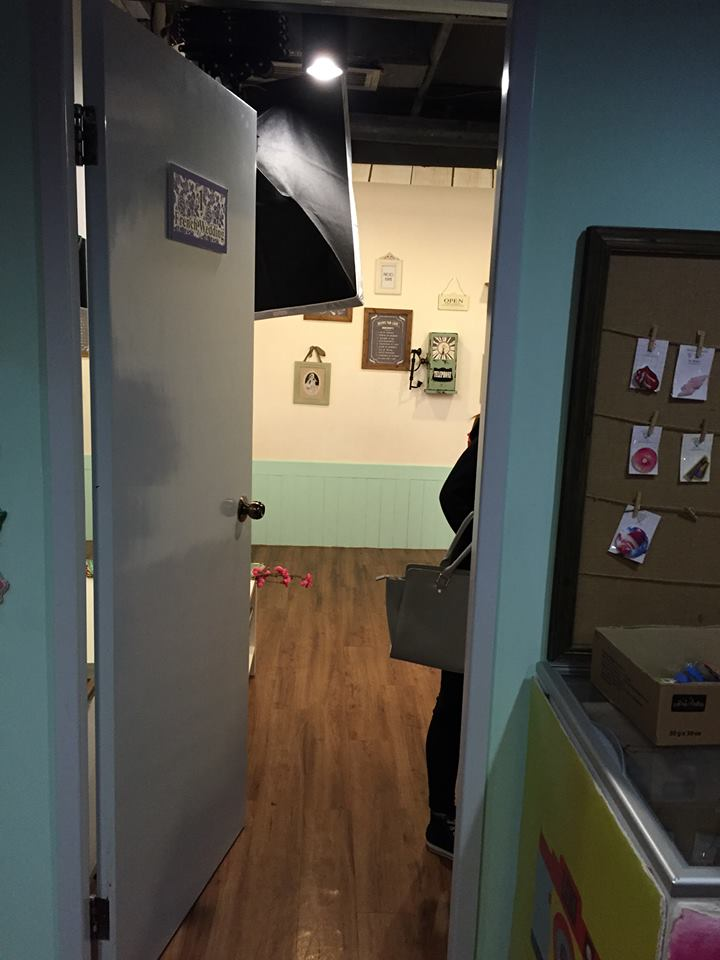
A selfie studio is divided into rooms for taking selfies

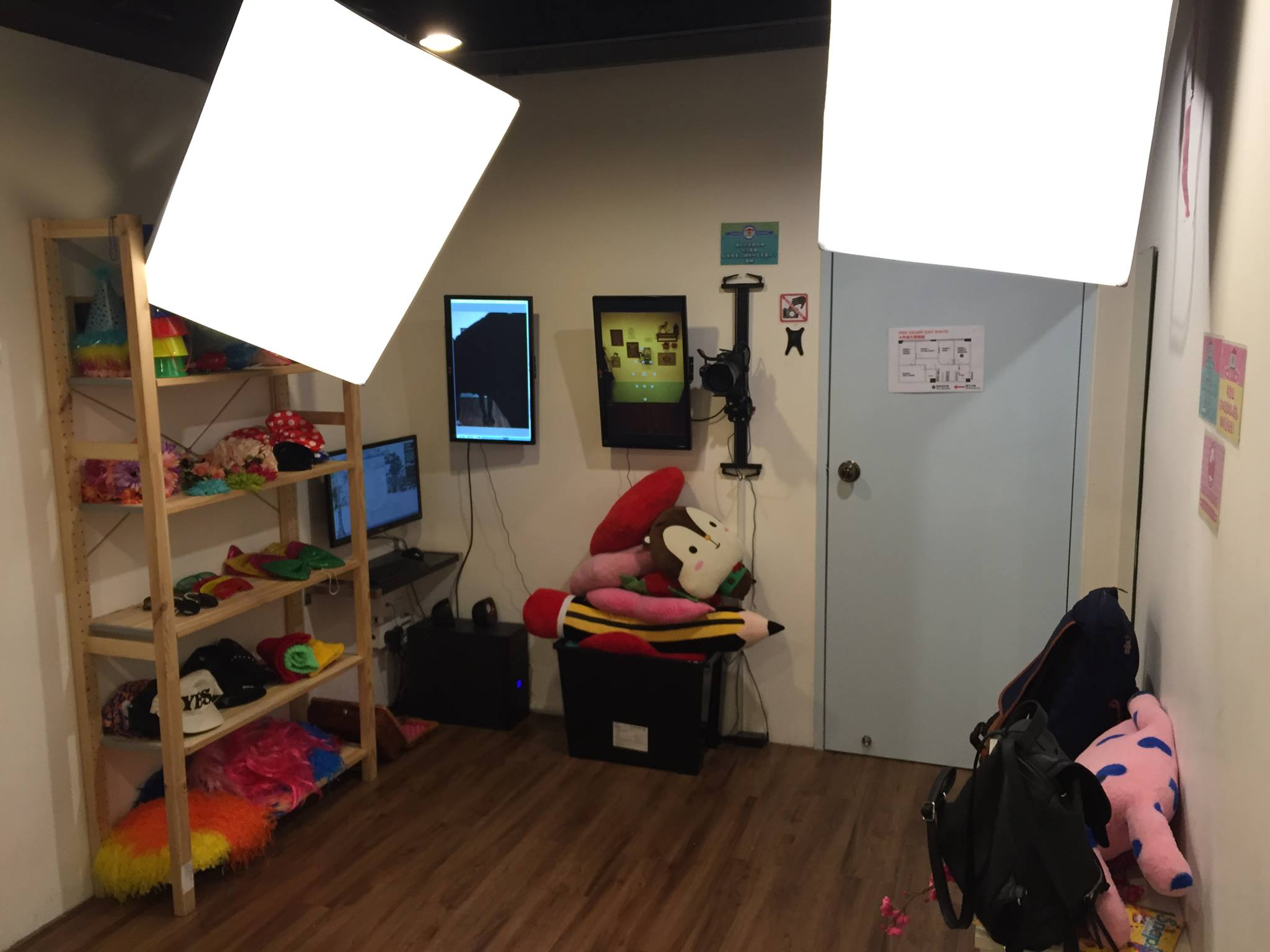
The setting of the room of taking selfies

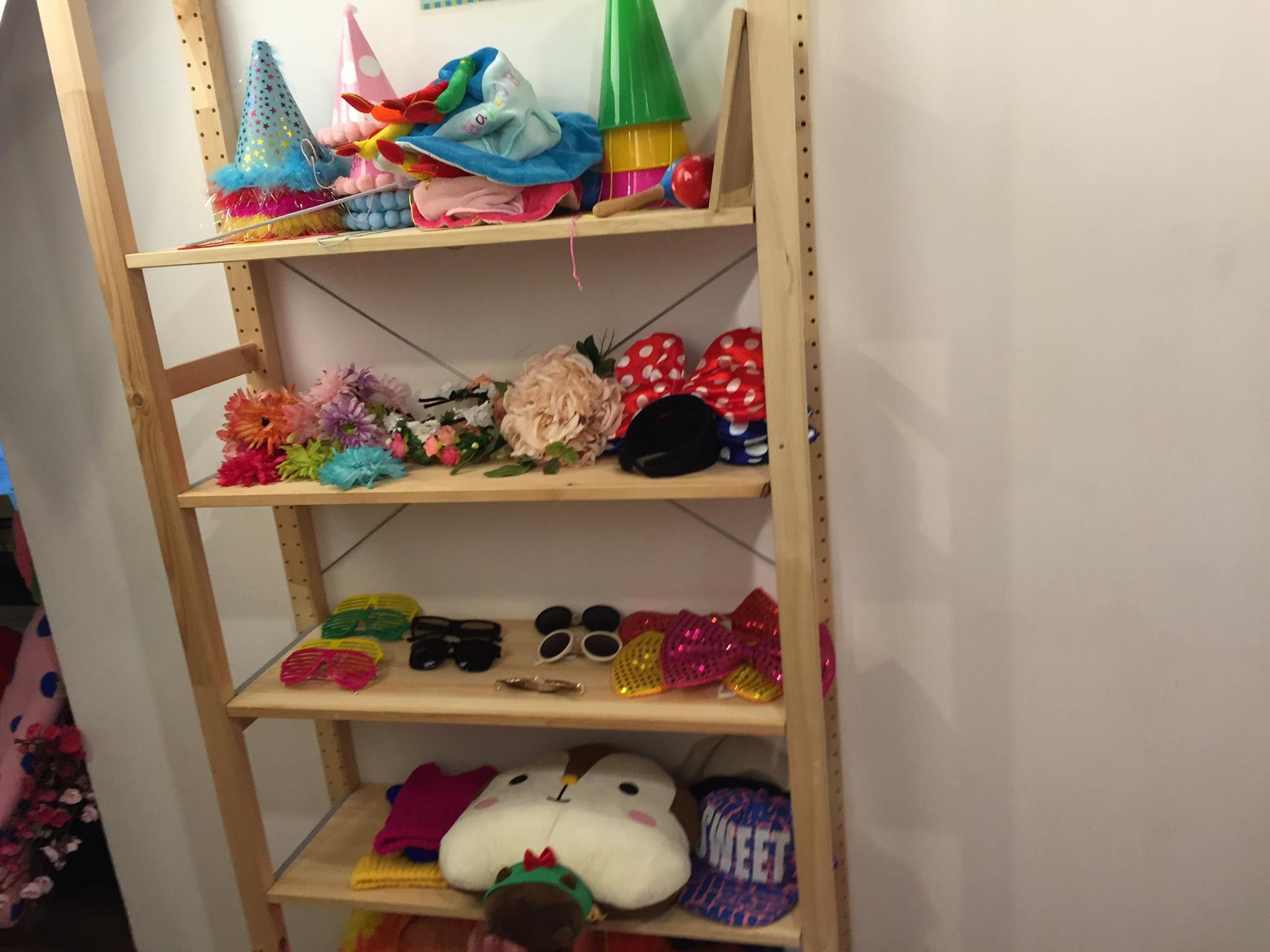
Various props are prepared in studio

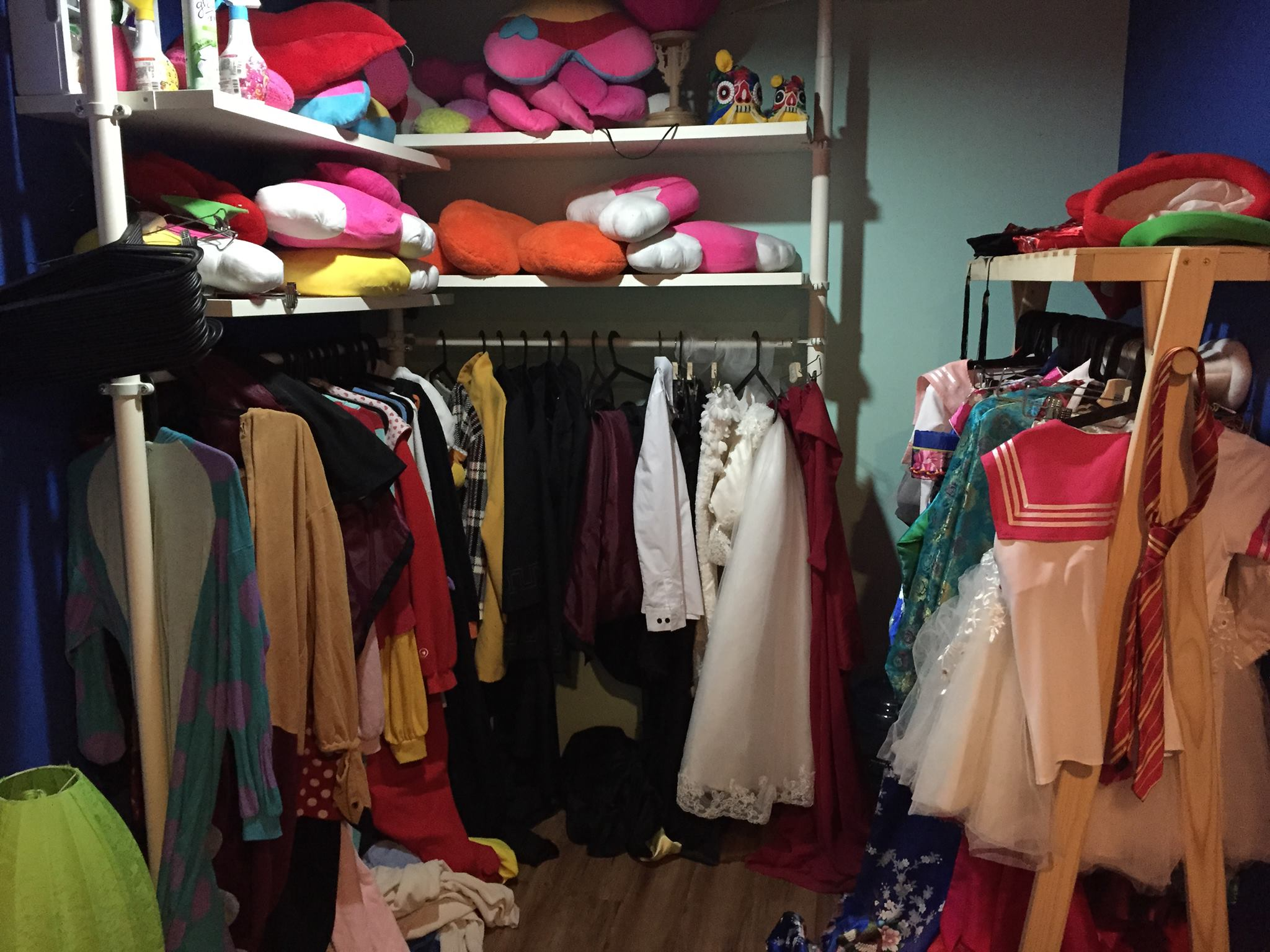
Costumes for customers to wear and take selfies
