= Fitness model (person) =

Model focusing on displaying an athletic physique

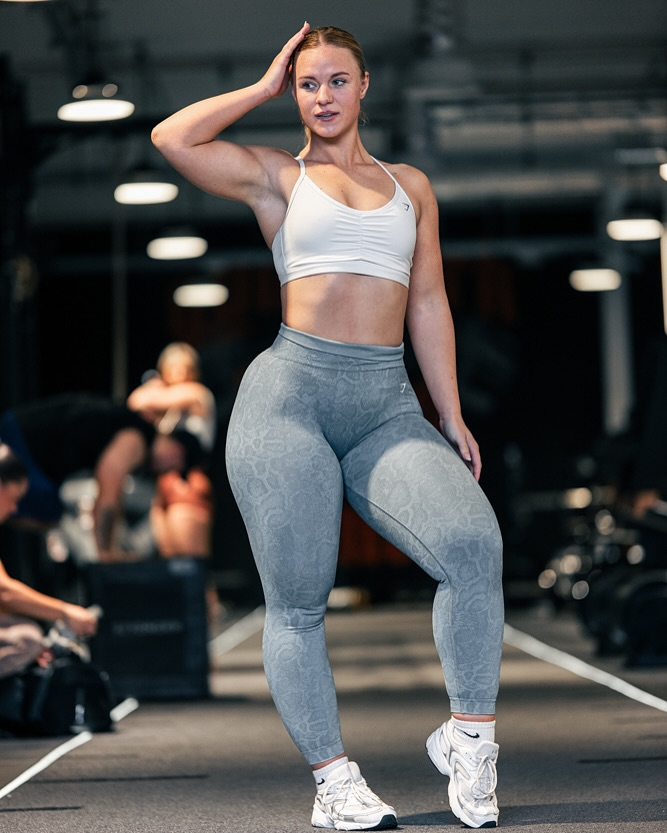
A fitness model in 2023

A fitness model is a person who models to promote fitness-related products, services, or lifestyles, emphasizing a healthy, toned, and athletic physique.

Fitness models are typically featured in media such as magazines, advertisements, television, and social media platforms, showcasing athletic apparel, fitness equipment, supplements, or health-focused campaigns. Unlike fashion models, fitness models prioritize muscle definition and physical fitness over conventional aesthetic standards, often embodying strength and wellness. Many fitness models are also athletes, personal trainers, or competitors in fitness and figure competitions, and their work may involve demonstrating physical activities during photo shoots or promotional events. The role has grown significantly with the rise of the global fitness industry and social media, where fitness models influence audiences through workout routines, nutrition advice, and motivational content.

== History ==
The concept of fitness modeling emerged alongside the physical culture movement in the late 19th and early 20th centuries, when individuals like Bernarr Macfadden promoted health and exercise through publications and public demonstrations. Macfadden, often called the "father of physical culture," founded Physical Culture magazine in 1899, which popularized the idealized athletic body and set the stage for fitness-related media.

In the mid-20th century, the fitness industry expanded with the establishment of gyms and health clubs, notably through pioneers like Vic Tanny and Jack LaLanne. LaLanne, a highly influential figure, opened one of the first fitness centers in the 1930s and later used television to promote exercise, effectively becoming an early fitness model by demonstrating workouts and healthy living to a broad audience. The 1980s marked a significant turning point with the rise of home workout videos, led by figures like Jane Fonda, whose aerobics tapes popularized fitness modeling for a mainstream audience. These videos featured physically fit individuals demonstrating exercises, blending athleticism with media presence.

The advent of fitness and figure competitions in the 1980s, such as the Fitness Olympia and Fitness America, further defined the role of fitness models. These competitions, which emphasized muscle definition and presentation over the extreme muscularity of bodybuilding, created a platform for athletes to gain visibility and transition into modeling roles for fitness brands. The rise of social media in the 2000s transformed fitness modeling, enabling individuals to build personal brands on platforms like Instagram, YouTube, and TikTok. Today, fitness models play a key role in advertising and inspiring fitness culture, often collaborating with brands, publishing workout plans, or competing professionally while maintaining a strong online presence. Fitness models like Jen Selter have covered in entertainment websites in the 2020s.

A 2018 BBC Radio 5 Live report by model Jacqui Ryland noted that, the rise of fitness and bodybuilding competitions led some female fitness models to use performance-enhancing drugs, such as steroids and growth hormones, to achieve the highly defined physiques demanded in categories like "bikini body" and "body fitness."

== Characteristics ==
Unlike traditional models, whose work is often tied to specific body measurements, fitness models are characterized by a trained, defined musculature. The focus is less on an extremely slim appearance and more on body definition, low body fat percentage, and overall presence. Male fitness models typically display a pronounced six-pack and muscular arms, while female models showcase defined abdominal, leg, and gluteal muscles. In contrast to bodybuilding, which aims for maximum muscle mass, fitness modeling focuses on an aesthetically defined physique with emphasized but not exaggerated musculature. They are also typically required to remain in physical shape year-round, with a camera-ready body viewed as essential to their work. Fitness models achieve year around body, with visible muscle definition, which is considered important for looking photographic by hydration management and cardiovascular training as part of general fitness routines aimed at achieving a lean muscular appearance.

== Culture ==
Fitness modeling has significantly shaped contemporary fitness culture, promoting ideals of health, strength, and aesthetic appeal. The visibility of fitness models in gyms, media, and online platforms has fostered a culture that celebrates physical fitness and body confidence. In fitness settings, such as gyms and studios, the presence of fitness models—often showcasing toned physiques in form-fitting athletic wear—has influenced societal perceptions of beauty and athleticism. This visibility has contributed to a broader acceptance of athletic wear as both functional and fashionable, particularly among women, who often use stylish leggings and crop tops to express confidence and personal style.

The culture surrounding fitness modeling also reflects complex social dynamics. In gym environments, the emphasis on physical appearance can draw attention to fitness models’ bodies, with some individuals noting the aesthetic appeal of form-fitting clothing. This attention has sparked discussions about body positivity, empowerment, and the objectification of fitness professionals, particularly women. Fitness models, through their public personas, often promote self-confidence and empowerment, encouraging individuals to embrace their bodies while pursuing fitness goals. Social media platforms have amplified this cultural impact, allowing fitness models to share workout routines, fashion choices, and motivational messages, fostering communities centered on health and wellness.

Fitness modeling has influenced gym culture by highlighting the visibility of fitness professionals and their athletic wear in workout environments. Fitness models, often seen in form-fitting clothing, draw attention to their physiques, sparking discussions about social interactions and gym etiquette. TikTok influencer Southern Gym Bunny has stated that respectful glances from others in the gym are "welcome", viewing them as acknowledgment of her fitness efforts and choice of "tiny outfits" that showcase her physique. Conversely, Canadian fitness model Makayla Anisa confronted a man staring at her during a workout, describing the experience as uncomfortable and advocating for respect in shared gym spaces.

== Economy ==
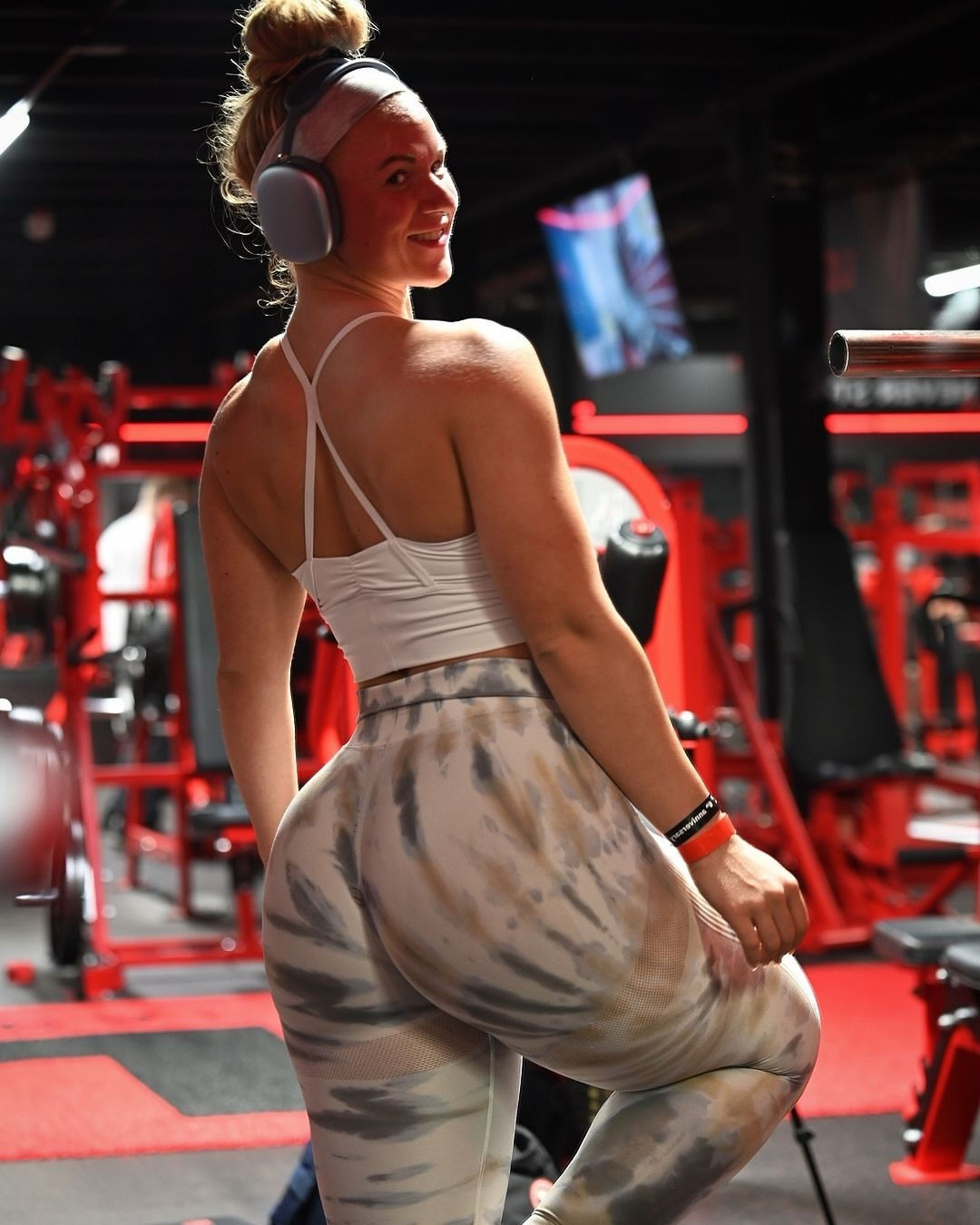
A fitness model wearing gym leggings and tops in 2023

The fitness modeling industry is a significant segment of the global fitness market. Fitness models contribute to this economy by endorsing products such as athletic apparel, supplements, and gym equipment. A key driver of economic growth has been the popularity of women's athletic wear, particularly form-fitting leggings, crop tops, and sports bras, which combine functionality with aesthetic appeal. Brands like Lululemon, Nike, and Gymshark have capitalized on the trend of women wearing stylish, form-fitting clothing in gyms and on social media, generating significant revenue. These garments, often modeled by fitness influencers, are marketed for their comfort, flexibility, and ability to enhance confidence, appealing to consumers who value both performance and style.

Social media has further transformed the economic landscape for fitness models, particularly women, who leverage platforms like Instagram and TikTok to build large followings and monetize their influence. Popular fitness models may earn substantial income through sponsored posts, brand partnerships, and affiliate marketing, often promoting athletic wear and fitness products. This digital economy has enabled fitness models to become entrepreneurs, launching their own apparel lines, workout programs, or online coaching services, further contributing to the industry's economic impact.

== Clothing and equipment ==
Fitness models rely on specialized clothing and equipment to perform their roles effectively, both in professional shoots and fitness environments. Athletic wear, including leggings, sports bras, crop tops, and compression gear, is designed to provide comfort, flexibility, and durability during physical activity. For women, form-fitting leggings and tops have become iconic in fitness modeling, offering practical benefits such as moisture-wicking fabrics, stretchability, and support for high-intensity workouts. These garments also enhance visual appeal, accentuating muscle definition and physique, which is essential for modeling fitness products and inspiring audiences.

The popularity of stylish, form-fitting athletic wear, particularly women's leggings and crop tops, has grown due to their versatility and aesthetic appeal. These garments are designed to flatter the body while providing functionality, boosting wearers’ confidence during workouts and public appearances. Brands market these items as empowering tools for self-expression, enabling women to showcase their strength and style in gyms, studios, and social media. Beyond clothing, fitness models often use equipment like resistance bands, dumbbells, and yoga mats, which are frequently featured in their promotional content to demonstrate exercises and endorse products.

On July 12, 2025, Adidas also listed designer leggings and tops in the "Gym & Workout Clothes" section of its website.

== See also ==
- Health club
- Fitness culture
