= Imago camera =

Imago Camera
Overview
- Type: Large format

Lens
- Lens: Imago Optical System

Focusing
- Focus: Fixed focus

General
- Dimensions: 685×390×355 cm (270×154×140 in) (W * H×D)

Imago (stylised as IMAGO) is an analog, walk-in, large format photo camera. It creates life-size self-portraits of people on 62 × 200 cm photographic paper via direct exposure. Since a negative is not created, every image is unique and cannot be reprinted. The images are colloquially referred to as "Imago-grams." The only existing camera was built in the 1970s by German physicist Werner Kraus and artist Erhard Hößle. It is based on an optical system invented by Kraus for scientific purposes.

The camera was in museum storage from 1976 to 2006, when it was rediscovered and rebuilt by the inventor's daughter, artist Susanna Kraus.

== History ==
In 1970, physicist Werner Kraus was commissioned to photographically document the Daimler-Benz Wankel engine’s combustion cycle. For this purpose, he invented a photo-optical system which captured images on a 1:1 scale. Later, based on the same system, Kraus, together with the artist and sculptor Erhard Hößle, built the Imago Camera. The camera and its photographs were exhibited in Munich during the Fluxus-movement. It operated for several years, but was archived in 1978 due to cessation of production of the photographic paper, which was essential for its operation. It was later stored in the archive of the Pinakothek der Moderne museum in Munich.

== Restoration ==
In 2005, photographs taken by the camera were rediscovered by Kraus' daughter, Susanna Kraus, which renewed her interest in Imago, and prompted her to restore it. During the following year, Susanna Kraus searched for a manufacturer who would produce the necessary photographic paper. When she convinced Ilford Switzerland in 2006 to develop and start the production of the direct positive paper, the curator of the New Collection of the Pinakothek der Moderne museum Florian Hufnagl agreed to release the camera from the archive and return it to the inventor's daughter. At the end of 2006, the first exhibition of the photos made with the restored Imago Camera was held in Vienna. After several years of travelling and exhibitions, in 2011, the camera inhabited a new photo studio started by Susanna Kraus in the Aufbau Haus on Moritzplatz, Berlin Kreuzberg. It has been operating at this location since.

== Characteristics ==
Imago is a large format camera measuring 6.85 × 3.9 × 3.55 meters. It is designed to capture life-size analog images of subjects inside it. The camera is equipped with an optical system, specifically constructed for it, with an extremely high focal length allowing pictures to be taken on a 1:1 scale, without warping. The camera features a special internal setting of six strobe lights providing a high intensity light necessary for production of the large direct exposure images on paper, which is considerably less photosensitive than film. The Camera produces 62 × 200 cm sized black and white prints on Imago and Harman Direct Positive Paper. Inside the camera, one can see a true-sided reflection of oneself in a special mirror, serving as a viewfinder. The picture is taken by the subject releasing a trigger.

== Imago photographic paper ==
Imago Camera uses silver gelatin direct positive photographic paper developed in cooperation with Ilford Switzerland and HARMAN Technology specially for Imago. It is made for direct exposure and reacts as soon as an image is exposed onto it. The exposed paper is developed in a conventional black and white process taking ten minutes, after which the print is ready. The resulting images are characterized by high contrast and display a wide range of tones.

== Further developments ==
In 2014 the Imago technology was redeveloped and wrapped in a new design shell. Built by Jakob Kraus, the new aluminum camera was called the Imago Photour and was designed to be mobile. Transported in a 40-foot container, it can be reassembled at a new location within two days. The new camera's first destinations were Rotterdam and Shanghai, where the first Imago Photour exhibitions were held in 2014 to 2015.

== Notable people who have made self-portraits with Imago ==
Nick Cave, Robert Wilson, Eva Mattes, Jonathan Meese, Anton Corbijn, Mike Leigh, François Ozon, Barbara Sukowa, Ernst Fuchs, Donata and Wim Wenders, Tim Raue, Angela Winkler, Maria Schrader, F. C. Gundlach.

== Exhibitions ==
- 2006 European Month of Photography in Vienna. First exposition of Imago after 30 years named “Vienna’s analysts in the black box”.
- 2007 User - Century of the consumer, ZKM in Karlsruhe (2007) Director - Peter Weibel.
- 2011 The Punks of Kreuzberg, European Month of Photography Berlin, Imago Gallery Moritzplatz, Berlin, Germany.
- 2013 Imagographie, opening of the temporary art gallery "Schaustelle", Pinakothek der Moderne, Munich, Germany.
- 2014 Imago-Nation, Imago Gallery Moritzplatz, Berlin, Germany (guest exhibition Annegret Kohlmayer).
- 2014 Faces of Rotterdam, DE Rotterdam, world premiere of Imago Photour Camera, the Netherlands.
- 2015 German Premiereof Imago Photour Camera, Gallery Weekend, 10th Anniversary of Spinnerei Galerien Leipzig, Germany.
- 2015/2016 Blackout, exhibition tour in collaboration with Memorieslab Ltd, Shanghai, China.
- 2016 Touched – Craftsmanship in Contemporary Photography. Group exhibition curated by Anton Corbijn, Unseen Photo Festival, Amsterdam, the Netherlands.
- 2016 Self Portraits of the 1970s, European Month of Photography Berlin, Imago Gallery Moritzplatz, Berlin, Germany.
- 2017 Rendezvous Berlin, solo exhibition, Berliner Sparkasse - Firmen-Center Charlottenburg, Berlin, Germany.
- 2018 "The own skin as a mirror of the ego", a portrait cycle from the Berlin Tattoo Scene. European Month of Photography Berlin, Imago Gallery Moritzplatz, Berlin, Germany
