= Posterior branch of coccygeal nerve =

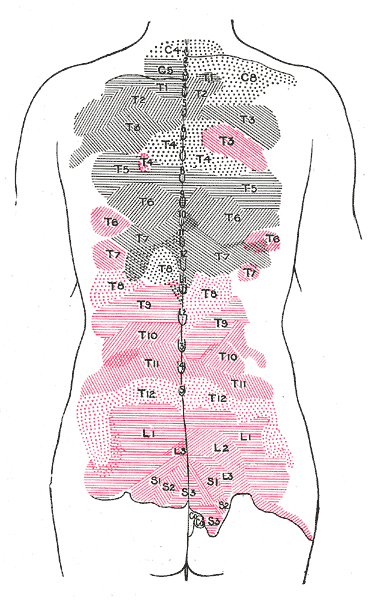
- Areas of distribution of the cutaneous branches of the posterior divisions of the spinal nerves. The areas of the medial branches are in black, those of the lateral in red.

Details
- From: coccygeal nerve

Identifiers
- Latin: ramus posterior nervi coccygei

The posterior division of the coccygeal nerve does not divide into a medial and a lateral branch, but receives a communicating branch from the last sacral; it is distributed to the skin over the back of the coccyx.
