= Twitch Rivals =

Esports tournament and online competitive event

- Game: Fortnite; League of Legends; Teamfight Tactics; Apex Legends; Call of Duty: Warzone; Valorant; Minecraft; Ultimate Marvel vs. Capcom 3 Chess.com; Escape From Tarkov
- Founded: February 28, 2018
- Owner: Twitch
- Venues: Twitch (online); TwitchCon

Twitch Rivals is an esports tournament and online competitive event featuring Twitch streamers and former pro players.

== History ==
=== Twitch Rivals 2018 ===
The first ever Twitch Rivals event was hosted on February 28, 2018. It included 38 events and 800 Twitch affiliates and partners.

=== Twitch Rivals 2019 ===
Twitchcon 2019 hosted a LAN based Twitch Rivals tournament for professional players, streamers, and attendees alike. Several notable celebrities participated in the tournament, including Grayson Allen, Tfue, and Dr DisRespect. In a podcast interview, CapitalistAries (a player who participated at the event) confirmed that the event "featured a wide variety of players, with about a third of the entire convention being involved." The tournament featured Fortnite on Friday, League of Legends (both standard gameplay, and Teamfight Tactics), and Apex Legends. While Twitch Rivals featured a two million dollar prize pool overall, Epic Games (who own Fortnite) supplied one million dollars to pay for the Fortnite tournament.

==== Fortnite ====
The Fortnite Battle Royale tournament included a Top Creator Trios competition, which included many trios, including the following:

- Tfue, flyr, parpy
- 72hrs, cloakzy, TimTheTatman
- Nickmercs, SypherPK, Nate Hill
- symfuhny, bugha, NickEh30
- aydan, DrLupo, seanpcc
- Chap, Vivid, Carose
- kinstaar, hunter, twiks
- gotaga, hhawkers, keolys
- Ceice, Elevate, CouRageJD
- MrSavage, KingRichard, rojo11
- mckyTV, Noward, Benjyfishy
- Myth, Kayuun, collinfrags

The format of this competition featured four four-match-long rounds, with only qualifying teams making it to the final round. The winning trio was the team featuring Tina, Rhux, and 1400pika.

==== League of Legends ====
The 2019 Twitch Rivals event featured two competitions: the NA vs. EU Showmatch, and the Rumble On The Rift tournament. Both tournaments featured a first place cash prize of $20,000, and a second place consolation prize of $5,000.

==== NA vs. EU Showmatch ====
This tournament featured two teams:

- Team NA
  - WingsOfDeath
  - nightblue3
  - anniebot
  - Yvonnie
  - Natsumili
- Team EU
  - GobGG
  - ElOjoNinja
  - NoWay4u_Sir
  - CarritosKami
  - DrFeelGood

==== Rumble on the Rift ====
This tournament featured two teams:

- Team Tyler1
  - Tyler1
  - voyboy
  - Nightblue3
  - Shiphtur
  - LilyPichu
- Team Yassuo
  - Yassuo
  - Boxbox
  - trick2g
  - xfsn_saber
  - Pokimane

=== Twitch Rivals 2023 ===
==== Squid Craft Games 2 ====
Squid Craft Games 2
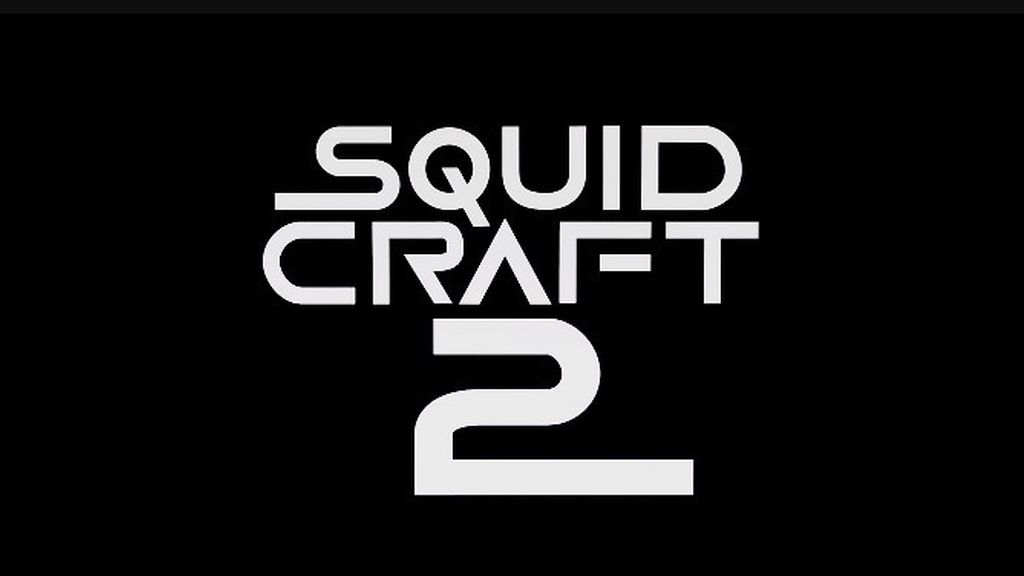
- Date: February 22 – March 5, 2023
- Type: Gaming
- Organised by: Twitch Rivals; Eufonia Studio; Komanche; AuronPlay; el Rubius
- Participants: 200

Squid Craft Games 2 was a Twitch Rivals event based on the Netflix series Squid Game, launched by Eufonia Studio from 28 February to 5 March 2023, and it had 200 participants. The event was carried out in Minecraft. Sapnap was the winner and won US$100,000, while Shadoune came in second.

It was a great success and got 2 millions of viewers during the first days of the event, being the second most followed Twitch Rivals event. It took the fifth position out of eight between the 2023 events in number of followers. It was considered as one of the most attractive streaming event.

===== Participants =====
- E_MasterSensei
- Edurnity
- MirandaIbañez
- Patodeaqualand
- Mizterfilip
- SherezadeMR
- Carola
- AriGameplays
- Rodezel
- Missa Sinfonia
- AlecHernandezC
- RobertoCein
- Barcagamer
- SpreenDMC
- Alanalarana
- elded
- Sekiam
- aXoZer
- Rioboo
- Hasvik
- Pipepunk
- Zeling
- NimuVT
- Wardsess
- BoffeGP
- Luh
- Betra
- Nissaxter
- Robleis
- Tanizen
- MaferRocha
- Eskimalito
- ElChurches
- xCry
- OutConsumer
- tvandeR
- Crisgreen
- Carreraaa
- BersGamer
- Ampeterby7
- Filisgg
- Maau
- ILocochon
- zormanworld
- ElRichMC
- German Garmendia
- D3stri
- Wefere
- Manucraft
- Roier
- SoyPan
- Renrize
- xxxthefocusxxx
- OllieGamerz
- LlunaClark
- Luzu
- Nuvia
- Suzyroxx
- Latesitoo
- Caprimint
- Perxitaa
- Noe9977
- VioletaG
- Reborn_live
- Aroyitt
- Spursito
- Mymtumtum69
- Amablitz
- SugusSusana
- Elxokas
- Aldo_Geo
- Unicornio
- Paracetamor
- Srcheeto
- CooLifeGame
- Reventxz
- Pujidos_90
- Agustin51
- gtv_genesis
- Rivers gg
- Lit Killah
- Zilverk
- Kajalnapalm
- Vicens
- Sofia_Anyway
- LakshartNia
- LittleRagerGirl
- Moyorz87
- RocioDTA
- Delt4Forc3
- Staryuuki
- Manutegaming
- xlightmoonx
- Natalan
- ElZeein
- Conterstine
- LarryCabirria
- ElMariana
- Brianeitor2002
- VickyPalami
- DUXORETHEY
- Silithur
- Paulettee
- Lenay
- Nephtunie
- Shadoune666
- Alecomeco
- bSweetyb
- FapParaMoar
- Bobicraftmc
- champi14
- KarlJacobs
- PUVLOO
- MrKeroro10
- Werlyb
- Mayleen
- Josecristo_
- Karchez
- iAmphy
- Goes_x
- Moxwdf
- Germisse
- MYM_ALKAPONE
- BorjaPavón
- ZellenDust
- ipandarina
- AgenteMaxo
- sirolopez56
- Kidirl
- Espe
- MariusOptimus
- Jelty
- Gemita
- ADN_QC
- TheGrefg
- DeqiuV
- Quackity
- Emikukis
- Josepo_90
- Budcat
- Dylantero
- nilojeda
- imantado
- Cristinini
- MenosTrece
- pollito_senpai
- Ernesbarbeq
- Danielxbox300
- IlloJuan
- Farfadox
- Desst3
- Sarinha_3
- ElFedelobo
- Goncho
- TheDaarick28
- jhdelacruz777
- Knekro
- 8cho
- HITBOXKING
- Brunenger
- Folagorlives
- Neekolulz
- CH14
- JuanSGuarnizo
- Rapturss
- Alexby11
- Jcorko_
- Noni
- Ricoy
- Deargia
- Biyin_
- Ibai
- AuronPlay
- El Rubius
- Komanche
- xQc
- Tubbo
- Amouranth
- TinaKitten
- Tfue
- Moistcritical
- Mictia00
- FoolishGamers
- Loserfruit
- Sylveey
- Dreamer
- GeorgeNotFound
- Sapnap
- Hannahxxrose
- Darizard9
- Pokimane
- Kun Agüero
- Nefarius
- Beniju03
- Elyas360
- ElviraYuki
- TheDonato
- AngieVelasco08
- Pelicanger
- Diffrent

== See also ==
- TwitchCon
