= Cristinini =

Spanish Twitch streamer (born 1989)

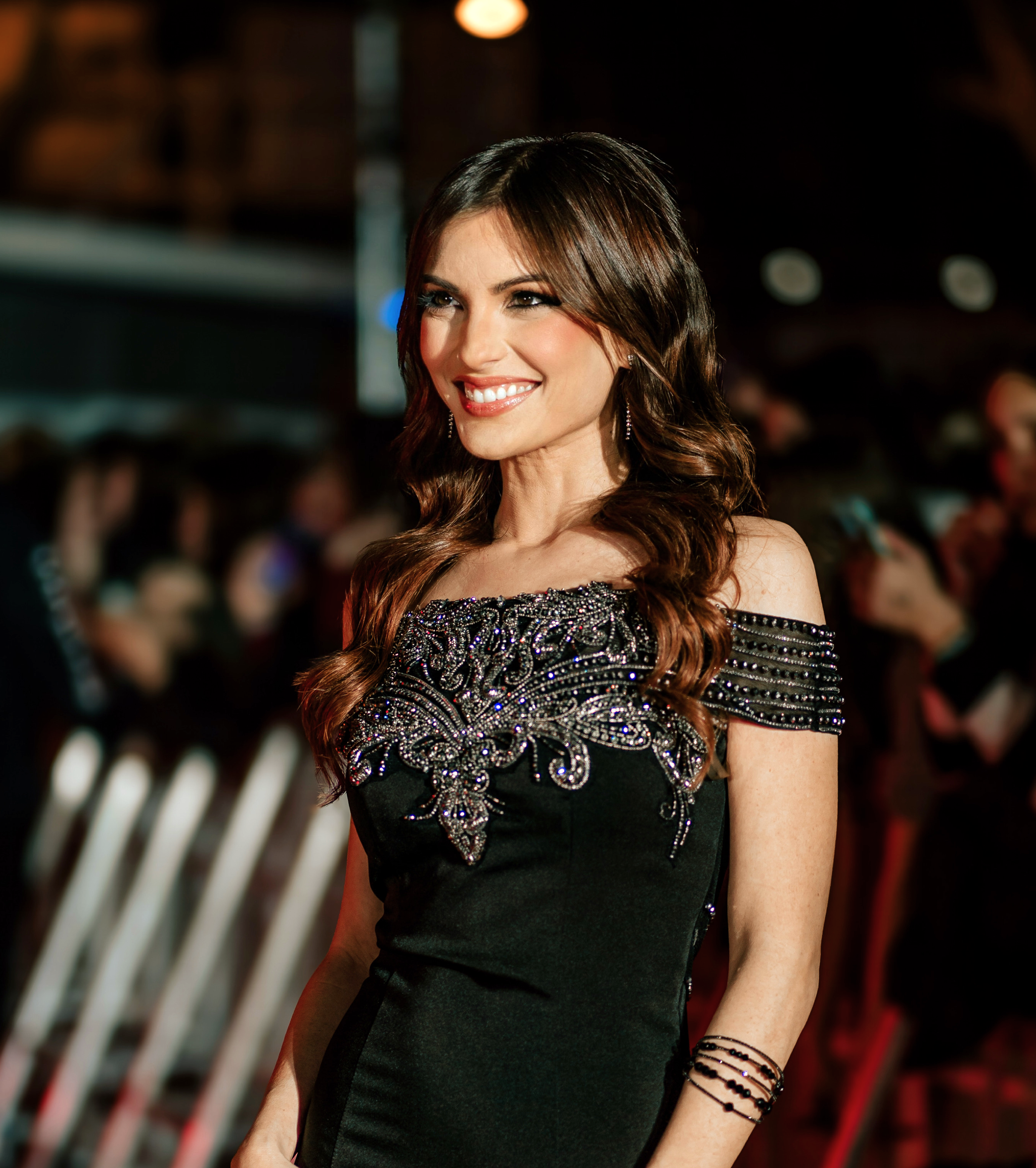
- Cristinini at Premios Ídolo 2023
- Born: Cristina López Pérez; November 15, 1989 (age 37); Province of Tarragona, Spain
- Occupations: Twitch streamer; esports reporter

Twitch information
- Channel: IamCristinini
- Years active: 2017–present
- Genre: Gaming
- Followers: 3.2 million

YouTube information
- Channel: Cristinini
- Years active: 2016–present
- Subscribers: 1.34 million
- Views: 101 million
- Last updated: Sept 4, 2024
- Website: cristininiworld.com

Cristina López Pérez (Province of Tarragona, November 15, 1989), better known as Cristinini, is a Spanish Twitch streamer and esports reporter. She is the host of the Ubeat program "Hoy No Se Sale," as well as a collaborator with Zapeando and Vodafone Yu.

On Twitch, she has more than 3.2 million followers. On YouTube, she has more than 1.3 million subscribers on her main channel. She was named one of the most influential streamers in Spain according to the Forbes list in 2021, she was the fourth most watched female streamer in the world during 2021 and was the winner of the award for best esports reporter in 2021 at the Esland Awards.

== Biography ==
She was born on November 15, 1989, in a town in Tarragona, Spain, and has lived most of her life in Catalonia. She defines herself as "largely Andalusian," thanks to her family branch in Granada.

She studied at the University of Rovira i Virgili in Tarragona. She obtained 2 degrees, 1 master's degree, and 1 higher degree. She has studied computer science and business administration. She is also fluent in five languages, including Russian and French. She started working in various sectors many years ago, including hotel reception, office administration jobs, and even as a sales assistant in a video game chain.

In the esports sector, she has been a presenter and reporter for The Gaming House and presented programs on Meristation and Movistar eSports. After that, she dedicated all of her time to growing Twitch. She is also the presenter of "Hoy no se sale" for the Ubeat platform, in addition to collaborating on Zapeando and Vodafone Yu.

== Career ==
=== Beginnings (2015–2018) ===
She created her YouTube channel on July 19, 2015, under the name "Cristinini," a name that was devised by her friends at the time. She uploaded her first video, called "The World of Social Media," on April 10, 2016.

At that time, in 2016 she decided to quit her job as an accountant to dedicate her life to the world of video games and go to work in a video game store of the GAME chain. She started uploading videos to the YouTube platform more regularly during those dates. Some time later she was chosen to present a section in MeriStation through a casting in which she presented herself with an original and funny idea with the characteristic video of the "Meristation rap". She would be in charge of writing articles and reports about videogames for the portal.

On February 22, 2017, she took the reins of the program "The Gaming House" as host along with Sergio Perela, a program dedicated to esports that showed competitions, information about the teams and their most prominent players, and the latest news in the world of Esports. The program was recorded on the set of Movistar Stadium. She also had a section in Movistar eSports, as a reporter, in which she interviewed esports personalities at events related to them. After 2 seasons and 97 episodes, the Movistar eSports program was closed on December 19, 2018.

On September 8, 2017, she would be a reporter for Movistar eSports at the LCS finals in Paris. On July 8, 2018, she presented the first edition of the Cristal Esports Awards at the Madrid Casino, bringing together the most relevant personalities in the eSports sector, with 14 awardees in different categories in the first edition.

=== Competitions and growth in content creation (2019–2020). ===
On February 8, 2019, she entered the S2V Esports team under the role of "jungler" to compete in the women's leagues of League of Legends, a game to which she had dedicated thousands of hours, thus competing in tournaments such as the Women's Esports League. In August 2019, Cristini closed her time as a player for the S2V team, thus focusing much of her time on streaming on the Twitch platform, a platform on which she had been streaming since 2017 and now resumed more regularly playing various games on stream, including League of Legends, Overwatch, Age of Empires, and many more.

On April 12, 2019, Cristini, who had experience with role-playing games, as she already role-played in several games such as World of Warcraft, discovered the universe of Grand Theft Auto Online. On June 22, 2019, she would participate in the Stars Battle Royale, an event at Gamergy that brought together great content creators in the game Fortnite. At the beginning of the year 2020, she would enter the Elitecraft series, a Minecraft series made by ElRichMC.

Right after, Twitch would receive a large influx of people from different sectors, from soccer to music, in the Among Us era, a time in which Ibai, Ander, Mayichi, Goncho, Cristinini, and other content creators would share discord to play with soccer players like Courtois, Kun Agüero, or Neymar, as well as people from the freestyle world like Papo, Blon, Bta, and many others.

On April 4, 2020, she opened a website dedicated to news, social media updates, and much more. On October 22, Cristini made a video call appearance on Top Gamers Academy, a reality-talent show about Esports, and on October 30, 2020, she reached one million followers on the Twitch platform. On November 5 of the same year, she became one of the new collaborators of Vodafone Yu, a program in which she had previously been a guest.

He would be presenting the GGUP Fest, a festival that brings together people from the worlds of esports, music, and fashion. On December 26, 2020, after having shot scenes of the video months before, she would be part of the "Hispanic Rewind", being one of the faces on the cover of the video in which she would appear in a scene from the game Among Us along with other content creators such as Ibai, Willyrex, Fargan, or TheGrefg.

=== Media appearances and projects (2021–2022) ===
On November 15, 2020, she is interviewed on the program "Hoy No Se Sale" by Ibai and Kapo. Later, on February 3, 2021, Ubeat revealed that Cristini was going to be the new host of "Hoy No Se Sale" together with Kapo for the next seasons of the program. On February 4, 2021, she is invited to La Resistencia to present the new season of her show "Hoy No Se Sale."

On January 25, 2021, I joined Werlyb, Knekro, Illojuan, Barbe, Ander, and Reven in the new project of Ibai. This project encouraged the creation of content among these streamers to facilitate the realization of major events on the Twitch platform.

On March 26, she appears in one of the episodes of the Spanish illusionist Antonio Diaz's program "Magic for Humans Spain with El Mago Pop" on the Netflix platform. Days later, on April 9, 2021, she began to collaborate with the Zapeando television program on La Sexta. In her section, she would begin to talk about all the news about the Internet, video games, and booming platforms such as Twitch.

In April, she started Marbella Vice, a GTA Roleplay series, and managed to become the first female streamer in the world ranking for a week in May.

On July 18, she starts her dubbing classes at Polford Studios in Barcelona, with great masters of the dubbing world such as Luis Posada, Óscar Barberán or Jordi Brau. On the same day, she appears on "El Padel de las Estrellas," conducting interviews with celebrities such as Piqué. At the end of the same month, it was announced that she would play alongside Rubius in PogChamps4, a chess tournament with 100,000 in prizes starting on August 29. She started preparing with Anna Rudolf, a chess caster and player. After beating several of her opponents in her group and qualifying for the winner's bracket, she was defeated in the knockout round.

On October 5, 2021, she made an appearance as a field reporter in traditional sports for DAZN's platform at the Johan Cruyff Stadium, broadcasting the FC Barcelona vs Arsenal match in the UEFA Women's Champions League.

On October 21, 2021, her book "Gamers en Lios" was published, where she recounts her adventures on what seems like a normal day, until a mysterious package with a code arrives at her door. In it, the reader, accompanied by her companions, must make decisions that will affect the story and lead to one of many endings. On the 25th, they announced the "TWITCH RIVALS Doritos Disruptor Series ft. Cristinini", the only Spanish streamer to have its own Twitch Rivals with a format of several games, including Geometry Dash, Fall Guys, Overcooked 2, Aimlabs, Jackbox Games, and finally Chess, in case of a tiebreaker.

On September 21, 2021, the Pull and Bear brand announced that she would present her event for the 30th anniversary of the brand in a broadcast in which she would have Guillermo Campra and Inés Hernand as guests. On the 30th of the same month, she presents on her channel the 10th anniversary event of Amazon in Spain, with Luján Argüelles as master of ceremonies, along with singer Xuso Jones. On November 7, during an interview on LaSexta, she analyzed the success of esports and talked about the potential of the world of e-sports in the future.

On December 4, 2021, the soccer player Alexia Putellas, after being named the winner of the Golden Ball in 2021, agreed to give an interview for the DAZN platform. On the 17th of the same month, she premiered her documentary "Domino's Originals: Cristinini" on the Mapfre stage at Gamergy. It is a documentary that compiles her career in the world of e-sports and content creation. The year ended with her appearance for the second time, characterization of her character from the Marbella Vice series in the "Hispanic Rewind". This same year, she had almost doubled the number of followers on Twitch, placing her with a figure of 2.7 million followers. 14.7 million hours of her live content had been viewed and she had a peak of 48 thousand viewers at a time. All this transformed Cristini into the ninth most watched streamer in Spain and the fourth most watched female in the world.

On January 17, 2022, she attended the Esland Awards, awards dedicated to content creation and at which she was nominated for best roleplayer and best esports reporter, of which she was the winner of the latter. On January 19, she participated in the Twitch Rivals event of Squid Games in the game Minecraft along with 147 other participants for a prize of 100,000 dollars. After passing several tests, she fell on the final day, thus entering the top 10. On February 8, she will be awarded as Cybercooperator of Honor 2022 at a conference organized by INCIBE for International Safer Internet Day.

=== El Grand Prix (2023) ===
Since the summer of 2023 she is the co-presenter alongside Ramón García and Michelle Calvó in the TV programm El Grand Prix by Televisión Española.

== Media appearances ==
=== Television ===
Year	Program	Channel	Role
2021-presente	Hoy no se sale	U-Beat	Host
2021-presente	Zapeando	LaSexta	Collaborator
2017–2018	The Gaming House	Movistar+	Host
2021	El Intermedio	La Sexta	Guest
2021	La Resistencia	Movistar+	Guest
2023	Time Zone	HBO	Host

=== Radio ===
Year	Program	Channel	Role
8 de febrero de 2021	Más de uno	Onda Cero	Guest
19 de enero de 2022	Tarde lo que tarde	RTVE	Guest

=== Other platforms ===
Year	Program	Channel	Role
2021-presente	Vodafone Yu	Twitch	Collaborator
2017–2018	Movistar Esports	YouTube	Host
2016–2017	Meristation	YouTube	Host

=== Esports ===
Year	Event	Role
2017	Gamergy	Host
2018	Premios Cristal	Host

Year	Videogame	Event	Role
2018	Gran Turismo	Gran Turismo Championship	Host
2018	Fifa	Copa Esports	Host
2018	Fifa	Fut Champion Cup	Host
2018	Moto GP	Moto GP Esports Championship	Host
2018	Fifa	Ultimate Team Championship Series	Host
2018	League of Legends	LCS EU	Host
2018	Fortnite	YouTube Battle Royale	Player

Year	Videogame	Event	Role	Team
2019	League of Legends	Women's Esports League	Player	S2V

Year	Channel	Headline	Role
2021	LaSexta	Cristinini analiza el éxito de los Esports	Guest

=== Traditional sports ===
Date	Event	Channel	Role
5 October 2021	Liga de Campeones Femenina de la UEFA: Barcelona vs Arsenal	DAZN	Host
4 December 2021	Entrevista a Alexia Putellas, ganadora del balón de oro	DAZN	Host

=== Documentaries ===
Date	Name	Channel/Program
17 December 2021	Mi historia	YouTube / Domino's Originals

== Publications ==
On October 21, 2021, Cristinini published her book Gamers en líos, an interactive book of the "choose your own adventure" genre that readers must complete by making decisions that will lead them to different situations and subsequently affect the end of the book, the book has several endings.

== Awards and nominations ==
Year	Award	Category	Result	Ref
2020	Oscar de los esports	Best Actress	Nominated	
2020	PremiosDeVuego	Best female streamer	Won	
2021	InfluencersAwards	Gaming	Nominated	
2022	Esland Awards	Best sports reporter	Won	
2022	Esland Awards	Best roleplayer	Nominated	
2022	SID	Honorary Cybercooperator	Won	
2025	Gen Z Awards	Streamer of the Year	Won	
2026	Gran Cruz de la Orden del Mérito Civil		Won	

== Honours ==
- Grand Cross of the Order of Civil Merit (2026)
