= Germán Garmendia =

Chilean YouTuber, comedian, and writer (born 1990)

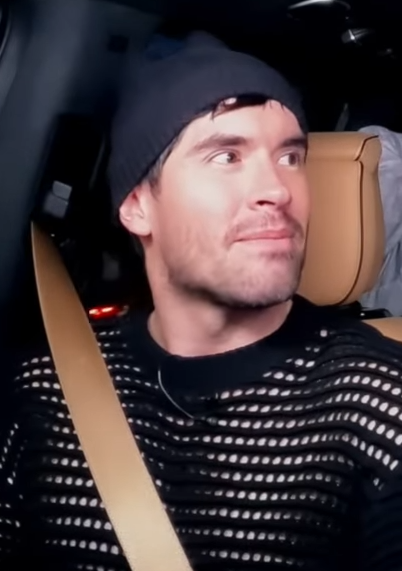
- Garmendia in 2023
- Born: Germán Alejandro Garmendia Aranis; April 25, 1990 (age 36); Copiapó, Chile
- Occupations: YouTuber; singer-songwriter; comedian; writer
- Partner: Lenay Chantelle Olsen (2016–present)
- Parents: † Germán Luis Garmendia Macías (father); Cecilia del Carmen Aranis Mancilla (mother)

YouTube information
- Channels: HolaSoyGerman.; JuegaGerman
- Years active: 2006–present
- Genres: Video blogs; let's play; sketch comedy
- Subscribers: JuegaGerman 56.4 million HolaSoyGerman 44.6 million
- Views: JuegaGerman 18.92 billion HolaSoyGerman 4.98 billion
- Last updated: 16 August 2026

Germán Alejandro Garmendia Aranis (Spanish pronunciation: [xeɾˈman aleˈxandɾo ɣaɾˈmendja aˈɾanis]; (Note: In isolation, after a pausa or after an /n/, Garmendia is pronounced [ɡaɾˈmendja].) born April 25, 1990) is a Chilean YouTuber, singer-songwriter, comedian and writer. He became famous for his YouTube channel HolaSoyGerman, which uploaded humorous videos about everyday situations. In 2013, he created his gameplay channel, JuegaGerman which, over time, would surpass his previous channel in subscribers.

In 2016, he became the first YouTuber to receive two Diamond plates, and outside his YouTube career, he formed a musical career with bands like Zudex, Feeling Every Sunset, and Ancud; he also released several songs in his solo career. In April 2016, he released his first book, #ChupaElPerro. Another book, Di Hola, was released in 2018. He has received praise for his YouTube channels. In the MTV Millennial Awards, he won the Digital Icon and Master Gamer categories in 2014 and 2015, respectively. He was listed as one of the biggest YouTube stars by The Washington Post, one of the most popular by BBC, and one of the most influential in Time magazine.

On May 16, 2024, the JuegaGerman channel became the First Hispanic Channel to surpass 50 Million subscribers. It was also the first Spanish-language YouTube channel to receive the "Ruby Play Button" award, given to creators for surpassing that number of subscribers.

Currently, his JuegaGerman channel is the 73rd channel in the world and has 53.2 million subscribers. He is also the sixth most-subscribed YouTuber in Spanish, behind the El Salvadorian channel "Alfredo Larin." He is currently the most-subscribed YouTuber in Chile.

== Early life ==
Germán Alejandro Garmendia Aranis was born on April 25, 1990, in Copiapó, Chile, and lived there until he was 12 years old. In 1993, when he was three, his father, Germán Luis Garmendia, died in a car crash on Christmas Eve. After the death of his father, he, his mother Cecilia del Carmen Aranis, and his brother Diego Garmendia traveled across the country until they settled in Los Vilos, a coastal city located to the north of Santiago, where he lived much of his adolescent life. In that town he met his first love, to whom he dedicated a song called "Para Ti". He had originally planned to study civil engineering, however he never carried it out.

At 13, he and his brother and some friends formed a Pop rock band called Zudex. In 2006, he would start his career as a YouTuber by uploading videos of his band. They made several presentations in youth festivals and schools, achieving some renown in that field. Individual obligations and responsibilities precipitated the end of the band. In the early 2010s, he was the vocalist of his next group Feeling Every Sunset.

== Career ==
On September 9, 2011, he uploaded HolaSoyGerman's first video titled Las cosas obvias de la vida (lit. "The obvious things in life"). The videos on the channel consisted of humorous monologues talking about everyday life situations. In an interview with BBC Mundo, he stated that "The humor I do on YouTube is quite innocent. I've always liked making people laugh by making fun of myself, never of others." In 2013, he created another YouTube channel called JuegaGerman, where he mainly uploads gameplay videos and other content.

A Spanish YouTuber named YoLordestructor uploaded a video accusing him of using bots to artificially boost his subs. He cite a deleted video from HolaSoyGerman, Internet y Redes Sociales, in which it displayed various websites marked as AddSocials, YouLikeHits and SocialClump, which are allegedly for using bots. Days later, he uploaded another video in which he accused Germán of having deleted his previous video due to copyright claims. Later, other YouTubers such as the Mexican Diego de La Mattaz known as Diego Mexivergas and the Chilean Xodaaa uploaded videos giving the accusations as true. On August 24, 2013, he uploaded a video responding to these accusations, claiming they were false, which racked up over four million views before being removed. In that same year, he uploaded the HolaSoyGerman most popular video titled Los Hermanos. At the end of 2013, through his channel HolaSoyGerman, which by then had 12 million subscribers, he became the YouTuber with the second most subscribers, only behind PewDiePie, according to data provided by YouTube Rewind. In August 2014 he won the "Digital Icon" category from MTV Millennial Awards.

In April 2014, he was scheduled to appear at the Telmex Aldea Digital in Zócalo, Mexico City. The event had many problems, the talk he gave did not have a good sound, the tent was filled with many more people than it could bear. People pushed each other and those who tried to enter were injured. After the Secretary of Public Security of the Government of the Federal District regained control of the situation, the crowd dispersed and the event was cancelled. In 2015 he went together with El Rubius and other YouTubers to the Club Media Fest. In October 2015, Jack Black appeared in a video titled Tipos de alumnos (transl. "Types of students") to publicize the movie Goosebumps. In March 2016, the Canadian rock band, Simple Plan was featured in the intro of a video entitled La Comida. In April 2016, he would reach 10 million subscribers in his two main channels HolaSoyGerman and JuegaGerman, which led him to be the first YouTuber to obtain two Diamond plates. In June 2016, he won the category "Master Gamer" from MTV Millennial Awards, at the Pepsi Center WTC in Mexico City.

On November 20, 2016, he uploaded their last HolaSoyGerman video, Como Encontrar Trabajo. In a JuegaGerman video titled Esto pasa si busco mi nombre en YouTube, he explained that the reason for this decision was due to the extensive process that each video on that channel required for him to create, stating that sometimes it took more than 22 hours. This statement was in response to a Spanish YouTuber who accused him of taking drugs to make his videos. By 2018, he was the fifth most popular YouTuber on the platform. In August 2018 he won in the Favorite Gamer category of the Mexico Kids' Choice Awards.

In September 2018, the Facebook page Paradero UAH posted a two-minute excerpt from a JuegaGerman video from August 30, 2014, titled OH POR DIOS, SOY EMO, in which while playing Beyond: Two Souls, he begins to say comments that were branded as misogynistic, disgusting and sexist. The clip became viral through social networks. Several days later, he uploaded a video entitled Una Disculpa Y Reflexión Para Seguir Avanzando, in which he apologized for comments made in the 2014 video. Alex Christiansen from La Tercera criticized the video.

In 2019, his HolaSoyGerman channel, which until then had 37 million, was in a confrontation for being the Spanish-speaking channel with the most subscribers worldwide with the Mexican company Badabun, who would end up surpassing him in subscribers that same year. In 2020, JuegaGerman reached 40 million subscribers and, in October of the same year, surpassed HolaSoyGerman. In October 2021, he won the Legend Award at the Eliot Awards for his long history on YouTube. In May 2022, JuegaGerman surpassed Badabun in subscribers. In 2023, he won the Best Lifetime Achievement category at the Premios ESLAND, hosted by Spanish YouTuber TheGrefg. On September 26 of the same year, Garmendia set himself a challenge, which was based on having the short with the most comments on the YouTube platform, the video "NECESITO TU AYUDA" (lit. I NEED YOUR HELP), until August 2024 he managed to position himself in seventh place.

In April 2024, HolaSoyGerman's channel was hacked, alarming its fans, but thanks to YouTube's moderation, the channel was able to quickly recover. On May 16, 2024, JuegaGerman reaches 50 million subscribers, becoming the first Spanish-language channel to achieve this, which in turn made him the first Hispanic YouTuber to obtain the Ruby Play Button. Long after this achievement, he lost the position of most subscribed Hispanic creator against Fede Vigevani. That same year, Garmendia gave more priority to shorts, uploading many of these which quickly became very viral, until December 2024 this format represented 15% of the total views of the JuegaGerman channel. In 2025, in a short titled "¿Cuál fue mi PRIMER comentario?" (lit. What was my FIRST comment?). He quickly showed his Ruby Play Button, and then in a video titled "Rompiendo RÉCORDS Mundiales FÁCILES" (lit. Breaking EASY World RECORDS), he showed his 50 Million button again, thanking for the award and the support.

== YouTube channels ==
Channels
Channel name	Year of creation	Videos	Status	Category	Subscribers	Views	YouTube Creator Awards				Ref.
Zudex	2006	12 videos	Idle	Music	63 K	+3.61 Million	—	—	—	—	
FeelingEverySunset	2010	9 videos	Idle	Music	235 K	+13.58 Million	100.000				
German Garmendia	2010	9 videos	Idle	Music	1.74 Million	+39.58 Million	100.000	1.000.000			
HolaSoyGerman.	2011	136 videos	Idle	Entertainment	44.5 Million	+4.97 Billion	100.000	1.000.000	10.000.000		
HolaSoyGerman2	2011	11 videos	Idle	Entertainment	3.24 Million	+44.16 Million	100.000	1.000.000			
JuegaGerman	2013	2.304 videos	Active	Gaming	55.2 Million	+18.25 Billion	100.000	1.000.000	10.000.000	50.000.000	
Ancud	2016	25 videos	Idle	Music	1.91 Million	+141.40 Million	100.000	1.000.000			
GermanComiendo	2020	1 video	Idle	Entertainment	107 K	+572 K	100.000				
Juanito Alcachofa	2022	1 video	Idle	Entertainment	328 K	+1.81 Million	100.000				
El Baúl de Germán	2023	53 videos	Idle	Gaming	540 K	+45.41 Million	100.000				
Total	+18 years on YouTube	2.561 Videos	Active	Gaming, Entertainment and Music	107.86 Million	+23.29 Billion	9 Silver Play Button	5 Gold Play Button	2 Diamon Play Button	1 Ruby Play Button	
Total	+18 years on YouTube	2.561 Videos	Active	Gaming, Entertainment and Music	107.86 Million	+23.29 Billion	17 YouTube Play Buttons (currently).				
Last Update: April 18, 2026

=== Notes ===
- "HolaSoyGerman" is Germán Garmendia's main channel, featuring comedy sketches.
- "JuegaGerman" is his secondary channel, it's dedicated to gaming.
- Zudex, FeelingEverySunset, Ancud, and Germán Garmendia. are music channels.
- The channels "GermanComiendo" and "Juanito Alcachofa" were created to parody Mukbang-style videos and videos from the channel "Luz Maria: Historias de Vida.
- The channels "HolaSoyGerman2" and "El Baúl de Germán" were created to upload additional content that he couldn't upload on his main channels, as he wanted to create exclusive content for them.

== Writing career ==
On April 5, 2016, he uploaded a promotional video of his book #ChupaElPerro: Uno que otro consejo, which would not be officially released until April 28 of that same year, edited by Penguin Random House, Altea and Alfaguara publishers. His book is a self-help manual where he gives "Germansejos", jokes and anecdotes. The title phrase "Chupa el perro" (lit. 'suck the dog') is of Chilean origin and subtle refers to oral sex. Under the slang used in HolaSoyGerman it means "¡vete al carajo!" (lit. 'go to hell!'). He later toured Latin America to promote it; On April 23, he participated in the Bogotá International Book Fair, in Colombia, signing more than 100,000 copies during twelve hours, in which more than 50,000 people attended. What caused him a health decompensation, being transferred to a care center to recover. During his visit to the forty-two edition of the Buenos Aires International Book Fair on May 7 in La Rural, he sold more than 8,000 copies.

The first print run consisted of 170,000 copies and by mid-May it was practically exhausted in Spain, Colombia, Mexico and Argentina. In Chile, 30,000 copies were sold, for which a second edition of 20,000 was ordered. By February 2017, it sold more than 43,000 copies in that country. On May 14, he held a book signing day at the La Cúpula Theater, located inside O'Higgins Park, in which 3,000 people registered for that event. On May 16, it became the best-selling Chilean non-fiction book. On June 11, he made a promotional visit in Bicentennial Park, Mexico, in which more than 7 thousand people attended, of which 4,500 acquired signed copies of the book.

In December 2017 he announced that he would write a second book and in the second half of 2018 he wrote a contract with Planeta Group.

In September 2018, he announced the release of his fictional novel, Di Hola, which is "a moving story about loyalty, love and friendship" starring Oscar and Natalie. It was released on October 9, 2018, in Ibero-America. Later he made promotional visits in Bogota on October 26 and Lima on November 2.

== Music career ==
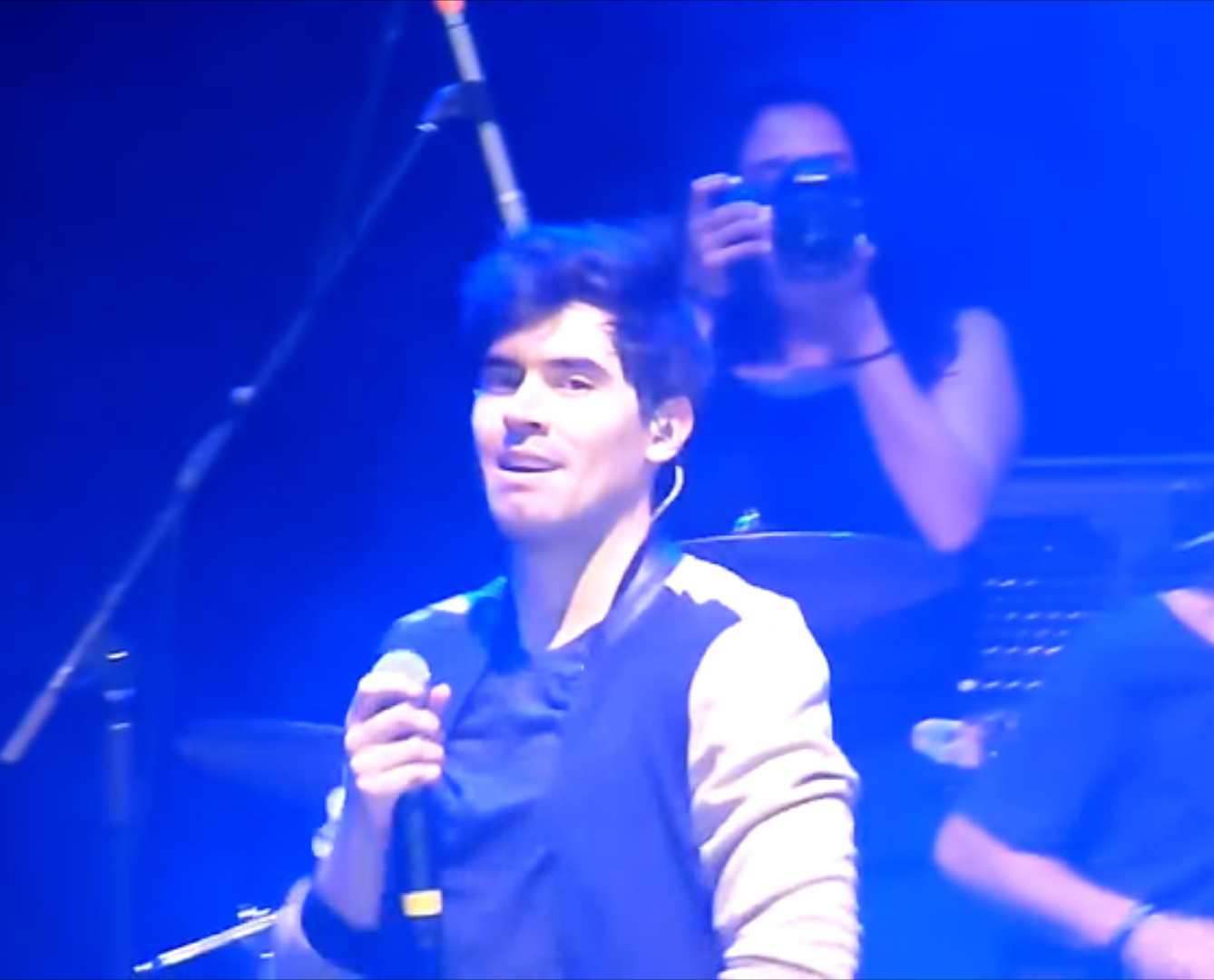
Garmendia at the Colosseum Theater, 2017

He was vocalist for the band Ancud, made up of both him and his brother Diego. whose name was given in honor of the namesake city of Chiloé. On April 5, 2016, they released a four-track EP, Así es Normal. On November 12, 2016, he announced via Twitter that he would be present at the third Club Media Fest that would take place on December 10 of that year, in Club de Gimnasia y Esgrima de Buenos Aires. On November 22, they posted on his band's official account the music video for "Cambia", a song with "quite soft guitars and melodies with German on the microphone."

In March 2017, Ancud was nominated in Best South Region Artist and Revelation Artist categories in the third edition of the Heat Latin Music Awards. In April, they released the studio album, Se hacen realidad, which contains 4 songs from the previous EP, Así es normal plus another 3 new songs, including the homonymous single that, like "Cambia", had a promotional video clip.

They also announced a live concert at the Caupolicán Theatre on November 4, 2017, as part of the Latin American tour Se hacen realidad Tour, charging 40,000 pesos per court, 28,000 for the lower stalls and 15,000 for the upper stalls. In La Tercera, Paul Quinteros criticized the admission prices stating that charging for 40 thousand pesos was a "massive impudence". Later, due to logistical issues, the concert was moved to the Colosseum Theater, keeping the same date, and charging the same prices as before.

He continued her musical career as a solo artist. His first track was released in September 2018, a cover of Ansel Elgort's song "Supernova." His next release was "Tregua" in March 2020, featuring Wiinter. His song "Plan B" was released in September of that year and reached number 123 on the Puerto Rican charts. In December 2020, he released "Simplemente Perfecta." At the end of December 2021, he announced the release of her new song, "Titán", on January 6, 2022, on their official music accounts, reaching number six on the Chilean charts for four weeks. In August of that same year, he released "Bajo la Lluvia." His most recent release was "TKM."

== Other works ==
In August 2014, he uploaded in HolaSoyGerman, Agua para Africa (lit. 'Water for Africa'), in which he shows his support for a non-profit campaign known as Agua Mi Caridad, whose main objective was to raise $100,000 to help the northern region of Sahel. In September of that year $72,000 was raised. In June 2015, he was the protagonist in an advertisement for the Mexican snack brand Crujitos. In 2016 he dubbed Julian's voice in Ice Age: Collision Course in Latin Spanish, whose character was described by Garmendia himself as "loud and scandalous".

In June 2016, he attended the Rio de Janeiro 2016 Olympic Games, running for more than 200 meters holding the Olympic flame at Foz do Iguaçu, before passing it to Calu Rivero. The inclusion of both in the 2016 Olympic Games generated quite a bit of controversy, and also received a lot of criticism. Chilean digital newspaper El Dínamo questioned the inclusion of Garmendia in said tour, wondering if "there was no one else in Chile." In January 2017, he and the developer HsG Games published German Quest, an exclusive video game for Smartphones with Android operating system. The game initially garnered between 17,000 and 100,000 downloads.

In March 2017, he and his brother boarded the Rainbow Warrior III ship and visited the communes of Ancud, Chiloé and Pudeto to support Greenpeace's campaign, "Salvemos los mares del fin del mundo", whose objective was the protection of the oceans of the southern area of the Americas.

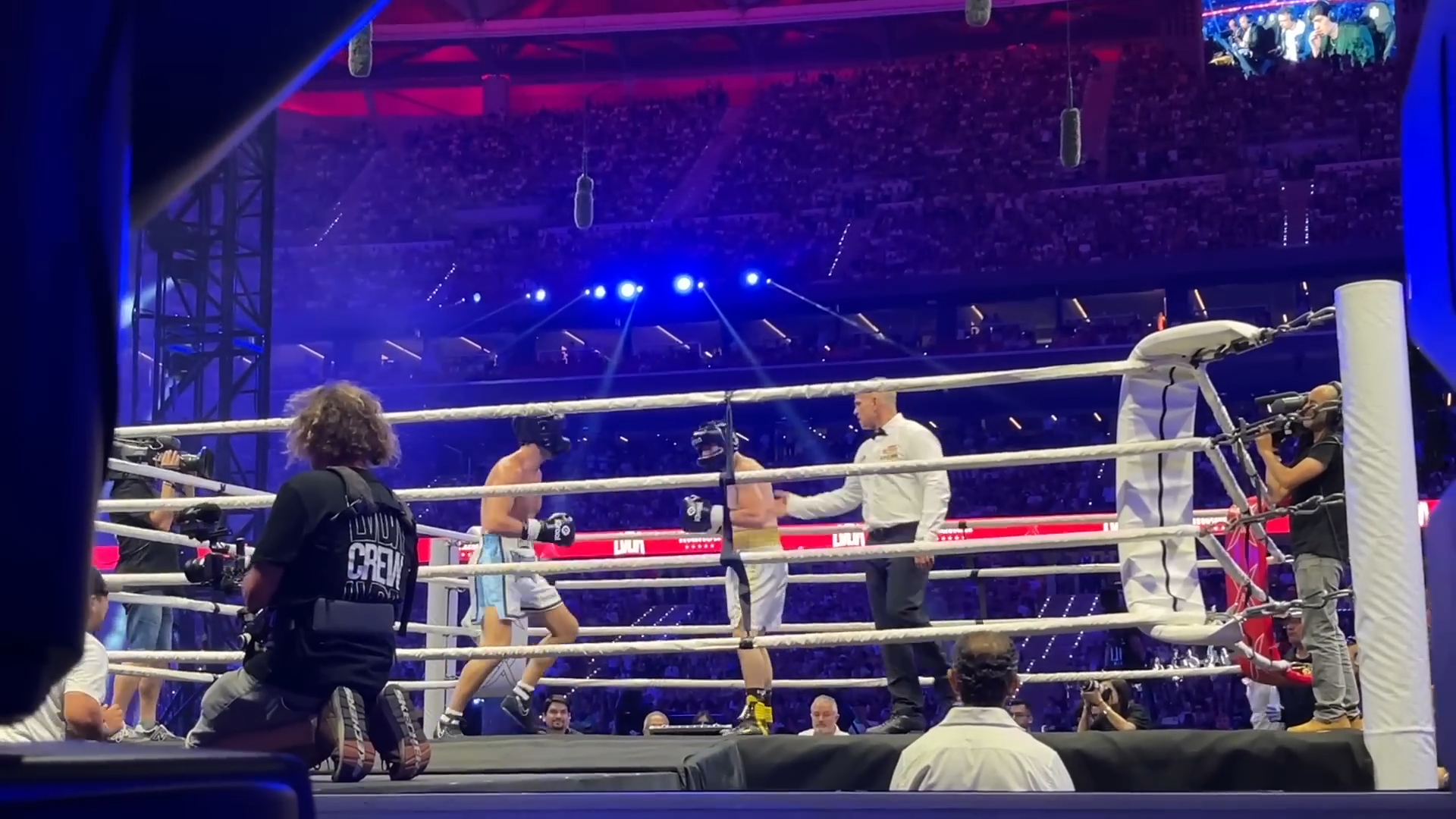
Garmendia at the Velada del Año 3

Since April 9, 2018, he was Chilean ambassador of the Make-A-Wish Foundation. In December 2021, he made an appearance in the Digital Table of the Teletón, in which he donated 30,000,000 Chilean pesos on behalf of the Antofagasta region. He also participated in an episode of the show Socios de la Hamburguesa, directed by Pancho Saavedra. In it, he dedicated himself to chatting with Saavedra, Jorge Zabaleta and Pedro Ruminot, the latter stated that he contacted Germán to appear in an old CHV program, El club de comedia. In 2023 he was invited to participate in La Velada del Año 3 of the Spanish streamer Ibai Llanos, where he would face off against the Argentine streamer Coscu in a boxing match on July 1. During the boxing match, he lost by knockout to Coscu. In December 2023, he was invited by Gerard Piqué to be the president of a Kings League team, naming his team Real Titán. On November 4, 2024, Garmendia, Fede Vigevani, Ricky Limón, and other teammates visited MrBeast's offices and took advantage of the meeting to create content for their respective channels. In January 2025, he traveled to Dubai to give a talk at the 1 Billion Followers Summit, where he discussed his career, successes, failures, content creation tips, and more.

On April 5, 2025, Garmendia was invited to participate in "YouTube Basketball Stars", a friendly event hosted by Fede Vigevani and MrBeast, that brings together the biggest Hispanic-speakers creators to compete against the biggest English-speaking creators. The game took place on April 25, his teammates were Fernanfloo, Ricky Limón, Ian Lucas, Ibai Llanos, Elvis Ude (thatkidelvis), Eladio Carrión and Manu Ginóbili, who was the coach of the Spanish team. They faced MrBeast, Mark Rober, Chandler Hallow, Alex Stokes, Alan Stokes, Faze Rug, Marlon Lundgren (marlon3lg), Nick Nayersina and D'Vontay Friga, who was the coach of the English team. The game ended with a victory for the Americans, with a score of 65 to 55.

Garmendia, on May 4, 2025, participated in the Wings For Life World Run, a charity event that seeks to raise the largest amount of money to help research cures for spinal cord injuries. It brings together people from all over the world to run. A vehicle chases the competitors. The one who is not caught is the winner. He also invited to everyone to run in the event to help the cause.

== Personal life ==
In November 2015, he uploaded a twenty-minute video to JuegaGerman in which he talked about how an alleged "obsessed fan" had threatened to kill people close to him. In 2015, he ended his relationship with Mexican YouTuber Allison Smith and returned to Chile. On May 29, 2016, he uploaded a video entitled Mi novia (lit. 'My Girlfriend'), in which he reveals his relationship with Lenay Chantelle Olsen, also known as Lele.

In a video from November 21, 2016, titled Mi Historia de Bullying (lit. 'My Bullying Story'), he spoke about the bullying that he suffered because of his thinness. In March 2017, during his stay in Chile, he uploaded the video "Esto tiene que parar... por favor" (lit. This has to stop... please), in which he talks about all the harassment he and his girlfriend had received from some fans.

In 2021, he returned to live in Chile for a time. During his stay, he continued creating content for JuegaGerman and gave a few interviews. In December of that same year, he appeared on Teletón Chile (an annual charity television event held in that country), to which he contributed a donation of 30 million Chilean pesos (approximately $32,000). In 2022 he returned to live in the United States.

On January 1, 2025, he and Lenay were celebrating New Year's on Bourbon Street of New Orleans. At 3:00 a.m., they left the to rest. Shortly after, at 3:15 a.m., a terrorist attack would take place, leaving more than 15 dead and dozens injured. This news alarmed his followers, who knew they were there. After a while, Germán assimilated what had happened and decided to speak out. He clarified the matter, stating that they were fine. Among their explanations, he stated that they were lucky to have left minutes before the conflict, since their intention was to continue celebrating there.

== Public image and legacy ==
He has been considered the most important YouTuber in Latin America. Notimérica explained that in its content it uses the performance of various characters in some scenes as a "characteristic resource" to give the videos "great dynamism." In April 2013, he was listed in a New York Times article, and in July 2015, he was chosen as the second YouTube's biggest star from the Washington Post, both claiming that their earnings were 1.3 million dollars per year. Business Insider also estimated that he earned $2 million. He denied being a millionaire in an exclusive interview with the Informe Especial program: "People rely a lot on the CPM in the United States, which is the cost per thousand visits, something that we don't have. If in the United States and United Kingdom it's 14 dollars, we have 0.5 dollars."

In December 2016, he was listed as one of the highest-paid YouTube stars by Forbes, stating that he earned 5.5 million and being the only Latin American YouTuber on the list. In January 2018, the BBC chose him as the second most popular YouTuber, and in June 2018, Wired highlighted his aspirations to act, write, and direct in Hollywood during his stay in Los Angeles in 2017. On July 16, 2019, he was listed as one of the 25 Most Influential People on the Internet by Time. In September 2020, the Monitor Information Agency listed him as one of the most profitable vloggers. In 2022, a CashNetUSA study noted that he would have an estimated income of $28,761,924.

== Personal records on YouTube ==
- "Los Hermanos" (lit. The Brothers) is HolaSoyGerman's most-viewed video, with over 146 million views.
- "Si me río se acaba el video" (lit. If i laugh the video ends) is JuegaGerman's most-viewed (Short) video, with over 106 million views.
- "NECESITO TU AYUDA 🌎" (lit. I NEED YOUR HELP) by JuegaGerman is the fifth most-commented YouTube Short in the world, with 3,200,000 comments.
- HolaSoyGerman is the inactive channel with the most subscribers in the world, the last video was uploaded on November 20, 2016.
- JuegaGerman is the fourth most-subscribed gaming channel in the world.
- Between June 2015 and November 2017, HolaSoyGerman was the 2nd most-subscribed YouTube channel, behind only PewDiePie.
- In 2016, he became the first YouTuber in the world to earn two Diamond Play Button.
- Between 2017 and 2019, JuegaGerman was the fourteenth (14th) most subscribed channel on YouTube.
- In 2020, he became the first YouTuber in the world to have two channels surpass 40 million subscribers.
- In May 2024, with his JuegaGerman channel, he became the first Spanish-language YouTuber to reach 50 million subscribers and earn the Ruby Play Button.
- Germán Garmendia, with HolaSoyGerman and later JuegaGerman, held the Top 1 Hispanic Individual Creators list for 11 years and 3 months, from February 2013 to May 21, 2024. He has held the top spot in Chile's Top 1 from 2012 to the present.
- Throughout his long career and through his various channels, he has earned 17 YouTube Play Button to date. These recognitions include: 9 Silver Play Button, 5 Gold Play Button, 2 Diamond Play Button, and a Ruby Play Button.
- The JuegaGerman and HolaSoyGerman channels, combined, have generated 100 million subscriptions and over 23.35 billion views.
- He is the forty-third (43rd) most followed person in the world, with over 180 million followers across all his social media platforms, including YouTube, TikTok, Instagram, Facebook, X/Twitter, and Twitch.

== Awards and nominations ==
Year	Award	Category	Result	Ref.
2018	Argentina Kids' Choice Awards	Favorite Gamer	Nominated	
2021	Eliot Awards	Leyend Award	Won	
2023	ESLAND Awards	Best Trajectory	Won	
2017	Heat Latin Music Awards	Best South Region Artist	Nominated	
2017	Heat Latin Music Awards	Revelation Artist	Nominated	
2018	Mexico Kids' Choice Awards	Favorite Gamer	Won	
2019	Mexico Kids' Choice Awards	Favorite Gamer	Nominated	
2020	Mexico Kids' Choice Awards	Favorite Gamer	Nominated	
2022	Mexico Kids' Choice Awards	Chilean Celebrity	Nominated	
2023	Mexico Kids' Choice Awards	Trajectory Award	Won	
2023	Mexico Kids' Choice Awards	Chilean Celebrity	Won	
2014	MTV Millennial Awards	Digital Icon	Won	
2015	MTV Millennial Awards	Master Gamer	Won	
2016	MTV Millennial Awards	Master Gamer	Won	
2016	Streamy Awards	International	Won	

== Filmography ==
Year	Title	Role	Version
2016	Ice Age: Collision Course	Julian	Latin Spanish dubbing

== Discography ==
=== Studio albums and EPs ===
- 2006: Hecho en Casa (EP as Zudex)
- 2007: Punto De Partida (EP as Zudex)
- 2008: Mil Sueño (EP as Zudex)
- 2009: Rande Rande (EP as Zudex)
- 2011: Homemade (EP as German Garmendia)
- 2011: Die Trying (EP as Feeling Every Sunset)
- 2014: Cuando Desees Recordar Mi Voz (EP as Feeling Every Sunset)
- 2016: Así Es Normal (EP as Ancud)
- 2017: Se Hacen Realidad (Studio album as Ancud)

=== Singles ===
Title	Year	Chart positions	
Title	Year	CHI	PR
"Cambia (Remix)" (as Ancud)	2017	—	—
"Supernova (COVER)"	2018	—	—
"Cantando Comentarios" (as JuegaGerman)	2018	—	—
"Excepcional" (as Ancud)	2019	—	—
"Jovenes" (as Ancud)	2019	—	—
"Tregua"	2020	—	—
"Plan B"	2020	—	123
"Simplemente Perfecta"	2020	—	—
"Titán"	2022	6	—
"Bajo la Lluvia"	2022	—	—
"Tkm"	2022	—	—

== Works ==
- (2016) #ChupaElPerro: Uno que otro consejo. Penguin Random House. ISBN 978-956-958-365-0.
- (2018) Di Hola. Planeta. ISBN 978-956-360-492-4.

== Bibliography ==
- Hall, Kevin (July 15, 2019). Germán Garmendia: Star Chilean Gamer with 10 Billion+ Views. The Rosen Publishing Group, Inc. ISBN 978-1-7253-4608-6.

== See also ==
- List of most-subscribed YouTube channels
- List of YouTubers
