= ESLAND Awards =

Spanish-Andorran content awards ceremony

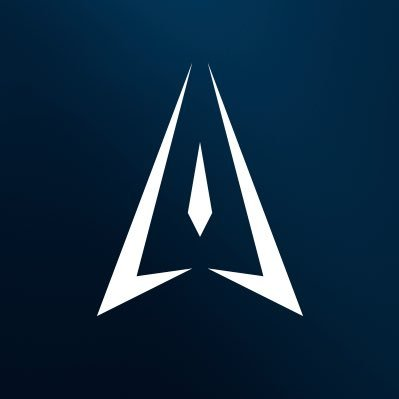
- ESLAND Award logo
- Awarded for: the creation of content from Spain, Hispanic America and Andorra
- Presented by: TheGrefg
- First award: January 17, 2022; 4 years ago
- Website: premiosesland.com

The ESLAND Awards (Spanish: Premios ESLAND) are an annual awards ceremony given to content creation from Spain, Hispanic America, and Andorra, by Spanish YouTuber and streamer David Cánovas Martínez "TheGrefg". The winners of each award are chosen by public vote and from among the top content creators in the Spanish-speaking community.

The first edition took place on January 17, 2022, at the Palau de la Música Catalana, Barcelona, and was streamed live on the streamer's Twitch channel. With more than 1 million sixty thousand viewers, it became the third most watched stream on the platform.

"ESLAND" is an acronym that refers to "España", "Latinoamérica" and "Andorra" (Spain, Latin America and Andorra).

== History ==
On December 4, 2021, TheGrefg announced the arrival of the Esland Awards through its Twitter account. There he detailed that it would take place on January 17 of the following year, from 18:00 to 23:00 (CET). The winner of each award would be chosen by a public vote, through the website, and the private votes of "150 of the most important content creators in the Spanish-speaking community".

The event was presented by TheGrefg himself, who called it "the most important project of his life". On the other hand, some media considered it "the Goya of Twitch" or "of the streamer world".

TheGrefg stated that in a second edition, the Esland would be held in Hispanic America to "have worldwide coverage". It was held on 29 January 2023 at the Auditorio Nacional in Mexico City.

== Categories ==
=== 2022 Esland Awards ===
==== Streamer of the year ====
Winner	Nominees
Ibai	AuronPlay; Rubius; JuanSGuarnizo

==== Best content series ====
Winner	Nominees
Tortillaland ( AuronPlay)	Marbella Vice ( Ibai); Egoland ( Alexby11); Arkadia ( Willyrex, Vegetta777, Nexxuz, Nefarius)

==== Revelation streamer ====
Winner	Nominees
ElXokas	Biyín; IlloJuan; El Mariana

==== Best event of the year ====
Winner	Nominees
La Velada ( Ibai)	Campanadas 2021 ( Ibai); Mundial de Globos ( Ibai); Padel Argentino Markitonavaja ( KRÜ Destination AGS 2)

==== Best track record ====
Winner	Nominees
Fernanfloo	Knekro; Outconsumer; Alexelcapo

==== Best talk show of the year ====
Winner	Nominees
The Wild Project ( Jordi Wild)	Esportmaniacos ( Yuste); YoInterneto ( DarioEmeHache, Orslok, Cheeto); El chiringuito ( Atresmedia)

==== Best song of the year ====
Winner	Nominees
"El cuarteto de Ibai" ( Ibai, Lucas Requena, OrtoPilot)	"Tofu Delivery" ( Orslok, Rojuu); "Para los haters" ( Fernanfloo, Bambiel); "Por el aire" ( Robleis)

==== Jägger of the year ====
Winner	Nominees
Jägger boxeador	Andiamo; Professor Jägger; Jägger princesa

==== Best IRL streamer ====
Winner	Nominees
Kidi	Elmillor; Titus_Clan; Momo

==== Best caster of the year ====
Winner	Nominees
Kaquka	Champi; Relic; Noa

==== Best sports reporter ====
Winner	Nominees
Cristinini	Yuste; Toad Amarillo; Sookie

==== Best esports player of the year ====
Winner	Nominees
Mixwell	Th3Antonio; Elyoya; Josedeodo

==== Best roleplayer of the year ====
Winner	Nominees
AgenteMaxo	Cristinini; Reborn; Spursito

==== Best dance of the year ====
Winner	Nominees
Papi Gavi	DjMariio; Ibai; Coscu and Zzk

==== Meltdown of the year ====
Winner	Nominees
Agustin51	DjMariio; Nissaxter; ElXokas

==== Fail of the year ====
Winner	Nominees
Ibai (Premios 40)	Ampeter (caída en el Juego entre casas); ElXokas (Salgo y olvido las llaves); Pereira (puñetazo de Tole a Pereira)

==== Clip of the year ====
Winner	Nominees
Vamo' a jugar ( Sergio Agüero)	ª ( Míster Jägger); Esto no es un juego ( ElXokas); Lo reconozco, soy Ampeter ( Ibai)

=== 2023 Esland Awards ===
Streamer of the Year (Note: Ibai Llanos 38,52% (21% comunidad + 56,03% jurado); IlloJuan 22,34% (22% comunidad + 22,67% jurado))	Revelation streamer (Note: Spreen 39,7% (29% comunidad + 50,40% jurado); Rivers 35,11% (35% comunidad + 35,22% jurado))
Entregado por: TheGrefg: (Spain) Ibai Llanos; (Spain) IlloJuan; (Spain) AuronPlay; (Mexico) El Mariana; (Mexico) El Ded; (Spain) El Rubius; (Colombia) JuanSGuarnizo; (Mexico) Quackity; (Mexico) Rios; (Argentina) Spreen	Entregado por: IlloJuan: (Argentina) Spreen; (Mexico) Rios; (Spain) Noni; (Mexico) Quackity; (Mexico) Aldo Geo; (Spain) Carola; (Argentina) Carreraaa; (Mexico) Conterstine; (Peru) El Zeein; (Colombia) WestCOL
Evento of the Year (Note: La Velada del año II 95,61% (92% comunidad + 98,21% jurado); El Partidazo de Youtubers 2 2,40% (3,6% comunidad + 1,79% jurado))	Fail of the Year (Note: Manute 33,14% (27% comunidad + 39,28% jurado); Madre de Karchez 20,54% (25% comunidad + 16,08% jurado))
Entregado por: Alecmolón: La Velada del Año II ( (Spain) Ibai Llanos); El Partidazo de Youtubers 2 ( (Spain) DjMariio); GP Twitter ( (Spain) HalesF1); Juaniquilacopa Beer Pong ( (Colombia) JuanSGuarnizo); Balloon World Cup 2022 ( (Spain) Ibai Llanos y (Spain) Gerard Piqué); Blitzpooky ( (Mexico) Ama Blitz); Disaster Chefs ( (Spain) Ibai Llanos); Gran Premio de Twittch ( (Spain) Ibai Llanos); Las Campanadas de Ibai 2022 ( (Spain) Ibai Llanos); Stream World Championship ( (Spain) TheGrefg)	Entregado por: Trobador de Ringcraft —Iago Littlefoot—: Ahí va mi burst ( (Spain) Manute); La caída ( (Spain) madre de Karchez); El reloj irrompible ( (Spain) Ibai Llanos y (Spain) Masi); El salto ( (Colombia) JuanSGuarnizo); Aspirando a un bicho ( (Spain) El Rubius); El fallo de la cam ( (Spain) Carola); Inglés en Ringcraft ( (Spain) Abby y (Peru) El Zeein); La muerte de Ampeter ( (Spain) Ibai Llanos); Ringcraft ( (Spain) TheGrefg); Toc, toc ( (Argentina) Farfadox)
Clip of the Year (Note: Gerard Romero 61,44% (39% comunidad + 83,88% jurado); Quackity 19,03% (30% comunidad + 8,06% jurado))	Anger of the Year (Note: Luzu 54,72% (49% comunidad + 60,43% jurado); DjMaRiiO 24,84% (22% comunidad + 27,68% jurado))
Entregado por: RickyExp: La haka ( (Spain) Gerard Romero); Sonríe si te gusta el pito ( (Mexico) Quackity); Ataque a la bandera de Francia ( (Spain) El Rubius); Si aparece ahora, nos gusta el pene ( (Argentina) Spreen, (Argentina) Farfadox, (Mexico) Conterstine, (France) Shadoune666, (Spain) Serpias); Cantando en Squid Craft Games ( (Mexico) ZilverK); Face Reveal ( (Spain) Axozer); Flashazo ( (Mexico) Rivers); No ( (Costa Rica) Ale Cuatro); Ringcraft ( (Spain) AuronPlay); Teleturbios ( (Spain) Carola)	Entregado por: Agustin51: (Spain) Luzu; (Spain) DjMariio; (Spain) Ibai Llanos y (Argentina) Spreen; (Mexico) Quackity; (Spain) Carola; (Spain) Fargan; (Spain) Mayichi; (Spain) Nissaxter; (Mexico) Pipepunk; (Spain) Zeling
Dance of the Year (Note: Carreraaa 44,1% (34% comunidad + 54,21% jurado); Follacamiones24 22,83% (18% comunidad + 27,65% jurado))	Roleplayer of the Year (Note: JuansGuarnizo 42,47% (45% comunidad + 39,93% jurado); AgenteMaxo 27,60% (26% comunidad + 29,51% jurado))
Entregado por: Spursito: (Argentina) Carreraaa; (Spain) Follacamiones24; (Spain) AuronPlay; (Mexico) El Mariana; (Spain) El Rubius; (Peru) Locochón; (Andorra) Spursito; (Cuba) Staryuuki; (United States) GamsterGaming; (Spain) Reborn	Entregado por: Spoksponha: (Colombia) JuanSGuarnizo; (Spain) AgenteMaxo; (Spain) Carola; (Spain) Reborn; (Spain) Cristinini; (Spain) DessT3; (Spain) Luzu; (Spain) Perxitaa; (Mexico) Quackity; (Spain) Tanizen
Esports Player of the Year (Note: Jelty 28,11% (34% comunidad + 22,22% jurado); Mixwell 25,78% (21% comunidad + 30,55% jurado))	Best sports reporter (Note: Gerard Romero 46,10% (52% comunidad + 40,2% jurado); Tamayovision 19,75% (15% comunidad + 24,55% jurado))
Entregado por: Mellado, Suja y Ulises: (Argentina) K1NG; (Spain) Mixwell; (Spain) Flakked; (Spain) Reven; (Spain) Elyoya; (Argentina) Josedeodo; (Chile) Keznit; (Spain) Koldo; (Chile) Mazino; (Chile) Tacolilla	Entregado por: Juanpa Zurita: (Spain) Gerard Romero; (Spain) Tamayovision; (Spain) Cell; (Spain) Yuste; (Spain) Anujbost; (Spain) Memorias de Pez; (Spain) Noticias Ilustradas; (Spain) Rubén Martín; (Mexico) Tartaja; (Spain) TioShur
Caster of the Year (Note: Vicky Palami 33,67% (44% comunidad + 23,33% jurado); Suja 26,51% (25% comunidad + 28,03% jurado))	IRL Streamer IRL of the Year (Note: Kidi 33,74% (21% comunidad + 46,47% jurado); Viviendoenlacalle 26,82% (26% comunidad + 27,64% jurado))
Entregado por: Ibai Llanos: (Mexico) Vicky Palami; (Spain) Suja; (Spain) Mellado; (Spain) Ulises; (Spain) Champi; (Spain) Cristinini; (Spain) KNekro; (Spain) Sergio Ferra; (Spain) Skain; (Spain) Wolk	Entregado por: Grenheir: (Spain) Kidi; (Spain) Viviendoenlacalle; (Spain) ArrozyDesgracias; (Spain) LlunaClark; (Spain) Alex Boken; (Argentina) Brunenger; (Spain) Cyngus TV; (Spain) Grenheir; (Mexico) LoncheDeHuevito; (Spain) Vik_nomore
Song of the Year (Note: Solo – Robleis 32,14% (34% comunidad + 30,28% jurado); La trampa es ley – Lit Killah 30,02% (29% comunidad + 31,04% jurado))	Vtuber of the Year (Note: ZilverK 57,02% (62% comunidad + 52,40% jurado); Nimu Spacecat 36,45% (29% comunidad + 43, 90% jurado))
Entregado por: Líder de Caballeros de México —Grupo Mariachi—: «Solo» ( (Argentina) Robleis); «La Trampa es ley» ( (Argentina) Lit Killah); «Ojos llorosos» ( (Spain) Magus); «Otra vez» ( (Costa Rica) Rodezel, (Uruguay) Barca, (Mexico) JCBG, (Mexico) Hasvik); «A fuego» ( (Argentina) Robleis); «Acensor» ( (Argentina) Robleis); «Gema rosa» ( (Spain) Orslok); «Gourmet» ( (Spain) RickyEdit); «Warzone 2.0» ( (Spain) Sinapsis, (Spain) Kronno); «Ya no vuelvas» ( (Argentina) Luck Ra)	Entregado por: TheGrefg VTuber y The Pingüiners —Biris & Boris—: (Mexico) ZilverK; (Argentina) Nimu Spacecat; (Colombia) Emikukis; (Mexico) KendoMurft; (Japan) Hana Yomeguri; (Japan) Hina Misora; (Chile) Karma; (Chile) Lunaria; (Peru) Rakkun; (Spain) Serpias
Best miniseries (Note: Squid Craft Games 89,15% (82% comunidad + 96,30% jurado); Saw Minecraft Games 5,50% (11% comunidad + 0% jurado))	Best content series (Note: ElDedsafío 2 34,25% (28% comunidad + 40,50% jurado); Tortillaland 2 25,50% (30% comunidad + 21% jurado))
Entregado por: Míster Jägger y una espectadora al azar: Squid Craft Games ( (El Salvador) Komanche, (Spain) AuronPlay, (Spain) El Rubius); Saw Minecraft Games ( (Spain) AuronPlay); El suelo es lava ( (Mexico) Rivers); Juaniquilacopa Build Battle ( (Colombia) JuanSGuarnizo); HormiGeo ( (Mexico) Aldo Geo); PermadeaZ ( (Spain) Silithur); Rascaland ( (Peru) El Zeein); Reddit Pixel War; Streamerland ( (Spain) Agustabell212); Torneo Modern Warfare 3 ( (Spain) IlloJuan)	Entregado por: Polispol: El Dedsafío 2 ( (Costa Rica) Ale Cuatro); Tortillaland 2 ( (Spain) AuronPlay); Karmaland V ( (Spain) Willyrex, (Spain) Vegetta777); Pokémon Twitch Cup 2 ( (Spain) Sekiam, (Spain) ErnesBarbeQ); Arkadia 2 ( (Spain) Vegetta777 y (Spain) NexxuzHD); Egoland 2 ( (Spain) AlexBy11); London Eye ( (Spain) CooLifeGame, (Spain) AuronPlay); Mundial F1 online ( (Spain) Ampeter); Mundo león 3 ( (Spain) León Picarón); Mundo Pixelmón 3 ( (Spain) Folagor, (Spain) FrigoAdri)
Talk show del año (Note: The Wild Project 63,50% (52% comunidad + 75% jurado); Charlando Tranquilamente 18% (21% comunidad + 15% jurado))
Entregado por: Rapder y Skiper: The Wild Project ( (Spain) Jordi Wild); Charlando tranquilamente ( (Spain) Ibai Llanos); La mesa reñoña ( (Mexico) Franco Escamilla); YoInterneto ( (Spain) DarioEmeHache, (Spain) Orslok, (Spain) Cheeto); Los amos del universo ( (Mexico) Iván «la Mole» Fernatt y (Mexico) Franco Escamilla); Club 113 ( (Spain) Goorgo, (Spain) Nil Ojeda y (Spain) Werlyb); La peor generación ( (Spain) Soy Matt, (Spain) Darkraimola, (Spain) Zroly Sensei, (Spain) Rodik Sama y (Spain) Beelce); Territorio revival ( (Spain) Fer Delgado, (Spain) Ángel Colomé y (Spain) Miguel Delgado); Un día con Nimu ( (Argentina) Nimu Spacecat); Y tal ( (Spain) RickyEdit)

== Controversy ==
On January 19, 2022, a clip went viral from streamer Folagor, who showed his disagreement with the nominees in the "roleplayer of the year" category, calling them "fucking bullshit". The controversy trended on Twitter with another clip, where he said that streamer Biyin, who was nominated as a "revelation streamer," became famous "for being AuronPlay's girlfriend," so he didn't understand the reason for her nomination. After other streamers spoke out on the issue, in a broadcast, Folagor apologized for his expressions, explained that Biyin's clip was "taken out of context" and, still maintaining his opinion, stressed that "it should have been other people who should have been nominated".

In October 2022, due to the announcement of the second edition which would take place on Mexico City, a controversy came up, in which Spaniard streamers Rubius and AuronPlay, among other streamers said that "they weren't going to Mexico because it would be too far". These comments weren't well received by their Mexican followers, which led to a decrease on these streamers' followers counters.

On the second edition, a nomination to the user "Follacamiones24" (which could be translated as Trucksmasher24) on the dance of the year category went viral due to its irrelevance on Twitch platform, as he was an X social media user. Different influencers showed their opinion, being the most influential the opinion stated by the streamer TheGrefg, who said that the X user previously mentioned was not going to be supported by the community. These words carried with themselves different reviews about its user's fair participation on these awards edition.
