= Fernanfloo =

Salvadoran gaming YouTuber (born 1993)

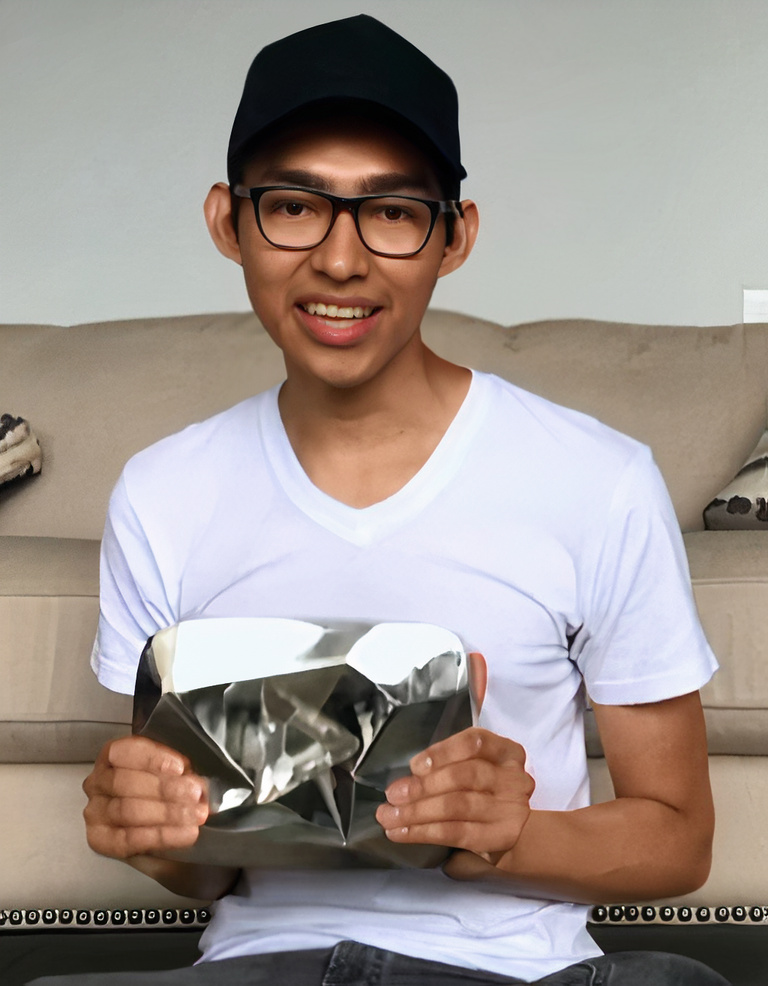
- Fernanfloo in 2022
- Born: Luis Fernando Flores Alvarado; 7 July 1993 (age 33); San Salvador, El Salvador
- Occupations: YouTuber; Online streamer; programmer
- Spouse: Mar Sofía Escobar Hernández (m. 2025)

Twitch information
- Channel: Fernanfloo
- Followers: 3.5 million

YouTube information
- Channel: Fernanfloo
- Years active: 2011–present
- Genres: Let's Play; Comedy; Vlog; Animation
- Subscribers: 50.4 million
- Views: 11 billion
- Last updated: 30 May 2026

Luis Fernando Flores Alvarado (born July 7, 1993), better known as Fernanfloo, is a Salvadoran gaming and comedy YouTuber. He has uploaded more than 571 videos, with over 10 billion total views. His channel has 50 million subscribers. As of June 2025, his channel is the 87th-most-subscribed channel on YouTube, and the fifth most-subscribed Spanish-speaking channel behind El Reino Infantil, Mikecrack, JuegaGerman and Juan de Dios Pantoja. It is currently the second-most subscribed channel in El Salvador and Central America, behind only Alfredo Larin, another Salvadoran YouTuber.

== Career ==
On May 2, 2011, he created his YouTube channel "Fernanfloo", whose name is a combination of his names Fernando Flores. At just 18 years of age, Fernanfloo began his YouTube career uploading video tutorials as well as short clips of action scenes with special effects. His first video was "Nightmare – Short Action Scene". Later on, he switched his content to gameplays of video games such as Call of Duty, God of War III and Mortal Kombat, gaining notoriety in the Spanish-speaking YouTube scene.

In 2016, Fernanfloo in partnership with BBTV launched an app titled The Fernanfloo Game, which received 2.3 million downloads within its first week of release, and it was positioned as number 1 in 17 countries within 24 hours. In 2016 he was nominated for the MTV Millennial Awards, in the category of "Digital Icon of the Year". In 2017 he was again nominated for the MTV Millennial Awards, in the "Miaw icon of the Year" and "Celebrity Challenge" categories.

In 2017, Fernanfloo participated in the Ecuadorian film Dedicada a mi Ex, briefly playing as a waiter. This film was released on 8 November 2019 in Ecuador and later was available on Netflix. In August 2017, he announced the publication of his first book, a graphic novel titled Curly está en peligro.

After a four-month hiatus, he uploaded a video entitled "Se Acabó" ("It's Over"), in which he stated that: "Things are really going to change. You will not see many videos as there have been during these seven years that you they have accompanied me throughout this journey". Fernanfloo opted to create a Twitch channel to stream games, primarily Fortnite. In May of the same year, he created another YouTube channel called "Fernan", which contains clips from his Twitch streams.

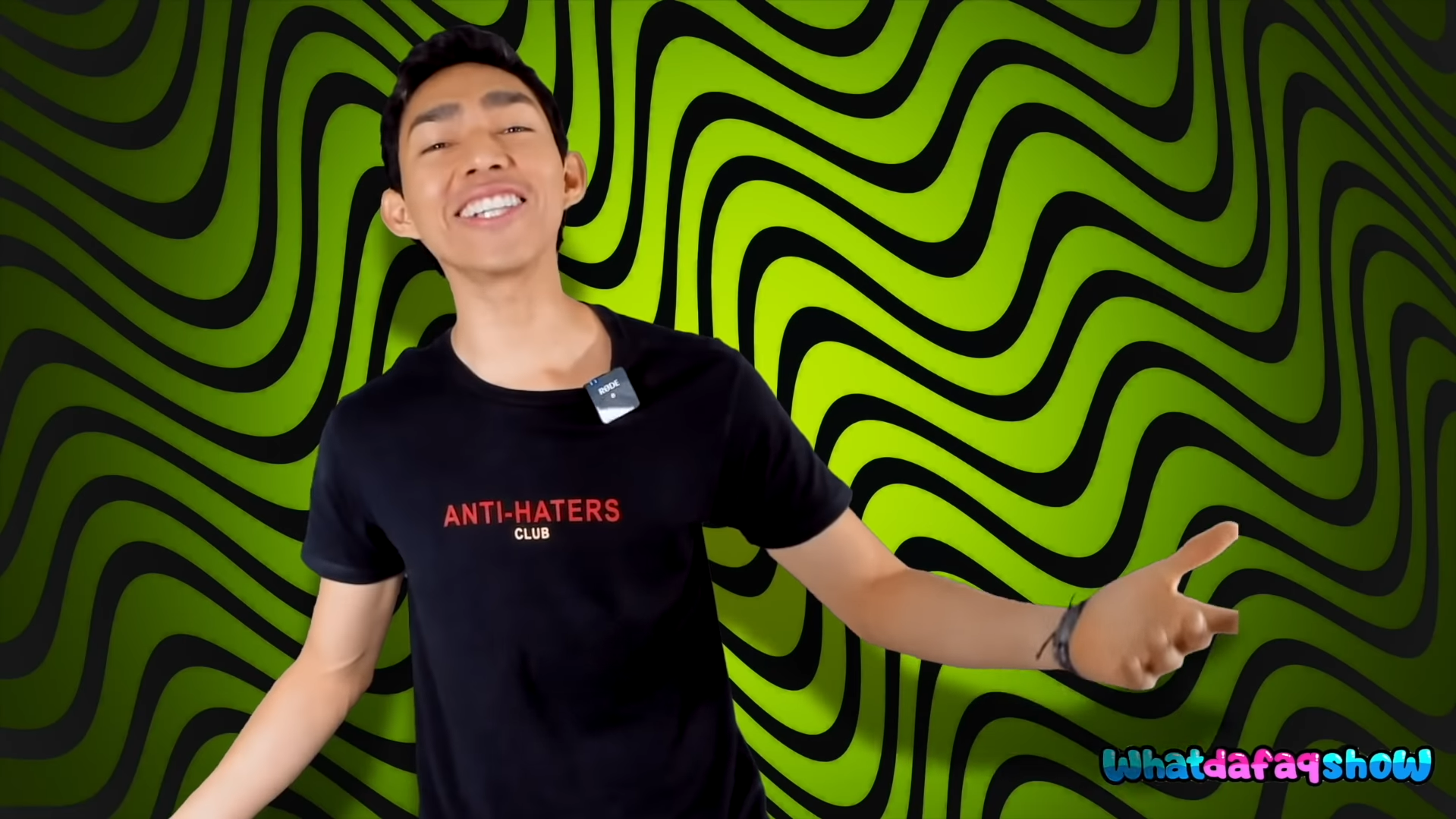
Fernanfloo hosting Whatdafaqshow in January 2022

In January 2019, he announced his collaboration with game developer Capcom to have himself on the Resident Evil 2 remake, in a video titled "Soy un Zombie" (I'm a Zombie), Fernan relates that he went to Japan to have makeup done and his movements captured to be one of the many zombies in the game, later in that same video a trailer appears promoting the 1-Shot Demo. In 2020 the developer BBTV announced the release of Fernanfloo Party, game that was available at the end of the same year on iOS and Android.

On September 16, 2021, the YouTuber Bambiel, known for his song titled "El Rap de Fernanfloo" ("Fernanfloo Rap"), he collaborated with Fernanfloo for a rap song entirely dedicated to the haters. The music video accumulated more than 4 million visits and became number 2 in trends, later on 24 September 2021, accumulated 10 million visits. In January 2022, he appeared in a collaboration as host of Peruvian YouTuber Mox's "Whatdafaqshow" channel.

== Personal life ==
Luis Fernando Flores Alvarado was born on July 7, 1993 in San Salvador, El Salvador. Fernanfloo has identified himself as agnostic.

On April 12, 2025, Fernanfloo held his civil wedding with influencer Mar Sofia, who was already his girlfriend at the time. On May 11, Fernanfloo confirmed the death of his pet Curly, an iconic dog among his followers who appeared in his old videos. On June 19, Fernanfloo announced that he would become a father, after his girlfriend became pregnant with their first child.

== Awards and nominations ==
Year	Award	Category	Nominee	Result	Ref.
2015	MTV Millennial Awards	Master Gamer	Himself	Nominated	
2016	MTV Millennial Awards	Digital Icon of the Year	Himself	Nominated	
2016	MTV Millennial Awards	Master Gamer	Himself	Nominated	
2017	MTV Millennial Awards	MIAW Icon of the Year	Himself	Nominated	
2017	MTV Millennial Awards	Celebrity Challenge	Himself	Nominated	
2019	MTV Millennial Awards	Streamer of the Year	Himself	Nominated	
2018	Nickelodeon Mexico Kids' Choice Awards	Favorite Gamer	Himself	Nominated	
2018	Fans Choice Awards	Editorial	Himself	Won	
2018	Fans Choice Awards	Influencers	Himself	Nominated	
2021	Nickelodeon Mexico Kids' Choice Awards	Gamer MVP	Himself	Nominated	
2021	ESLAND Awards	Song of the Year	"Para los haters" (with Bambiel)	Nominated	
2021	ESLAND Awards	Best Trajectory	Himself	Won	
2022	Nickelodeon Mexico Kids' Choice Awards	Coolest Gamer	Himself	Pending	

== See also ==
- List of YouTubers
- List of most-subscribed YouTube channels
