= IlloJuan =

Spanish YouTuber and Twitch streamer

- IlloJuan in 2017
- Born: Juan Alberto García Gámez; June 22, 1994 (age 32); Fuengirola, Málaga, Spain
- Partner(s): Masi Rodríguez (2017–2024); Lola Índigo (2025–present)

Twitch information
- Channel: IlloJuan
- Years active: 2015–present
- Genres: Comedy and gaming
- Followers: 4.7 million

Juan Alberto García Gámez (born 22 June 1994), known as IlloJuan or LMDShow, is a Spanish Twitch streamer and YouTuber.

== Biography ==
Illojuan was born on 22 June 1994 in Fuengirola, Málaga. He studied Law and specialized in criminal law, working at Alhaurín de la Torre prison, but he decided to focus on the content creation.

== Career ==
He started in YouTube using the alias of LMDShow, and he made summaries of gameplays from YouTubers like Alexelcapo, so he gained popularity. Then he made humorist videos with his friends, so he got more followers.

In 2016 he started in Twitch, where he became one of the most followed streamers in Spain, and in January 2021 he reached the 10,000 subscribers. In this platform, he played Bloodborne, Rust, Cyberpunk 2077 and Red Dead Redemption, between others.

In 2018 he moved to Madrid and worked for PlayStation. He was a collaborator with Ibai Llanos, Mangelrogel, Spursito and DJMaRiiO. He participated on Ibailand, a project made by Ibai to discover new talented people on Twitch, where he was with Ander Cortés, Ivana Vega, Reven, BarbeQ, Knekro, Cristinini and Werlyb, so he gained more followers and recognition. He became top 10 as Spanish Twitch streamer with more subscriptions, overcoming AuronPlay, and in July 2022 he got one million of followers on YouTube, where he used to upload the summary of his live streamings.

On 23 October 2023 it was released Mi historia, a documentary film by Domino's Originals about his life. In 2024 he did several projects such as a game show creating songs with Suno AI which he called "Operación Temazo", and a Q&A game show called "El Concursillo", in which TheGrefg, Jordi Wild, Sekiam, Xokas, Ibai and Spreen, between others, were the contestants.

He released the album Hotel Maligno in 2024 with the collaboration of Spanish rappers SpokSponha, Kase.O and Foyone, and produced by Sceno. It is inspired by roleplay characters in Marbella Vice from GTA V, and it mixes rap, dembow and dancehall with a parody point. Jordi Wild also participated on it.Later, on June, 2026 the second album, Mesón Masón, was released.

== Personal life ==
Since 2017 he was in a relationship with María Isabel Rodríguez, known as Masi, a television host, singer, actress and former content creator. In 2022 they rented a house in Madrid. They separated in 2024.

Since 2025, he has been in a relationship with singer Lola Índigo.

He holds a company named ILLOPASS S.L.

== Awards ==
In 2024 he won the ESLAND for Best Variety Streamer and Best Streamer. He also won the Premio Ídolo in the Streamer Category in the same year. He was nominated to Content Creator of the Year in the 11th edition of The Game Awards.
