= Mikecrack =

Spanish YouTuber (born 1993)

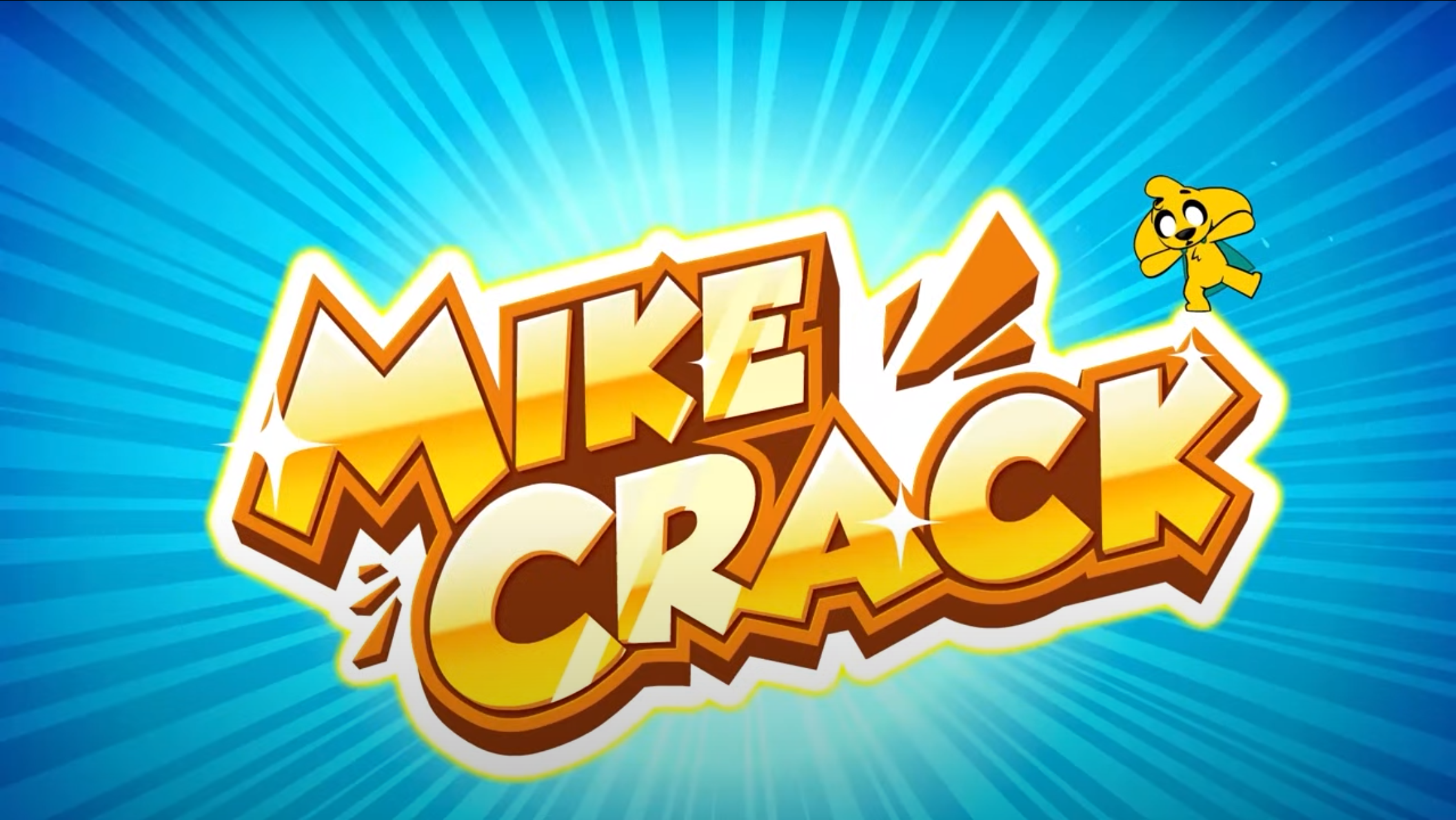
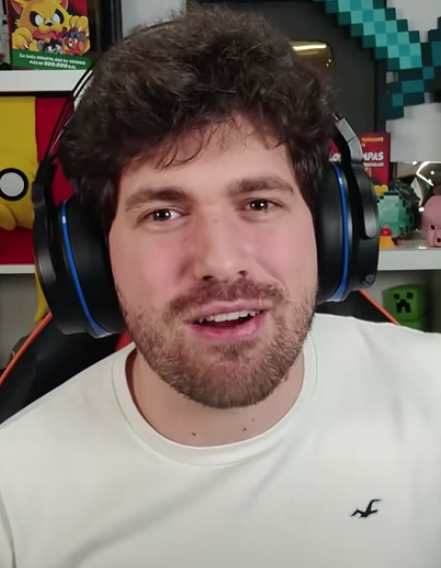
- Opening title to a 2021 Mikecrack video Mikecrack in 2021
- Born: Miguel Bernal Montes; March 27, 1993 (age 33); Madrid, Spain
- Occupation: YouTuber

YouTube information
- Channel: Mikecrack
- Years active: 2009–present
- Genres: Let's Plays; musical parodies
- Subscribers: 58.6 million
- Views: 22.07 billion
- Last updated: September 6, 2026
- Website: www.mikecrack.com

Miguel Bernal Montes (born March 27, 1993), better known online as Mikecrack, is a Spanish YouTuber, computer animator and singer known for his let's plays of video games, as well as his animations and musical parodies.

== Biography and career ==
Having studied four years at Juan Tamariz's magician school, Bernal started a YouTube channel in 2009, where he would upload magic tricks. He later left that channel to study Biotechnology in university, where he graduated in 2015. While studying for a master's degree in February 2016, he uploaded his first video to a new YouTube channel focused on gaming content.

Bernal's channel mainly focuses on videos related to the video game Minecraft; he also uploads music parodies and animated videos. A prominent aspect of his videos is his on-screen persona named Mike, an animated dog character similar in likeness to Adventure Time's Jake the Dog.

Bernal created a team called Los #CoMPas with Spanish YouTubers ElTrollino, Timba Vk and Sparta356. The team frequently recorded videos together.

In 2020, Forbes Spain named Bernal in their list of the top 100 influencers in Spain for the year.

In 2021, he passed 30 million subscribers to become the third most popular channel in Spain by subscribers. He also created an original animated series named "Las Perrerías de Mike". On 30 July 2023, he became the most subscribed Spanish youtuber, surpassing Rubius.

== Awards ==
Year	Ceremony	Category	Result	Ref.
2020	Streamy Awards	International	Nominated	
2021	Streamy Awards	International	Nominated	

== See also ==
- List of most-subscribed YouTube channels
