= Elxokas =

Spanish influencer, content creator, and Twitch streamer

El Xokas
- Born: Joaquín Domínguez Portela; 13 April 1991 (age 35); Abadín, Lugo, Spain
- Occupation: Twitch streamer

Instagram information
- Page: El Xokas
- Followers: 1.3 million (8 June 2025)

TikTok information
- Page: El Xokas
- Followers: 5.8 million (8 June 2025)

Twitch information
- Channel: Elxokas
- Years active: 2018–present
- Genre: Gaming
- Games: World of Warcraft; Rust; Minecraft
- Followers: 4.26 million (8 June 2025)

YouTube information
- Channel: El Xokas
- Subscribers: 2.74 million (8 June 2025)
- Views: 457 million (8 June 2025)

Joaquín Domínguez Portela (born 13 April 1991), known as El Xokas, is a Spanish influencer, content creator, and Twitch streamer. He gained popularity on Twitch and YouTube. In 2022 he was the most subscribed channel on Twitch in Spain.

As of 2025 he has 2.74 million followers on YouTube, and 4,264,928 on Twitch.

== Biography ==
Xokas was born on 13 April 1991 in Lugo. His father is from A Coruña and his mother from Abadín in the province of Lugo. They own a hair salon. He studied primary school on Colegio Rosalía de Castro and then he studied ESO in Fingoi. He moved to Salamanca to study an Advertising and Marketing Bachelor Degree at Universidad Pontificia de Salamanca, and then he studied a postgrad course in audiovisual post-production in Madrid.

He is dating League of Legends streamer Zeling.

== Career ==
In 2016 he started as post-producer and video editor for Real Madrid Club de Fútbol, and at the same time he was a YouTuber, where he uploaded League of Legends videos. On 8 January 2018 he started his career on Twitch, making streams with content related with World of Warcraft, becoming in 2019 in the main content creator for this category and one of the prominent streamers in Europe.

On 27 August 2019 he ended his contract as post-productor, working on full-time on Twitch. He attended Twitch events alongside El Rubius. and he also collaborated with Ibai Llanos. On 9 January 2021 he was invited to Juego del calamar, one of the major events between streamers and YouTubers, where he became one of the most influential one. He also was invited to a Rust event. Then he attended television programms such as La Resistencia, on Movistar Plus, and The Wild Project and Charlando Tranquilamente podcasts.

In 2021 he ran EL XOKAST podcast, where he interviewed urban music singers such as Natos y Waor, Prok and SFDK. He won an ESLAND Awards for Revelation Streamer of the Year. In the same year he was implicated in a controversy by Ministry of Equality, Irene Montero.

At the beginning of 2022 he reached 1.2 million viewers during the streaming of Squid Game, Minecraft event which was the third streaming video most watched on the platform, and it is based on the Netflix series.

In February 2024 he acquired Knoweats, a business which sells prepared food, to compete against Wetaca. In February 2025 he created the WoW event named Go Again, made for Spanish players, which starts on 9 February.
