= Coscu =

Argentine Twitch streamer (born 1991)

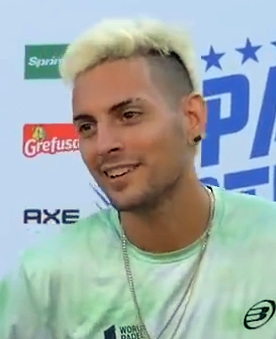
- Martín in 2021
- Born: Martín Pérez Disalvo; 3 August 1991 (age 35); La Plata, Buenos Aires, Argentina
- Occupation: Twitch streamer

Twitch information
- Channel: Coscu
- Years active: 2012–present
- Genre: Gaming
- Followers: 3.7 million

YouTube information
- Channel: Coscu
- Years active: 2013–present
- Subscribers: 4.69 million
- Views: 1.20 billion
- Last updated: 2 May 2023

Martín Pérez Disalvo (born 3 August 1991), better known as Coscu, is an Argentine Twitch streamer, gamer, internet celebrity and singer.

He is the founder and leader of the Coscu Army, a Spanish-speaking community of esports players and streamers from Argentina. He is also the creator and presenter of the Coscu Army Awards, which is responsible for awarding the most outstanding Twitch users in Argentina during the year and which in 2020 was the most watched broadcast in Latin America and among the ten most watched in the platform's history. Also, in 2021, it premiered the Coscu Army Got Talent event, which is based on awarding the best talent in the contest.

As of May 2023, he has more than 3.7 million followers on Twitch; on YouTube, he has more than 4.6 million subscribers and more than 1.2 billion views.

== Biography ==
Martín Pérez Disalvo was born on 3 August 1991 in La Plata, Argentina, the son of Néstor Benigno Pérez and Norma Susana Disalvo, both hospital doctors.

After attending elementary and high school at the Escuela Normal Nacional No 1 "Mary O. Graham", he studied Computer science at the University of La Plata, while working as a graduate trip coordinator and as a summer PR. During this time, he learned that his father had Alzheimer's, so he dabbled in the competitive video game League of Legends as a means of distraction. In between his playing years, he went on to compete for the professional team, Caribbean Union Gaming of Central America, but was unable to continue due to his parents' divorce and constant family problems. He also had a short career as bassist and vocalist of the indie-pop band Looking Up until his departure to devote himself entirely to streaming.

== Career ==
=== 2012–2015: Beginnings ===
During his professional career in League of Legends, he met another player named Sm1nt, who was doing live streams for Twitch of his games in the game. Pérez Disalvo participated in several transmissions, playing alongside him until Sm1nt encouraged him to start transmitting as well.

On 26 September 2012, Martin created his Twitch channel under the name Shacoscu (a combination of the name of his dog, the symbol of his channel, and a League of Legends character). For four years, he stood out as one of the most important video game streamers in Argentina.

=== Since 2016: Change in content and popularity ===
Around 2016 he changed his content based entirely on League of Legends games for IRL, a category on Twitch where the transmitter tells anecdotes and sequences of his life in an ordinary way, in addition to chatting together with his followers. On his channel, he collaborated with emerging trap and freestyle artists such as Lit Killah, Duki, Wos, Ecko, and others, and he was also a judge on a date with Quinto Escalón. He is also credited with popularizing several neologisms that he wittily uses in his streams, which became part of the common slang of teenagers in Latin America, as explained by the Real Academia Española.

In 2018, Coscu became an official Nike ambassador in Argentina. That same year, the Coscu Army managed to become a professional esports team by competing and winning in League of Legends in the Argentine National Circuit, although in September of that year they stopped competing.

In 2019 he hosted the Buenos Aires Trap festival.

In 2020, the community returned to the professional arena with League of Legends and Counter-Strike: Global Offensive teams. In the same year, Coscu hosted the national edition of Red Bull Batalla de los Gallos Argentina with rapper Dtoke.

In 2020, Coscu enters the top ten most influential people in the country, sharing this ranking with personalities such as Alberto Fernández, Cristina Fernández de Kirchner, Mauricio Macri, Lionel Messi, and Tini Stoessel, among others.

In 2021, together with Voraz, a burger restaurant, they created the "insta burger," made from a 100% plant-based medallion, tomato, provolone, grilled egg, and citrus aioli sauce.

In the midst of the commotion over the fate of Lionel Messi's career, the footballer held a farewell dinner in Barcelona and invited Coscu, who attended the dinner along with Ibai and Sergio Agüero. Other celebrities, such as Sergio Busquets and Jordi Alba, also attended the event. Days later, at Messi's presentation at Paris Saint-Germain, the player was interviewed by Ibai, where he mentioned that the invitation to the farewell dinner was due to the fact that Coscu was leaving for Argentina the following day.

In November 2021, Coscu announced its return to competitive League of Legends, confirming the participation of Coscu Army Esports in the highest national competition, Liga Master Flow (LVP), with a team formed by Nicolás "Grafo" Graffigna, Federico "Zeko" Cristalino, and Uruguayans Santiago "Xypherz" de León and Mateo "Buggax" Aroztegui. In December, Coscu Army Espors would have their first participation in the Argentina Game Show in the Mexx Cup, where they would be crowned champion, defeating Racing Club Esports 2–0 in the semi-final and Undead BK 2–0 in the final, thus winning a prize of $250,000.

After the historic dinner with Messi, Coscu went for more, and on 13 December with Samsung, he climbed to the top of the Obelisco with his friend and colleague Geronimo "Momo" Benavides, making a historic stream being the first twitch transmission from this iconic monument of the country, where also appeared greetings from personalities such as Ibai Llanos, Sergio Agüero, Bizarrap, and Rodrigo De Paul, among others.

In January 2022, it was announced that the Coscu Army Esports roosters, who were set to compete in LVP this month, will now do so under the banner of KRÜ, an organization led by footballer Sergio Agüero.

== Coscu Army Awards ==
The Coscu Army Awards is an event that rewards and honors streamers from the Twitch community.

In 2018, he hosted the first Coscu Army Awards event at the Da Vinci School, and it was streamed on Twitch. The event reached a peak of 40 thousand viewers, surpassing the most popular streamer on the platform in the world at the time, Ninja. The streamer of the year award went to Francisco "Frankkaster" Postiglione.

In 2019, the second edition was held at the Obras Sanitarias Stadium in CABA, with a peak of almost 100 thousand spectators. On this occasion, the streamer of the year award went to Nicolás "Grafo" Graffigna.

In 2020, the third edition was organized at the Obras Sanitarias Stadium. It exceeded 425 thousand viewers and became the most watched broadcast of the platform in Latin America, and the streamers awarded Coscu the recognition of "Legend Streamer". A night full of emotions culminated with the awarding of Galo "Pimpeano" Blasco as streamer of the year.

In 2021, the fourth edition was held at the Hilton Hotel, with a peak of 367 thousand spectators. On this occasion, the streamer of the year award went to Geronimo "Momo" Benavides, and Frankkaster, Grafo and Pimpeano, champions in previous years, were also honored with a gold ring as a gift.

== Discography ==
=== Singles ===
Title	Artists	Year	Label
«Loco por ti»	Looking Up, Julián Serrano	2016	Independent artist
"Nada de nada" (Remix)	DirtyK, Coscu	2018	Independent artist
"Perdóname" (Remix)	FMK, Ale Zurita, Coscu, Bizarrap	2018	Sony Music Argentina
"Alguien de más"	Looking Up	2018	R Music
"Vuelve" (versión de Beret)	Coscu	2018	Independent artist
"My Own" (Remix)	KYOTTO, Coscu, Bizarrap	2019	Independent artist
"Calle 2" (Remix)	FMK, MYA, Coscu	2019	Sony Music Argentina
"No lo sé"	Klave, Coscu	2019	Independent artist

=== Collaborations in albums ===
- 2013: La fiesta nunca para («La Ronda»)
- 2017: Somos dos («Looking Up»)

== Videography ==
Título	Artists	Year	Label
«El rap del Demente»	Agustín de la O	2018	Independent artist
"Vuelta a la Luna" (remix)	YSY A, Duki, Neo Pistea	2018	Independent artist
«Fornai»	Duki, Orodembow	2020	DALE PLAY Records / SSJ Records
«Házmelo»	Tiago PZK	2021	Mad Move Records / Warner Music
«Como + nadie»	MYA, Lit Killah, Rusherking	2021	Sony Music Argentina
«Feel Me??»	Trueno	2021	NEUEN

== Awards and nominations ==
Year	Award	Category	Result	Ref
2018	Award Martin Fierro Digital	Best gamer content	Nominated	
2020	Coscu Army Awards	Legend Streamer	Won	
2021	MTV Millennial Awards	Streamer of the Year	Nominated	
2021	Premio Filo	Best Black Box	Won	
2022	ESLAND Awards	Dance of the Year	Nominated	
