= Franco Escamilla =

Mexican comedian

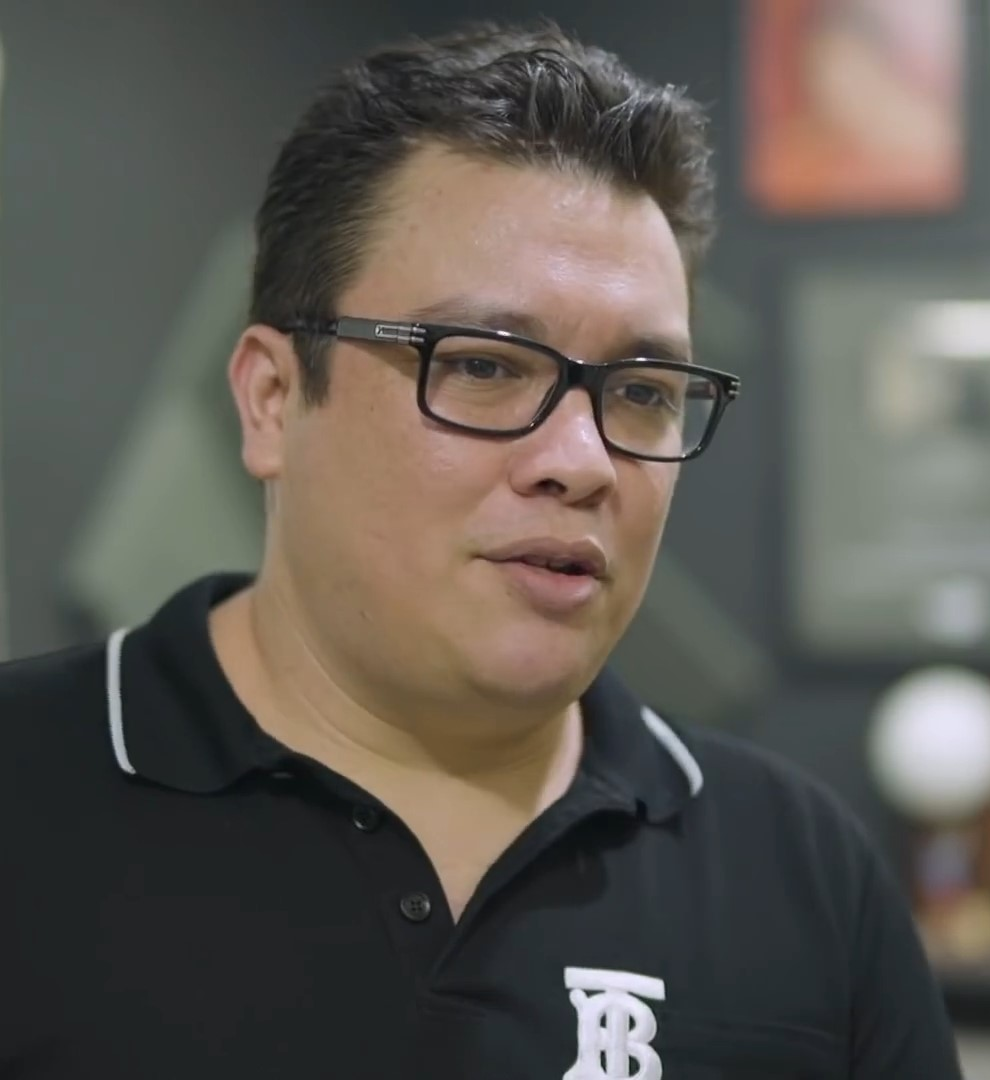
- Born: Franco Javier López Escamilla; April 29, 1981 (age 45); Cuautla, Morelos, Mexico
- Occupation: Comedian
- Known for: Founder of La Diablo Squad
- Spouse: Gabriela Salazar
- Children: 2

Franco Javier López Escamilla (born 29 April 1981) is a Mexican comedian, voice actor, musician, philanthropist, businessman, freestyler and founder of La Diablo Squad (The Devil Squad).

== Biography ==
Escamilla was born in Cuautla, Morelos on April 29 of 1981. He also has an older sister. On the summer of 1997 after his parents divorced Escamilla moved with his mom to Monterrey, Nuevo Leon. He studied music at the Escuela de Musica y Danza Superior de Monterrey.

He went to Venezuela to do his first international show in January 2016.

Escamilla studied criminology for three years but he decided to leave the career.

Before becoming a comedian, Escamilla worked as a chef at a burger place, as a waiter and at a Kentucky Fried Chicken outlet.

== Career ==
He is mainly known for his comedy shows; He has performed throughout the Mexican Republic, and throughout Latin America, even starting his own "World Tour" of his show "Por la Anécdota", having confirmed presentations in the United States of America and Europe, including trips to Japan and Australia. This tour led to sold-out nights in Los Angeles, London, Paris, Barcelona, Tokyo, and more.

His fame has made him the first comedian to appear at the National Auditorium, and in other important venues in Mexico such as the Arena Ciudad de México. In February 2020, he became the first Latin comedian to appear at Carnegie Hall in New York, in addition to making a small presentation in English at Staples Center together with Gabriel Iglesias, this catapulting him as one of the largest representatives of stand-up comedy in Mexico and Latin America.

He has five specials: "Comedians of the world", "Por la Anécdota", "Welcome to the World", "Eavesdropping", and "Ladies' Man" within the Netflix streaming platform.

He made his debut as a musician at the Trovafest in 2016. He also performed together with the Argentine band Los Caligaris at the music festival "Pa'l Norte" in 2017. He recorded his own music album in collaboration with Edgar Oceransky.

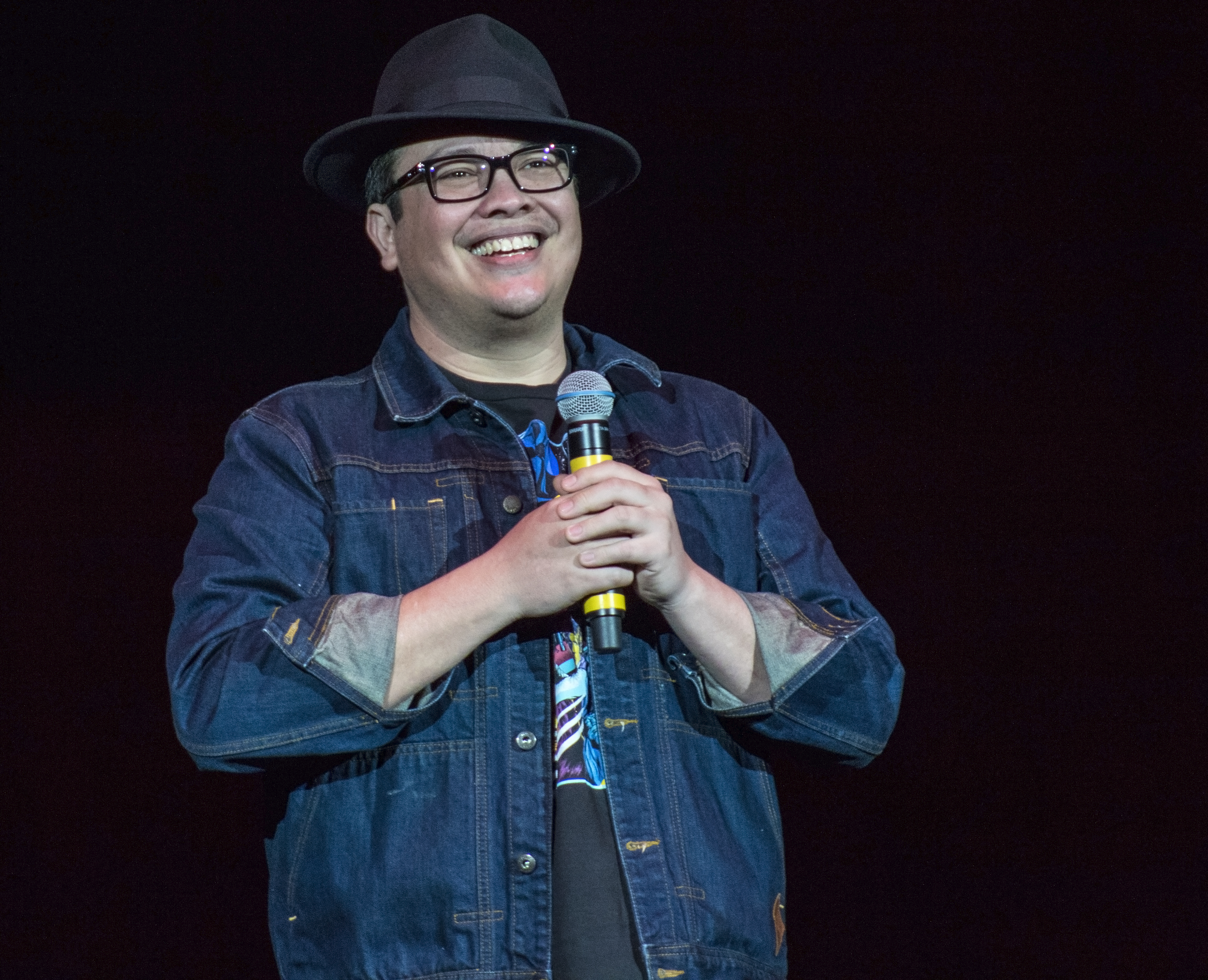
Franco Escamilla in 2019

He had his own television show on the Estrella TV channel called The Franco Escamilla Show and has also participated in episodes of Comedy Central.

He has a program called "La Mesa Reñoña", which has more than 200 editions, made by his colleagues from "La Diablo Squad", which is broadcast live every Monday at 9:30 pm. (Monterrey time) via YouTube. It has special editions with stars from various fields, including Gabriel Iglesias and John Milton.

Through its official YouTube channel, it presents a wide range of programming, among which stand out, "La mesa reñoña", "El Príncipe del barrio", "Tirando bola", "Follow me on the trip", "Desde el Cerro de la Silla with Franco Escamilla" and "Freestyle para moles" .

Escamilla performs La Mesa Reñoña and various programs with the members of his crew founded by himself called "La Diablo Squad".

In July 2018, United Talent Agency signed Escamilla in all areas of the world in order to continue to support and promote Escamilla's career when it comes to touring, film, television, brands, and more.

His "RPM" tour (2018, 2019), reached Hong Kong, Sydney, Melbourne, Israel, Dubai, Japan, Argentina, among other countries, in addition to his performances in Mexico and the United States.

He ran his "Gaby" tour, from 2022 to 2023, and is set to begin a new touring show "1995" for 2024 through 2025.

In 2023 Escamilla competed in the freestyle rap competition Freestyle Master Series (FMS) Spain, under the stage name “Lobo López”.

== Tours ==
- 2014–2015: Ríspida Rapsodia Regia (Later renamed El Show del Teatro Blanquita)
- 2015–2016: ¡Y ya! (That’s it!)
- 2016: Solo para mujeres
- 2016–2017: Bienvenido al Mundo (Welcome to the world)
- 2017: Por la anécdota (For the story)
- 2018–2019: RPM
- 2019–2021: Payaso (Clown)
- 2021–2023: Gaby
- 2024–2025: 1995
