= Movistar eSports =

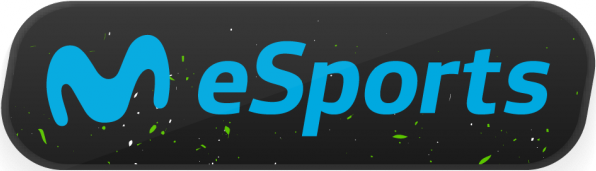
- Country: Spain

Ownership
- Owner: Movistar+

History
- Launched: 20 February 2017; 8 years ago
- Closed: 16 December 2018; 7 years ago

Links
- Website: esports.as.com

Movistar eSports is a Spanish premium channel exclusive from Movistar+ which was launched on 20 February 2017, being the first one to broadcast electronic sports. The website was opened on 15 June 2017, and from 24 April 2017 it broadcast 24 hours content for seven days per week.

In February 2018 it got integrated into Diario AS, showing esports news. It ended on 16 December 2018 and it moved to social media on Twitter, Instagram or Facebook, and shows amateur and professional competitions on YouTube and Twitch, creating also the club Movistar Riders.
