= Vegetta777 =

Spanish YouTuber (born 1989)

- Born: Samuel de Luque Batuecas; April 12, 1989 (age 37); Madrid, Spain
- Occupation: YouTuber

YouTube information
- Channel: VEGETTA777
- Years active: 2008–present
- Genre: Let's Play
- Subscribers: 34.6 million
- Views: 16.3 billion
- Last updated: 14 October 2024

Samuel de Luque Batuecas (born 12 April 1989), known online as Vegetta777, is a Spanish gaming YouTuber known for his videos about different games and variety of content. His YouTube channel is the 2nd most-subscribed channel from Spain. He currently lives in Andorra.

== Biography ==
Samuel de Luque Batuecas was born on 12 April 1989 in Madrid, but moved to Alcorcón when he was little. He studied nursing in the city of Madrid, Spain a course from which he graduated.

In August 2013 he founded his company Luque Social Gamer SL, his mother Ines Batuecas is the sole administrator of the company since May 2016. Since 2015 together with his colleague Willyrex he has published several books in the "Wigetta" series.
