= Knekro =

Spanish streamer and YouTuber

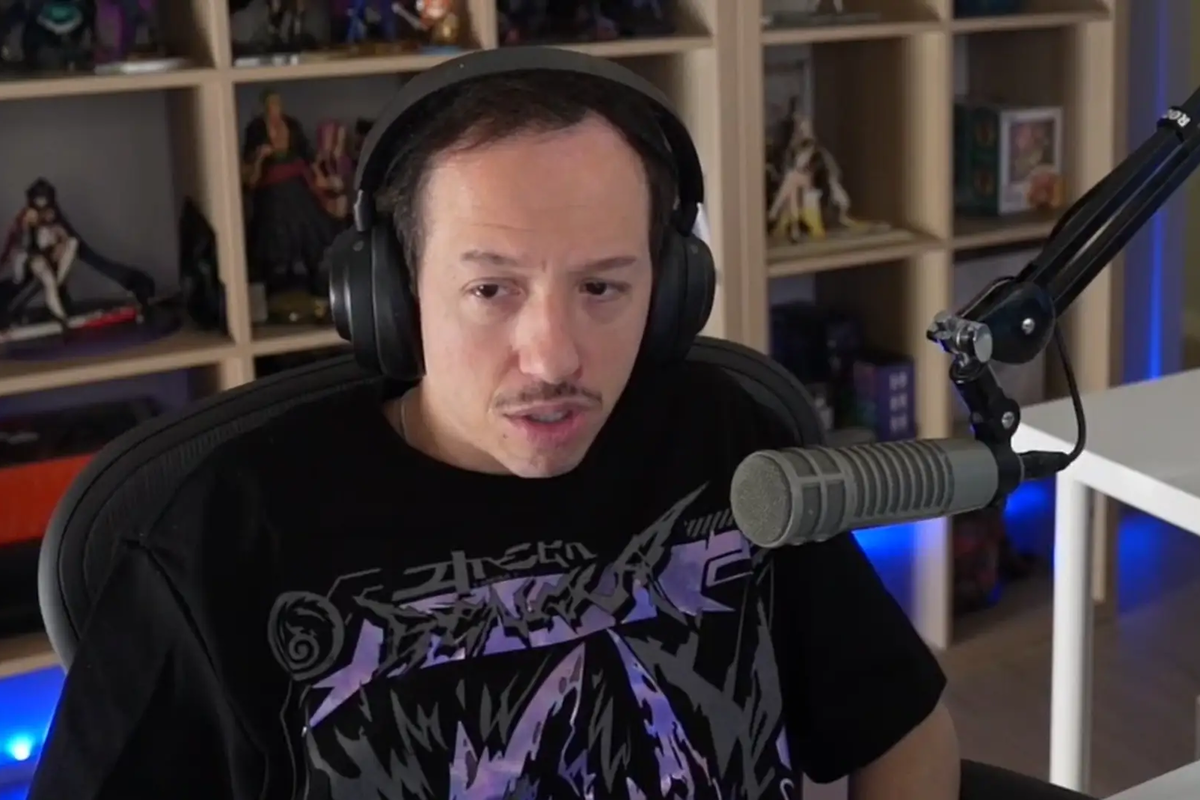
- Knekro in 2026
- Born: Sergio García Maroto; May 23, 1984 (age 42); Madrid, Spain
- Occupations: Twitch streamer; esports broadcaster; YouTuber
- Organization: Movistar KOI (2021–present)

Twitch information
- Channel: knekro
- Years active: 2017–present
- Followers: 1.3 million

Sergio García Maroto (born May 23, 1984), known as Knekro, is a Spanish streamer, YouTuber, and former esports player. He's part of Ibai Llanos's and Gerard Piqué's esports team Movistar KOI.

== Biography ==
Sergio García was born in Madrid. In 2000, at age 16, he took part in the first Pokémon World Championships, winning first place in Spain and third place in the world finals held in Sydney, Australia.

In 2012, he began his career as a YouTuber, creating the first guides in Spanish for the competitive video game League of Legends. In 2017, he started broadcasting on Twitch, where he is one of the main Spanish-language streamers.

Knekro belongs to the esports team KOI, where he participates as a content creator on League of Legends and competitive Pokémon, which led to his move to Barcelona in 2021. Despite his involvement as a Pokémon content creator, his participation in Twitch Pokémon series and collaborations with other streamers as a Pokémon trainer, Sergio Garcia declares himself retired from competitive esports.

In 2022, he was nominated in the best track streamer category of the Esland Awards.

In January 2024, the merger of the esports teams KOI, MAD Lions and Movistar Riders was announced. The organization announced the creation of an international competitive Pokémon team, with the participation of Knekro in the decision of signings and broadcasting of events, and its participation in the Pokémon World Championship 2024 under the Movistar KOI brand.

In January 2025, Knekro's Twitch channel became the official Movistar KOI co-stream of the League of Legends EMEA Championship, becoming the most watched Twitch channel in Spanish that month.
