= TheGrefg =

Spanish YouTuber & Twitch streamer (born 1997)

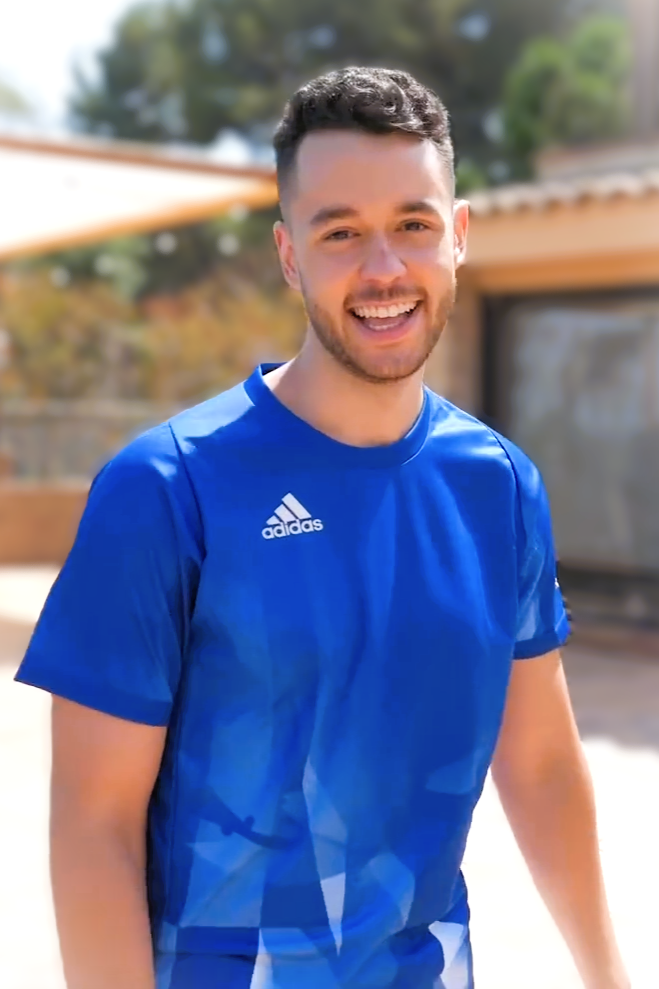
- David Cánovas in 2021
- Born: David Cánovas Martínez; 24 April 1997 (age 29); Alhama de Murcia, Region of Murcia, Spain
- Occupations: YouTuber; Twitch streamer

Kick information
- Channel: TheGrefg
- Followers: 337 thousand (13 October 2024)

Twitch information
- Channel: TheGrefg
- Followers: 12.3 million

YouTube information
- Channel: TheGrefg
- Years active: 2012–present
- Genre: Gaming
- Subscribers: 19.6 million
- Views: 7.4 billion

David Cánovas Martínez (Spanish: [daˈβið ˈkanoβas maɾˈtineθ], born 24 April 1997), better known as TheGrefg or simply Grefg, is a Spanish YouTuber and Twitch streamer. With 19.6 million subscribers, he has one of the most-subscribed Spanish YouTube channels, and is among the most-followed Twitch channels with over 12.3 million followers on that platform.

TheGrefg used to hold the Guinness World Record for the most concurrent viewers for a Twitch stream after achieving a peak concurrent viewership of 2,468,668 during the live presentation of his Fortnite outfit on 11 January 2021. This record was broken by Ibai Llanos in 2022 when a total of 3.3 million viewers arrived during La Velada del año 2.

== Career ==
David Cánovas Martínez was born on 24 April 1997, in Alhama de Murcia, Murcia, Spain, according to several interviews, he began to be interested in the subject of video games since he was a child, he started his YouTube channel on 30 January 2012, when he was 14 years old.

In 2018 he moved to Andorra to pay less taxes. In January 2020, Epic Games announced that a TheGrefg-based cosmetic outfit would be added to Fortnite alongside other real-life personalities associated with the game, such as Ninja and Loserfruit. In October 2020, Forbes Spain included Cánovas as the sixth top influencer in Spain for the year, In April 2021, was again included on a cover of the magazine Forbes.

He will fight at La Velada del Año V against Westcol, which will be held on 26 July 2025 at Estadio La Cartuja in Sevilla.

=== Writing career ===
Martínez has written three books; The first book titled "Rescate en White Angel (The G-Squad)” was released in 2017, the second, titled “Los secretos de YouTube” was released in 2018, and the third book titled "Todo lo que necesitas saber sobre esports” made in collaboration with Goorgo and MethodzSick and released on 4 June 2019, tells the “secrets to succeed in e-Sports”.

=== Other works ===
To date, he has released three songs. The first one, titled "Gracias a ti” was to celebrate his 4 million subscribers. Again, to celebrate 10 million subscribers, he released a song in collaboration with Zarcort and Piter-G. Lastly, to present his Minecraft series Calvaland released a song titled the same. Martínez was one of the presenters along with Willyrex and El Rubius of the program Top Gamers Academy, In January 2022, he held the ESLAND Awards ceremony, in which several Spanish-speaking content creators would receive their recognition.

Since 2021 he is the owner of Grefito SLU, a real estate company in Escaldes. An 80-year woman received an eviction denunciation from Grefito, the company lost the trial, and the building was put on sale.

== Personal life ==
In 2018 he started a relationship with Gemma Gallardo, but they split up in mid-2022. As of 2024, he is in a relationship with Sofía Fitness.

== Awards and nominations ==
Year	Award	Category	Result	Ref.
2018	Nickelodeon Kids' Choice Awards	Favorite Spanish Influencer	Nominated	
2019	The Game Awards	Content Creator of the Year	Nominated	
2021	Esports Awards	Streamer of the Year	Nominated	
2021	The Game Awards	Content Creator of the Year	Nominated	

== See also ==
- List of most-followed Twitch channels
