= Willyrex =

Spanish YouTuber, author (born 1993)

- Born: Guillermo Díaz Ibáñez; 9 May 1993 (age 33); Madrid, Spain
- Occupations: YouTube personality; author
- Partner: Cristina

YouTube information
- Channels: Willyrex; TheWillyrex
- Years active: 2011–present
- Genres: Gameplay; vlog
- Subscribers: 18.3 million (TheWillyrex); 17.2 million (Willyrex)
- Views: 7.2 billion (TheWillyrex); 5.4 billion (Willyrex)
- Last updated: 22 October 2025

Guillermo Díaz Ibáñez, better known as Willyrex (born 9 May 1993), is a Spanish YouTube personality and author. He has two YouTube channels: Willyrex and TheWillyrex. As of November 2017, his YouTube channel TheWillyrex has over 12 million subscribers and 4.35 billion views, making it the 3rd most subscribed channel in Spain and the 75th most subscribed channel in the world.

== Biography ==
Guillermo Díaz, better known by his YouTube name Willyrex, is a Spanish YouTube personality and author. He has two YouTube channels: Willyrex and TheWillyrex.

As of November 2017, his YouTube channel TheWillyrex has over 12 million subscribers and 4.35 billion views, making it the 3rd most subscribed channel in Spain and the 75th most subscribed channel in the world. According to Diaz, he originally started his YouTube channel to share gameplays with his friends.

Diaz has said that he created his YouTube name, Willyrex, as a messenger screen name when he was about 11 years old- years before starting his YouTube channel. He chose willy, because it is a nickname for the English equivalent of his first name, William. He chose rex because it was Latin for the word king.

Diaz began studying a degree in Business Administration but left school a few months after starting to focus full-time on YouTube.

In 2014 he moved to Los Angeles then in early 2016 he moved to Andorra.

On 21 August 2019, he announced he will marry his girlfriend Cristina. On 3 August 2020, Willyrex announced that the couple were expecting their first child. In December of that same year, his YouTube channel was temporarily deleted.

== Books ==
Along with fellow YouTuber Vegetta777, he has published a saga of books titled Wigetta.

== Games ==
Willyrex and fellow YouTubers Vegetta777 and sTaXx created a mobile game for Microsoft, Android and iOS called Karmarun, which has been downloaded over 2 million times.
