= El Rubius =

Spanish YouTuber and Twitch streamer (born 1990)

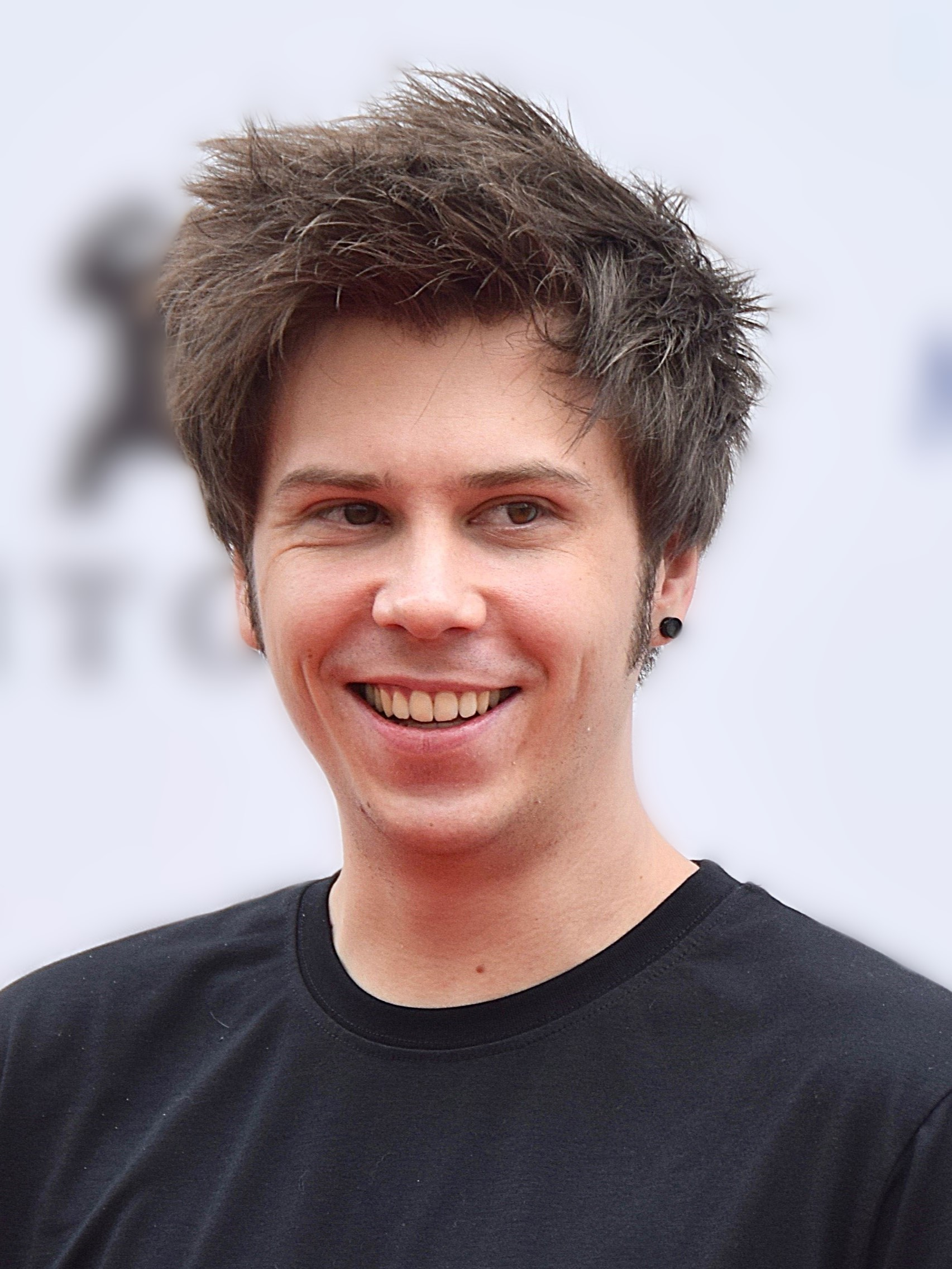
- El Rubius in the 2018 Sitges Film Festival
- Born: Rubén Doblas Gundersen; 13 February 1990 (age 36); Mijas, Andalusia, Spain
- Occupations: YouTuber; streamer; actor; businessman
- Partner: Irina Isasia (2016–present)

Twitch information
- Channel: Rubius
- Followers: 16 million

YouTube information
- Channel: elrubiusOMG
- Years active: 2006–present
- Genres: Gaming; comedy; vlog; Let's play
- Subscribers: 40.7 million
- Views: 8.25 billion
- Last updated: 02 August 2026
- Website: elrubius.com

Rubén Doblas Gundersen (Spanish: [ruˈβen ˈdoβlas ˈɣundeɾsen]; (Note: In isolation, Doblas and Gundersen are pronounced [ˈdoβlas] and [ˈɡundeɾsen], respectively.) born 13 February 1990), better known as elrubiusOMG or simply El Rubius (Spanish: [el ˈruβjus]), is a Spanish YouTuber whose channel primarily consists of gameplays and vlogs. He has the most subscribers in Spain and was among the top 50 most subscribed-to channels of the platform in the world.

In 2014 he published El Libro Troll (English: The Troll Book). During 2015 and 2017 he published a total of three comics from his Virtual Hero series. He was also part of an anime series based on the comics. A tweet from his official Twitter account in 2016 was once the most retweeted tweet in the world.

In 2016, Time magazine included him in its list of "next generation leaders" and named him an "online conqueror". In 2018, he achieved the world record for live viewers during an online YouTube broadcast for a tournament of the Fortnite video game. He is one of the most popular streamers on Twitch, with the fifth-most-followed Twitch channel in the world.

== Early life ==
Rubén Doblas Gundersen was born on 13 February 1990 in Mijas, Andalusia, Spain. He is the son of a Norwegian mother named Bente and a Spanish father, with a younger sister called Liv on his mother's side and two brothers on his father's side. When he was three years old, his parents divorced; he and his mother moved to Bergen, where she became a partner with another Spanish person named Héctor, to whom Rubius often refers as "The Godfather" in his videos. He moved back to Madrid because of this, where he went through primary and secondary school. His first console was an SNES, to which he admitted that it was essential to develop his love for video games and geek culture and that if it hadn't been for that he would never have reached where he was.

In his high school stage, his parents separated again when aged 16. He relocated to Norway again and finished his studies and returned to Spain with his godfather. He worked as an intern and in a supermarket there. He later entered to study 3D modelling and animation in Arteneo School in Madrid.

== Career ==
=== First channel and beginnings (2006–2011) ===
Rubén Doblas Gundersen created his first YouTube channel in 2006 under the name "elrubius". He claimed this channel to be a play on words, referring to his name and the fact that he had blonde hair when he was little. His first video "The audience" was uploaded on 8 December 2006. His video was a montage of the video game Grand Theft Auto IV in English. During 2011, he began regularly uploading videos of montages of the newer video game Skyrim, where Rubius commented on unusual and humorous situations in-game. In January 2012, despite the growing popularity of his videos, he announced that he would change his channel because the one he had at that time could not be associated with a contract with Machinima Network, Inc. This was due to uploading three copyright infringement complaints on YouTube.

=== Growth and popularity (2012–2013) ===
On 19 December 2011, El Rubius created another channel under the name of "elrubiusOMG". In January, he began to reupload his old The Elder Scrolls V: Skyrim montages, in addition to other montages in which he commented on situations of various video games such as Battlefield and Happy Wheels. At this time, it was a very popular format on the platform. Rubius was one of the pioneers in making this type of videos known in the Spanish-speaking community. Its popularity began to increase dramatically. On 28 January 2012, he created the video "MI CARA". He revealed his identity for the first time on YouTube there. At this time, he created a segment on his channel called "(X video game) in 1 minute". In these videos, he tried to summarise a video game in an ironic and humorous way. This section became one of the most viral sections on YouTube in Spain at this time.

On 14 March 2012, he uploaded a parody of Chayanne's song "Torero", where he modified its title and lyrics to "Minero", alluding to the Minecraft video game. The song was based on the parody. Because the popularity of the video game was emerging at that time, the video became extremely viral. Today, it is the most viewed video in the channel's history, with almost 100 million views. The popularity of Rubius and the channel continued to rise and rise. On 27 April 2012, the channel reached 100,000 subscribers, which Rubius celebrated by streaming on YouTube, answering questions from his followers.

On 22 July 2012, his channel reached 200,000 subscribers. On 29 July, he uploaded a vlog where he met Mangel (Miguel Ángel Rogel) for the first time in-person, another Spanish YouTuber who met Rubius on internet forums when both were teenagers. Rubius and Mangel announced that both would move to live together in Madrid when they got a contract with a production company called BGames. There, they had to dedicate themselves to creating videos for the platform. On 16 September 2012, his channel reached 300,000 subscribers. On 7 October, Rubius uploaded a video of him in Chatroulette. Chatroulette is a video conference website. There, Rubius showed situations in his conversations with strangers on which the website had. Three days later, he uploaded a collaboration with Willyrex. He remained the largest YouTuber in Spain until 2012. A week later, his channel reached 400,000 subscribers. In December, his channel reached 500,000 subscribers, which Rubius announced by uploading a montage of himself.

Rubius became the most subscribed Spanish channel in November 2012 by surpassing fellow YouTuber Willyrex. In January 2013, he started another segment called "Meet The Rubius" (alluding to a popular video game series Team Fortress 2 on YouTube). Rubius recounted anecdotes from his personal life there. In a period of two months, on 18 February 2013, his channel reached one million subscribers, becoming part of the 10 Spanish-speaking channels that had that reached that level (or higher) at that time. Two months later, his channel reached two million subscribers. In June 2013, he was invited by Ubisoft Spain as a content creator for E3. In July, he attended the Gamepolis event in Malaga, alongside Mangel and other famous YouTube content creators.

=== 10 million subscribers, media appearances and other projects (2014–2015) ===
In 2014, El Rubius published an interactive book full of challenges titled El Libro Troll (English: The Troll Book). The book reached number one in sales in Spain for eight weeks and was a bestseller at the Madrid Book Fair 2014. The Superintendencia de Industria y Comercio deemed it unsuitable for children and teenagers. It was described by parents as a sexual book. He also made a cameo appearance, this being in Torrente 5, a Spanish comedy film by Santiago Segura. On 25 September, he announced via video that Microsoft would contact him to participate in the Spanish dub for the video game Sunset Overdrive. In February 2015, he became the first Spanish YouTuber whose channel reached 10 million subscribers. In April 2015, he participated in the first edition of the Club Media Fest in Argentina.

On 2 June, he had an interview on Antena 3 in the Spanish programme Al rincón de pensar. The programme's journalist was Risto Mejide. Rubius couldn't suppress his tears after telling Mejide that he was suffering from depression due to the burden of fame and being away from his family. Spanish publishing group Planeta published Rubius' first comic, titled El Rubius: Virtual Hero, in September 2015. In October 2015, he received the Diamond Play Button at the YouTube 10th Anniversary Party in Madrid, along with fellow Spanish YouTuber Vegetta777. During this month, he participated in the second edition of the Club Media Fest in Argentina and Chile. In December, he made a collaboration in a video with the Spanish singer Edurne dancing in the video game Just Dance.

=== Problems with the press and censorship, direct and hiatus (2016–2018) ===
In February 2016, El Rubius denounced the Spanish newspaper El Mundo through a video, saying that they had distorted and manipulated an interview that he himself granted, in order to "sell more". He announced that he would not give any more reports or interviews for the press. In April, Rubius participated in the Colombian edition of the Club Media Fest, where he made a presentation mixing live electronic music, received the "Youtuber of the Year" award at the 1st Play Awards ceremony held in Palma de Mallorca, and in April 2016 he uploaded a music video titled "Pokemon HEYEYEYEAH" with Narehop, a parody of What's Up? (1993) by Rock band 4 Non Blondes. In May he participated in a YouTube event in New York with the most famous YouTubers in the world, where he met PewDiePie in-person. During the event, he organised an event for people over 18 in Barcelona where he performed a concert mixing music. The second part of Virtual Hero, whose title is Virtual Hero II: La torre imposible, was published in June 2016.

After surpassing 20 million subscribers in August 2016, Rubius made a big draw with a tweet saying "Limonada". As of September 2019, it is the fifth most-shared tweet in history. In September, he uploaded a video criticising YouTube's system of new anti-censorship rules. There Rubius joked that he was going to have to change his style as "he didn't want to lose his partner and that he loved his money". However, during the video, he went on to break all the new rules imposed, with the video being demonetised and age-restricted. A couple of weeks later, he uploaded another video denouncing a new magazine dedicated to gossip about YouTubers that had leaked photos of himself and his partner on their vacations, declaring "I can't believe how this shit of continuing to invade people's privacy is still legal in the middle of 2016". In 2016, the HeYou Games company launched the YouTurbo video game for iOS and Android. There Rubius is a playable character along with other YouTubers, such as Willyrex, DaniRep, iTownGamePlay, TheGrefg, and more.

In December 2016, he was part of the promotion of the film Passengers, making a video in collaboration with Jennifer Lawrence and Chris Pratt, protagonists of the film. Later, during an interview with Lawrence on Jimmy Kimmel's late night show, he and the video were mentioned. During 2016 and 2017 he participated in Spanish advertising campaigns of Fanta. In June he participated in the edition of the Club Media Fest in Mexico. In October he participated in the edition of the Club Media Fest in Peru. The third and last part of his comic series Virtual Hero was published in April 2017. It was entitled Virtual Hero III: La máscara del troll. In October 2017, El Rubius announced the production of Virtual Hero, an animated television series produced by Motion Pictures from Barcelona and Jaruyi studio from South Korea, together with Movistar+ and Zeppelin TV, based on his comic series. The plot follows the adventures of Rubius, who must free the 100 best gamers of Trollmask, a vengeful enemy, in a virtual world.

=== Platform switch to Twitch (2018–present) ===
At the beginning of March 2018, Rubius released a video called La verdad sobre Rubius (English:The Truth About Rubius). There he made an analogy of his personality in his videos on YouTube and in real life introducing a "twin" of his named Gundersen. The video was well received by its followers. It had many likes. In March 2018, El Rubius broke his world record during a live broadcast of Fortnite, having more than a million viewers tuning in and 100 Spanish-speaking streamers. In this way, he destroyed the record that the streamer had until then, Ninja. On 25 May he announced that he would withdraw from YouTube for a time due to the fact that in the previous months he began to feel stress, anxious and nervous when recording videos and doing live shows.

Rubius later reached 30 million subscribers in July. On 3 October 2018, El Rubius uploaded a documentary about his life on his YouTube channel. It was released on Movistar+ on 11 October 2018. It was titled De Rubén a Rubius: un viaje de un Virtual Hero. On 12 October 2018, Virtual Hero, the first anime series released in Spain, premiered on Movistar+. It is directed by Alexis Barroso, illustrated by Lolita Aldea, written by Juan Torres, and based on Rubius' eponymous comic. After his return, Rubius announced that he would start directing on Twitch and prioritise that platform over YouTube, which he would take more as a secondary job. He also resumed the activity of his old original channel elrubius to reupload his content on Twitch there. Because of this, he renamed it to "Rubius Z".

In May 2019 he announced that Epic Games contacted him to hold a competition in Fortnite. There players had to speedrun a map of his and the winner took 3 million euros. In mid-2019 he made a cameo in the movie Father There Is Only One. During January 2020, he carried out a promotion for the film Bad Boys for Life. There he uploaded a video together with the protagonists of the film Will Smith and Martin Lawrence. In February, he made a transmission on YouTube where he counted down to the Season 2 premiere of the Virtual Hero anime. In July, he uploaded a teaser on Twitter where he was going to make an announcement in response to various rumors about the renewal of his contract with Amazon. On July 15, he uploaded a video to YouTube called "The Final Decision". He imitated the video of the announcement of the signing of streamer Ninja to the streaming platform Facebook Gaming there. In reality, he announced that he was staying. Watch Dogs: Legion, a video game developed by Ubisoft and released on 29 October 2020, has El Rubius as a playable character.

In October and November 2020, he was one of the coaches in Atresmedia's Top Gamers Academy video game talent show. On 7 November 2020, Rubius uploaded a video on his YouTube channel where he commented on the massiveness of his community and the negative effects this has on social networks to celebrate reaching 39 million subscribers on his channel. Rubius also participated in another promotion with Sony to announce his new ninth-generation video game console the PlayStation 5, along with other YouTubers and popular people from Spain such as Josep Pedrerol, Michelle Jenner, Santiago Segura, Joaquín Reyes, David Broncano, Koke, Carolina Marín, Amaya Valdemoro, Marc Gasol, etc.

In December 2020, Rubius uploaded a video to his main YouTube channel, announcing that he was opening a Pokémon card box valued at $20,000 on his Twitch channel. On 23 December he performed the promised opening and the livestream reached 350,000 viewers, achieving the fifth most viewed Spanish-speaking broadcast. On 2 January Rubius announced via Twitter that, together with Alexby11, they created a Rust series called Egoland that brought together 70 streamers. In their debut they achieved 1.2 million viewers. It was one of the biggest events of 2021 on Twitch and this led to many more series being created with content creators.

In October 2021, he announced that he would be part of the movie Uncharted, posting a photo on social media with actor Tom Holland. On the occasion of the tenth anniversary of his first video on YouTube, Amazon Prime Video announced through the Jove Orquestra Simfònica from Barcelona playing the theme Minero the premiere of Rubius X, a documentary about the YouTuber for the 'streaming' platform at the beginning of next year in more than 240 countries.

== Content and reception style ==
The content of El Rubius' channels are primarily gameplays, sketches, vlogs, and montages, mostly related to video games, with the particularity that they are made with humour, satire, and sarcasm. One of the most notorious points of its success and virality in his videos is due to the charisma, naturalness, simplicity, and direct language that he has, in addition to connecting with his audience and establishing a strong connection with the people (in average between 14 and 23 years old) who identify with him. Unlike other television personalities or content creators, he does not play a character, but only shows himself naturally, leading to greater acceptance from the masses.

When he first appeared on YouTube trending in 2012, the public was used to commentators like Willyrex, who sought to highlight the details of a video game, in addition to summarising plays in various online games. Rubius offered a change of fresh air, with a more dynamic and more edited content, in addition to performing it with acid, black, absurd, and surreal humour.

GQ magazine described him as "the throbbing incarnation of a generation gap", in addition to commenting: "His videos encapsulate a high school mentality that we would never, ever think would be legitimized within such a massive platform. That has been his true triumph: turning something as fleeting as adolescent immaturity, or the clumsy search for identity through the outburst or bullshit, into pure spectacle". The New York Times wrote that "in the videos it is always clear that he lives between two dimensions, that of the screen with its massive audience and that of his room (in a hotel when he travels), his cat and his friends. This double reality leads in The Troll Book, the comics and the anime series".

== Controversies ==
During January 2021, El Rubius announced via a Twitch broadcast that he was going to move to Andorra to live closer to his friends and avoid the public recognition that he had while living in Madrid. This caused controversy in social networks since several YouTubers and streamers had taken this initiative due to the lower tax burden in that country.

During the same statement, he denounced that a Spanish Treasury official charged him in the media for the decision he had made, taking it as unethical. The former second deputy Prime Minister of the government of Spain Pablo Iglesias criticised this decision through his Twitter account, retweeting a tweet where former athlete Juanma López Iturriaga explained that YouTubers moved to avoid paying taxes.

== Awards and nominations ==
Year	Award	Category	Result	Ref.
2016	Play Awards	YouTuber of the Year	Won	
2022	ESLAND Awards	Streamer of the Year	Nominated	

== See also ==
- List of most-followed Twitch channels
