= Gamers' Choice Awards =

Annual video games awards ceremony

- Awarded for: Excellence in video games
- Sponsored by: CBS
- Date: December 9, 2018
- Venue: The Fonda Theatre, Hollywood, California
- Country: United States
- Hosted by: Carrie Keagan and Marcus "djWHEAT" Graham
- Final award: 2018

Highlights
- Most awards: Fortnite (5)
- Most nominations: God of War (7)
- Fan Favorite Game: Fortnite
- Website: gamerschoice.tv

Television/radio coverage
- Network: CBS

The Gamers' Choice Awards was an award show that honored the video game industry in 2018. It was held on December 3, 2018 and broadcast on December 9, 2018 on CBS. It was the first gaming and Esports awards show to be televised on a broadcast network.

== Event ==
The idea for the show came from Michael Burg, executive producer for the Teen Choice Awards. Victor Borachuk along with his company JupiterReturn, left the project prior to the show's airing.

The awards were based on fan voting and online public voting was held beginning November 17, 2018 to decide the winners. Two previews shows were held on November 17 and November 18, 2018 and aired on CBS. The initial shows were nomination shows prior to the main show on December 9.

The award show was held on December 3, 2018 at The Fonda Theatre in Hollywood, California. KISS performed followed by a tribute to Stan Lee. The competition featured 150 nominees in 22 categories.

The show premiered on CBS on December 9, 2018. Winners included Ninja who was awarded Fan Favorite Esports Player of the Year, Fan Favorite Gamer Moment, and the 2018 Super Nova Honor. Other winners included TimTheTatman and Pokimane who were named Streamers of the Year. Fortnite led the award shows with five fan favorite awards. Additional winners included Terry Crews for Fan Favorite Celebrity Gamer and Snoop Dogg for Fan Favorite Music Artist Gamer.

== Winners and nominees ==
=== Video games ===
Titles in bold won in their respective category.

Fan Favorite Game	Most Anticipated Game	Fan Favorite Action Game
**Fortnite** — Epic Games; God of War — Santa Monica Studio/Sony Interactive Entertainment; Spider-Man — Insomniac Games/Sony Interactive Entertainment; Overwatch — Blizzard Entertainment; Dragon Ball FighterZ — Arc System Works/Bandai Namco Entertainment/NIS America; Celeste — Maddy Makes Games; League of Legends — Riot Games; Call of Duty: Black Ops 4 — Treyarch/Activision; Assassin's Creed Odyssey — Ubisoft; Monster Hunter: World — Capcom	**The Last of Us Part II** — Naughty Dog/Sony Interactive Entertainment; Kingdom Hearts III — Square Enix; The Elder Scrolls VI — Bethesda Softworks; Death Stranding — Kojima Productions/Sony Interactive Entertainment; Cyberpunk 2077 — CD Projekt Red/CD Projekt; Sekiro: Shadows Die Twice — FromSoftware/Activision; Rage 2 — Avalanche Studios/Bethesda Softworks; Days Gone — Bend Studio/Sony Interactive Entertainment; Anthem — Bioware/Electronic Arts; Tom Clancy's The Division 2 — Massive Entertainment/Ubisoft	**Spider-Man** — Insomniac Games/Sony Interactive Entertainment; God of War — Santa Monica Studio/Sony Interactive Entertainment; Assassin's Creed Odyssey — Ubisoft; Shadow of the Tomb Raider — Eidos Montréal/Square Enix; Far Cry 5 — Ubisoft
Fan Favorite Single Player Gaming Experience	Fan Favorite Multiplayer Game	Fan Favorite Shooter Game
**Spider-Man** — Insomniac Games/Sony Interactive Entertainment; Celeste — Maddy Makes Games; God of War — Santa Monica Studio/Sony Interactive Entertainment; Assassin's Creed Odyssey — Ubisoft; Detroit: Become Human — Quantic Dream/Sony Interactive Entertainment	**Fortnite** — Epic Games; Call of Duty: Black Ops 4 — Treyarch/Activision; Destiny 2: Forsaken — Bungie/Activision; World of Warcraft: Battle for Azeroth — Blizzard Entertainment; Overwatch — Blizzard Entertainment; A Way Out — Hazelight Studios/Electronic Arts; PlayerUnknown's Battlegrounds — PUBG Corporation; Monster Hunter: World — Capcom	**Call of Duty: Black Ops 4** — Treyarch/Activision; Overwatch — Blizzard Entertainment; Destiny 2: Forsaken — Bungie/Activision; Quake Champions — id Software/Bethesda Softworks; Far Cry 5 — Ubisoft; Warframe — Digital Extremes; Tom Clancy's Rainbow Six Siege — Ubisoft
Fan Favorite Mobile Game	Fan Favorite Sports/Racing Game	Fan Favorite Family-Friendly Multiplayer Game
**Pokémon Go** — The Pokémon Company/Niantic; PlayerUnknown's Battlegrounds Mobile — PUBG Corporation/Tencent Games; Arena of Valor — Timi Studio Group/Tencent Games; Florence — Mountains/Annapurna Interactive; Alto's Odyssey — Team Alto/Snowman; Vandals — Cosmografik/Novelab/Ex Nihilo/ARTE France	**Rocket League** — Psyonix; FIFA 19 — EA Sports; NBA 2K19 — Visual Concepts/2K Sports; Forza Horizon 4 — Playground Games/Microsoft Studios; NHL 19 — EA Sports; WWE 2K19 — Yuke's/Visual Concepts/2K Sports; Madden NFL 19 — EA Sports	**Super Mario Party** — NDcube/Nintendo; Mario Tennis Aces — Camelot Software Planning/Nintendo; Overcooked 2 — Ghost Town Games/Team17; Starlink: Battle for Atlas — Ubisoft; Scribblenauts Showdown — Shiver Entertainment/Warner Bros. Interactive Entertainment; Lego The Incredibles — TT Fusion/Warner Bros. Interactive Entertainment; Just Dance 2018 — Ubisoft
Fan Favorite Esports Game	Fan Favorite Battle Royale Game	Fan Favorite Fighting Game
**Fortnite** — Epic Games; League of Legends — Riot Games; Dota 2 — Valve; Overwatch — Blizzard Entertainment; Counter-Strike: Global Offensive — Hidden Path Entertainment/Valve; Dragon Ball FighterZ — Arc System Works/Bandai Namco Entertainment/NIS America; Super Smash Bros. Melee — HAL Laboratory/Nintendo; Rocket League — Psyonix; PlayerUnknown's Battlegrounds — PUBG Corporation	**Fortnite** — Epic Games; PlayerUnknown's Battlegrounds — PUBG Corporation; Call of Duty: Black Ops 4 — Blackout — Treyarch/Activision; Realm Royale — Hi-Rez Studios; Ring of Elysium — Tencent Games/Garena; Darwin Project — Scavengers Studio; H1Z1 — Daybreak Game Company	**Dragon Ball FighterZ** — Arc System Works/Bandai Namco Entertainment/NIS America; Street Fighter V: Arcade Edition — Capcom/Dimps; Soulcalibur VI — Bandai Namco Entertainment; Street Fighter 30th Anniversary Collection — Digital Eclipse/Capcom; BlazBlue: Cross Tag Battle — Arc System Works; Fighting EX Layer — Arika
Fan Favorite Role-Playing Game	Fan Favorite MMORPG	Fan Favorite VR Game
**Monster Hunter: World** — Capcom; Path of Exile — Grinding Gear Games; Dragon Quest XI — Square Enix; Ni no Kuni II: Revenant Kingdom — Level-5 (company)/Bandai Namco Entertainment; Kingdom Come: Deliverance — Warhorse Studios/Deep Silver; Octopath Traveler — Square Enix/Acquire/Nintendo; Diablo III — Blizzard Entertainment; Pillars of Eternity II: Deadfire — Obsidian Entertainment/Versus Evil; Moonlighter — Digital Sun/11 Bit Studios	**World of Warcraft: Battle for Azeroth** — Blizzard Entertainment; The Elder Scrolls Online — ZeniMax Online Studios/Bethesda Softworks; MapleStory 2 — NSquare/Nexon; Lineage 2 Revolution — Netmarble Games; Black Desert Online — Pearl Abyss/Kakao Games; Eve Online — CCP Games; Final Fantasy XIV — Square Enix	**Beat Saber** — Beat Games; Moss — Polyarc; Pixel Ripped 1989 — Arvore Immersive Games; Brass Tactics — Hidden Path Entertainment; Sprint Vector — Survios; Creed: Rise to Glory — Survios
Most Desired Franchise Resurrection	Fan Favorite Indie Game	Fan Favorite Fall Release
**Star Wars: Knights of the Old Republic** — BioWare/LucasArts; Half-Life — Valve; F-Zero — Nintendo; Banjo Kazooie — Rare; Earthbound — HAL Laboratory; Chrono Trigger — Square; Jet Set Radio — Sega	**Subnautica** — Unknown Worlds Entertainment; Celeste — Maddy Makes Games; Dead Cells — Motion Twin; Into the Breach — Subset Games; Iconoclasts — Konjak/Bitfrost Entertainment; Donut County — Ben Esposito/Annapurna Interactive; Moonlight — MonkeyMaw	**Red Dead Redemption 2** — Rockstar Games; Fallout 76 — Bethesda Softworks; Battlefield V — EA DICE/Electronic Arts; Warframe: Fortuna — Digital Extremes
Fan Favorite Character of the Year	Fan Favorite Male Voice Actor	Fan Favorite Female Voice Actor
**Peter Parker/Spider-Man** — Spider-Man; Kratos — God of War; Lara Croft — Shadow of the Tomb Raider; Leo Caruso — A Way Out; Connor — Detroit: Become Human; Alexios and Kassandra — Assassin's Creed Odyssey	**Christopher Judge as Kratos** — God of War; Bryan Dechart as Connor — Detroit: Become Human; Jesse Williams as Markus — Detroit: Become Human; Yuri Lowenthal as Peter Parker/Spider-Man — Spider-Man; Jeremy Davies as Baldur — God of War; Greg Bryk as Joseph Seed — Far Cry 5; Michael Antonakos as Alexios — Assassin's Creed Odyssey	**Camilla Luddington as Lara Croft** — Shadow of the Tomb Raider; Valorie Curry as Kara — Detroit: Become Human; Danielle Bisutti as Freya — God of War; Laura Bailey as Mary Jane Watson — Spider-Man; Tara Platt as Yuri Watanabe — Spider-Man; Melissanthi Mahut as Kassandra — Assassin's Creed Odyssey
Fan Favorite Retro Game	Fan Favorite Retro Character	Fan Favorite Gaming Moment
**Super Mario Bros.** — Nintendo; Pong — Atari, Inc.; Space Invaders — Taito/Midway Games; The Legend of Zelda — Nintendo; Tetris — Alexey Pajitnov	**Mario** — Mario; Link — The Legend of Zelda; Donkey Kong — Donkey Kong; Pac-Man — Pac-Man; Bomberman — Bomberman; Bonk — Bonk's Adventure; Mega Man — Mega Man; Sonic the Hedgehog — Sonic the Hedgehog; Samus Aran — Metroid	**Ninja plays with Drake**; The_Happy_Hob beats the Dark Souls trilogy without taking a single hit; Red Dead Redemption 2 has the biggest opening weekend of any entertainment property; Dr DisRespect hits a $100 headshot; tyler1 returns to League of Legends; 16 year old Joseph Saelee becomes Tetris World Champion; Soviet Womble attempts a tactical strategy

=== Esports and celebrities ===
Fan Favorite Male Gamer/Streamer	Fan Favorite Female Gamer/Streamer	Fan Favorite Esports Player
**TimTheTatman**; Ninja — Tyler Blevins; Shroud — Michael Grzesiek; Dr DisRespect — Herschel Beahm IV; Tyler1 — Tyler Steinkamp; summit1g — Jaryd Lazar; Lirik — Saqib Zahid; Dr Lupo; TFUE	**Pokimane** — Imane Anys; AnneMunition; Mystik — Kat Gunn; itsHafu — Rumay Wang; KittyPlays — Kristen Michaela; Geguri — Kim Se-Yeon; Xmiramira — Amira; Juliano — Julia Kiran; zAAb — Zainab Turkie	**Ninja** (Note: In official Gamers' Choice Awards press releases, this award is listed. However, no nominations for this category were published by the Gamers' Choice Awards.)
Favorite Celebrity Gamer (Musician)	Favorite Celebrity Gamer (Athlete)	Favorite Celebrity Gamer (Actor)
**Snoop Dogg**; Marshmello; Post Malone; Drake; Lupe Fiasco; Justin Bieber	**JuJu Smith-Schuster**; Xavier Woods; Gordon Hayward; Kenny Omega; Demetrious Johnson; Ronda Rousey; Jeremy Lin; Neymar; David Price (baseball)	**Terry Crews**; Vin Diesel; Mila Kunis; Olivia Munn; Zac Efron; Henry Cavill
Fan Favorite Esports Team	Fan Favorite Esports Moment	Fan Favorite Esports Host
**FaZe Clan**; Cloud9; Team Liquid; Team SoloMid; 100 Thieves; G2 Esports; Fnatic	**Cloud9 wins Boston Major**; Cloud9's League of Legends Worlds Run; OG wins The International 2018; Mew2King wins Smash Summit 6; NRG Esports zero-second goal in Rocket League Championship Series; Evil Geniuses wins Call of Duty Championship 2018	**Alex Mendez**; Eefje Depoortere; Paul Chaloner; Alex Richardson; Rachel Quirico; Jorien van der Heijden; Sue Lee; Chris Puckett
Fan Favorite Esports Event of the Year	Fan Favorite Esports League Format	Fan Favorite Collegiate Esports Team
**Call of Duty World League**; League of Legends World Championship; The International; Overwatch League; Evolution Championship Series; ELEAGUE	**Fortnite — Community Skirmishes**; Dota 2 — Dota Pro Circuit; League of Legends — League of Legends Championship Series; Overwatch — Overwatch League; Street Fighter V — Capcom Pro Tour; Counter-Strike: Global Offensive — Counter-Strike: Global Offensive Major Championships	**Ohio State University**; Bellevue University; University of Utah; Maryville University; University of Washington; University of California, Irvine; Robert Morris University; University of California, Berkeley
Fan Favorite Esports Player (League of Legends)	Fan Favorite Esports Player (Dota 2)	Fan Favorite Esports Player (Super Smash Bros Melee)
**Faker**; Doublelift; Bjergsen; Sneaky; Aphromoo; Uzi; Svenskeren	**Miracle**; Topson; Somnus; 7ckngMad; RAMZES666; No[o]ne; ana	**Mang0**; Leffen; Hungrybox; Mew2King; Armada; Plup; aMSa
Fan Favorite Esports Player (Dragon Ball FighterZ)	Fan Favorite Esports Player (Counter-Strike: Global Offensive)	Fan Favorite Esports Player (Overwatch)
**SonicFox**; Kazunoko; NYChrisG; Moke; HookGangGod; Dogura; Go1	**s1mple**; RIMZ; FalleN; NiKo; coldzera; dev1ce	**Profit**; JJonak; Muma; SoOn; Carpe; Eqo
Fan Favorite Esports Player (Rocket League)	Fan Favorite Esports Player (Fortnite)	Fan Favorite Esports Player (PlayerUnknown's Battlegrounds)
**Squishy**; Kaydop; GarrettG; Turbopulsa; ViolentPanda; Kuxir; JSTN	**Ninja**; Tfue; Vivid; Poach; Cloakzy	**Fuzzface**; lionkk; Sambty; EscA; Pr0phie
Fan Favorite Esports Caster	Fan Favorite Esports Caster Duo	Favorite Streaming Service
**CouRage**; Rivington Bruce Bisland III; Toby "Tobiwan" Dawson; Anders Blume; Indiana "Froskurinn" Black; Clint "Maven" Evans; Mitch "Uber" Leslie; Lauren "Pansy" Scott; D'Ron "D1" Maingrette; Michael "Yipes" Mendoza	**Monte and Doa**; Artosis and Tasteless; Scar and Toph; Sajam and Tasty Steve; James Bardolph and ddk; James Chen and Ultra David; Achillos and Wolf; Brandon Smith and Richard Buckley	**Twitch**; Mixer; Facebook Gaming; YouTube Gaming

=== Other ===
Fan Favorite Gaming Device	Fan Favorite Gaming Convention
**Personal computer**; Xbox One; PlayStation 4; Nintendo Switch; Mobile phone	**TwitchCon**; BlizzCon; E3; SXSW Gaming Awards; PAX; DreamHack; MineCon
