= DrLupo =

American streamer and YouTuber (born 1987)

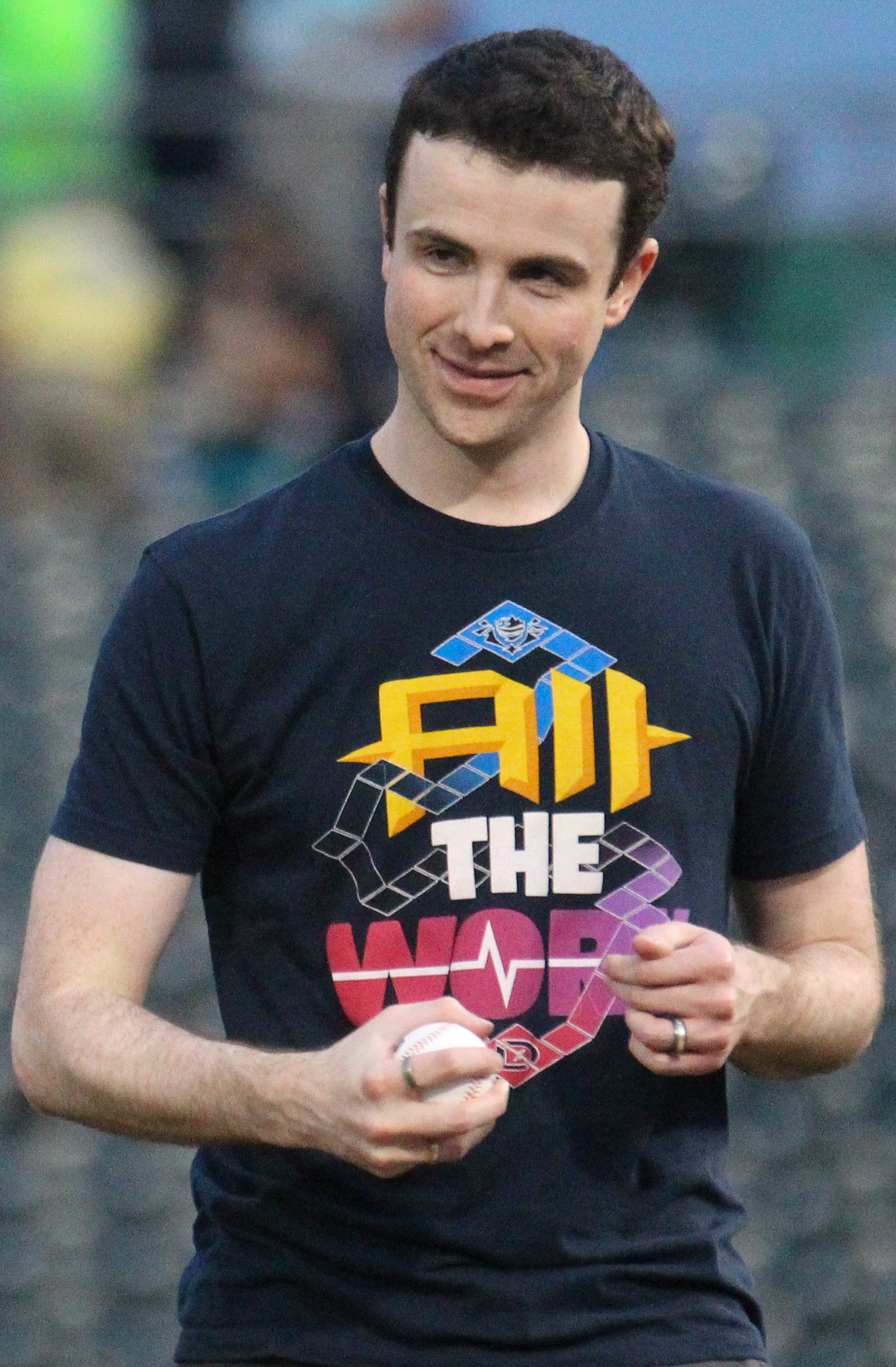
- Lupo in 2018
- Born: Benjamin Lupo; March 20, 1987 (age 39); Omaha, Nebraska, U.S.

Twitch information
- Channel: DrLupo
- Years active: 2015–2021, 2024–present
- Genre: Gaming

YouTube information
- Channel: DrLupo
- Years active: 2013–present
- Views: 222 million
- Last updated: September 4, 2025

Benjamin Lupo (born March 20, 1987), better known as DrLupo, is an American streamer and YouTuber particularly known for his charity streams in association with St. Jude Children's Research Hospital.

== Career ==
Lupo began his career streaming with Destiny before transitioning to battle royale games, such as H1Z1. His channel grew after he began playing Fortnite. He often streamed with Ninja, Myth, and TimTheTatman. In October 2018, Lupo broke the Fortnite world record for vehicle trick points with a score of 65,004,100 after operating the Quadcrasher.

In 2018, he raised $600,000 for St. Jude Children's Research Hospital. In 2019, he set a goal to raise at least $2 million for the hospital. He ended up beating his goal raising $2.3 million.

In December 2019, Lupo officially signed an exclusive deal with Twitch.

Lupo began playing Escape from Tarkov in 2020. He described the game as "unlike any other game I think right now" and noted that it could be played in multiple ways. That year he participated in an Among Us stream with notable people like Alexandria Ocasio-Cortez, Ilhan Omar, and other streamers like Pokimane, Disguised Toast, and Myth, as a get out the vote (GOTV) event. Lupo also plays Fall Guys and has been considered by some to be the best player in the world.

In August 2021, Lupo signed an exclusivity deal with YouTube as a content producer, which ended his around 1 1/2-year deal with Twitch. He returned to Twitch on September 1, 2024 after his exclusive contract with YouTube expired.

In April 2025, Lupo competed in the Chess.com $100,000 prize pool PogChamps tournament alongside other content creators. During the event, his play became the subject of discussion within the chess community and on social media that he might have been cheating. Lupo initially commented on the situation during his broadcast and later addressed it publicly the following day, issuing an apology for cheating and explaining the circumstances surrounding the game. Following the incident, Lupo offered to fund a future PogChamps tournament or donate $100,000 to a chess-related charity.

== Charity fundraising ==
From 2018 through 2022, Lupo raised over $13 million for St. Jude Children's Research Hospital through a combination of group and personal charity streams and drives. Each December, he hosts a 24-hour live stream, most recently from on-site at St. Jude Hospital.

== Awards and nominations ==
Year	Ceremony	Category	Result	Ref.
2018	The Game Awards	Content Creator of the Year	Nominated	
2019	The Game Awards	Content Creator of the Year	Nominated	
2021	The Streamer Awards	Best Philanthropic Streamer	Nominated	
2022	The Streamer Awards	Best Philanthropic Stream Event (Build Against Cancer)	Nominated	

== See also ==
- List of most-followed Twitch channels
