= JuJu Smith-Schuster =

American football player (born 1996)

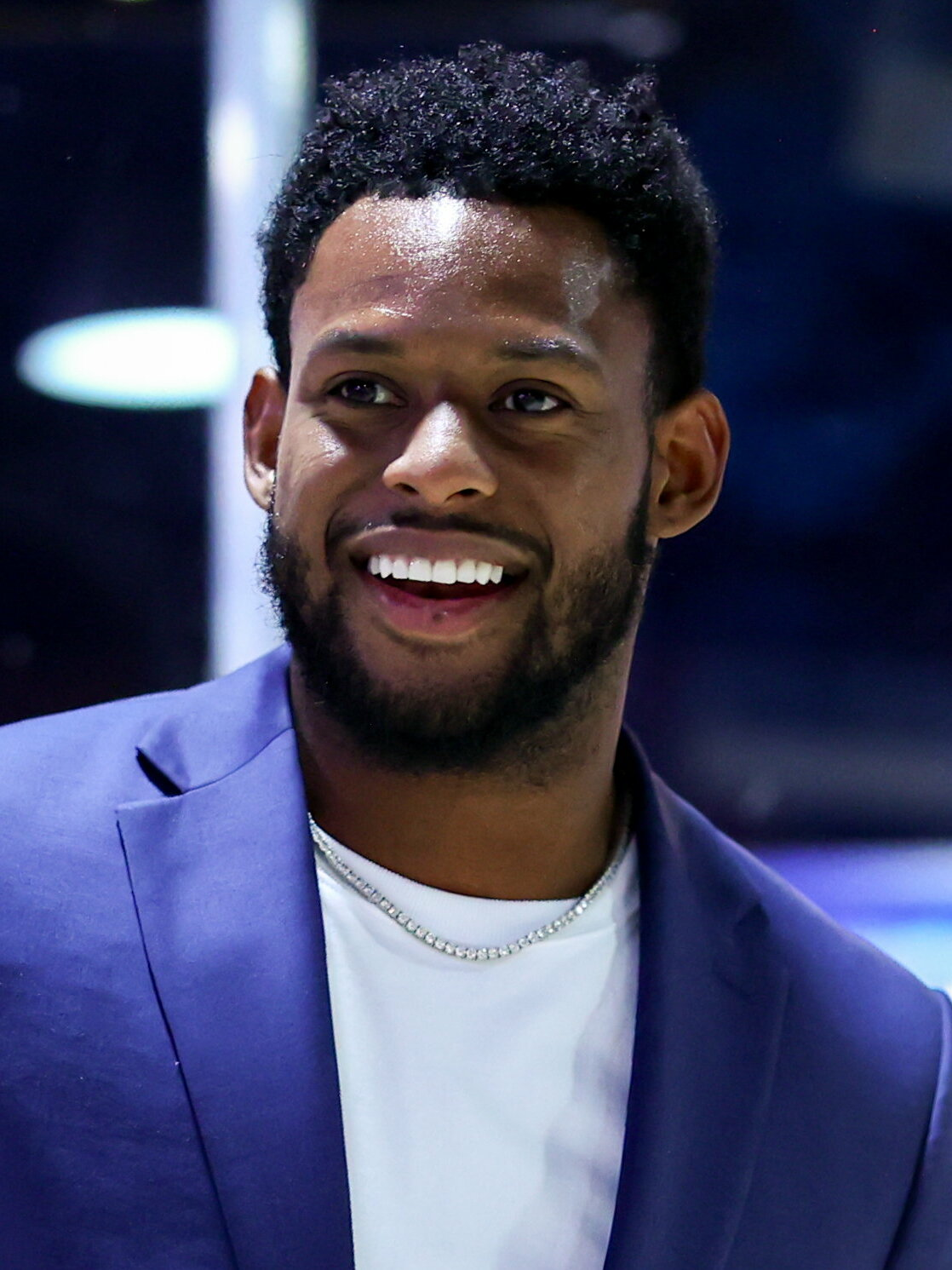
- Smith-Schuster in 2023

Profile
- Position: Wide receiver

Personal information
- Born: November 22, 1996 (age 30); Long Beach, California, U.S.
- Listed height: 6 ft 1 in (1.85 m)
- Listed weight: 215 lb (98 kg)

Career information
- High school: Long Beach Polytechnic
- College: USC (2014–2016)
- NFL draft: 2017: 2nd round, 62nd overall pick

Career history
- Pittsburgh Steelers (2017–2021); Kansas City Chiefs (2022); New England Patriots (2023); Kansas City Chiefs (2024–2025); New York Giants (2026)*
- * Offseason or practice squad member only

Awards and highlights
- Super Bowl champion (LVII); Pro Bowl (2018); PFWA All-Rookie Team (2017); Second-team All-American (2015); First-team All-Pac-12 (2015); 2× Second-team All-Pac-12 (2014, 2016); NFL record: Youngest receiver with 1,500 receiving yards

Career NFL statistics as of 2025
- Receptions: 481
- Receiving yards: 5,624
- Total touchdowns: 35
- Stats at Pro Football Reference

John Sherman Smith-Schuster (né Smith; born November 22, 1996) is an American professional football wide receiver. He played college football for the USC Trojans, earning second-team All-American honors in 2015. He was selected by the Pittsburgh Steelers in the second round of the 2017 NFL draft. With the Kansas City Chiefs, he won Super Bowl LVII.

Smith-Schuster is the holder of several NFL records, including being the youngest player to reach 2,500 career receiving yards and the first player to have two offensive touchdowns of at least 97 yards. He also holds several Steelers franchise records. Off the field, he is also known for his social media presence and affinity for TikTok, which has earned him the nickname TikTok Boy. In 2019, Smith-Schuster was ranked by Sports Business Daily as one of the NFL's most marketable players.

== Early life ==
Smith-Schuster began playing football at the age of eight. He changed his name in football program listings in 2012 from "John" to "JuJu," a nickname an aunt gave him when he was young, and legally changed his last name from "Smith" to "Smith-Schuster" while in college as a tribute to his step-father. In his youth, Smith-Schuster was coached by Snoop Dogg when he played youth football with the Snoop Youth Football League, where Snoop gave Smith-Schuster the nickname "Sportscenter," telling him that he believed one day his highlights would be shown on the flagship ESPN show.

He later attended Long Beach Polytechnic High School in Long Beach, California, the high school that at that time had the record for sending the most football players to careers in the NFL out of any in the United States. He played wide receiver and safety for the school's Jackrabbits football team. Smith-Schuster was rated by Rivals.com as a five-star recruit and was ranked as the second-best wide receiver in his class and the 24th-best player overall. He initially decided to attend Oregon, but then announced he would attend the University of Southern California (USC) to play college football under then-head coach Steve Sarkisian during his televised commitment.

== College career ==
Smith-Schuster earned immediate playing time as a true freshman in 2014. In his first career game, he had four receptions for 123 yards against Fresno State in the 52–13 victory. Against the Washington State Cougars, he had six receptions for 74 yards and three touchdowns in the 44–17 victory. He finished the 2014 season with 54 receptions for 724 yards and five touchdowns.

In the Trojans' second game of the 2015 season, Smith-Schuster had ten receptions for 192 yards and two touchdowns in a win over Idaho. He followed that up with eight receptions for 153 yards and a touchdown in a loss to Stanford in the next game. As a sophomore in 2015, he played in 14 games and led the team with 89 receptions for 1,454 receiving yards and 10 touchdowns.

On October 1, 2016, Smith-Schuster had seven receptions for 123 yards and three touchdowns in a win over Arizona State. Two weeks later, in a win over Arizona, he had nine receptions for 132 yards and three touchdowns. As a junior in 2016 the Trojans used Smith-Schuster less. He played in 13 games with 914 receiving yards and 10 touchdowns.

That year he also helped the Trojans to a victory in the Rose Bowl over the Penn State Nittany Lions, catching seven passes for 133 yards and a receiving touchdown over the course of the game.

After the 2016 season, Smith-Schuster announced on Twitter that he had decided to forgo his senior year and enter the 2017 NFL draft, before signing with sports agency Roc Nation. Fellow USC alum Lynn Swann said of Smith-Schuster's pro-potential based upon his college career, "He's got the size. He's got the strength. He's got the attitude ... In Juju, you've got a guy who's got the kind of versatility you might be looking for." Though he left before graduation, Smith-Schuster later returned to take summer courses at USC in order to work towards finishing his university degree.

== Professional career ==
=== Pre-draft ===
Smith-Schuster received an invitation to the NFL Combine and performed nearly all of the combine drills and positional drills except for the three-cone drill and short shuttle. He opted to attend USC's Pro Day and performed the short shuttle and three-cone drill. In addition, he performed the vertical and broad jump and improved his combine number on both. The Dallas Cowboys were the only team to hold a private workout with Smith-Schuster and showed heavy interest in him. He was ranked as the fourth best wide receiver in the draft by Sports Illustrated and ESPN, and ninth by NFLDraftScout.com and draft analyst Mel Kiper Jr.

External videos
- Smith-Schuster's NFL Combine Workout
- Juju Smith-Schuster runs the 40-yard dash
- Juju Smith-Schuster bench presses 15 reps

Pre-draft measurables
Height	Weight	Arm length	Hand span	Wingspan	40-yard dash	10-yard split	20-yard split	20-yard shuttle	Three-cone drill	Vertical jump	Broad jump	Bench press
6 ft 1 3/8 in (1.86 m)	215 lb (98 kg)	32 7/8 in (0.84 m)	10 1/2 in (0.27 m)	6 ft 5 3/4 in (1.97 m)	4.54 s	1.55 s	2.65 s	4.18 s	6.93 s	33.5 in (0.85 m)	10 ft 3 in (3.12 m)	15 reps
All values from NFL Combine/USC's Pro Day

=== Pittsburgh Steelers ===
External videos
- Steelers draft Smith-Schuster 62nd overall
- Smith-Schuster emotional after draft call

==== 2017 season ====
The Pittsburgh Steelers selected Smith-Schuster in the second round (62nd overall) of the 2017 NFL draft. He was the youngest player selected in the 2017 Draft and was the 13th USC wide receiver drafted in the last 15 years. On May 17, 2017, the Steelers signed him to a four-year, $4.19 million contract with $1.84 million guaranteed and a signing bonus of $1.19 million.

Smith-Schuster entered training camp competing with Sammie Coates, Darrius Heyward-Bey, Eli Rogers, Marcus Tucker, and Justin Hunter to be the Steelers' third option at wide receiver on their depth chart. He was named the sixth wide receiver on the Steelers' depth chart to begin the regular season behind Antonio Brown, Martavis Bryant, Heyward-Bey, Rogers, and Hunter.

Smith-Schuster made his NFL debut in the Steelers' season-opening victory over the Cleveland Browns and was credited with his first career start as a kick returner, returning one kick for four yards. When Smith-Schuster made his debut, he was the youngest player in the NFL. In Week 2, Smith-Schuster recorded his first career reception and caught his first career touchdown on a four-yard pass from quarterback Ben Roethlisberger, as the Steelers defeated the Minnesota Vikings by a score of 26–9. During the Vikings game, Smith-Schuster became the youngest NFL player to score a touchdown since running back Andy Livingston in 1964. He also became the second-youngest player in NFL history to catch a touchdown behind Arnie Herber, who was 60 days younger than Smith-Schuster when he caught a touchdown in 1930.

During Week 7 against the Cincinnati Bengals, Smith-Schuster caught his third touchdown pass of the season, a 31-yard reception, becoming the first player in NFL history to score three touchdowns before the age of 21. On October 29, Smith-Schuster made his first career start at wide receiver and had a breakout performance with a season-high seven receptions for 193 receiving yards and scored a 97-yard touchdown during a 20–15 victory against the Detroit Lions. The 97-yard touchdown reception was also the longest pass play in team history and the longest touchdown reception in the league during the 2017 season. Smith-Schuster started at wide receiver in place of Martavis Bryant, who was benched by head coach Mike Tomlin after publicly asking for a trade. His 193 yards was second only to Jimmy Orr's 205 in 1958 for the most receiving yards by a Steelers rookie and the most by any NFL rookie since Mike Evans' 209 in Week 11 of 2014. He was named AFC Offensive Player of the Week for his Week 8 performance.

On December 5, Smith-Schuster was suspended for one game after delivering a blindside block to Bengals' linebacker Vontaze Burfict in Week 13. In Week 17, he had a 96-yard kick return for a touchdown and also caught nine passes for 143 yards and a touchdown during a 28–24 victory over the Browns. With this performance, Smith-Schuster became the youngest player in NFL history to have over 1,000 all-purpose yards. He was also named AFC Special Teams Player of the Week for his kick return touchdown. He finished the season with 58 receptions for 917 yards and seven touchdowns, with the latter two statistics leading all rookies. He was named to the PFWA All-Rookie Team. He was named the Polynesian Pro Football Player of the Year for 2017.

The Steelers finished first in the AFC North with a 13–3 record and earned a first-round bye. On January 14, 2018, Smith-Schuster started in his first playoff game and made three receptions for five yards and a late touchdown in a narrow 45–42 loss to the Jacksonville Jaguars in the Divisional Round.

==== 2018 season ====
On January 18, 2018, the Steelers promoted quarterback's coach Randy Fichtner to offensive coordinator after they opted not to renew former offensive coordinator Todd Haley's contract. Smith-Schuster entered training camp slated as a starting wide receiver after the Steelers traded Martavis Bryant to the Oakland Raiders for a third-round pick in the 2018 NFL draft. Tomlin named Smith-Schuster a starting wide receiver to begin the regular season, alongside Antonio Brown.

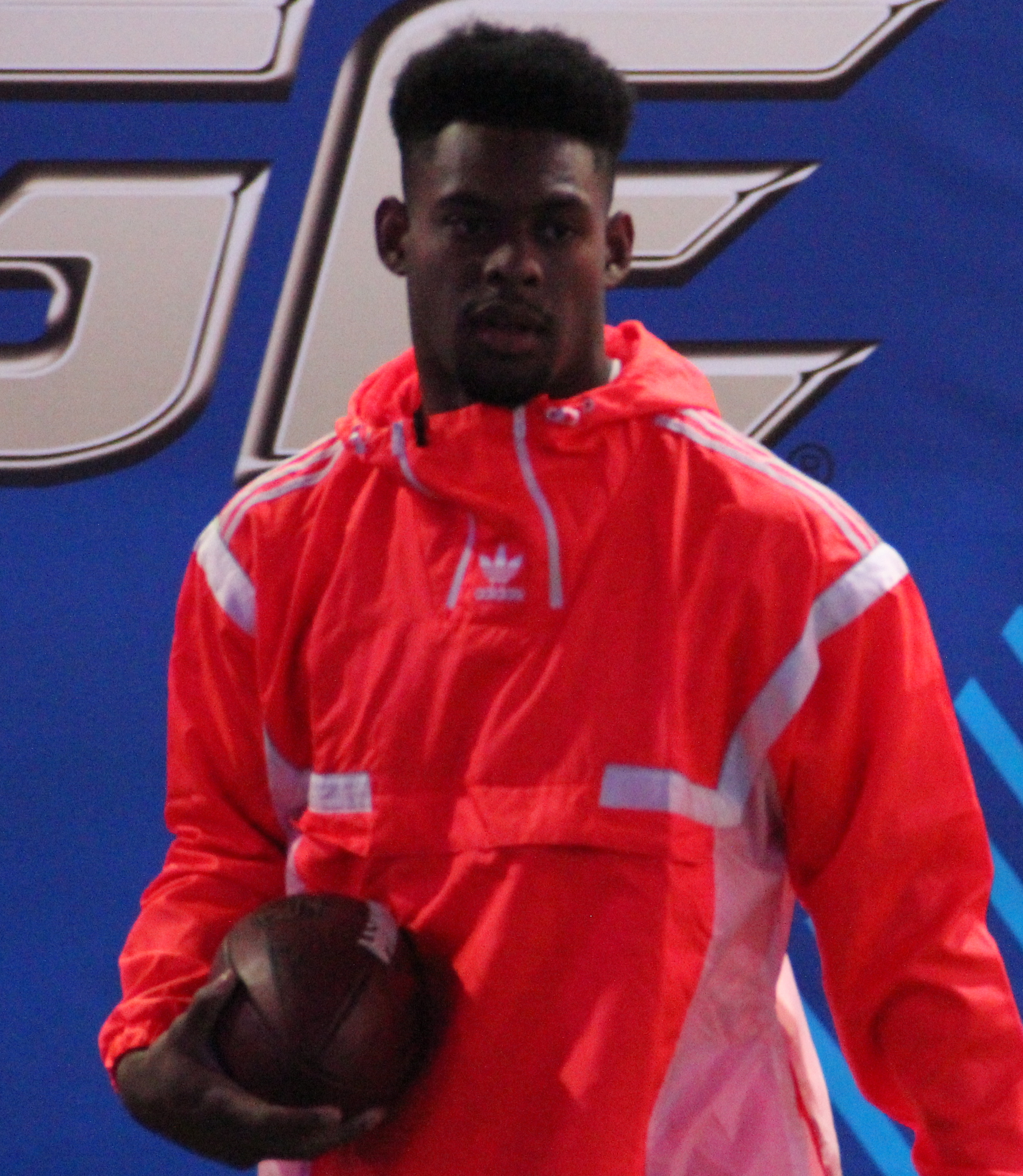
Smith-Schuster during the Pro Bowl in January 2019

Smith-Schuster started his second NFL season strong with nine receptions for 116 receiving yards in a 21–21 tie against the Browns. He followed that performance up with a career-high 13 receptions for 121 receiving yards and a touchdown in a 42–37 loss to the Kansas City Chiefs. In Week 3, against the Tampa Bay Buccaneers, he recorded nine receptions for 116 yards in the 30–27 victory. Smith-Schuster broke another NFL record on November 25, against the Denver Broncos when he became to the first player ever to have two offensive touchdowns of at least 97 yards. The touchdown was part of a 13-reception, 189-yard performance in the loss. In Week 14 against the Raiders, Smith-Schuster caught eight passes for 130 yards and two touchdowns in a 24–21 loss. During Week 16 against the New Orleans Saints, Smith-Schuster finished with 115 receiving yards as the Steelers lost 28–31; however, as the Steelers were progressing down the field into scoring position, Smith-Schuster committed a game-ending fumble. This would ultimately be one of the causes of the Steelers missing the playoffs that season, as wins by the Baltimore Ravens and Indianapolis Colts the following week officially eliminated them.

Smith-Schuster was voted team MVP by his teammates for the 2018 season, finishing the season with a team-high 111 receptions and 1,426 yards. He also had seven touchdowns on the season, finishing second on the team only to Antonio Brown's 15 touchdown catches. He finished fifth in the NFL in receiving yards. Smith-Schuster made his first career Pro Bowl in 2018 as an alternate, after Brown announced that he would not participate in the game because of an injury. He received an overall grade of 81.8 from Pro Football Focus in 2018, which ranked as the 16th highest grade among all qualifying wide receivers. He was ranked 47th by his fellow players on the NFL Top 100 Players of 2019.

==== 2019 season ====
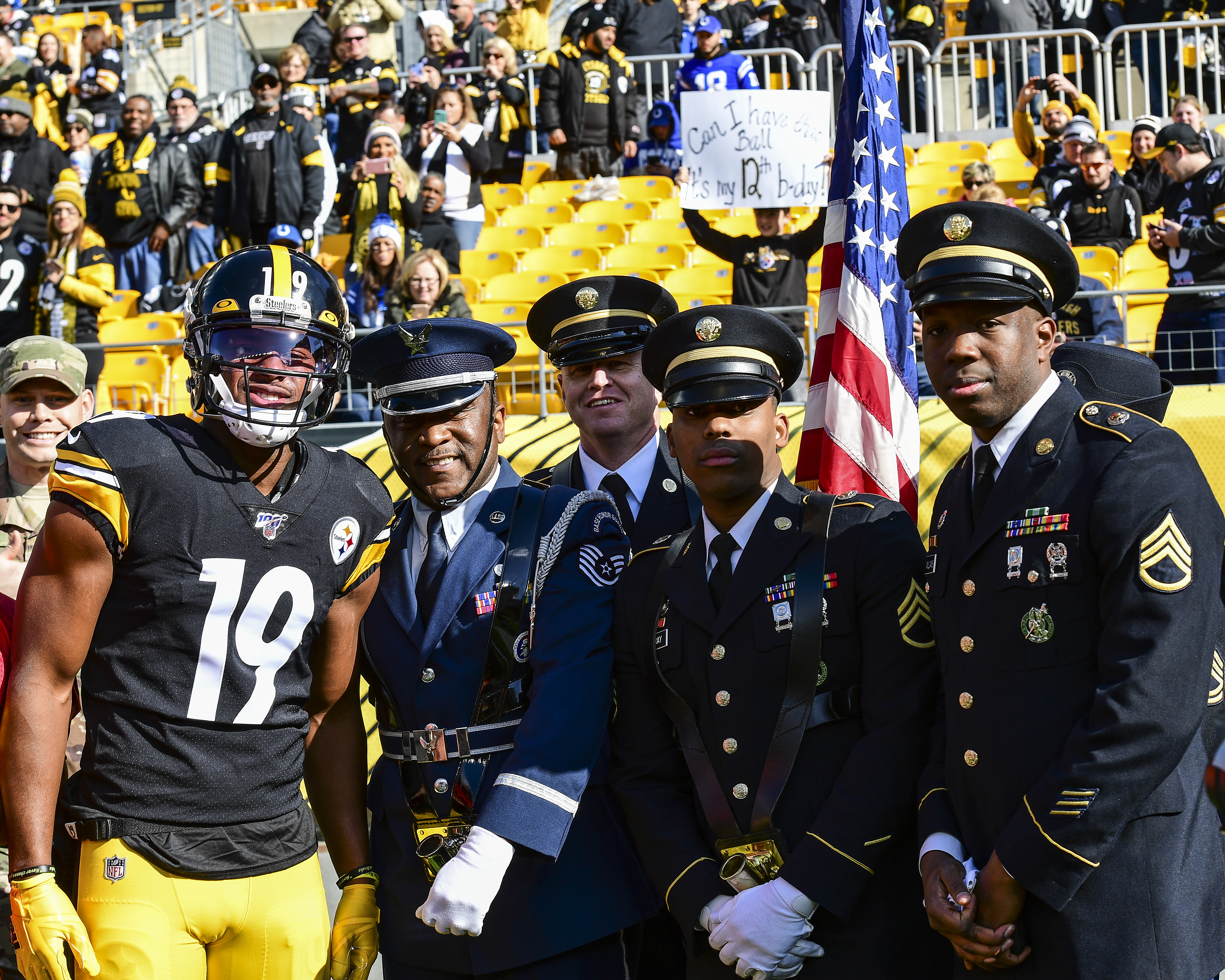
Smith-Schuster with members of the U.S. Air Force at Acrisure Stadium in December 2019

Prior to the start of the season, the Steelers traded Antonio Brown to the Raiders making Smith-Schuster the team's number one wide receiver. In Week 1 against the New England Patriots, Smith-Schuster caught six passes for 78 yards in the 33–3 loss. In Week 2 against the Seattle Seahawks, Smith-Schuster caught five passes for 84 yards as the Steelers lost 28–26.

In the game, Smith-Schuster passed Randy Moss as the youngest wide receiver to reach 2500 receiving yards (22 years, 297 days). In Week 3 against the San Francisco 49ers, Smith-Schuster caught three passes for 81 yards and a 76-yard touchdown pass as the Steelers lost 24–20. Smith-Schuster caught seven passes for 75 yards and a touchdown in Week 5 against the Ravens. However, after the game went into overtime, he fumbled after catching a pass as Ravens cornerback Marlon Humphrey punched the ball out of Smith-Schuster's arms. The fumble was costly as it allowed Baltimore to kick the game-winning field goal, sending the Steelers to a 26–23 overtime loss.

In Week 8 against the Miami Dolphins, Smith-Schuster caught five passes for 103 yards and a touchdown in the 27–14 win. This was Smith-Schuster's first 100-yard receiving game of the season. In Week 11 against the Browns, Smith-Schuster was knocked out after cornerback Greedy Williams delivered a helmet-to-helmet hit on him. Prior to the injury, Smith-Schuster caught two passes for 21 yards in the 21–7 loss. He missed all but the last two games of the season as he also suffered a knee injury from the Cleveland game. Smith-Schuster finished the 2019 season with a career-low 552 yards and three touchdowns on 42 catches.

==== 2020 season ====
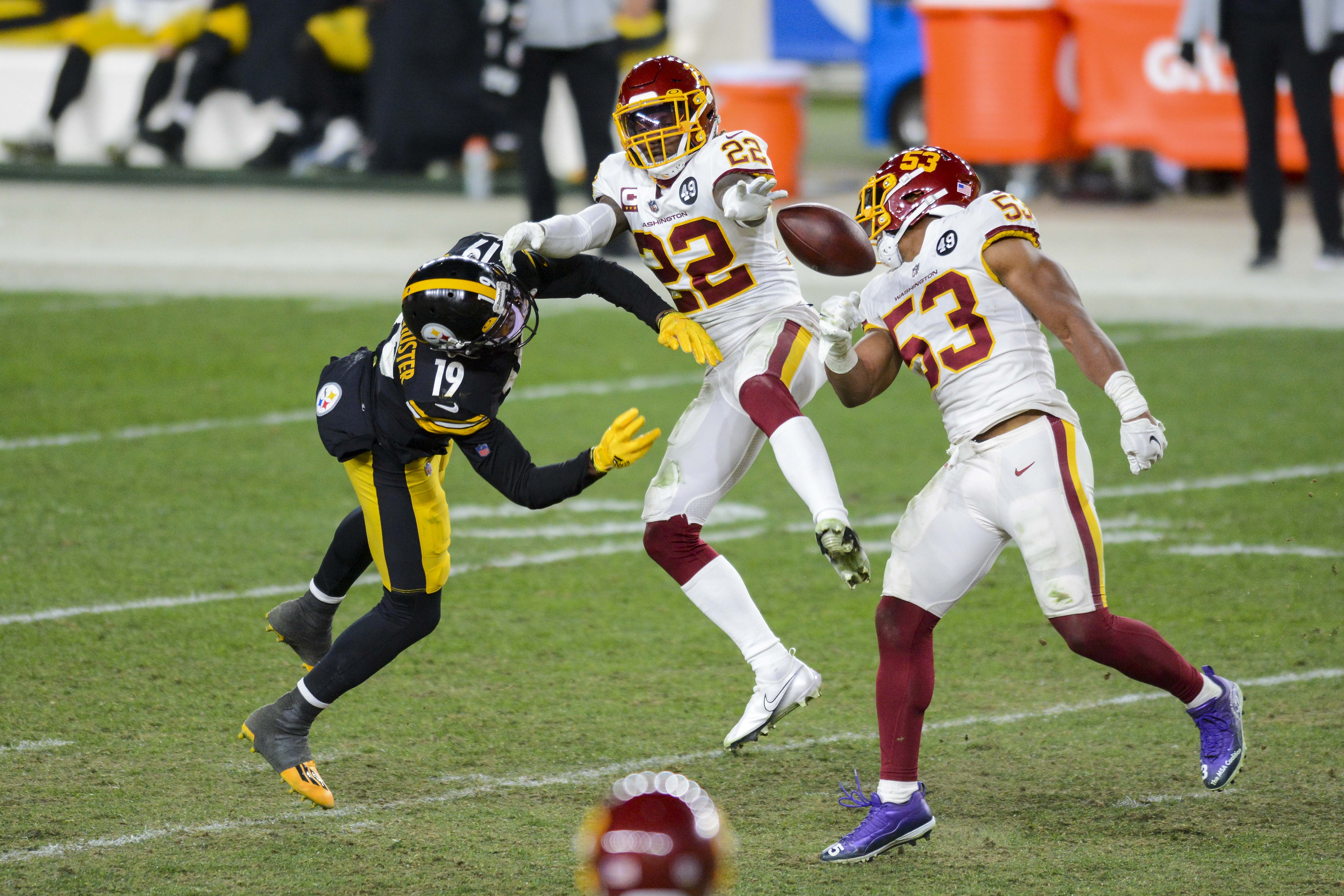
Smith-Schuster during a game against the Washington Football Team in December 2020

Smith-Schuster started the 2020 season off strong with six receptions for 69 receiving yards and two receiving touchdowns in the 26–16 victory over the New York Giants.

In Week 9 against the Cowboys at AT&T Stadium, Smith-Schuster recorded six catches for 93 yards and a touchdown during the 24–19 win. After Smith-Schuster caught the aforementioned touchdown, he attempted to celebrate on the star at midfield, but was stopped by various Cowboys defenders. In Week 16 against the Colts, Smith-Schuster recorded 9 catches for 96 yards, including the 25 yard game winning touchdown, during the 28–24 win.

Smith-Schuster was the subject of controversy after dancing on several other opponents' midfield logos for his TikTok followers prior to away games, including the Buffalo Bills and Bengals. Both teams took offense to Smith-Schuster's pre-game antics and used it as incentive to beat the Steelers, with Bengals safety Vonn Bell landing a vicious hit on Smith-Schuster and forcing a fumble during the Bengals' 27–17 victory in Week 15.

Overall, Smith-Schuster rebounded in his contract year with the Steelers, catching 97 passes for 831 yards and a career-high nine touchdowns operating mainly out of the slot.

Smith-Schuster was also involved in a controversy in a pre-game conference against the Browns. Before the game, Smith-Schuster noted that "the Browns is the Browns," and called them "nameless gray faces". In the Wild Card Round of the playoffs against the Browns, Smith-Schuster recorded 13 catches for 157 yards and a touchdown during the 48–37 loss.

==== 2021 season ====
On March 19, 2021, Smith-Schuster re-signed with the Steelers on a one-year, $8 million contract.

In August 2021, two weeks before the Steelers matchup against the Bills in Week 1, he was the subject of controversy after being filmed attempting the viral milk crate challenge, a challenge in which participants climb up and down a stack of milk crates. TikTok banned the challenge due to safety concerns such as serious injuries.

In Week 5, Smith-Schuster suffered a severe shoulder injury during a win over the Broncos and was placed on injured reserve on October 16. Three months later, days before the Steelers' Wild Card Round game against the Chiefs, a 21-day window for him was opened, and he was activated on January 15 for that matchup.

In the Wild Card Round of the playoffs, Smith-Schuster recorded five receptions for 26 yards, in the 42–21 loss against the Chiefs.

=== Kansas City Chiefs (first stint) ===
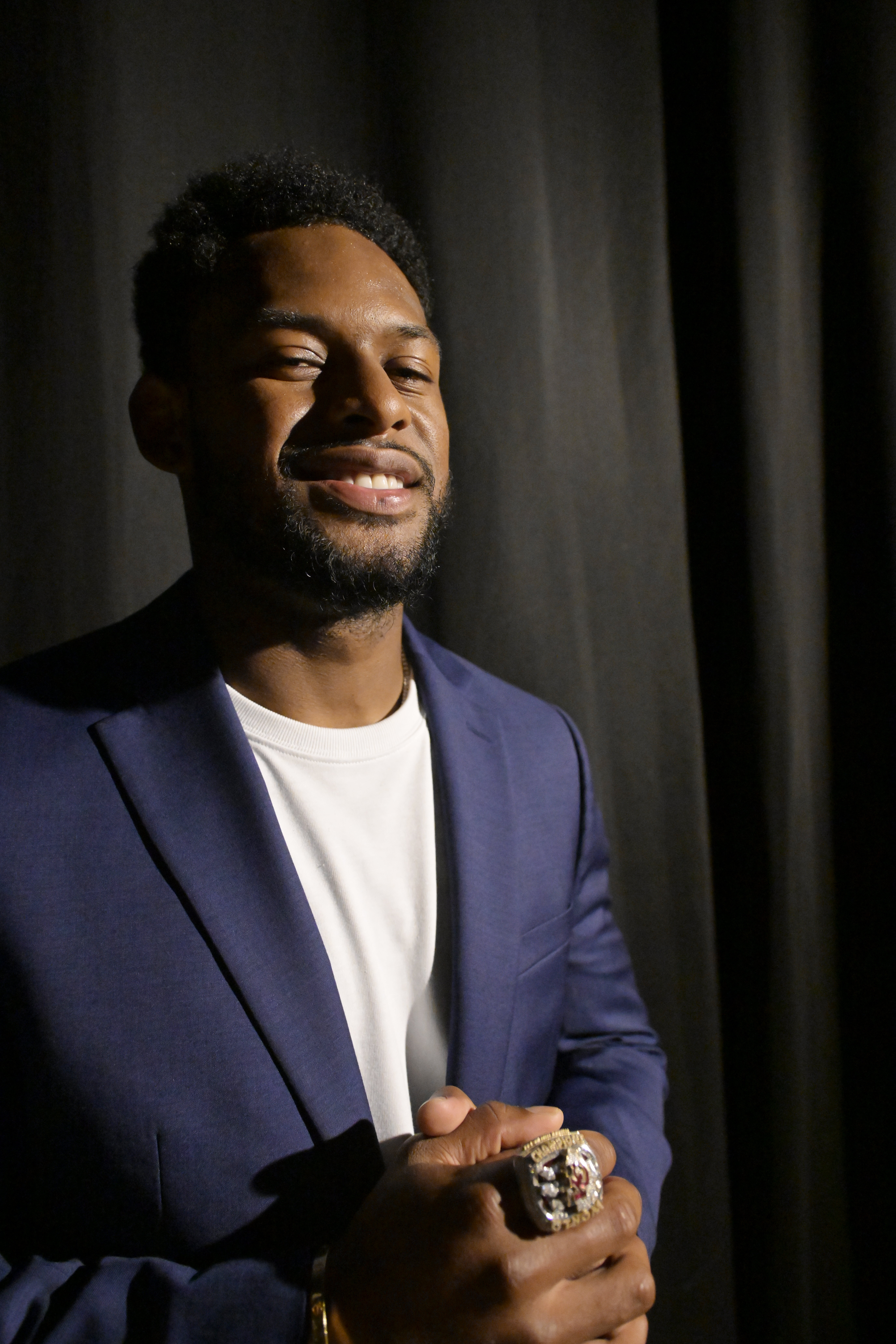
Smith-Schuster with his Super Bowl LVII ring

Smith-Schuster signed with the Chiefs on March 20, 2022. The contract was for one year worth a maximum of $10.75 million. He scored his first touchdown as a member of the Chiefs on October 16, 2022, in a 20–24 loss to the Bills. In the following game against the 49ers, he had seven receptions for 124 receiving yards and a touchdown in the 44–23 victory. He finished the 2022 season with 78 receptions for 933 receiving yards and three receiving touchdowns.

In the 38–35 victory against the Philadelphia Eagles in Super Bowl LVII, Smith-Schuster caught seven passes for 53 yards. With 1:54 remaining and the game tied 35–35, Smith-Schuster was involved in a pivotal play where he was held by Eagles cornerback James Bradberry on third down. The holding call resulted in a first down for the Chiefs, allowing them to run down the clock before scoring the game-winning field goal.

=== New England Patriots ===
On March 17, 2023, Smith-Schuster signed a three-year, $33 million contract with the Patriots. In his first season in New England, Smith-Schuster finished the season with 29 catches for 260 yards and one touchdown through 11 games and seven starts.

On August 9, 2024, the Patriots parted ways with Smith-Schuster after one season.

=== Kansas City Chiefs (second stint) ===
On August 26, 2024, the Chiefs signed Smith-Schuster to a one-year deal, reuniting him with the team he played for in 2022. Against the New Orleans Saints in Week 5, Smith-Schuster amassed the most receiving yards in his career since the 2020–21 playoffs, finishing with 130 yards and a touchdown on seven receptions as the Chiefs won 26–13. He finished the 2024 season with 18 receptions for 231 yards and two touchdowns. He had two receptions for 16 yards in the 40–22 loss to the Eagles in Super Bowl LIX.

On March 15, 2025, Smith-Schuster re-signed with the Chiefs on a one-year contract. Immediately following the Week 6 win over the Detroit Lions, Smith-Schuster attempted to shake hands with safety Brian Branch, who proceeded to punch Smith-Schuster in the face and subsequently began a brief brawl between the two teams. He finished the 2025 season with 33 receptions for 345 yards and one touchdown.

=== New York Giants ===
On June 2, 2026, Smith-Schuster signed with the New York Giants. Smith-Schuster reunited with Matt Nagy, his former offensive coordinator with the Kansas City Chiefs. He was released by the Giants following the signing of Najee Harris on August 18.

== Career statistics ==
Legend
	Won the Super Bowl
	Led the league
**Bold**	Career high

=== NFL ===
==== Regular season ====
Year	Team	Games		Receiving					Rushing					Returning					Fumbles	
Year	Team	GP	GS	Rec	Yds	Avg	Lng	TD	Att	Yds	Avg	Lng	TD	Ret	Yds	Avg	Lng	TD	Fum	Lost
2017	PIT	14	7	58	917	**15.8**	**97**	7	—	—	—	—	—	**9**	**240**	**26.7**	**96**	**1**	0	0
2018	PIT	16	13	**111**	**1,426**	12.8	**97**	7	1	**13**	**13.0**	**13**	0	—	—	—	—	—	1	1
2019	PIT	12	12	42	552	13.1	76	3	—	—	—	—	—	—	—	—	—	—	1	1
2020	PIT	16	14	97	831	8.6	31	**9**	—	—	—	—	—	—	—	—	—	—	**3**	1
2021	PIT	5	5	15	129	8.6	24	0	**3**	9	3.0	3	**1**	—	—	—	—	—	0	0
2022	KC	16	14	78	933	12.0	53	3	—	—	—	—	—	—	—	—	—	—	**3**	**2**
2023	NE	11	7	29	260	9.0	37	1	—	—	—	—	—	—	—	—	—	—	0	0
2024	KC	14	8	18	231	12.8	50	2	—	—	—	—	—	—	—	—	—	—	0	0
2025	KC	17	12	33	345	10.5	30	1	—	—	—	—	—	—	—	—	—	—	0	0
Career		121	92	481	5,624	11.7	97	33	4	22	5.5	13	1	9	240	26.7	96	1	8	5

==== Postseason ====
Year	Team	Games		Receiving					Returning					Fumbles	
Year	Team	GP	GS	Rec	Yds	Avg	Lng	TD	Ret	Yds	Avg	Lng	TD	Fum	Lost
2017	PIT	1	1	3	5	1.7	4	**1**	**1**	**23**	**23.0**	**23**	0	0	0
2020	PIT	1	1	**13**	**157**	12.1	**33**	**1**	—	—	—	—	—	0	0
2021	PIT	1	1	5	26	5.2	7	0	—	—	—	—	—	0	0
2022	KC	3	2	10	89	8.9	16	0	—	—	—	—	—	0	0
2024	KC	3	3	4	76	**19.0**	31	0	—	—	—	—	—	0	0
Career		9	8	35	353	10.1	33	2	1	23	23.0	23	0	0	0

=== College ===
Season	Team	Games		Receiving				Rushing				Kickoff return				Defense		
Season	Team	GP	GS	Rec	Yds	Avg	TD	Att	Yds	Avg	TD	Ret	Yds	Avg	TD	Solo	Ast	Cmb
2014	USC	13	13	54	724	13.4	5	2	3	1.5	0	**11**	**132**	12.0	0	**4**	**1**	**5**
2015	USC	14	14	**89**	**1,454**	**16.3**	**10**	1	4	4.0	0	4	51	**12.8**	0	1	0	1
2016	USC	13	13	70	914	13.1	**10**	**5**	**27**	**5.4**	0	1	2	2.0	0	2	0	2
Career		40	40	213	3,092	14.5	25	8	34	4.3	0	16	185	11.6	0	7	1	8

== Career highlights ==
=== Awards and honors ===
NFL

- Super Bowl champion (LVII)
- Pro Bowl (2018)
- PFWA All-Rookie Team (2017)
- 2× Polynesian Professional Football Player of the Year (2017, 2018)
- Ranked No. 47 in the Top 100 Players of 2019

College

- Second-team All-American (2015)
- First-team All-Pac-12 (2015)
- 2× Second-team All-Pac-12 (2014, 2016)

=== Records ===
==== NFL records ====
- First player in NFL history to score five touchdowns before his 21st birthday
- Youngest player to record at least 150 receiving yards in a single game
- Youngest player to reach 1,500 receiving yards
- Youngest rookie wide receiver to score a TD since AFL–NFL merger

==== Steelers franchise records ====
- Longest touchdown reception in franchise history (97 yards)
- Fewest games needed to reach 1,500 career receiving yards (21)

== Personal life ==
Smith-Schuster is of African-American and Samoan descent and was raised in Long Beach, California. He is the second-eldest of seven children and is a Christian. His cousin, Johnny Nansen, was formerly an assistant coach at USC. Smith-Schuster's nickname "JuJu" came from his aunt when he was a few months old. She initially called him "John-John" before opting to call him "JuJu" instead. He has one biological sister named So'omalo and their father was not active in their lives. His stepfather, Lawrence Schuster, was introduced to his mother, Sammy (Toa) when Smith-Schuster was four years old. Smith-Schuster legally hyphenated his last name after he turned 18, adding Schuster in honor of his stepfather. Smith-Schuster states he grew up a fan of USC and looked up to wide receivers Marqise Lee, Robert Woods, and Nelson Agholor.

== Digital media ==
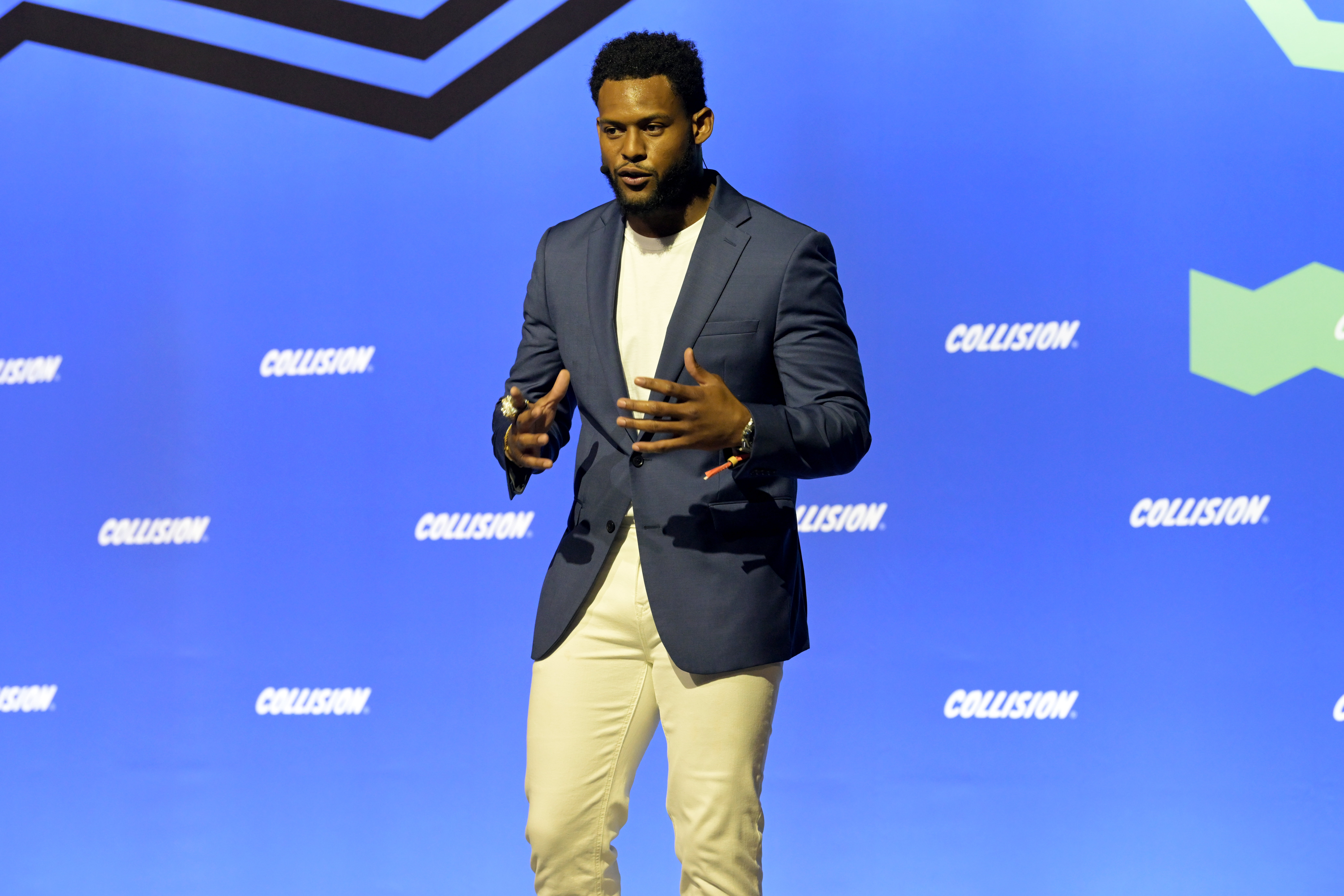
Smith-Schuster in 2023

Smith-Schuster has built a widely viewed presence on many social media, including TikTok, YouTube, Twitter, and Twitch.

Smith-Schuster has used Twitch to stream himself playing games including Fortnite and Call of Duty: WWII. In 2018 he participated in Ninja's record-breaking Fortnite stream including Drake and Travis Scott. While injured during the 2019 season, Smith-Schuster participated in a live Thursday Night Football stream with TimTheTatman, for which he was paid $100,000.

In February 2018, Smith-Schuster announced a partnership with the popular gaming group FaZe Clan to sell merchandise. He now has a YouTube channel using his full name that posts Call of Duty, Fortnite Battle Royale, and daily life videos that often feature his French Bulldog Boujee.

In October 2020, Smith-Schuster announced that he would own a new esports team called Team Diverge. The team intends to include content from other athletes and musicians and would establish its own gaming house after the 2020 NFL season ended.
