= Cath Bowie =

Scottish gamer and live streamer (born 1948)

- Born: 1 September 1948 (age 78); Moray, Scotland
- Occupations: Gamer; live streamer
- Years active: 2017–present
- Known for: Oldest female Fortnite player

Twitch information
- Channel: grumpygran1948
- Years active: 2017–present
- Genre: Gaming
- Game: Fortnite
- Followers: 25 thousand
- Last updated: 26 September 2026

Cath Bowie (born 1 September 1948), known professionally as "grumpygran1948", is a Scottish gamer and live streamer known for playing the video game Fortnite. In September 2026, she got a world record from Guinness World Records for being the oldest female Fortnite player.

== Early life ==
Cath Bowie was born on 1 September 1948 in Moray, Scotland.

== Career ==
Bowie was first introduced to Fortnite in 2017 when she saw her grandson, Lewis, playing the game on his PlayStation 4. She said in an interview that she was "immediately hooked" upon seeing and playing it. After buying a console, she started streaming under the username grumpygran1948 on Twitch shortly after, reaching a viewership of over 24,000 followers. Her grandson said that he thought she wouldn't amass much of a following.

Despite being an avid player of Fortnite, she has tried other games such as Mario Kart, FIFA, and Minecraft. In 2024, she played Fortnite with YouTuber SypherPK, which racked up half a million views. In October 2024, she was appointed the face of IKEA's gaming range in promotion for its Brannboll collection. In September 2026, she was awarded a world record for being the oldest female Fortnite player; she will be featured in the Guinness World Records Gamer's Edition 2027.

== Personal life ==
As of 2025, Bowie is married to her husband and lives in Inverurie, Scotland.
