= List of most-followed Twitch channels =

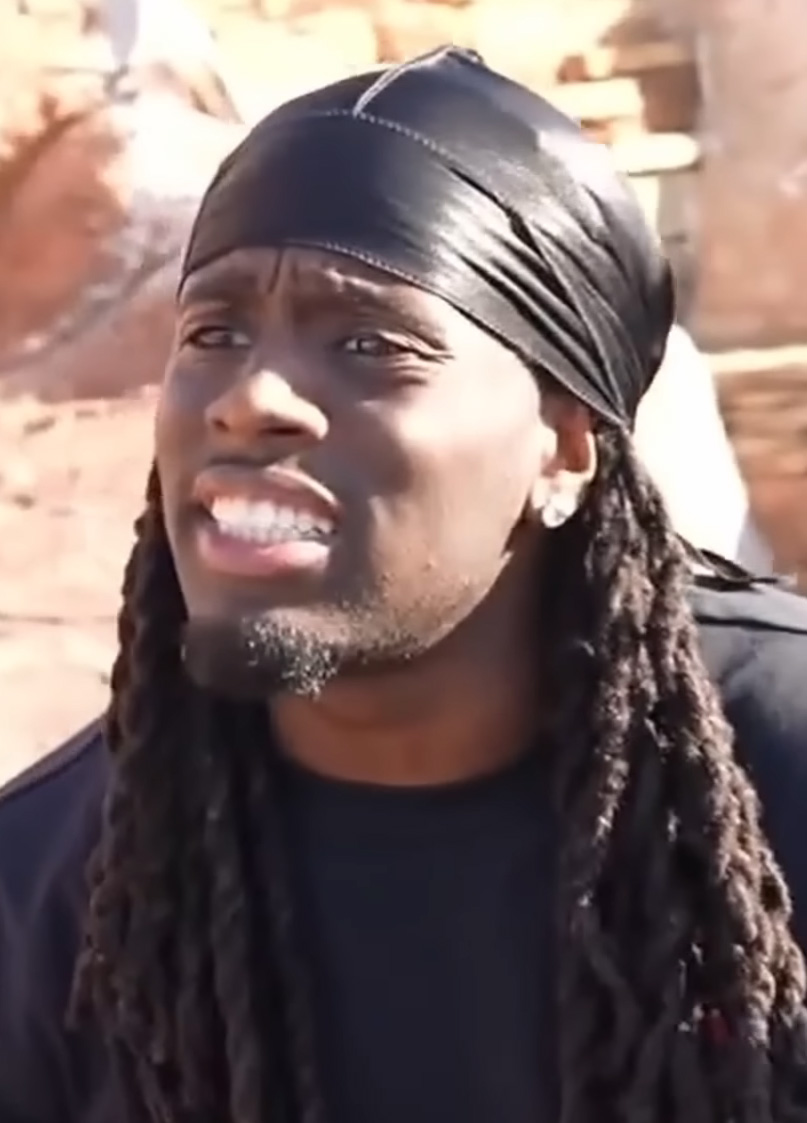
Kai Cenat is the most-followed channel on Twitch, and the first to reach 20 million followers.

The live streaming social platform Twitch launched in 2011 and is an important platform for digital entertainment. The distribution of followers across all of the streamers on Twitch follows the power law, and is a useful metric for assessing the popularity a streamer has on the platform. As of September 2025, the most-followed channel belongs to Kai Cenat with 20 million followers. The most followed female streamer is Pokimane, with 9.4 million followers.

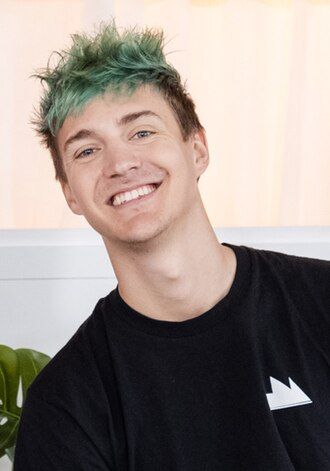
Ninja was the first channel to reach 10 million followers, and is currently third-most-followed overall.

The countries with the most Twitch users as of 2022 were the United States (93 million), Brazil (16.9 million), Germany (16.8 million), France (15.4 million), the United Kingdom (13.4 million), Russia (10.5 million), Spain (10.5 million), Argentina (10 million), Mexico (9.2 million), and Italy (8.3 million users). The United States accounts for roughly 36% of all Twitch users.

== List ==
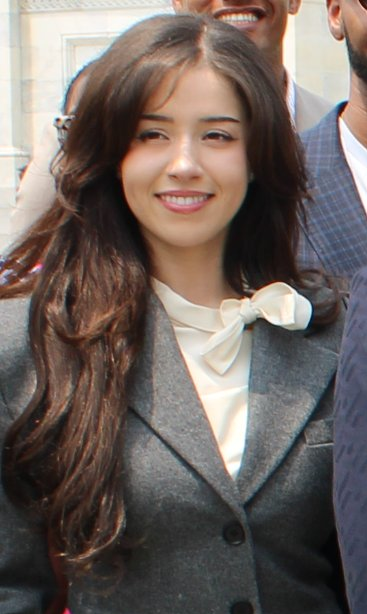
Pokimane is the most-followed female-led channel on Twitch.

The following table lists the 50 most-followed channels on Twitch as of August 2, 2026, with the primary category or categories in which they stream, highlighting the diversity of gaming, music, and creative content on the platform.

† indicates a channel is no longer active on the platform.

Rank	Channel	Owner	Total followers (millions)	Streamed categories	Language	Nationality
1	KaiCenat	Kai Cenat	21.4	Special events, various games, chatting	English	United States
2	Ibai	Ibai Llanos	20.4	Special events, various games, chatting	Spanish	Spain
3	Ninja	Tyler Blevins	19.3	Fortnite, Marvel Rivals	English	United States
4	Auronplay	Raúl Álvarez	17	Minecraft, Grand Theft Auto V, various games, chatting	Spanish	Spain
5	Rubius	Rubén Doblas	16.5	Minecraft, Fortnite, various games, chatting	Spanish	Spain, Norway
6	xQc	Félix Lengyel	12.5	Various games, Overwatch, chatting	English	Canada
7	EasyLiker	Shayne (Шейн)	12.3	Various games, chatting	Russian	Russia
8	TheGrefg	David Cánovas	12.3	Fortnite, Minecraft, various games, chatting	Spanish	Spain
9	Juansguarnizo	Juan Sebastián Guarnizo	11.7	Minecraft, Grand Theft Auto V, various games, chatting	Spanish	Colombia
10	Tfue	Turner Tenney	11.5	Apex Legends, Fortnite	English	United States
11	Shroud	Michael Grzesiek	11.3	Valorant, various games	English	Canada
12	Jynxzi	Nicholas Stewart	11.2	Clash Royale, Tom Clancy's Rainbow Six Siege	English	United States
13	ElMariana	Osvaldo Palacios	11.1	Minecraft, various games, chatting	Spanish	Mexico
14	Edu90	Eduardo Martín	10.8	Counter-Strike: Global Offensive	Spanish, English, German	
15	ElSpreen	Iván Buhajeruk	9.7	Minecraft, various games, chatting	Spanish	Argentina
16	Pokimane	Imane Anys	9.5	Valorant, various games, chatting	English	Canada, Morocco
17	Sodapoppin	Thomas Morris	9	World of Warcraft, League of Legends, various games	English	United States
18	caseoh_	Case Baker	9	Various games, chatting	English	United States
19	Clix	Cody Conrod	8.6	Fortnite, Grand Theft Auto V	English	United States
20	Alanzoka	Alan Ferreira	8.1	Rocket League, Various games	Portuguese	Brazil
21	TimTheTatman	Timothy Betar	7.6	Call of Duty: Warzone, various games	English	United States
22	Riot Games	Riot Games	7.4	League of Legends	English	United States
23	Myth	Ali Kabbani	7.3	Valorant, various games	English	United States
24	Tommyinnit	Thomas Simons	7.2	Minecraft, chatting	English	UK
25	SypherPK	Ali Hassan	7.2	Fortnite	English	United States, Jordan
26	Coringa	Victor Augusto	7.2	Free Fire, various games, chatting	Portuguese	Brazil
27	Mongraal	Kyle Jackson	7.2	Fortnite, Valorant	English	UK
28	AriGameplays	Abril Garza	7.2	Valorant, Minecraft, various games, chatting	Spanish	Mexico
29	Rivers_gg	Samantha Rivera Treviño	7	Various games	Spanish	Mexico
30	AdinRoss	Adin Ross	7	Various games, chatting	English	United States
31	ESLCS	ESL	6.8	Counter-Strike 2	English	Germany
32	NICKMERCS	Nicholas Kolcheff	6.8	Apex Legends, Fortnite	English	United States
33	Quackity	Alexis	6.6	Minecraft, chatting	English	Mexico
34	Summit1g	Jaryd Lazar	6.4	Counter-Strike 2, various games	English	United States
35	Fortnite	Epic Games	6.4	Fortnite	English	United States
36	AMOURANTH	Kaitlyn Siragusa	6.1	ASMR, chatting	English	United States
37	Dream	Clay	6	Minecraft	English	United States
38	Moistcr1tikal	Charles White Jr.	6	Various games, chatting	English	United States
39	Its_j0schi	Aljoscha	6			
40	Robleis	Tomás Arbillaga	5.9	Various games, chatting	Spanish	Argentina
41	Squeezie	Lucas Hauchard	5.9	Special events, various games, chatting	French	France
42	NickEh30	Nicholas Amyoony	5.8	Fortnite	English	Canada
43	MontanaBlack88	Marcel Eris	5.8	FIFA, chatting	German	Germany
44	Elded	Victor Calderón	5.7	Various games	Spanish	Mexico
45	Loltyler1	Tyler Steinkamp	5.5	League of Legends	English	United States
46	Bugha	Kyle Giersdorf	5.5	Fortnite	English	United States
47	IShowSpeed	Darren Watkins Jr.	5.4	Chatting	English	United States
48	Tubbo	Tobias Smith	5.2	Minecraft, chatting	English	UK
49	Buster		5.2	Various games, chatting	Russian	
50	stableronaldo	Rani Netz	5.2	Various games, chatting	English	United States

== See also ==
- List of most-subscribed Twitch channels
- List of most-followed Facebook pages
- List of most-followed Instagram accounts
- List of most-followed TikTok accounts
- List of most-followed X accounts
- List of most-subscribed YouTube channels
