= Iconoclasts (video game) =

2018 platform video game

- Developer: Konjak
- Publisher: Bifrost Entertainment
- Designer: Joakim Sandberg
- Composer: Joakim Sandberg
- Platforms: Linux; macOS; PlayStation 4; PlayStation Vita; Windows; Nintendo Switch; Xbox One
- Release: Linux, macOS, PS4, Vita, Windows; January 23, 2018; Switch; August 2, 2018; Xbox One; January 23, 2020
- Genre: Platform
- Mode: Single-player

Iconoclasts is a platform game by Swedish developer Joakim "Konjak" Sandberg and published by Bifrost Entertainment. The game was released for Linux, macOS, PlayStation 4, PlayStation Vita and Windows in January 2018, for Nintendo Switch in August 2018, and for Xbox One in January 2020.

== Gameplay ==
Iconoclasts is a 2D platformer with metroidvania elements. Gameplay involves a mixture of exploring, fighting enemies, and solving environmental puzzles using Robin's tools. The game has a plot that plays out as the player completes levels. The game places a lot of emphasis on boss battles, and there are well over twenty different bosses in the game.

Robin gains several tools over the course of the game, each with both combat and puzzle-solving functions. The wrench is a melee weapon that is also used to turn bolts, grapple, and, later, electrify Robin or other tools and objects. The stun-gun can fire single shots and charge shots, and can destroy some obstacles. The roller bomb shot fires projectile timed explosives or charged missile shots, can destroy some obstacles, and can be electrified. The usurper shot fires piercing beams and a charge shot that causes Robin to exchange places with certain objects and enemies it hits.

The characters Mina, Royal, and Elro join Robin's party at certain times throughout the game; they may assist in boss fights or become controllable by the player.

By finding materials in treasure chests, Robin can craft Tweaks, which provide small gameplay bonuses such as increased melee damage, faster running speed, or unique abilities. Tweaks can only be equipped at save points; one Tweak becomes broken whenever Robin takes damage, and each Tweak must be repaired by refilling a gauge before becoming active again.

== Plot ==
=== Setting ===
The main character is Robin, a naive and helpful mechanic. She is part of the population of humans living on an earth-like planet where the sinister religious authority the One Concern, ruled by a being known as "Mother", has taken over the government, and allows only licensed mechanics to handle the power source called "Ivory" that drives its machines. Due to her attempts to help people in need despite being a self-taught mechanic, the soldiers of the One Concern track down Robin and label her a criminal and a heretic, which forces her to escape along with her allies and fight back against the One Concern.

Ivory, a white liquid said to exist in all matter on the planet, is venerated by the One Concern as a holy substance. In addition to powering machines, it can grant supernatural abilities to select few humans through fusion with their blood. Those who survive but become mutilated in the process become Agents, legal enforcers possessing extraordinary strength, long lifespans, and a range of superpowers; those who flawlessly survive the process, such as Mother and her successor Royal, are extolled as Mediums, destined leaders of the human race, possessing telekinetic power over all matter containing Ivory.

A conflicting religion is practiced by the Isi, a people who live underwater thanks to excavated technology, powered by harvesting Ivory from the ocean floor through different means than those of the surface dwellers. The One Concern engages in armed conflict against the Isi, labeling them "pirates."

During the course of the game, it is revealed that Ivory supplies are dwindling due to exploitation by both the One Concern and the Isi; not only has research into replacement power sources failed or been regarded as a regression, but the planet's structure has also destabilized due to deprivation of Ivory, causing intermittent earthquakes believed to indicate the impending death of the planet.

=== Synopsis ===
Robin is an unregistered mechanic in her community, following in her father's footsteps despite the threat of the One Concern; her brother Elro is a Concern chemist secretly carrying out subversive research while raising his family. One day, Concern agents Black and White surprise Robin while she is repairing Elro's house. As punishment, the house is destroyed, killing his family, and Robin is thrown in prison where she befriends and escapes with Mina, a member of the Isi. On the run, Robin encounters Royal, the heir to Mother, leader of the concern. Royal helps Robin evade General Chrome, chief of the Concern military, and Mina takes them both to the hidden settlement Isilugar. They fend off a Concern attack, killing agent White in the process, and Black retreats after taking Mina's partner Samba captive.

The search for Samba brings Robin, Elro, and Mina to a secret Concern structure where children are being brainwashed to form the foundation of a new, cult-like society. Although they rescue Samba, Agent Black rips Elro's arm off over an old wrong and prepares to kill him, but General Chrome intervenes and has him sent to a Concern hospital, much to Black's dismay. In the chaos, Robin is thrown into an underground facility, where she is reunited with Royal. They accidentally activate and defeat a massive alien machine, but it transmits a signal up into the sky as it is destroyed.

Royal offers to help Robin infiltrate the One Concern's headquarters to rescue Elro, but to his dismay finds himself condemned for the signal transmission- he has accidentally summoned the Starworm, a spacefaring entity the Concern worships as a god, to destroy the planet. The Concern activates an emergency plan to evacuate its leadership to one of the moons on a rocket. General Chrome, learning of this, decides the Concern has lost its way and starts an insurrection. After rescuing Elro, Royal seeks an audience with Mother, who rejects and attacks him, forcing Robin to kill her. As the One Concern collapses into civil war, Chrome corners the group and prepares to execute them to clear the field for his new regime, but is himself killed by Elro.

Royal convinces everyone to help him hijack the escape rocket and confront the Starworm himself on the moon. Agent Black resolves to stop them, but is killed after transforming into a monstrous creature. Upon arriving at the moon base with Robin, Royal gets the Starworm's attention, but it ignores his entreaties until he goes too far and damages it with his powers, provoking it into breaching the base's hull. Royal sinks into despair and Robin is forced to leave him behind and return home in an escape capsule.

The Starworm burrows into the planet and everyone tries to make their peace with the seemingly imminent end of the world. Robin, optionally accompanied by Mina depending on dialog choices, goes to its landing site and exploits the damage Royal did to incapacitate it. The "Starworm" is revealed to be a vehicle piloted by a large birdlike alien, who had expected to drain the planet of its ivory to refuel, which stands in stark contrast to the veneration by the human society of Ivory and the Starworm. After the alien is defeated, Robin causes its vehicle to rupture and discharge a vast amount of ivory, rejuvenating the ecosystem. Robin returns home and takes a well-deserved nap.

In the end credits scene we see what happens to some of the other people of the planet: doctor Gustavo and Teegan start studying their new surroundings post-crisis situation, the ChemiCo Contra rediscover a way to use electricity, Tolo mourns General Chrome's death as the rest of the soldiers recognize him as his new leader, Mina and Samba reunite and share a kiss, Mendeleev furiously cries as Nobel accompanies her and Ash looks at them in the distance before disappearing just as Nobel turns around, Emmet Darland lies in the peak of a snowy mountain alone and lost, his position of power and place in the world now gone, people of the Bastion suffer the consequences of Chrome's insurrection, the isolated members of the tower struggle to find a new purpose in life and Samba and Mina look forward into the new future their friend has given to them.

== Development ==
Iconoclasts was in development since 2010, totalling 8 years of development before its 2018 release. It was initially called Ivory Springs, then The Iconoclasts. The existence of the game was revealed in 2011. In 2015, it was announced that it would be released for PlayStation 4 and PlayStation Vita with the assistance of Norwegian publisher and investor, Bifrost Entertainment AS. In 2017, the game's release date was announced as January 23, 2018. The game would release for Nintendo Switch on August 2, 2018, and for Xbox One on January 23, 2020. A version for Amazon Luna was made available on October 20, 2020. The game uses Construct Classic as its engine.

A demo has been released on the game's official website.

The soundtrack composed by Joakim Sandberg was released February 1, 2018.

== Reception ==
Graham Smith of Rock, Paper, Shotgun called the action in the game's demo "spectacular and tactical". Andy Chalk of PC Gamer called the previews of the game "impressive". Upon release, Iconoclasts received "generally favorable" reviews on Metacritic with a score of 86 on PC and 83 on PlayStation 4. the game was well received for its visuals, characters, story and subject matter while it also got criticism regarding the combat and linearity. The game was nominated for "Fan Favorite Indie Game" at the Gamers' Choice Awards.
