= Temple fade =

Hairstyle with short sides and a long top

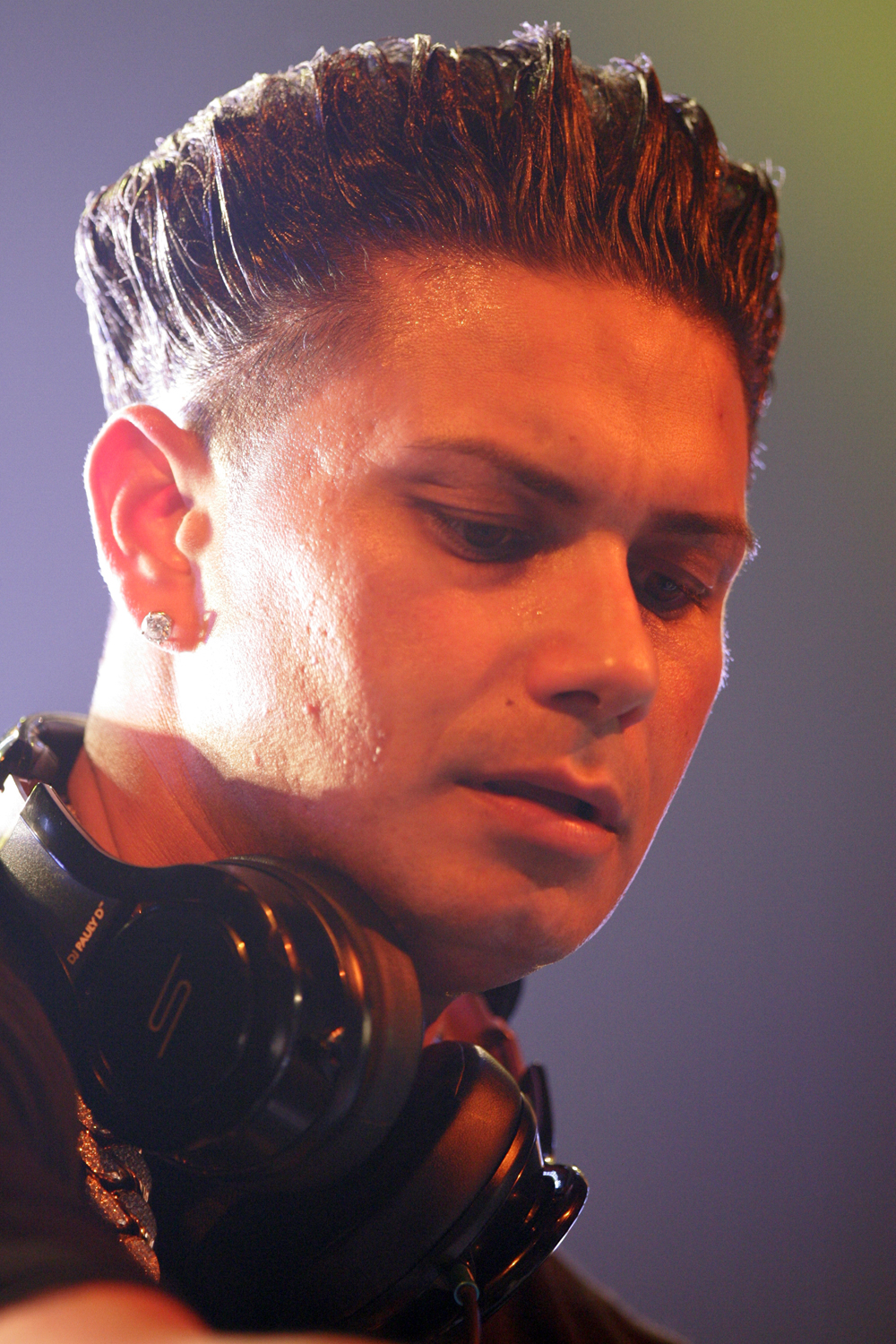
The temple fade haircut has short sides and a long top. One of the most well known people with this hairstyle is DJ Pauly D.

The temple fade, also known as a Brooklyn fade, taper fade, and blowout, is a haircut that first gained popularity in the late 90s and early 2000s as a variation of the bald fade.

== Overview ==
The hair is tapered from the scalp to 1 cm (0.4 in) in length from the edge of the hairline up 2 cm (0.8 in). The rest of the hair is left the same length, usually 2–5 cm (0.8–2.0 in), depending on the preference of the client.

In 2024, the haircut became part of a meme after musician Ericdoa had a YouTube livestream singing impromptu songs, including one where he sang "Imagine if Ninja got a low taper fade"; the segment was recognized for the absurdity of its lyrics, especially contrasting the preceding song about how the death of Ericdoa's own grandfather affected him. The low taper fade clip subsequently went viral, culminating in Ninja revealing in a TikTok video that he got the haircut. He has since made references to the meme during videos and streams.

== Different types of taper fades ==
- Low taper fade – Shaved sideburns and faded around
- Mid taper fade – Starting the taper at the temple area, offering a gradual transition from longer hair at the top to shorter at the sides
- High taper fade – Larger fade area, beginning tapering near the crown or higher
- Ice pick taper fade – Starting the taper just below the ear and quickly fading back up to the ice pick sideburns lower down.

It is sometimes called the "low taper with ice picks" because the tapering starts at the same place as to where a low taper would start.

- Shadow taper fade – The fade is very subtle and leaves a slight shadow of hair on the sides and back.
- Blowout taper fade – An addition to a taper fade where bulk or weight is kept at the back.

== See also ==
- Hi-top fade
- List of hairstyles
- Rose Evansky
- Ninja
