= TimTheTatman =

American streamer (born 1990)

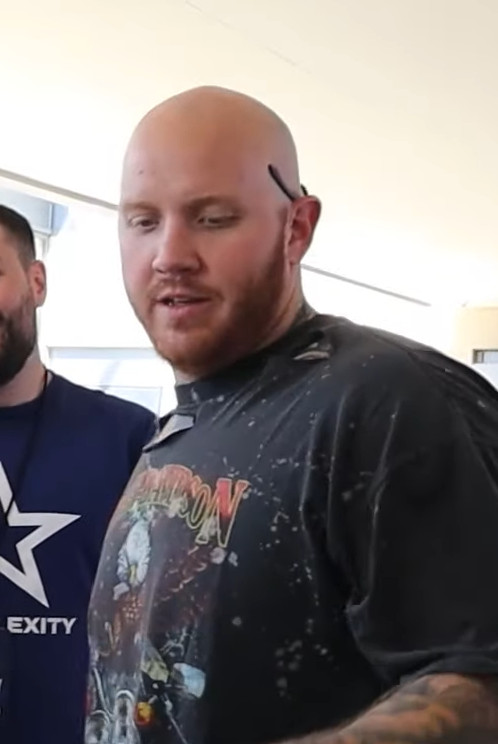
- TimTheTatman in 2021
- Born: Timothy John Betar; April 8, 1990 (age 36)

Twitch information
- Channel: TimTheTatman
- Years active: 2012–present
- Genre: Gaming
- Followers: 7 million

YouTube information
- Channel: TimTheTatman
- Years active: 2013–present
- Subscribers: 5.62 million
- Views: 1.54 billion
- Last updated: December 23, 2025
- Website: timthetatman.com

Timothy John Betar (born April 8, 1990), better known as TimTheTatman, is an American live streamer and YouTube personality.

== Career ==
Betar started streaming on Twitch in 2012 and has amassed over seven million followers since. Broadcasting games such as Counter-Strike: Global Offensive, Overwatch, Fortnite and World of Warcraft, the variety channel attracts thousands of viewers each day.

Betar is a Monster Energy esports athlete and is also sponsored by Audio-Technica He was a certified Twitch partner and has been a full-time creator since March 2014. After joining YouTube on January 23, 2011, the channel has grown to 3.2 million subscribers with videos viewed over 524 million times.

With the release of Epic Games's Fortnite in July 2017, Twitch stream viewership skyrocketed. The game streamed nearly 151 million hours during the first month of release. Streamers such as Betar, Tyler "Ninja" Blevins, and Turner "Tfue" Tenney, saw a steady increase in followers as the game grew in popularity.

During E3 2018, Epic Games held its first-ever Fortnite Celebrity Pro-Am, which paired up celebrities with professional gamers to raise money for charity. Betar teamed up with Mack Wilds for the event. Betar won the award for Fan Favorite Male Streamer/Gamer of the Year at the 2018 Gamers' Choice Awards.

In September 2021, Betar announced an exclusivity contract with YouTube. He signed with Complexity Gaming as a part-owner and content-creator that same month.

In May 2023, he made a request for the removal of his skin from the popular video game, Call of Duty: Modern Warfare II. This request was made in support of his friend, Nickmercs, who had his own skin removed by Activision after tweeting "They should leave little children alone. That's the real issue." in response to a brawl in California that stemmed from schools attempting to incorporate lessons on the LGBTQ+ community into the school curriculum.

On September 1, 2024, Betar returned to the Twitch live-streaming platform following the expiration of his exclusivity contract with YouTube. He now simulcasts his content across multiple platforms.

== Awards and nominations ==
Year	Ceremony	Category	Result	Ref.
2020	The Game Awards 2020	Content Creator of the Year	Nominated	
2025	The Streamer Awards	Best Marvel Rivals Streamer	Nominated	

== Philanthropy ==
In 2018, Betar teamed up with fellow streamers to raise money for St. Jude's Children's Research Hospital under the GuardianCon charity stream marathon. The event raised over $2.7 million for children's medical research. During his time block alone, Betar set the Twitch charitable donation record by raising more than $106,000 in 4 hours.

== Personal life ==
Betar was born on April 8, 1990. After meeting in high school, Betar and his wife Alexis were married in August 2016. The couple had a son, Brewer, on April 11, 2019. Betar is a native of Syracuse, New York, and is a fan of the Syracuse Orange.

== See also ==
- List of most-followed Twitch channels
