= Tfue =

American professional esports player (born 1998)

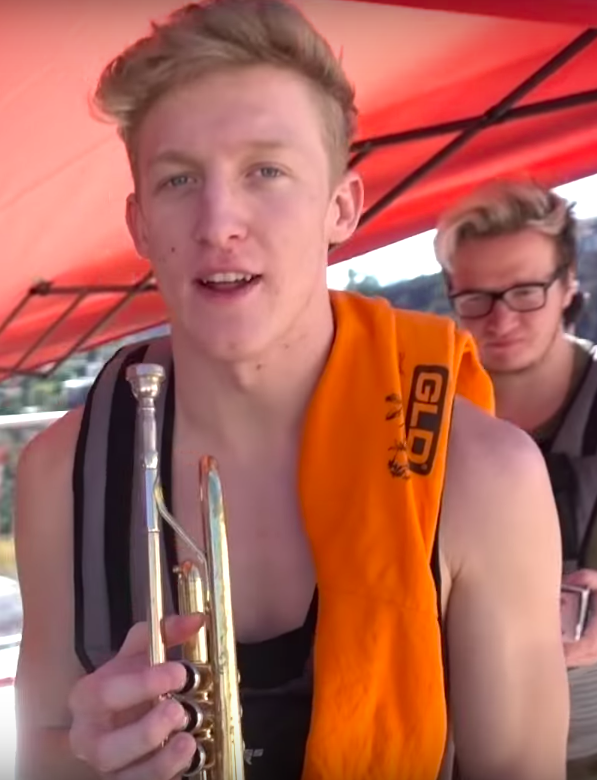
- Tenney in 2018
- Born: Turner Tenny Frahm; January 2, 1998 (age 28); Indian Rocks Beach, Florida, U.S.
- Occupations: Live streamer; YouTuber
- Organizations: FaZe Clan; Rogue; Denial Esports

Kick information
- Channel: Tfue
- Years active: 2023–present
- Followers: 229.1 thousand

Twitch information
- Channel: Tfue
- Years active: 2014–present
- Genres: Esports; Gaming
- Game: Fortnite Battle Royale • Call of Duty • ARC Raiders
- Followers: 11.5 million

YouTube information
- Channel: Tfue
- Years active: 2014–present
- Genres: Gaming; Vlog
- Subscribers: 11.8 million (April 7, 2026)
- Views: 1.7 billion (December 23, 2025)

Turner Tenney (born January 2, 1998), better known as Tfue, is an American online streamer, esports player, and YouTuber best known for playing Fortnite Battle Royale.

== Career ==
Tenney previously streamed games such as Call of Duty, Destiny and H1Z1, but he transitioned to Fortnite Battle Royale as it was quickly gaining popularity. Tfue later joined FaZe Clan, a professional esports organization.

In May 2018, Tenney was banned from Twitch for 30 days, after allegedly saying "coon" on one of his streams. Twitch later reduced the suspension to seven days.

On July 2, 2018, Tenney received a permanent account ban on his Epic Games accounts because he was allegedly selling and buying Epic Games accounts, which is prohibited by Epic Games' terms and conditions. A week later, Tenney was banned from Twitch again, this time for 14 days, for unknown reasons.

On May 20, 2019, Tenney filed a lawsuit against the FaZe Clan, claiming that they "pressured Tenney to live in one of their homes in Los Angeles, pressured him into underage drinking and illegal gambling. FaZe also continuously pressured and encouraged him to engage in dangerous stunts." Tenney also claimed, that "he only got 20% from any branded videos that are published on Twitch, YouTube or social media and half of his revenue from touring and appearances." FaZe Clan responded on Twitter, saying that they didn't take any money from his tournament winnings, Twitch and YouTube revenue or his social media. They also said that they "took $60,000 from his branded videos" and offered Tenney "an improved contract multiple times, with 100% of the money going to Tenney, but he rejected or ignored all of them."

On August 1, 2019, FaZe Clan filed a federal lawsuit in New York, suing Tenney, claiming that he violated his contract by disparaging the company and trying to form a rival esports organization. The organization also claims that Tenney allegedly directly leaked confidential information about his contract to media publications, violating their terms.

On June 20, 2023, after almost 2 months of internet absence, Tenney uploaded a video to YouTube announcing his retirement. On November 19, 2023, Tenney uploaded a video to YouTube announcing his return to streaming on the Kick platform.

On October 1, 2025, Tenney started his second channel SeaFueFishing and announced it from his primary channel.

On December 14, 2025, Tenney returned to Twitch after over a year away from the platform. He announced his return in a YouTube video titled 'I'm Back'. Since returning, Tenney has primarily livestreamed ARC Raiders. On January 12, 2026, Tenney was briefly banned from ARC Raiders. Initially for 30 days, his ban was lifted the following day.

== Personal life ==
Tenney is from Indian Rocks Beach, Florida. He went to middle school for a week, but Tenney left because "[...] it sucked [there] [...]" which is why "[...] [he] never really went to school [...]" after that and was homeschooled.

In 2019, he moved to New Jersey with his duo partner Cloakzy.

Tenney's older brother Jack is also a content creator under the moniker JOOGSQUAD PPJT, and has featured Turner in multiple YouTube videos.

In January 2026 Tenney purchased a waterfront property in St Pete Beach, Florida, that was the site of the Woody's Waterfront restaurant, which had been irreparably damaged in 2024 by hurricanes.

== See also ==
- List of most-followed Twitch channels
