= TobiWan =

Australian esports commentator

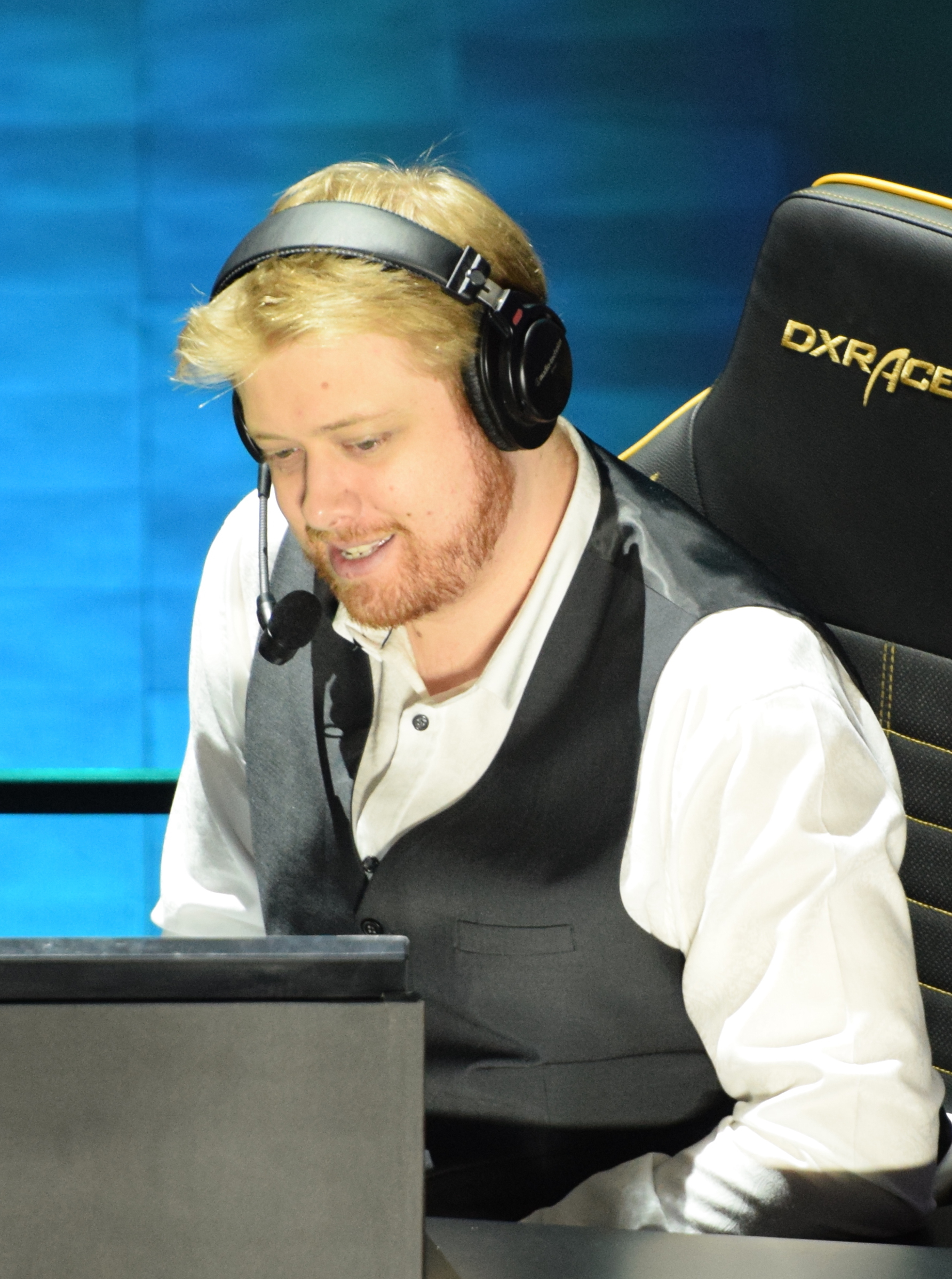
TobiWan in 2017

Toby "TobiWan" Dawson is an Australian former Dota 2 caster. Dawson was employed by the Electronic Sports League. He retired from esports casting following sexual assault allegations in 2020.

== Career ==
TobiWan was a competitive Call of Duty player during the Call of Duty: United Offensive era.

TobiWan began his casting career at the JoinDotA studio. The first Dota tournament he cast was World Cyber Games 2005 in Singapore, for which he was chosen even though he had only played a few games of Dota in his life. TobiWan was the announcer for The International 2011 final. Unlike most Dota casters, TobiWan was never a competitive Dota 2 gamer. TobiWan went on to cast most of the grand finals of major tournaments such as The International, The Defense, DreamHack, and JoinDotA Masters. In 2012 during a match, TobiWan made the following comment in chat: "have you heard the expression..lame as a niggers baby?"

TobiWan cast every iteration of The International through The International 2019. Tobiwan and Troels "Synderen" Nielsen commentated the grand finals of The International 2015 between Evil Geniuses and CDEC Gaming. Tobiwan, Soe, and Maelk commentated the 2015 MLG World Finals.

In 2015, he hosted the first Dota 2 Major, Frankfurt Major 2015. TobiWan appeared in the 2014 film Free to Play. He retired from esports casting following sexual assault allegations in 2020.
