= SypherPK =

American Twitch streamer and YouTuber (born 1996)

- Logo
- Born: Ali Hassan; May 10, 1996 (age 30)
- Occupations: Twitch streamer; YouTuber

Instagram information
- Page: Ali "SypherPK" Hassan
- Years active: 2013–present
- Followers: 2.8 million

TikTok information
- Page: sypherpk
- Years active: 2020–present
- Followers: 3.9 million

Twitch information
- Channel: SypherPK
- Years active: 2015–present
- Genre: Gaming
- Games: Fortnite; Call of Duty: Warzone; Among Us; Fall Guys
- Followers: 7.2 million

X information
- Handle: @SypherPK
- Display name: SypherPK
- Years active: 2011–present
- Followers: 1.8 million

YouTube information
- Channel: SypherPK
- Years active: 2011–present
- Subscribers: 10.6 million
- Views: 7.17 billion
- Last updated: July 1 2026

Ali Hassan (born May 10, 1996), better known online as SypherPK, is an American-Palestinian-Jordanian YouTuber and Twitch streamer known for his gaming streams and videos centering around the online video game Fortnite. As of February 3, 2025, he has the 22nd most followed channel on the Twitch platform, and 10.3 million subscribers on YouTube.

== Career ==
Hassan is of Palestinian-Jordanian descent. In 2015, SypherPK began gaming full-time. In November 2018, he failed to qualify in the "Fortnite Winter Royale" finals. In July 2020, SypherPK faced backlash after a TikTok user, JGshotTV, claimed he was unfairly banned from SypherPK’s chat. SypherPK denied any wrongdoing in a response to the situation on Twitter. In October 2020, he and fellow Twitch streamer KittyPlays partnered with online shopping service Klarna to launch a campaign titled "Playing For Keeps". In November 2020, he signed an exclusive streaming deal with the streaming platform Twitch. In February 2021, Fortnite unveiled its collaboration with SypherPK in the form of a locker bundle. In 2021, he created an apparel line known as Metal Umbrella. The p of this company was to create more than just 'influencer merch', and to "merge [Sypher's] love for anime and fashion". "Metal Umbrella is an expansion of the SypherPK brand". In June 2022, he partnered with Japanese automobile company Honda as part of an event titled "Hondaverse" in the game Fortnite. In September 2022, a purchasable outfit and cosmetic bundle in Fortnite were released with his likeness.

== Awards and nominations ==
Year	Ceremony	Category	Result	Ref.
2022	12th Streamy Awards	Branded Series	Nominated	
2023	The Game Awards	Content Creator of the Year	Nominated	
2023	Forbes 30 Under 30	Games	Included	
2023	The Streamer Awards	Best Battle Royale Streamer	Nominated	
