= Alanzoka =

Brazilian streamer (born 1990)

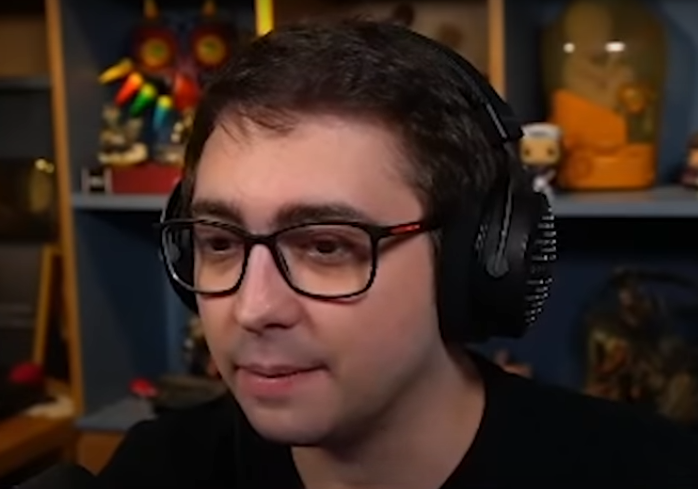
- Alanzoka in September 2021
- Born: Alan Ferreira Pereira; 13 May 1990 (age 36); São Paulo, Brazil
- Other name: Nextage
- Partner: Maethe Pauferro (2012–present)

Twitch information
- Channel: alanzoka
- Years active: 2011–present
- Genre: Gaming
- Games: Counter Strike: Global Offensive; Rocket League; Fortnite; Valorant
- Followers: 8 million

YouTube information
- Channels: alanzoka; Lives do alanzoka
- Years active: 2011–present
- Genre: Gaming
- Subscribers: 9.08 million (Main channel); 3.96 million (Lives do Alanzoka)
- Views: 2.45 billion (Main channel); 1.84 billion (Lives do Alanzoka)
- Last updated: 2 May 2026

Alan Ferreira Pereira (born 13 May 1990 in São Paulo), better known as Alanzoka, is a Brazilian streamer and YouTuber. He is considered one of the biggest Twitch streamers in Brazil.

== Career ==
Alanzoka was born on May 13, 1990 in São Paulo. He graduated in Gastronomy from Anhembi Morumbi University. Alanzoka established himself as a YouTuber in 2011 on his channel called “EDGE”, an acronym for Electronic Desire Gamers Entertainment. His first video was about Minecraft, but he used to shoot videos of horror games, mainly Amnesia and Dead Space 2, as well as co-op games. His channel's popularity was boosted in 2012 with videos about Slender. As of 2018, he renamed his channel to "alanzoka" and started his career on Twitch, recording videos of Five Nights at Freddy's and Fortnite. In 2016, he was part of the Brazilian Overwatch team. Alanzoka is also known for playing Rocket League and Valorant.

== Personal life ==
In 2026 Alanzoka had a son with his wife Maethe. In order to protect the couple's privacy, the pregnancy was kept secret.

== Legacy ==
Alanzoka is often recognized as one of the best-known Twitch streamers in Brazil. In 2018, he was named one of the most watched Brazilian streamers on the platform, and was one of the most watched when streaming Valorant and Cyberpunk 2077. He was included in the list "Five Brazilian streamers for you to keep an eye on Twitch", by The Clutch, and in the list "Streamers to watch during isolation by the coronavirus", by Globo Esporte.

As of October 2025, with over 7.8 million followers, Alanzoka was the 16th most followed streamer in the world on Twitch and 1st in Brazil. In 2019, he was one of the top earners on the platform.

== Awards and nominations ==
Award ceremony	Year	Category	Result	Ref.
MTV Millennial Awards	2019	Gamer of the year	Nominated	
MTV Millennial Awards	2020	Streamer BR	Won	
eSports Awards	2019	Streamer of the year	Nominated	
eSports Brasil Awards	2019	Best streamer of the year	Nominated	
eSports Brasil Awards	2019	Personality of the year	Nominated	
eSports Brasil Awards	2024	Personality of the year	Nominated	
Cubo de Ouro Awards	2021	Geek Streamer of the year	Nominated	
Digital Influencers Awards	2021	Games	Won	
Influency.me Awards	2021	Games	Nominated	
iBest Awards	2020	Gaming Content	Nominated	
iBest Awards	2021	Streaming Influencer	Nominated	
iBest Awards	2022	Gaming Influencer	Won	
iBest Awards	2022	Streaming Influencer	Nominated	
iBest Awards	2023	Gaming Influencer	Won	
iBest Awards	2023	Streaming Influencer	Nominated	
iBest Awards	2024	Gaming Influencer	Won	
iBest Awards	2024	Streaming Influencer	Nominated	
iBest Awards	2025	Gaming Influencer	Won	
iBest Awards	2025	Streaming Influencer	Nominated	
