= Gaming house =

Shared residence for video game players

A gaming house is a co-operative living arrangement where several players of video games, usually professional esports players, live in the same residence. Professional gaming houses began in South Korea for professional StarCraft players.

It also refers to gambling establishments.

== Concept ==
They provide opportunity for professional gaming teams to house all of their players in a streamlined environment that the teams can cater and control. Instead of the players having to link up online, all are in a single area so they can effectively scrimmage and practice with one another to get better at their respective video game. The houses can even have psychologists, analysts, nutritionists, trainers, and chefs so the players can take advantage of them should the need arise. The houses can bring a sense of reality into a virtually fueled lifestyle. Because all of the players are with one another, they must learn to live with each other and will bond through the good and bad. With how strenuous these players lives can be, it is important to keep them in their senses and have a grasp of social connection, apart from the games itself. The houses range in aesthetic appeal and can be smaller few bedroom houses with players sharing rooms where they might just have a mattress on the ground, or they can be extremely lavish and furnished with quality amenities in the suburbs of Los Angeles, California with A-List celebrities.

== Being used as a business ==
There are many teams renting out apartments or offices and turning them into gaming houses but at some city hubs of esports events there are businesses operating as a place to stay and practice as well as offering catering to the players and possibly transport, arranging marketing activities or promotional events, up-to-date computers, and consistent low-latency internet.

== Health concerns ==
Gaming is a highly discussed topic in the media, and naturally some concerns have risen that gaming houses are detrimental to both the physical and mental health of players. Players practice for around six to ten hours on any given day on their chosen title, within their “work environment” as to simulate competitive conditions. The players have almost no privacy, as the team is in close proximity to each other for almost 24 hours a day - which can spark arguments.

Another of the concerns regarding players' health is that the players are eating unhealthy meals due to time constraints. Combined with the high-level competitive field creating extra stress, the need is great for players to receive a fitness coach, a psychologist, a nutritionist, and other services - which they often employ in-house for players. Additionally, they receive regular visits from a physiotherapist and three fitness sessions a week to avoid neck, back and finger injuries after so many hours in the ergonomic chairs.
