= Summit1g =

American Twitch streamer (born 1987)

summit1g
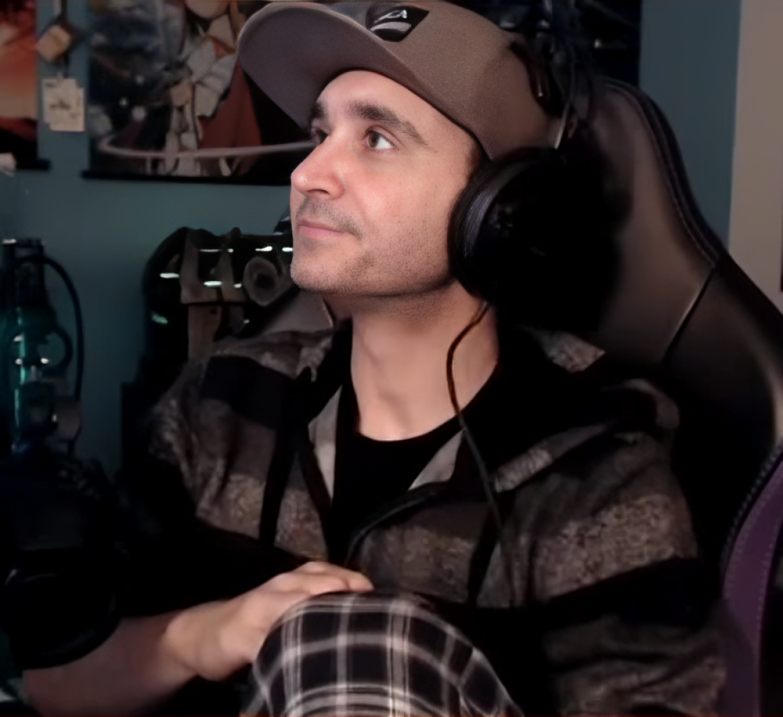
- Lazar in 2019
- Born: Jaryd Russell Lazar; April 23, 1987 (age 39); Colorado Springs, Colorado, U.S.

Twitch information
- Channel: summit1g
- Years active: 2012–present
- Genre: Gaming
- Followers: 6.4 million

YouTube information
- Channel: summit1g
- Years active: 2013–present
- Subscribers: 821 Thousand
- Views: 229 million
- Last updated: February 2, 2025

Jaryd Russell Lazar (born April 23, 1987), better known as summit1g, is an American Twitch streamer and former professional Counter-Strike: Global Offensive player. After retiring from competitive esports, Lazar became a well-known streamer on Twitch by streaming CS:GO and WarZ. He streams a variety of video games, such as Escape from Tarkov, Grand Theft Auto V, Sea of Thieves, Overwatch, DayZ, iRacing, Foxhole, Hearthstone and Rust.

== Streaming on Twitch ==
In 2017, Lazar garnered widespread attention for surpassing Syndicate's number of followers on Twitch. In 2018, Lazar's became the most-followed channel on the platform, surpassing Riot Games.

In May 2018, Lazar streamed gameplay with internet personality Jake Paul and received complaints and criticism from fans due to Paul's recent controversial behavior. Lazar told viewers, "I'm a little disappointed in chat. I had hoped the 1g squad to be a little bit different. I thought some people had a little bit thicker skin."

In April 2020, Lazar made comments about Valorant, a free-to-play multiplayer tactical first-person shooter developed by Riot Games. He claimed the game's closed beta was poorly managed, and that other streamers had manipulated Twitch's "Drops" system to receive game keys, giving them access to the closed beta to increase their viewer counts and the game's total number of viewers. He later apologized on Twitter, then subsequently deleted the apology.

In May 2020, Lazar signed a multi-year contract with Twitch to provide content and partnership support. As of September 27, 2023, he has over 6 million Twitch followers, and is ranked its 28th most popular streamer.

As of July 2021, Lazar has regularly speedrun Max Payne 3 during his Twitch streams. He achieved a world record in its "Hardcore" category while streaming live on July 2, 2021.

In 2023, he and EsfandTV were invited by One Championship to stream their very first MMA event held in the USA.

== Awards and nominations ==
Ceremony	Year	Category	Result	Ref.
The Streamer Awards	2021	Legacy Award	Nominated	
The Streamer Awards	2022	Best FPS Streamer	Nominated	
The Streamer Awards	2025	Gamer of the Year	Nominated	

== See also ==
- List of most-followed Twitch channels
