= Ninja (gamer) =

American streamer and YouTuber (born 1991)

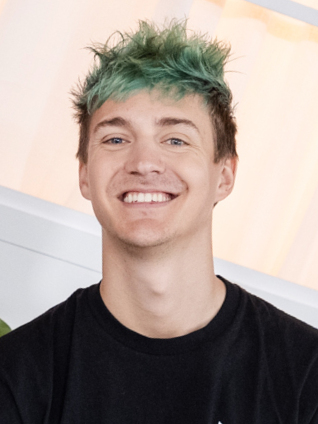
- Blevins in 2023
- Born: Richard Tyler Blevins; June 5, 1991 (age 35); Taylor, Michigan, U.S.
- Other name: NinjasHyper
- Education: Grayslake Central High School
- Occupations: Live streamer; YouTuber
- Spouse: Jessica Goch (m. 2017)
- Children: 1

Twitch information
- Channel: Ninja
- Years active: 2011–present
- Genre: Gaming
- Games: Fortnite Battle Royale; League of Legends; PlayerUnknown's Battlegrounds; Z1 Battle Royale; Halo; Apex Legends; Call of Duty: Warzone; Valorant
- Followers: 19.2 million

YouTube information
- Channel: Ninja
- Years active: 2011–present
- Genre: Gaming
- Subscribers: 23.4 million
- Views: 2.79 billion
- Last updated: November 21, 2026
- Website: teamninja.com

Richard Tyler Blevins (born June 5, 1991), known online as Ninja, is an American online streamer, YouTuber, and professional gamer. Blevins began streaming through participating in several esports teams in competitive play for Halo 3, and gradually picked up fame when he first started playing Fortnite Battle Royale in late 2017. Blevins gained the notice of mainstream media in March 2018 when he played Fortnite together with Drake, Travis Scott, and JuJu Smith-Schuster on stream, breaking a peak viewer count record on Twitch. Blevins had over 19 million followers on his Twitch channel, making it the 3rd most-followed Twitch channel as of July 2025.

== Early life ==
Richard Tyler Blevins was born on June 5, 1991, in Taylor, Michigan, a suburb of Detroit. He is of Welsh descent. He has two older brothers, Jonathan and Chris. He moved with his family to the Chicago suburbs when he was just an infant, where he went on to attend Grayslake Central High School. Upon graduation, he decided to play video games professionally, entering tournaments, joining professional organizations, and live streaming his games.

== Career ==
=== Esports and streaming ===
Blevins began playing Halo 3 professionally in 2009. He played for various organizations including Cloud9, Renegades, Team Liquid, and most recently, Luminosity Gaming. Blevins became a streamer in 2011. He began playing H1Z1, then moved to PlayerUnknown's Battlegrounds. He joined Luminosity Gaming in 2017 first as a Halo player, then to H1Z1, later moving to PUBG, where he won the PUBG Gamescom Invitational Squads classification in August 2017.

Blevins began streaming the newly released Fortnite Battle Royale shortly after the PUBG Gamescom Invitational. His viewership began to grow, which coincided with the game's growth in popularity over the late 2017/early 2018 period. His followers on Twitch had grown from 500,000 in September 2017 to over 2 million by March 2018.

In March 2018, Blevins became the first Twitch streamer to surpass 3 million followers on the platform. Later that month, he set the record for the largest concurrent audience on an individual stream (outside of tournament events), 635,000, while playing Fortnite with Drake, Travis Scott, and JuJu Smith-Schuster. This stream inspired Epic Games, the developers behind Fortnite, to host a charitable pro-am event featuring popular streamers like Blevins paired with famous celebrities in Fortnite at E3 2018 in June of that year; Blevins paired with electronic musician Marshmello and won the event. In April 2018, he broke his own viewing record during his event Ninja Vegas 2018, where he accumulated an audience of about 667,000 live viewers.

Blevins partnered with Red Bull Esports in June 2018, and held a special Fortnite event, the Red Bull Rise Till Dawn in Chicago on July 21, 2018, where players could challenge him. In April 2019, Red Bull released a limited-edition Red Bull can featuring an image of Blevins.

Blevins' rise in popularity on Twitch is considered to be synergistically tied to the success of Fortnite Battle Royale. In December 2018, Blevins estimated he had made close to US$10 million in 2018, while Epic Games reported they had earned over US$3 billion in revenue in the year, primarily due to Fortnite. He became the first PC player to surpass 5,000 Fortnite wins that same month. To acknowledge Blevins' importance to Fortnite's success, Epic added a Ninja-based cosmetic outfit to the game in January 2020 as the first part of an "Icon Series" for other real-life personalities associated with Fortnite.

Reuters reported that Blevins had been paid US$1 million by Electronic Arts to promote Apex Legends, a competing battle royale game to Fortnite, for playing the game on his Twitch stream and promoting the title through social media account during Apex release in February 2019.

On August 1, 2019, Blevins left Twitch to stream exclusively on Microsoft's Mixer platform. His wife and manager Jessica told The Verge that the contract with Twitch had limited the ability for Blevins to grow his brand outside of video gaming, and that because of the state of Twitch's community, "it really seemed like he was kind of losing himself and his love for streaming." In addition to a large number of subscribers on Twitch and Mixer, Blevins has over 24 million subscribers on YouTube as of April 2021. At the time, he was earning over $500,000 per month from streaming Fortnite and credits the game's free-to-play business model as a growth factor. Due to the shutdown of Mixer in July 2020, Blevins was released from his exclusivity deal, enabling him to stream on other platforms. On September 10, 2020, Blevins revealed that he would return to streaming on Twitch after signing an exclusive multiyear deal and streamed on the platform the same day. On September 1, 2022, exactly two years after re-signing to Twitch, Blevins changed his name on his social media profiles, such as his Twitter and YouTube, to "User Not Found" with background graphics stating "Time Out". He simultaneously tweeted "I just need a break...I don't know when I will be back, or where". On September 8, 2022, Blevins announced his return to streaming, stating that he would simulcast his content across multiple platforms, including Twitch, YouTube, TikTok, Instagram, and Facebook.

=== Other appearances ===
Blevins and his family were featured in several episodes of the television game show Family Feud in 2015. In an episode aired August 2019, after he had achieved his fame, his family returned as contestants on Celebrity Family Feud.

On September 18th, 2018, Blevins became the first professional esports player to be featured on the cover of ESPN The Magazine, marking a breakthrough into mainstream sports fame.

Blevins worked with the record label Astralwerks in October 2018 to compile an album titled Ninjawerks: Vol. 1 featuring original songs by electronic music acts. The album was released on December 14, 2018.

Blevins was one of several Internet celebrities featured in YouTube Rewind 2018: Everyone Controls Rewind. Blevins appeared briefly during the NFL's "The 100-Year Game" ad alongside numerous several professional football players that aired during Super Bowl LIII in 2019. He was the only participant in the commercial with no ties whatsoever to football in any form.

Blevins has released several books with publishing house Random House. Random House imprint, Clarkson Potter, published Get Good: My Ultimate Guide to Gaming on August 20, 2019.

Blevins participated in the second season of the Fox reality music competition The Masked Singer as "Ice Cream". He was voted out after his first performance to Devo's "Whip It" and Lil Nas X's "Old Town Road" and thus forced to be unmasked. In an interview with Entertainment Weekly, Blevins said that he accepted an invitation to participate since his wife was a fan of the show.

In 2022, Blevins partnered with MasterClass to create a 30-day curriculum in which Blevins provides advice on how to become a successful streamer.

=== Low taper fade ===
In January 2024, Blevins gained attention for getting a low taper fade haircut after clips of Twitch streamer and singer-songwriter Ericdoa singing "Imagine if Ninja got a low taper fade" went viral on TikTok. This boosted interest in the haircut significantly, with Google Trends reporting searches for the term "low taper fade" reached an all-time high following the moment.

While online sources have reported the craze to have reached its peak in mid January 2024, its fall off sparked a new genre of content largely focusing on the meme's supposed decline. This revived the meme, with the resulting content continuing to attract millions of views, most commonly depicting the meme as being "dragged" by Blevins' numerous references. This content often ironically claims that the low taper fade meme is "still massive", echoing what Blevins himself has said about the meme. Blevins has reacted to many of the meme's new variations on his live streams.

== Charitable work ==
In a fundraising charity stream held in February 2018, Blevins raised over $110,000 to be donated to the American Foundation for Suicide Prevention. During the first esports event in Fortnite Battle Royale in April 2018, Blevins gave away nearly $50,000 in prize money, with $2,500 of that going to the Alzheimer's Association. Later in April, he participated in the #Clips4Kids charity event with fellow streamers DrLupo and TimTheTatman that raised over $340,000 for St. Jude Children's Research Hospital. At E3 2018, Blevins and Marshmello won the Fortnite Pro-Am event which resulted in the donation of the $1 million prize to a charity of their choice. In 2024, Blevins and his older brother Jonathan raised $93,000 for cancer research, partnering with the University of Michigan and streaming from their football stadium.

== Controversies ==
In December 2016, Blevins released the address of a donor as retribution for having a racist screen name and donation message. This act, known online as "doxxing", is against the Twitch rules, which states they can result in an "indefinite suspension". Blevins was reported for this act, but only received a 48-hour suspension, which some believed was a result of Blevins' large audience on the platform. Blevins later tweeted that he deserved the punishment.

In March 2018, while in a stream with Nadeshot, Blevins improvised the word "nigga" while rapping to Logic's "44 More", a song in which the word was never actually said. This sparked controversy within his watching community and the general public. He later apologized for any offense caused and stated that he did not intend to say the word, instead attributing his use of the word to being "tongue-tied".

In July 2018, false rumors of Blevins's death from the fictional disease "Ligma" circulated. That same month, Blevins asked his moderators to ban users who used the word on his Twitch stream, as it was being overused in the chat to set up the Ligma joke.

In August 2018, Blevins stated that he does not stream with female gamers out of respect for his wife and to avoid the rumors that such streaming could create. He received mixed reactions; some said that he should set an example and not make it more difficult for female streamers to rise to prominence, while others supported his stance, claiming that he should be allowed to do what he wants to protect his marriage. In response to his critics, Blevins has since reaffirmed his support for gender equality and restated his commitment to his marriage, also mentioning some prominent female streamers by name. He noted that women are welcome to play with him in a group or at events as he claims such situations allow him to "control the narrative more, without stupid drama and rumors flooding into our lives."

In October 2018, Blevins reported a player for "having a higher ping" than him. This led to a player claiming on November 16, 2018, that they had been banned as a result of the report, which Epic Games denied. Both of these incidents caused backlash against Blevins on social media.

In November 2018, Blevins received criticism for falsely reporting IcyFive, a Fortnite player, for stream sniping. IcyFive claimed that he did not stream snipe Blevins and uploaded a video as proof. Blevins later apologized to IcyFive on Twitter but also accused the player of "playing the victim" and "milking" the incident, calling him "naive" for assuming players would be banned solely on his word.

== Personal life ==
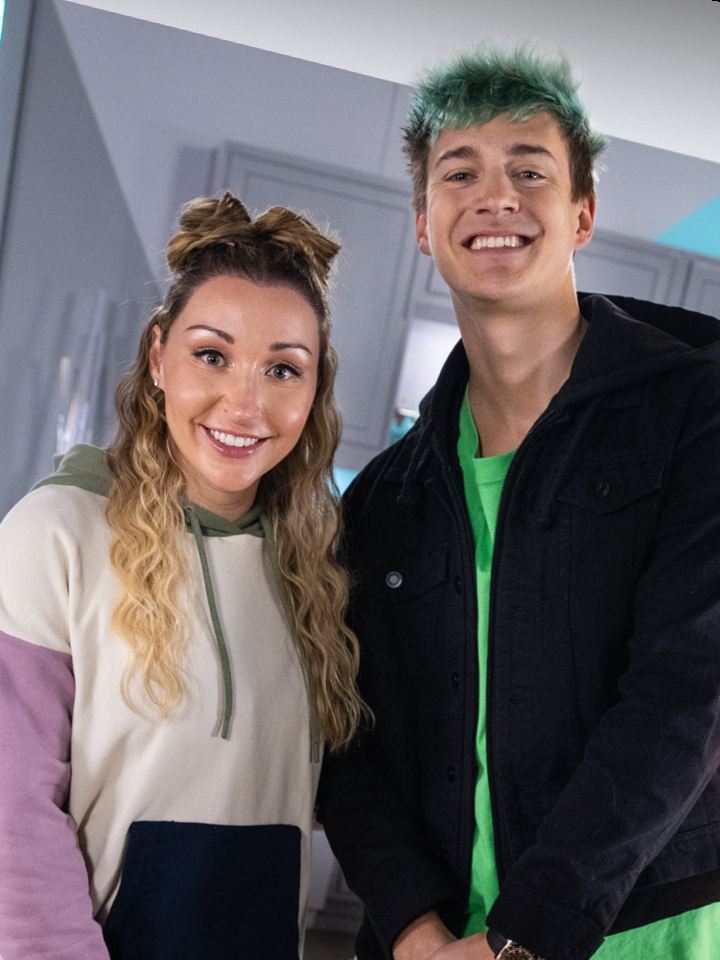
Blevins with his wife Jessica in 2023

Blevins has been married to his wife Jessica Blevins (née Goch) since 2017. Blevins has two brothers, Jonathan and Chris. Jonathan also streams on Twitch as "BeardedBlevins". Chris is a teacher.

On March 26, 2024, Blevins revealed that he had been diagnosed with melanoma, a form of skin cancer. A week later, on April 4, Blevins announced that he was officially cancer-free following a biopsy.

In March 2025, Blevins revealed his religious views and belief in Christianity in a stream for the first time, saying:

"Jesus is King. I mean, and even if you don't think he is, don't judge me for it and I won't judge you for it, man."

He claims that he and his wife have started attending church regularly, and that he is "just trying to be a better person."

On July 23, 2026, Blevins and his wife welcomed their first daughter.

== Filmography ==
=== Film ===
Year	Title	Role	Notes	Ref.
2021	Free Guy	Himself	Cameo	
2022	Hotel Transylvania: Transformania	Party Monster	Voice	

=== Television ===
Year	Title	Role	Notes
2015	Family Feud	Himself	Contestant
2019	Celebrity Family Feud	Himself	Episode: "Ninja vs. Juju and Jerry Springer vs. Doug Flutie"
2019	The Masked Singer	Ice Cream	Season 2
2021	Nickelodeon's Unfiltered	Himself	Episode: "Donut vs. The Volcano"
2022	Duncanville	Slayer	Episode: "Gamer vs. Gamer"
2022	Home Economics	Himself	Episode: "Melatonin 10 Mg Tablets, $14.99"
2024	Solar Opposites	Bradd	Episode: "The Sci-Fi Rollerblades"

=== Web series ===
Year	Title	Role	Notes
2020	Red vs. Blue	Himself	Promotional short: "Red vs. Blue presents Halo in Fortnite"

== Awards and nominations ==
Year	Award	Category	Result	Ref.
2018	Streamy Awards	Breakout Creator	Nominated	
2018	Streamy Awards	Creator of the Year	Nominated	
2018	Streamy Awards	Gaming	Won	
2018	Streamy Awards	Live Streamer	Won	
2018	The Game Awards 2018	Content Creator of the Year	Won	
2018	Esports Awards	Esports Personality of the Year	Won	
2018	Esports Awards	Streamer of the Year	Won	
2019	Kids' Choice Awards	Favorite Gamer	Nominated	
2019	Shorty Awards	Twitch Streamer of the Year	Won	
2019	Streamy Awards	Creator of the Year	Nominated	
2019	Streamy Awards	Live Streamer	Won	
2019	Forbes 30 Under 30	Games	Included	
2020	Kids' Choice Awards	Favorite Gamer	Nominated	
2020	Streamy Awards	Live Streamer	Nominated	
2021	Kids' Choice Awards	Favorite Male Social Star	Nominated	
2024	Kids' Choice Awards	Favorite Gamer	Nominated	
2025	Kids' Choice Awards	Favorite Gamer	Nominated	
2025	The Streamer Awards	Best Battle Royale Streamer	Nominated	

== See also ==
- List of most-followed Twitch channels
