= RAMZES666 =

Russian esports player (born 1999)

Roman Kushnarev
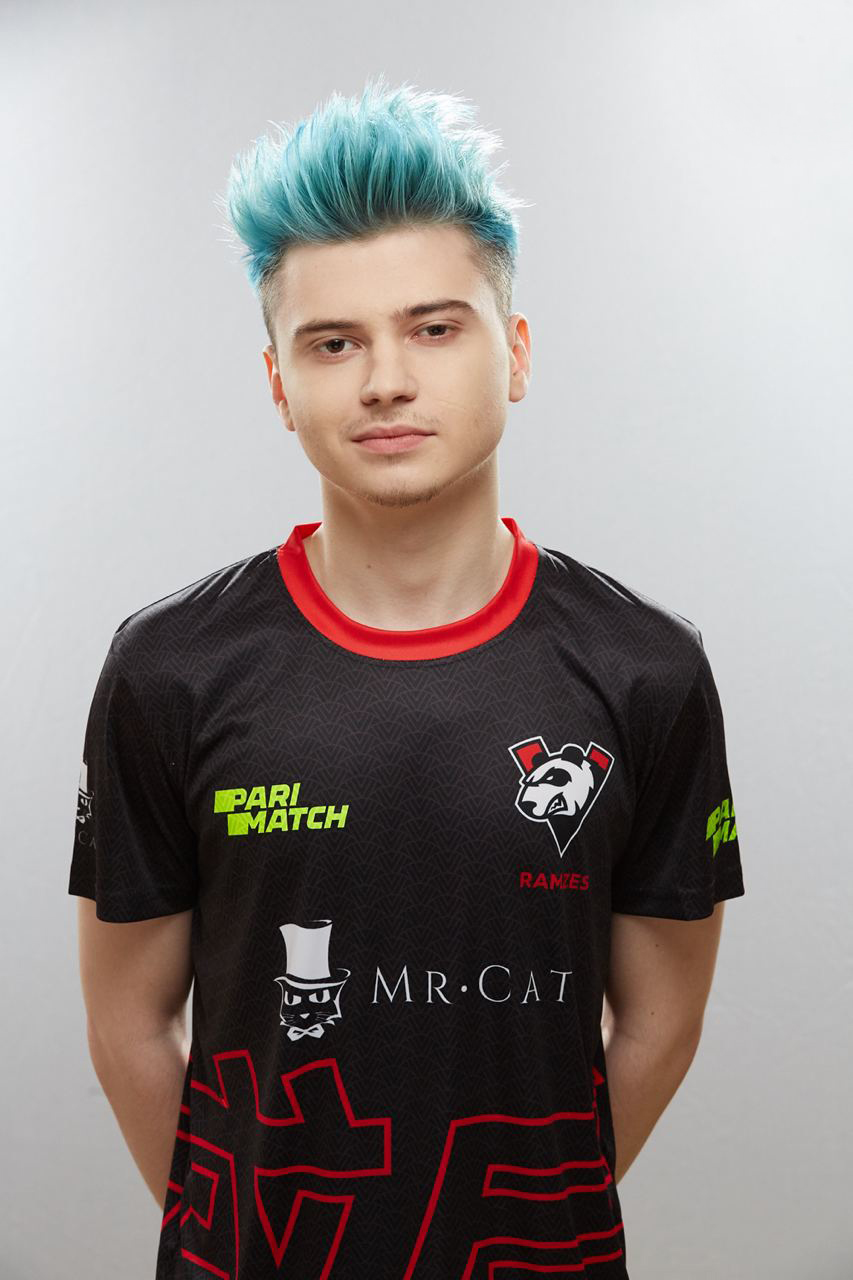
- Kushnarev at The International 2019

Personal information
- Born: April 25, 1999 (age 26); Novokuznetsk, Russia
- Nationality: Russian

Roman Andreevich Kushnarev (born 25 April 1999), better known as RAMZES666, is a Russian professional Dota 2 player. He gained prominence as the carry for Virtus.pro, winning a then‑record five Valve‑sponsored Majors between 2017 and 2018, and later finished third at The International 2024 with Tundra Esports. In June 2025 Kushnarev became an ambassador for the newly formed Team Yandex roster.

== Early life ==
Kushnarev was born in Novokuznetsk, Kemerovo Oblast, where he practised boxing and football before taking up video games. He competed in local LAN events from age 15 and joined the semi‑professional mix ScaryFaceZ in April 2015.

== Professional career ==
=== Early teams (2015–2016) ===
After short stints with CIS Rejects and Team Spirit, Kushnarev debuted at Valve’s Shanghai Major but left the roster shortly afterwards. A spell with Team Empire yielded a top‑12 finish at the Manila Major.

=== Virtus.pro (2016–2019) ===
Kushnarev joined Virtus.pro in August 2016 under captain Alexei "Solo" Berezin. The roster became one of the most dominant line‑ups of the Dota Pro Circuit, winning ESL One Hamburg 2017 (the first Valve Major of the season) and four further Majors in 2017–18, as well as finishing fifth at The International 2017 and 5‑6th at The International 2018. On 10 November 2017 he became the first player from the CIS region—and the fourth worldwide—to reach 10,000 solo‑queue MMR. Kushnarev left Virtus.pro after a 9‑12th‑place finish at The International 2019.

=== Evil Geniuses (2019–2020) ===
In September 2019 he joined North American organisation Evil Geniuses as an off‑laner. EG finished runner‑up at the Leipzig Major before the 2020 season was moved online. Travel restrictions led to his benching and eventual free agency in early 2021.

=== Later career (2021–2023) ===
Between 2021 and 2023 Kushnarev played for Natus Vincere, a rebuilt Virtus.pro line‑up, Darkside and HellRaisers (re‑signed as 9Pandas). He departed 9Pandas in December 2023 amid roster instability.

=== Tundra Esports loan and TI 2024 ===
In May 2024 L1GA TEAM loaned Kushnarev to Tundra Esports as an off‑laner for the season. Tundra placed fourth at Riyadh Masters and secured a third‑place finish at The International 2024—Kushnarev’s best result at the event. His loan expired on 18 September 2024, after which he paused competitive play.

=== Team Yandex ambassador (2025–present) ===
On 25 June 2025 Kushnarev was announced as the inaugural ambassador for the newly created Team Yandex Dota 2 roster.

== Playstyle and reception ==
Kushnarev is known for aggressive farming patterns and a wide hero pool. Analysts highlighted his efficiency during Virtus.pro’s Major‑winning era, while his early‑career milestone of 10,000 MMR was cited as evidence of exceptional mechanical skill.

== Media presence and awards ==
- Named the most influential esports personality in the CIS region by Forbes Russia (2019).
- Ad campaigns with Head & Shoulders (2018) and Nike (2020).

== Controversies ==
During the group stage of The International 2024 Kushnarev wrote the line “k1 monkey=” in all‑chat, which some viewers interpreted as a racial slur. He later clarified that the message referred to his opponent's hero choice, Monkey King, and apologised on social media.
