= Nickmercs =

American streamer and content creator (born 1990)

- Born: November 21, 1990 (age 35)
- Organizations: FaZe Clan; 100 Thieves

Kick information
- Channel: NICKMERCS
- Years active: 2023–present
- Followers: 255.3 thousand (September 4, 2025)

Twitch information
- Channel: NICKMERCS
- Years active: 2010–present
- Genre: Gaming
- Games: Apex Legends; Fortnite Battle Royale; Call of Duty: Warzone
- Followers: 6.70 million (February 17, 2026)

YouTube information
- Channel: NICKMERCS
- Years active: 2011–present
- Subscribers: 4.10 million (February 17, 2026)
- Views: 933 million (February 17, 2026)

Nick Kolcheff (born November 21, 1990), known professionally as Nickmercs, is an American online streamer, YouTuber and influencer.

== Career ==
Kolcheff has earned over $190,000 in Fortnite prizes.

In May 2019, Kolcheff split from 100 Thieves, citing failed promises and poor management that included a promise of 5% ownership stake in the company. Kolcheff also had a falling out with 100 Thieves co-owner and founder Matthew "Nadeshot" Haag due to this and the two have not spoken since Kolcheff left the organization. He joined FaZe Clan later that month.

Despite offers from rival streaming services, Kolcheff said he would stay with Twitch. Kolcheff has garnered upwards of 70,000 viewers on Twitch. He is estimated to have earned $6 million in 2019 and was the 10th highest earning gamer that year.

In May 2023, a skin based on Kolcheff was announced for Call of Duty: Modern Warfare II. The skin was removed from the game a month later due to a tweet he made in reaction to a fight that broke out in California as a result of schools including content about the LGBTQ community in their curriculum. The tweet stated: "They should leave little children alone. That's the real issue". In June 2024, he faced backlash for claiming there is no such thing as transgender people. Nickmercs was then later suspended from Twitch. In a Twitter post addressing his suspension, Nickmercs said it was for using the slur "tranny" and said that in the future he would use the phrase "mental health disorder" against transgender people. In October 2023, Kolcheff signed a one-year non-exclusive deal with Kick, which included a gambling deal valued around $10 million. The deal had ended in late 2024 as Nick's contract had expired and he decided to make his return to Twitch.

In January 2025, Kolcheff announced that he would be leaving FaZe Clan, stating that he had no issues with the organization and it was "just time to move forward".

== Personal life ==
Kolcheff is married and has two sons.

== Awards and nominations ==
Year	Ceremony	Category	Result	Ref.
2020	11th Shorty Awards	Twitch Streamer of the Year	Nominated	
2020	The Game Awards 2020	Content Creator of the Year	Nominated	
2020	10th Streamy Awards	Live streamer	Won	
2021	11th Streamy Awards	Live streamer	Nominated	
2021	The Streamer Awards	Best Battle Royale Streamer	Nominated	

== See also ==
- List of most-followed Twitch channels
