= 2023 MTV MIAW Awards =

Annual Latin American music awards

- Date: August 4, 2023
- Location: Pepsi Center WTC, Mexico City
- Hosted by: Guaynaa and Domelipa

Highlights
- Most wins: Kenia Os, Peso Pluma, Kim Loaiza, Rivers, Yeri Mua (2)
- Most nominations: Peso Pluma (9)
- Website: Official site

Television/radio coverage
- Network: MTV; TikTok; Paramount+; Pluto TV; Facebook

The 10th Annual MTV MIAW Awards took place on August 4, 2023, at the Pepsi Center WTC in Mexico City, to recognize the best in Latin American pop culture of 2023. It was broadcast live on MTV Latin America, as well as on TikTok and Paramount+ on August 6, 2023, the red carpet was available on Pluto TV. The ceremony was hosted by Puerto Rican singer Guaynaa and Mexican influencer Domelipa.

The nominations were announced on July 4, 2023. Regional Mexican singer Peso Pluma received the most nominations with nine, followed by Rauw Alejandro, Bad Bunny and Rosalía, each with six. Mexican singers Kenia Os, Peso Pluma and Kim Loaiza, and Mexican streamer Rivers, all received the most awards with two wins each.

== Performers ==
The list of performers were announced on August 2, 2023.

Artist(s)	Song(s)	Ref
Yng Lvcas	"La bebé"	
Guaynaa	"Pa' que afinken"	
Eladio Carrión	"Coco Chanel"	
Kenia Os	"La invitación" / "Malas decisiones"	

== Winners and nominees ==
Winners will be listed first and highlighted in bold.

=== Music ===
MIAW Artist	Mexican Artist
**Kenia Os**; Bad Bunny; Karol G; Peso Pluma; Rosalía; Feid; Rauw Alejandro; Danna Paola	**Kim Loaiza**; Alemán; Christian Nodal; Natanael Cano; Santa Fe Klan; Peso Pluma; Yoss Bones; Gera MX
Flow Artist	Artist to Watch
**Nicki Nicole**; Rels B; Young Miko; Aczino; Eladio Carrión; Snow tha Product; Tiago PZK; Duki	**Peso Pluma**; Young Miko; Villano Antillano; The Change; Yng Lvcas; Michelle Maciel; Mora; Renee
K-Pop Domination	Supreme Perreo
**Blackpink**; Seventeen; Super Junior; Lisa; Twice; TXT; NCT Dream; Monsta X	**"La Bebé" – Peso Pluma & Yng Lvcas**; "Marisola" (remix) – Cris MJ, Nicki Nicole, Duki & Standly; "Punto 40" – Rauw Alejandro; "Baby Otaku" – Pablito Pesadilla, Polimá Westcoast, NickoOg Clk & Fran C; "La Jumpa" – Arcángel & Bad Bunny; "Yandel 150" – Yandel & Feid; "Hey Mor" – Ozuna & Feid; "Classy 101" – Feid & Young Miko
Viral Anthem	Global Hit of the Year
**"Malas Decisiones" – Kenia Os**; "Ella Baila Sola" – Eslabón Armado & Peso Pluma; "Gatita" – Bellakath; "Shakira: Bzrp Music Sessions, Vol. 53" – Shakira & Bizarrap; "Shorty Party" – Cartel de Santa & La Kelly; "Bloody Mary" – Lady Gaga; "Kill Bill" – SZA; "La Bebé" – Peso Pluma & Yng Lvcas	**"TQG" – Shakira & Karol G**; "Un x100to" – Grupo Frontera & Bad Bunny; "Flowers" – Miley Cyrus; "Late Night Talking" – Harry Styles; "Beso" – Rosalía & Rauw Alejandro; "Anti-Hero" – Taylor Swift; "Ella Baila Sola" – Eslabón Armado & Peso Pluma; "Unholy" – Sam Smith featuring Kim Petras
Music Ship of the Year	Video of the Year
**"Los del Espacio" – Lit Killah, Duki, Emilia, Tiago PZK, FMK, Rusherking, María Becerra & Big One**; "Beso" – Rosalía & Rauw Alejandro; "tqum" – Sofía Reyes & Danna Paola; "Para No Verte Más" – Thalía & Kenia Os; "Chanel" – Becky G & Peso Pluma; "Un x100to" – Grupo Frontera & Bad Bunny; "Shakira: Bzrp Music Sessions, Vol. 53" – Shakira & Bizarrap; "Mejor Así" – Mario Bautista & Adriel Favela	**"Te Quiero Tanto" – Kevin Kaarl**; "Muñecas" – Tini, La Joaqui & Steve Aoki; "Vampiros" – Rosalía & Rauw Alejandro; "Señorita Revolución" – Bruses; "Si Me Voy" – Cuco featuring The Marías; "Where She Goes" – Bad Bunny; "Bombas" – Alemán & Ximena Sariñana; "Continental" – Bratty, NSQK & Méne

=== Digital ===
MIAW Icon	Creator of the Year
**Wendy Guevara**; Chingu Amiga; El Mariana; Javier Ibarreche; Lily García; Roberto Martínez; Rivers; Ibai Llanos	**HotSpanish**; Jezzini; Tammy Parra; Dani Valle; Ramón Vega; Andrés Johnson; MissaSinfonía; Damián Cervantes
Global Creator	Trend Master
**Claudipia**; Ibai Llanos; MrBeast; Logan Paul; St Anthony; PewDiePie; Mr Buzdon; Martínez Twins; Beer; Alix Earle; The Usos; Kris Collins; RackaRacka	**Los de Ñam (Food)**; Eduardo Sacal (Interviews); Esen Alva (Travelling); La Granja del Borrego (Animals); Fer Jalil (Make-Up); Dakota Balk (Drag & Make-Up); Iamcharli.e (Technology); Historia para Tontos (History)
Best Style	MIAWudio of the Year
**Kim Loaiza**; Priscy Escoto; Tammy Parra; Maria Bottle; Nicki Nicole; Sebastián Esquivel; Johnny Caz; Peso Pluma; Frozone; Bob Parr	**"Tenis, Ropa?" (Yeri Mua)**; "Peaches" (The Super Mario Bros. Movie); "Puro Cabezeo" (Medio Metro); "¿Hablas inglés?" (Charlotte Lascurain); "Que Agusticidad" (Don Silverio); "Que paso wey" (El Mariana); "Este Suceso"; "Ella No Impone Moda" (Belinda)
Coreo Crack	Celebrity Crush
**IamFerv**; Aaron Mercury; Amaranta; Lossiblings; Ara & Fer Hernández; Tini; Christian Chávez; Vale Madrigal de 19 años de edad	**Aaron Mercury**; Karely Ruiz; Alex Hoyer; Carlota Madrigal; Pedro Pascal; Domelipa; Emilia; Guaynaa
Fandom	Couple Goals
**Pollitos de Color - Rivers**; Juaniquiladores – Juan Guarnizo; Dreamers – Danna Paola; Brillos – Kunno; Papuritos – AriGameplays; Tinistas – Tini; Belifans – Belinda; Ángeles – Rosalía	**Yurielkys Ojeda & Hi Soy Valeria**; Rosalía & Rauw Alejandro; Christian Nodal & Cazzu; Duki & Emilia; Guaynaa & Lele; Karol G & Feid; Danna Paola & Alex Hoyer; Los Rulés
Viral Bomb	Embarrassment of the Year
**Yerimua's beefs**; Karely Ruiz & Santa Fe Klan get hot; Bad Bunny throws a cellphone; Messi says "¿Qué Mirás Bobo?"; Shakira disses Piqué; Tammy Parra gets lied to; Maricheli finds a boyfriend; Al overthrows the world	**Martha Higareda's tall tales**; Salt Bae at the 2022 FIFA World Cup final; Alfredo Adame vs the world; Medio Metro leaves Sonidero
Podcast Boss	Comedy Boss
**Un Tal Fredo**; Hermanos de Leche; Pinky Promise at Los Ángeles; Aislinn Derbez – La Magia del Caos; De Todo un Mucho – Yordi & Martha; Envinadas; Privadas de la Libertad; Las Poderosas	**Chinguamiga**; Jalas o Te Rajas; Andrés Johnson; Claus Maluf; LOL 5; 4/20 – Ricardo Pérez; Damián Cervantes; Paco de Miguel
"La Loba" of the Year	Streamer of the Year
**Lizbeth Rodríguez**; Shakira; Domelipa; María Becerra; Kim Loaiza; Anitta; Vico Volkova; Karol G	**Rivers**; El Mariana; Juan Guarnizo; AriGameplay; Chicharito; Amablitz; Quackity; Spreen

=== Entertainment ===
Reality of the Year	Killer Series / Movie
**Marcos Ginocchio – Gran Hermano Argentina**; Leslie Gallardo – La Venganza de los Ex VIP 2; Ricardo Peralta "Torpecillo" – Master Chef VIP; Lizbeth Rodríguez – La Venganza de los Ex; Dania Méndez – La Casa de los Famosos; Nelson – La Academia; José Eduardo Derbez – De Viaje; Eduardo "El Chile" Miranda – Acapulco Shore	**The Super Mario Bros. Movie**; The Last of Us; Spider-Man: Across the Spider-Verse; Guardians of the Galaxy Vol. 3; Wednesday; Yellowjackets; The Little Mermaid; Scream VI
