= Kenia Os discography =

Mexican singer discography

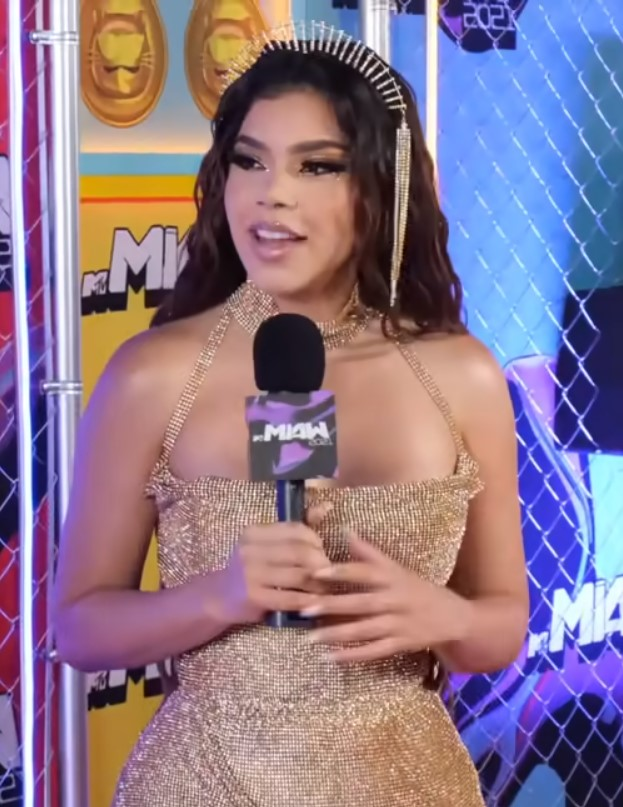
- Kenia Os at MTV MIAW 2021
- Studio albums: 3
- EPs: 3
- Live albums: 1
- Singles: 20

Mexican youtuber and singer Kenia Os has released three studio albums, three extended plays, one live album and 16 singles (as well as ten as a featured artist).

== Studio albums ==
List of studio albums, with selected details and certifications
Title	Album details	Certifications
Cambios de Luna	Released: March 24, 2022; Label: Sony Music Mexico; Format: CD, digital download, streaming	
K23	Released: October 26, 2022; Label: Sony Music Mexico; Format: CD, digital download, streaming	
Pink Aura	Released: April 24, 2024; Label: Sony Music Mexico; Format: CD, digital download, streaming	AMPROFON: Gold

== Extended plays ==
List of EPs, with selected details
Title	Album details
En Vivo (Acústico)	Released: January 18, 2019; Label: Lizos Music; Format: Digital download, streaming
Canciones Pa Mi Ex Vol.1	Released: October 16, 2020; Label: Lizos Music; Format: Digital download, streaming
Live From Blackwood Studio	Released: May 8, 2021; Label: K Records; Format: Digital download, streaming

== Singles ==
=== As lead artist ===
List of singles as lead artist, with certifications, showing year released and album name
Title	Year	Peak chart positions						Certifications	Album
Title	Year	ARG	MEX	PAN	PAR	URU	WW	Certifications	Album
"Por Siempre"	2018	—	—	—	—	—	—		Non-album singles
"Bonita"	2018	—	—	—	—	—	—		Non-album singles
"11:11" (with Kid Gallo)	2019	—	—	—	—	—	—		Non-album singles
"Energía" (with Kid Gallo, Alan Jacques, Amador & D. Krugga)	2019	—	—	—	—	—	—		Non-album singles
"Mentiroso"	2019	—	—	—	—	—	—		Non-album singles
"Delito"	2019	—	—	—	—	—	—		Non-album singles
"Escríbeme"	2020	—	—	—	—	—	—		Non-album singles
"Diamantes" (with Gera MX)	2020	—	—	—	—	—	—		Non-album singles
"Tercera Noche"	2020	—	—	—	—	—	—		Non-album singles
"Cócteles"	2020	—	—	—	—	—	—		Non-album singles
"Dinero"	2020	—	—	—	—	—	—		Non-album singles
"Tsunami"	2020	—	—	—	—	—	—		Canciones Pa Mi Ex Vol.1
"La Noche"	2021	—	—	—	—	—	—	AMPROFON: Gold	Cambios de Luna
"Joder" (with Snow Tha Product)	2022	—	24	—	—	—	—	AMPROFON: Gold	Non-album single
"Se Fue La Luz"	2022	—	—	—	—	—	—		Cambios de Luna
"Llévatelo"	2022	—	—	—	—	—	—	AMPROFON: Platinum	Cambios de Luna
"Todo My Love"	2022	—	—	—	—	—	—		Non-album single
"Mía Mía"	2022	—	—	—	—	—	—	AMPROFON: Gold	K23
"Flores"	2022	—	—	—	—	—	—		K23
"Malas Decisiones"	2023	—	12	—	—	—	176	AMPROFON: Diamond	K23
"Para No Verte Más" (with Thalía)	2023	—	— (Note: "Para No Verte Más" did not enter the Mexico Songs Chart, but peaked at number 18 on the Mexico Airplay Pop Chart (Monitor Latino).)	—	—	8	—		Thalía's Mixtape
"Rumores" (with Gera MX)	2023	—	—	—	—	—	—		Non-album single
"Más Te Va A Doler"	2023	—	—	—	—	—	—		Non-album single
"Año Sabático"	2023	—	—	—	—	—	—		Non-album single
"F* OFF" (with Bella Poarch)	2024	—	—	—	—	—	—		
"En 4" (with Anitta)	2025	—	—	—	—	—	—		

=== Promotional singles ===
List of promotional singles, showing year released and album or EP name
Title	Year	Album
"Tenía Que Llegar"	2020	Canciones Pa Mi Ex Vol.1
"Te Odio"	2020	Canciones Pa Mi Ex Vol.1
"Tu Peor Pesadilla"	2020	Canciones Pa Mi Ex Vol.1
"¿Qué Pasa?" (with Andry Kiddos)	2020	Canciones Pa Mi Ex Vol.1
"Fue Lindo"	2021	Canciones Pa Mi Ex Vol.1
"Blanca Navidad"	2022	Non-album single
"La Invitación"	2022	K23
"Good Boy"	2023	K23

=== As featured artist ===
List of singles as featured artist, with certifications, showing year released and album name
Title	Year	Certifications	Album
"Otra Igual" (Bhavi featuring Kenia Os & Cashweapon)	2019		Non-album single
"Uh La La (Remix)" (Alex Coppel featuring Kenia Os & Chucho Rivas)	2019		Non-album single
"Na De Na (Remix)" (Fernanda featuring Kenia Os)	2020		Non-album single
"Gracias (Remix)" (Mariah Angeliq featuring Kenia Os & Andry Kiddos)	2020		Normal
"Ella (Remix De Ellas)" (Pitizion featuring Kenia Os & Nicole Zignago)	2020		Non-album single
"Me Dolió" (Alan Jaques, Kenia Os, Kid Gallo & Amador)	2021		Non-album single
"Tamagotchi (Remix)" (Francely Abreuu featuring Kenia Os)	2021		Non-album single
"Desamor Feliz (Remix)" (Leon Leiden featuring Kenia Os)	2021		Non-album single
"Toketeo" (Ghetto Kids featuring Kenia Os & Malo)	2021	AMPROFON: Gold	Non-album single
"Tírame Un Hello (Remix)" (Ramon Vega featuring Kenia Os)	2022		Non-album single
"Plutón" (CNCO featuring Kenia Os)	2022		XOXO
"Mi Salida Contigo" (Ha*Ash featuring Kenia Os)	2022	AMPROFON: Gold	Haashtag
"Tú Sí" (Mar Lucas featuring Kenia Os & Beéle)	2022		Non-album single
"Ocean" (Boza featuring Kenia Os)	2022		Non-album single
"Por Dentro" (Rels B featuring Kenia Os)	2023		Non-album single
"Love, Money, Fame (Kenia Os Remix)" (Seventeen & Kenia Os featuring DJ Khaled)	2024		Non-album single

== Other certified songs ==
List of other songs with certifications, showing year released and album name
Title	Year	Certifications	Album
"Los Santos"	2022	AMPROFON: Gold	Cambios de Luna
