= 2021 MTV MIAW Awards =

Annual Latin American music awards 2021

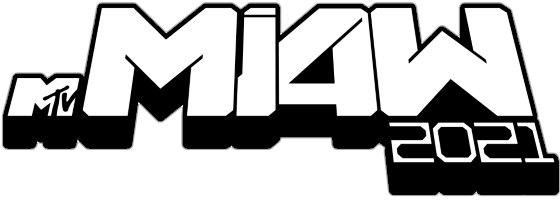
- Date: 13 July
- Location: Quarry Studios, Mexico City
- Hosted by: Kali Uchis, Kenia Os
- Website: miaw.mtvla.com

Television/radio coverage
- Network: MTV Latin America

The 8th Annual MTV MIAW Awards took place on July 13, 2021, at the Quarry Studios in Mexico City. It was broadcast live by MTV Latin America. The awards celebrated the best of Latin music and the digital world of the millennial generation. The list of nominees was revealed on June 7, 2021. Leading the list of nominees was Karol G with six nominations, followed by Bad Bunny y Danna Paola with five each.

== Performances ==
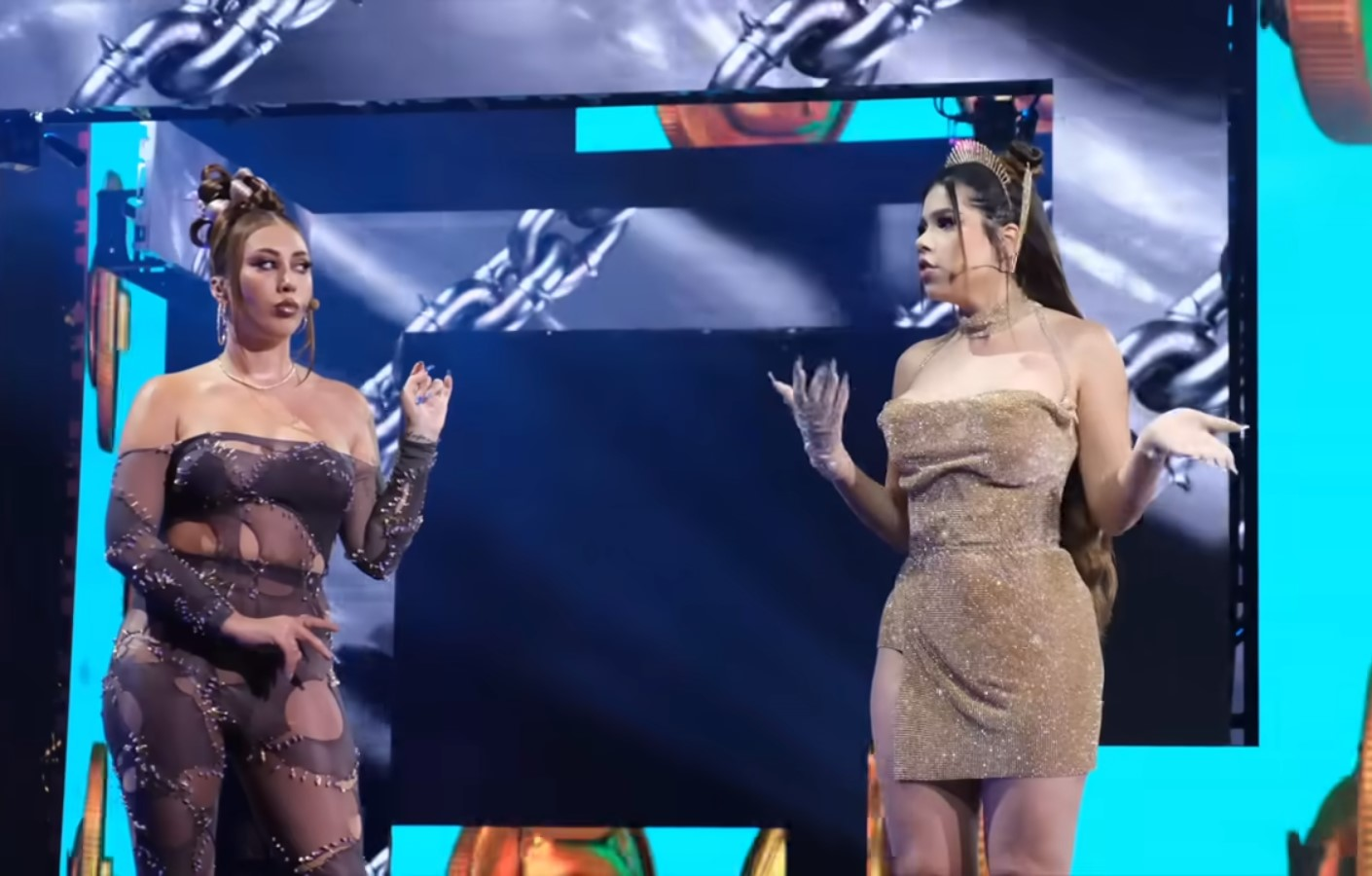
Hosts Kali Uchis and Kenia Os

The performers were announced via the official MTV Miaw website.

Performers at the 2021 MTV Millennial Awards
Performer(s)	Song(s)
Kali Uchis	"Telepatía"
Danna Paola	"Mía" "Calla Tú"
Christian Nodal	"Botella Tras Botella"
C. Tangana	"Párteme La Cara" (with Ed Maverick) "Cambia!"
Rauw Alejandro	"Todo de Ti"

== Winners and nominees ==
Nominees were announced on June 7, 2021. Winners are listed in bold.

=== Music ===
Hit of the Year	Global Hit of the Year
**"Botella Tras Botella" – Gera MX & Christian Nodal**; "Bichota" – Karol G; "Dákiti" – Bad Bunny & Jhay Cortez; "Fiel" – Wisin, Jhay Cortez, & Los Legendarios; "Telepatía" – Kali Uchis; "Hawái" – Maluma; "Relación (Remix)" – Sech, Daddy Yankee, J Balvin, Rosalía, & Farruko; "La Curiosidad" – Jay Wheeler, DJ Nelson, & Myke Towers	**"Golden" – Harry Styles**; "Drivers License" – Olivia Rodrigo; "Levitating" – Dua Lipa ft. DaBaby; "Leave the Door Open" – Silk Sonic (Bruno Mars & Anderson .Paak); "Save Your Tears" – The Weeknd; "Peaches" – Justin Bieber ft. Daniel Caesar & Giveon; "Kiss Me More" – Doja Cat ft. SZA; "Montero (Call Me by Your Name)" – Lil Nas X
Video of the Year	Music-Ship of the Year
**"La Noche de Anoche" – Bad Bunny & Rosalía**; "Nominao/Hong Kong" – C. Tangana, Jorge Drexler & Andrés Calamaro; "Telepatía" – Kali Uchis; "Niño" – Ed Maverick, Muelas de Gallo; "Popular" – Zoé; "Ojos Noche" – Elsa y Elmar ft. Carla Morrison	**"Baila Conmigo" – Selena Gomez & Rauw Alejandro**; "Lo Vas a Olvidar" – Billie Eilish & Rosalía; "Location" – Karol G, Anuel AA, & J Balvin; "La Nota" – Manuel Turizo, Rauw Alejandro, & Myke Towers; "No Bailes Sola" – Danna Paola, Sebastián Yatra; "Párteme la Cara" – C. Tangana & Ed Maverick; "La Noche de Anoche" – Bad Bunny & Rosalía; "Las Nenas" – Natti Natasha, Farina, Cazzu & La Duraca
MIAW Artist	Mexican Artist
**Bad Bunny**; Karol G; J Balvin; Maluma; Rauw Alejandro; Danna Paola; C. Tangana; Natti Natasha	**Alemán**; Danna Paola; Gera MX; Christian Nodal; Mon Laferte; Reik
Colombian Artist	Argentine Artist
**Sebastián Yatra**; Karol G; Piso 21; J Balvin; Camilo; Maluma	**Tini**; BZRP; Khea; Nicki Nicole; Duki; Cazzu
Viral Anthem	Emerging
**"Pareja del Año" – Sebastián Yatra & Myke Towers**; "La Tóxica" – Farruko; "El Makinon" – Karol G & Mariah Angeliq; "Se Te Nota" – Lele Pons & Guaynaa; "BZRP Music Sessions #36" – BZRP & Nathy Peluso; "Reloj" – Rauw Alejandro & Anuel AA; "Hecha Pa' Mi" – Boza; "¿Quién Te Crees?" – MC Davo ft. Calibre 50	**Humbe**; Leon Leiden; Renee; Natanael Cano; Yendry; Mario Puglia; Bratty; María Becerra
K-Pop Dominion	Fandom
**BTS**; Rosé; Blackpink; IU; TXT; Seventeen; Twice; (G)I-DLE	**BTS ARMY (BTS)**; Jukis (JD Pantoja & Kimberly Loaiza); BLINKs (Blackpink); Keninis (Kenia Os); Dreamers (Danna Paola); Cachers (Calle y Poché); Team Ken Fandom; CNCOwners (CNCO)

=== Entertainment ===
Killer TV Series	Reality Show of the Year
**WandaVision**; The Handmaid's Tale; Euphoria; Luis Miguel, La Serie. T2; The Mandalorian; El Internado: Las Cumbres; The Boys; Emily in Paris	**Acapulco Shore**; ¿Quién es la máscara?; Guerreros; Shark Tank; La Más Draga; Exatlón
Gamer Obsession	Favorite Podcast
**Free Fire**; Among Us; Fall Guys; Fortnite; Grand Theft Auto V; League of Legends; Call of Duty: Warzone	**Radio Divaza**; La Cotorrisa; Creativo; El Frasco; Leyendas Legendarias; lilhuddy2; Karime Kooler; Niñas Bien

=== Digital World ===
MIAW Icon	MIAW Instagram Stories User
**Kenia Os**; Kimberly Loaiza; Kunno; Domelipa; Jashlem; Jimena Jiménez; Brianda Deyanara; Rod Contreras	**Elán**; Bad Bunny; Danna Paola; Juanpa Zurita; Kenia Os; Kim Shantal; Luisito Comunica; Paco de Miguel
Creator of the Year	Global Creator
**Kimberly Loaiza**; Amadora; Caín Guzmán; Darian Rojas; Ignacia Antonia; Kevlex; Legna Hernández; Ralf	**Martinez Twins**; Bella Poarch; Charli D'Amelio; Dixie D'Amelio; Lele Pons; Naim Darrechi; Noah Beck
Favorite New School	Viral Bomb
**Mau López**; Aaron Mercury; Amaranta; Augusto Gimenez; Carlota Madrigal; Ingratax; Marian Krawstor; Melipandda	**El Reencuentro de RBD**; SilhouetteChallenge; Ay Rico Rico Rico; Ciclovía de Puebla; El Niño Del Oxxo; La Chilindrina en Bikini; Las Niñas del Cumpleaños; Máteme Ese Recuerdo de Ese Amargo Amor
Very Cringe	Viral Philosopher
**El Chico Gucci**; Fails de Alfredo Adame; Golpiza Campo de Golf; López Gatell de Vacaciones; Paty Navidad conspiranoica; Pelea Fake Mariana Rodríguez y Bárbara de Regil; Pepillo Origel Se Vacuna; Trump No Accepta Derrota	**Cardi B**; Camilo Pulgarin; Josi; Las Más Perdidas; Manelyk; Pamela Chup; Trixy Star
Crack Choreo	Lipsync Master
**iamferv**; ItsMitch; Kunno; Libardo Isaza; Los Siblings; Mont Pantoja; Rod Contreras; Samuel López	**JD Pantoja**; Erika Buenfil; Orson Padilla; Celes Salas; Carolina Díaz; Fernando Lozada; Sebastián Yatra; Macarena García
Team of the Year	Streamer of the Year
**Privé (Darian Rojas, Jashlem, Libardo Isaza, Orson Padilla, Naim Darrechi, Ralf)**; Team Ken (Martinez Twins, Boggi, Dayker); Team Fénix (JD Pantoja, Kimberly Loaiza, Kim Shantal, Danny Alfaro, Kevin Achutegui, Alex Flores, Queen Buenrostro); Mansión Lit (Iker Walker, Dany Rodríguez, Carlota Madrigal, Hadassah Tirosh, Manu Barrios, Niko Vives, Charlie López, Fer Solis, Vale Aguima, Chema Gomfie); Diablos (Maria Bottle, Jorge Patiño, Juanpa Villagordoa, Paola Patiño, Jess Salgado); M5 (Ricky Limón, Daniela Arredondo, Ramón Villa, Andres Flores, Karen Torres); Cheli House (Domelipa, Rod Contreras, Mont Pantoja, Ingratax, Edwin Mendozza)	**AuronPlay**; MissaSinfonía; Ari Gameplays; Coscu; WindyGirk; Juan Guarnizo; Sergio Agüero
Celebrity Crush	Hottest Couple
**Macarena Achaga**; Joaquín Bondoni; Harry Styles; Boggi; Hadassah; Billie Eilish; Ester Expósito; Victor Pérez	**Calle & Poché**; Camilo & Evaluna; Zuribeso; Jearian; Lele & Guaynaa; Ilika Cruz & Vane Amador; Nodeli; Jukilop
Best Comedy	Bichota of the Year
**Mario Aguilar**; Paco De Miguel; Backdoor; Herly; Memelas De Orizaba; Se Rentan Cuartos; La Resolana; Borat	**Jimena Jiménez**; Herly; Ana Lago; Nathy Peluso; Karol G; Anitta; Karime Acashore; Jaylin Acashore
MIAW Transformer	MIAW Transformer LGBTIQ+
**Sara Curruchich**	**Jessica Marjane**
