= Latin American Music Awards of 2022 =

7th Annual Latin American Music Awards
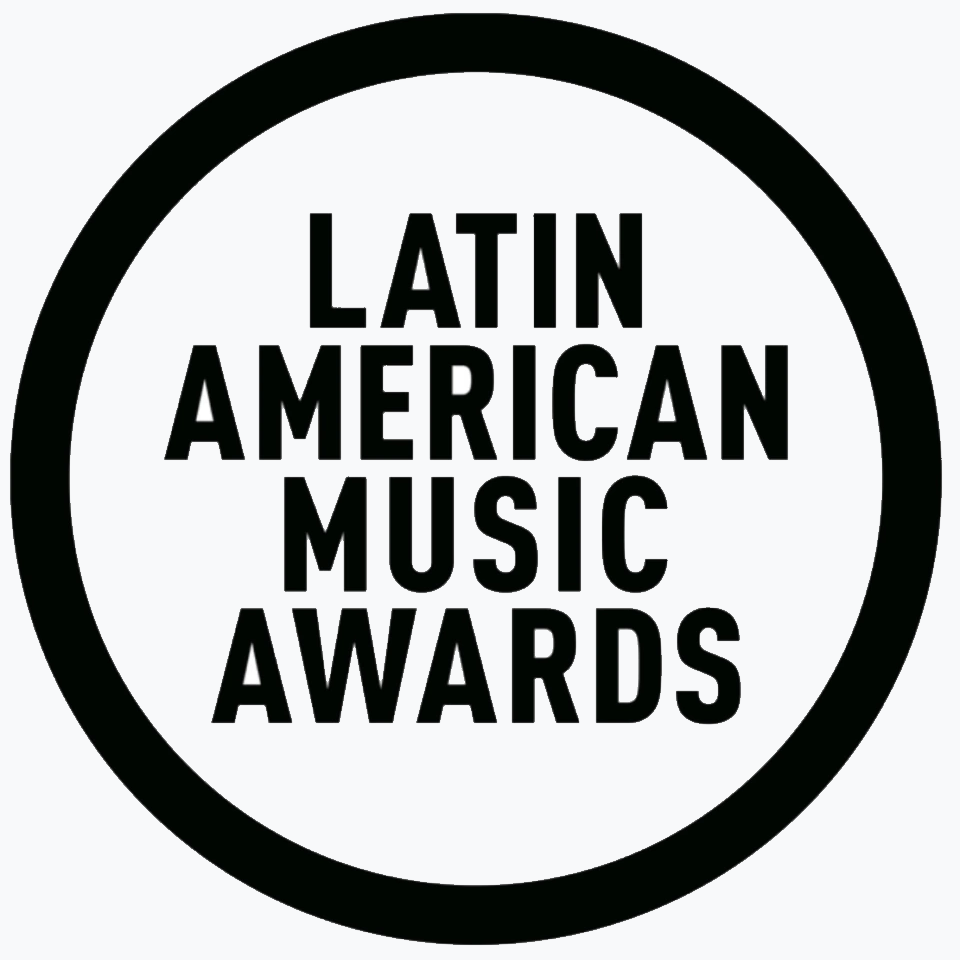
- Date: April 21, 2022
- Location: Michelob Ultra Arena (Las Vegas, Nevada)
- Country: United States
- Most awards: Karol G (6)
- Most nominations: Bad Bunny (10)
- Website: Official site

Television/radio coverage
- Network: Telemundo
- Produced by: MRC Live and Alternative and SOMOS Productions

The 7th Annual Latin American Music Awards were held at the Michelob Ultra Arena in Las Vegas, Nevada. They were broadcast live on Telemundo. Bad Bunny lead the nominations with ten nods, while Karol G was the top winner, with ten nods.

Mexican singer and actress Lupita D’Alessio was honored with the Legend Award, while Mexican singer-songwriter Christian Nodal was recognized with the Extraordinary Evolution Award.

== Performers ==
Artist(s)	Song(s)
Black Eyed Peas; J. Rey Soul; NK; Ozuna; Emilia; Tiago PZK; Lit Killah; CNCO; Prince Royce; Sofía Reyes; Esteman; Farruko; Christian Nodal; Adriel Favela; Gerardo Ortíz; Boza; Calibre 50; Chesca; Chiquis Rivera; Goyo	"Where Is The Love?"
Gloria Trevi	"La recaída"
Jesse & Joy	"Respirar"
Prince Royce & María Becerra	"Te Espero"
Los Ángeles Azules Ft. Sofía Reyes & Esteman	"Esa Parte de Mi"
Goyo	"Otra Noche"
Christian Nodal	Medley: "Probablemente” “Adiós amor” “De los besos que te di” “Ya no somos ni seremos” “Botella tras botella” (with Gera MX)
Calibre 50	"Míranos ahora"
Gerardo Ortíz	"Tranquilito"
Ozuna & Boza	"Deprimida" "Apretaito"
Luis Fonsi	"Dolce"
Chiquis Rivera	"Quiero Amanecer con Alguien"
CNCO	"La Equivocada"
Jhay Cortez	"Dakiti" "Sensual Bebé"
Tiago PZK, Lit Killah & María Becerra	"Entre Nosotros (Remix)"
Farruko	"My Lova"
Reik & María Becerra	"Los Tragos"
Lupita D'Alessio	Medley: “Lo siento mi amor” “Ese Hombre” “Que ganas de no verte más” “Acaríciame" “Mudanzas” “Mentiras”

Nicki Nicole was announced as a performer, but hours before the ceremony, she had to cancel her presentation due to weather conditions that prevented the plane from traveling

== Winners and nominees ==
The nominations were announced on March 3, 2022.

Artist of the Year	New Artist of the Year
Karol G; Bad Bunny; Camilo; Eslabon Armado; Farruko; J Balvin; Jhay Cortez; Myke Towers; Ozuna; Rauw Alejandro	María Becerra; Gera MX; Ivan Cornejo; Jay Wheeler; Kali Uchis; Los Legendarios; Mariah Angeliq
Favorite Female Artist	Favorite Male Artist
Karol G; Kali Uchis; Natti Natasha; Rosalía; Selena Gomez	Bad Bunny; Farruko; J Balvin; Jhay Cortez; Myke Towers; Rauw Alejandro
Song of the Year	Album of the Year
Bad Bunny & Jhay Cortez – “Dakiti”; Farruko – “Pepas”; J Balvin & Skrillex – “In da Getto”; Kali Uchis – “Telepatía”; Rauw Alejandro – “Todo de Ti”	Karol G – KG0516; Bad Bunny – El Último Tour Del Mundo; Eslabon Armado – Corta Venas; Rauw Alejandro – Vice Versa
Favorite Duo or Group	Favorite Pop Artist
Aventura; Grupo Firme; Banda MS de Sergio Lizárraga; Eslabon Armado; La Arrolladora Banda El Limón de René Camacho; Los Dos Carnales	Selena Gomez; Camilo; Enrique Iglesias; Kali Uchis; Luis Fonsi; Sebastián Yatra
Favorite Pop Album	Favorite Pop Song
CNCO – Déjà Vu; Camilo - Mis Manos; Enrique Iglesias – Final (Vol. 1); Piso 21 – El Amor En Los Tiempos Del Perreo; Selena Gomez – Revelación; Tommy Torres – El Playlist de Anoche	Sebastián Yatra feat. Myke Towers – “Pareja del Año”; Kali Uchis – “Telepatía”; Maluma – “Sobrio”; Rauw Alejandro – “Todo de Ti”
Favorite Regional Mexican Artist	Favorite Regional Mexican Duo or Group
Christian Nodal; Carin Leon; El Fantasma; Junior H; Lenin Ramírez	Grupo Firme; Banda MS de Sergio Lizárraga; Calibre 50; Eslabon Armado; Los Ángeles Azules; Los Dos Carnales
Favorite Regional Mexican Song	Favorite Regional Mexican Album
Gera MX & Christian Nodal – “Botella Tras Botella”; Banda MS de Sergio Lizárraga – “La Casita”; Calibre 50 – “A La Antigüita”; Grupo Firme & Carin Leon – “El Tóxico”; La Arrolladora Banda El Limón de René Camacho – “Mi Primer Derrota”	Christian Nodal – ''Ahora''; Banda MS de Sergio Lizárraga – El Trabajo Es La Suerte; Eslabon Armado – Corta Venas; Ivan Cornejo – Alma Vacía; Los Dos Carnales – Al Estilo Rancherón
Favorite Urban Artist	Favorite Urban Album
Karol G; Anuel AA; Bad Bunny; J Balvin; Jhay Cortez; Maluma; Rauw Alejandro	Karol G – KG0516; Bad Bunny – El Último Tour del Mundo; Maluma – Papi Juancho; Rauw Alejandro – Vice Versa
Favorite Urban Song	Favorite Tropical Artist
Bad Bunny & Jhay Cortez – “Dákiti”; Farruko – “Pepas”; J Balvin & Skrillex – “In Da Getto”; Los Legendarios, Wisin & Jhay Cortez – “Fiel”	Romeo Santos; Aventura; Carlos Vives; Marc Anthony; Prince Royce
Favorite Tropical Album	Favorite Tropical Song
El Gran Combo de Puerto Rico – En Cuarentena; Luis Vazquez – Comienzos; Sonora Ponceña – Hegemonía Musical	Aventura & Bad Bunny – “Volví”; Camilo – “Kesi”; Carlos Vives – “Colombia, Mi Encanto”; Daddy Yankee & Marc Anthony – “De Vuelta Pa' la Vuelta”; Marc Anthony – “Pa’lla Voy”; Prince Royce – “Lao' a Lao'’”
Favorite Crossover Artist	Collaboration of the Year
The Weeknd; Khalid; Shawn Mendes; Skrillex	Karol G & Mariah Angeliq – “El Makinon”; Aventura & Bad Bunny – “Volví”; Daddy Yankee & Marc Anthony – “De Vuelta Pa’ La Vuelta”; Gera MX & Christian Nodal – “Botella Tras Botella”; Grupo Firme & Carin Leon – “El Tóxico”; Los Legendarios, Wisin & Jhay Cortez – “Fiel”
Social Artist of the Year	Favorite Tour
Pabllo Vittar; Anitta; Becky G; Camila Cabello; Camilo; Chiquis Rivera; Karol G; Ricky Martin; Sebastián Yatra; Tini	Enrique Iglesias & Ricky Martin; Aventura; Grupo Firme; Los Bukis; Maluma; Marc Anthony
Favorite Video	Viral Song of the Year
Anitta – “Girl from Rio”; Camilo, Evaluna Montaner – “Índigo”; Christina Aguilera, Ozuna – “Santo”; Daddy Yankee – “Problema”; Gerardo Ortiz, Piso 21 – “Fino Licor”; J Balvin – “Lo Que Dios Quiera”; Ozuna – “La Funka”; Pablo Alborán – “Castillos de Arena”; Reik, María Becerra – “Los Tragos”; Sebastián Yatra – “Melancólicos Anónimos”	Nio Garcia, J Balvin & Bad Bunny – “AM (Remix)”; Calibre 50 – “Si Te Pudiera Mentir”; Gera MX & Christian Nodal – “Botella Tras Botella”; Grupo Firme – “Ya Supérame (En Vivo Desde Culiacán, Sinaloa)”; Ivan Cornejo – “Está Dañada”; Kali Uchis – “Telepatía”; Los Legendarios, Wisin & Jhay Cortez – “Fiel”; Sebastián Yatra – “Tacones Rojos”

== Multiple nominations and awards ==
Acts that received multiple nominations
Nominations	Act
10	Bad Bunny
8	Jhay Cortez
7	J Balvin
7	Karol G
7	Rauw Alejandro
6	Camilo
6	Grupo Firme
6	Kali Uchis
5	Aventura
5	Marc Anthony
5	Sebastián Yatra
4	Christian Nodal
4	Eslabon Armado
4	Farruko
4	Gera MX
4	Los Legendarios
4	Maluma
3	Banda Sinaloense MS de Sergio Lizárraga
3	Calibre 50
3	Carin Leon
3	Daddy Yankee
3	Enrique Iglesias
3	Myke Towers
3	Ozuna
3	Selena Gomez
3	Skrillex
3	Wisin
2	Anitta
2	Carlos Vives
2	Ivan Cornejo
2	La Arrolladora Banda El Limón de René Camacho
2	Los Dos Carnales
2	María Becerra
2	Mariah Angeliq
2	Piso 21
2	Prince Royce
2	Ricky Martin

Acts that received multiple awards
Awards	Act
6	Karol G
5	Bad Bunny
2	Aventura
2	Christian Nodal
2	Jhay Cortez

== Special Honor ==
- Legend Award: Lupita D’Alessio
- Extraordinary Evolution Award: Christian Nodal
