= Mentiroso =

Mentiroso may refer to:

- Mentiroso (Enrique Iglesias song), 2002
- Mentiroso (Kenia Os song), 2019

== See also ==
- Mentiroso Lake, a lake in the Pando Department, Bolivia
