= Kenia Os =

Mexican Youtuber and singer (born 1999)

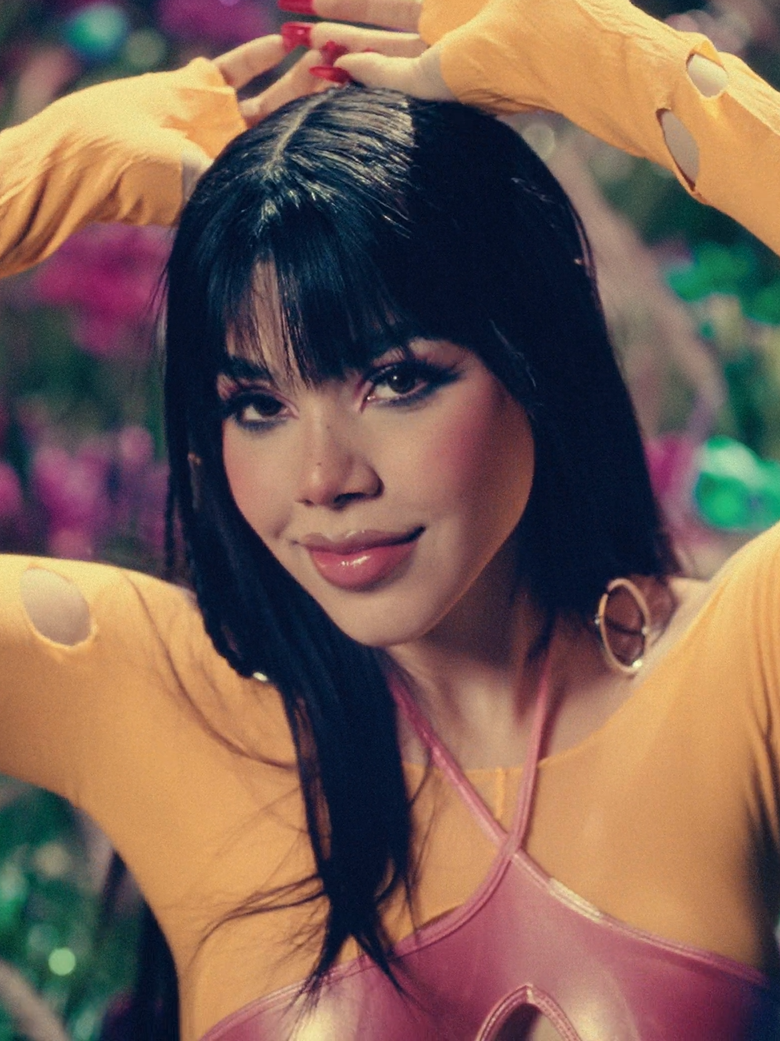
- Kenia Os in 2023
- Born: Kenia Guadalupe Flores Osuna; 15 July 1999 (age 27); Mazatlán, Sinaloa, Mexico
- Occupations: singer; entrepreneur
- Years active: 2018–present
- Musical career
- Genres: Reggaeton; Latin pop
- Works: Discography
- Labels: Lizos; Sony Mexico; 5020
- Website: https://keniaos.com

Kenia Guadalupe Flores Osuna (born 15 July 1999), known professionally as Kenia Os, is a Mexican singer and social media personality. She was a content creator on YouTube with a team of creators where she amassed millions of subscribers, before continuing on her own. She signed with Lizos Music in 2018, releasing her debut single "Por Siempre". After a period as an independent artist, she signed with Sony Music Mexico and released her debut studio album, Cambios de Luna (2022), followed by the successful albums K23 (2023) and Pink Aura (2024).

She has expanded her career into television, co-hosting the 2021 MTV MIAW Awards and appearing on streaming shows such as HBO Max's Bake Off Celebrity: Mexico. Her accolades include seven MTV MIAW Awards, an MTV Europe Music Award, and a Heat Latin Music Award, in addition to a nomination for a Latin Grammy Award for Best Long Form Music Video.

== Career ==
In 2015, she created her first YouTube channel, later joining the Jukilop group. In 2018, she left the group following disagreements in her contract. Due to a previous contract, Os's social networks were deleted because they no longer belonged to her. The controversy and rivalry that would arise among the YouTubers increased her popularity.

== Discography ==
- Cambios de Luna (2022)
- K23 (2022)
- Pink Aura (2024)
- K de karma(2026)

== Filmography ==
=== Television ===
List of television appearances and roles
Title	Year	Role	Network	Notes	Ref.
¡Conecta y Canta!	2021	Judge	Disney+	Season 1	
MTV Millennial Awards 2021	2021	Host	MTV	Television special	
Bake Off Celebrity Mexico	2021	Contestant	HBO Max	Season 1	
The Voice Mexico	2022	Invited	Azteca Uno	Season 4	
The Masked Singer	2022	Invited	Las Estrellas	Season 4	

=== Web ===
List of web appearances and roles
Title	Year	Role	Network	Notes	Ref.
MelanKOs	2021	Herself	Neerme	Live streaming concert that broke the record for the most watched online concert in the history of Ibero-America.	

== Tours ==
- Cambios De Luna Tour (2022)
- K23 Tour (2023)
- Pink Aura Tour (2024)
- K de karma Tour (2026)

== Awards and nominations ==
Award	Year (Note: Indicates the year of ceremony. Each year is linked to the article about the awards held that year, wherever possible.)	Recipient(s) and nominee(s)	Category	Result	Ref.
Eliot Awards	2020	Kenia Os	Beat For Like	Nominated	—
Eliot Awards	2021	Kenia Os	Digital Leader of the Year	Nominated	—
Eliot Awards	2021	Kenia Os	Beat For Like	Nominated	—
Eres Awards	2019	Kenia Os	Favorite Music Revelation	Won	
Heat Latin Music Awards	2021	Kenia Os	Most Promising Act	Nominated	
Heat Latin Music Awards	2022	Kenia Os	Best Artist North Region	Nominated	
Kids' Choice Awards Mexico	2019	Kenia Os	Favorite Comedy YouTuber	Nominated	
Kids' Choice Awards Mexico	2020	Kenia Os	Inspiration of the Year	Won	
Kids' Choice Awards Mexico	2021	Kenia Os	Top Creator	Nominated	
Kids' Choice Awards Mexico	2022	Kenia Os	From Creator to Artist	Won	
Latin Grammy Awards	2023	Universo K23	Best Long Form Music Video	Nominated	
MTV Europe Music Awards	2022	Kenia Os	Best Latin America North Act	Won	
MTV Europe Music Awards	2023	Kenia Os	Best Latin America North Act	Won	
MTV MIAW Awards	2018	Kenia Os	The Newest Face	Nominated	
MTV MIAW Awards	2018	Kenia Os	Styler of the Year	Nominated	
MTV MIAW Awards	2019 (Note: At the same ceremony, Octavio, Os' dog, won the "#INSTAPETS" category.)	Kenia Os	Instastories	Won	
MTV MIAW Awards	2021	Kenia Os	MIAW Icon	Won	
MTV MIAW Awards	2021	Kenia Os	MIAW Stories	Nominated	
MTV MIAW Awards	2021	Kenia Os	Best Fandom	Nominated	
MTV MIAW Awards	2022	Kenia Os	Coreo Crack	Won	
MTV MIAW Awards	2022	Kenia Os	Motomami of the Year	Nominated	
MTV MIAW Awards	2022	Kenia Os	Best Fandom	Won	
MTV MIAW Awards	2022	Kenia Os	Best Mexican Artist	Won	
MTV MIAW Awards	2023	Kenia Os	MIAW Artist	Won	
MTV MIAW Awards	2023	"Malas Decisiones"	Viral Anthem	Won	
MTV MIAW Awards	2023	"Para No Verte Más" (with Thalía)	Music Ship of the Year	Nominated	
Premios Juventud	2023	Kenia Os	The New Generation - Female	Won	
Premios Juventud	2023	Kenia Os	I Want More	Won	
Premios Juventud	2023	Keninis	Best Fandom	Won	
Premios Juventud	2023	"Mi Salida Contigo" (with Ha*Ash)	Girl Power	Nominated	
Premios Juventud	2023	"Malas Decisiones"	Social Dance Challenge	Nominated	
Premios Lo Nuestro	2024	Kenia Os	New Artist of the Year (Female)	Won	
Premios Lo Nuestro	2024	Kenia Os	Pop Female Artist of the Year	Nominated	
Premios Lo Nuestro	2024	"Mi Salida Contigo" (with Ha*Ash)	Pop Song of the Year	Won	
Premios Lo Nuestro	2025	"Jackpot" (with Belinda)	Best Female Combination	Won	
Premios Lo Nuestro	2025	"Tommy & Pamela" (with Peso Pluma)	Pop-Urban Song Of The Year	Won	
Premios Lo Nuestro	2026	"En 4"	Best Female Combination	Pending	
Premios Lo Nuestro	2026	Kenia Os	Pop Female Artist of the Year	Pending	
Rolling Stone en Español Awards	2023	Kenia Os	Voice of the Audience	Nominated	
Socialiteen Awards	2021	Kenia Os	Influencer of the Year	Won	
Socialiteen Awards	2021	Kenia Os	Viral Artist of the Year	Won	
Socialiteen Awards	2021	Kenia Os	New Latin Artist of the Year	Won	
Socialiteen Awards	2021	Kenia Os	Fandom of the Year	Won	
