= Samy Rivers =

Mexican streamer (born 1988)

Rivers
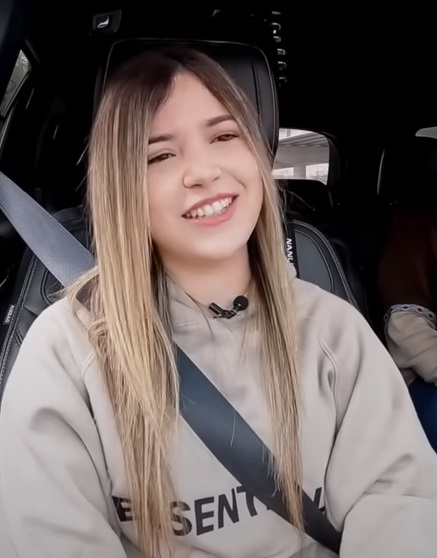
- Rivers in 2023
- Born: Samantha Rivera Treviño; August 20, 1998 (age 28); Monterrey, Nuevo León, Mexico
- Occupations: Online streamer; YouTuber
- Years active: 2020–present

Twitch information
- Channel: rivers_gg
- Genre: Video gaming
- Followers: 6.4 million

YouTube information
- Channel: Rivers
- Genres: Let's Play; Vlog
- Subscribers: 4.23 million
- Views: 573 million
- Last updated: September 8, 2024

Samantha Rivera Treviño (born August 20, 1998), better known as Samy Rivers or simply Rivers, is a Mexican online streamer and YouTuber. In 2023, she became the most viewed female streamer on Twitch worldwide, streaming under the rivers_gg tag.

== Career ==
Rivers began her career in the digital world in 2020 through the Facebook and YouTube platforms, where she shared about video games. Her content reached the goal of achieving one million followers, which led her to be interviewed by various magazines and newspapers and identified as one of the ten best online content creators in Mexico. Her content extends to various social networks such as Twitter, Instagram and TikTok.

Rivers' main platform is Twitch where it has been positioned in the top places since 2022, reaching an average of more than 12,000 viewers with peaks that exceed 75,000 viewers. She is also recognized for being the president of the PIO FC football team of the Kings League.

== Awards and nominations ==
Year	Ceremony	Category	Result	Ref.
2023	MTV MIAW Awards	Streamer of the Year	Won	
2023	Kids' Choice Awards Mexico	Coolest Streamer	Won	
2023	Eliot Awards	Streamer	Nominated	
2023	The Streamer Awards	Best International Streamer	Nominated	
2024	Kids' Choice Awards	Funniest Creator (Latin America)	Nominated	
2026	The Streamer Awards	Best Streamer Collab (Note: Shared with AriGameplays.)	Pending	

== See also ==
- List of most-followed Twitch channels
