= Domelipa =

Mexican influencer and singer (born 2001)

- Reséndez in 2019
- Born: Dominik Elizabeth Reséndez Robledo; 27 August 2001 (age 25); Monterrey, Mexico
- Other name: Dome
- Occupations: Influencer; singer
- Years active: 2018–present

Instagram information
- Page: DOME
- Years active: 2013–present
- Followers: 22.3 million

TikTok information
- Page: DOME
- Years active: 2016–present
- Followers: 75.3 million

YouTube information
- Channel: Domelipa
- Years active: 2018–present
- Subscribers: 7.27 million
- Views: 527 million
- Last updated: 10 October 2026
- Musical career
- Genre: Latin pop
- Instruments: Vocals
- Label: Sony Music Latin

Dominik Elizabeth Reséndez Robledo (born 27 August 2001), known professionally as Domelipa or just Dome (stylized in all caps), is a Mexican influencer and singer. She has more than 75 million followers on TikTok, making her one of the world's most-followed TikTokers. Her debut album, La Del Arroba, was released in 2026.

== Life and career ==
Reséndez was born in Monterrey. She started out posting lip sync videos on Musical.ly. She made her username by combining her first name with the singer Dua Lipa. In 2018, she jumped to TikTok and began to gain a large following as she posted comedy, lifestyle, and dance choreography videos. She launched her YouTube channel later that year. She was studying to become a teacher before dedicating fully to social media.

Reséndez joined the TikTok collective Cheli House in 2020. With the group, she collaborated alongside fellow influencers Rod Contreras, Mont Pantoja, Edwin Mendoza, and Ingratax. She surpassed 25 million TikTok followers by the following year. In 2022, she received the MIAW Icon Award at the MTV MIAW Awards.

Reséndez began a foray into music when she signed with Westwood Entertainment in March 2024. She had been writing songs herself for two years. She made her recording debut in May by featuring on Gabito Ballesteros's "Dolido" from his album The GB. The next month, she released her debut solo single, "La Foto". In July, after signing with Sony Music Latin, she released her second single, "@Ese Vato", featuring Puerto Rican singer Ozuna. She had 75 million TikTok followers by this time, making her the second-most-followed user in Latin America.

Under the new stage name "Dome", Reséndez released her debut album, La Del Arroba, in September 2026.

== Discography ==
=== Studio albums ===
Title	Details
La Del Arroba	Released: September 24, 2026; Label: Sony Music Latin

=== Singles ===
Title	Year	Album
"La Foto"	2024	
"@Ese Vato" (featuring Ozuna)	2024	
"@Audemars" (featuring Omar Montes)	2024	
"XXX"	2025	
"Coronas Pal Despecho"	2026	
"@Fantasma"	2026	La Del Arroba
"@Everest"	2026	La Del Arroba
"@Una Señal" (featuring Bolela)	2026	La Del Arroba
"@Bomba de Humo" (featuring Corina Smith)	2026	La Del Arroba
"@Ojitos" (featuring 3AM)	2026	La Del Arroba

== Awards and nominations ==
Award	Year	Recipient(s) and nominee(s)	Category	Result	Ref.
Kids' Choice Awards Mexico	2021	Domelipa	Creator #ForYou	Won	
Kids' Choice Awards Mexico	2022	Domelipa	Challenger of the Year	Nominated	
Kids' Choice Awards Mexico	2022	Domelipa	Celebrity Crush	Nominated	
Kids' Choice Awards Mexico	2023	Domelipa	Trender of the Year	Nominated	
Kids' Choice Awards Mexico	2023	Domelipa	Celebrity Crush	Nominated	
Kids' Choice Awards Mexico	2024	Domelipa	Celebrity Crush	Nominated	
Kids' Choice Awards Mexico	2024	Domelipa and La Granja del Borrego	The Bob to Your Patrick	Nominated	
MTV MIAW Awards	2021	Domelipa	MIAW Icon	Nominated	
MTV MIAW Awards	2021	Cheli House	Team of the Year	Nominated	
MTV MIAW Awards	2022	Domelipa	MIAW Icon	Won	
MTV MIAW Awards	2022	Domelipa	Coreo Crack	Nominated	
MTV MIAW Awards	2023	Domelipa	Celebrity Crush	Nominated	
MTV MIAW Awards	2023	Domelipa	"La Loba" of the Year	Nominated	
MTV MIAW Awards	2024	Domelipa	Styler GRWM	Nominated	
MTV MIAW Awards	2024	Ian Lucas and Domelipa	Couple Goals	Nominated	
Premios Juventud	2022	Domelipa	Popular Artist/Influencer	Nominated	
