= 2022 MTV MIAW Awards =

Latin American music awards ceremony

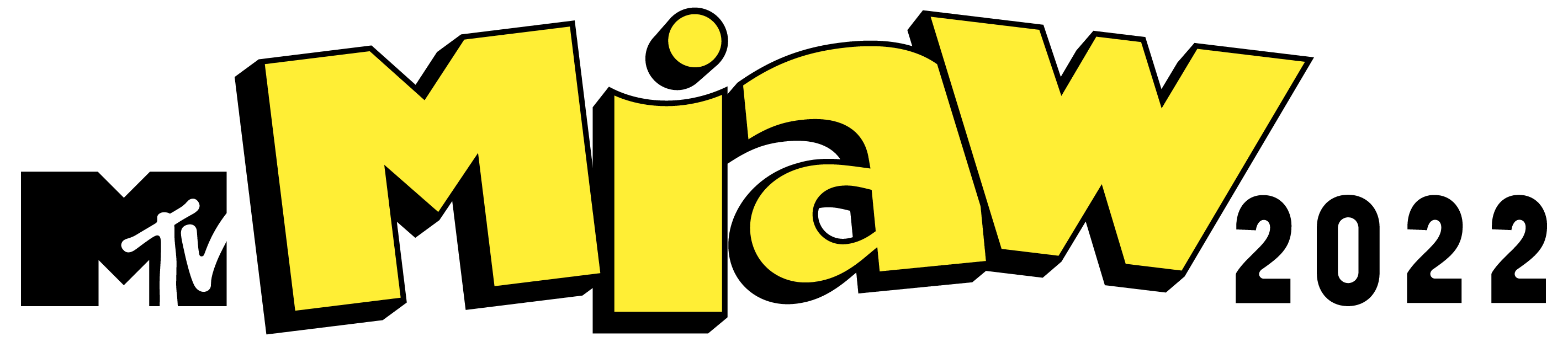
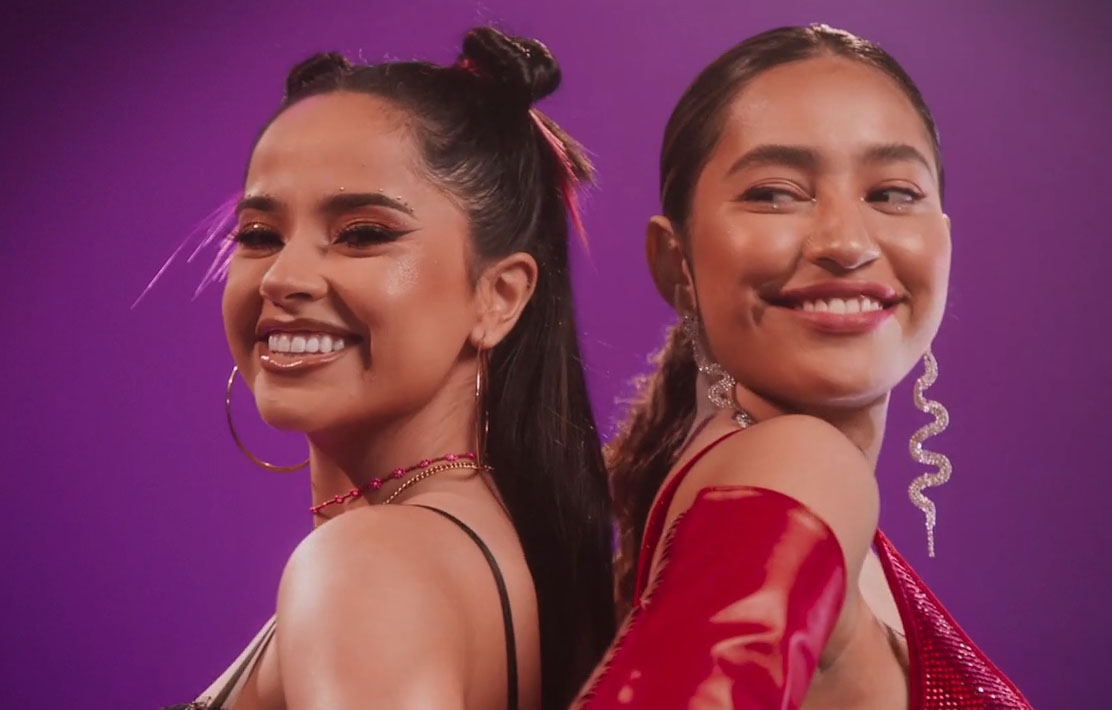
- Gomez and Jimenez at the ceremony promo
- Date: 10 July 2022
- Location: Pepsi Center WTC, Mexico City
- Hosted by: Becky G and Jimena Jiménez

Highlights
- Most wins: Kenia Os (3)
- Most nominations: Rosalía (9)
- Website: miaw.mtvla.com

Television/radio coverage
- Network: MTV; TikTok; Paramount+; Pluto TV; Facebook

The 9th Annual MTV MIAW Awards took place on July 10, 2022, at the Pepsi Center WTC in Mexico City. They were broadcast live by MTV Latin America. The awards celebrated the best of Latin music and the digital world of the millennial generation. The list of nominees were revealed on June 6, 2022. The ceremony was broadcast on MTV, Paramount+, PlutoTV, Facebook and TikTok.

== Performers ==
| Artist(s) | Song(s) | Ref |
|---|---|---|
| Natanael Cano | "Nataaoki" | |
| Becky G and Guaynaa | "Tajin" | |
| Tini | "La Triple T" / "Miénteme" | |
| Moderatto and Danna Paola | "Ser o Parecer" / "Solo Quédate En Silencio" | |
| Manuel Turizo | "La Bachata" | |

== Winners and nominees ==
Winners are listed first and highlighted in bold.

=== Music ===
| MIAW Artist | Mexican Artist |
|---|---|
| **Karol G**; Bad Bunny; Rauw Alejandro; Becky G; Maluma; Rosalía; Sebastián Yatra; Natanael Cano | **Kenia Os**; Alemán; Natanael Cano; Santa Fe Klan; Mario Bautista; Kim Loaiza; Sofía Reyes; Adriel Favela |
| Flow Artist | Argentine Artist |
| **Andy Rivera**; Ryan Castro; Feid; Guaynaa; Manuel Turizo; Eladio Carrión; Danny Ocean; Farina | **Tini**; María Becerra; Emilia; Nicki Nicole; Trueno; Duki; Bizarrap; Tiago PZK; Jey Uso; RackaRacka |
| Best New Artist | K-Pop Domination |
| **Kevin Kaarl**; Santa Fe Klan; Ramón Vega; Joel de León; Blessd; Matt Paris; Bruses; Ingratax | **BTS**; Lisa; Monsta X; NCT; Seventeen; Super Junior; Momoland; Twice |
| Viral Anthem | Global Hit of the Year |
| **"Mamiii" - Becky G and Karol G**; "Problemón" - Rauw Alejandro and Álvaro Díaz; "Fuera del mercado" - Danny Ocean; "Tacones rojos" - Sebastián Yatra; "Lo Siento BB:/" - Tainy, Bad Bunny and Julieta Venegas; "Saoko" - Rosalía; "Plan A" - Paulo Londra; "Envolver" – Anitta | **"My Universe" - Coldplay and BTS**; "As It Was" - Harry Styles; "Industry Baby" - Lil Nas X with Jack Harlow; "abcdefu" - Gayle; "Money" - Lisa; "All Too Well" - Taylor Swift; "Cold Heart (Pnau remix)" - Elton John and Dua Lipa; "Woman" - Doja Cat |
| Music - Ship of the Year | Video of the Year |
| **"Después de las 12" - Ovi and Kim Loaiza**; "La fama" - Rosalía and The Weeknd; "Cada quién" - Maluma and Grupo Firme; "BZRP Music Sessions #49" - Bizarrap and Residente; "X última vez" - Daddy Yankee and Bad Bunny; "Sigue" - J Balvin and Ed Sheeran; "Marte" - Sofía Reyes and María Becerra; "Nataaoki" - Natanael Cano and Steve Aoki | **"00:00" - Siddhartha**; "Saoko" - Rosalía; "Mar y tierra" - Santa Fe Klan; "Inevitable" - Camilo Séptimo; "Tocando tierra / Categoría 5" - Alemán; "Linda" - Tokischa and Rosalía; "This Is Not America" - Residente with Ibeyi; "Ateo" - C. Tangana and Nathy Peluso |

=== Digital ===
| MIAW Icon | Creator of the Year |
|---|---|
| **Domelipa**; Iamferv; Martínez Twins; Jimena Jiménez; Daniela Rodrice; Darian Rojas; Kunno; Kimberly Loaiza | **JD Pantoja**; Nicole Amado; Brianda Deyanara; Ignacia Antonia; Ralf; Ricky Limón; Kevlex; Mau López |
| Global Creator with Flow | Trend Guru |
| **Nils Kuesel**; Khaby Lame; Addison Rae; Spencer X; Anitta; Boggi; Beast; Loren Gray; Jey Uso; Jimmy Uso; RackaRacka | **Pongámoslo a Prueba**; Javier Ibarreche; Paco de Miguel; RobeGrill; Alex Tienda; Ale Agualló; Priscy Escoto; Alonso Arriaga |
| New School Favorite | MIAWudio of the Year |
| **Sonrixs**; Karen Barrera; Dani Arredondo; Sofi Mata; Ma Regis; Esen Alva; Soy Stivex; Jair Sánchez | **Muy pegriloso - Kimberly la más preciosa**; "Te robo la herencia" - Daniela Rodrice; "Abcdefg..." - Rosalía; "OMG solo con 20 pesos" - Kimberly Loaiza; "Te gusta el tequila" - Álvaro Álvares; "No es diario" - Martha Debayle; "Bendiciones la Pepo" - Ternura68; "Mi nombre es descaro" - Karime Pindter |
| Coreo Crack | Celebrity Crush |
| **Kenia Os**; Domelipa; Its Mitch; Nicole García; Augusto Giménez; Rod Contreras; Eddie Schobert; Kunno | **Danna Paola**; León Leiden; Manu Ríos; Jashlem; Jorge Chacón; Sofía Reyes; Macarena Achaga; Sebastián Yatra |
| Styler of the Year | Fit Influencer |
| **Bad Bunny**; Legna Hernández; Franco Masini; Noah Beck; María Bottle; Azul Guaita; Humbe; Darian Rojas | **Cristiano Ronaldo**; Bárbara de Regil; Issa Vegas; Fernando Lozada; Mariano Razo; Ernesto Cázares; Antonieta Gaxiola; Simone Biles |
| Lipsync Master | Crazy Colabs |
| **Mont Pantoja**; Karen Barrera; Jlynsky23; Carlos Feria; Poncho de Nigris; Livia Brito; Soybans; Aaron Mercury | **Iamferv and James Charles**; Ibai Llanos, Juan Guarnizo and AuronPlay; RobeGrill and Rosalía; Bella Poarch and Anitta; Kevlex, Augusto Giménez and Elio Leiros; Kunno and Poncho de Nigris; Carol Castro, Fernanda Duran and Sofía Mata |
| Fandom | Flames Couple |
| **Keninis - Kenia Os**; Tribu - Camilo; Lisa Oppa - Lisa; Forever Yatra - Sebastián Yatra; Los Cotorros - La Cotorrisa; Lovers - Dua Lipa; EXO L - EXO; Jukis - JD Pantoja and Kim Loaiza | **Kevlex and Ignacia Antonia**; Juanpa Villagordoa and Jorge Patiño; Nabile and Fercha; Danna Paola and Alex Hoyer; Lele Pons and Guaynaa; Rauw Alejandro and Rosalía; Tom Holland and Zendaya; JuanSGuarnizo and Ari Gameplays |
| Viral Bomb | Ridiculous of the Year |
| **Envolver challenge**; Residente vs. J Balvin; Bicycle of Alfredo Adame; "A mi no me gusta a mi me encanta"; "Unos pedillos"; Katy viral hit | **Will Smith's slap**; Karol G's fall; "Vicente Fernández could not receive his award"; Adela Micha says Silvia Pinal will die; Influencers break the law; "Vendiendo depas" |
| Podcast Boss | Comedy Boss |
| **Calle and Poché - Bilateral**; Slobotsky and Ricardo Pérez - La Cotorrisa; Juanpa Zurita - No hagas lo fácil; Karla Díaz-Leal Arreguín - Pinky Promise; Roberto Martínez – Creativo | **Franco Escamilla**; Jair Sánchez; Harina, la serie; La Cotorrisa; LOL; Stephany Leal; Ren Pc; Backdoor |
| Motomami of the Year | Streamer of the Year |
| **Daniela Rodrice**; Rosalía; Selene; Tokischa; María Becerra; Karime Pindter; Anitta; Kenia Os | **ElMariana**; Juan Guarnizo; Ibai Llanos; Elded; Ari Gameplays; Fercha; Staryuuki |
| Gamer Obsession | E-Sports Team |
| **TortillaLand**; Disney Mirrorverse; Elden Ring; Brawl Stars; Fortnite; Pokémon Arceus; Halo Infinite | **KOI**; G2; Rainbow7; Isurus Gaming; 9Z; Pittsburgh Knights; MAD Lions; Giants Gaming |

=== Entertainment ===
| Reality of the Year | Royal Reality |
|---|---|
| **La Venganza de los Ex**; Resistiré; Acapulco Shore; Exatlón All Stars; La Más Draga; La casa de los famosos | **Manelyk**; Luis "Potro" Caballero; Kim Shantal; Eduardo "Chile" Miranda; David "La Bestia" Juárez; Karime Pindter; Ana Lago; C-Pher |
| Killer Series | Movie for the Win |
| **Euphoria**; Halo; Squid Game; Obi-Wan Kenobi; Rebelde; Élite; Moon Knight; Harina, el teniente vs. el cancelador | **Spider-Man: No Way Home**; Doctor Strange in the Multiverse of Madness; The Batman; The Tinder Swindler; Through My Window; Dune; Anonymously Yours; Top Gun: Maverick |
