= Ingratax =

Mexican singer and influencer (born c. 2000)

- Born: Ingrid Fernanda Enríquez Guillén; February 4, 2000 (age 26); Chihuahua, Mexico
- Occupations: Singer; songwriter
- Years active: 2021–present

Ingrid Fernanda Enríquez Guillén (born February 4, 2000), known professionally as Ingratax, is a Mexican singer and songwriter. She released her debut single "París" in July 2021, and launched her debut studio album KITSUNE in November 2022.

== Early life and career ==
Ingrid Fernanda Enríquez Guillén was born on February 4, 2000, in Chihuahua, Mexico. When she was five years old, her grandmother Yolanda began teaching her the guitar and piano; since then she started liking music and started competing in musical competitions in Mexico. In 2021, she had the opportunity to do music with Room 28 under the label LIZOS MUSIC.

Enríquez joined TikTok in 2017 and often posts duets. She has 15.5 million followers. She was a member of the Team Cheli house with the influencers Domelipa and Mont Pantoja. Enríquez released her debut single, "París" in early July 2021. Billboard described the sad pop track as melancholic. The melody was written by Resko Fozia after engaging in a relationship with the latter. Enríquez was nominated at the 2021 MTV Millennial Awards in the favorite new school category. Ingratax is signed to Sergio Lizárraga's indie label, Room 28. In mid-July 2021, "París" went viral on TikTok and charted at No. 36 on the Hot Latin Songs chart, No. 37 on the Billboard Global Excl. U.S. chart and No. 63 on the Billboard Global 200. The music video has over 100 million views on YouTube and over 400 million streams on Spotify.

== Discography ==
List of singles as lead artist, with selected chart positions, showing year released and album name
| Title | Year | Peak chart positions | | | | | | | | | Certifications | Album |
| Title | Year | MEX Airplay | ARG | PAR | RD | SPA | URU | US Latin | US Latin Pop | WW | Certifications | Album |
|---|---|---|---|---|---|---|---|---|---|---|---|---|
| "París" | 2021 | 24 | 27 | 7 | 20 | 9 | 16 | 36 | 13 | 63 | PROMUSICAE: 2× Platinum | |
| "Las de Octubre" | 2021 | — | — | — | — | — | — | — | — | — | | |
| "Noche en LA" (with Sael) | 2022 | — | — | — | — | — | — | — | — | — | | |
| "Sin Ropa" (with Dylan Fuentes) | 2022 | — | — | — | — | — | — | — | — | — | | |
| "Apagaita" | 2022 | — | — | — | — | — | — | — | — | — | | |
| "Necesito un Break de Tanta Pendejad*" (with DAAZ) | 2022 | — | — | — | — | — | — | — | — | — | | KITSUNE |
| "Un Chingazo" (with Banda MS) | 2022 | — | — | — | — | — | — | — | — | — | | |
| "Medio Crazy (Remix)" (with Nobeat and Khea featuring Rusherking, FMK and Juhn) | 2022 | — | — | — | — | — | — | — | — | — | | |
