= Mentiroso (Kenia Os song) =

2019 single by Kenia Os

Single by Kenia Os
- English title: Liar
- Released: July 5, 2019
- Genre: pop
- Length: 2:28
- Label: Lizos Music
- Songwriters: 6IXXX, Jesús Caballero & Kenia Os
- Producer: Omar Varela

Kenia Os singles chronology
| "Energía" (2019) | "Mentiroso" (2019) | "Delito" (2019) |

Music video
- "Mentiroso" on YouTube

"Mentiroso" is a song by Mexican youtuber and singer Kenia Os. It was released as an standalone single by Lizos Music on July 5, 2019. Its original release date was July 7, 2019, but Os challenged fans through a post on social media to reach 900k likes on that post and it would be released on July 5, which happened. Os co-wrote the song with 6IXXX and Jesus Caballero and was produced by Omar Varela.

== Background ==
On July 5, 2019, Os uploaded to her Instagram account a post in which she was seen in black lingerie and surrounded by models with the caption: "Mentiroso comes out this Sunday, but if this photo reaches 900k likes we release it already". Immediately, it ignited the social networks and in a short time it had already surpassed the mark, so that same day the video clip of the song came out. Currently, Os' post has more than 1.2 million likes on Instagram.

== Controversy ==
The music video for "Mentiroso" was released on July 5, 2019. The video was starting to take off in popularity, it was positioned at #1 trending on YouTube worldwide and in around its first 24 hours, it managed to reach the 4.4 million views mark. Just when what could be the biggest hit of Os' career so far was looming, it was cut short, as Os' then record label blocked the music video of the song worldwide, claiming that it infringed on copyrights.

Immediately after the video was removed from the YouTube platform, netizens and Os' fandom, began bombarding Os with questions as to why the video was removed. Os limited herself to making a statement through her Instagram stories, where, in a short voice and crying, she stated:

"Mentiroso is no longer available on YouTube and probably won't be available on Spotify because of people who are so rude and so stupid, I swear. The worst thing is that they are people that I can't mention for legal reasons, but they are people that have the worst company in the world, the company that steals the most, that don't even do anything".

— Kenia Os on her Instagram Stories.

Days later, the music video for "Mentiroso" appeared again on Os' music channel. Os was forced to clarify the rumors surrounding the video's removal and the controversy with her record label at the time, so she uploaded a video explaining everything that happened. (Note: This video is no longer available on her YouTube channel.) In the end, it was all a misunderstanding due to a lack of communication between her and the label's management, because according to her, the video was scheduled to be released on the label's official channel, not hers, and in her adrenaline and excitement to show her work to her fans, she got involved in this controversy.
