= Ari Gameplays =

Mexican Internet personality, and glamour model (born 1998)

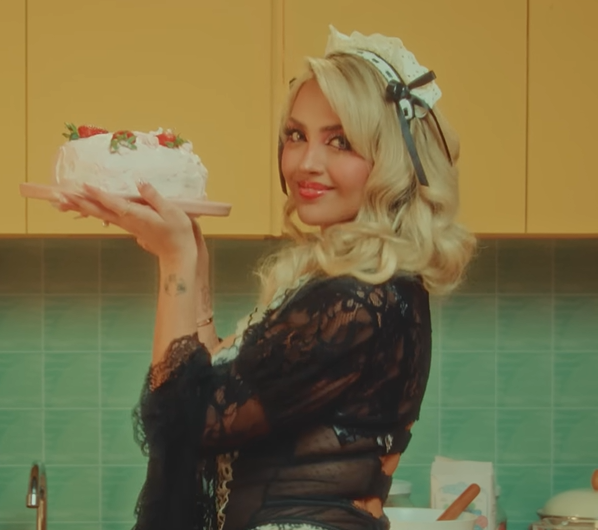
- Ari Gameplays in her music video Wifey
- Born: Abril Abdamari Garza Alonso; February 28, 1998 (age 28); Monterrey, Nuevo León, Mexico
- Education: Communication sciences (Autonomous University of Nuevo León; not completed)
- Occupations: Internet celebrity; streamer; YouTuber; TikToker; glamour model; cosplayer
- Years active: 2016–present
- Spouse: Juan Guarnizo (m. 2019; div. 2024)

TikTok information
- Page: arigameplays
- Followers: 26.1 million

Twitch information
- Channel: AriGameplays
- Genre: Let's Play
- Followers: 6.8 million

YouTube information
- Channels: Ari Gameplays; ARI
- Years active: 2014–present
- Genres: Let's Play; Vlog
- Subscribers: 4.17 million
- Views: 126 million
- Last updated: 24 February 2024

Abril Abdamari Garza Alonso (born February 28, 1998), known online as Ari Gameplays, is a Mexican Internet personality and online streamer. She is the second most-followed female streamer on Twitch, with seven million followers, as well as the 140th most-followed user on TikTok.

== Early life ==
Garza was born in Monterrey, Nuevo León. From an early age she became interested in video games, while studying communication sciences at the Autonomous University of Nuevo León, from which she dropped out due to her success in social networks.

== Career ==
On July 23, 2014, Garza uploaded her first video to YouTube. Initially, she uploaded tutorials and content of female interest. She subsequently chose to dedicate herself to vlogs and Let's Plays. The video games with which she had the most reach on that platform were Minecraft, Grand Theft Auto V, Fortnite, Overwatch and Planet Coaster. Later on February 17, 2019, she started her secondary YouTube channel, which is active from time to time.

In 2016, she started streaming on Twitch, where she managed to position herself as the second most followed female streamer, with around 1.35 million. In June 2018 she participated in a Fortnite Battle Royale tournament hosted by El Rubius at Gamergy 2018. Between May 18 and 19, 2019 she was invited to the Mexican festival Open.GG.

In January 2019, she became involved in a controversy with the Panamanian streamer Windy Girk, since she accused her of "doing stream sniping" to harm her on a Fortnite server in which they had coincided. In March 2021, Windy Girk accused her again of "using bots to report her social media", deleting her posts, videos, and streams, according to her.

In September 2019, she was a luxury guest at Liga VIVA E-Sports Dota 2 tournament in La Paz, Bolivia. In September 2020, after suffering a ban on Twitch, she migrated to Facebook Gaming. In August 2021, she participated in Tortillaland, a Minecraft content series hosted by AuronPlay. On September 10, 2021, she returned to Twitch.

In April 2022, he participated in the Cero Albañiles construction-free Fortnite content series, hosted by TheGrefg. In June 2022, she was invited to the La Velada del Año 2 boxing event hosted by Ibai Llanos, where she became champion. That same month she also presented a limited clothing collection together with El Rubius, under the name of MadKat X Ari Gameplays, and appeared in the third edition of the Dame la Pasta Twitch event, hosted by Ibai Llanos. In July 2022, she launched her own clothing collection in collaboration with Shein company. In August 2022, she participated in Tortillaland 2 sequel. In October 2022, she was announced as the face of Razer's Kraken Kitty V2 Pro headset.

In April 2025, she made her musical debut under the musical alter ego Aria Bela, and released her first single, Pilates.

== Personal life ==
On October 5, 2019, she married Colombian streamer Juan Sebastián "JuanSGuarnizo". On 18 September 2024, the couple announced their divorce via a live stream on the Twitch platform.

== Awards and nominations ==
Year	Ceremony	Category	Nominee	Result	Ref.
2018	Eliot Awards	Gamer	Ari Gameplays	Nominated	
2019	7th MTV Millennial Awards	Streamer of the Year	Ari Gameplays	Nominated	
2021	8th MTV Millennial Awards	Streamer of the Year	Ari Gameplays	Nominated	
2022	9th MTV Millennial Awards	Flames Couple	JuanSGuarnizo and Ari Gameplays	Nominated	
2022	9th MTV Millennial Awards	Streamer of the Year	Ari Gameplays	Nominated	
2022	Eliot Awards	Best Engager	Ari Gameplays	Nominated	
2022	Equinox LATAM Game Awards	Best Content Creator	Ari Gameplays	Won	
2026	The Streamer Awards	Best Streamed Collab	Ari Gameplays and Rivers_GG	Pending	
