= En 4 =

2025 single by Kenia OS and Anitta

Single by Kenia OS and Anitta
- Language: Spanish
- Released: 17 April 2025
- Genre: Reggaeton, Brazilian funk, Latin pop
- Length: 3:06
- Label: Sony Music
- Songwriters: Jorge Milliano; Kenia Guadalupe Flores Osuna; Larissa de Macedo Machado; Mario Alberto Caceres; Mechi Pieretti; Samantha Cámara
- Producers: Jorge Milliano; Mario Cáceres

Kenia OS singles chronology
"Arruiname La Vida" (2025)	"En 4" (2025)	"Bate" (2025)

Anitta singles chronology
"Bota um Funk" (2025)	"En 4" (2025)	"Conjuntão de Time" (2025)

Music video
- "En 4" on YouTube

"En 4" is a collaborative song between Mexican singer Kenia OS and Brazilian singer Anitta, released on April 17, 2025, by Sony Music Mexico as a standalone single. It was the first official musical partnership between the two artists.

== Composition and lyrics ==
"En 4" blends reggaeton, funk carioca, and Latin pop beats, featuring a sound tailored for perreo. The production used artificial intelligence algorithms to create the rhythmic and harmonic foundation, as highlighted in promotional teasers on social media that emphasized the song’s innovative nature. The lyrics, filled with sensual innuendos and verses of female empowerment, popularize the expression “perreíto,” inviting listeners to “ponerte ahí, en cuatro” (“get on all fours”), and include dance-driven choruses.

“Papi, ponte ahí, en el acto

Serás mi perrito por un rato

Ponme un perreíto y te parto

Ponme un perreíto y te parto”

== Background and release ==
On April 8, 2025, Kenia OS and Anitta announced the release date of "En 4" through social media posts, including a tweet from Sony Music México confirming that the single would drop on April 17 at 6:00 p.m. (Mexico time). However, the collaboration had deep roots: the artists had connected back in 2021 when Anitta invited Kenia OS to join the promotion of her single “Loco” in Aspen, Colorado. They later reunited at events like the Pandora Charms Festival Concert in 2024 and in the music video for Shakira’s “Soltera”.

== Music video ==
The official music video for "En 4" premiered simultaneously with the single on Sony Music México’s YouTube channel on April 17, 2025. Directed by the label’s in-house team, the video features highly provocative visuals, with the artists posing together in scenes that were even censored in teasers for including nudity and sensual kisses.

== Commercial performance ==
Shortly after its release, "En 4" appeared on viral playlists on Spotify, gaining over 7,000 saves on the “Hits Viral” playlist within just a few days. The single also trended in both Mexico and Brazil, boosted by livestreams and watch parties organized by fans on social media.

== Credits ==
- Kenia OS – lead vocals
- Anitta – lead vocals

== Release history ==
Region	Date	Format	Label
Global	April 17, 2025	Digital download; streaming	Sony Music México
