= 2019 MTV MIAW Awards =

Annual Latin American music awards 2019

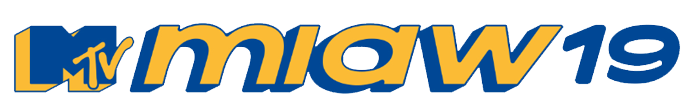
- MTV MIAW 2019 logo
- Date: 23 June
- Location: Palacio de los Deportes, Mexico City
- Hosted by: Luis Gerardo Méndez, Calle and Poché
- Website: miaw.mtvla.com

Television/radio coverage
- Network: MTV Latin America

The 7th Annual MTV MIAW Awards took place on June 23, 2019, at the Palacio de los Deportes in Mexico City. It was broadcast live by MTV Latin America. The awards celebrated the best of Latin music and the digital world of the millennial generation. The list of nominees were revealed on May 6, 2019. Leading the list of nominees were J Balvin, Bad Bunny and Paulo Londra with five nominations each and Anitta with three nominations under her belt.

== Hosts ==
- Luis Gerardo Méndez
- Calle & Poché

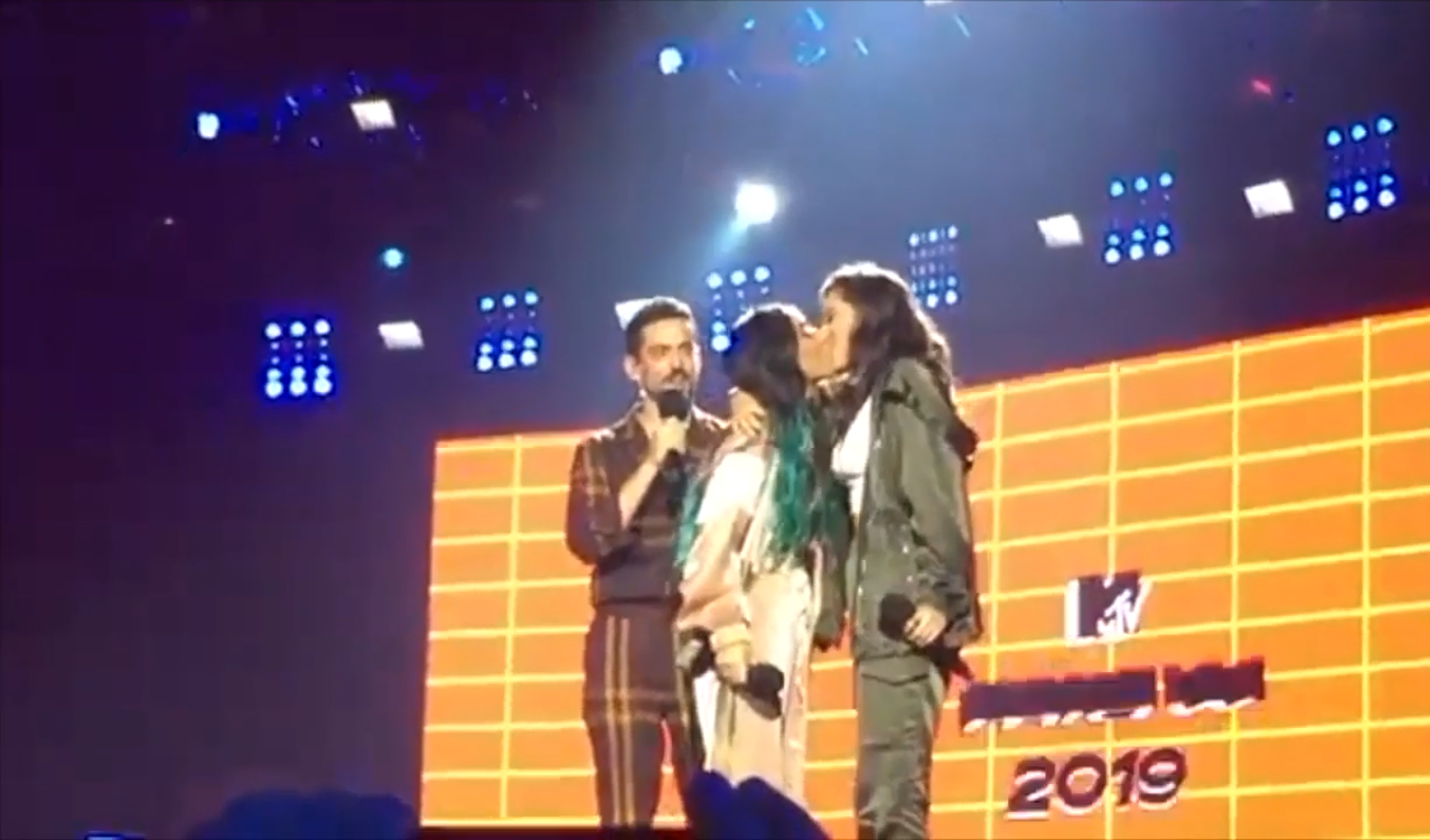
Luis Gerardo Méndez with Calle and Poché at the 2019 MTV Millennial Awards stage

== Performers ==
- Karol G - "Punto G" and "Mi Cama"
- Ed Maverick
- Piso 21
- Mario Bautista
- Aléman
- Halsey - "Without Me" and "Nightmare"
- Bad Bunny - "Callaíta", "Se Estuviésemos Juntos" and "Ni Bien Ni Mal"

== Nominees ==
- Winners are highlighted in **boldface**.

=== ICON MIAW ===
- **Calle y Poché**
- Pautips
- JD Pantoja
- Lizbeth Rodríguez
- Lele Pons
- La Divaza
- Kimberly Loaiza
- Luisito Comunica

=== Artist miaw ===
- **Bad Bunny**
- Rosalía
- J Balvin
- Maluma
- Becky G
- Ozuna
- Reik
- Sebastián Yatra

=== Explosion k-pop ===
- Blackpink
- **BTS**
- EXO
- GOT7
- Ikon
- Red Velvet
- Super Junior
- Twice

=== UP WOMEN! ===
- Mon Laferte
- Yalitza Aparicio
- Alexa Moreno
- Rosalía
- **YosStop**
- Viko Volkóva

=== HIT GLOBAL ===
- Ariana Grande – Thank U, Next
- **Billie Eilish – Bad Guy**
- Cardi B, Bad Bunny, & J Balvin – I Like It
- Halsey – Without Me
- Jonas Brothers – Sucker
- Lady Gaga & Bradley Cooper – Shallow
- Marshmello Feat. Bastille – Happier
- Silk City & Dua Lipa p. Diplo & Mark Ronson – Electricity

=== Hit of the year ===
- Anuel AA & Karol G – Secreto
- Bad Bunny Feat. Drake – Mia
- Daddy Yankee Feat. Snow – Con Calma
- Maluma – Mala Mia
- Ozuna – Baila Baila Baila
- **Paulo Londra – Adán y Eva**
- Pedro Capó & Farruko – Calma (Remix)
- Reik Feat. Maluma – Amigos con Derechos

=== Video of the year ===
- Babasónicos – La Pregunta
- Javiera Mena – Mirror
- Juanes – Pa Inside
- **Mon Laferte – El Beso**
- Rosalía – Pienso En Tu Mirá
- Ximena Sariñana – Si Tü Te Vas

=== Artist + chingon Mexico ===
- Café Tacvba – #MTVLACHINGONTACVBA
- **Jesse & Joy – #MTVLACHINGONJESSEJOY**
- Mon Laferte – #MTVLACHINGONMON
- Reik – #MTVLACHINGONREIK
- Sofía Reyes – #MTVLACHINGONREYES
- Ximena Sariñana – #MTVLACHINGONSARINANA

=== Artist + duro Colombia ===
- J Balvin – #MTVLADUROBALVIN
- Karol G – #MTVLADUROKAROL
- Maluma – #MTVLADUROMALUMA
- Manuel Turizo – #MTVLADUROTURIZO
- Floor 21 – # MTVLADUROPISO21
- **Sebastián Yatra – #MTVLADUROYATRA**

=== Artist + flama Argentina ===
- Duki – #MTVLAFLAMADUKI
- **Lali – #MTVLAFLAMALALI**
- The Authentic Decadents – #MTVLAFLAMADECADENTES
- Neo Pistea – #MTVLAFLAMAPISTEA
- Paulo Londra – #MTVLAFLAMALONDRA
- Tini – #MTVLAFLAMATINI

=== Bromance of the year ===
- Jawy & Tadeo – #MTVLABROJAWYTADEO
- **JD Pantoja & Supertrucha – #MTVLABROPANSUPER**
- Mario Ruiz & Juanpa Zurita – #MTVLABROMARIOZURITA
- Ami Rodríguez & Javi Ramírez – #MTVLABROAMIJAVI
- Mau & Ricky – #MTVLABROMAURICKY
- Berth Oh & Luisito Comunica – #MTVLABROLUISBERTH
- Alex Caniggia & Fritanga – #MTVLABROALEXFRITANGA

=== Risadictos ===
- Backdoor – #MTVLARISABACKDOOR
- Golden Scorpion – #MTVLARISAESCORPION
- Que Parió – #MTVLARISAQUEPARIO
- **Mario Aguilar – #MTVLARISAAGUILAR**
- I Summarize It So Nomás – #MTVLARISARESUMO
- The Podcast of Alex Fernández – #MTVLARISAFERNANDEZ

=== Reality of the year ===
- **Acapulco Shore 6 – #MTVLAREALITYACASHORE**
- I will resist – #MTVLAREALITYRESISTIRE
- Nailed It! Mexico – #MTVLAREALITYNAILEDIT
- To Order With Marie Kondo – #MTVLAREALITYKONDO
- RuPaul's Drag Race 11 – #MTVLAREALITYDRAGRACE

=== Killer series ===
- Game Of Thrones 8 – #MTVLASERIEGOT
- You – #MTVLASERIEYOU
- **Elite – #MTVLASERIEELITE**
- Hanna – #MTVLASERIEHANNA
- The Handmaid's Tale – #MTVLASERIEHANDMAIDS

=== Streamer of the year ===
- WindyGirk – #MTVLASTREAMERWINDY
- Ari Gameplays – #MTVLASTREAMERARI
- Fernanfloo – #MTVLASTREAMERFERNANFLOO
- **Fang8712 – #MTVLASTREAMERFang8712**
- Coscu – #MTVLASTREAMERCOSCU

=== Couple in flames ===
- Aristemo – #MTVLAPAREJAARISTEMO
- **Juliantina – #MTVLAPAREJAJULIANTINA**
- Rio & Tokyo – Money Heist – #MTVLAPAREJARIOTOKIO
- Marina & Nano – Elite – #MTVLAPAREJAMARINANO

=== #instacrush ===
- Sebastián Yatra – #MTVLACRUSHYATRA
- Mane – #MTVLACRUSHMANE
- **Danny Alfaro – #MTVLACRUSHALFARO**
- David Allegre – #MTVLACRUSHALLEGRE
- Brianda Deyanara – #MTVLACRUSHBRIANDA
- Luis Gerardo Méndez – #MTVLACRUSHMENDEZ
- Paulo Londra – #MTVLACRUSHLONDRA
- Manuel Turizo – #MTVLACRUSHTURIZO

=== #INSTAPETS ===
- **Octavio from Kenia Os – #MTVLAPETSOCTAVIO**
- Puca by Juanpa Zurita – #MTVLAPETSPUCA
- Mailo by Dhasia Wezka – #MTVLAPETSMAILO
- Dogs Hoffman by YosStop – #MTVLAPETSHOFFMAN
- Piggy Smallz by Ariana Grande – #MTVLAPETSPIGGY
- Miss Asia by Lady Gaga – #MTVLAPETSASIA

=== Instastories ===
- Dhasia Wezka – #MTVLASTORIESDHASIA
- **Kenia Os – #MTVLASTORIESKENIA**
- Anitta – #MTVLASTORIESANITTA
- Alex Casas – #MTVLASTORIESCASAS
- Kimberly Loaiza – #MTVLASTORIESKIMBERLY
- Sebastian Villalobos —#MTVLASTORIESVILLALOBOS
- Sebastián Yatra – #MTVLASTORIESYATRA
- La Divaza – #MTVLASTORIESLADIVAZA

=== Fandom of the year ===
- BTS Army – #MTVLAFANDOMBTSARMY
- Arianators – #MTVLAFANDOMARIANATORS
- Aristemo Fans – #MTVLAFANDOMARISTEMOFANS
- **Juliantina Fans – #MTVLAFANDOMJULIANTINAFANS**
- Super Junior ELF – #MTVLAFANDOMSUPERJUNIORELF
- Selenators – #MTVLAFANDOMSELENATORS

=== Influence + fresca ===
- Daniela Legarda – #MTVLAINFLULEGARDA
- Gonzok – #MTVLAINFLUGONZOK
- Ana VBon – #MTVLAINFLUVBON
- **Andrea Zúñiga – #MTVLAINFLUZUNIGA**
- Supertrucha – #MTVLAINFLUSUPERTRUCHA
- Pedrito VM – #MTVLAINFLUPEDRITO
- Killadamente – #MTVLAINFLUKILLADAMENTE

=== Ridiculo of the year ===
- Galilea Montijo "Roma" – #MTVLARIDICULOGALILEA
- Belinda Albureada – #MTVLARIDICULOBELINDA
- Dress by Angelique Boyer – #MTVLARIDICULOVESTIDOBOYER
- Sergio Goyri against Yalitza – #MTVLARIDICULOSERGIOGOYRI
- **Cardi B vs. Nicki Minaj – #MTVLARIDICULOCARDIMINAJ**

=== VIRAL PUMP ===
- **Exposing Cheaters – #MTVLABOMBAINFIELES**
- Ayuwoki – #MTVLABOMBAAYUWOKI
- 10 Years Challenge – # MTVLABOMBA10YEARS
- Old Lesbian – #MTVLABOMBAVIEJOLESBIANO
- Do you hear me, hear me, feel me? – #MTVLABOMBAMEESCUCHAN
- Chimuelo – #MTVLABOMBACHIMUELO
- Milhouse Challenge – #MTVLABOMBAMILHOUSE
- Chi Cheñol – #MTVLABOMBACHICHENOL

=== Global instagramer ===
- Jacob Levitz– #MTVLAINSTAGLJacobLevitz
- Ariana Grande – #MTVLAINSTAGLARIANA
- Shawn Mendes – #MTVLAINSTAGLSHAWN
- **Jungkook – #MTVLAINSTAGLJUNGKOOK**
- Billie Eilish – #MTVLAINSTAGLBILLIE
- Bad Bunny – #MTVLAINSTAGLBADBUNNY
- Juanpa Zurita – #MTVLAINSTAGLZURITA
- J Balvin – #MTVLAINSTAGLBALVIN

=== Instagramer level god Mexico ===
- Kenia Os – #MTVLAINSTAMXKENIA
- Mane – #MTVLAINSTAMXMANE
- Malcriado.X – #MTVLAINSTAMXMALCRIADO
- Berth Oh – #MTVLAINSTAMXBERTH
- **Kim Shantal – #MTVLAINSTAMXKIM**
- Gisselle Kuri – #MTVLAINSTAMXGISSELLE
- Danna Paola – #MTVLAINSTAMXDANNA
- Mario Bautista – #MTVLAINSTAMXBAUTISTA

=== Instagramer level god Colombia ===
- Llane – #MTVLAINSTACOLLANE
- **Luisa Fernanda W – #MTVLAINSTACOLUISA**
- Reykon – #MTVLAINSTACOREYKON
- Mafe Méndez – #MTVLAINSTACOMAFE
- Karol G – #MTVLAINSTACOKAROL
- Javi Ramírez – #MTVLAINSTACOJAVI
- Laura Tobon – #MTVLAINSTACOLAURA
- Mario Ruíz – #MTVLAINSTACOMARIO

=== Instagramer god level Argentina ===
- Paulo Londra – #MTVLAINSTAARLONDRA
- **María Becerra – #MTVLAINSTAARBECERRA**
- Charlotte Caniggia – #MTVLAINSTAARCHARLOTTE
- Kevsho – #MTVLAINSTAARKEVSHO
- Tini – #MTVLAINSTAARTINI
- Agustín Casanova – #MTVLAINSTAARCASANOVA
- Duki – #MTVLAINSTAARDUKI
- Lali – #MTVLAINSTAARLALI

=== Viral artist ===
- Anitta – #MTVLAVIRALANITTA
- Anuel AA – #MTVLAVIRALANUEL
- Cazzu – #MTVLAVIRALCAZZU
- Lele Pons – #MTVLAVIRALLELE
- Mario Bautista – #MTVLAVIRALBAUTISTA
- **Natti Natasha – #MTVLAVIRALNATASHA**
- Paloma Mami – #MTVLAVIRALMAMI
- Thalia – #MTVLAVIRALTHALIA

=== Music-ship of the year ===
- Bad Bunny Feat. Drake – Mia
- Becky G & Paulo Londra – When I Kiss You
- **DJ Snake Feat. Selena Gomez, Cardi B, Ozuna – Taki Taki**
- Los Auténticos Decadentes & Mon Laferte – Love
- Mau & Ricky Feat. Manuel Turizo, Camilo – Unknown
- Reik Feat. Wisin & Yandel – Duele
- Rosalía Feat. J Balvin, El Guincho – With Altura
- Sofía Reyes Feat. Anitta & Rita Ora – RIP

=== EMERGENT ===
- German
- Chinese Bándalos
- Aleman
- Ca7riel
- Ed Maverick
- Elsa and Elmar
- Ghetto Kids
- Juan Ingaramo
- Vice Menta

=== Tiktoker of the year ===
- Jean Carlo León
- Amara Que Linda
- Ami Rodríguez
- Xime Ponch
- Joaquín Orellana S
- Ivanna Pérez
- Kevlex
