= Lizbeth Rodríguez =

Mexican YouTuber and actress (born 1994)

Lizbeth Rodriguez
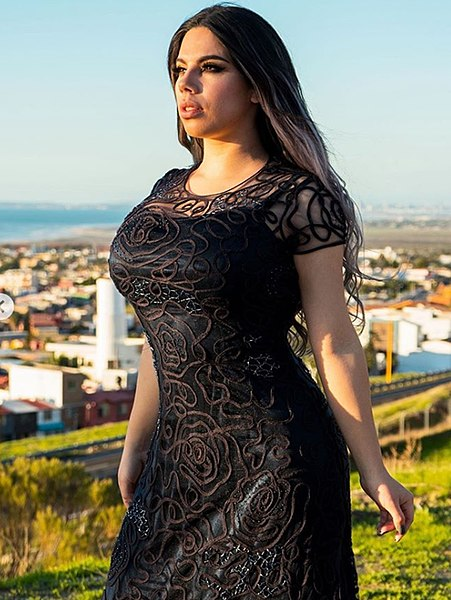
- Born: Lizbeth Rodríguez; 22 May 1994 (age 32); Tijuana, Baja California, Mexico
- Children: 2

YouTube information
- Channel: Lizbeth Rodriguez
- Years active: 2018–present
- Subscribers: 10.2 million
- Views: 2.3 billion
- Last updated: 4 August 2026

Lizbeth Rodríguez (born 22 May 1994), also known as Lizbeth Rodriguez, la caza infieles is a Mexican YouTuber, and an ex member of the company Badabun, which distributes original viral content on YouTube and Facebook. She is known for hosting the YouTube channel's successful program, 'Exponiendo infieles' (Exposing cheaters), in which couples are offered money in exchange for letting her review the social media networks on their cell phones and expose the unfaithful the partners are in her channel.

As of October 2026, her personal YouTube channel has 10.3 million subscribers and she also has more than 10 million followers on Instagram and around 19 million followers on Facebook.

== Biography ==
Lizbeth Rodriguez was born on 22 May 1994, in Tijuana, Baja California, Mexico. She grew up with domestic violence in the family and decided to study theater at the age of 16. Without her family's support, however, she left home to live with a friend and start her career. To support herself, she worked in different jobs as a waitress and in a karaoke.

== Career ==
=== Exponiendo infieles ===
Rodriguez studied a degree in theater, where she met members of Badabun who invited her to join the company as a technical assistant. After meeting her, the executives of the chain decided to have her present the Badabun Exponiendo Infieles program in May 2018, following a change of presenter. After Rodriguez took on this role, the program became, in a few short months, one of the most watched of the channel and the fastest growing in Spanish and Portuguese within the YouTube platform.

== Personal life ==
Rodriguez has a younger brother whom she helped raise. She was in a relationship with fellow Badabun presenter Tavo Betancourt. She has a son named Eros, and she introduced him for the first time on her social media accounts in August 2019.

== Filmography ==
=== YouTuber ===
Year	Title	Roles	Notes
2018–2019	Exponiendo infieles	Presenter	Main host
2018–2019	Todo o Nada	Presenter	Main host
2019	Exponiendo Youtubers	Presenter	Main host
2019–2021	Preguntas Picantes con...	Presenter	Main host
2020	Secretos	Presenter	Main host
2020–2021	Corajillo	Presenter	Main host
2020–2021	Infieles T-2	Presenter	Main host

== Awards and nominations ==
Year	Award	Category	Result	Ref.
2019	Eliot Award 2019	Revelación del Año	nominada	
2019	MTV MIAW 2019	Bomba Viral (Exponiendo Infieles)	nominada	
