= Pink Aura =

Studio album by Kenia Os
- Released: April 24, 2024
- Genre: Latin Pop
- Length: 40:38
- Label: Sony
- Producers: JonTheProducer, Mi$HNZ, Richi López

Kenia Os chronology
K23 (2022)	Pink Aura (2024)	Flow Mamita Rica (2024)

Singles from Pink Aura
- 1. "Ojo X Ojo" Released: October 27, 2023; 2. "Bobo" Released: January 19, 2024; 3. "Tortura" Released: March 15, 2024; 4. "Kitty" Released: April 24, 2024; 5. "Mamita Rica" Released: May 30, 2024; 6. "VIP" Released: July 11, 2024

Pink Aura is the third studio album by Mexican singer Kenia Os. It was released through Sony Music Mexico and 5020 Records on April 24, 2024. Guest performers on the album include La Joaqui, Villano Antillano, Bella Poarch, and Ghetto Kids.
