= Gera MX =

Mexican rapper, singer and composer (born 1994)

- Born: Gerardo Daniel Torres Montante; 15 July 1994 (age 32); San Nicolás de los Garza, Nuevo León, Mexico
- Genres: Hip-hop; Latin trap; reggaeton
- Occupations: Rapper; singer; composer
- Instrument: Vocals
- Years active: 2011–present
- Label: Sony Mexico

Gerardo Daniel Torres Montante (born 15 July 1994) better known by his stage name Gera MX (formerly Gera MXM that stands for Mexamafia), is a Mexican rapper and songwriter. His stage name comes from the first four letters of his real name, "Gera" (short for Gerardo), and "MX" for Mexico. He was ranked number thirty-seven on the list of the "50 Greatest Rappers in the History of Spanish-Language Rap", published by the American magazine Rolling Stone.

== Early life ==
He was born on July 15, 1994, in San Nicolás de los Garza, Nuevo León. At the age of 3, his mother took him to live in the city of San Luis Potosí due to family issues. In fourth grade, he began to take an interest in rap, and by the first year of middle school, he started improvising and attempting rhymes to impress his classmates. He attended several middle schools, as he was expelled from every one he went to. Later, he became involved in gang-related problems, which led him to move back to Monterrey, where he attended high school. Gera grew up listening to Control Machete, Cartel de Santa, Psycho Realm, Akwid, Caballeros del Plan G, and Molotov, who were major influences in his decision to pursue rap.

== Career ==
He joined the Mexamafia crew after attending a concert where Rhinox a former member of the MXM crew heard his talent and invited him to join Mexamafia. That’s where his musical career began, with one of the most well-known rap groups of the time, Mexamafia, performing as Rinox’s backup vocalist at concerts and also recording demo tracks such as “Caos en el paraíso” and “A medio camino”, collaborating with artists like Rinox, Santa RM, and Tanke One. Gera MX has referred to Tanke One as his mentor in his song “Quise ser”, from the album Precipicio. However, shortly after contributing to Mexamafia, he left the crew due to conflicts with Tanke One, the co-founder of Mexamafia. Tensions escalated after Tanke One had a physical altercation with José Castro, Gera MX’s former manager and the director of JB Entertainment. Following these incidents, Gera changed his stage name from Gera MXM to Gera MX to continue his artistic career. He also left JB Entertainment due to legal issues involving a lawsuit, and then moved into the next phase of his career by creating his own record label, Rich Vagos. This label now includes several urban music artists such as Samantha Barrón, Team Revolver, Bipo Montana, Geassassin, Opyi (formerly Opium G), Denilson, Iyhon Secuaz, Jay Romero, and Jayrick as a producer, along with Ezzlaer, Villax, Zarri, and $anta. On August 30, 2021, his hit single “Botella Tras Botella” (featuring Christian Nodal) became the most-viewed official music video in Mexican rap history on YouTube.

== Discography ==
=== Studio albums ===
- Comienza la funcion (2011)
- Caos en el paraíso (2011)
- A medio camino (2012)
- Precipicio (2013)
- No veo, no siento (2014)
- No me maten antes de hoy (2015)
- Los niños grandes no juegan (2017)
- El vicio y la fama (2019)
- 444 Paradise: encerrado no enterado (2020)
- Los no tan tristes (2021)
- socios (2022)
- No teníamos nada, pero éramos felices (2022)
- Ahora tengo todo menos a ti (2022)
- Mustang 65 (2023)
- Las que te escribí y nunca te cante (2023)
- Las que te escribí y nunca te cante (unplugged) (2024)
- Rich-Mafia Vol.1 (2024)
- Las que escribí y nunca saque (2025)
- modo fantasma (2025)
- X amor al arte (2026)
