= Kimberly Loaiza =

Mexican singer Internet personality (born 1997)

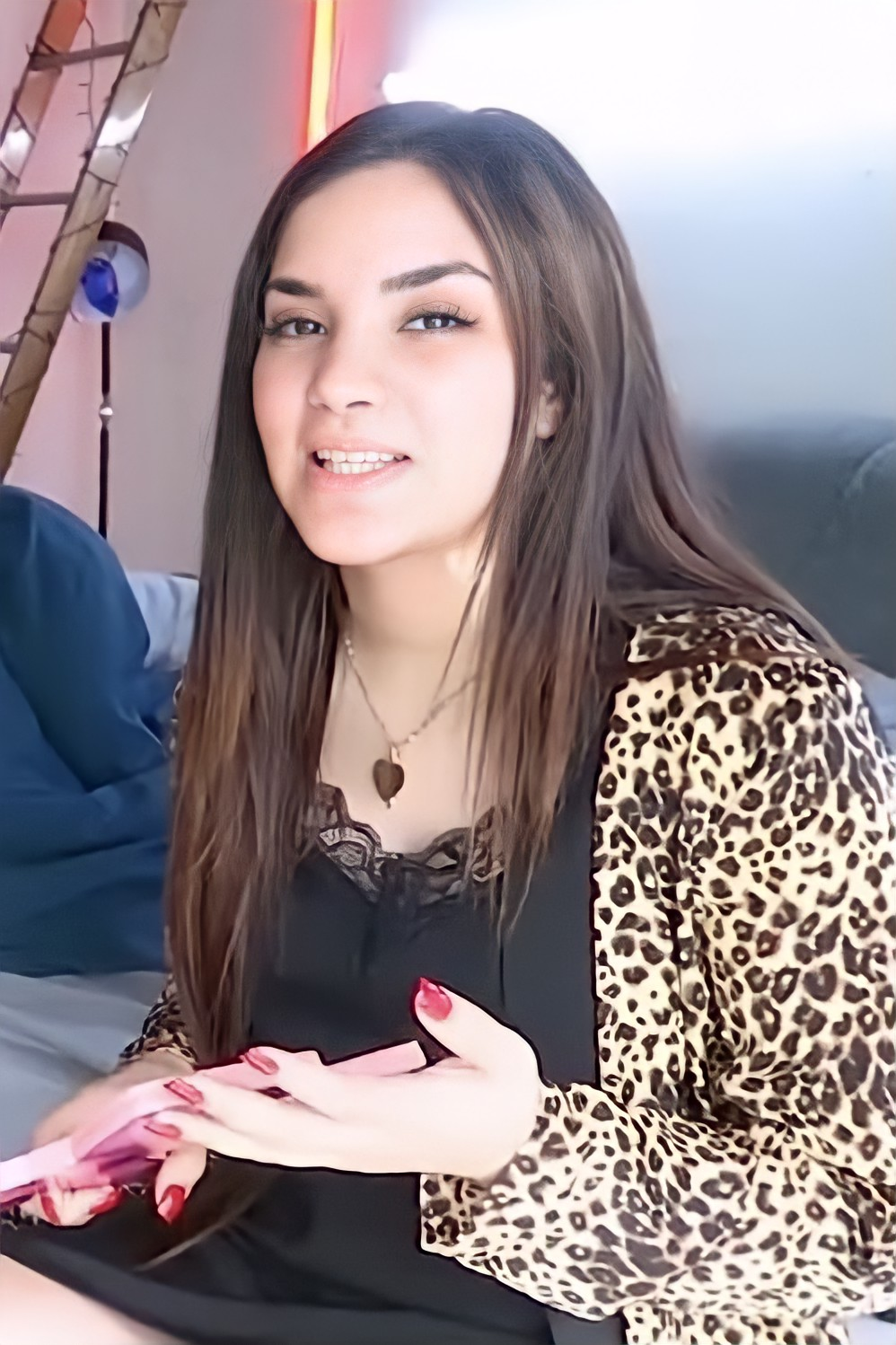
- Kim Loaiza in 2020
- Born: Kimberly Guadalupe Loaiza; 12 December 1997 (age 28); Mexicali, Baja California, Mexico
- Other name: Kim Loaiza
- Occupation: Internet personality
- Spouse: Juan De Dios Pantoja Nuñez (m. 2020)
- Children: 2

YouTube information
- Channel: Kimberly Loaiza
- Years active: 2016–2023
- Subscribers: 47,4 million
- Views: 7.9 billion
- Last updated: May 11, 2025

Kimberly Guadalupe Loaiza Martinez (born 12 December 1997) is a Mexican singer. She began her YouTube career in 2016, and in 2020, she was the seventh most-followed user on TikTok.

== Career ==
Kimberly Loaiza created her Twitter account when she was fourteen years old. Five years later, in 2016, she started vlogging on YouTube with her first video on November 15, 2016. Loaiza traveled to Colombia for rhinoplasty surgery. Loaiza initially made makeup videos, hair tutorials, and trivia for girls; however, over the years her content changed to make more vlogs, challenges and tags with her friends. In 2019, Loaiza began a career in music and released her first single, Enamorarme; later, other singles included "More, Tequila and shot, Turn off the light, Our Agreement, Don't be jealous", among others, but people don't consider her a singer because she is not 100% focused on music.

In 2020, Loaiza launched a clothing line, opened her own telephone company, broke the record of the most subscribers on YouTube for Spanish-speakers, and collaborated with other social media personalities such as James Charles. In 2021, Loaiza's partner, Juan de Dios Pantoja, appeared in a leaked video where he allegedly had sex with another woman. The scandal worsened when fellow Mexican YouTuber Lizbeth Rodríguez alleged that she had the necessary evidence to expose Juan de Dios Pantoja infidelity with Kevin Achutegui, a friend of Loaiza who is also known for being the personal photographer of both YouTubers. After several videos defending himself, de Dios Pantoja apologized to Loaiza, who forgave him and they continued their relationship.

In mid-2021, the "MTV MIAW 2021" awards were held. Loaiza was nominated for Icon MIAW, Creator of the Year, Couple on Fire (for her relationship with Juan de Dios Pantoja called "Jukilop") and Fandom of the Year.

== Personal life ==
Loaiza has been in a relationship with Juan de Dios Pantoja since 2012. After six years of dating, they announced the arrival of their first child. In 2020, Loaiza revealed that she had married Juan de Dios Pantoja, also mentioning that they were expecting their second child. Soon afterwards, their second child was born.

== Discography ==
=== Singles ===
- Amandote (with Juan de Dios Pantoja)- 2019
- No Seas Celoso - 2019
- Me Perdiste - 2020
- Bye Bye - 2020
- Do It (with Dimitri Vegas & Like Mike & Azteck) - 2020
- Apaga La Luz - 2020
- Me Perdiste Remix (with Casper Magico & Lyanno) - 2021
- De Lao Remix (with Ely Blancarte, Elvis de Yongol & Franzata) - 2021
- Mejor Sola (with Zion & Lennox) - 2021
- Ya no somos - 2021
- Después de las 12 (with Ovi) - 2022
- Incondicional (with Juan de Dios Pantoja & Lyanno) - 2022

== Filmography ==
=== TV ===
Year	Cou.	Programme	Genre	Role	Notes	State	Net
2019	(Mexico)	Hoy	Magazine	Invited			Las estrellas
2021	(Mexico)	Así se baila	Reality show	Contestant	With José Gregorio Pantoja	Withdrew	Telemundo
