= Botella Tras Botella =

2021 single by Gera MX and Christian Nodal

Single by Gera MX and Christian Nodal
- Released: April 23, 2021
- Recorded: 2021
- Genre: Regional Mexican; country; hip-hop; ranchera; Latin pop; balada
- Length: 3:17
- Label: Universal Latin; Virgin
- Songwriters: Christian Nodal; Denilson Meléndez Jaramillo; Édgar Barrera; Erick Gutiérrez Cervantes; Gerardo Torres Montante; Victor Yael García Zenteno
- Producers: Edgar Barrera; Erick Gutiérrez Cervantes

Gera MX singles chronology
"No Se Sobrepase" (2021)	"Botella Tras Botella" (2021)	"Wiken" (2021)

Christian Nodal singles chronology
"2 Veces" (2021)	"Botella Tras Botella" (2021)	"La Sinvergüenza" (2021)

Music video
- "Botella Tras Botella" on YouTube

"Botella Tras Botella" (transl. "Bottle After Bottle") is a song by Mexican rapper Gera MX and Mexican singer-songwriter Christian Nodal, released on April 23, 2021. The single received an online boost on the social media platform TikTok as Nodal teased the song on his Twitch stream weeks before the song's official release.

Since its release, the single has broken records, such as being the first regional Mexican single to debut on the Billboard Hot 100 for the week ending May 8, 2021. "Botella Tras Botella" debuted at No. 60 on the Hot 100, earning Nodal and Gera MX their first entries.

== Chart performance ==
In the United States, the single became the first-ever regional Mexican song to appear on the Billboard Hot 100 chart in its 63-year-history. It debuted at No. 60 in its first week on the chart, giving Gera MX and Nodal their first Hot 100 hit. It also debuted at No. 40 on the Streaming Songs chart, while also debuting at No. 3 on Hot Latin Songs, earning Gera MX his first appearance on the chart and Nodal's 15th and new career-best, besting his 2017 song "Adiós Amor".

The song debuted in the top 10 on the Billboard Global 200 chart, entering at number nine for the week ending May 8, 2021.

== Charts ==
=== Weekly charts ===
Weekly chart performance for "Botella Tras Botella"
Chart (2021)	Peak position
Costa Rica (Monitor Latino)	3
El Salvador (Monitor Latino)	2
Global 200 (Billboard)	9
Guatemala (Monitor Latino)	1
Mexico (Monitor Latino)	1
Nicaragua (Monitor Latino)	2
US Billboard Hot 100	60
US Hot Latin Songs (Billboard)	3
US Latin Airplay (Billboard)	15
US Regional Mexican Airplay (Billboard)	6
US Rolling Stone Top 100	41

=== Year-end charts ===
Year-end chart performance for "Botella Tras Botella"
Chart (2021)	Position
Global 200 (Billboard)	140
US Hot Latin Songs (Billboard)	13

== Certifications ==
Region	Certification	Certified units/sales
Mexico (AMPROFON)	Diamond+Platinum+Gold	910,000^{‡}
United States (RIAA)	14× Platinum (Latin)	840,000^{‡}
Streaming
Central America (CFC)	2× Platinum	14,000,000^{†}
^{‡} Sales+streaming figures based on certification alone.^{†} Streaming-only figures based on certification alone.
