= List of influencer boxing matches =

These bouts consist of YouTubers, streamers, TikTokers, and other types of internet celebrities across traditional boxing, chess boxing and bare-knuckle boxing.

== Boxing ==
Match	Event	Result	Ref.
2018
Uosof Ahmadi vs Exploring with Josh	KSI vs Joe Weller; 3 February 2018	Ahmadi — PTS	
Liam Twinn vs Jake Twinn	KSI vs Joe Weller; 3 February 2018	Liam Twinn — PTS	
AnEsonGib vs MaxPlays	KSI vs Joe Weller; 3 February 2018	AnEsonGib — KO (2/3)	
JMX vs Mike Fox	KSI vs Joe Weller; 3 February 2018	JMX — TKO (3/3)	
KSI vs Joe Weller	KSI vs Joe Weller; 3 February 2018	KSI — TKO (3/6)	
Halal Ham vs Jrizzy Jeremy	KSI vs Logan Paul; 25 August 2018	Ham — PTS	
Momo vs RossiHD	KSI vs Logan Paul; 25 August 2018	Momo — PTS	
JMX vs Coach Richard	KSI vs Logan Paul; 25 August 2018	JMX — PTS	
FaZe Sensei vs Overtflow	KSI vs Logan Paul; 25 August 2018	Sensei — KO (3/3)	
Michael Philippou vs Scarce	KSI vs Logan Paul; 25 August 2018	Philippou — TKO (3/3)	
AnEsonGib vs Jay Swingler	KSI vs Logan Paul; 25 August 2018	AnEsonGib — PTS	
Deji Olatunji vs Jake Paul	KSI vs Logan Paul; 25 August 2018	Paul — TKO (5/6)	
KSI vs Logan Paul	KSI vs Logan Paul; 25 August 2018	Draw — MD	
2019
Supreme Patty vs Rudy Prieto	Jorge Masvidal vs. Anthony Pettis; 15 June 2019	Prieto — UD	
Adam Saleh vs Marcus Stephenson	Fight Night Yemen We Care Charity Boxing; 29 September 2019	Saleh — UD	
Fousey vs Slim Albaher	Fight Night Yemen We Care Charity Boxing; 29 September 2019	Albaher — TKO (4/6)	
Tyler Smith vs Josh Brueckner	KSI vs. Logan Paul II; 9 November 2019	Brueckner — UD	
KSI vs Logan Paul	KSI vs. Logan Paul II; 9 November 2019	KSI — SD	
2020
Jake Paul vs AnEsonGib	Demetrius Andrade vs. Luke Keeler; 20 January 2020	Paul — TKO (1/6)	
Jake Paul vs Nate Robinson	Mike Tyson vs. Roy Jones Jr. 28 November 2020	Paul — KO (2/6)	
2021
Jake Paul vs Ben Askren	Jake Paul vs. Ben Askren; 17 April 2021	Paul — KO (1/8)	
Future vs Torete	La Velada del Año; 26 May 2021	Torete — TKO (2/3)	
Mr Jägger vs ViruZz	La Velada del Año; 26 May 2021	Jägger — SD	
Reven vs ElMillor	La Velada del Año; 26 May 2021	Reven — UD	
Floyd Mayweather Jr. vs Logan Paul	Floyd Mayweather Jr. vs. Logan Paul; 6 June 2021	—N/a	
Ryan Johnston vs Cale Saurage	YouTubers vs. TikTokers; 12 June 2021	Johnston — TKO (5/5)	
Landon McBroom vs Ben Azelart	YouTubers vs. TikTokers; 12 June 2021	McBroom — KO (2/5)	
Jarvis Khattri vs Michael Le	YouTubers vs. TikTokers; 12 June 2021	Khattri — KO (2/5)	
DDG vs Nate Wyatt	YouTubers vs. TikTokers; 12 June 2021	DDG — UD	
Deji Olatunji vs Vinnie Hacker	YouTubers vs. TikTokers; 12 June 2021	Hacker — TKO (3/5)	
AnEsonGib vs Tayler Holder	YouTubers vs. TikTokers; 12 June 2021	AnEsonGib — UD	
Austin McBroom vs Bryce Hall	YouTubers vs. TikTokers; 12 June 2021	McBroom — TKO (3/5)	
Evil Hero vs Dakota Olave	Bare Knuckle Fighting Championship 19; 23 July 2021	Evil Hero — UD	
Nick Ireland vs DK Money	Bare Knuckle Fighting Championship 19; 23 July 2021	Ireland — MD	
Blueface vs Kane Trujillo	Bare Knuckle Fighting Championship 19; 23 July 2021	Blueface — UD	
3bidaan vs Mohamed Khalid	Social Knockout; 30 July 2021	3bidaan — TKO (2/3)	
N&A Productions vs Slim Albaher	Social Knockout; 30 July 2021	Albaher — KO (1/3)	
Walid Sharks vs Adam Saleh	Social Knockout; 30 July 2021	Draw — MD	
Money Kicks vs Anas Elshayib	Social Knockout; 30 July 2021	Kicks — UD	
Jake Paul vs Tyron Woodley	Jake Paul vs. Tyron Woodley; 29 August 2021	Paul — SD	
Adnan Bin Sultan vs N&A Productions	Social Knockout 2; 30 October 2021	N&A Productions — UD	
Tyson vs Breadbatch	Social Knockout 2; 30 October 2021	Tyson — KO (3/3)	
Jonny Young vs Louis James	Social Knockout 2; 30 October 2021	Draw — UD	
Slim Albaher vs 3bidaan	Social Knockout 2; 30 October 2021	Albaher — KO (3/3)	
Jumana Abdu Rahman vs Sarleen Ahmed	Social Knockout 2; 30 October 2021	Khan — UD	
Anas Elshayb vs Adam Saleh	Social Knockout 2; 30 October 2021	Saleh — UD	
Ajmal Khan vs Money Kicks	Social Knockout 2; 30 October 2021	Kicks — KO (1/3)	
Jake Paul vs Tyron Woodley	Jake Paul vs. Tyron Woodley II; 18 December 2021	Paul — KO (6/8)	
2022
Acelino Freitas vs Whindersson Nunes	Fight Music Show 1: Whindersson vs. Popó; 30 January 2022	Draw — UD	
Salt Papi vs Halal Ham	Deji vs Alex Wassabi; 5 March 2022	Papi — UD	
Stromedy vs Austin Sprinz	Deji vs Alex Wassabi; 5 March 2022	Stromedy — MD	
Ryan Taylor vs DK Money	Deji vs Alex Wassabi; 5 March 2022	DK Money — DQ (1/4)	
Armz Korleone vs Malcom Minikon	Deji vs Alex Wassabi; 5 March 2022	Korleone — UD	
Kristen Hanby vs Vitaly Zdorovetskiy	Deji vs Alex Wassabi; 5 March 2022	Draw — MD	
King Kenny vs FaZe Temperrr	Deji vs Alex Wassabi; 5 March 2022	Temperrr — UD	
Deji Olatunji vs Alex Wassabi	Deji vs Alex Wassabi; 5 March 2022	Wassabi — SD	
Matt Watson vs Dad	Creator Clash; 14 May 2022	Dad — TKO (1/5)	
Ryan Magee vs Alex Ernst	Creator Clash; 14 May 2022	Ernst — UD	
DJ Welch vs Erik Hoffstad	Creator Clash; 14 May 2022	DJ Welch — TKO (2/5)	
I Did a Thing vs TheOdd1sOut	Creator Clash; 14 May 2022	I Did a Thing — KO (1/5)	
Yodeling Haley vs JustaMinx	Creator Clash; 14 May 2022	JustaMinx — TKO (4/5)	
Hundar vs Starkilla	Creator Clash; 14 May 2022	Hundar — KO (5/5)	
Michael Reeves vs Graham Stephan	Creator Clash; 14 May 2022	Reeves — TKO (2/5)	
Harley Morenstein vs Arin Hanson	Creator Clash; 14 May 2022	Morenstein — TKO (2/5)	
iDubbbz vs Doctor Mike	Creator Clash; 14 May 2022	Doctor Mike — UD	
Carola vs Spursito	La Velada del Año 2; 25 June 2022	Spursito — UD	
AriGameplays vs Paracetamor	La Velada del Año 2; 25 June 2022	AriGameplays — SD	
Momo vs Viruzz	La Velada del Año 2; 25 June 2022	Viruzz — TKO (3/3)	
Luzu vs Lolito	La Velada del Año 2; 25 June 2022	Lolito — RTD (1/3)	
Mr Jägger vs David Bustamante	La Velada del Año 2; 25 June 2022	Jägger — RTD (2/3)	
Tempo Arts vs Smithey	Ed Matthews vs Simple Simon; 16 July 2022	Tempo Arts — UD	
Paddy Murphy vs Dave the Other Guy	Ed Matthews vs Simple Simon; 16 July 2022	Dave — UD	
Pully Arif vs Tommy Flex	Ed Matthews vs Simple Simon; 16 July 2022	Arif — UD	
Luke Bennett vs Dean Lm	Ed Matthews vs Simple Simon; 16 July 2022	LM — TKO (1/3)	
Ginty vs KayRhys	Ed Matthews vs Simple Simon; 16 July 2022	Ginty — MD	
Chef Dave vs Aaron Hunt	Ed Matthews vs Simple Simon; 16 July 2022	Hunt — KO (2/3)	
Elle Brooke vs AJ Bunker	Ed Matthews vs Simple Simon; 16 July 2022	Brooke — UD	
Ed Matthews vs Simple Simon	Ed Matthews vs Simple Simon; 16 July 2022	Matthews — KO (1/5)	
Money Kicks vs Traycho Georgiev	Oleksandr Usyk vs Anthony Joshua II; 20 August 2022	Georgiev — SD	
KSI vs Swarmz	MF & DAZN: X Series 001; 27 August 2022	KSI — KO (2/3)	
Deen the Great vs Evil Hero	MF & DAZN: X Series 001; 27 August 2022	Great — TKO (1/3)	
Sam Hyde vs IAmThmpsn	MF & DAZN: X Series 001; 27 August 2022	Hyde — TKO (3/3)	
Salt Papi vs Andy Warski	MF & DAZN: X Series 001; 27 August 2022	Papi — KO (1/3)	
King Kenny vs FaZe Sensei	MF & DAZN: X Series 001; 27 August 2022	Kenny — MD	
Deji Olatunji vs Fousey	MF & DAZN: X Series 001; 27 August 2022	Olatunji — TKO (3/4)	
FaZe Temperrr vs Slim Albaher	MF & DAZN: X Series 001; 27 August 2022	Albaher — KO (2/4)	
KSI vs Luis Alcaraz Pineda	MF & DAZN: X Series 001; 27 August 2022	KSI — KO (3/3)	
Landon McBroom vs Adam Saleh	Austin McBroom vs. AnEsonGib; 10 September 2022	Draw — UD	
Swaggy P vs Malcom Minikon	Austin McBroom vs. AnEsonGib; 10 September 2022	No Contest — (4/5)	
Austin McBroom vs AnEsonGib	Austin McBroom vs. AnEsonGib; 10 September 2022	AnEsonGib — KO (4/6)	
Halal Ham vs DTG	MF & DAZN: X Series 002; 15 October 2022	Ham — UD	
Ashley Rak-Su vs Anthony Talyor	MF & DAZN: X Series 002; 15 October 2022	Taylor — UD	
Astrid Wett vs Keeley Colbran	MF & DAZN: X Series 002; 15 October 2022	Wett — RTD (1/3)	
JMX vs Ginty	MF & DAZN: X Series 002; 15 October 2022	JMX — KO (3/3)	
Slim Albaher vs Ryan Taylor	MF & DAZN: X Series 002; 15 October 2022	Albaher — UD	
Jay Swingler vs Cherdleys	MF & DAZN: X Series 002; 15 October 2022	Swingler — KO (1/4)	
Chris Avila vs Doctor Mike	Jake Paul vs. Anderson Silva; 29 October 2022	Avila — UD	
Jake Paul vs Anderson Silva	Jake Paul vs. Anderson Silva; 29 October 2022	Paul — UD	
Floyd Mayweather Jr. vs Deji Olatunji	Floyd Mayweather Jr. vs Deji; 13 November 2022	Mayweather Jr. — TKO (6/8)	
Minikon vs NickNackPattiwack	MF & DAZN: X Series 003; 19 November 2022	Minikon — DQ (4/4)	
Ice Poseidon vs Brandon Buckingham	MF & DAZN: X Series 003; 19 November 2022	Buckingham — TKO (1/4)	
FaZe Temperrr vs Overtflow	MF & DAZN: X Series 003; 19 November 2022	Temperrr — KO (1/4)	
King Kenny vs DK Money	MF & DAZN: X Series 003; 19 November 2022	Kenny — KO (1/4)	
Josh Brueckner vs Chase DeMoor	MF & DAZN: X Series 003; 19 November 2022	Brueckner — RTD (2/4)	
Deen the Great vs Walid Sharks	MF & DAZN: X Series 003; 19 November 2022	Great — KO (3/4)	
2023
Faith Ordway vs Elle Brooke	MF & DAZN: X Series 004; 14 January 2023	Brooke — TKO (1/3)	
Ryan Taylor vs Swarmz	MF & DAZN: X Series 004; 14 January 2023	Swarmz — TKO (1/3)	
Luis Alcaraz Pineda vs BDave	MF & DAZN: X Series 004; 14 January 2023	Pineda — UD (3/3)	
Salt Papi vs Josh Brueckner	MF & DAZN: X Series 004; 14 January 2023	Papi — KO (2/4)	
Slim Albaher vs Tom Zanetti	MF & DAZN: X Series 004; 14 January 2023	Albaher — UD (4/4)	
KSI vs FaZe Temperrr	MF & DAZN: X Series 004; 14 January 2023	KSI — KO (1/4)	
Adam Saleh vs Evil Hero	Jake Paul vs Tommy Fury; 26 February 2023	Saleh — RTD (1/4)	
Jake Paul vs Tommy Fury	Jake Paul vs Tommy Fury; 26 February 2023	Fury — SD	
Tempo Arts vs Godson Umeh	MF & DAZN: X Series 005; 4 March 2023	Tempo Arts — RTD (1/3)	
Ginty vs Halal Ham	MF & DAZN: X Series 005; 4 March 2023	Ginty — UD	
Astrid Wett vs AJ Bunker	MF & DAZN: X Series 005; 4 March 2023	Wett — MD	
Los Pineda Coladas vs D-Generation Ice (Luis Alcaraz Pineda & BDave vs Anthony Vargas & Ice Poseidon)	MF & DAZN: X Series 005; 4 March 2023	Los Pineda Coladas — TKO (2/4)	
King Kenny vs Ashley Rak-Su	MF & DAZN: X Series 005; 4 March 2023	Rak-Su — SD	
Deen the Great vs Pully Arif	MF & DAZN: X Series 005; 4 March 2023	Deen — UD	
Jay Swingler vs NichLmao	MF & DAZN: X Series 005; 4 March 2023	Swingler — MD	
Jack Manifold vs Dakota Olave	Creator Clash 2; 15 April 2023	Manifold — UD	
Jaelaray vs Abelina Sabrina	Creator Clash 2; 15 April 2023	Jaelaray — UD	
Dad vs Starkilla	Creator Clash 2; 15 April 2023	Dad — TKO (1/5)	
William Haynes vs Chris Ray Gun	Creator Clash 2; 15 April 2023	Haynes — TKO (2/5)	
RIPMika vs Alanah Pearce	Creator Clash 2; 15 April 2023	Pearce — SD	
Myth vs Hundar	Creator Clash 2; 15 April 2023	Myth — TKO (1/5)	
Hayley Sharpe vs Marisha Ray	Creator Clash 2; 15 April 2023	Sharpe — UD	
Arin Hanson vs Jarvis Johnson	Creator Clash 2; 15 April 2023	Hanson — TKO (2/5)	
Andrea Botez vs Michelle Khare	Creator Clash 2; 15 April 2023	Khare — UD	
Leonhart vs CrankGamePlays	Creator Clash 2; 15 April 2023	CrankGamePlays — TKO (3/5)	
John Morrison vs Harley Morenstein	Creator Clash 2; 15 April 2023	Morrison — TKO (3/5)	
Alex Wassabi vs iDubbbz	Creator Clash 2; 15 April 2023	Wassabi — MD	
Fangs vs Alaena Vampira	MF & DAZN: X Series 006; 21 April 2023	Vampira — TKO (2/4)	
Chase DeMoor vs Stevie Knight	MF & DAZN: X Series 006; 21 April 2023	Knight — DQ (1/4)	
Kimbo Slice Jr. vs OJ Rosé	MF & DAZN: X Series 006; 21 April 2023	Rosé — TKO (2/4)	
Minikon vs Jake the Viking	MF & DAZN: X Series 006; 21 April 2023	Draw — SD	
Uncle Pizza vs YuddyGangTV	MF & DAZN: X Series 006; 21 April 2023	Pizza — SD	
Walid Sharks vs Ayye Pap	MF & DAZN: X Series 006; 21 April 2023	Sharks — KO (2/4)	
JMX vs Le'Veon Bell	MF & DAZN: X Series 006; 21 April 2023	Bell — UD	
Emily Brooke vs Amber O’Donnell	Kingpyn High Stakes Tournament Quarterfinals; 22 April 2023	Brooke — UD	
6ar6ie6 vs Whitney Johns	Kingpyn High Stakes Tournament Quarterfinals; 22 April 2023	6ar6ie6 — UD	
My Mate Nate vs King Kenny	Kingpyn High Stakes Tournament Quarterfinals; 22 April 2023	King Kenny — TKO (2/5)	
Daniella Hemsley vs Jully Poca	Kingpyn High Stakes Tournament Quarterfinals; 22 April 2023	Poca — UD	
Jarvis Khattri vs Tom Zanetti	Kingpyn High Stakes Tournament Quarterfinals; 22 April 2023	Khattri — TKO (3/5)	
Elle Brooke vs Ms. Danielka	Kingpyn High Stakes Tournament Quarterfinals; 22 April 2023	Brooke — UD	
Ed Matthews vs Blueface	Kingpyn High Stakes Tournament Quarterfinals; 22 April 2023	Blueface — TKO (4/4)	
Whindersson Nunes vs Filipek	Kingpyn High Stakes Tournament Quarterfinals; 22 April 2023	Nunes — TKO (2/5)	
AnEsonGib vs Austin McBroom	Kingpyn High Stakes Tournament Quarterfinals; 22 April 2023	AnEsonGib — TKO (3/5)	
Halal Ham vs Zuckles	MF & DAZN: X Series 007; 13 May 2023	Ham — UD	
Papi Luisito vs Callum King	MF & DAZN: X Series 007; 13 May 2023	Luisito — UD	
Corn vs Unbaer	MF & DAZN: X Series 007; 13 May 2023	Unbaer — SD	
WingsOfRedemption vs Boogie2988	MF & DAZN: X Series 007; 13 May 2023	WingsOfRedemption — TKO (2/3)	
Little Bellsy vs Lil Kymchii	MF & DAZN: X Series 007; 13 May 2023	Bellsy — UD	
ViruZz vs DK Money	MF & DAZN: X Series 007; 13 May 2023	No Contest — (2/3)	
Tennessee Thresh vs Paigey Cakey	MF & DAZN: X Series 007; 13 May 2023	Cakey — UD	
Salt Papi vs Anthony Taylor	MF & DAZN: X Series 007; 13 May 2023	Taylor — UD	
Deji Olatunji vs Swarmz	MF & DAZN: X Series 007; 13 May 2023	Olatunji — UD	
KSI vs Joe Fournier	MF & DAZN: X Series 007; 13 May 2023	No Contest — (2/6)	
Ampeter vs Abraham Mateo	La Velada del Año 3; 1 July 2023	Mateo — UD	
Samy Rivers vs Marina Rivers	La Velada del Año 3; 1 July 2023	Marina Rivers — UD	
Luzu vs Fernanfloo	La Velada del Año 3; 1 July 2023	Fernanfloo — UD	
Shelao vs Misho Amoli	La Velada del Año 3; 1 July 2023	Shelao — TKO (1/3)	
Samy Rivers vs Mayichi	La Velada del Año 3; 1 July 2023	Samy Rivers — UD	
Germán Garmendia vs Coscu	La Velada del Año 3; 1 July 2023	Coscu — KO (2/3)	
Ben Williams vs Black Paddy	Kingpyn High Stakes Tournament Semifinals; 15 July 2023	Williams — TKO (1/3)	
Dollar Dec vs Golden Boyz	Kingpyn High Stakes Tournament Semifinals; 15 July 2023	Boyz — MD	
Whitney Johns vs Amber O’Donnell	Kingpyn High Stakes Tournament Semifinals; 15 July 2023	Johns — UD	
Daniella Hemsley vs Ms. Danielka	Kingpyn High Stakes Tournament Semifinals; 15 July 2023	Hemsley — UD	
Elle Brooke vs Jully Poca	Kingpyn High Stakes Tournament Semifinals; 15 July 2023	Poca — UD	
6ar6ie6 vs Emily Brooke	Kingpyn High Stakes Tournament Semifinals; 15 July 2023	6ar6ie6 — UD	
AnEsonGib vs Jarvis Khattri	Kingpyn High Stakes Tournament Semifinals; 15 July 2023	AnEsonGib — UD	
Whindersson Nunes vs King Kenny	Kingpyn High Stakes Tournament Semifinals; 15 July 2023	King Kenny — UD	
Magic Crasher vs Jack Grady	MF & DAZN: X Series 008; 22 July 2023	Grady — KO (2/4)	
Unbaer vs Corn	MF & DAZN: X Series 008; 22 July 2023	Corn — TKO (4/4)	
The AK Guy vs James Sellers	MF & DAZN: X Series 008; 22 July 2023	The AK Guy — TKO (3/4)	
Alan Belcher vs. Chase DeMoor	MF & DAZN: X Series 008; 22 July 2023	Belcher — TKO (3/3)	
Deen the Great & Walid Sharks vs YPG! (YuddyGangTV & Ayye Pap)	MF & DAZN: X Series 008; 22 July 2023	Great & Sharks — UD	
NichLmao vs Swarmz vs BDave vs Ryan Johnston	MF & DAZN: X Series 008; 22 July 2023	NichLmao — PTTS	
Jake Paul vs Nate Diaz	Jake Paul vs. Nate Diaz; 5 August 2023	Paul — UD	
Carla Jade vs Tash Weekender	MF & DAZN: X Series 009; 23 September 2023	Jade — UD	
Pully Arif vs Small Spartan Jay	MF & DAZN: X Series 009; 23 September 2023	Spartan Jay — SD	
Callum Izzard vs OJ Rosé	MF & DAZN: X Series 009; 23 September 2023	Rosé — TKO (3/4)	
Master Oogway vs Armz Korleone	MF & DAZN: X Series 009; 23 September 2023	Korleone — TKO (1/3)	
Gabriel Silva vs Ben Davis	MF & DAZN: X Series 009; 23 September 2023	Silva — KO (1/4)	
Ashley Rak-Su vs Halal Ham	MF & DAZN: X Series 009; 23 September 2023	Rak-Su — UD	
FaZe Temperrr vs Ginty	MF & DAZN: X Series 009; 23 September 2023	Temperrr — TKO (1/4)	
Astrid Wett vs Alexia Grace	MF & DAZN: X Series 10 – The Prime Card; 14 October 2023	Wett — MD	
Chase DeMoor vs Tempo Arts	MF & DAZN: X Series 10 – The Prime Card; 14 October 2023	Tempo Arts — SD	
Swarmz vs Ed Matthews	MF & DAZN: X Series 10 – The Prime Card; 14 October 2023	Matthews — KO (1/3)	
WassabiLmao vs Los Pineda Coladas (Alex Wassabi & NichLmao vs Luis Alcaraz Pineda & BDave)	MF & DAZN: X Series 10 – The Prime Card; 14 October 2023	Draw — SD	
Whindersson Nunes vs My Mate Nate	MF & DAZN: X Series 10 – The Prime Card; 14 October 2023	My Mate Nate — UD	
King Kenny vs Anthony Taylor	MF & DAZN: X Series 10 – The Prime Card; 14 October 2023	Taylor — UD	
Deen the Great vs Walid Sharks	MF & DAZN: X Series 10 – The Prime Card; 14 October 2023	Great — UD	
Salt Papi vs Slim Albaher	MF & DAZN: X Series 10 – The Prime Card; 14 October 2023	Albaher — TKO (4/5)	
Logan Paul vs Dillon Danis	MF & DAZN: X Series 10 – The Prime Card; 14 October 2023	Paul — DQ (6/6)	
KSI vs Tommy Fury	MF & DAZN: X Series 10 – The Prime Card; 14 October 2023	Fury — UD	
Adam Brooks vs Rhino	MF & DAZN: X Series 11; 17 November 2023	Brooks — KO (2/3)	
Dapper Laughs vs Simple Simon	MF & DAZN: X Series 11; 17 November 2023	Laughs — TKO (1/4)	
Uncle Pizza vs YuddyGangTV	MF & DAZN: X Series 11; 17 November 2023	YuddyGangTV — SD	
Armz Korleone vs Malcom Minikon	MF & DAZN: X Series 11; 17 November 2023	No Contest	
Gabriel Silva vs OJ Rosé	MF & DAZN: X Series 11; 17 November 2023	Silva — MD	
Jully Poca vs Alaena Vampira	MF & DAZN: X Series 11; 17 November 2023	Poca — UD	
Jarvis Khattri vs BDave	MF & DAZN: X Series 11; 17 November 2023	Khattri — UD	
Jake Paul vs Andre August	Most Valuable Prospects IV; 15 December 2023	Paul — KO (1/8)	
2024
Joey Knight vs Most Wanted	MF & DAZN: X Series 12; 20 January 2024	Knight — (3/4)	
Ben Williams vs Fes Batista	MF & DAZN: X Series 12; 20 January 2024	Williams — UD	
Small Spartan Jay vs FoxTheG	MF & DAZN: X Series 12; 20 January 2024	FoxTheG — KO (1/4)	
Tristan Hamm vs Not Logan Paul	MF & DAZN: X Series 12; 20 January 2024	Hamm — KO (1/4)	
Chase DeMoor vs Malcom Minikon	MF & DAZN: X Series 12; 20 January 2024	DeMoor — UD	
Ashley Rak-Su vs OJ Rosé	MF & DAZN: X Series 12; 20 January 2024	Draw — SD	
AJ Bunker vs Elle Brooke	MF & DAZN: X Series 12; 20 January 2024	Brooke — KO (3/4)	
Ed Mathews vs Luis Alcaraz Pineda	MF & DAZN: X Series 12; 20 January 2024	Pineda — KO (2/4)	
Jake Paul vs Ryan Bourland	Amanda Serrano vs. Nina Meinke; 2 March 2024	Paul — TKO (1/8)	
Vitaly Zdorovetskiy vs MoDeen	MF & DAZN: X Series 13; 23 March 2024	Zdorovetskiy — TKO (1/3)	
Nikki Hru vs Alexica Grace	MF & DAZN: X Series 13; 23 March 2024	Hru — UD	
Joey Knight vs Baby Hulk	MF & DAZN: X Series 13; 23 March 2024	Knight — TKO (1/5)	
YuddyGangTV vs Lil Cracra	MF & DAZN: X Series 13; 23 March 2024	No Contest — (2/5)	
Tayler Holder vs DWG Earth	MF & DAZN: X Series 13; 23 March 2024	Holder — TKO (2/5)	
FoxTheG vs Evil Hero	MF & DAZN: X Series 13; 23 March 2024	FoxTheG — TKO (1/3)	
Tempo Arts vs Ben Knights	MF & DAZN: X Series 14; 11 May 2024	Arts — TKO (5/5)	
Argentinian King vs Pully Arif	MF & DAZN: X Series 14; 11 May 2024	King — UD	
Mist vs Ryan Taylor	MF & DAZN: X Series 14; 11 May 2024	Mist — KO (1/4)	
King Kenny vs Adam Brooks	MF & DAZN: X Series 14; 11 May 2024	Kenny — TKO (2/4)	
Jully Poca vs 6ar6bie6	MF & DAZN: X Series 14; 11 May 2024	Poca — UD	
Salt Papi vs Amadeusz Ferrari	MF & DAZN: X Series 14; 11 May 2024	Papi — RTD (3/5)	
Alyisa Magen vs Fangs	MF & DAZN: X Series 15; 25 May 2024	Magen — UD	
Alaena Vampira vs Loza	MF & DAZN: X Series 15; 25 May 2024	Draw — SD	
Jeremy Park vs Anthony Vargas	MF & DAZN: X Series 15; 25 May 2024	Vargas — UD	
Lil Cracra vs YuddyGangTV	MF & DAZN: X Series 15; 25 May 2024	YuddyGangTV — UD	
Le'Veon Bell vs Tristan Hamm	MF & DAZN: X Series 15; 25 May 2024	Bell — UD	
Elle Brooke vs Paige VanZant	MF & DAZN: X Series 15; 25 May 2024	Draw — SD	
FoxTheG vs Adnan Bin Sultan	Social Knockout 3; 6 July 2024	FoxTheG — (3/3) TKO	
Salt Papi vs Dawood Savage	Social Knockout 3; 6 July 2024	Papi — KO (1/3)	
Erali Boyqobilov vs Abdu Rozik	Social Knockout 3; 6 July 2024	Draw	
Mo Vlogs vs Shero	Social Knockout 3; 6 July 2024	Vlogs — TKO (3/3)	
Carrera vs Agustin51	La Velada del Año 4; 16 July 2024	Agustin51 — UD	
Guanyar vs La Cobra	La Velada del Año 4; 16 July 2024	Cobra — TKO (3/3)	
Zeling & Nissaxter vs Amablitz & Alana	La Velada del Año 4; 16 July 2024	Amablitz & Alana — TKO (1/3)	
ViruZz vs Shelao	La Velada del Año 4; 16 July 2024	ViruZz — UD	
Karchez vs Peldanyos vs Aldo Geo vs Skain vs Unicornio vs Sezar Blue vs Roberto Cein vs Pelicanger vs Folagor	La Velada del Año 4; 16 July 2024	Karchez — 1st	
Karchez vs Peldanyos vs Aldo Geo vs Skain vs Unicornio vs Sezar Blue vs Roberto Cein vs Pelicanger vs Folagor	La Velada del Año 4; 16 July 2024	Pelicanger — 2nd	
Karchez vs Peldanyos vs Aldo Geo vs Skain vs Unicornio vs Sezar Blue vs Roberto Cein vs Pelicanger vs Folagor	La Velada del Año 4; 16 July 2024	Cein — 3rd	
YoSoyPlex vs El Mariana	La Velada del Año 4; 16 July 2024	Mariana — UD	
Jake Paul vs Mike Perry	Jake Paul vs. Mike Perry; 20 July 2024	Paul — KO (6/8)	
Leah Gotti vs Amber Fields	MF & DAZN: X Series 16; 10 August 2024	Gotti — TKO (3/4)	
YuddyGangTV vs Argentinian King	MF & DAZN: X Series 16; 10 August 2024	YuddyGangTV — UD	
Lil Cracra vs Ace Musa	MF & DAZN: X Series 16; 10 August 2024	Cracra — UD	
FaZe Temperrr vs Josh Brueckner	MF & DAZN: X Series 16; 10 August 2024	Brueckner — TKO (2/5)	
DTG vs Malcom Minikon	MF & DAZN: X Series 17; 31 August 2024	Minikon — UD	
Sami Hamed vs Jesse Clarke	MF & DAZN: X Series 17; 31 August 2024	Hamed — TKO (2/4)	
Deen the Great vs Dave Fogarty	MF & DAZN: X Series 17; 31 August 2024	Great — TKO (3/5)	
Ben Williams vs Warren Spencer	MF & DAZN: X Series 17; 31 August 2024	Williams — TKO (2/4)	
HSTikkyTokky vs George Fonson	MF & DAZN: X Series 17; 31 August 2024	HSTikkyTokky — TKO (1/3)	
Danny Aarons vs Danny Simpson	MF & DAZN: X Series 17; 31 August 2024	Draw — SD	
Idris Virgo vs Fes Batista	MF & DAZN: X Series 18 – Stake Pro Tournament Card; 14 September 2024	Virgo — TKO (1/5)	
Nikki Hru vs Carla Jade	MF & DAZN: X Series 18 – Stake Pro Tournament Card; 14 September 2024	Jade — UD	
Ashley Rak-Su vs Tristan Hamm	MF & DAZN: X Series 18 – Stake Pro Tournament Card; 14 September 2024	Rak-Su — UD	
Joey Knight vs Lil Cracra	MF & DAZN: X Series 18 – Stake Pro Tournament Card; 14 September 2024	Cracra — MD	
Goerge Stockey vs Lewis Bodwen	MF & DAZN: X Series 18 – Stake Pro Tournament Card; 14 September 2024	Bowden — UD	
Jeoy Knight vs Lil Cracra	MF & DAZN: X Series 18 – Stake Pro Tournament Card; 14 September 2024	Cracra — UD	
Jully Poca vs Crystal Pittman	MF & DAZN: X Series 18 – Stake Pro Tournament Card; 14 September 2024	Poca — UD	
Elle Brooke vs Jenny Savage	MF & DAZN: X Series 18 – Stake Pro Tournament Card; 14 September 2024	Brooke — UD	
Neeraj Goyat vs Whindersson Nunes	Jake Paul vs. Mike Tyson; 15 November 2024	Goyat — UD	
Jake Paul vs Mike Tyson	Jake Paul vs. Mike Tyson; 15 November 2024	Paul — UD	
Chase DeMoor vs Kelz	MF & DAZN: X Series 19 – Qatar: The Supercard; 28 November 2024	DeMoor — UD	
YuddyGangTV vs Lil Cracra	MF & DAZN: X Series 19 – Qatar: The Supercard; 28 November 2024	Cracra — UD	
NichLmao vs Warren Spencer	MF & DAZN: X Series 19 – Qatar: The Supercard; 28 November 2024	Spencer — MD	
Jarvis Khattri vs Ben Williams	MF & DAZN: X Series 19 – Qatar: The Supercard; 28 November 2024	Khattri — TKO (3/5)	
Deji Olatunji vs Dawood Savage	MF & DAZN: X Series 19 – Qatar: The Supercard; 28 November 2024	Olatunji — KO (3/4)	
Salt Papi vs King Kenny	MF & DAZN: X Series 19 – Qatar: The Supercard; 28 November 2024	Papi — TKO (3/6)	
AnEsonGib vs Slim Albaher	MF & DAZN: X Series 19 – Qatar: The Supercard; 28 November 2024	Gib — UD	
2025
Adam Brooks vs Gavinio	MF & DAZN: X Series 20; 18 January 2025	Brooks — KO (2/4)	
Little T vs Afghan Dan	MF & DAZN: X Series 20; 18 January 2025	T — TKO (2/3)	
Wade Plemons vs Masai Warrior	MF & DAZN: X Series 20; 18 January 2025	Plemons — UD	
Rahim Pardesi vs Feroze Khan	Rahim Pardesi vs Feroze Khan; 11 February 2025	Pardesi — SD	
Joey Knight vs Andy Howson	Misfits 21 – Blinders & Brawls; 16 May 2025	Howson — UD	
Tempo Arts vs Big Tobz vs Godson vs Curtis Pritchard	Misfits 21 – Blinders & Brawls; 16 May 2025	Arts — PTS	
Jordan Banjo vs Wil Anderson	Misfits 21 – Blinders & Brawls; 16 May 2025	Banjo — TKO (4/4)	
Wakey Wines vs MoDeen	Misfits 21 – Blinders & Brawls; 16 May 2025	Wines — UD	
Walid Sharks vs FoxTheG	Misfits 21 – Blinders & Brawls; 16 May 2025	FoxTheG — UD	
Chase DeMoor vs Tank Tolman	Misfits 21 – Blinders & Brawls; 16 May 2025	DeMoor — TKO (3/5)	
Mervan Tepelioğlu vs Mustafa Ak	Mervan Tepelioğlu vs. Mustafa Ak; 26 June 2025	Tepelioğlu — TKO (3/4)	
Jake Paul vs Julio César Chávez Jr.	Jake Paul vs Julio César Chávez Jr. 28 June 2025	Paul — UD	
Peereira7 vs Rivaldios	La Velada del Año V 26 July 2025	Peereira7 — UD	
Alana Floresf vs Ari Geli	La Velada del Año V 26 July 2025	Alana — SD	
Perxitaa vs Gaspi	La Velada del Año V 26 July 2025	Perxitaa — TKO (1/3)	
Abby vs RoRo Bueno	La Velada del Año V 26 July 2025	Abby — SD	
ViruZz vs Tomás Mazza	La Velada del Año V 26 July 2025	ViruZz — UD	
AndoniFitness vs Carlos Belcast	La Velada del Año V 26 July 2025	AndoniFitness — SD	
TheGrefg vs Westcol	La Velada del Año V 26 July 2025	TheGrefg — TKO (3/3)	
Chase DeMoor vs Natan Marcoń	Misfits 22 – Ring of Thrones; 30 August 2025	DeMoor — TKO (2/5)	
Amadeusz Ferrari vs Rahim Pardesi	Misfits 22 – Ring of Thrones; 30 August 2025	Pardesi — KO (4/4)	
Joey Essex vs Numeiro	Misfits 22 – Ring of Thrones; 30 August 2025	Essex — MD	
Tony Ferguson vs Salt Papi	Misfits 22 – Ring of Thrones; 30 August 2025	Ferguson — TKO (3/5)	
The Niño vs ByKing	Stream Fighters 4; 19 October 2025	The Niño — UD	
Milica Ybañez vs May Osorio	Stream Fighters 4; 19 October 2025	Ybañez — UD	
Shelao vs BelosMaki	Stream Fighters 4; 19 October 2025	Shelao — KO (2/4)	
Karely Ruiz vs Karina García	Stream Fighters 4; 19 October 2025	Ruiz — TKO (3/4)	
JH de la Cruz vs CristoRata	Stream Fighters 4; 19 October 2025	Cruz — RTD	
Andrea Valdiri vs Yina Calderón	Stream Fighters 4; 19 October 2025	Valdiri — TKO (1/4)	
Argentinian King vs Small Spartan Jay	MF Duel: Cracra vs Fox; 9 November 2025	King — UD	
BDave vs Rob Stewart Son	MF Duel: Cracra vs Fox; 9 November 2025	BDave — KO (1/3)	
Jully Poca vs Monica Medina	MF Duel: Cracra vs Fox; 9 November 2025	Poca — MD	
Lil Cracra vs FoxTheG	MF Duel: Cracra vs Fox; 9 November 2025	FoxTheG — UD	
Jake Paul vs Anthony Joshua	Jake Paul vs. Anthony Joshua; 19 December 2025	Joshua — KO (6/8)	
Ben Williams vs NichLmao	Misfits Mania – The Fight Before Christmas; 20 December 2025	Williams — UD	
Deen the Great vs Amado Vargas	Misfits Mania – The Fight Before Christmas; 20 December 2025	Vargas — UD	
Tony Ferguson vs Warren Spencer	Misfits Mania – The Fight Before Christmas; 20 December 2025	Ferguson — UD	
Andrew Tate vs Chase DeMoor	Misfits Mania – The Fight Before Christmas; 20 December 2025	DeMoor — MD	
2026
OJ Rosé vs Andy Savage	Adin Ross Presents: BrandRisk 12; 23 January 2026	Rosé — TKO (3/4)	
Chibu vs Arab Tyson	Adin Ross Presents: BrandRisk 12; 23 January 2026	Chibu — UD	
Ximena Vazquez vs Daryn Harris	Adin Ross Presents: BrandRisk 12; 23 January 2026	Harris — UD	
Scam Likely vs YK Osiris	Adin Ross Presents: BrandRisk 12; 23 January 2026	Likely — TKO (3/3)	
Adam22 vs Jason Luv	Adin Ross Presents: BrandRisk 12; 23 January 2026	Luv — KO (1/3)	
Jordan Banjo vs Tempo Arts	MF Duel 2; 7 March 2026	Banjo — TKO (4/4)	
Walid Sharks vs Argentinian King	MF Duel 2; 7 March 2026	Sharks — (2/4)	
Noneck Jay vs Jboolin	Adin Ross Presents: BrandRisk 13; 16 March 2026	Jay — RTD (2/4)	
GypsyCrusader vs Supah Hot Fire	Adin Ross Presents: BrandRisk 13; 16 March 2026	Crusader — SD	
Blueface vs Chibu	Adin Ross Presents: BrandRisk 13; 16 March 2026	Chibu — UD	
FoxTheG vs Pully Arif	Fame Fighting vs. Misfits Boxing; 6 June 2026	FoxTheG — UD	
Tobias Pietrek vs Josh Brueckner	Fame Fighting vs. Misfits Boxing; 6 June 2026	Brueckner — TKO (1/4)	
Tommy Pedroni vs Fes Batistia	Fame Fighting vs. Misfits Boxing; 6 June 2026	Pedroni — TKO (3/4)	
MckyTV vs Temperrr	Fame Fighting vs. Misfits Boxing; 6 June 2026	Temperrr — UD	
Ediz Tasci vs Dad	Fame Fighting vs. Misfits Boxing; 6 June 2026	Tasci — TKO (1/4)	
Can Kaplan vs Slim Albaher	Fame Fighting vs. Misfits Boxing; 6 June 2026	Kaplan — TKO (4/4)	
Aleks Petrović vs Chase DeMoor	Fame Fighting vs. Misfits Boxing; 6 June 2026	DeMoor — UD	
Sheena Bathory vs Tina Snow	Misfits 23 – Beauty vs. The Beast; 13 June 2026	Bathory — TKO (1/4)	
Adam Brooks vs Rahim Pardesi	Misfits 23 – Beauty vs. The Beast; 13 June 2026	Brooks — UD	
Ibiza Final Boss vs Jordan McCann	Misfits 23 – Beauty vs. The Beast; 13 June 2026	Ibiza — MD	
Swarmz vs Biel	Misfits 23 – Beauty vs. The Beast; 13 June 2026	Swarmz — TKO (2/3)	
Big Stacks vs Armz Korleone	Misfits 23 – Beauty vs. The Beast; 13 June 2026	Korleone — TKO (4/4)	
Jully Poca vs Monica Medina	MVPW-04; 13 June 2026	Poca — UD	
Fabiana Sevillano vs La Parce	La Velada del Año VI; 25 July 2026	La Parce — SD	
Clersss vs NataliaMX	La Velada del Año VI; 25 July 2026	Natalia MX — UD	
Edu Aguirre vs Gastón Edul	La Velada del Año VI; 25 July 2026	Aguirre — SD	
Marta Díaz vs Tatiana Kaer	La Velada del Año VI; 25 July 2026	Díaz — SD	
Viruzz vs Gero Arias	La Velada del Año VI; 25 July 2026	Arias — UD	
Alondrissa vs Angie Velasco	La Velada del Año VI; 25 July 2026	Velasco — UD	
Lit Killah vs Kidd Keo	La Velada del Año VI; 25 July 2026	Lit Killah — UD	
Roro Bueno vs Samy Rivers	La Velada del Año VI; 25 July 2026	Bueno — UD	
Plex vs Fernanfloo	La Velada del Año VI; 25 July 2026	Plex — UD	
IlloJuan vs TheGrefg	La Velada del Año VI; 25 July 2026	TheGrefg — SD	
No Neck Jay vs Frankie Lapenna	Adin Ross Presents: BrandRisk 15; 22 August 2026	Jay — UD	
Supha Hot Fire vs Supreme Patty	Adin Ross Presents: BrandRisk 15; 22 August 2026	Supha Hot Fire — UD	
Bob Menery vs YK Osiris	Adin Ross Presents: BrandRisk 15; 22 August 2026	No Contest — (1/3)	
Larry Wheels vs Vitaly Zdorovetskiy	Adin Ross Presents: BrandRisk 15; 22 August 2026	No Contest — (1/3)	
Austin McBroom vs Temperrr	Adin Ross Presents: BrandRisk 15; 22 August 2026	McBroom — KO (1/4)	
Jully Poca vs Cinderella Linnear	MVPW: Serrano vs. Manzur; 21 August 2026	Linnear — SD	
Chase DeMoor vs Kevin Nagle	DeMoor vs Nagle; 29 August 2026	DeMoor — TKO (5/8)	
Jack Grady vs Wade Stokan	Duel Arena 1; 29 August 2026	Grady — TKO (1/3)	
Freak Bob vs Kinkki	Duel Arena 1; 29 August 2026	No Contest	
Amelia Hewitt def. Kimbo Bimbo	McCann vs. Stacks; 12 September 2026	Hewitt — (3/3)	
Armz Korleone vs Kelz	McCann vs. Stacks; 12 September 2026	Korleone — MD	
Warren Spencer vs Ashley Rak-Su	McCann vs. Stacks; 12 September 2026	Rak-Su — SD	
Nitboy vs Kane West	McCann vs. Stacks; 12 September 2026	Nitboy — UD	
Ibiza Final Boss def. Kellen Jenkins	McCann vs. Stacks; 12 September 2026	Ibiza — SD	
Jordan McCann vs Big Stacks	McCann vs. Stacks; 12 September 2026	Stacks — TKO (2/4)	
Upcoming
FoxTheG vs. Justin Ibarrola	Cejudo vs. Walton; 26 September 2026	—N/a	
Cherdleys vs. Dad	Cejudo vs. Walton; 26 September 2026	—N/a	
Dawson Myles Barret vs. Louis Russell	Cejudo vs. Walton; 26 September 2026	—N/a	
Carla Jade vs. Erika Night	Essex vs. Dapper; 10 October 2026	—N/a	
Nitboy & Kane West vs. Cracky Tokky & Little T	Essex vs. Dapper; 10 October 2026	—N/a	
Leaks World vs. TBA	Essex vs. Dapper; 10 October 2026	—N/a	
Big Stacks vs. Tom Skinner	Essex vs. Dapper; 10 October 2026	—N/a	
Chase DeMoor vs. Plinio Cruz	Essex vs. Dapper; 10 October 2026	—N/a	
Momo vs. TBA	Parense de Manos IV; 18 December 2026	—N/a	
Agusneta vs. Bruneger	Parense de Manos IV; 18 December 2026	—N/a	
Luli González vs Cami Mayan	Parense de Manos IV; 18 December 2026	—N/a	
Brian Sarmiento vs El Polaco	Parense de Manos IV; 18 December 2026	—N/a	
Bauleti vs Balanza	Parense de Manos IV; 18 December 2026	—N/a	
Prii Mora vs Albere	Parense de Manos IV; 18 December 2026	—N/a	
Renzo Pantich vs Joaco López	Parense de Manos IV; 18 December 2026	—N/a	
Mármol vs Mortedor	Parense de Manos IV; 18 December 2026	—N/a	
Milica vs Arigeli	Parense de Manos IV; 18 December 2026	—N/a	
Shelao vs Andoni	Parense de Manos IV; 18 December 2026	—N/a	

== Chess boxing ==
Match	Event	Result	Ref.
2Saint vs Spud	Mogul Chessboxing Championship; 11 December 2022	2Saint — TKO (2/7)	
Fiction vs KJH	Mogul Chessboxing Championship; 11 December 2022	Fiction — SSB (5/7)	
Nathan Stanz vs BoxBox	Mogul Chessboxing Championship; 11 December 2022	BoxBox — RTD (4/7)	
Abroad in Japan vs Overtflow	Mogul Chessboxing Championship; 11 December 2022	Abroad — Time Adv. (7/7)	
HugS vs Toph	Mogul Chessboxing Championship; 11 December 2022	HugS — TKO (2/7)	
IM Lawrence Trent vs GM Aman Hambleton	Mogul Chessboxing Championship; 11 December 2022	Hambleton — TKO (2/7)	
Andrea Botez vs Dina Belenkaya	Mogul Chessboxing Championship; 11 December 2022	Belenkaya — Checkmate (7/7)	
Myth vs Cherdleys	Mogul Chessboxing Championship; 11 December 2022	Myth — Time Adv. (7/7)	
Disguised Toast vs PointCrow	Mogul Chessboxing Championship; 11 December 2022	Toast — Checkmate (7/7)	
Sardoche vs Leo Guirlet	Intellectual Fight Club #3; 3 February 2023	Sardoche — TKO (10/11)	
Sardoche vs Alex Turalski	Intellectual Fight Club #4; 28 May 2023	Sardoche — Checkmate (7/11)	
Sardoche vs Nicolo Tiraboschi	WCBO - World Chessboxing Championships 2023; 28 October 2023	Tiraboschi — Checkmate (5/10)	
Sardoche vs Marco Muccini	Intellectual Fight Club #5; 18 May 2024	Muccini — Time Adv. (9/10)	

== Bare-knuckle boxing ==
Match	Event	Result	Ref.
Bryce Hall vs Gee Perez	Bare Knuckle Fighting Championship 48: Albuquerque; 11 August 2023	Hall — TKO	
Oscar Willis vs Ben Davis	BKFC on DAZN: Tenaglia vs. Soto; 12 October 2024	Willis — TKO	

== See also ==
- KSI vs Jake Paul
- White-collar boxing
