= Balloon World Cup =

Tournament based on a balloon keep-up game

The Balloon World Cup is an event organized by Spanish celebrities Ibai Llanos and Gerard Piqué, based on a viral balloon keep-up game on social media.

== Background ==
Ibai was inspired to organize the tournament by a video of American siblings Antonio, Diego and Isabel Arredondo playing a game of keep-up with a balloon in their Canby, Oregon home, which Ibai tweeted with the caption "I want to buy the rights to this and set up a World Cup." Antonio and Diego attended the tournament in Spain to represent the United States, but Diego was eliminated early after a first-round loss to Cuba's Eric Guzmán González.

== Staff ==
Llanos enlisted several panelists of Spanish sports talk show El chiringuito de Jugones for the event's staff, including former La Liga assistant referee Rafa Guerrero as one of the referees for the tournament's matches, and Alfredo Duro, Jorge D'Alessandro and Ander Cortés as commentators.

Person	Role
Ibai Llanos	Announcing team
Gerard Piqué	Announcing team
Alfredo Duro	Announcing team
Jorge D'Alessandro	Announcing team
Ander Cortés	Announcing team
Rafa Guerrero	Referees
Franc Tormo	Referees
Xavi Sánchez	Referees
Nacho Tellado	Assistant referee
Cristóbal Soria	Delegate

In 2022:

Person	Role
Ibai Llanos	Announcers
José Riobó	Announcers
Ander Cortés	Announcers
Suzyroxx	Pre-show interviewers
Sekiam	Pre-show interviewers
Rafa Guerrero	Referees
Sandra Adell	Referees
Franc Tormo	Referees
Nacho Tellado	Assistant referee

== Competition rules ==
- Matches last for 2 minutes, except for the final, which lasts 5 minutes.
- Players touch the balloon with their hands, launching it upwards.
- Players can only touch the balloon once before their opponent touch it.
- Players are awarded a point when their opponent fails to touch the balloon before it hits the ground.
- The player who has scored the most points when time runs out wins the match.
- If the two players are tied when time runs out, they go to an overtime where they must use their head and feet instead of the hands to touch the balloon; the first player to score a point wins the match.

== Format ==
In spite of the championship having initially been announced as a 24-country tournament with a group stage that would ensure every participant played at least two matches, this was abandoned when the field was expanded to 32 participants, opting instead for a single knockout tournament. All matches were played inside a glass cage that contained a number of pieces of furniture acting as obstacles, and simulating the home environment in which the keep-up game is usually played.

== 2021 ==
2021 Balloon World Cup
- Venue: PortAventura Convention Centre
- Location: Vila-seca, Tarragona, Spain
- Date: 14 October 2021
- Competitors: 32 from 32 nations

Medalists
gold medal	Francesco de la Cruz	Peru
silver medal	Jan Spiess	Germany
bronze medal	Jan Franquesa	Spain

The 2021 Balloon World Cup is the first edition of the event. It was held on 14 October 2021, at the convention center in the PortAventura World resort in the province of Tarragona. The tournament was broadcast live in its entirety on Llanos's Twitch channel, and culminated with Peruvian Francesco de la Cruz defeating German Jan Spiess in the final.

After Francesco de la Cruz won the tournament, he was congratulated on social media by President of Peru Pedro Castillo.

=== Competitors ===
All of the competitors were announced as the representatives of their country.

Competitor	Country
Walid Seddiki	Algeria
Ramon Cierco	Andorra
Elián Barrado	Argentina
Gor Khechoyan	Armenia
Israel Quispe	Bolivia
Diego Mendez	Brazil
Tsetevan Mladenov	Bulgaria
Felipe Pávez	Chile
Funtxi Ursua Zhang	China
Tarik	Colombia
Eric Guzmán González	Cuba
Matías Boho	Equatorial Guinea
Pol Jorquera	France
Tamaz Tsagareishvili	Georgia
Jan Spiess	Germany
Momo Benavides	Italy
Luis "Pollo" Forzan	Mexico
Gerelt-Od Tserennorov	Mongolia
Yahya El Hajouji	Morocco
Javi Damas	Netherlands
Raúl Eduardo Giménez	Paraguay
Francesco de la Cruz	Peru
Ricardo Ferreira	Portugal
Yana Rudenko	Russia
Pape Ndour	Senegal
Jan Franquesa	Spain
Nicklas Hallback	Sweden
Andrii Mostavchuk	Ukraine
Moses Duckrell	United Kingdom
Diego Arredondo	United States
Isaac "Suko" Leal	Uruguay
Raúl David Carrero	Venezuela

=== Replaced competitors ===
Name	Country	Reason for replacement	Substitute
Marco Fiorillo	Italy	Tested positive for COVID-19 prior to the event	Gerónimo "Momo" Benavides

=== Tournament bracket ===
Round of 32
(Peru) Francesco de la Cruz	6
(Bulgaria) Tsetevan Mladenov	4
(Mongolia) Gerelt-Od Tserennorov	3
(Mexico) Luis "Pollo" Forzan	1
(Georgia (country)) Tamaz Tsagareishvili	3
(Paraguay) Raúl Eduardo Giménez	2
(Algeria) Walid Seddiki	2
(Argentina) Elián Barrado	5
(Sweden) Nicklas Hallback	4
(Morocco) Yahya El Hajouji	6
(Italy) Momo Benavides	2
(China) Funtxi Ursua Zhang	1
(United States) Diego Arredondo	2
(Cuba) Eric Guzmán González	4
(Spain) Jan Franquesa	2
(Uruguay) Isaac "Suko" Leal	1
(Brazil) Diego Mendez	3
(Venezuela) Raúl David Carrero	1
(Netherlands) Javi Damas	4
(Ukraine) Andrii Mostavchuk	3
(Portugal) Ricardo Ferreira	7
(Armenia) Gor Khechoyan	2
(Bolivia) Israel Quispe	4
(Russia) Yana Rudenko	2
(United Kingdom) Moses Duckrell	3
(Equatorial Guinea) Matías Boho	5
(Andorra) Ramon Cierco	7
(France) Pol Jorquera	6
(Senegal) Pape Ndour	4
(Chile) Felipe Pávez	3
(Germany) Jan Spiess	3
(Colombia) Tarik	1

Round of 16
(Peru) Francesco de la Cruz	3
(Mongolia) Gerelt-Od Tserennorov	2
(Georgia (country)) Tamaz Tsagareishvili	1
(Argentina) Elián Barrado	4
(Morocco) Yahya El Hajouji	6
(Italy) Momo Benavides	4
(Cuba) Eric Guzmán González	5
(Spain) Jan Franquesa	6
(Brazil) Diego Mendez	5
(Netherlands) Javi Damas	4
(Portugal) Ricardo Ferreira	2
(Bolivia) Israel Quispe	3
(Equatorial Guinea) Matías Boho	1
(Andorra) Ramon Cierco	6
(Senegal) Pape Ndour	1
(Germany) Jan Spiess	5

Quarterfinals
(Peru) Francesco de la Cruz	2
(Argentina) Elián Barrado	1
(Morocco) Yahya El Hajouji	2
(Spain) Jan Franquesa	4
(Brazil) Diego Mendez	3
(Bolivia) Israel Quispe	1
(Andorra) Ramon Cierco	0
(Germany) Jan Spiess	1

Semifinals
(Peru) Francesco de la Cruz	2
(Spain) Jan Franquesa	1
(Brazil) Diego Mendez	1
(Germany) Jan Spiess	4

Final
(Peru) Francesco de la Cruz	6
(Germany) Jan Spiess	2
Bronze medal match
(Spain) Jan Franquesa	6
(Brazil) Diego Mendez	4

=== Awards and nominations ===
Year	Ceremony	Category	Result	Ref.
2021	ESLAND Awards	Best Event of the Year	Nominated	
2021	The Streamer Awards	Best Streamed Event	Nominated	

== 2022 ==
2022 Balloon World Cup
- Venue: PortAventura Convention Centre
- Location: Vila-seca, Tarragona, Spain
- Date: 27 October 2022
- Competitors: 16 from 16 nations

Medalists
gold medal	Miguel Imbroda	Spain
silver medal	Claudio Lassance	Brazil
bronze medal	Lautaro Maqueda	Argentina

The 2022 Balloon World Cup is the second edition of the Balloon World Cup, a sporting event organized by Ibai Llanos and Gerard Piqué, based on a game of keep-up with a balloon that went viral on social media. This was the first edition for which national qualifying tournaments were held.

The tournament was held on 27 October 2022, at the PortAventura Convention Centre in Vila-seca, Tarragona, the same venue that had hosted the first World Cup the year prior. The number of entering countries was reduced from 32 to 16, with defending champion Francesco de la Cruz being the only returning player. Spain's Miguel Imbroda was crowned world champion defeating Brazil's Claudio Lassance in the final.

=== Participants ===
2021 World Cup champion Francesco de la Cruz was announced as a participant during the Spanish qualifier. In September 2022, national qualifiers for multiple Latin American countries were announced as well.

Competitor	Country
Lautaro Maqueda	Argentina
Claudio Lassance	Brazil
Monte Doebel-Hickok	Canada
Gabriela Amaro Salazar	Chile
Jorge Alba Ortiz	Colombia
Clément Dumais	France
Vanessa Klein	Germany
Joseph Romano	Italy
Gerardo Nocedal	Mexico
Dion de Brouwer	Netherlands
Francesco de la Cruz	Peru
Gustavo Cardoso	Portugal
Miguel Imbroda	Spain
Ogeday Girișken	Turkey
Thomas Hughes	United Kingdom
Keem Kim	United States

=== National qualifiers ===
==== Spain ====
The Spanish national qualifier was held on 3 July 2022 at Fira de Barcelona in L'Hospitalet de Llobregat, as part of the third and final day of the 2022 U-Beat Live Fest. Jan Franquesa, who won the bronze medal for Spain at the 2021 World Cup, took part in the tournament, but was eliminated in the first round.

Round of 16
Pere Marquès	3
David Palanques	2
Ricard Brufau	4
Cristina Homet	1
Yeray Veróniz	1
Hugo Ramírez	3
Adrián Pérez	4
Joel Gafarot	2
Evilmoon	2
Javi Domingo	9
Miguel Imbroda	4
Marc Páez	2
Jan Franquesa	0
Àlex Pérez	4
Alex Aymerich	5
Judith Pelejero	4

Quarterfinals
Pere Marquès	4
Ricard Brufau	7
Hugo Ramírez	1
Adrián Pérez	2
Javi Domingo	0
Miguel Imbroda	2
Àlex Pérez	0
Alex Aymerich	2

Semi-finals
Ricard Brufau	3
Adrián Pérez	4
Miguel Imbroda	4
Alex Aymerich	3

Final
Adrián Pérez	2
Miguel Imbroda	7

==== Chile ====
National qualifiers for Chile, Argentina, Mexico, Brazil and Colombia were held concurrently in Buenos Aires, Argentina, between 17 and 18 September 2022.

Quarterfinals		Semifinals		Final
Matheo Jara Ziller	2
Gonzalo Pauchard Silva	3	Gonzalo Pauchard Silva	4
Mario Espinoza	4	Olavia Paz Campos	0
Olavia Paz Campos	5			Gonzalo Pauchard Silva	4
Gabriela Amaro Salazar	2			Gabriela Amaro Salazar	6
Lorena Castillo Bordón	0	Gabriela Amaro Salazar	4
Manuel Raggio Tocol	5	Manuel Raggio Tocol	0
Yasna Leiva Cortés	1

==== Argentina ====
Quarterfinals		Semifinals		Final
Lautaro Maqueda Channame	3
Santiago Rodríguez Zahn	0	Lautaro Maqueda Channame	1
Milagros Mansilla	3	Milagros Mansilla	0
Anabella Gamboa	2			Lautaro Maqueda Channame	5
Luca Prezioso	1			Juanfrancisco Suárez	4
Facundo Sgro	2	Facundo Sgro	0
Juanfrancisco Suárez	1	Juanfrancisco Suárez	2
Martiniano Fontanelle	0

==== Colombia ====
Quarterfinals		Semifinals		Final
Víctor Fabián Aldana	4
Braian Ramírez Masmela	0	Víctor Fabián Aldana	2
Robert Mendoza Ospina	3	Robert Mendoza Ospina	4
Fabián Vera	2			Robert Mendoza Ospina	1
Wilder Portocarrero González	4			Jorge Alba Ortiz	6
Johan Bermúdez Viasus	1	Wilder Portocarrero González	1
Jorge Alba Ortiz	1	Jorge Alba Ortiz	3
Yisel Morales	0

==== Mexico ====
Quarterfinals		Semifinals		Final
Luis Fernando Montoya	1
Estefanía Yvonne Farias	2	Estefanía Yvonne Farias	0
María Fernanda Rayna	0	José Daniel Trejo	1
José Daniel Trejo	1			José Daniel Trejo	0
Luis Gerardo Ortega Nocedal	2			Luis Gerardo Ortega Nocedal	2
Silvio Miguel Suárez	1	Luis Gerardo Ortega Nocedal	2
José Miguel Caro	1	José Miguel Caro	1
Jorge Mandujano	0

==== Brazil ====
Quarterfinals		Semifinals		Final
Cléber Francisco dos Santos	0
Agda Balestra	1	Agda Balestra	2
Isla Montalier Queiroz	1	Isla Montalier Queiroz	1
Natalí de Andrae Oliveira	0			Agda Balestra	3
Daiane Alves Villaboes	3			Claudio Lassance	4
Alexander Souza do Nascimento	1	Daiane Alves Villaboes	0
Lucas Rubín	0	Claudio Lassance	2
Claudio Lassance	4

==== United States ====
National qualifiers for the United States and Canada took place on 7 October 2022 as part of the first day of the TwitchCon event in San Diego, California, United States.

Quarterfinals		Semifinals		Final
Alixxa	1
MeesterKeem	3	MeesterKeem	2
CookSux	1	JoeyKaotyk	1
JoeyKaotyk	6			MeesterKeem	6
Smirky	0			Nesua	0
Nesua	2	Nesua	2
Britanny	0	DailyDasher	0
DailyDasher	1

==== Canada ====
Quarterfinals		Semifinals		Final
P1kapeach	0
Coco_chm	4	Coco_chm	0
TheWildLatina	1	MDee14	4
MDee14	2			MDee14	4
GuhRL	1			Dreads	9
Zummmers (Note: The match was abandoned after the first point due to an injury sustained by Zummmers.)	0	GuhRL	1
ParkenHarbor	2	Dreads	2
Dreads	3

=== Tournament bracket ===
The draw to determine the first-round matchups and the tournament bracket was held on 26 October 2022.

Round of 16
(Chile) Gabriela Amaro	2
(Germany) Vanessa Klein	3
(Brazil) Claudio Lassance	3
(United Kingdom) Thomas Hughes	2
(Canada) Monte Doebel-Hickok	3
(Peru) Francesco de la Cruz	0
(Argentina) Lautaro Maqueda	3
(Mexico) Gerardo Nocedal	0
(Turkey) Ogeday Girişken	0
(Netherlands) Dion de Brouwer	1
(Spain) Miguel Imbroda	3
(Colombia) Jorge Alba	2
(Italy) Joseph Romano	1
(Portugal) Gustavo Cardoso	3
(France) Clément Dumais	4
(United States) Keem Kim	1

Quarterfinals
(Germany) Vanessa Klein	1
(Brazil) Claudio Lassance	2
(Canada) Monte Doebel-Hickok	1
(Argentina) Lautaro Maqueda	2
(Netherlands) Dion de Brouwer	0
(Spain) Miguel Imbroda	2
(Portugal) Gustavo Cardoso	1
(France) Clément Dumais	3

Semi-finals
(Brazil) Claudio Lassance	3
(Argentina) Lautaro Maqueda	0
(Spain) Miguel Imbroda	3
(France) Clément Dumais	2

Final
(Brazil) Claudio Lassance	2
(Spain) Miguel Imbroda	4
Bronze medal match
(Argentina) Lautaro Maqueda	3
(France) Clément Dumais	2
