= Supernova Strikers =

Amateur boxing event based in Mexico

Information
- First date: August 17, 2025
- Last date: 2026

Events
- Total events: 2

Fights
- Total fights: 11

Supernova Strikers is a Mexican amateur boxing event between celebrities and streamers, created by Miguel Angel Fox. It took place on August 17 at the Palacio de los Deportes in Mexico City.

Due to its nature as an event, it has been compared to La Velada del Año. Some media outlets even reported that the Supernova had surpassed its Spanish counterpart in terms of attendance.

== History ==
Supernova Strikers is a boxing event created and produced by Miguel Angel Fox Muller, a television producer who has worked for Televisa and made his debut in 1997 when he produced El espacio de Tatiana. Fox said that the inspiration for creating the event comes largely from the success of La velada del Año, the amateur boxing event organized by Spanish streamer Ibai Llanos.

Five fights have been announced for this event, featuring actress Gala Montes against content creator Alana Flores, who has previously competed in amateur boxing. Other announced fights include MMA fighter Luis "Pride" Escudero against Chilean model and influencer Cristobál Álvarez "Shelao"; and comedian Franco Escamilla against YouTuber Alex "Escorpión Dorado" Montiel.

== Events ==
=== Supernova Strikers: Origenes (2025) ===
Supernova Strikers: Origenes fights
			Method	Round
(Mexico) Alana Flores	def.	(Mexico) Gala Montes	Decision (Unanimous)	3
(Mexico) Franco Escamilla	def.	(Mexico) Alex Montiel	Decision (Split)	3
(Mexico) Mario Bautista	def.	(Colombia) Westcol	TKO (Punches)	2
(Argentina) Milica	def.	(Mexico) Mercedes Roa	Decision (Unanimous)	3
(Mexico) Luis Escudero	def.	(Chile) Shelao	KO (Punch)	3

=== Supernova Strikers: Génesis (2026) ===
Supernova Strikers: Génesis fights
			Method	Round
(Argentina) Milica	def.	(Mexico) Kim Shantal	Decision (Unanimous)	3
(Mexico) Abraham Flores	def.	(Venezuela) José Broianigo	TKO (Punches)	2
(United States) Guillermo Peña	def.	(Mexico) Victor Ordoñez	TKO (Punches)	2
(Mexico) Karely Ruiz	def.	(Mexico) Kim Shantal	Decision (Split)	3
(Mexico) Aarón Mercury	def.	(Mexico) Mario Bautista	KO (Punch)	1
(Argentina) Florencia Vigna	def.	(Mexico) Alana Flores	Decision (Unanimous)	3

*In the first fight, Ari Geli had to withdraw from the event due to health problems, afterwards, the organizers announced that Kim Shantal would be Milica's rival.

*In the third fight, Karely Ruiz replaced Lupita Villalobos because she had to withdraw from the event after being diagnosed with a subdural hematoma.

== Performances ==
Artists (2025)
(Mexico) Alan Arrieta
(Mexico) Xavi
(Mexico) Christian Nodal
(Mexico) Gabito Ballesteros
(Argentina) Maria Becerra

Artists (2026)
(Mexico) Carin León
(Puerto Rico) Ozuna
(Mexico) Óscar Maydón
(Mexico) Victor Mendivil
(Mexico) Omar Camacho

== Impact ==
Supernova Strikers was a huge success, with a total of 20 thousand attendees at the Palacio de los Deportes and 4 million subscribers at its peak. The event surpassed 10 million viewers across the various platforms it was broadcast on, surpassing the 9 million viewers its Spanish counterpart, La Velada del Año, had achieved weeks earlier.

Across the broadcasts, DAZN recorded 4.3 million viewers.
