= JoeyKaotyk =

Taiwanese-American Twitch streamer

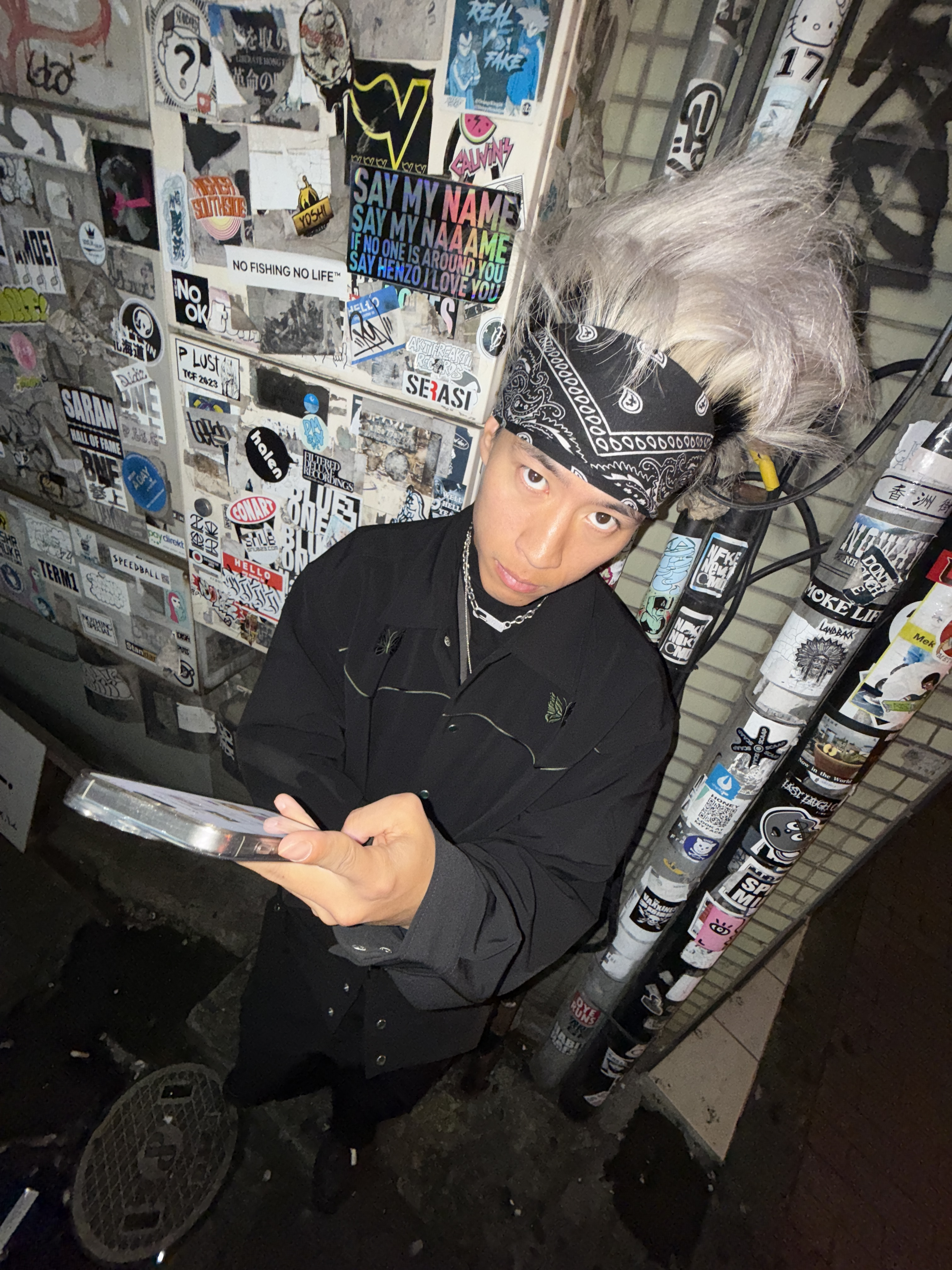

JoeyKaotyk (pronounced Joey chaotic), also known as Joey Kao, is a Taiwanese-American livestreamer and content creator. He is one of the first IRL streamers on (In real life)Twitch. He is the founder of Thirdpeek.

== Early life and career ==
Joey Kao was born into a Taiwanese family and emigrated to the West Coast of the United States in 2005. After graduating, he worked for two years at Tiffany & Co. before transitioning into full-time content creation. Before his streaming career, he was an active breakdancer (B-boy) and competed in international events.

Joey started livestreaming in his bedroom in California titled "Follow = Backflip" which kickstarted his streaming career. It wasn't until a few months after he started taking his livestreams to outdoor IRL.

== Controversies ==
In 2023, Fukushima Trespassing and Arrest, JoeyKaotyk was arrested in Japan after allegedly trespassing in an abandoned area near the Fukushima nuclear plant during a livestream. He was detained by Japanese authorities for 35 days, and his case gained international attention. Later, all charges were dropped against him.

In 2022, he had an altercation with a street performer dressed as Mickey Mouse while streaming on the Las Vegas Strip.

In 2021, he confronted a racist passerby inside an LA store who started mocking his Asian heritage with a fake accent and one in Paris who called him a slur.

== Awards and nominations ==
- 2024: Twitch Rivals Ultimate Challenge champion
- 2023: nominated for Best IRL Streamer at The Streamer Award
- 2022: semi-finalist in Balloon World Cup national qualifiers for the United States
- 2021: Streamer of the Year at the Lion Awards
