= Perxitaa =

Spanish YouTuber and live streamer (born 1991)

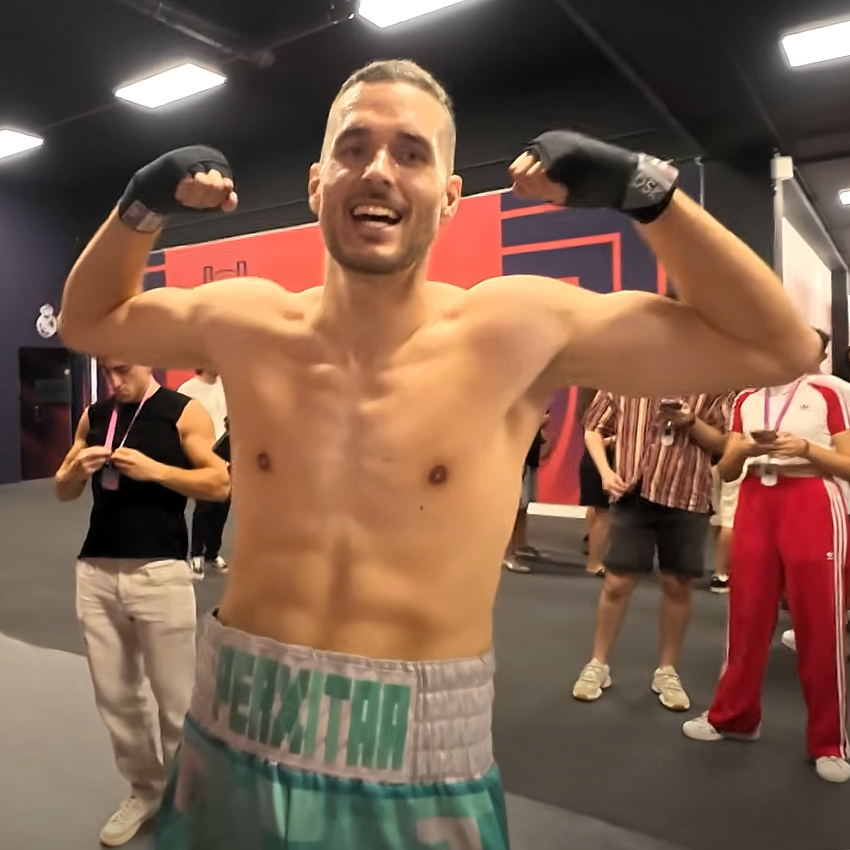
- Perxitaa at La Velada del Año 5
- Born: Jaume Cremades Gradolí; July 9, 1991 (age 35); Catarroja, Spain
- Occupations: Twitch streamer; YouTuber; Gamer

Twitch information
- Channel: Perxitaa
- Genre: Gaming
- Followers: 2.6 million

YouTube information
- Channel: perxitaa
- Subscribers: 2.52 million
- Views: 437 million
- Last updated: 13 October 2024

Jaume Cremades Gradolí, known as Perxitaa, (9 July 1991) is a Spanish YouTuber, gamer and Twitch streamer.

He studied a bachelor's degree in architecture. He started to do Minecraft streaming videos as a hobby, and in 2015 he got 400,000 subscriptions, in 2019 1,700,000 and in 2022 2,580,000. He is dating with Violeta.

In 2017 he wrote El mundo de Violeta, published by Roca Juvenil, which is about a secret story of Violeta, an imaginary character who helps Perxitaa with YouTube videos and gameplays. He previously wrote Cómo trolear en Internet.

He is the president of Los Troncos FC, a Kings League team. In April 2024 he sold the 15% of the team in a value of €600,000 to an anonymous purchaser. In November 2024 she was a participant in the Twitch series Squid Craft Games 3, where he lost against SoyPan in the final.

On 26 July 2025, he participated in La Velada del Año 5, the fifth event of the La Velada del Año, an annual boxing competition featuring various online personalities. He won his match with Gaspi, who he knocked out in the first round.
