= Marta Díaz =

Spanish social media celebrity (born 2000)

- Marta Díaz in 2026
- Born: Marta Díaz García; 30 October 2000 (age 26); Sevilla, Spain
- Occupation: Internet celebrity
- Partner(s): Sergio Reguilón (2019–2023), Marlon Lundgren Garcia (2025)
- Relatives: David Díaz (brother)
- Awards: Best Lifestyle Herbs (Forbes, 2022); Ídolo Lifestyle Award (Forbes, 2023)

Marta Díaz García (30 October 2000) is a Spanish Internet celebrity.

== Biography and career ==
Marta Díaz was born in Sevilla on 30 October 2000, but she moved to Madrid. She is the sister of Laura and David Díaz, a YouTuber known as AlphaSniper97, and they appeared on videos alongside TheGrefg.

She took horse riding and assisted to horse tame. In 2018 she finished Spanish Baccalaureate, then she did Selectividad, but she left her studies and focused on the content creation on social media, specially on YouTube and TikTok. In 2019 she wrote Todo lo que nunca te dije, published by Libros Cúpula.

In 2022 she was awarded by Forbes as Best Lifestyle Influencer, and in 2023 she got the Ídolo Lifestyle Award. On October it was released the docuseries La vida de Marta Díaz, by Prime Video and produced by Mediaset España and Producciones Mandarina. In January 2024 she attended the fourth season of El desafío, television programm in Antena 3.

Between 2019 and 2023 she was in a relationship with Sergio Reguilón, a Spanish footballer who played for Sevilla FC, Tottenham Hotspur Football Club and Atlético de Madrid. In 2025 it was confirmed she is dating streamer Marlon Lundgren Garcia.

She foght on La Velada del Año VI against influencer Tatiana Ker at Estadio de La Cartuja on 25 July 2026 and won the fight.
