= Ander Cortés =

Basque sportscaster

- Born: July 25, 1995 (age 31); Bilbao, Basque Country, Spain
- Education: University of the Basque Country
- Occupations: Journalist, Twitch streamer and esports caster

Ander Cortés Antonio, known by his pseudonym andeR (born 25 July 1995), is a Basque journalist, Twitch streamer and esports caster.

== Career ==
He began his career as an esports caster. In 2014 he joined Liga de Videojuegos Profesional (LVP) alongside his childhood friend Ibai Llanos during three and a half years. Three years later, he left his job at the league and in February 2020 he became an exclusive content creator for the G2 Esports team.
