= Ibai Llanos =

Spanish Twitch streamer (born 1995)

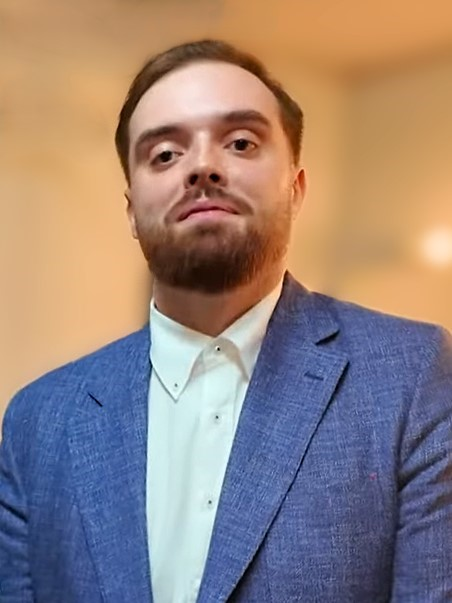
- Ibai in 2025
- Born: Ibai Llanos Garatea; 26 March 1995 (age 31); Bilbao, Basque Country, Spain
- Occupations: Twitch streamer; businessman; esports caster

Twitch information
- Channel: ibai
- Years active: 2014–present
- Followers: 20.4 million

YouTube information
- Channel: Ibai
- Genres: Humor; variety entertainment; gaming; role-playing
- Subscribers: 17.4 million
- Views: 6.4 billion
- Last updated: September 29, 2026

Ibai Llanos Garatea (Spanish: [iˈβaj ˈʎanos ɡaɾaˈtea], born 26 March 1995), better known mononymously as Ibai, is a Spanish internet celebrity, streamer, and esports commentator. He was a content creator for G2 Esports from 2020 to 2021. He is the co-founder of the esports organisation KOI. He is also the founder and president of Porcinos FC and Rönin FC, teams that compete in the Kings League Spain and Tercera Catalana, respectively.

On the live streaming platform Twitch, Ibai operates the second most-followed channel according to analytics company Social Blade. On the same platform in 2021, he created La Velada del Año, which since its second edition has been the most watched live broadcast every year consecutively. On YouTube, he has more than 17 million subscribers on his main channel and a total of over five billion views. In 2021, Forbes Spain named him the most influential social media influencer in Spain.

== Biography ==
Ibai was born in the Deusto district of Bilbao, in the autonomous community of the Basque Country, in Spain on 26 March 1995. Due to the 2008 financial crisis and economic instability at home, he sought distraction in video games.

In 2014, at the age of nineteen, he started commentating League of Legends esports matches. In August 2015, he became a commentator for the Spanish regional league LVP.

In 2016, he moved from Bilbao to Barcelona to be able to work as an announcer.

After broadcasting for the LVP, specifically for the Orange Super League, in February 2019 he started to present a late night show for the Ubeat network called "Hoy no se sale", currently presented by Bruno Feliu and Cristinini.

In February 2020, Llanos quit commentating League of Legends, and left LVP to become an exclusive content creator for the G2 Esports team, along with Ander Cortés, Reven and Ernesto "BarbeQ" Folch.

In January 2021, Ibai made a significant career move, announcing his departure from G2 Esports to launch his own streaming brand. This new venture, which he formed with his previous collaborators and the addition of new talents, marked a new chapter in his career.

Llanos co-founded the esports team KOI alongside Gerard Piqué in December 2021, which is headquartered in Barcelona. It initially competed in League of Legends, Valorant and Teamfight Tactics.

In February 2021, Llanos launched an interview series called "Charlando tranquilamente" ("Calmly Chatting"). In his first program, he spoke with footballer Gerard Piqué. Following episodes featured footballers such as Andrés Iniesta, Ronaldinho, Paulo Dybala, Sergio Agüero and Sergio Ramos, and musical artists like Ed Sheeran, Bad Bunny, Nicky Jam, J Balvin, Rauw Alejandro, Jhayco, Duki, Aitana and Nicki Nicole.

After finding amusement at a video clip showing two young people competing against each other in holding up a balloon from touching the ground, Llanos conceived the Balloon World Cup alongside Piqué, which took place on 14 October 2023.

On 25 June 2022, Llanos set a new record for the most-watched Twitch stream ever with more than 3.3 million viewers tuning into the Velada del Año 2 event, surpassing the record of 2.4 million viewers previously held by TheGrefg during a Fortnite outfit reveal.

In October 2022, Llanos' organization KOI announced a merger with Rogue, which would see all of Rogue's existing teams rebrand to KOI. The partnership was dissolved after just one year in November 2023, after Rogue owner Infinite Reality had reportedly experienced financial issues. Both organizations kept ownership of the same teams they had held before the merger, with KOI retaining its teams in the Valorant Champions Tour, FIFAe Club Series, and LVP SuperLiga.

In January 2024, KOI was acquired by MAD Lions and Toronto Defiant owner OverActive Media in a combined merger that also included fellow Spanish organization Movistar Riders. The LEC team was renamed MAD Lions KOI, with all former KOI and Movistar Riders teams rebranding as Movistar KOI. Due to the merger, Llanos and Piqué will own up to about 21% of OverActive Media. Llanos also agreed on an unspecified "service agreement" with the company.

On 13 July 2024, during La Velada del Año IV, Llanos set a Guinness World Record for the most concurrent viewers for a Twitch stream, with 3,846,256 simultaneous viewers.

On 19 December 2024, he recreated The Squid Game in Madrid, in collaboration with KFC and Netflix, after the release of the second season of the series.

On 26 July 2025, he surpassed the Twitch viewership record for the 4th time with La Velada del Año V, bringing 9,189,762 viewers on his stream. This event made him gain over 1.7 million followers, making him the most followed streamer on Twitch at the time, surpassing Ninja, who spent several years at the number one spot; during this stream he also gained over 164,000 subscribers, which is the 8th most amount ever reached on Twitch. He ended up being quickly dethroned by KaiCenat 2 months later, during his 3rd subathon.

== Personal life ==
Llanos currently resides in Barcelona. He lives in a streaming house together with eight friends and various streamers. He is 70% blindness on his left eye due to a herpes.

Llanos is friends with Argentine football player Sergio Agüero. Agüero invited him to Lionel Messi's much-publicised farewell dinner on 7 August 2021, and has since interviewed Messi at the player's presentation at Paris Saint-Germain and the 2023 Ballon d'Or ceremony.

== Filmography ==
=== Television ===
| Year | Program | Channel | Role |
|---|---|---|---|
| 2019–2020 | Hoy no se sale | Ubeat | Co-Host |
| 2021 | Lo de Évole | LaSexta | Guest |

=== Esports ===
| Year | Videogame | Event | Role |
|---|---|---|---|
| 2014–2016 | League of Legends | LVP División de Honor | Announcer |
| 2015–2020 | League of Legends | EU LCS | Announcer |
| 2015–2020 | League of Legends | Worlds | Announcer |
| 2016–2017 | League of Legends | LVP Clasificatorio Challenger Series | Announcer |
| 2016 | League of Legends | All-Star Barcelona | Announcer and presenter |
| 2017–2020 | League of Legends | Superliga Orange | Announcer |
| 2018 | Fortnite | YouTube Battle Royale | Announcer |
| 2018–2019 | League of Legends | Ibainéfico | Organizer and Announcer |
| 2019 | FIFA 20 | VOLTA Football | Voice actor |
| 2020 | FIFA 20 | La Liga Santander Challenge | Organizer and Announcer |
| 2020 | FIFA 21 | VOLTA Football | Voice actor |

=== Traditional sports ===
| Date | Event | Channel/Program-Context |
|---|---|---|
| 18 March 2018 | Liga Santander: Barça vs Athletic de Bilbao | Onda Vasca |
| 8 April 2018 | Liga Santander: Real Madrid vs Atlético de Madrid | El Chiringuito |
| 25 November 2018 | ACB: Barça Lassa vs Real Madrid | Liga Endesa |
| 6 July 2019 | El partidazo de Youtubers: DjMariio vs TheGrefg | YouTube |
| 3 October 2019 | Adidas: La batalla definitiva | YouTube |
| 26 May 2021 | La Velada del Año | Twitch |
| 29 August 2021 | Ligue 1: Reims vs PSG | Twitch |
| 19 September 2021 | Ligue 1: Olympique de Lyon vs PSG | Twitch |
| 24 October 2021 | Liga Santander: Fútbol Club Barcelona vs Real Madrid | Movistar LaLiga |
| 25 June 2022 | La Velada del Año II | Twitch |
| 2023– | Kings League | Twitch |
| 1 July 2023 | La Velada del Año III | Twitch |
| 13 July 2024 | La Velada del Año IV | Twitch |
| 26 July 2025 | La Velada del Año V | Twitch |
| 18 April 2026 | Copa del Rey Final: Atlético de Madrid vs Real Sociedad | YouTube |
| 25 July 2026 | La Velada del Año VI | Twitch, TikTok and YouTube |

=== Documentaries ===
| Date | Name | Channel/Program |
|---|---|---|
| 13 December 2018 | El lado más profundo de Ibai y Ander | Movistar+ |
| 27 February 2020 | Mi historia | YouTube / Domino's Originals |

=== Films ===
| Date | Name | Director |
|---|---|---|
| 24 November 2020 | Unboxing Ibai | Jaume Balagueró |

=== Other ===
| Date | Event | Channel/Program-Context |
|---|---|---|
| 14 October 2021 | 2021 Balloon World Cup | Twitch – Organized and hosted alongside Piqué inspired by the keep-up with a balloon game. |
| 27 October 2022 | 2022 Balloon World Cup | Twitch – Organized and hosted alongside Piqué inspired by the keep-up with a balloon game. |
| 11 December 2022 | El Último en Pie | Twitch |
| 2 November 2023 | Objeto Invencible | Twitch |
| 18 December 2023 | El Último en Pie 2 | Twitch |
| 14 May 2024 | Mundial de Canicas | Twitch |

== Awards and nominations ==
| Year | Award | Category | Result | Ref. |
|---|---|---|---|---|
| 2015 | Trasgo de Oro | Best caster | Won | |
| 2016 | Trasgo de Oro | Best caster | Won | |
| 2017 | Trasgo de Oro | Best caster | Won | |
| 2018 | Trasgo de Oro | Best caster | Won | |
| 2020 | Eliot Awards | Esports | Nominated | |
| 2020 | Esports Awards | Streamer of the Year | Won | |
| 2021 | Esports Awards | Streamer of the Year | Won | |
| 2021 | The Game Awards | Content Creator of the Year | Nominated | |
| 2021 | ESLAND Awards | Clip of the Year | Nominated | |
| 2021 | ESLAND Awards | Fail of the Year | Won | |
| 2021 | ESLAND Awards | Dance of the Year | Nominated | |
| 2021 | ESLAND Awards | Song of the Year | Won | |
| 2021 | ESLAND Awards | Event of the Year | Won | |
| 2021 | ESLAND Awards | Best Content Series | Nominated | |
| 2021 | ESLAND Awards | Streamer of the Year | Won | |
| 2021 | The Streamer Awards | League of Their Own | Nominated | |
| 2022 | Esports Awards | Streamer of the Year | Won | |
| 2022 | Premios Idolo | Best Esports | Nominated | |
| 2022 | Premios Idolo | Best Streamer | Won | |
| 2022 | Premios Idolo | Digital Creator of the Year | Nominated | |
| 2023 | ESLAND Awards | Streamer of the Year | Won | |
| 2023 | ESLAND Awards | Event of the Year | Won | |
| 2023 | ESLAND Awards | Fail of the Year | Nominated | |
| 2023 | ESLAND Awards | Anger of the Year | Nominated | |
| 2023 | ESLAND Awards | Talk Show of the Year | Nominated | |
| 2023 | Premios Crack | International Personality | Won | |
| 2023 | Nickelodeon Mexico Kids' Choice Awards | Streamer Favorite | Nominated | |
| 2023 | 2023 MTV MIAW Awards | MIAW Icon | Nominated | |
| 2023 | 2023 MTV MIAW Awards | Global Creator | Nominated | |
| 2023 | 13th Streamy Awards | Streamer of the Year - International | Won | |
| 2023 | Premios Ondas | Best Entertainment Program | Won | |
| 2023 | Esports Awards | Streamer of the Year | Nominated | |
| 2023 | Corona de Oro Awards | Best Beef | Nominated | |
| 2023 | Corona de Oro Awards | Anger of the Year | Nominated | |
| 2024 | ESLAND Awards | Streamer of the Year | Nominated | |
| 2024 | ESLAND Awards | Event of the Year | Won | |
| 2024 | ESLAND Awards | Anger of the Year | Nominated | |
| 2024 | The Streamer Awards | Best International Streamer | Nominated | |
| 2025 | Gen Z Awards | Streamer of the Year | Nominated | |

== See also ==
- List of most-followed Twitch channels
