= Jully Poca =

Brazilian professional boxer and social media influencer

- Jully Poca in 2023

Personal information
- Nickname: Poca
- Nationality: Brazilian
- Born: Jully de Oliveira; 11 September 1994 (age 32) Santo André, São Paulo, Brazil
- Height: 1.70 m (5 ft 7 in)
- Weight: Super lightweight

Boxing career
- Stance: Southpaw

Boxing record
- Total fights: 2
- Wins: 1
- Losses: 1

Jully de Oliveira (born september 11 1994 in Santo André), better known as Jully Poca, is a Brazilian professional boxer and social media influencer.

== Early life ==
Poca was born in Santo André, São Paulo. She began training in sanda at 17, well before she started boxing.

== Career ==
=== Influencer boxing ===
Before turning professional, Poca worked as a model and content creator and fought on the celebrity boxing circuit. She debuted in April 2023 against the model Daniella Hemsley at a KingPyn event.

On 15 July 2023, in the KingPyn semifinals, she defeated the previously unbeaten British fighter Elle Brooke. She also defeated Alaena Vampira.

With Misfits Boxing, she became the women's cruiserweight champion and defended the belt against Crystal Pittman at Misfits 18. MMA fighter Cris Cyborg publicly challenged her to a title fight after winning the PFL Super Fights belt. A title defense against Monica Medina was scheduled for 9 November 2025.

=== Professional boxing ===
Most Valuable Promotions (MVP) announced Poca's signing alongside five other female fighters. In May 2026, the promotion included her professional debut on a card focused on Brazilian boxing. Before her second fight, she held a record of 1–0.

On 21 August 2026, in Temecula, California, she faced the American boxer Cinderella Linnear in a four-round super lightweight bout on the undercard of Amanda Serrano versus Lucrecia Manzur. Linnear won by split decision, with scores of 39–37 (twice) and 37–39. It was Poca's first professional defeat.

In preparation, she trained with Ross Enamait and with the Irish boxer Katie Taylor. She also took part in Taylor's training camp for the Irish fighter's farewell fight in Dublin.
