= Rafa Guerrero =

Rafael Guerrero Alonso (born 20 April 1963) is a Spanish former football assistant referee.

Since the 2008/09 season, he has been a refereeing analyst for the newspaper Marca, covering the most controversial plays of the most important match of the day, and he also collaborates on El Chiringuito de Jugones.

== Career ==
Guerrero served as an assistant referee in the Spanish La Liga.
