= La Velada del Año =

Annual celebrity boxing event based in Spain

Information
- First date: 26 May 2021
- Last date: 25 July 2026
- Website: www.infolavelada.com

Events
- Total events: 6

Fights
- Total fights: 37

La Velada del Año ("The [Fight] Night of the Year") events are a recurring crossover boxing event featuring internet streamers and celebrities created by Spanish streamer Ibai Llanos and broadcast live from 2021 to 2026 on his Twitch channel, with a move to Netflix planned starting 2027.

Since its second edition, La Velada del Año has broken the record for the most-viewed livestream in the history of Twitch with each new event. The second edition (2022) reached more than 3.3 million concurrent viewers, setting a new platform record. This record was subsequently surpassed by the third edition in 2023 (3.4 million), the fourth edition in 2024 (3.8 million), and again by the fifth edition in 2025 (9.3 million), consolidating the event as the most-viewed livestream in Twitch history for an individual channel.

On 19 October 2026, it was confirmed that the upcoming seventh, eighth and ninth editions of La Velada would be broadcast on Netflix.

== La Velada del Año (2021) ==
The inaugural Velada was held on 26 May 2021 at the Sala Apolo in Barcelona. Due to restrictions derived from the COVID-19 pandemic, the event was held behind closed doors, with only a few celebrities being invited to attend. It was a modest affair compared to the next installments, with only three fights and fewer musical performances.

No.	Results
1	Torete def. Future by technical knockout
2	Mr. Jägger def. Viruzz by split decision
3	Reven def. ElMillor by unanimous decision

== La Velada del Año II (2022) ==
La Velada del Año 2 was held on 25 June 2022 at the Pavelló Olímpic in Badalona.

No.	Results
1	Spursito def. Carola by unanimous decision
2	Ari Gameplays def. Paracetamor by split decision
3	Viruzz def. Momo by technical knockout
4	Lolito Fdez def. Luzu by corner retirement
5	Mister Jägger def. David Bustamante by corner retirement

== La Velada del Año III (2023) ==
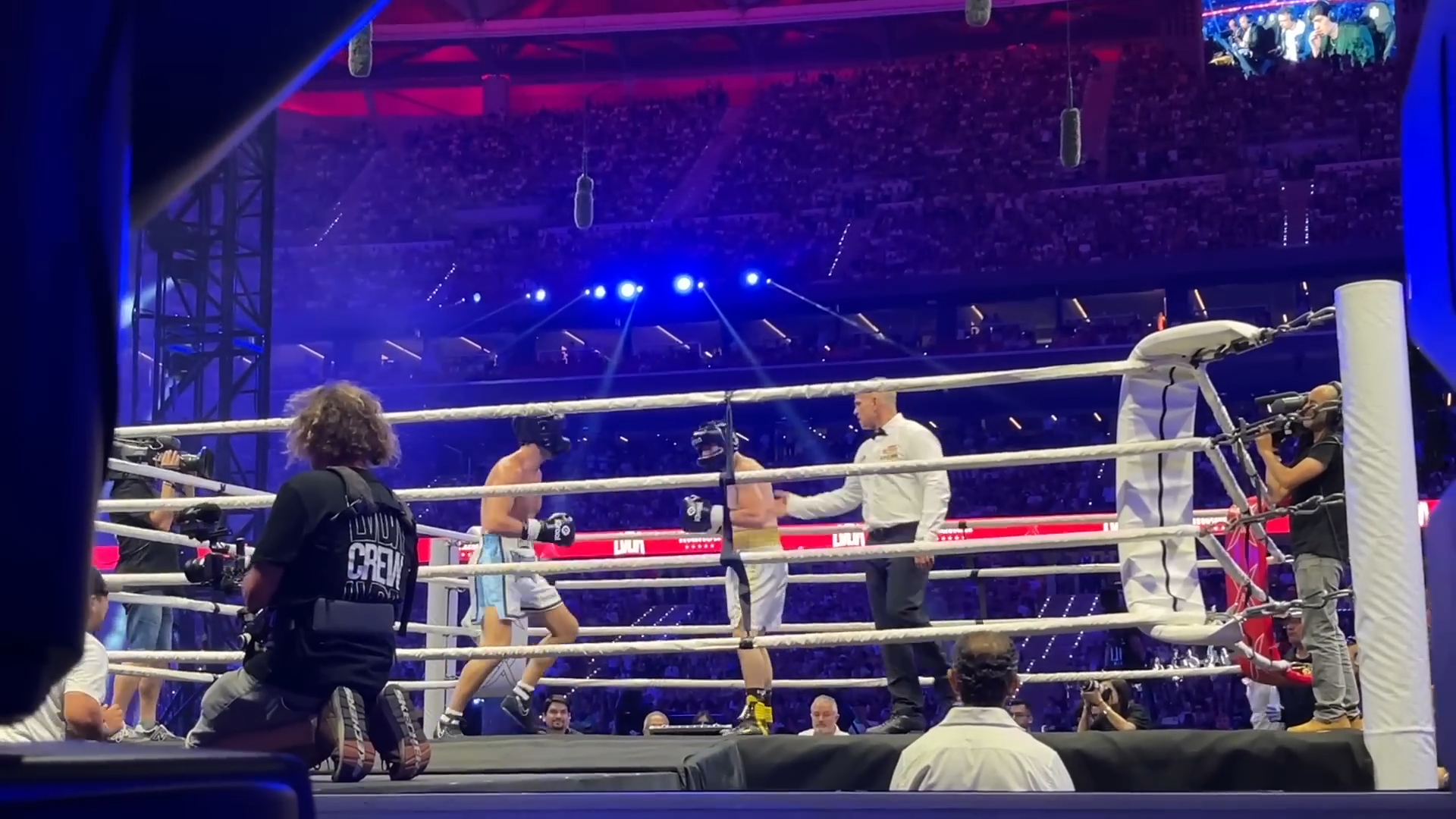
Coscu (white and blue trunks) vs. Germán Garmendia (white and gold trunks) at La Velada del Año III

The third edition of La Velada was held on 1 July 2023 at the Metropolitano Stadium in Madrid. The event was estimated to have sold around 70,000 tickets, the highest attendance for a boxing event in Spain since 1930.

The event's card suffered many changes as a result of injuries or medical issues suffered by the competitors. Mexican streamer Samy Rivers ended up competing in two fights during the show: her own scheduled match against Spaniard Marina Rivers, and later a bout against fellow Queens League chairwoman Mayichi as a last-minute replacement for Mayichi's original opponent, American webcam model Amouranth.

No.	Results
1	Abraham Mateo def. Ampeter by split decision
2	Marina Rivers def. Samy Rivers by split decision
3	Fernanfloo def. Luzu by split decision
4	Shelao def. Misho by referee stoppage
5	Samy Rivers def. Mayichi by unanimous decision
6	Coscu def. Germán Garmendia by technical knockout

== La Velada del Año IV (2024) ==
The fourth edition of La Velada was held on 13 July 2024 at the Santiago Bernabéu Stadium in Madrid, and was co-hosted by streamer Marina Rivers and TV presenter María Patiño. This installment introduced more variety in the match types, veering closer to professional wrestling.

No.	Results	Stipulation
1	Agustin51 def. Carreraaa by unanimous decision	Standard boxing match
2	La Cobra def. Guanyar by referee stoppage	Standard boxing match
3	Alana & Amablitz def. Zeling & Nissaxter by unanimous decision	2-on-2 match
4	Viruzz def. Shelao by unanimous decision	Standard boxing match
5	Karchez won by points decision	"Rey de la Pista" 9-way match
6	Plex def. El Mariana by unanimous decision	Standard boxing match

=== Rey de la Pista Match ===
The format for this 10-way bout was outlined during the event launch livestream:

- Fighters squared off one-on-one in the ring following an entry order which will be drawn during the weigh-in.
- The match would consist of twenty 60-second rounds. After the end of each round, the judges would determine a round winner, who will remain in the ring to face the next entrant in the next round.
- If a fighter were knocked out during a round, he would not fight again for the rest of the match, while his opponent would to rest for the remaining time of the round before the next entrant came in.
- The more rounds a fighter won, the more likely he would be to win the overall match and be awarded the winner's belt. The fighters who were ranked second and third overall in the match would also be awarded silver and bronze medals.

Round results

Rd.	Result
1	Karchez def. Peldanyos
2	Karchez def. Aldo Geo
3	Skain def. Karchez
4	Unicornio def. Skain
5	Unicornio def. Sezar Blue
6	Roberto Cein def. Unicornio
7	Pelicanger def. Roberto Cein
8	Folagor def. Pelicanger
9	Folagor def. Peldanyos
10	Aldo Geo def. Folagor
11	Karchez def. Aldo Geo
12	Karchez def. Unicornio
13	Roberto Cein def. Karchez
14	Sezar Blue def. Roberto Cein
15	Pelicanger def. Sezar Blue
16	Pelicanger def. Folagor
17	Peldanyos def. Pelicanger

Final top 3

Place	Fighter	Points
1	Karchez	60
2	Pelicanger	49
3	Roberto Cein	40

The points and placements obtained by the rest of fighters were not disclosed.

== La Velada del Año V (2025) ==
In a press conference by Ibai on 10 March 2025, La Velada del Año V was confirmed to be scheduled to take place on 26 July at the Estadio La Cartuja in Seville. It was also confirmed that, after experimenting with different stipulations the previous year, La Velada would be reverting to the old format featuring exclusively one-on-one fights.

No.	Results
1	Pereira7 def. Rivaldios by unanimous decision
2	Alana def. Ari Geli by split decision
3	Perxitaa def. Gaspi by technical knockout
4	Abby def. Roro Bueno by split decision
5	Viruzz def. Tomás Mazza by unanimous decision
6	AndoniFitness def. Carlos Belcast by split decision
7	TheGrefg def. Westcol by technical knockout

== La Velada del Año VI (2026) ==
Ibai held a press conference on 9 March 2026, announcing that the sixth Velada was scheduled to take place on 25 July, once again at La Cartuja in Seville. The event's card was also announced during the event.

No.	Fight	Ref.
1	La Parce def. Fabiana Sevillano by split decision	
2	NataliaMX def. Clersss by unanimous decision	
3	Edu Aguirre def. Gastón Edul by split decision	
4	Marta Díaz def. Tatiana Kaer by split decision	
5	Gero Arias def. ByViruzz by unanimous decision	
6	Angie Velasco def. Alondrissa by unanimous decision	
7	Lit Killah def. Kidd Keo by unanimous decision	
8	Roro Bueno def. Samy Rivers by unanimous decision	
9	YoSoyPlex def. Fernanfloo by unanimous decision	
10	TheGrefg def. IlloJuan by split decision	

== Reception ==
La Velada del Año was met with divided opinions among the professional fighting community. Spanish kickboxer Lara Fernández lamented the lack of support for professional fighters, hoping people would "help real athletes instead of people clowning around". Featherweight boxer Jon Fernández argued that the event was good publicity for boxing, saying that it was "sad" that other fighters did not see the opportunity that La Velada offered. Sandor Martín, another professional boxer who helped organize the third edition of La Velada in 2023, stated that he "didn't imagine 60,000 people seeing boxing", but "we can't expect La Velada del Año to solve Spanish boxing's endemic problems".

An article on Espinof about the box office success of Creed III also mentioned La Velada del Año, arguing that the popularity of both the film and the event did not really suggest that boxing was popular again; rather, it seemed to garner more interest as a setting than as the focus of the story. About La Velada, author Randy Meeks wrote: "La Velada's audience isn't going to switch over to 'regular' boxing because they're not interested in it: what they want is to see a macro-crossover of their idols punching one another and doing something out of the ordinary. A sort of Super Smash Bros. of streamers where what matters the least is the sport itself. [...] There is no interest in following or knowing more about other people unless the streamers turn pro. La Velada del Año isn't a hit because of the boxing, but because of the event in itself."

== See also ==
- Supernova Strikers
